= List of American Dialect Society's Words of the Year =

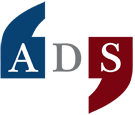
ADS logo

The American Dialect Society's Word of the Year (WotY (Note: WotY is pronounced as "WHOA-tea")) are voted at the January American Dialect Society conference. The first year for which the word of the year was voted ("bushlips") by the ADS was 1990.

Sam Corbin, a words and language writer for The New York Times, comparing the ADS WOTY with the likes from prominent dictionaries, wrote that "the American Dialect Society celebrates linguistic variation to an almost absurd degree".

Starting with about 30 society members in early years, as of 2023 the vote drew some 300 participants. Recently the event consists of two parts: the live nominating session, which culls the nominations open to public a month in advance, and the live vote.

== 2025 ==
- Word of the Year: slop: low-quality, high-quantity content, most typically produced by generative AI
- Most useful: that's AI
- Most likely to succeed: chopped: ugly, undesirable
- Political word of the year: icy conditions: a coded alert to activity by United States Immigration and Customs Enforcement
- Digital word of the year: slop
- Informal word of the year: 6-7
- Most creative word of the year: reheat nachos: redo in an inferior way

== 2024 ==
- Word of the Year: rawdog: to undertake without usual protection, preparation, or comfort (extension of earlier meaning 'to have sex without a condom')
- Most useful: lock in: to enter a state of deep focus and concentration
- Most likely to succeed: unserious
- Political Word of the Year: Luigi
- Digital Word of the Year: brainrot
- Informal Word of the Year: rawdog
- Most Creative Word of the Year: "the X I Xed": phrasal template with an invented irregular verb, used as a playful intensifier (as in "the gasp I gusped/guspt," "the scream I scrempt")
- Most Fun While It Lasted Word of the Year: brat

== 2023 ==
- Word of the Year: enshittification
- Most useful/Most likely to succeed: (derogatory): parenthetical comment humorously appended after a word that might not be expected to be derogatory
- Political Word of the Year: 🍉 (watermelon emoji): symbol of Palestinian solidarity used on social media
- Digital Word of the Year: enshittification
- Informal Word of the Year: "let (someone) cook": allow (someone) to do something that they are good at without interference
- Acronym/Initialism of the Year: FAFO (fuck around and find out): warning that foolish actions will result in unwanted consequences
- AI-related Word of the Year: stochastic parrot
- Most Creative Word of the Year: Kenaissance: renaissance in the wake of the Barbie movie's depiction of Ken
- Euphemism of the Year: "structurally restrictive housing": solitary confinement (rebranded by the New York City Department of Correction)

== 2022 ==
- Word of the Year: "-ussy": suffix from "pussy", attached to various words, as in "bussy" = "boy pussy"
- Most useful/Most likely to succeed: "quiet quitting", minimal performance at a job
- Political Word of the Year: "Dark Brandon", a hint to "Let's Go Brandon, a hint to Joe Biden
- Digital Word of the Year: "-dle", for Wordle-like games
- Informal Word of the Year: " it's giving (X)",
- Most Creative Word of the Year: "-ussy", see above
- Euphemism of the Year: "special military operation", same choice and as for the Russian Word of the Year 2022: a euphemism for the Russian invasion of Ukraine
- Snowclone/phrasal template of the Year: "not X", to ironically express mock horror, incredulity, etc.
- Emoji of the Year: 💀 [skull], to express death (not) from something: laughter, frustration, etc.

== 2021 ==
- Word of the Year: Insurrection
- Most Likely to Succeed: antiwork
- Most Useful: hard pants
- Political Word of the Year: Insurrection
- Digital Word of the Year: #FreeBritney
- Pandemic-related Word of the Year (special category): boosted
- Financial/Economic Word of the Year (special category): Supply chain
- Informal Word of the Year: yassify
- Most Creative Word of the Year: Fauci ouchie
- Euphemism of the Year: unalive

== 2020 ==
- Word of the Year: Covid
- Most Likely to Succeed: antiracism
- Most Useful: Before Times
- Political Word of the Year: abolish/defund
- Digital Word of the Year: doomscrolling
- Zoom-related Word of the Year (special category): you're muted
- Pandemic-related Word of the Year (special category): social distancing
- Slang/Informal Word of the Year: the rona
- Most Creative Combining Form: quaran- (as in quarantini, quaranteam, quaranbeard, quarantigue)
- Euphemism of the Year: essential (workers, labor, businesses)
- Emoji of the Year: (face with medical mask)

== 2018 ==
- Word of the Year: tender-age shelter/camp/facility
- Political Word of the Year: (the) wall
- Digital Word of the Year: techlash
- Slang/Informal Word of the Year: yeet
- Most Useful: Voldemorting
- Most Likely to Succeed: single-use
- Most Creative: white-caller crime
- Euphemism of the Year: racially charged
- WTF Word of the Year: deleted family unit
- Hashtag of the Year: #nottheonion
- Emoji of the Year: (thinking face emoji)

== 2017 ==
- Word of the Year: fake news
- Political Word of the Year: antifa
- Digital Word of the Year: shitpost
- Slang/Informal Word of the Year: wypipo
- Most Useful: die by suicide
- Most Likely to Succeed: fake news
- Most Creative: broflake
- Euphemism of the Year: alternative facts
- WTF Word of the Year: covfefe
- Hashtag of the Year: #metoo
- Emoji of the Year: (woman with head scarf or hijab)

== 2016 ==
- Word of the Year: dumpster fire
- Political Word of the Year: post-truth
- Digital Word of the Year: @ (verb) reply on Twitter using the @ symbol
- Slang Word of the Year: woke
- Most Useful/Most Likely to Succeed: gaslight
- Most Creative: laissez-fairydust
- Euphemism of the Year: locker-room banter
- WTF Word of the Year: bigly
- Hashtag of the Year: #NoDAPL
- Emoji of the Year: (fire) ``"lit", exciting``

== 2015 ==
- Word of the Year: they
- Most Useful/Most Likely to Succeed: they
- Most Creative: ammosexual
- Most Unnecessary: manbun
- Most Outrageous: fuckboy, fuckboi
- Most Euphemistic: Netflix and chill
- Most Likely to Succeed: ghost
- Least Likely to Succeed: sitbit
- Most Notable Hashtag: #SayHerName
- Most Notable Emoji (new category): (eggplant emoji) sexual innuendo

== 2014 ==
- Word of the Year: #blacklivesmatter
- Most Useful: even from "I can't even"
- Most Creative: columbusing
- Most Unnecessary: baeless
- Most Outrageous: second-amendment v. to kill (someone) with a gun
- Most Euphemistic: EIT
- Most Likely to Succeed: salty
- Least Likely to Succeed: platisher
- Most Notable Hashtag (new category): #blacklivesmatter

== 2013 ==
- Word of the Year: because introducing a noun, adjective, or other part of speech (e.g., "because reasons," "because awesome")
- Most Useful: because
- Most Creative: catfish
- Most Unnecessary: sharknado
- Most Outrageous: underbutt
- Most Euphemistic: least untruthful
- Most Likely to Succeed: binge-watch
- Least Likely to Succeed: Thanksgivukkah
- Most Productive: -shaming

== 2012 ==
- Word of the Year: #hashtag
- Most Useful: -(po)calypse, -(ma)geddon
- Most Creative: gate lice
- Most Unnecessary: legitimate rape
- Most Outrageous: legitimate rape
- Most Euphemistic: self-deportation
- Most Likely to Succeed: marriage equality
- Least Likely to Succeed: tie between phablet and YOLO
- Election Words: binders (full of women)

== 2011 ==
- Word of the Year: Occupy
- Most Useful: humblebrag
- Most Creative: Mellencamp a woman who has aged out of being a "cougar (after John Cougar Mellencamp)
- Most Unnecessary: bi-winning
- Most Outrageous: assholocracy
- Most Euphemistic: job creator
- Most Likely to Succeed: cloud
- Least Likely to Succeed: brony
- Occupy Words: the 99%, 99 percenters

== 2010 ==
- Word of the Year: app
- Most Useful: nom
- Most Creative: prehab
- Most Unnecessary: refudiate
- Most Outrageous: gate rape
- Most Euphemistic: kinetic event
- Most Likely to Succeed: trend
- Least Likely to Succeed: culturomics
- Fan Words: gleek

== 2009 ==
- Word of the Year: tweet
- Word of the Decade: google
- Most Useful: fail
- Most Creative: Dracula sneeze
- Most Unnecessary: sea kittens
- Most Outrageous: death panel
- Most Euphemistic: hike the Appalachian trail
- Most Likely to Succeed: twenty-ten
- Least Likely to Succeed: Any name of the decade 2000–2009, such as Naughties, Aughties, Oughties, etc.

== 2008 ==
- Word of the Year: bailout
- Most Useful: Barack Obama Both names as combining forms
- Most Creative: recombobulation area
- Most Unnecessary: moofing
- Most Outrageous: terrorist fist jab
- Most Euphemistic: scooping technician
- Most Likely to Succeed: shovel-ready
- Least Likely to Succeed: PUMA
- Election-related Words: maverick

== 2007 ==
- Word of the Year: subprime
- Most Useful: green-
- Most Creative: Googlegänger
- Most Unnecessary: Happy Kwanhanamas!
- Most Outrageous: toe-tapper
- Most Euphemistic: human terrain team
- Most Likely to Succeed: green-
- Least Likely to Succeed: strand-in
- Real Estate/Mortgage/Loan Words: subprime

== 2006 ==
- Word of the Year: to pluto/be plutoed
- Most Useful: climate canary
- Most Creative: lactard
- Most Unnecessary: SuriKat
- Most Outrageous: Cambodian accessory
- Most Euphemistic: waterboarding
- Most Likely to Succeed: YouTube as a verb, to use the YouTube web site or to have a video of one's self be posted on the site
- Least Likely to Succeed: grup
- Pluto-Related Words: to be plutoed, to pluto

== 2005 ==
- Word of the Year: truthiness
- Most Useful: podcast
- Most Creative: whale-tail
- Most Unnecessary: K Fed
- Most Outrageous: crotchfruit, a child or children
- Most Euphemistic: internal nutrition, force-feeding a prisoner
- Most Likely to Succeed: sudoku
- Least Likely to Succeed: pope-squatting, registering a likely domain name of a new pope in advance
- Special nonce category, Best Tom Cruise-Related Word: "jump the couch"

== 1990 ==
- Word of the Year: bushlips: insincere political rhetoric; the term was inspired by the former president, George H. W. Bush, who once said, "Read my lips, no new taxes,” and then broke his promise.
