= Word of the year =

Most important word or expression in a year

The word(s) of the year, sometimes capitalized as "Word(s) of the Year" and abbreviated "WOTY" (or "WotY"), refers to any of various assessments as to the most important word(s) or expression(s) in the public sphere during a specific year.

The German tradition Wort des Jahres was started in 1971. In 1999 it was supplemented with the Austrian word of the year to express the pluricentric nature of German and its multiple standards varieties.

The American Dialect Society's Word of the Year is the oldest English-language version, and the only one that is announced after the end of the calendar year, determined by a vote of independent linguists, and not tied to commercial interest. However, various other organizations also announce Words of the Year for a variety of purposes.

== American Dialect Society ==
Since 1990, the American Dialect Society (ADS) has designated one or more words or terms to be the "Word of the Year" in the United States. In addition to the "Word of the Year", the society also selects words in other categories such as "Most Outrageous," "Most Creative," and "Most Likely to Succeed."

Year	Word of the Year	Notes
1990	bushlips	
1991	mother of all –	
1992	Not!	
1993	information superhighway	
1994	Tie: cyber and morph	
1995	Tie: World Wide Web and newt	
1996	mom	Emergence of voting blocs like "soccer moms".
1997	millennium bug	
1998	e-	
1999	Y2K	
2000	chad	Cause of a recount in the 2000 US election
2001	9-11, 9/11 or September 11	
2002	weapons of mass destruction or WMD	
2003	metrosexual	
2004	red/blue/purple states	Became a term used to describe the political position of a state. Popularized during the 2004 Democratic Keynote address given by Barack Obama
2005	truthiness	
2006	to be plutoed, to pluto	
2007	subprime	Subprime mortgage crisis that started in 2007
2008	bailout	Bank bailout of 2008
2009	tweet	
2010	app	
2011	occupy	
2012	#hashtag	
2013	because	
2014	#blacklivesmatter	
2015	they	
2016	dumpster fire	
2017	fake news	
2018	tender-age shelter	
2019	(my) pronouns	
2020	Covid	
2021	Insurrection	
2022	-ussy	
2023	enshittification	
2024	rawdog	
2025	slop	

== Australian National Dictionary Centre ==
The Australian National Dictionary Centre has announced a Word of the Year each since 2006. The word is chosen by the editorial staff, and is selected on the basis of having come to some prominence in the Australian social and cultural landscape during the year. The Word of the Year is often reported in the media as being Australia's word of the year, but the word is not always an Australian word.

Year	Word of the Year
2006	podcast
2007	me-tooism
2008	GFC
2009	Twitter
2010	vuvuzela
2011	
2012	green-on-blue
2013	bitcoin
2014	shirtfront
2015	sharing economy
2016	democracy sausage
2017	Kwaussie
2018	Canberra bubble
2019	Voice
2020	iso
2021	strollout
2022	teal
2023	Matilda
2024	Colesworth
2025	social media ban

== Cambridge Dictionary ==
The Cambridge Dictionary Word of the Year, by Cambridge University Press & Assessment, has been published every year since 2015. The word is chosen based on "user data, zeitgeist, and language."

In 2024, Cambridge picked "manifest" as its Word of the Year. Traditionally, the word has been used as an adjective meaning "obvious", or as a verb meaning "to show something clearly through signs or actions". The word was chosen owing to its use by celebrities, particularly on social media, as a verb meaning "to imagine achieving something you want, in the belief doing so will make it more likely to happen".

Year	Word of the Year	Note
2015	austerity	
2016	paranoid	Uncertainty surrounding global events.
2017	populism	
2018	nomophobia	
2019	upcycling	
2020	quarantine	Worldwide lockdowns as a result of the COVID-19 pandemic.
2021	perseverance	Deployment of NASA Mars rover Perseverance, as well as societal recovery after COVID-19.
2022	homer	The answer to a difficult Wordle puzzle.
2023	hallucinate	Referring to AI hallucinations: erroneous material generated by AI.
2024	manifest	
2025	parasocial	
2026	human	

== Collins English Dictionary ==
The Collins English Dictionary has announced a Word of the Year every year since 2013, and prior to this, announced a new 'word of the month' each month in 2012. Published in Glasgow, UK, Collins English Dictionary has been publishing English dictionaries since 1819.

Toward the end of each calendar year, Collins release a shortlist of notable words or those that have come to prominence in the previous 12 months. The shortlist typically comprises ten words, though in 2014 only four words were announced as the Word of the Year shortlist.

The Collins Words of the Year are selected by the Collins Dictionary team across Glasgow and London, consisting of lexicographers, editorial, marketing, and publicity staff, though previously the selection process has been open to the public.

Whilst the word is not required to be new to feature, the appearance of words in the list is often supported by usage statistics and cross-reference against Collins' extensive corpus to understand how language may have changed or developed in the previous year. The Collins Word of the Year is also not restricted to UK language usage, and words are often chosen that apply internationally as well, for example, fake news in 2017.

Year	Word of the Year	Shortlist
2013	geek	twerking; Bitcoin; phablet; Plebgate; fracker; cybernat; thigh gap; Olinguito; Black Friday; payday lending; Harlem Shake
2014	photobomb	Tinder; bakeoff; normcore; devo max
2015	binge-watch	dadbod; shaming; Corbynomics; clean eating; ghosting; swipe; contactless; manspreading; transgender
2016	Brexit	hygge; mic drop; Trumpism; throw shade; sharenting; snowflake generation; dude food; uberization; JOMO
2017	fake news	Antifa; corbynmania; cuffing season; echo chamber; fidget spinner; gender-fluid; gig economy; Insta; unicorn
2018	single-use	backstop; floss; gammon; gaslight; MeToo; plogging; VAR; vegan; whitewash
2019	climate strike	bopo; cancel; deepfake; double down; entryist; hopepunk; influencer; nonbinary; rewilding
2020	lockdown	Coronavirus; BLM; key worker; furlough; self-isolate; social distancing; Megxit; TikToker; mukbang
2021	NFT	climate anxiety; double-vaxxed; Metaverse; pingdemic; cheugy; crypto; hybrid working; neopronoun; Regencycore
2022	permacrisis	Carolean; Kyiv; lawfare; Partygate; quiet quitting; splooting; sportswashing; vibe shift; warm bank
2023	AI	Bazball; deinfluencing; nepo baby; ultraprocessed; canon event; debanking; greedflation; semaglutide; ULEZ
2024	Brat	brainrot; era; looksmaxxing; rawdogging; anti-tourism; delulu; romantasy; supermajority; yapping
2025	vibe coding	aura farming; biohacking; broligarchy; clanker; coolcation; glaze; HENRY; micro-retirement; taskmasking
2026	mogging	bixie; carspreading; firewave; fricy; friendslop; ghost job; hydration break; Manchesterism; P(doom)

== Dictionary.com ==
In 2010, Dictionary.com announced its first word of the year, 'change', and has done so in December every year since. The selection is based on search trends on the site throughout the year and the news events that drive them.

The following is the list of annual words since beginning with the first in 2010:

Year	Word of the Year
2010	change
2011	tergiversate
2012	bluster
2013	privacy
2014	exposure
2015	identity
2016	xenophobia
2017	complicit
2018	misinformation
2019	existential
2020	pandemic
2021	allyship
2022	woman
2023	hallucinate
2024	demure
2025	6-7
2026	maxxing

== The Economist ==
Since 2021, British current affair journal The Economist has published a word of the year.

Year	Word of the Year
2021	vax
2022	hybrid work
2023	ChatGPT
2024	kakistocracy
2025	slop

== Macquarie Dictionary ==
The Macquarie Dictionary, which is the dictionary of Australian English, updates the online dictionary each year with new words, phrases, and definitions. These can be viewed on their website.

Each year the editors review all new words and definitions that have been added to the dictionary in the past year from which they select a shortlist and invite the public to vote on their favourite. The public vote is held in November and results in the People's Choice winner. The most influential word of the year is also selected by the Word of the Year Committee which comprises the Editorial Team at Macquarie Dictionary along with David Astle and language research specialist Tiger Webb. The Committee meets annually to select the overall winning words.

The following is the list of winning words since the Macquarie Word of the Year first began in 2006:

Year	Committee's Choice	People's Choice
2006	muffin top	
2007	pod slurping	password fatigue
2008	toxic debt	flashpacker
2009	shovel ready	tweet
2010	googleganger	shockumentary
2011	burqini	fracking
2012	phantom vibration syndrome	First World problem
2013	infovore	onesie
2014	mansplain	shareplate
2015	captain's call	captain's call
2016	fake news	halal snack pack
2017	milkshake duck	framily
2018	me too	single-use
2019	cancel culture	robodebt
2020	doomscrolling and rona	Karen and covidiot
2021	strollout	strollout
2022	teal	bachelor's handbag
2023	cozzie livs	generative AI
2024	enshittification	enshittification
2025	AI slop	AI slop

== Merriam-Webster ==
The lists of Merriam-Webster's Words of the Year (for each year) are ten-word lists published annually by the American dictionary-publishing company Merriam-Webster, Inc., which feature the ten words of the year from the English language. These word lists started in 2003 and have been published at the end of each year. At first, Merriam-Webster determined its contents by analyzing page hits and popular searches on its website. Since 2006, the list has been determined by an online poll and by suggestions from visitors to the website.

The following is the list of words that became Merriam-Webster's Word of the Year since 2003:

Year	Word of the Year
2003	democracy
2004	blog
2005	integrity
2006	truthiness
2007	w00t
2008	bailout
2009	admonish
2010	austerity
2011	pragmatic
2012	socialism and capitalism
2013	science
2014	culture
2015	-ism
2016	surreal
2017	feminism
2018	justice
2019	they
2020	pandemic
2021	vaccine
2022	gaslighting
2023	authentic
2024	polarization
2025	slop

== Oxford ==
Oxford University Press, which publishes the Oxford English Dictionary and many other dictionaries, announces an Oxford Dictionaries UK Word of the Year and an Oxford Dictionaries US Word of the Year; sometimes these are the same word and simply dubbed Word of the Year. The word need not have been coined within the year or twelve months but it does need to have become prominent or notable during that time. There is no guarantee that the Word of the Year will be included in any Oxford dictionary if it's not present. The Oxford Dictionaries Words of the Year are selected by editorial staff from each of the Oxford dictionaries. The selection team is made up of lexicographers and consultants to the dictionary team, and editorial, marketing, and publicity staff.

Year	UK Word of the Year	US Word of the Year	Hindi Word of the Year
2004	chav		
2005	sudoku	podcast	
2006	bovvered	carbon-neutral	
2007	carbon footprint	locavore	
2008	credit crunch	hypermiling	
2009	simples	unfriend	
2010	big society	refudiate	
2011	squeezed middle		
2012	omnishambles	GIF (noun)	
2013	selfie		
2014	vape		
2015	😂 (Face With Tears of Joy emoji)		
2016	post-truth		
2017	youthquake		Aadhaar (Note: First Hindi Word of the Year)
2018	toxic		Nari Shakti (Women Power)
2019	climate emergency		Samvidhaan
2020	No single word chosen		Aatmanirbharta
2021	vax		
2022	goblin mode		
2023	rizz		
2024	brain rot		
2025	rage bait		

== Society for Canadian English ==
Since 2025, the Society for Canadian English has been facilitating a "CWOTY" completion to establish the Canadian Word of the Year. The first winner was to maplewash.

== Grant Barrett ==
Since 2004, lexicographer Grant Barrett has published an unranked words-of-the-year list, usually in The New York Times.

== Similar word lists ==
=== A Word a Year ===
Since 2004, Susie Dent, an English lexicographer has published a column, "A Word a Year", in which she chooses a single word from each of the last 101 years to represent preoccupations of the time. Susie Dent notes that the list is subjective. Each year, she gives a completely different set of words.

Since Susie Dent works for the Oxford University Press, her words of choice are often incorrectly referred to as "Oxford Dictionary's Word of the Year".

=== Other countries ===
Austria: Word of the year (Austria), since 1999. The event is organised by the Society for Austrian German (GSÖD). Notable selections include the 52-letter word Bundespräsidentenstichwahlwiederholungsverschiebung (2016), and more recently, 'Elk Emil', in 2025.

In Germany, a Wort des Jahres has been selected since 1972 (for the year 1971) by the Society of the German Language. In addition, an Unwort des Jahres (Un-word of the year or Most Unpleasant Word of the Year) has been nominated since 1991, for a word or phrase in public speech deemed insulting or socially inappropriate (such as "Überfremdung"). Similar selections are made each year since 1999 in Austria, 2002 in Liechtenstein, and 2003 in Switzerland. Since 2008, language publisher Langenscheidt supports a search for the German youth word of the year, which aims to find new words entering the language through the vernacular of young people.

In addition, several German dialects have their own Wort des Jahres selection: de:Plattdeutsches Wort des Jahres, de:Wort des Jahres (Sachsen), and de:Wort des Jahres (Südtirol).

In Denmark, the Word of the year has been selected by Mål og Mæle, a popular science language magazine, during 2006–2012 and since 2009 also by the Sproglaboratoriet radio program of the DR P1 radio channel in collaboration with Dansk Sprognævn (Danish Language Council).

Japan has held an annual word of the year contest called the "New Word/Trendy Phrase Award" (Shingo ryūkōgo taishō) since 1984, sponsored by the Jiyu Kokuminsha publisher (by U-CAN since 2004). In addition, the Kanji of the Year (kotoshi no kanji) has been selected since 1995, and both the kanji and the word/phrase of the year often reflect current Japanese events and attitudes. For example, in 2011, following the Fukushima nuclear disaster, the frustratingly enigmatic phrase used by Japanese officials before the explosion regarding the possibility of a meltdown - "the possibility of recriticality is not zero" (Sairinkai no kanōsei zero de wa nai) - became the top phrase of the year. In the same year, the kanji for "bond" (i.e., family ties or friendship) became the kanji of the year, expressing the importance of collectiveness in the face of disaster.

Liechtenstein: Word of the year (Liechtenstein) since 2002.

In Norway, the Word of the year poll has been carried out since 2012.

In Portugal, the Word of the year poll has been carried out since 2009.

In Russia, the Word of the year poll has been carried out since 2007.

In Slovenia, the word of the year poll has been carried out since 2016. Each year, it is announced in January together with the SSL (Slovenian Sign Language) gesture of the year.

In Spain, a Word of the year has been selected by Fundéu since 2013.

Switzerland: Word of the year (Switzerland), since 2003.

In Ukraine, the Word of the year poll has been carried out since 2013.

In The Netherlands, a word of the year poll is carried out by dictionary publisher Van Dale since 2007.

== See also ==
- Language Report from Oxford University Press
- Lists of Merriam-Webster's Words of the Year
- Neologism
- Doublespeak Award
- Kanji of the year
