= Cheugy =

Internet neologism

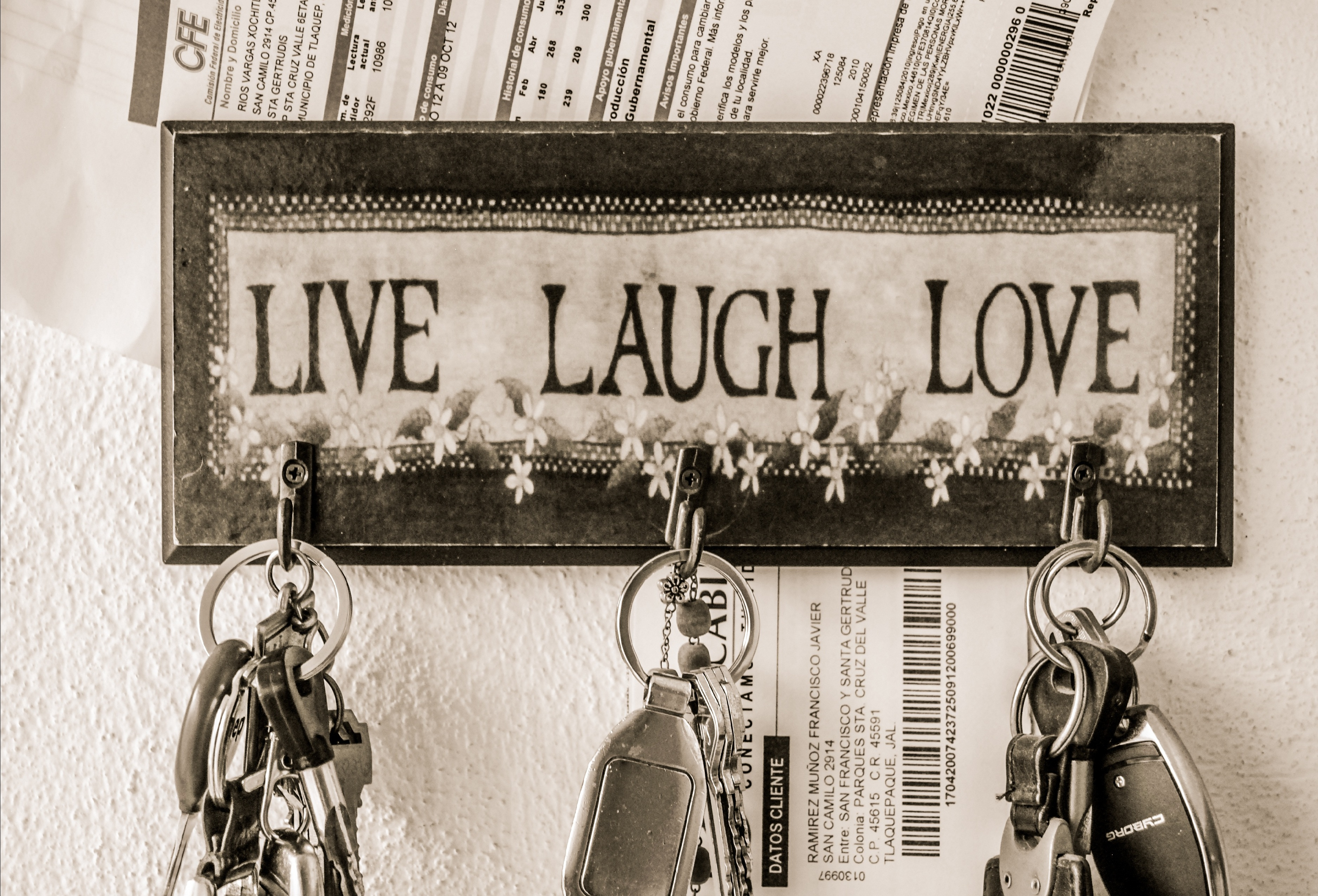
Live, laugh, love signs are sometimes cited as something "cheugy".

Cheugy (/ˈtʃuːɡi/ CHOO-ghee) is an American neologism coined in 2013 as a pejorative description of lifestyle trends associated with the early 2010s. This aesthetic has been described as "the opposite of trendy" or "trying too hard". The term has been used positively by some who identify with the aesthetic.

People who are cheugy are referred to as cheugs. Things described as cheugy include "mom jeans", "live, laugh, love signs", "Minion memes", and "anything that says 'girl boss' on it". While it has been compared to being basic, some sources have suggested that it is "not quite 'basic'". The Evening Standard said that "the cheug's logical archnemesis is probably the hipster".

== Origin ==
According to an April 2021 article in The New York Times written by Taylor Lorenz, the term cheugy was coined in 2013 by Gaby Rasson, a Beverly Hills High School student, who used it to describe "people who were slightly off trend"; an Urban Dictionary definition appeared in 2018. Subsequently, it was mentioned in a TikTok video by Hallie Cain in March 2021, inspiring explainers from various media outlets (including Lorenz's own article). The American Dialect Society voted cheugy its 2021 "informal word of the year".

While the original TikTok video received around 100,000 likes, Vox writer Rebecca Jennings said this number was "Twitter viral, but not TikTok viral". The New Statesman similarly said that "Even on TikTok [...] it hadn't really taken mainstream hold". Broader attention outside TikTok came from Lorenz' article, which she described to Vox as "one of the most-read recent stories in the Styles section". Lorenz said that while the definition of the term was "highly subjective and changing quickly", Instagram was the "pinnacle of cheugy". This post had a much wider reach than the original TikTok post; commentator Sarah Manavis said that "until last week, and certainly before Lorenz's article, few people would have heard of cheugy". Manavis described the coverage of the term as "the latest chapter in the 'war' between Gen-Z and millennials, an intergenerational conflict that can be best defined by trendy articles in digital publications and broadsheet newspapers alike, 'questioning whether such a "war" really existed and saying that 'what the coverage of the Gen-Z/millennial 'battlelines' achieves is to distract us from the very real generational inequality that exists between both of them and baby boomers.'"

== 2020s use ==
According to a May 2021 article on youth news website The Tab, "some people have suggested" that the trend betrayed an underlying misogyny. An article on CNET said that whether the word cheugy was sexist was "a good question", since girl bosses were female; contrariwise, the article noted that cargo shorts and Axe Body Spray were "cheugy stuff you might associate more with men." Other male cheugy traits include tattoos of compasses. Rolling Stone said that "misogyny is insidious and takes many forms in our culture, but making fun of someone for posting Minion memes is not one of them." Refinery29 said that its use was "mostly being fueled by backlash" and that "for every person [...] that proudly calls themself a 'cheug', there is someone who cries misogyny or classism."

The term is claimed by many to reflect intergenerational conflict: Rolling Stone said that "Millennials [...] are forced to confront the vestiges of our own mortality in the form of relentless, merciless roasting from Gen Z", and Vice said that "cheugy, just like the Gen Z-Millennial war, can also be a phase that comes and goes." The Cut said that "so far, much of the Cheugy Discourse is people just trying to suss out what is and isn't cheugy. The rest appears to be millennials having an existential crisis."

Among Generation Z, the reaction to cheugy has been described as one of confusion. Inside Hook said that many zoomers were unfamiliar with the term before its popularization by websites such as Twitter and that many zoomers do not view themselves as participants in the spread of cheugy (rather perceiving its popularity as "millennial on millennial violence").

== See also ==
- Glossary of Generation Z slang
