= Woot (disambiguation) =

Woot is an e-commerce retailer.

Woot may also refer to:

== People ==
- Woot., abbreviation for Elmer Otis Wooton used with botanical nomenclature

== Art, entertainment, and media ==
- w00t, an album by the band Garaj Mahal
- Woot the Wanderer, a character who appears in L. Frank Baum's novel The Tin Woodman of Oz (1918)
- WOOT-LD, a television station licensed to serve Chattanooga, Tennessee

== Other uses ==
- Woot, a deity of the people of the Kuba Kingdom (in the modern-day Democratic Republic of the Congo)

== See also ==
- w00t (W-zero-zero-t), a slang term used to express excitement or happiness
