= Obama is a schmuck =

Russian-language slogan used to mock Barack Obama

Car with sticker "Obama is a schmuck"

"Obama is a Schmuck!" (Russian: Обама — чмо!, romanized: Obama — chmo) is an catchphrase that gained popularity in Russia from 2014; an invective and an act of vernacular symbolic aggression directed at the 44th President of the United States, Barack Obama (in office 2009 to 2017).

== History ==
External videos
- Mikhail Zadornov — Obama Is a Schmuck! on YouTube (2 min 27 sec)

Philologists Alexandra Arkhipova, Daria Radchenko and Alexey Titkov, noted that the expression acquired "extraordinary popularity" thanks to a video in which the satirist Mikhail Zadornov, perceived by Russian audiences as a "specialist in mocking everything American", performed a rap song including the words "Obama is a Schmuck". The authors write, however, that the mass spread of insulting inscriptions and stickers featuring Obama had occurred several months earlier, and cars bearing such slogans were included in Zadornov's video footage. The spoken version of the phrase used in the clip did not subsequently achieve wide circulation, but early comments under the video, which researchers suggest may have coming from paid internet trolls, read: "We should put an 'Obama is a Schmuck' sticker on our cars too" and "We need to hold such an action across Russia so that as many people as possible put them up".

In 2015, the expression "Obama is a Schmuck" in Russia was the winner in the "Anti-word of the Year" category, language of propaganda and hostility, within the framework of the Russian Word of the Year project organized by the portal snob.ru.

=== Car stickers ===
According to the study by Arkhipova, Radchenko and Titkov, in 2014 there were few media references to "Obama is a Schmuck" stickers, together with other slogans of similar meaning, accounting for 7% of all press mentions of car stickers between 1 January 2014 and 1 June 2016. Most appeared in regional media in autumn 2014 and described an unusual practice of "vernacular patriotism." The tone suggested that the practice was relatively new and episodic, and negative reactions had not yet been reflected. In 2015, 80 percent of all mentions, 412 items, appeared in the media, and the tone shifted. The public visibility and ethical ambiguity of the practice made it the subject of intensive discussion online and in the press. Social network platforms actively published photographs of such vehicles with comments expressing both approval and disapproval. In many cases, the "Obama is a Schmuck" sticker ceased to be perceived as a humorous response to sanctions or a manifestation of civic patriotism, and was discussed in sharply negative terms.

In 2020, Deutsche Welle that although Donald Trump replaced Barack Obama as the US President, stickers with the slogan "Obama is a Schmuck" were still offered by many Russian online stores.

In February 2020, a scandal erupted after media reported that the Federal State Unitary Enterprise "Departmental Security" of the Ministry of Energy of Russia had planned to purchase "Obama is a Schmuck" stickers for its North Caucasus branch under a state contract. The ministry later stated that the sticker had appeared on the procurement list due to a technical error or "a text editor mistake such as T9", canceled the tender, and disciplined three employees.

Sergey Strokan of Kommersant, noted that "Obama is a Schmuck" stickers on the rear windows of mid-range foreign cars on Moscow streets became one of the most vivid symbols of the perception of Barack Obama in Russia.

In 2018, the Russian journalist Konstantin Eggert, writing in Deutsche Welle, noticed that for Russians it is an element of the narrative about humiliated Russia now raising from its knees. "Only in Russia the meme 'Obama is a Schmuck' could appear and now be to replaced by 'Trump is a Schmuck'", he wrote, placing this sticker alongside with the stickers "We can repeat" (a hint to the World War II trip to Berlin on tanks).

== Analysis ==
The expression "Obama is a Schmuck" is used in a distinct mode of engagement in which a statement balancing between insult and ridicule is placed at the boundary between private and public space, for example as a sticker on a personal car reading "Obama is a Schmuck". By placing such a provocative inscription on their cars, drivers gain additional public visibility, and the message is read as a demonstration of belonging to a particular group and as a public expression of a personal political stance.

"Obama is a schmuck" in white paint on the runway of the Russian air base in Syrian Latakia (satellite view)

Such an inscription symbolically marks public space as controlled territory in which the opponent has no power and may be symbolically humiliated. Over time, in addition to private space, the invective began to appear on various public objects, including relict cacti in a nature reserve in Yalta or on the runway of the Khmeimim Air Base in Syria. In this way, the figure of the individual speaker gradually dissolved and was replaced by an anonymous public "response" and the symbolic aggression is presented as a public collective response to foreign or hostile powers. This stage of public messaging is significant because it marks the transition from vernacular forms of reaction, whether individual or small-group-based, to organized collective forms.

== See also ==
- Putin khuylo! ("Putin is a dickhead!") – Ukrainian and Russian catchphrase also originating in 2014
