= Kanji of the Year =

Japanese character chosen by annual ballot

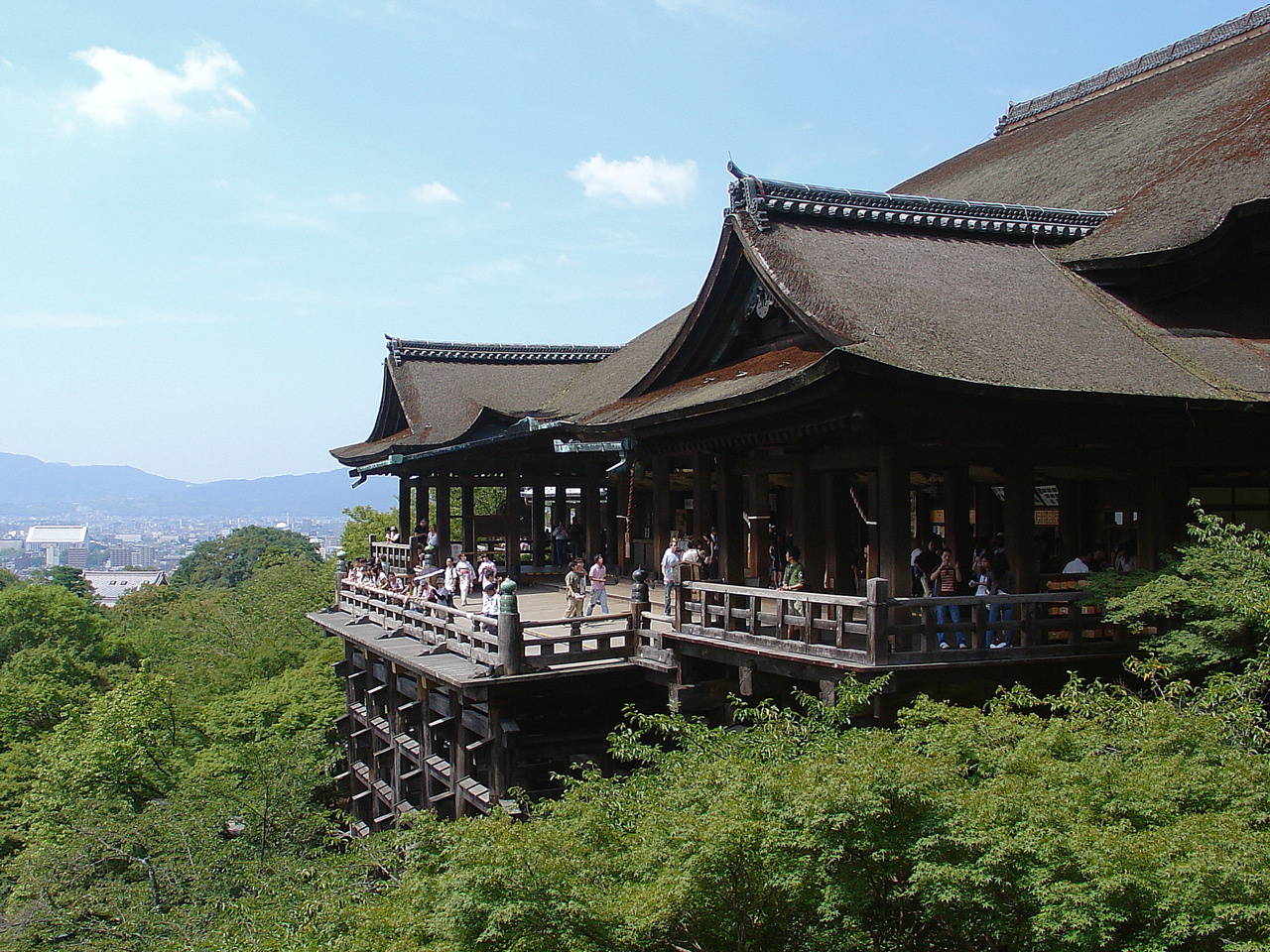
The Kiyomizu Temple, where the kanji of the year is announced.

The kanji of the year (今年の漢字, Kotoshi no kanji) is a character chosen by the Japanese Kanji Proficiency Society (財団法人日本漢字能力検定協会, Zaidan hōjin Nihon Kanji Nōryoku kentei kyōkai) through a national ballot in Japan, starting in 1995. The character with the most votes, selected to represent the events of that year, is announced in a ceremony on December 12 (Kanji Day) at Kiyomizu Temple.

Year	Kanji	Readings	Meanings	Events	Source(s)
1995	震	shin furu-u	quake	The Great Hanshin–Awaji earthquake and growing feelings of unease caused by the sarin gas attack on the Tokyo subway.	
1996	食	shoku ku-u	food eat	Multiple outbreaks of food poisoning due to E. coli O157 occur, affecting school lunch programs.	
1997	倒	tou tao-su	collapse knock down	The 1997 Asian financial crisis results in a wave of corporate bankruptcies and bank failures, while the Japanese team beats regional powerhouses in the Asia qualifying tournament to win a berth in the 1998 FIFA World Cup.	
1998	毒	doku	poison	Sixty-seven people are sickened and four die after eating poisoned curry, for which Masumi Hayashi is arrested. Similar incidents follow amid concerns about dioxins.	
1999	末	matsu sue	end	The final year of the century, when the Tokaimura nuclear accident occurs.	
2000	金	kin kane	gold money	Judo athlete Ryoko Tamura (now Ryoko Tani) and marathon-runner Naoko Takahashi win gold at the Sydney Olympics, Kim Dae Jung and Kim Jong-il hold the first North-South Korean presidential summit, the deaths of centenarian twin sisters Kin-san and Gin-san (whose names sound like "gold" and "silver"), and the introduction of the ¥2000 note.	
2001	戦	sen tataka-u	battle	The September 11, 2001 attacks, the U.S. war in Afghanistan, and the global recession.	
2002	帰	ki kae-ru	return	Japan and North Korea begin talks and five Japanese citizens kidnapped by North Korea return to Japan.	
2003	虎	ko tora	tiger	The Hanshin Tigers win the Central League pennant for the first time in 18 years and the involvement of the Japan Self-Defense Force in the Iraq War, which some equated to "stepping on a tiger's tail" (虎の尾を踏む).	
2004	災	sai wazawa-i	disaster	The Chūetsu earthquake, Typhoon Tokage wreaks great damages upon landfall, the accident at the Mihama Nuclear Power Plant, and scandal at Mitsubishi Motors involving the cover-up of known defects.	
2005	愛	ai ito-shii	love	Expo 2005 is held in Aichi, Princess Nori marries Yoshiki Kuroda, and table tennis athlete Ai Fukuhara plays in China, as well as a spate of child-by-parent and parent-by-child murders.	
2006	命	mei inochi	life	Prince Hisahito of Akishino is born, while feelings of uncertainty about life arise from hit and run accidents due to driving under the influence, suicide due to bullying, and the notable suicide of a member of the Imperial Guard.	
2007	偽	gi nise	deception false	A series of food labeling scandals in which expired products were relabeled and sold, problems over political funds and faulty pension records, and allegations of copyright infringement at the Beijing Shijingshan Amusement Park.	
2008	変	hen kawa-ru	change	Changing of the Japanese prime minister, Barack Obama winning the American presidency using the slogan "change", economical and ecological changes around the world.	
2009	新	shin atara-shii	new	The Democratic Party of Japan is swept into power by lower house elections to end half a century of LDP dominance, the worldwide outbreak of swine flu (known as Shin-gata influenza), and Ichiro Suzuki sets a new MLB record with nine consecutive seasons with 200 hits.	
2010	暑	sho atsu-i	hot	Record heatwaves affecting both people's livelihoods and the natural environment and the Chilean mine collapse trapped 33 men about 700 meters underground in a hot, humid mine.	
2011	絆	han kizuna	bonds	The Tōhoku earthquake and tsunami occurs, with people across Japan rediscovering the importance of their bonds with family and friends and Japan's women's national football team, Nadeshiko Japan, wins the 2011 FIFA Women's World Cup, a result of confidence and teamwork among its members.	
2012	金	kin kane	gold money	Several medals are won at the 2012 London Olympics, Shinya Yamanaka wins a Nobel Prize, and an annular solar eclipse is observed covering a large part of Japan for the first time in 932 years, amid concerns such as consumption tax and welfare ("金" is also the first kanji to be selected more than once).	
2013	輪	rin wa	wheel ring	Successful bid to host the 2020 Summer Olympics. (the original Japanese word for "Olympics" is 五輪, literally meaning "five rings")	
2014	税	zei mitsugi	tax	Social discussion and additional expense tax in Japan. (VAT switching from 5% to 8%)	
2015	安	an yasu	safety	Safety (安全) issues concerning explosion in Yasukuni Shrine, terrorist attack on Paris, and the public outcry at the new State Secrecy Law devised by prime minister Shinzo Abe (安倍晋三).	
2016	金	kin kane	gold money	High number of gold medals won at the 2016 Rio Olympics, the shift to minus interest (“interest rate” is “kinri” in Japanese), Trump’s U.S. presidential election victory (“blonde hair” is “kinpatsu”), and Piko Taro, singer of ‘PPAP’, who's known for wearing a gold-colored animal print outfit. (This is the third time this kanji has taken this honor.)	
2017	北	hoku kita	north	North Korea's missile tests and nuclear test, the heavy rain in northern Kyushu, and the poor harvest of potatoes in Hokkaido.	
2018	災	sai wazawa-i	disaster	The 2018 Osaka earthquake along with the heavy floods in southwestern Japan. This Kanji was also selected in 2004 as Kanji of the Year.	
2019	令	rei ryou	good order	Japanese era name was changed into Reiwa (令和; "good harmony"). As safety measures against the storm and downpour caused by Typhoon Faxai and Typhoon Hagibis in Kantō region, the government issued ("issuing order" is "hatsurei (発令)" in Japanese) evacuation orders.	
2020	密	mitsu hiso-ka	secret close	Reference to the san mitsu (３密; the three Cs), a government recommendation to avoid closed spaces, crowds and close contact due to the COVID-19 pandemic. It also references how people were brought closer together thanks to the stay-at-home directive. 'Mitsu' additionally alludes to secrets unveiled in the political and entertainment worlds in 2020.	
2021	金	kin kane	gold money	Reference to the gold medals of the Tokyo 2020 Olympics and Paralympics, which proceeded this July after being postponed but under special restrictions due to the COVID-19 pandemic, as well as other great sporting achievements by Japanese athletes during the year. Shohei Ohtani was awarded the Major League Baseball Most Valuable Player Award, while Sōta Fujii became the youngest ever 4-crown shogi title holder. In addition, new designs for Japanese banknotes were unveiled, and a new 500 yen coin was introduced into circulation.	
2022	戦	sen ikusa	war battle	Reference to the Russian invasion of Ukraine and the assassination of Shinzo Abe.	
2023	税	zei mitsugi	tax	Reference to tax hikes and cuts, introduction of a new invoice system, and municipal tax payments in exchange for gifts.	
2024	金	kin kane	gold money	Issues related to money, such as the "secret funds" involving Liberal Democratic Party lawmakers, underground part-time jobs (yami baito) motivated by money, the 1.03 million yen income cap, and rising prices, have been prominent. Events like the issuance of new banknotes, the World Heritage Site registration of the Sado Gold Mine, and the excitement across Japan over the national team's gold medal wins at the Paris Olympics and Paralympics, as well as Shohei Ohtani's records in Major League Baseball, also made headlines.	
2025	熊	yuu kuma	bear	Increase of bear sightings and attacks around Japan, and the returning of four panda bears to China	

Japan also holds an annual word of the year contest called "the New Word/Trendy Phrase Award" (Shingo ryūkōgo taishō), sponsored by the Jiyu Kokuminsha publisher (by U-CAN since 2004).
