= Word of the year (Ukraine) =

Most important year chosen by poll in Ukraine

In Ukraine, the Word of the Year (Ukrainian: Слово року) poll is carried out since 2013 by Myslovo online user-generated dictionary of Ukrainian slang and neologisms.

== Winners ==
- 2013: «Євромайдан» — «Euromaidan». The word also took the second place in the Russian Word of the year poll.
- 2014: «кіборги» — "cyborgs" (a moniker for Ukrainian military defending Donetsk Airport).
- 2015: «блокада» — blockade (because of blockade of Russian-annexed Crimea).
- 2016: «корупція» — corruption (emphasizing the damaging effect it has on Ukrainian state).
- 2017: «безвіз» — "bezviz" (a neologism meaning the visa-free regime between Ukraine and the European Union. "bez viz" literally means "without visas").
- 2018: «томос» — tomos (in reference of the recognition of the autocephaly of the Orthodox Church of Ukraine).
- 2019: «діджиталізація» — digitalization (in reference to the creation of the Ministry of Digital Transformation)
- 2020: «коронавірус» — coronavirus (in reference to the COVID-19 pandemic)
- 2021: «вакцина» — vaccine (in reference to the COVID-19 pandemic)
- 2022: «русский военный корабль, иди на хуй» — Russian warship, go fuck yourself (in reference to the Russian invasion of Ukraine)
