= Lists of Merriam-Webster's Words of the Year =

Merriam-Webster's Words of the Year are words of the year lists published annually by the American dictionary-publishing company Merriam-Webster, Inc. The lists feature ten words from the English language. These word lists started in 2003 and have been published at the end of each year.

The Words of the Year usually reflect events that happened during the years the lists were published. For example, the Word of the Year for 2005, 'integrity', showed that the general public had an immense interest in defining this word amid ethics scandals in the United States government, corporations, and sports. The Word of the Year for 2004, 'blog', was looked up on the Online Dictionary the most as blogs began to influence mainstream media. In 2006, Merriam-Webster received a lot of publicity as 'truthiness', a word coined by Stephen Colbert on The Colbert Report, topped the list.

== Selection process ==
When the Word of the Year was started in 2003, Merriam-Webster determined which words would appear on the list by analyzing page hits and popular searches to its website. For example, the 2003 and 2004 lists were determined by online hits to the Merriam-Webster Online Dictionary and Online Thesaurus and to Merriam-WebsterCollegiate.com. In 2006 and 2007, Merriam-Webster changed this practice, and the list was determined by an online poll among words that were suggested by visitors to the site. Visitors were requested to vote for one entry out of a list of twenty words and phrases. The list consisted of the words and phrases that were frequently looked up on the site and those that were submitted by many readers. From 2008 onwards, however, user submissions have not been a deciding factor, and the list has been composed only of the words which were looked up most frequently that year. Merriam-Webster said that the reason for the change was that otherwise ordinary words were receiving so many hits that their significance could not be ignored.

== Words of the Year ==
Year	Word	Definition
2003	democracy	(noun) State governed by the people or by officials elected by the people.
2004	blog	(noun) Online journal where the writer presents a record of activities, thoughts, or beliefs.
2005	integrity	(noun) Adherence to moral or ethic principles; incorruptibility.
2006	truthiness	(noun) Truth coming from the gut, not books; preferring to believe what you wish to believe, rather than what is known to be true.
2007	w00t	(interjection) Expressing joy.
2008	bailout	(noun) A rescue from financial distress.
2009	admonish	(verb) to express warning or disapproval to especially in a gentle, earnest, or solicitous manner.
2010	austerity	(noun) Severity of manners or life; extreme rigor or strictness; harsh discipline.
2011	pragmatic	(adjective) Practical, concerned with making decisions and actions that are useful in practice, not just theory.
2012	socialism	(noun) Any of various economic and political philosophies that support social equality, collective decision-making, distribution of income based on contribution and public ownership of productive capital and natural resources, as advocated by socialists.
2012	capitalism	(noun) A socio-economic system based on private property rights, including the private ownership of resources or capital, with economic decisions made largely through the operation of a market unregulated by the state.
2013	science	(noun) Knowledge about or study of the natural world based on facts learned through experiments and observation.
2014	culture	(noun) The beliefs, customs, arts, etc., of a particular society, group, place, or time.
2015	-ism	(suffix) A suffix that forms abstract nouns of action, state, condition, doctrine.
2016	surreal	(adjective) Marked by the intense irrational reality of a dream.
2017	feminism	(noun) The theory of the political, economic, and social equality of the sexes.
2018	justice	(noun) The maintenance or administration of what is just especially by the impartial adjustment of conflicting claims or the assignment of merited rewards or punishments.
2019	they	(pronoun) Used to refer to a single person whose gender is intentionally not revealed, or —Used to refer to a single person whose gender identity is nonbinary.
2020	pandemic	(noun) An outbreak of a disease that occurs over a wide geographic area (such as multiple countries or continents) and typically affects a significant proportion of the population.
2021	vaccine	(noun) A preparation that is administered (as by injection) to stimulate the body's immune response against a specific infectious agent or disease.
2022	gaslighting	(noun) A psychological manipulation of a person usually over an extended period of time that causes the victim to question the validity of their own thoughts, perception of reality, or memories and typically leads to confusion, loss of confidence and self-esteem, uncertainty of one's emotional or mental stability, and a dependency on the perpetrator
2023	authentic	(adjective) Not false or imitation: real, actual
2024	polarization	(noun) Division into two sharply distinct opposites; especially, a state in which the opinions, beliefs, or interests of a group or society no longer range along a continuum but become concentrated at opposing extremes
2025	slop	(noun) Digital content of low quality that is produced usually in quantity by means of artificial intelligence

== Full list by year ==
=== 2003 ===
Rank	Word	Definition
1	democracy	(noun) State governed by the people or by officials elected by the people.
2	quagmire	(noun) Soft, muddy land; a predicament
3	quarantine	(noun) Period of time in which a person, animal, or ship that could possibly be carrying infection is kept apart; a period of 40 days.
4	matrix	(noun) Something from which something else originates, develops, or takes form; a mold or die; an electroplated impression of a phonograph record used to make duplicate records.
4	matrix	(noun in biology) The substance in which tissue cells are embedded.
4	matrix	(noun in math) The arrangement of a set of quantities in rows and columns.
4	matrix	(noun in geology) Fine-grained rock in which fossils, crystals, or gems are embedded.
5	marriage	(noun) Legally uniting two people as partners; wedlock; a close union or a wedding.
6	slog	(verb) To hit hard or beat heavily; to toil; walk or plod slowly.
6	slog	(noun) Laborious work; long, tiring walk or march; a heavy blow.
7	gubernatorial	(adjective) Of or relating to a governor.
8	plagiarism	(noun) The act of stealing from another author's works.
9	outage	(noun) Something lost after delivery or storage; temporary suspension of an operation, especially electric power.
10	batten	(verb) To grow fat, to feed greedily, or to live in luxury at the expense of others; to bolster or fasten with battens.
10	batten	(noun) A strip fixed to something to hold it firm.

John Morse, president of Merriam-Webster, pointed out that "the most frequently looked up words are not the newest words, not the latest high-tech terms, not the cool new slang." Instead, these top ten words correlated to breaking news stories and world events in 2003. The top word democracy correlated to the invasion of Iraq and the overthrow of Saddam Hussein's regime, quarantine to a SARS epidemic, and matrix to the film The Matrix Revolutions.

=== 2004 ===
Rank	Word	Definition
1	blog	(noun) Online journal where the writer presents a record of activities, thoughts, or beliefs.
2	incumbent	(noun) A person that possesses an ecclesiastical benefice or other office.
2	incumbent	(adjective) Lying on; resting on a person, obligatory.
3	electoral	(adjective) Pertaining to electors or elections; consisting of electors.
4	insurgent	(noun) A person who rebels or rises against authority.
4	insurgent	(adjective) Rising in revolt, refusing to accept authority.
5	hurricane	(noun) Violent, tropical cyclone of the western North Atlantic with wind speeds at or above 72 miles per hour (32 m/s); most severe, intense storm; anything that suggests a violent storm.
6	cicada	(noun) An insect of the family Cicadidae.
7	peloton	(noun) The main group of riders in a bicycle race.
8	partisan	(noun) A supporter of a cause, person, or group, especially a supporter with biased allegiance; a member of a military group harassing an enemy, especially a group engaged in guerrilla warfare against an occupying army.
9	sovereignty	(noun) Government free from external control; royal authority; a state's authority to govern another state.
10	defenestration	(noun) The act of throwing a thing or person out a window.

In 2004, blogs were becoming highly popular and began to influence mainstream media. During the twelve-month period that decides the word of the year, the term blog had the most requests for a definition or explanation, so a new entry was placed in Merriam-Webster's printed dictionary for 2005. The other words on this list, such as incumbent, electoral, and partisan, were associated with major news events, such as the United States presidential election of 2004 or natural disasters that hit the US.

=== 2005 ===
Rank	Word	Definition
1	integrity	(noun) Adherence to moral or ethic principles; incorruptibility.
2	refugee	(noun) One who flees for protection from danger or distress; one who flees to another country or place for safety.
3	contempt	(noun) Willful disobedience to or open disrespect of a court, judge or legislative body.
4	filibuster	(noun) Using delaying tactics in an attempt to delay or prevent action, especially in a legislative assembly.
5	insipid	(adjective) Lacking in taste; vapid, flat, dull, heavy, and spiritless.
6	tsunami	(noun) Very large ocean wave caused by an underwater earthquake or volcanic eruption.
7	pandemic	(noun) Occurring over a wide geographic area; affecting a large population.
8	conclave	(noun) Assembly of cardinals to elect the Roman Catholic pope; a secret assembly.
9	levee	(noun) A formal reception of guests, as in a royal court; a pier that provides a place to land at a river; an embankment that was made to prevent a river from overflowing.
10	inept	(adjective) Not apt or fitting, inappropriate; lack of judgement, sense, or reason; foolish; bungling or clumsy; incompetent.

For 2005, integrity was the most looked-up word in Merriam-Webster's Online Dictionary. According to John Morse, President of Merriam-Webster, the word integrity slowly moved up the list to first place in 2005 because ethics scandals emerged around the United States regarding corporations, government, and sports, such as the CIA leak investigations, scandals in Congress, and disgraced athletes.

Hurricane Katrina, the bird flu, and the death of Pope John Paul II renewed public interest in words such as refugee, tsunami, pandemic, conclave, and levee. The word refugee was also a candidate for the American Dialect Society's Word of the Year; according to Morse, the term gained notoriety as the entire country debated with how to describe people affected by Hurricane Katrina. The debate, over whether refugee was the proper term to describe displaced residents or whether the term was pejorative, summoned several Americans to look up the word in their dictionaries to form their own opinion. The word refugee received more queries in one month than most words in an entire year. The word insipid made the Top 10 list after Simon Cowell described Anthony Fedorov's performance in American Idol as "pleasant, safe, and a little insipid." At number 10 is inept, a word that received a lot of attention after the days when President George W. Bush delivered a live prime time news conference that came to an awkward end when some television networks cut him off to return to their regularly scheduled programs.

=== 2006 ===
Rank	Word	Definition
1	truthiness	(noun) Truth coming from the gut, not books; preferring to believe what you wish to believe, rather than what is known to be true.
2	google	(verb) Using the Google search engine to look up information about a person.
3	decider	(noun) A person who settles things in dispute or doubt.
4	war	(noun) A contest of armed forces between nations, countries, or parties.
4	war	(verb) To be in conflict or state of opposition.
4	war	(adjective) Related to, of, belonging to, used in, or due to such a contest or conflict.
5	insurgent	(noun) A person who rebels or rises against authority.
5	insurgent	(adjective) Rising in revolt, refusing to accept authority.
6	terrorism	(noun) Use of violence or threats to intimidate or coerce a person, especially for political purposes.
7	vendetta	(noun) A blood feud; prolonged and bitter feud, rivalry, or contention.
8	sectarian	(adjective) Pertaining to factions united under one doctrine, such as religious denominations; narrow-minded.
9	quagmire	(noun) Soft, wet, boggy land; a situation from which extrication is difficult.
10	corruption	(noun) Lack of integrity or honesty; decay; impairment of virtue and moral principles; undermining moral integrity; inducement by a public official with improper means to violate duties, for example, bribery.

After online visitors chose truthiness in a five-to-one majority vote as the Word of the Year of 2006, Merriam-Webster received a large amount of publicity. This was the first year in which Merriam-Webster used online voting to decide its Word of the Year. The term was created by Stephen Colbert on Comedy Central in The Colbert Report's first episode, which took place in October 2005, to describe things that he fervently believes to be the case regardless of the facts. In addition, truthiness became the American Dialect Society's Word of the Year for 2005.

=== 2007 ===
Rank	Word	Definition
1	w00t	(interjection) Expressing joy.
2	Facebook	(verb) To post a picture or other information to profile pages at the trademarked social networking website Facebook.
3	conundrum	(noun) A riddle whose answer is or involves a pun; question or problem with only a conjectural answer; intricate and difficult problem.
4	quixotic	(adjective) Foolishly impractical especially in the pursuit of ideals; loftily romantic or extravagantly chivalrous; capricious or unpredictable.
5	blamestorm	(verb) To hold a discussion in order to assign blame to a person for a failure.
6	sardoodledom	(noun) "A play with an overly contrived and melodramatic plot."
7	apathetic	(adjective) No feeling or passion, indifferent.
8	Pecksniffian	(adjective) Hypocritically benevolent.
9	hypocrite	(noun) Person who pretends to have virtues, beliefs, or principles that he or she does not actually possess.
10	charlatan	(noun) A person who pretends to have more knowledge and skill than he or she actually possesses.

John Morse, President of Merriam-Webster, said that the word w00t was a good choice because it "blends whimsy and new technology". Spelled with two zeros in leetspeak, w00t reflects a new direction in the English language led by a generation raised on video games and cell phone text messaging. While the word itself has not been published in its printed dictionary yet, Merriam-Webster claims that its presence in the Open Dictionary and the honors it's been awarded gives w00t a better chance at becoming an official word. It originally became popular in online gaming forums and is now used as an expression of excitement and joy. The word is also considered an acronym in the online gaming world for the phrase We owned the other team. This word was also used in the 1990 film Pretty Woman when Julia Roberts exclaimed "Woot, woot, woot!" to her date's friends during a polo match.

Placing second in 2007's contest, facebook created an unofficial verb out of the website Facebook. Founded in 2004, Facebook is a social network that allows its users to create a profile page and forge links with other friends and acquaintances.

=== 2008 ===
Rank	Word	Definition
1	bailout	(noun) A rescue from financial distress.
2	vet	(verb) To provide veterinary care for an animal or medical care for a person; to subject a person or animal to a physical examination or checkup; to subject to expert appraisal or correction; to evaluate for possible approval or acceptance.
3	socialism	(noun) economic or political theory advocating collective or governmental ownership and administration of the means of production and distribution of goods; society in which there is no private property; a stage of society in Marxist theory transitional between capitalism and communism and distinguished by unequal distribution of goods and pay according to work done.
4	maverick	(noun) unbranded range animal, especially a motherless calf; an independent individual who does not go along with a group or party.
5	bipartisan	(adjective) of, relating to, or involving members of two parties; specifically, marked by or involving cooperation, agreement, and compromise between two major political parties.
6	trepidation	(noun) A tremor; apprehension.
7	precipice	(noun) Very steep or overhanging place; a hazardous situation.
8	rogue	(noun) Vagrant or tramp; dishonest, worthless, or mischievous person; horse inclined to shirk or misbehave; individual with a chance and usually inferior biological variation.
9	misogyny	(noun) Hatred of women.
10	turmoil	(noun) a state or condition of extreme confusion, agitation, or commotion.

The word bailout became the word of the year amid the 2008 financial crisis, when the Emergency Economic Stabilization Act of 2008 was passed to bail out struggling banks.

=== 2009 ===
Rank	Word	Definition
1	admonish	(verb) to express warning or disapproval to especially in a gentle, earnest, or solicitous manner
2	emaciated	(verb) to have wasted away physically
3	empathy	(noun) the action of understanding, being aware of, being sensitive to, and vicariously experiencing the feelings, thoughts, and experience of another of either the past or present without having the feelings, thoughts, and experience fully communicated in an objectively explicit manner; also : the capacity for this
4	furlough	(noun) a leave of absence from duty granted especially to a soldier; also : a document authorizing such a leave of absence.
5	inaugurate	(verb) to induct into an office with suitable ceremonies
6	nugatory	(adjective) of little or no consequence
7	pandemic	(adjective) occurring over a wide geographic area and affecting an exceptionally high proportion of the population
8	philanderer	(noun) : one who has casual or illicit sex with a woman or with many women
9	repose	(verb) to lie at rest
10	rogue	(adjective) corrupt, dishonest

Interest in the word admonish peaked after Joe Wilson's outburst interrupting a speech by President Barack Obama resulted in his being admonished by a vote of the United States House of Representatives.

=== 2010 ===
Rank	Word	Definition
1	austerity	(noun) Severity of manners or life; extreme rigor or strictness; harsh discipline.
2	pragmatic	(adjective) Practical, concerned with making decisions and actions that are useful in practice, not just theory.
3	moratorium	(noun) A suspension of an ongoing activity.
4	socialism	(noun) Any of various economic and political philosophies that support social equality, collective decision-making, distribution of income based on contribution and public ownership of productive capital and natural resources, as advocated by socialists.
5	bigot	(noun) One who is obstinately or intolerantly devoted to his or her own opinions and prejudices.
6	doppelganger	(noun) A ghostly double of a living person, especially one that haunts such a person; An evil twin; A remarkably similar double; A person who has the same name as another; A fantastic monster that takes the forms of people, usually after killing them.
7	shellacking	(noun) A heavy defeat, drubbing, or beating; used particularly in sports and political contexts.
8	ebullient	(adjective) Boiling, agitated; enthusiastic, high-spirited.
9	dissident	(noun) A person who formally opposes the current political structure, opposes the political group in power, opposes the policies of the political group in power, or opposes current laws.
10	furtive	(adjective) Stealthy; Exhibiting guilty or evasive secrecy.

Austerity was the most searched-for word of 2010. Interest in the word reached its highest point around May 1, the day the Greek government announced a series of austerity measures, but its popularity remained strong throughout the year. Peter Sokolowski, Merriam-Webster editor-at-large, said: "Austerity clearly resonates with many people. We often hear it used in the context of government measures, but we also apply it to our own personal finances and what is sometimes called the new normal." Barack Obama used the word shellacking in November 2010, when acknowledging his party's losses in the US mid-term elections, and lookups of ebullient peaked in October, as thirty-three Chilean miners were successfully rescued after 69 days trapped underground.

=== 2011 ===
Rank	Word	Definition
1	pragmatic	(adjective) Practical, concerned with making decisions and actions that are useful in practice, not just theory.
2	ambivalence	(noun) The coexistence of opposing attitudes or feelings (such as love and hate) towards a person, object or idea; A state of uncertainty or indecisiveness.
3	insidious	(adjective) Producing harm in a stealthy, often gradual, manner; Intending to entrap; alluring but harmful.
4	didactic	(adjective) Instructive or intended to teach or demonstrate, especially with regard to morality; Excessively moralizing.
5	austerity	(noun) Severity of manners or life; extreme rigor or strictness; harsh discipline.
6	diversity	(noun) The quality of being diverse or different; difference or unlikeness.
7	capitalism	(noun) A socio-economic system based on private property rights, including the private ownership of resources or capital, with economic decisions made largely through the operation of a market unregulated by the state.
8	socialism	(noun) Any of various economic and political philosophies that support social equality, collective decision-making, distribution of income based on contribution and public ownership of productive capital and natural resources, as advocated by socialists.
9	vitriol	(noun) Bitterly abusive language.
10	après moi le déluge	(foreign term) "After me, the deluge", a remark attributed to Louis XV of France in reference to the impending end of a functioning French monarchy and predicting the French Revolution.

The word pragmatic was looked up on Merriam-Webster's website an unprecedented number of times in 2011. Although the popularity of the word wasn't linked to any specific event, it received the greatest amount of interest in the latter half of the year, as the United States Congress introduced the Budget Control Act, and its Supercommittee began to craft deficit-reduction plans. Ambivalence was also a popular word throughout the year; John Moore, President of Merriam-Webster, remarked: "We think it reflects the public attitude toward a wide range of issues, including the economy, the ongoing debates in Washington, the presidential election, and most recently the race for the Republican Party nomination." The term vitriol was used frequently in the wake of the January 2011 Tucson shooting, which led to a national debate about political rhetoric.

In November 2011, political commentator David Gergen rounded off a CNN article (entitled "Have they gone nuts in Washington?") with the phrase "après moi, le déluge". The expression, attributed to Louis XV, typifies the attitude of those who don't care about the future, because they won't be around to face the consequences of their actions.

=== 2012 ===
Rank	Word	Definition
1	socialism	(noun) Any of various economic and political philosophies that support social equality, collective decision-making, distribution of income based on contribution and public ownership of productive capital and natural resources, as advocated by socialists.
1	capitalism	(noun) A socio-economic system based on private property rights, including the private ownership of resources or capital, with economic decisions made largely through the operation of a market unregulated by the state.
2	touché	(interjection) An acknowledgement of the success, appropriateness or superiority of an argument or discussion.
3	bigot	(noun) One who is obstinately or intolerantly devoted to his or her own opinions and prejudices.
4	marriage	(noun) The state of being married; A union of two or more people that creates a family tie and carries legal and/or social rights and responsibilities; A ceremony in which people wed.
5	democracy	(noun) Rule by the people, especially as a form of government, either directly or through elected representatives; A government under the direct or representative rule of the people of its jurisdiction; Belief in political freedom and equality; the "spirit of democracy".
6	professionalism	(noun) The status, methods, character or standards expected of a professional or of a professional organization, such as reliability, discretion, evenhandedness, and fair play.
7	globalization	(noun) The process of going to a more interconnected world; The process of making world economy dominated by capitalist models.
8	malarkey	(noun) Nonsense; rubbish.
9	schadenfreude	(noun) Malicious enjoyment derived from observing someone else's misfortune.
10	meme	(noun) Any unit of cultural information, such as a practice or idea, that is transmitted verbally or by repeated action from one mind to another; A thought, idea, joke, or concept that spreads online, often virally, in the form of e.g. an image, a video, an email, an animation, or music.

The popularity of many of the words on Merriam-Webster's 2012 list were influenced by the commentary and debate that surrounded that year's US presidential election. Socialism and capitalism were frequently referred to during the party conventions and the televised debates; interest in socialism spiked on the day of the election – November 6, 2012. The word malarkey was used several times by Joe Biden during his vice-presidential debate with Paul Ryan on October 11, and meme captured the public imagination after a remark made by Mitt Romney about "binders full of women", on October 16, went viral.

Touché remained a popular word throughout the year. This was partly as a result of a new technology of the same name being announced by Disney Research; however, John Morse, President of Merriam-Webster, suggested that touché was "simply a word enjoying a period of increased popular use, perhaps as a byproduct of the growing amount of verbal jousting in our culture, especially through social media".

=== 2013 ===
Rank	Word	Definition
1	science	(noun) Knowledge about or study of the natural world based on facts learned through experiments and observation.
2	cognitive	(adjective) Of, relating to, being, or involving conscious intellectual activity.
3	rapport	(noun) A friendly relationship.
4	communication	(noun) The act or process of using words, sounds, signs, or behaviors to express or exchange information or to express your ideas, thoughts, feelings, etc., to someone else.
5	niche	(noun) A job, activity, etc., that is very suitable for someone; The situation in which a business's products or services can succeed by being sold to a particular kind or group of people
6	ethic	(noun) Rules of behavior based on ideas about what is morally good and bad.
7	paradox	(noun) Something (such as a situation) that is made up of two opposite things and that seems impossible but is actually true or possible.
8	visceral	(adjective) Coming from strong emotions and not from logic or reason.
9	integrity	(noun) The quality of being honest and fair; The state of being complete or whole.
10	metaphor	(noun) a word or phrase for one thing that is used to refer to another thing in order to show or suggest that they are similar; An object, activity, or idea that is used as a symbol of something else

The popularity of the word science in 2013 was driven by debates around climate change and science in education. Further debates around pseudoscience and whether science can answer all of life's questions further drove its popularity.

Cognitive's popularity was principally driven by ongoing issues with relation to concussion in American professional sports. The popularity of rapport and communication was principally driven by Edward Snowden's revelations around the NSA's global surveillance.

=== 2014 ===
Rank	Word	Definition
1	culture	(noun) The beliefs, customs, arts, etc., of a particular society, group, place, or time.
2	nostalgia	(noun) Pleasure and sadness that is caused by remembering something from the past and wishing that you could experience it again.
3	insidious	(adjective) Causing harm in a way that is gradual or not easily noticed.
4	legacy	(noun) Something that happened in the past or that comes from someone in the past.
5	feminism	(noun) The belief that men and women should have equal rights and opportunities
6	je ne sais quoi	(noun) A pleasant quality that is hard to describe.
7	innovation	(noun) A new idea, device, or method; the act or process of introducing new ideas, devices, or methods.
8	surreptitious	(adjective) Done in a secret way.
9	autonomy	(noun) The state of existing or acting separately from others; the power or right of a country, group, etc., to govern itself.
10	morbidity	(noun) The quality or state of being morbid

=== 2015 ===
Rank	Word	Definition
1	-ism	(suffix) A suffix that forms abstract nouns of action, state, condition, doctrine
2	socialism	(noun) Any of various economic and political theories advocating collective or governmental ownership and administration of the means of production and distribution of goods
3	fascism	(noun) A political philosophy, movement, or regime (as that of the Fascisti) that exalts nation and often race above the individual and that stands for a centralized autocratic government headed by a dictatorial leader
4	racism	(noun) A belief that race is the primary determinant of human traits and capacities and that racial differences produce an inherent superiority of a particular race
5	feminism	(noun) The belief that men and women should have equal rights and opportunities
6	communism	(noun) A theory advocating elimination of private property; a system in which goods are owned in common and are available to all as needed
7	capitalism	(noun) An economic system characterized by private or corporate ownership of capital goods, by investments that are determined by private decision, and by prices, production, and the distribution of goods that are determined mainly by competition in a free market
8	terrorism	(noun) The systematic use of terror especially as a means of coercion
9	marriage	(noun) The legally or formally recognized union of a man and a woman (or, in some jurisdictions, two people of the same sex) as partners in a relationship
10	hypocrite	(noun) A person who acts in contradiction to his or her stated beliefs or feelings

The suffix -ism traces its origins to Ancient Greek, Latin and medieval French. Originally, it turned a verb into a noun: think of baptize and baptism, criticize and criticism, or plagiarize and plagiarism. It has since acquired other uses, including identifying a religion or practice (Calvinism, vegetarianism), a prejudice based on a specific quality (sexism, ageism), an adherence to a system (stoicism, altruism), a condition based on excess of something (alcoholism), or a characteristic feature or trait (colloquialism).

=== 2016 ===
Rank	Word	Definition
1	surreal	(adjective) Marked by the intense irrational reality of a dream.
2	revenant	(noun) One that returns after death or a long absence.
3	icon	(noun) A person or thing widely admired especially for having great influence or significance in a particular sphere.
4	in omnia paratus	(latin phrase) Prepared in all things: ready for anything.
5	bigly	(adverb) In a big manner.
6	deplorable	(adjective) Deserving censure or contempt.
7	irregardless	(nonstandard adverb) Despite everything.
8	assumpsit	(noun) An express or implied promise or contract not under seal on which an action may be brought.
9	faute de mieux	(adverb) For lack of something better or more desirable.
10	feckless	(adjective) Weak, ineffective.

Searches for the word "surreal" spiked following Donald Trump's election as President of the United States in November 2016. The Revenant was a film released in late 2015 starring Leonardo DiCaprio. Searches for "icon" have been attributed to the death of Prince. Some listeners believed that Donald Trump uttered the term "bigly" during a September 27, 2016 debate against Hillary Clinton.

=== 2017 ===
Rank	Word	Notes
1	feminism	See below
2	complicit	
3	recuse	Jeff Sessions recused himself from investigations into Russian interference in the 2016 U.S. elections
4	empathy	
5	dotard	Kim Jong-un referred to Donald Trump as a dotard in an official statement
6	syzygy	Solar eclipse of August 21, 2017
7	gyro	The Tonight Show Starring Jimmy Fallon skit with Luke Bryan
8	federalism	Lindsey Graham referred to the vote on the Graham–Cassidy amendment as a choice between "socialism and federalism"
9	hurricane	2017 Atlantic hurricane season
10	gaffe	89th Academy Awards ceremony saw La La Land mistakenly announced as Best Picture winner

The word feminism spiked in interest at various points in 2017, corresponding to the 2017 Women's March, Kellyanne Conway saying she would not consider herself a feminist, the releases of feminist-themed media like The Handmaid's Tale and Wonder Woman, and the #MeToo movement.

=== 2018 ===
Rank	Word	Notes
1	justice	
2	nationalism	Used by Donald Trump at a rally.
3	pansexual	Janelle Monáe came out as pansexual.
4	lodestar	Used in the essay "I Am Part of the Resistance Inside the Trump Administration".
5	epiphany	The song "Epiphany" from BTS.
6	feckless	Samantha Bee called Ivanka Trump a "feckless cunt".
7	laurel	Yanny or Laurel trend.
8	pissant	Alex Reimer called Tom Brady's daughter a "pissant".
9	respect	Death of Aretha Franklin, who was known for the song "Respect".
10	maverick	Death of John McCain, who was often described as a "maverick".
11	excelsior	Death of Stan Lee, whose motto was "excelsior".

=== 2019 ===
Rank	Word	Definition
1	they	(pronoun) —Used to refer to a single person whose gender is intentionally not revealed, or —Used to refer to a single person whose gender identity is nonbinary
2	quid pro quo	(noun) "Something given or received for something else," or "A deal arranging a quid pro quo."
3	impeach	(verb) "To charge with a crime or misdemeanor" and "To cast doubt on."
4	crawdad	(noun) Refers to the aquatic animal that looks like a small lobster and lives in rivers and streams—i.e. to what's also known as a crawfish or crayfish.
5	egregious	(adjective) Modern English: "Conspicuously bad;" Original meaning: "Distinguished" or "Eminent."
6	clemency	(noun) Reduction of punishment.
7	the	(definite article) Pronounced /ðə/ before words that begin with consonants ("the governor") and /ði:/ before words that begin with a vowel; /ði:/ can also indicate emphasis or suggest uniqueness (THE Ohio State University).
8	snitty	(adjective) Disagreeably ill-tempered.
9	tergiversation	(noun) "Evasion of straightforward action or clear-cut statement," or "Desertion of a cause, position, party, or faith."
10	camp	(noun) "A style or mode of personal or creative expression that is absurdly exaggerated and often fuses elements of high and popular culture" or "Something so outrageously artificial, affected, inappropriate, or out-of-date as to be considered amusing."
11	exculpate	(verb) To clear from alleged fault or guilt.

Searches for they increased by 313% in 2019 over 2018; the use of they to refer to one person whose gender identity is nonbinary was added to the Merriam-Webster.com dictionary in September 2019. Quid pro quo is most often used in legal texts, and interest in the term is primarily attributed to the Trump–Ukraine scandal. Interest in crawdad is attributed to the novel Where the Crawdads Sing by Delia Owens. A Boeing pilot used egregious in describing an issue with the Boeing 737 MAX groundings. The Ohio State University tried to trademark the word The (later succeeding). Attorney General William Barr used snitty to describe the Mueller Report; Merriam-Webster describes the word as "a child of the 1970s." On January 23, The Washington Post columnist George Will wrote, "During the government shutdown, Graham’s tergiversations—sorry, this is the precise word—have amazed." A fashion exhibit at The Met sparked interest in camp.

=== 2020 ===
Rank	Word	Definition
1	pandemic	(noun) An outbreak of a disease that occurs over a wide geographic area (such as multiple countries or continents) and typically affects a significant proportion of the population.
2	Coronavirus	(noun) Any of a family (Coronaviridae) of large single-stranded RNA viruses that have a lipid envelope studded with club-shaped spike proteins, infect birds and many mammals including humans, and include the causative agents of MERS, SARS, and COVID-19.
3	defund	(verb) To withdraw funding from.
4	Mamba	(noun) Any of several chiefly arboreal venomous green or black elapid snakes (genus Dendroaspis) of sub-Saharan Africa.
5	Kraken	(noun) A Scandinavian sea monster.
6	quarantine	(noun) A restraint upon the activities or communication of persons or the transport of goods designed to prevent the spread of disease or pests.
7	antebellum	(adjective) Existing before a war, especially the American Civil War.
8	schadenfreude	(noun) Enjoyment obtained from the troubles of others.
9	asymptomatic	(adjective) Not causing, marked by, or presenting with signs or symptoms of infection, illness, or disease.
10	irregardless	(adjective) Nonstandard form of regardless.
11	icon	(noun) A person or thing widely admired especially for having great influence or significance in a particular sphere.
12	malarkey	(noun) Insincere or foolish talk.

Pandemic, coronavirus, quarantine, and asymptomatic are all in reference to the ongoing COVID-19 pandemic. Amid the George Floyd protests of May 2020 and beyond, many Black Lives Matter supporters called on local governments to "defund the police", leading defund to have a 6,059% increase in lookups from 2019 to 2020; ensuing national conversations about references to the American Civil War led to the country music trio formerly known as Lady Antebellum changing their name to Lady A, ensuing a similar 885% increase in lookups. Mamba and kraken are both sports references, to "The Black Mamba" Kobe Bryant who died in January 2020 and the expansion National Hockey League franchise Seattle Kraken, respectively. Actress Jamie Lee Curtis Tweeted in July 2020 that Merriam-Webster had recently added irregardless, a double negative, to the dictionary, although the dictionary had entered it in 1934. A frequent entry in victorious US Presidential candidate Joe Biden's vocabulary, malarkey saw its second appearance in the top 10, the other being in 2012 during his re-election campaign for Vice President.

=== 2021 ===
Rank	Word	
1	vaccine	People receive the very first dose of COVID-19 vaccines.
2	insurrection	January 6 United States Capitol attack
3	perseverance	NASA's launch of the Mars rover Perseverance. Also the Word of the Year according to Cambridge English Dictionary.
4	woke	
5	nomad	Nomadland gained attention after it won some Oscar awards.
6	infrastructure	
7	cicada	2021 emergence of Brood X cicadas.
8	murraya	Winning word of the 2021 Scripps National Spelling Bee.
9	cisgender	
10	guardian	
11	meta	A controversy causes Facebook to be renamed Meta.

=== 2022 ===
Rank	Word	Notes
1	gaslighting	
2	oligarch	Sanctions were placed on Russian oligarchs.
3	omicron	Omicron variant of COVID-19.
4	codify	Respect for Marriage Act codified same-sex and interracial marriage nationally in the United States.
5	LGBTQIA	
6	sentient	A Google engineer claimed its AI was sentient.
7	loamy	A difficult answer to Quordle, a Wordle-like game.
8	raid	FBI raid of Mar-a-Lago
9	queen consort	Death of Elizabeth II, accession of Charles III, and naming of Queen Camilla as queen consort

=== 2023 ===
Rank	Word	Notes
1	authentic	
2	rizz	
3	deepfake	
4	coronation	Coronation of Charles III and Camilla.
5	dystopian	
6	EGOT	Viola Davis won an EGOT.
7	X	Renaming of Twitter to X.
8	implode	Implosion of the Titan submersible.
9	Doppelgänger	
10	covenant	Multiple events: school shooting at The Covenant School, release of Guy Ritchie's The Covenant and The Covenant of Water, and reports of Mike Johnson using Covenant Eyes.
11	indict	Indictments against Donald Trump.
12	element	Release of the film Elemental.
13	kibbutz	
14	deadname	

The increase in searches for authentic was driven by stories and conversations about artificial intelligence (AI), celebrity culture, identity and social media, with AI technologies like deepfake blurring the lines between "real" and "fake". The coronation of Charles III and Camilla took place on May 6, 2023. Interest in dystopian was driven by warning about AI as well as the 2023 Canadian wildfires, which in June covered much of Canada and the United States in smoke, evoking a "dystopian landscape". The actress Viola Davis achieved the EGOT in February. The social media networking service Twitter was rebranded to X by owner Elon Musk in July.

The submersible Titan imploded while on an expedition to the wreck of the Titanic. Doppelgänger saw multiple spikes from independent events, one of which was the release of the book Doppelganger by academic and activist Naomi Klein. The same goes for covenant; event that drove an increase in lookups for the word include a school shooting at The Covenant school at Nashville, Tennessee, the release of the film Guy Ritchie's The Covenant and the novel The Covenant of Water. Former US president Donald Trump was indicted on four separate cases. Pixar released the animated film Elemental. In the 2023 Hamas-led attack on Israel, several kibbutzim were targeted. Searches for deadname increased due to the passage of anti-LGBT curriculum laws in several US states which prohibit or limit the mention or discussion of homosexuality and transgender identity in schools.

=== 2024 ===
Rank	Word	Notes
1	polarization	Political polarization in the United States
2	totality	2024 solar eclipse.
3	demure	Phrase popularized by TikToker Jools LeBron.
4	fortnight	Used in Taylor Swift's song "Fortnight".
5	pander	
6	resonate	Common word used in writing generated by ChatGPT.
7	allision	Nautical term for "collision" to describe the Francis Scott Key Bridge collapse.
8	weird	Used by Tim Walz to describe opponents.
9	cognitive	Refers to the more advanced use of AI.
10	democracy	

=== 2025 ===
Rank	Word	Notes
1	slop	
2	gerrymander	
3	touch grass	
4	performative	
5	tariff	Tariffs in the second Trump administration.
6	six seven	Originates from the song "Doot Doot (6' 7")".
7	conclave	The movie Conclave was first released in August 2024.
8	Lake Chargoggagoggmanchauggagoggchaubunagungamaugg	The original full name of a lake in Webster, Massachusetts (called Lake Webster for short).
