= Special military operation =

Russian term for the Russo-Ukrainian war

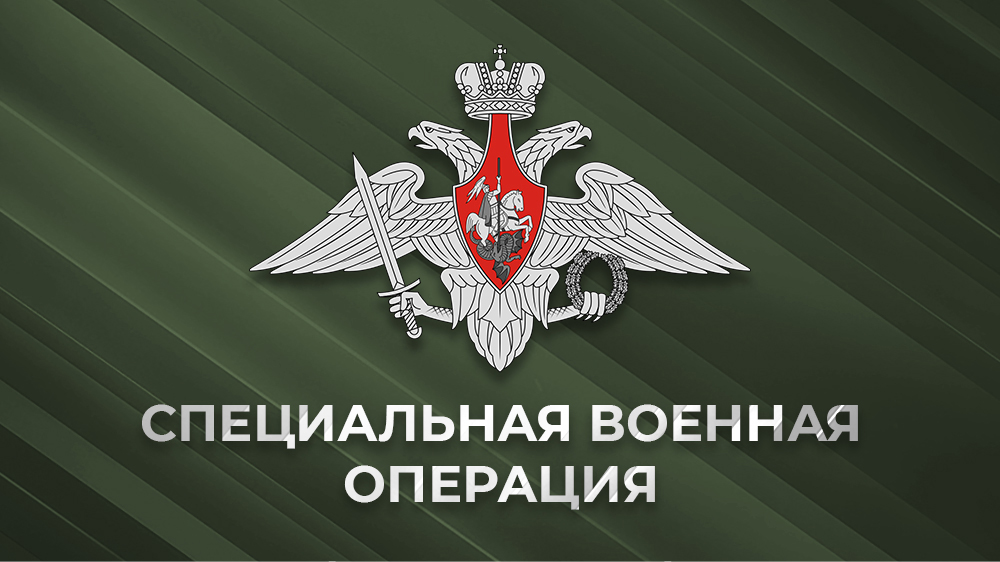
A banner of the Russian Ministry of Defence with the phrase "special military operation"

"Special military operation" (Note: Russian: специа́льная вое́нная опера́ция, romanized: spetsial'naya voyennaya operatsiya; Ukrainian: спеціальна воєнна операція, romanized: spetsial'na voyenna operatsiya) (also "special operation", and abbreviated as "SMO" or "SVO", or Russian: спецопера́ция, romanized: spetsoperatsiya, Ukrainian: спецопера́ція) is the official term used by the Russian government to describe the Russo-Ukrainian war that began in February 2022 following the Russian invasion of Ukraine. It is widely considered a euphemism intended to minimize the invasion and obfuscate the war's original objective of annexing all Russophone regions of Ukraine.

Russia has banned the use of the terms "war" or "invasion" in referring to its invasion of Ukraine, as well as discussion of the censorship itself. The expression appears prominently in the public address by Russian President Vladimir Putin, released on 24 February 2022. The term "special military operation" has been used in Ukrainian media in specific contexts, generally in scare quotes, to mock or criticize the Russian invasion.

== History ==
The use of euphemisms to describe military activities was common in the Soviet Union and in the Russian Federation after the collapse of communist rule prior to the invasion of Ukraine; this includes:

- Soviet invasion of Poland (1939) as "liberation campaign of the Red Army", (Note: Russian: освободительный поход РККА, romanized: osvoboditel'nyy pokhod RKKA, where RККА stands for the long-form of the Red Army) then subsequently "combat operations during the reunification of the USSR, Western Ukraine and Western Belarus" (Note: Russian: боевые действия при воссоединении СССР, Западной Украины и Западной Белоруссии)
- Warsaw Pact invasion of Czechoslovakia (1968) as "friendly assistance to the fraternal people of Czechoslovakia" (Note: Russian: дружеская помощь братскому народу Чехословакии) (not officially considered a military operation by Russia as of 2025)
- Soviet–Afghan War (1979–1989); at first officially named "the introduction of a limited contingent of Soviet troops into Afghanistan", (Note: Russian: введение ограниченного контингента советских войск в Афганистан) then later called "combat operations in Afghanistan" (Note: Russian: боевые действия в Афганистане)
- First Chechen War (1994–1996) as the "operation on the restoration of the constitutional order in Chechnya", (Note: Russian: операция по восстановлению конституционного порядка в Чечне) and then afterwards as "an armed conflict in the Chechen Republic and in the adjacent territories of the Russian Federation, assigned to the zone of armed conflict" (Note: Russian: вооруженный конфликт в Чеченской Республике и на прилегающих к ней территориях Российской Федерации, отнесенных к зоне вооруженного конфликта)
- Second Chechen War (1999–2009) being described as part of a "counter-terrorist operation on the territory of the North Caucasus region" (Note: Russian: контртеррористических операций на территории Северо-Кавказского региона)
- Russo-Georgian War (2008) as a "special peace enforcement operation" (Note: Russian: специальная операция по принуждению к миру) for "ensuring the security and protection of citizens of the Russian Federation living in the territories of the Republic of South Ossetia and the Republic of Abkhazia"
- In 2014 Little green men, masked soldiers of the Russian Federation who appeared during the Russo-Ukrainian war carrying weapons and equipment, but wearing unmarked green army uniforms and called "polite people" in Russian media.
- In a 24 February 2022 television appearance, Vladimir Putin announced the Russian invasion of Ukraine in his speech "On conducting a special military operation". As is usual since the middle 20th century, the two governments did not formally declare war.

In the broader context of international relations, when evaluating the histories of the continents of Africa and North America, the specific labels of the Biafran War as a "police action" and as well as the Korean War as a "police action" and Police Actions (Indonesia) have attracted attention over the past several decades.

== Usage ==
According to some observers, such as Russian journalist Ksenia Turkova, the purpose of this terminology is mainly to create a perception that war is more benign than it actually is, by softening the wording in official reports and in the media.

=== Applications in Russian media ===
In Russian propaganda, the term "special military operation" is the main designation for aggression against Ukraine and is used to replace the definition of "war", which the Russian authorities and state media carefully avoided. On 24 February 2022, 6 hours after the start of the invasion of Russian troops into Ukraine, the Russian government tightened censorship by officially requiring the media to use only materials provided by Russian government sources. Subsequently, under pressure from the authorities, many organizations left the country or were closed. The Russian authorities blocked access to a number of Internet resources that refused to comply with the requirements.

In early November 2022, the "rule" was first violated by TV presenter Vladimir Solovyov during a radio broadcast; later on, the events in Ukraine were publicly called "war" by Vladimir Putin, Sergey Lavrov and Margarita Simonyan. In general, Russian authorities and media have tried to avoid the term "war" in the context of Ukraine, instead using it in terms like "gas war" or "information war". In March 2024, Kremlin spokesperson Dmitry Peskov said that the invasion was a "de jure a special military operation" which, after foreign countries began delivering military aid to Ukraine, devolved into a "de facto war" against the "collective West". In July 2026, Peskov again claimed that what had started as a "special military operation" was now a "real war" due to Western support for Ukraine.

=== Applications in other media ===
Certain internationally distributed news agencies, such as Al Jazeera English (AJE), have also used the term in instances with quotation marks applied and details provided about the war's conduct. For example, a March 2022 report by AJE stated that the terminology of having a "'special military operation' should be used to describe Moscow's assault on Ukraine" according to Russian officials because "the Kremlin has been working hard to promote its version of events in the face of widespread indignation and an anti-war movement at home".

On 20 September 2023, the Permanent Representative of Russia to the United Nations, Vasily Nebenzya accused the Prime Minister of Albania Edi Rama, who was serving as the council president, of turning a council meeting into "a one-man stand-up show" by allowing an appearance by President of Ukraine Volodymyr Zelenskyy, to which Rama replied "this is not a special operation by the Albanian presidency", adding: "There is a solution for this. If you agree, you stop the war and President Zelenskyy will not take the floor."

=== In colloquial speech ===
Social anthropologist Aleksandra Arkhipova noted that as of September 2022, the abbreviation "SVO" was more commonly used instead of "special operation". According to Arkhipova, this is due to the length of the full term, which is inconvenient in speech, and the concealment of the essence of the term in the abbreviation.

== Meaning and interpretation ==
Strictly speaking, a "special operation" (as defined by organizations like NATO) is a military term for a task that requires specially trained units for an unconventional operation. However, the meaning of the Russian "Special military operation" in Ukraine is different. This ambiguity was used to hide and distort the true meaning of what an "SVO" would entail, and has been described as an example of "doublespeak" and "doublethink".

Konstantin Gorobets, an associate professor at the University of Groningen, argued that, unlike "war", the term "special military operation" positioned Ukraine as a colony of Russia, denies it equal standing as a sovereign state, and uses the "language of policing". Gorobets says that the implication of the term is imperialistic, "because it assumes that Russia is using force within its own domain, of which Ukraine [in their view] is but a part."

== In popular culture ==
Due to its nature as an overt euphemism, the term has become an Internet meme that satirizes Russian propaganda. At the end of 2022, the euphemism won in the nomination "Expression of the Year" of Russia's "Word of the Year" competition (with the Russian word for war (война) being the overall winner). It was also selected as the 2022 Euphemism of the Year by the American Dialect Society.

The semi-official symbol of the term is the Latin letter "Z".

== See also ==
- Credibility gap – a term used to describe U.S. government dishonesty about the Vietnam War
- La guerre sans nom – "the war without a name"; what the Algerian War was called in France as it was occurring
