= Girlboss =

Term for an independent, successful woman

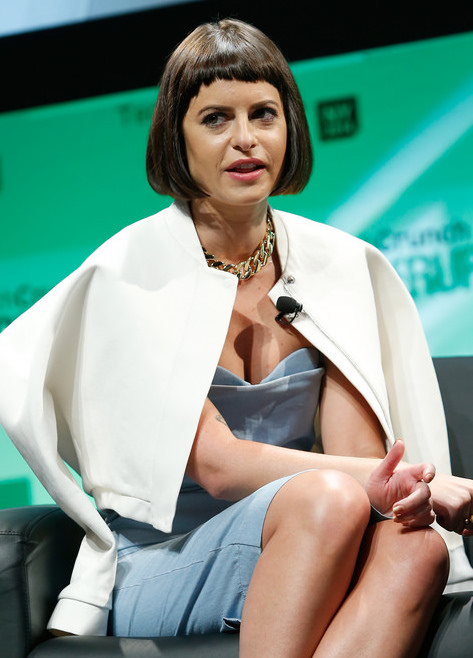
Sophia Amoruso wrote the 2014 book Girlboss.

"Girlboss" is a neologism that denotes a woman "whose success is defined in opposition to the masculine business world in which she swims upstream". They are described as confident and capable women who are successful in their career, or the one who pursues her own ambitions, instead of working for others or otherwise settling in life. A similar and related term is "boss babe".

Popularised by Sophia Amoruso in her 2014 book Girlboss, the concept's ethos has been described as "convenient incrementalism"; the goal being not to dismantle the disproportionate power acquired by men under the coexistence of patriarchy and capitalism, but to take that power for women themselves. This has led to sarcastic and pejorative undertones when using the term, denoting women who attempt to raise their professional lives by practicing the same abusive and materialistic practices found in patriarchal society.

== History ==
The term became popular in 2014 after Sophia Amoruso used it with a hashtag prefix in her bestselling autobiography, which was adapted into a TV show of the same name. Its early usage was defined by perceived empowerment. Its popularity led to it becoming "a template for marketing and writing about powerful women in virtually every industry". By 2019, the concept had begun to receive disdain from some women and viewed as ironic; others still believed it had worth. In 2022, Amoruso herself tweeted "Please stop using the word Girlboss thank you."

Some audiences began to critique the girlboss for pursuing individual successes instead of working to weaken the forces of the patriarchy and pursue broader structural change. However, some believe that individual women's achievements can still be praised, and that this is not mutually exclusive with also working toward better workplaces and positive change on the societal level. Martha Gill of The Guardian writes that feminist movements can "push for change and help women in an imperfect world", yet still "celebrate women who succeed anyway".

In early 2020, the self-regulatory organisation Advertising Standards Authority (ASA) in the United Kingdom banned a billboard, advertising PeoplePerHour, which read: "You do the girl boss thing we'll do the SEO thing". Later in 2020, the George Floyd protests saw a number of high-profile women executives resign after accusations of creating toxic and racist workplaces. According to Amanda Mull of The Atlantic, this time saw the "end of the girlboss" manifest in a "cultural pushback". Judy Berman of Time stated that the rise of anti-capitalist sentiment among youth had turned the term "into a joke, a meme, something hopelessly cheugy". Alex Abad-Santos of Vox argued that the term has "shifted culturally from a noun to a verb, one that described the sinister process of capitalist success and hollow female empowerment", pointing to the parody phrase "Gaslight, Gatekeep, Girlboss".

In 2021, some social media influencers attempted to redefine the term as "a sort of post-ironic area in which female evil is celebrated", such as over the trial of Elizabeth Holmes. To some, Holmes served as "the quintessential girlboss", and her trial revealed many of the shortcomings present within the girlboss ideology and, more broadly, the attempts to use feminism in order to minimize women's accountability regarding their decisions. A number of 2021 films and television series were criticised for exemplifying the term, such as Physical. In September 2021, University of Sydney Dean of the Faculty of Arts and Social Sciences Annamarie Jagose referenced the term while defending proposed cuts at the university, stating "Girlboss feminism? I'm not sure what girlboss feminism is."

== Reception and interpretations ==
For a time, female wealth was treated as feel-good news unto itself. The reality of girlbossing, however, was always a little bit messier... The confident, hardworking, camera-ready young woman of a publicist's dreams apparently had an evil twin: a woman, pedigreed and usually white, who was not only as accomplished as her male counterparts, but just as cruel and demanding too.

— Amanda Mull, The Atlantic

According to Magdalena Zawisza, associate professor of gender psychology at Anglia Ruskin University, "It is very difficult to escape the deeply rooted gender stereotypes, and many such linguistic attempts backfire ... While 'girl boss' immediately draws attention to the feminine, it also infantilizes the role of a female as a boss." Mull critiqued the idea for reinforcing power structures created by men.

Similarly, some claim that while it is important to draw attention towards women's successes, placing too much of an emphasis on their gender can imply that these successes are merely abnormal exceptions to common gender norms or are inherently different from the successes of men. Stav Atir from the University of Wisconsin-Madison suggests that "we intuitively understand that using a different word for women in male-dominated fields suggests that these women are aberrations – exceptions that prove the rule," and 'girlboss' is one of these terms that many insinuate a woman's natural inability to lead.

Gargi Agrawal of Elle argued that "the idea propagates sexism, racism and class elitism." Journalist Vicky Spratt argued that the term was "a sexist Trojan horse ... if we weren't so scared of women's power we wouldn't need to do this, to make it more palatable by rolling it in glitter and pinkwashing it."

Hannah Ewens of Vice noted that, although the idea is one of the 2010s, its roots go back to the 1980s: "The Working Woman of the Thatcher and Reagan era, strutting in wearing her power suit, had both the boss and the baby on a leash." Emma Maguire, in an article for The Conversation, echoed a similar sentiment, saying that the idea of girlboss was only possible through feminist achievements. She chose June Dally-Watkins as an example of a historical girlboss. Ewens viewed a girlboss as a multi-tasking woman who doesn't view family as a priority and "deceptively dissolves class without understanding or interacting with it". Maguire wrote that "Girlboss rhetoric often works to propagate sexism, racism, and class elitism, among other forms of oppression."

Ewens highlighted Paris Hilton, Gwyneth Paltrow, Jessica Alba and Sarah Michelle Gellar as examples of girlbosses. Mull called The Wing "an incubator of sorts for girlbosses". Former Teen Vogue executive editor Samhita Mukhopadhyay argued that "for women, navigating the workplace has always been about figuring out which tropes to avoid – we quickly learn not to be the doormat or the shrew, the secretary or the nag – and it seemed as though the death of the girlboss had set another trap."
