= Live, Laugh, Love =

Motivational phrase popular in home decor

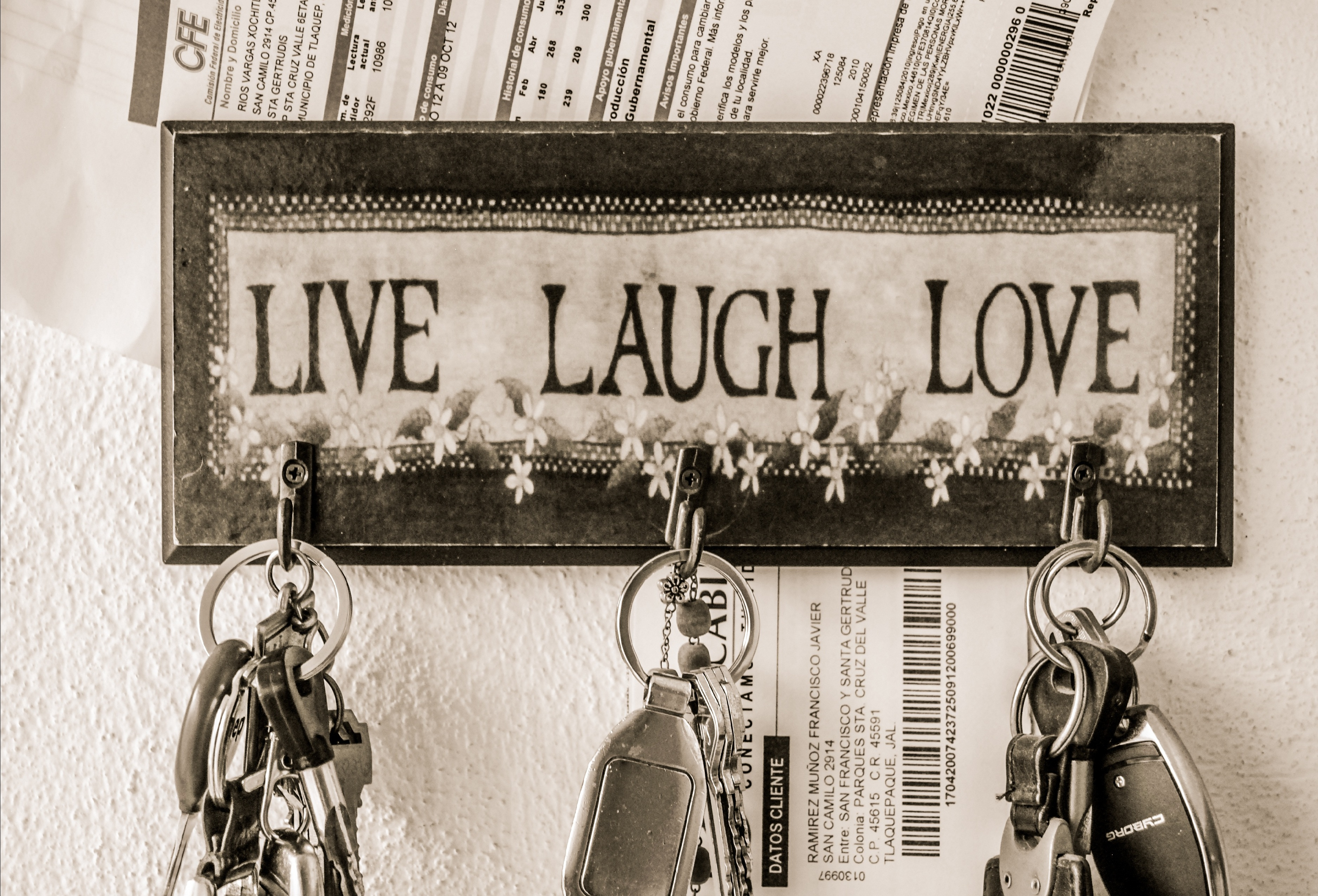
A decorative key holder bearing the phrase, from 2012.

"Live, Laugh, Love" is an alliterative, motivational three-word phrase that became a popular slogan on motivational posters and home decor in the late 2000s and early 2010s. By extension, the saying has also become pejoratively associated with a style of "basic" Generation X decor and with what Vice described as "speaking-to-the-manager shallowness".

The phrase is an abridged form of the 1904 poem "Success" by Bessie Anderson Stanley which begins:

He achieved success who has lived well, laughed often, and loved much

The phrase first appears as a lyric in the 1926 song "When the Red, Red Robin", most famously recorded by singer, actor, and vaudevillian Al Jolson.

Wake up, wake up you sleepy head,
Get up, get up, get out of bed,
Cheer up, cheer up, the sun is red,
Live, love, laugh and be happy

This phrase was subsequently popularized by Ann Landers and a 1990 Dear Abby column, where it was misattributed to Ralph Waldo Emerson.

== 2000s–2010s merchandise ==
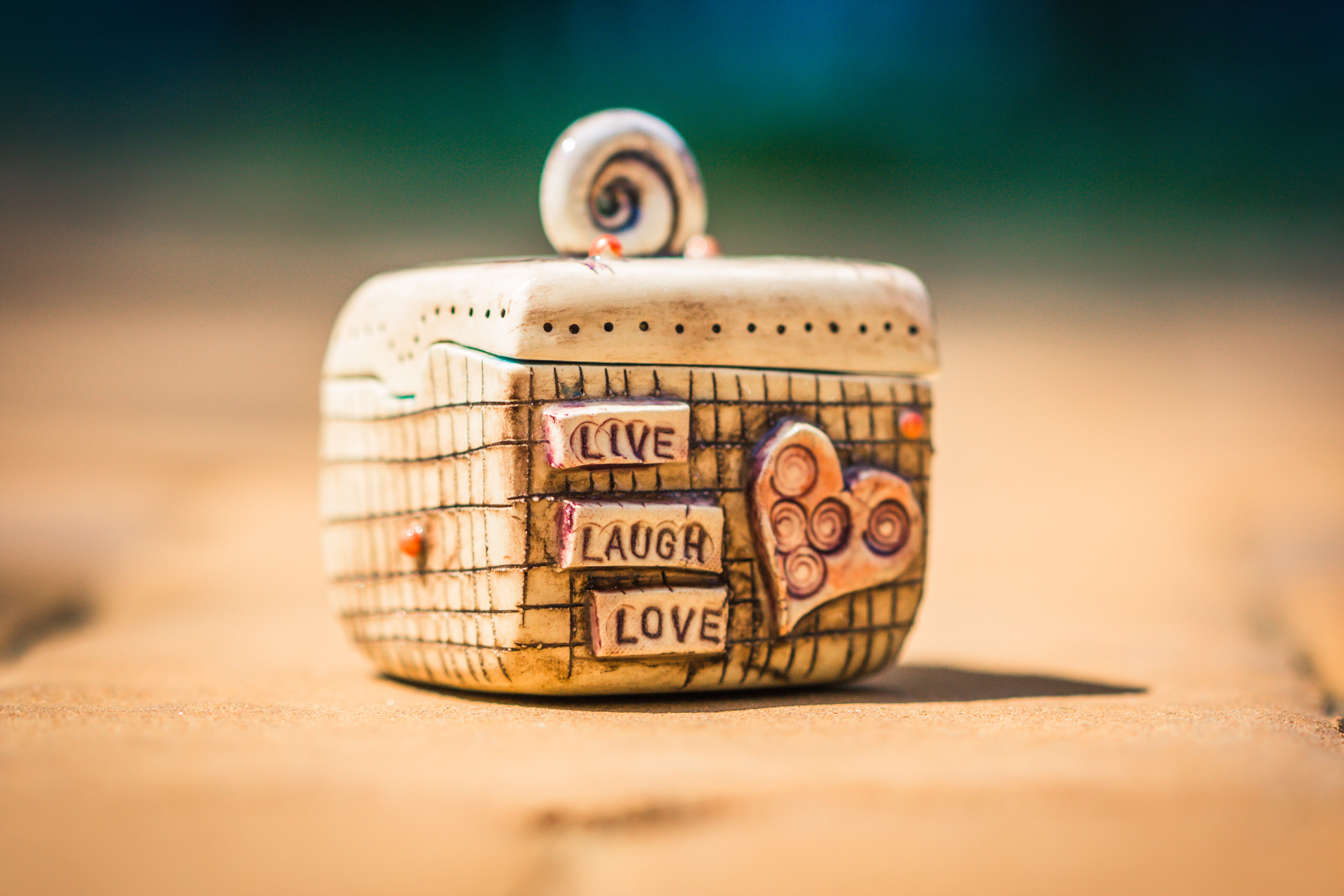
A small container bearing the slogan

"Live, Laugh, Love" and variants on the phrase have appeared on framed posters, wall decals, ornaments, cushions, mugs, bed linen, jewellery and even on coffins. The Live Love Laugh Foundation, a mental health organization in India founded by Deepika Padukone, takes its name from the phrase.

Vice noted that the trend had largely passed by 2020. In 2021, Google Trends shows that searches for the phrase peaked between 2009 and 2014 in the United States, falling in popularity since then.

== See also ==
- Keep Calm and Carry On, another motivational phrase, originally from World War II in Great Britain, that became popular around the same time.
