= American Dialect Society =

Society on linguistics

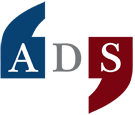
- Organization logo
- Abbreviation: ADS
- Formation: March 13, 1889; 137 years ago
- Type: Nonprofit
- Purpose: "Encourage the study of any aspect of all languages and dialects used or found in North America (including associated islands) and in the Caribbean Basin, and the languages that influence them."
- Location: United States
- Region served: North America
- Members: 253
- Official language: English
- President: Joseph Salmons
- Vice President for Communications and Technology: Grant Barrett
- Executive Director: Betsy E. Evans
- Affiliations: American Council of Learned Societies (admitted 1962)
- Website: americandialect.org

The American Dialect Society (ADS), founded in 1889, is a learned society "dedicated to the study of the English language in North America, and of other languages, or dialects of other languages, influencing it or influenced by it". The Society publishes the academic journal American Speech.

Since its foundation, dialectologists in English-speaking North America have affiliated themselves with the American Dialect Society, an association which in its first constitution defined its objective as "the investigation of the spoken English of the United States and Canada". Over the years, its objective has remained essentially the same, only expanded to encompass "the English language in North America, together with other languages or dialects of other languages influencing it or influenced by it".

The Society is perhaps best known publicly for its annual Word of the Year vote, which has been held since 1991 and is the oldest English-language word-of-the-year selection not tied to commercial interests. The vote takes place each January at the Society's annual meeting, which is held in conjunction with the Linguistic Society of America.

== History ==
The organization was founded as part of an effort to create a comprehensive American dialect dictionary, a near century-long undertaking that culminated in the publication of the Dictionary of American Regional English. In 1889, when Joseph Wright began editing the English Dialect Dictionary, a group of American philologists founded the American Dialect Society with the ultimate purpose of producing a similar work for the United States.

Members of the Society began to collect material, much of which was published in the Society's journal Dialect Notes (1889-1939), but little was done toward compiling a dictionary recording nationwide usage until Frederic G. Cassidy was appointed Chief Editor in 1963. Cassidy trained teams of fieldworkers and equipped them with a carefully worded questionnaire containing 1,847 questions grouped in 41 broad categories. From 1965 to 1970, fieldworkers conducted interviews with natives of 1,002 representative communities across all fifty states, collecting approximately 2.5 million items of data.

The first volume of the Dictionary of American Regional English, covering the letters A-C, was published in 1985. The final volume appeared in 2012, with a sixth supplementary volume published in 2013.

The other major project of the Society is the Linguistic Atlas of the United States and Canada. Initiated in the 1930s under the direction of Hans Kurath, the Linguistic Atlas Project remains one of the most comprehensive studies of American English dialects ever undertaken.

== Publications ==
=== American Speech ===
The Society's primary publication is American Speech, a quarterly academic journal founded in 1925 at the instigation of H. L. Mencken and Professor Louise Pound, the first woman to serve as president of the Modern Language Association. The journal is concerned with all aspects of the English language in North America, as well as other languages that influence or are influenced by it. American Speech is published by Duke University Press and is not committed to any particular theoretical framework.

Regular features include a book review section, a "Miscellany" section devoted to brief essays and notes, and "Among the New Words," a column introduced in 1941 by Dwight Bolinger that documents recent neologisms.

=== Publication of the American Dialect Society (PADS) ===
The Society also produces the Publication of the American Dialect Society (PADS), an annual hardcover monograph series that serves as a supplement to American Speech. PADS volumes feature in-depth studies on various aspects of American English dialects and linguistic variation.

== Membership ==
The Society has never had more than a few hundred active members, with membership listed at 253. With so few scholars advancing the enterprise, the developments in the field came slowly. Members of the organization include "linguists, lexicographers, etymologists, grammarians, historians, researchers, writers, authors, editors, professors, university students, and independent scholars."

Membership benefits include a subscription to American Speech, one volume of PADS each year, access to the online archives of both publications, and participation in the Society's annual conference and Word of the Year vote.

The Society's activities include a mailing list, which deals chiefly with American English but also carries some discussion of other issues of linguistic interest.

== Word of the Year ==
Since 1991, the American Dialect Society has designated one or more words or terms to be the word of the year. The tradition was initiated by Allan Metcalf, executive secretary of the ADS, who organized the first vote in January 1991 for the word of 1990. The New York Times stated that the American Dialect Society "probably started" the "word-of-the-year ritual". However, the "Gesellschaft für deutsche Sprache" (GfdS) has announced a word of the year since 1977.

The ADS Word of the Year is notable as the oldest English-language word-of-the-year selection and the only one determined by a public vote of independent linguists rather than commercial interests. The vote takes place at the Society's annual meeting each January, with participants including both ADS members and interested attendees. Words are selected based on being demonstrably new or newly popular in the year in question and widely or prominently used.

Special votes that they have made:

- Word of the 20th Century: jazz
- Word of the Past Millennium: she
- Word of the Decade (1990–1999): web
- Word of the Decade (2000–2009): Google (verb)
- Word of the Decade (2010–2019): they (singular)

The society also selects words in other categories that vary from year to year, such as "most original", "most unnecessary", "most outrageous", or "most likely to succeed" (see: Word of the year).

A number of words chosen by the ADS are also on the lists of Merriam-Webster's Words of the Year.

=== List of Words of the Year ===
Year	Word	Notes
1990	bushlips	(similar to "bullshit" – stemming from President George H. W. Bush's 1988 "Read my lips: no new taxes" promise)
1991	mother of all –	(as in Saddam Hussein's foretold "Mother of all battles")
1992	Not!	(meaning "just kidding")
1993	information superhighway	
1994	Tie: cyber and morph	(to change form)
1995	Tie: World Wide Web and newt	(as a verb: to make aggressive changes as a newcomer).
1996	mom	(as in "soccer mom").
1997	millennium bug	
1998	e-	(as in "e-mail").
1999	Y2K	
2000	chad	(from the 2000 Presidential Election controversy in Florida).
2001	9-11, 9/11 or September 11	
2002	weapons of mass destruction or WMD	
2003	metrosexual	
2004	red/blue/purple states	(from the 2004 presidential election).
2005	truthiness	popularized on The Colbert Report.
2006	to be plutoed, to pluto	(demoted or devalued, as happened to the former planet Pluto).
2007	subprime	(an adjective used to describe a risky or less than ideal loan, mortgage, or investment).
2008	bailout	(a rescue by government of a failing corporation)
2009	tweet	(a short message sent via the Twitter service)
2010	app	
2011	occupy	(in reference to the Occupy movement)
2012	#hashtag	
2013	because	(introducing a noun, adjective, or other part of speech: "because reasons," "because awesome")
2014	#blacklivesmatter	
2015	they	("gender-neutral singular pronoun for a known person, particularly as a nonbinary identifier")
2016	dumpster fire	an exceedingly disastrous or chaotic situation
2017	fake news	defined by the ADS in two ways: "disinformation or falsehoods presented as real news" and "actual news that is claimed to be untrue"
2018	tender-age shelter	("government-run detention centers that have housed the children of asylum seekers at the U.S./Mexico border")
2019	(my) pronouns	"Recognized for its use as an introduction for sharing one's set of personal pronouns (as in 'pronouns: she/her')."
2020	Covid	
2021	Insurrection	referring to the January 6 United States Capitol attack.
2022	-ussy	(suffix from pussy)
2023	enshittification	
2024	rawdog	"Defined as 'to undertake without usual protection, preparation, or comfort,'" a generalization of the earlier meaning, 'to have sex without a condom'."
2025	slop	"Recognized for its widespread use for low-quality, high-quantity content, most typically produced by generative AI."

== See also ==
- American English
- Language planning
- Language Report from Oxford University Press
- Lists of Merriam-Webster's Words of the Year
- Neologism
- Word formation
