= Word of the year (Portugal) =

Annual poll in Portugal

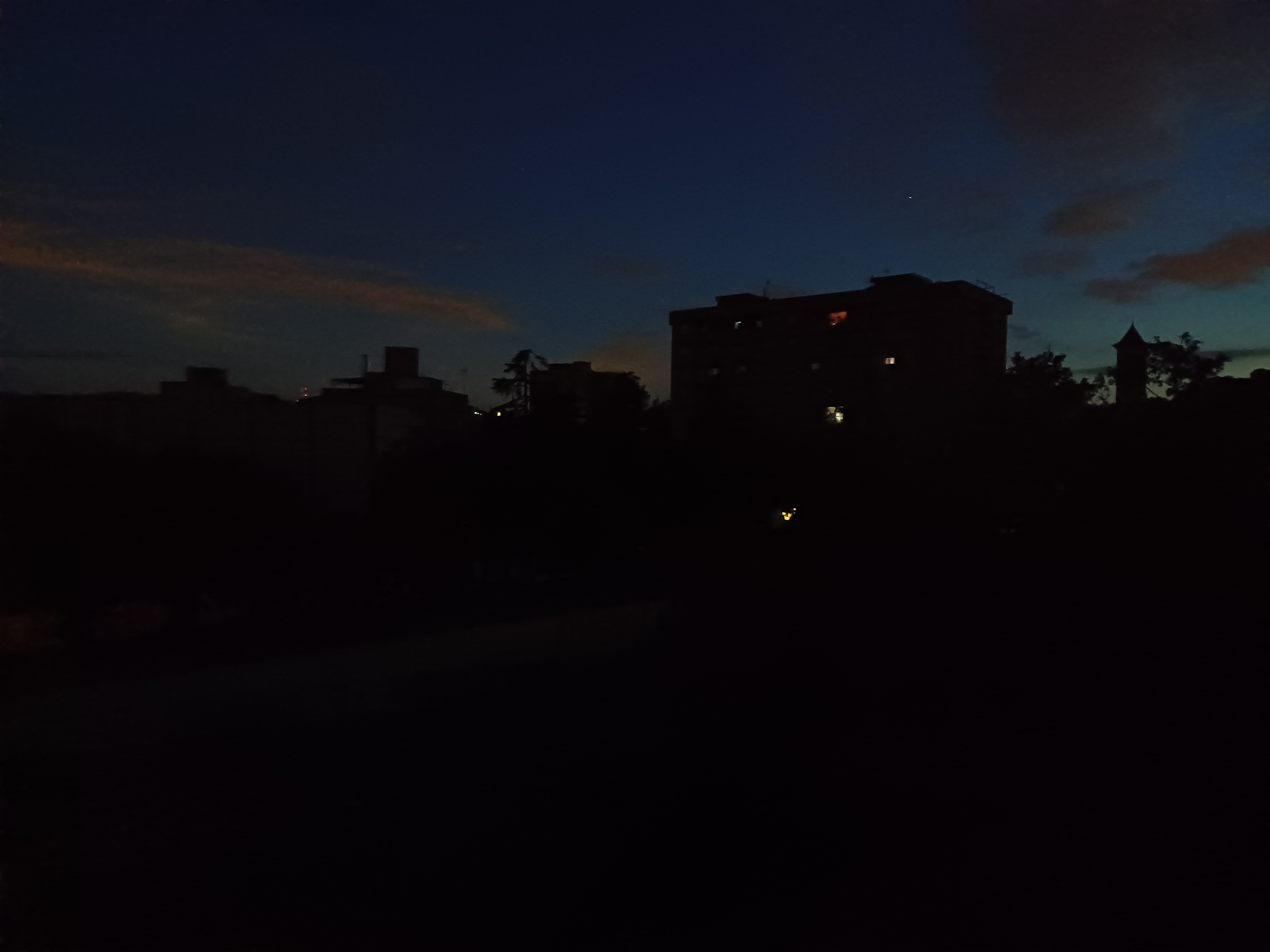
"Apagão" (blackout) was Portugal's Word of the Year in 2025

In Portugal, the Word of the Year (Portuguese: Palavra do Ano) poll has been carried out since 2009 by the Porto Editora publishing house.

== Background and methodology ==
Porto Editora started the Word of the Year poll to "underscore the lexical wealth and creative dynamics of the Portuguese Language". The list of candidates is produced by the publishing house through the analysis of the frequence of the usage of words (judged by both its use in mass and social media, as well as searches in Porto Editora online dictionaries), their relevance to the current goings-on, and people's suggestions on the Word of the Year website.

Until the end of November of each year, people are invited to submit their suggestions; the final vote takes place during the month of December. The Word of the Year is announced in a public ceremony in early January of the following year.

== List of Words of the Year ==
Year	Word of the Year (Portugal)	English translation	Explanation
2009	esmiuçar	to explain in detail; to scrutinise	Word popularised by comedy television show Gato Fedorento Esmiúça Os Sufrágios ("Gato Fedorento Scrutinize the Suffrage"), spoofing the electoral campaign for that year's legislative election.
2010	vuvuzela	vuvuzela	Popularised during the 2010 FIFA World Cup, its ubiquity (and disruption) led to it being the subject of much controversy with many proposals to limit its use during matches.
2011	austeridade	austerity	In the context of sovereign default, Prime Minister José Sócrates handed in his resignation when Parliament rejected his government's austerity measures; when Leader of the Opposition Pedro Passos Coelho was elected Prime Minister he went on to adopt an even stricter austerity policy.
2012	entroikado	Troika-ed	Economic disruption in the wake of the early-2010s financial crisis led the country to negotiate a loan to help stabilise its public finances in 2011: the measures imposed by the loan organising committee (the European Commission, the European Central Bank, and the International Monetary Fund; commonly referred to as "the Troika") led to a prominent rise in the unemployment rate.
2013	bombeiro	firefighter	The second half of August 2013 was marked by devastating wildfires that caused nine deaths and resulted in a total of approximately 145,000 hectares (360,000 acres) of burned land — the worst fires in eight years.
2014	corrupção	corruption	Two high-profile political corruption scandals made headlines in 2014: the Face Oculta affair (a money-laundering network which included, among others, former Minister Armando Vara), and the Labirinto affair (in which the Portugal Golden Visa programme was linked to international corruption networks). Later on, former Prime Minister José Sócrates was arrested in Lisbon, accused of corruption, tax evasion, and money laundering.
2015	refugiado	refugee	The armed conflicts in Middle East countries such as Syria, Afghanistan, Iraq and Eritrea created a great influx of refugees fleeing war and persecution into the Schengen Area: the European Union struggled to cope with the crisis.
2016	geringonça	contraption	Following the 2015 legislative election, the Socialist Party formed a minority government based on a then-unheard-of confidence-and-supply agreement with the left-wing parties (Left Bloc, Portuguese Communist Party, and Ecologist Party "The Greens"). After People's Party leader Paulo Portas remarked in Parliament "this is not quite a government, it's more of a contraption", the term caught on, and soon was being used to refer to the government by both detractors and supporters.
2017	incêndios	wildfires	The successive wildfires in June and in October resulted in 111 deaths, 300 hurt, entire communities suffering from post-traumatic stress disorder, and over 520 thousand hectares (1,300 thousand acres) of burned forest — over half of the burned area in the whole of Europe that year. The government declared three national days of mourning on the two separate occasions.
2018	enfermeiro	nurse	The year 2018 saw nurses organising well-attended protests and picket lines in several cities across the country, demanding an increase in wages, an end to the long-enforced pay cap, and the hiring of more nurses.
2019	violência [doméstica]	[domestic] violence	A total of 35 people (27 women, 7 men, and 1 child) were killed in Portugal in 2019 in the context of domestic violence. In response to the mounting tally of deaths recorded by police, the cabinet decreed a national day of mourning on 7 March, one day before International Women's Day, to honour the victims and raise awareness. Several activists took to the streets protesting against lenient judgments against attackers, especially after the appellate judge Neto de Moura's polemic ruling downplaying a case of physical abuse against a woman due to the fact the woman in question had committed adultery.
2020	saudade	wistfulness	2020 was heavily defined by the COVID-19 pandemic, which led to significant social and economic disruption worldwide. The necessary social distancing measures to reduce the spread of the virus meant many restrictions were put in place throughout the year, such as curfews, quarantines, cordons sanitaires, and generalised stay-at-home orders, preventing many gatherings and social interactions from taking place. As the year ended, nearly 7000 deaths had been attributed to COVID-19 in the country.
2021	vacina	vaccine	COVID-19 vaccines, developed in record time, became a major weapon against the pandemic, bringing in a marked reduction in the number of hospitalisations and deaths due to severe illness which allowed for the subsequent easing of social restrictions that the population was subject to, to curb the spread of the disease. The national vaccination campaign was seen as a great success, with vaccination rates in Portugal being the world's highest.
2022	guerra	war	The Russian invasion of Ukraine in February 2022 gave start to the largest military conflict in Europe since the end of the Second World War; the resulting humanitarian and economic crises, with the compression of the energy and raw materials markets, extended its impact to the whole world.
2023	professor	teacher	Throughout the year 2023, schoolteachers organised several strikes and demonstrations demanding solutions to problems related to their career progression, working conditions and salaries.
2024	liberdade	liberty	The word alludes to the semicentennial commemorations of the Carnation Revolution, widely observed by the Portuguese in April 2024.
2025	apagão	blackout	A major event, the power outage on 28 April 2025, when electric power was interrupted for about ten hours in Portugal and neighbouring Spain, caused severe difficulties in telecommunications, transportation systems, and essential sectors such as emergency services.
