= Insurrection (disambiguation) =

Insurrection a form of rebellion, an armed uprising.

Insurrection may also refer to:

== Art, entertainment, and media ==
=== Films and television ===
- Insurrection (TV series), a 1966 docudrama broadcast on Telefís Éireann
- Star Trek: Insurrection, a 1998 Star Trek film

=== Literature ===
- Insurrection (O'Flaherty novel), a 1950 novel by the Irish novelist Liam O'Flaherty
- Insurrection (Forgotten Realms novel), a 2002 fantasy novel set in the Forgotten Realms universe
- Insurrection (Young novel), the first novel in Robyn Young's Insurrection trilogy
- Insurrection, a 1990 science fiction novel by David Weber and Steve White; part of the Starfire series
- The Coming Insurrection, a 2008 anti-capitalist book written by the left-of-center Invisible Committee

=== Music ===
- Insurrection (album), a 2011 album by Molotov Solution
- Live Insurrection, a 2001 live album by heavy metal band Halford
- "Insurrection", a song from German band Gamma Ray's album Land of the Free II

=== Other art, entertainment, and media ===
- StarCraft: Insurrection, an expansion for the Blizzard game StarCraft
- WWE Insurrextion, a World Wrestling Entertainment pay-per-view event

== History ==
- Siege of Malta (1798–1800), also known as the Maltese Insurrection
- 1971 JVP insurrection, a Sri Lankan war initiated by the Janatha Vimukthi Peramuna ("People's Liberation Front")
- 1987–1989 JVP insurrection, a continuation of the 1971 JVP Insurrection
- Philippine Insurrection or the Philippine–American War (1899–1902)
- January 6 United States Capitol attack, instigated by Donald Trump (2021)
- 2024 South Korean martial law crisis, instigated by Yoon Suk Yeol

== Philosophy ==
- Insurrectionary anarchism, a political derivative of anarchism
