= Dumpster fire =

American slang term used to describe a disastrous incident

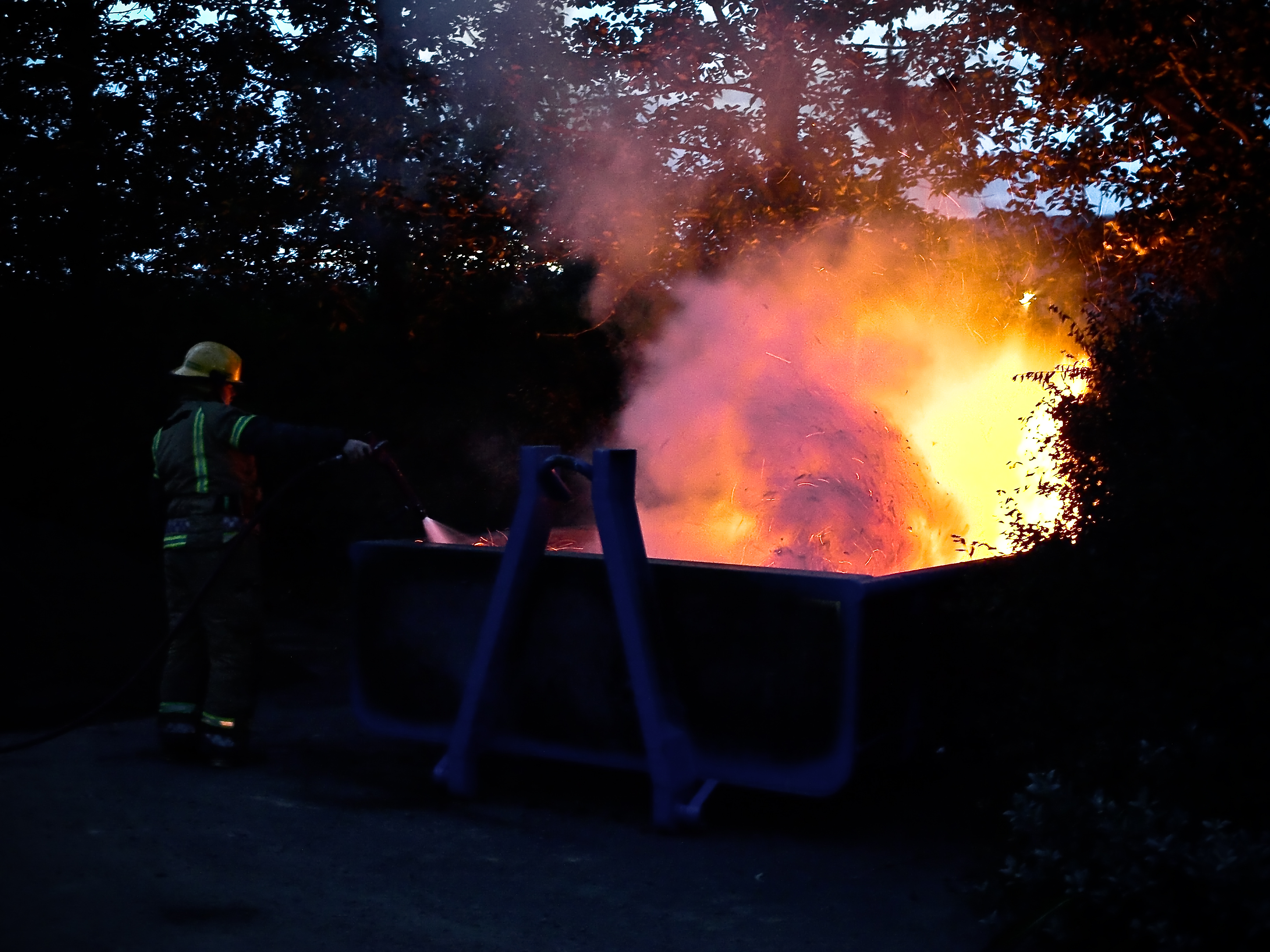
The term "dumpster fire" is derived from fires that start in large exterior trash bins, referred to in the United States as "dumpsters".

Dumpster fire is an informal term used to describe a catastrophically bad situation for an entity, to the point of being unsalvageable. It has appeared in metaphorical form as early as 2003, and picked up traction in 2010 in the world of sports. The term was heavily used in 2016 to describe the United States presidential election that year.

== Etymology ==
Dumpster fire derives from fires that start in large trash bins. These bins are often termed "dumpsters" after the Dempster Dumpster brand of trash bin in the United States, which eventually came to be colloquialized as "dumpster".

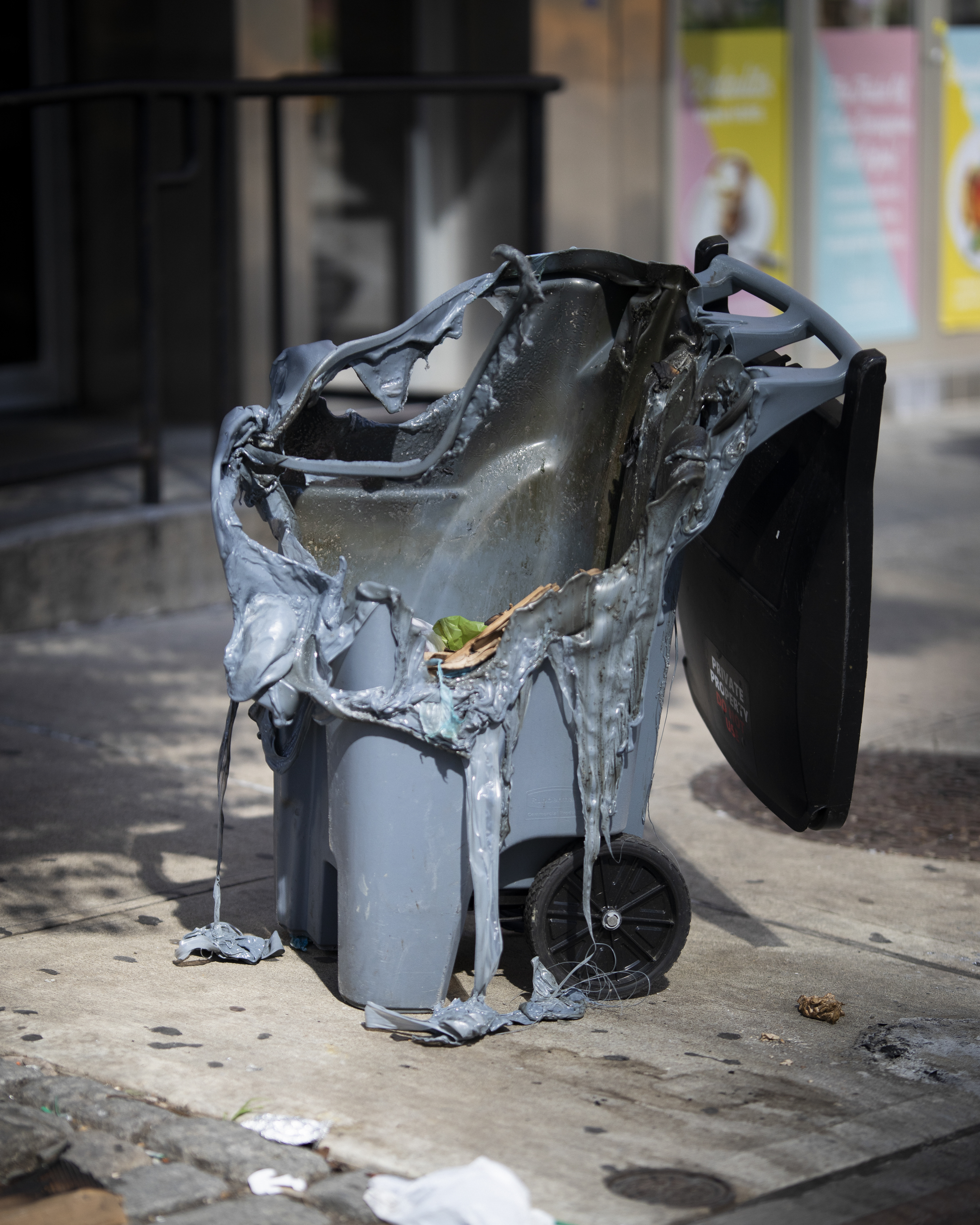
The aftermath of a fire in a trash bin

== History ==
The earliest known use of the term dates back to a 2003 review of a remake of The Texas Chainsaw Massacre, in which The Arizona Republic's Bill Muller said that the film was "the cinematic equivalent of a dumpster fire – stinky but insignificant". Urban Dictionary added a definition for the term as early as 2008, with one entry listing it as "a laughably poor performance." Usage of "dumpster fire" remained relatively obscure throughout the early 2010s, but gained widespread usage starting in 2010 in the world of American sports, where teams that performed exceptionally poorly would be labelled with the term in news, social media, and talk radio.

In late 2015 the term shifted towards the realm of politics, and particularly the 2016 United States presidential election. The Daily Beast suggested that it was linked to Republican Party candidate Donald Trump, with Google searches for the word spiking when he announced his presidential run in October 2015. That year, dumpster fire—as well as the two emoji that represent the individual words, "🗑️🔥"—was announced to be the American Dialect Society's word of the year, beating out "woke" in a run-off election. The president of the vote, sociolinguist Ben Zimmer, reasoned that people used the word to describe the unpleasant year in a "colorful, evocative" way, adding that it was a term suited for "pessimistic times".

In March 2018, dumpster fire was added to the Merriam-Webster dictionary, defined as "an utterly calamitous or mismanaged situation or occurrence".

== Analysis ==
Claire Fallon with HuffPost comments that the term might derive part of its goofiness from the consonants in "dumpster", arguing that the three plosive consonants in just two syllables might be naturally funny in a similar manner to the made-up words of Dr. Seuss. Fallon also comments that the phrase is both "too grandiose and too unserious for common parlance", pointing out that one would refer to neither the Middle East nor a colleague as a dumpster fire, but for different reasons.

After the word was added to the Merriam-Webster dictionary, National Public Radio commented that the word was more of the "I know it when I see it" variety, but said that the metaphor was also a "phrase for our time" they "wouldn't want to live without". CNN also commented that the term showed relevance to the present day, highlighting the Stormy Daniels–Donald Trump scandal, explosive cyclogenesis, and the 2018 NFL draft.

Several journalists who responded to the questions in Erin Gloria Ryan's oral history of the term in The Daily Beast expected or hoped that the term would go out of fashion, arguing that it was overused during the election cycle.
