= Word of the year (Russia) =

Russian poll

In Russia, the Word of the Year (Russian: Слово года) poll has been carried out since 2007 by the Expert Council of the Centre for Creative Development of the Russian Language headed by Russian-American philologist Mikhail Epstein.

== 2015 ==
In December 2015, Epstein reported in his blog "Snob" the following results.

- Word of the year: БЕЖЕНЦЫ (Refugees), in reference to the refugee from Middle East.
- Phrase of the year:: НЕМЦОВ МОСТ (Nemtsov's Bridge), a suggestion to rename the bridge where Russian opposition leader Boris Nemtsov was assassinated.
- Anti-language: ОБАМА - ЧМО (Obama chmo, "Obama is a schmuck")
- Neololgism: БЕССМЕРТНЫЙ БАРАК (Immortal Barrack, by Андрей Десницкий). The term was coined in an analogy to the "Immortal Regiment". The latter was an annual action to commemorate the nameless heroes perished in Great Partiotic War. The "Immortal Barrack" action was suggested to commemorate the perished in Stalinist Gulag labor camps.

== 2016 ==
In December 2016, Epstein reported in his blog "Snob" the following results.

- Word of the year: БРЕКСИТ (BREXIT), in reference to Brexit.
- Phrase of the year:: ОЧЕРЕДЬ НА СЕРОВА/АЙВАЗОВСКОГО (Queue to Serov and Aivazovsky exhibitions, famous Russian artists of the 19th c.; there were huge queues to their exhibitions at Moscow Tretiakov gallery).
- Anti-language: "Денег нет, но вы держитесь" (“There is no money for you, but you should stand firm" (Dmitry Medvedev's response to someone complaining about pensions in Crimea))
- Neololgism: 1.ЗЛОВЦО (Evil word). 2.НЕУЕЗЖАНТ Non–leaver – the one who has the opportunity to emigrate but prefers to stay in Russia.

== 2017 ==
In December 2017, Epstein reported in his blog "Snob" the following results.

- Word of the year: РЕНОВАЦИЯ (renovation), in reference to the program on new housing in Moscow.
- Phrase of the year:: ОН ВАМ НЕ ДИМОН (He Is Not Dimon to You, in reference to the title of A. Navalny's film on Dmitriy (Dimon) Medvedev)
- Anti-language: Иностранный агент (Foreign agent)
- Neololgism: 1.ГОП-ПОЛИТИКА, ГОП-ЖУРНАЛИСТИКА, ГОП-РЕЛИГИЯ (hoo–politics, hoo–journalism, hoo–religion, from Russian "gop-", "gopota" referring to "hoodlum" and "hooliganism" in various aspects of social life). 2. ДОМОГАНТ (harasser, in reference to sex–scandals in the USA)

== 2022 ==
The choice was performed by an independent expert council headed by philologist and culturologist Mikhail Epstein.

- Word of the year: «война» (war)
- Phrase of the year: СВО (специальная военная операция) (special military operation), a euphemism for the Russian invasion of Ukraine; same choice as for the American Dialect Society's Words of the Year 2022.
- Anti-language: «дискредитация армии» (discreditation of the army)

== 2023 ==
- Word of the year:
  - Epstein's poll: искусственный интеллект
  - Pushkin State Russian Language Institute poll: нейросеть

== 2024 ==
- Word of the year:
  - Epstein's poll: Navalny
  - gramota.ru poll of experts: Вайб, in the meaning of "emotional state or feeling produced by something or someone". It is a productive word in Russian, generating an adjective, a verb, etc.

== Previous years ==
- 2007 — гламур ("glamour")
- 2008 — кризис ("crisis", Great Recession)
- 2009 — перезагрузка ("reset", Russian reset)
- 2010 — огнеборцы ("firefighters", 2010 Russian wildfires)
- 2011 — полиция ("police")
- 2012 — Болотная (Bolotnaya Square)
- 2013 — госдура (Gosdura, a pun with Gosduma, a Russian acronym for State Duma, dura is the feminine for durak, "fool")
- 2014 — крымнаш (Krymnash, a contraction of "Крым наш", "Crimea is Ours")
- 2015 — беженцы ("refugees", European migrant crisis)
- 2016 — Брексит ("Brexit")
- 2017 — реновация (program of renovation of housing in Moscow)
- 2018 — Новичок ("Novichok" )
