= W00t =

Slang interjection

The term w00t (spelled with double-zero, "00"), or woot, is a slang interjection used to express happiness or excitement, usually used in online conversation. The expression is most popular on forums, Usenet posts, multiplayer computer games (especially first-person shooters), IRC chats, and instant messages, though use in webpages of the World Wide Web is by no means uncommon. The w00t spelling (with double-zero "00") is a leetspeak variant of woot; alternative spellings include whoot, wOOt, wh00t, wewt, wought, etc.

== Etymology ==
See the Wiktionary article w00t for details of etymology and citations; while origins are never certain, the below is supported by contemporary written references, and is credited by American lexicographer Grant Barrett.

The term woot was recalled by a Canadian in the early 2000s to have been used in the 80s and 90s on an RPG BBS as a contraction of "what a hoot".

w00t (1996) is a leetspeak form of earlier whoot (1993), which in turn was popularized by the rap song "Whoot, There It Is" (single released March 22, 1993) by group 95 South; this is often confused with "Whoomp! (There It Is)" (single released May 7, 1993) by group Tag Team. Both these songs are in the same year, in the Miami bass genre. The terms whoot and whoomp (and the less common form “Whoops, there it is”) are standardizations of earlier oral use of hooting sounds variously rendered as whoo, whoof, woo, woof (compare standard woohoo), notably by studio audience on The Arsenio Hall Show (1989–94) and in the movie Pretty Woman (1990). The use by the "dog pound" section of The Arsenio Hall Show audience was based on a dog’s woof, from chants used by football fans of the Cleveland Browns in Hall’s home town.

Many folk etymologies exist, but the written record is clear: the term appears widely in popular print use only from 1993, particularly used both in dancehalls and at sporting events, and is credited to the songs. The "w00t" form gained popularity on the Internet from 1996, especially in massively multiplayer online role-playing games (MMORPGs) like RuneScape.

=== Folk etymologies ===
Many folk etymologies and backronyms exist, none supported by the written record: these often credit the term to games that appeared years after whoot had been popularized (1993) or w00t has appeared in common Internet usage (1996).

One such incorrect etymology derives w00t as a contraction of a phrase like "wow, loot!", "woo, loot!", "wondrous loot", and "Wonderful Loot", etc. in a MMORPG when a player found large quantities of/or rare valuable items in game, or as an acronym for "we owned the other team". These games appeared after w00t was already common. Another supposed origin is as an expression used by a cracker (see security cracking) who has just broken into a computer system, obtaining "root" access: "woot, I have root!". Some people say it was just a parody on a child with a speech defect trying to say "loot" and saying "woot" instead.

Other etymologies relate it to "hoot" or "toot", as in trains in children's books, that went "Woot! Woot!", doing so as a statement of victory, or applauding good news. (Some people today say "Woot! Woot!" while making the hand-gesture of pulling a train's horn cord.) Alternatively, attempts are made to relate it to the Scots word "hoots", which is used in a somewhat similar manner — an exclamation signifying surprise, disbelief, or kindred reaction, though not for positive feelings (delight, joy) as w00t is. This is also along the lines of people's use of "w00t?", replacing "wot?" or "what?" as a response to a happy surprise.

== In popular culture ==
The word was featured on the list of Merriam-Webster's Words of the Year for 2007. They said, it "reflects a new direction in the American language led by a generation raised on video games and cell phone text-messaging".

Apart from the British digital sales house w00t!media the expression also made it into a URL-shortener. Garaj Mahal named their 2008 album w00t.

In 2011, "woot" was added to the Concise Oxford English Dictionary. The word is officially recognized in the dictionary without zeroes, and is instead spelled with two Os.
