= List of Washington Journal programs aired in April 1995 =

The C-SPAN news and interview program Washington Journal has been presented live every day of the year from January 4, 1995, through the present, with very few exceptions. Programs are typically a mix of politically themed interviews, viewer calls and emails, discussion of current events, and reviews of that morning's newspapers.

In the table below, guests are listed in alphabetical order, rather than the order in which they appeared on the program. They are also listed with the position or affiliation they held at the time of their appearance.

== Table of programs ==
| Date (w/link to video) | Approx. run time | Host(s) | Guests | Comments and summary |
|---|---|---|---|---|
| Saturday, April 01, 1995 | 1 hr. 26 min. | Lew Ketcham | Edward W. Gillespie (Press Secretary to Rep. Richard Armey (R-TX)); Alfred Lott (Representative, World War II Commemoration Committee); Kiki Moore (Political Consultant, Dewey Square Group); James Popkin (Senior Editor, U.S. News & World Report) | "Via remote link, Lt. Col. Lott discussed the 50th Anniversary of U.S. invasion of Okinawa, April 1, 1945. In the newspaper roundtable, Ms. Moore, Mr. Gillespie and via telephone Mr. Popkin discussed headlines from various papers across the country." |
| Sunday, April 02, 1995 | 2 hr. 2 min. | | Lloyd Cutler (Former White House Counsel); Former Gov. Pete DuPont (R-DE); Joan Lowy (Congressional Correspondent, Scripps Howard News Service); Stephen "Steve" Moore (Senior Fellow, Cato Institute) | "Ms. Salmon previewed the legislation the 104th Congress will be considering this week, including the Republican tax bill. In the newspaper roundtable, Mr. Cutler and Mr. DuPont discussed the top news stories in the Sunday newspapers. Mr. Moore explained his article which recommends doing away with the income tax." |
| Monday, April 03, 1995 | 2 hr. 40 min. | Brian Lamb | Anita Blair (Correspondent, Women's Quarterly); Guy Gugliotta (Correspondent, Washington Post); David Keating (President, National Taxpayers Union); Jurek Martin (Editor, Financial Times); Robert McIntyre (Director, Citizens for Tax Justice); Clarence Page (Columnist, Chicago Tribune) | "Mr. Gugliotta and Mr. Martin reviewed the morning newspapers and answered questions from callers. Mr. Gugliotta discussed the final few days of the 100-day Republican Contract with America. Mr. Martin previewed British Prime Minister Major's trip to the U.S. In the point-counterpoint segment, the guests debated the Republican tax cuts legislation. In the newspaper roundtable, Ms. Blair and Mr. Page reviewed the top stories in the morning newspapers. In the point-counterpoint segment, Mr. Keating and Mr. McIntyre offered their thoughts on the Republican tax cut plan, which the House debates this week. In the last segment, Rep. Davis, the chairman of the District of Columbia subcommittee, discussed a bill which will establish a financial control board for the district." |
| Tuesday, April 04, 1995 | 2 hr. 29 min. | Susan Swain | Kerry Knott (Chief of Staff, Office of Rep. Richard Armey (R-TX)); Frank I. Luntz (Political Consultant, Luntz and Associates); T. R. Reid (North Asia Correspondent, Washington Post); Andrew "Andy" Taylor (Correspondent, Congressional Quarterly); Robert B. Zoellick (Former Undersecretary of State for Economic Affairs) | "In the first segment Mr. Taylor talked about the Balanced Budget Amendment and Line-Item Veto portions of the Republican Contract with American and previewed the congressional debate on the GOP tax cut plan. In the newspaper roundtable segment, Mr. Reid and Mr. Zoellick commented on the morning’s headline stories from around the U.S. Mr. Luntz and Mr. Knott discussed helping develop and write the provisions of the Republican Contract with America and talking with candidates and members of Congress about it." |
| Wednesday, April 05, 1995 | 3 hr. 6 min. | Bruce Collins | Jennifer Allen (Officer, People for Ethical Treatment of Animals); Harvey Berkman (Correspondent, National Law Journal); Rep. Glen Browder (D-AL); Margaret Camp (Press Secretary, Office of Sen. Arlen Specter R-PA); James "Jay" Carney (White House Correspondent, Time Magazine); Rep. Gene Green (R-TX); Former Rep. Andrew "Andy" Ireland (R-FL); Rep. Bill Martini (R-NJ); Nancy Mathis (Correspondent, Houston Chronicle); David Skidmore (Correspondent, Associated Press); Rep. Richard "Dick" Zimmer (R-NJ) | "Mr. Carney discussed the White House response to proposed Republican tax cut legislation and previewed today’s debate on taxes and the deficit. Reps. Green and Martini participated in the newspaper roundtable segment. In the point-counterpoint segment, Reps. Browder and Zimmer debated the Republican tax cut proposal currently before the House. In the last segment, former Congressman Ireland, now a vice president at Ringling Brothers, described setting up a one-ring circus in front of the Capitol this morning. Ms. Allen discussed why PETA is protesting the circus' treatment of animals." |
| Thursday, April 06, 1995 | 3 hr. | Lew Ketcham; Steve Scully | Robert "Bob" L. Borosage (Professor, Institute for Policy Studies); Sen. Howell T. Heflin (D-AL); Karen Hosler (Congressional Correspondent, Baltimore Sun); Don Imus (Talk Show Host, WFAN-AM); Sen. James M. Inhofe (R-OK); Mary King (Teacher, Fort Chiswell High School, Max Meadows, VA); Richard Sammon (Correspondent,CQ Daily Monitor); Tom Schatz (President, Citizens Against Government Waste); Paul Starr (co-founder and Co-Editor, The American Prospect); George Stephanopoulos (White House Communications Director) | "Topics focused on the first 100 days of the 104th Congress. Ms. Hosler reviewed last night’s debate on the Republican tax proposal in the House. Mr. Imus discussed some comments made by Senator Alfonse D'Amato on Mr. Imus's radio show. In the newspaper roundtable, Sen. Heflin and Inhofe discussed the top stories in the morning newspapers, including the Republican “Contract With America” and the 1996 presidential campaign. In the point-counterpoint segment, Mr. Schatz and Mr. Borosage reviewed the first 100 days of the 104th Congress and the Republican “Contract With America.” Mr. Sammon also reviewed the first 100 days of the 104th Congress and the Republican “Contract With America.” Via remote from the White House lawn, Mr. Stephanopoulos gave the Clinton administration's views on the first 100 days of Congress and the “Contract With America.” In the final segment, Mr. Starr previewed the issues which the Congress and the administration will be faced with in the future. " |
| Friday, April 07, 1995 | 2 hr. 53 min. | Brian Lamb | Rep. John Boehner (R-OH); Rep. Steve "Stephen" Buyer (R-IN); Jacqueline "Jackie" Calmes (Correspondent, Wall Street Journal); Rep. James "Jim" C. Greenwood (R-PA); Rep. Jane Harman (D-CA); Jessica Lee (Correspondent, USA Today); Carl P. Leubsdorf (Washington Bureau Chief, Dallas Morning News); Rep. John Lewis (D-GA); Rep. Frank A. LoBiondo (R-NJ); Carolyn Lochhead (Correspondent, San Francisco Chronicle); David Smith (Chief Washington Bureau Correspondent, Independent Television News); Barry Tron (Producer); Rep. Maxine Waters (D-CA) | "In the opening segment, Mr. Luebsdorf talked about current headlines and his interview with President Clinton yesterday. Mr. Tron talked about the upcoming Republican celebration marking the end of the first 100 days. In the newspaper roundtable, Ms. Lochhead and Ms. Lee examined stories from around the nation. Ms. Calmes talked about the future of the House tax cut bill. In a live remote interview, Rep. Boehner talked about the future of the Republican “Contract with America.” Several members reviewed the first 100 days in taped interviews from yesterday. Mr. Smith talked about his trip to Muncie, Indiana to hear what middle Americans are saying about the Republican “Contract with America.” F.C.C. Chairman Hunt talked about the agency's role in regulating communications for all Americans. In the last segment, Senator Dodd talked about the status of the Republican “Contract with America.” " |
| Saturday, April 08, 1995 | 1 hr. 30 min. | Lew Ketcham | Harold Brazil (Member, District of Columbia City Council); Robert A. George (Legislative Assistant, Office of Rep. Michael Huffington (R-CA)); David Seldin (Former White House Aide); Arthur B. Spitzer (Representative, American Civil Liberties Union); Jill Zuckman (Correspondent, Boston Globe) | "In the first segment, Ms. Zuckman talked about Speaker Gingrich's address to the nation and other issues. In the taped point-counterpoint segment, Mr. Spitzer and Mr. Brazil debated the necessity and legality of juvenile curfews. In the newspaper roundatble, Mr. George and Mr. Seldin examined news stories from around the nation." |
| Sunday, April 09, 1995 | 1 hr. 56 min. | Steve Scully | Doris Kearns Goodwin (Historian); John King (Correspondent, Associated Press); Thomas W. Lippman (Correspondent; Washington Post); James C. Miller III (chairman of the Board of Directors, Citizens for a Sound Economy); Hugh Price (President and CEO, National Urban League) | "In the opening segment, Mr. King talked about the race for the Republican nomination and other issues. In the newspaper roundtable, Mr. Miller and Mr. King discussed a variety of topics including deficit reduction, the possibility of a third party candidate in 1996, and the first 100 days of the 104th Congress. In a telephone interview, Mr. Lippman talked about Robert McNamara's book about his views on the Vietnam War. In the last segment, Ms. Goodwin talked about the life and death of President Franklin Roosevelt on April 12, 1945. " |
| Monday, April 10, 1995 | 3 hr. 16 min. | Brian Lamb | Richard Benedetto (White House Correspondent, USA Today); Virgil Dean (Historian, Kansas State Historical Society); Lew Ferguson (Correspondent, Associated Press); William "Bill" B. Lacy (Political Consultant, G.W. Bush Presidential Campaign, California); Lars-Erik Nelson (Columnist, Newsday); Todd S. Purdum (Correspondent, New York Times); Tim Russert (Washington Bureau Chief, NBC Television); Gerald F. Seib (National Politics Correspondent, Wall Street Journal); Jake Thompson; R. "Bob" Emmett Tyrrell Jr. (Founder and Editor-in-Chief, American Spectator); Majorie Williams (Correspondent, Vanity Fair); Ira Wyman (Photographer, Newsweek) | "Mr. Russert discussed how NBC is coordinating its coverage of the 1996 presidential race. In the newspaper roundtable, Mr. Tyrell and Mr. Nelson discussed headlines from various papers across the country. Via telephone, Ms. Williams talked about her article in Vanity Fair. Via telephone, Mr. Benedetto talked about his article in USA Today. Mr. Purdum, and via remote link, Mr. Wyman discussed what it is like to go on a trip with the first lady and Chelsea. They also discussed the pictures taken by Mr. Wyman. Via remote link, Mr. Dean talked about Kansas politics and Senator Dole's role in the state Republican party. Via remote link, Mr. Lacy discussed what the themes and issues of the Dole campaign will be. Via remote link, Mr. Thompson talked about his book Bob Dole: The Republican's Man For All Seasons. Via remote link, Mr. Seib talked about Senator Dole. Via remote link, Mr. Ferguson talked about Senator Dole." |
| Tuesday, April 11, 1995 | 2 hr. 7 min. | Susan Swain | Rep. Nathan Deal (R-GA); Steve "Malcolm" Forbes (Editor, Forbes Magazine); Wendy Kaminer; John McQuaid (Washington, D.C. Correspondent New Orleans Times-Picayune) Richard Noyes (Election Assessment Director, Center for Media and Public Affairs); Jacob Weisberg (Correspondent, New York Magazine) | "Via telephone, Mr. McQuaid discussed Rep. Nathan Deal’s switch to the Republican party and what this means to the Democratic party as a whole. He also talked about the conservative Democrats' caucus, the Coalition, and their new PAC, known as the “Blue Dog” PAC. In the newspaper roundtable, Mr. Weisberg and Ms. Kaminer discussed headlines from various papers across the country. Via telephone, Mr. Deal talked about his switch to the Republican party. Via telephone, Mr. Noyes talked about media coverage of the 104th Congress and the president. Mr. Forbes discussed politics and fiscal issues." |
| Wednesday, April 12, 1995 | 2 hr. 31 min. | Bruce Collins | Dorann Gunderson (Director, Franklin Roosevelt Memorial Commission); Allan J. Lichtman (History Professor, American University); Stephen "Steve" Moore (Senior Fellow, Cato Institute); Robert Nathan (White House Official, Franklin Roosevelt Administration); John O'Donnell (Correspondent, Baltimore Sun); Former Rep. Stephen J. Solarz (D-NY); Former Sen. Malcolm Wallop (R-WY) | "Mr. O’Donnell discussed recent changes in the Social Security Administration. In the newspaper roundtable, Former Senator Wallop and Former Rep. Solarz discussed headlines from various papers across the country. In a point counterpoint discussion, Mr. Lichtman and Mr. Moore discussed President Roosevelt’s New Deal programs. Mr. Nathan talked about President Roosevelt. Ms. Gunderson talked about the FDR Memorial Commission." |
| Thursday, April 13, 1995 | 3 hr. 1 min. | Lew Ketcham; Susan Swain | David Bradt Jr. (Partner, Arthur Andersen and Company); Michael A. Carvin (Attorney); Mark Dornan; Rep. Robert "Bob" K. Dornan (R-CA); Terry Eastland (Executive Editor, Forbes MediaCritic); Juliet Eilperin (Correspondent, CQ Today); Joe Klein (Senior Editor, Newsweek); Fernando Murias (Partner, Coopers and Lybrand); Sean Piccoli (Correspondent, Washington Times); Anthony Robinson (President, Minority Business Legal Defense and Education Fund); Elaine Shannon (Correspondent, Time Magazine) | "Ms. Shannon talked about the recent death of an American woman in Israel and the imprisonment of two U.S. citizens in Iraq. In the newspaper roundtable, Mr. Klein and Mr. Eastland discussed headlines from various papers across the country. Via telephone, Ms. Eilperin talked about her article in Roll Call about the Republican reform drive in the House. Via telephone, Mr. Piccoli talked about his article in Washington Times about unauthorized biographies of Newt Gingrich. In a point-counterpoint discussion, Mr. Carvin and Mr. Robinson discussed minority business set-asides. Rep. Dornan and his son talked about his presidential candidacy. Mr. Bradt and Mr. Murias answered viewers' questions about tax returns. " |
| Friday, April 14, 1995 | 3 hr. | Brian Lamb | Pat Crowley (Editorial Cartoonist, The Hill); Jason DeParle (Correspondent, New York Times); Sheldon Friedman (Economic Research Director, AFL-CIO); Harold Holzer (Former Editor, Lincoln Douglas Debates); Ellen Ladowsky (Politics Writer); Alvin Rabushka (Senior Fellow, Hoover Institution at Stanford University); Marshall Reese (Artist); Don Rush (Washington Bureau Chief, Pacifica Radio); Harry Schwartz (Writer, The Hill); Russell Townsley (Former Publisher, Russell Daily News, Russell, KS) | "In the first segment, Mr. Holzer talked about the assassination of President Lincoln on the 130th anniversary of the event. In the newspaper roundtable, Mr. Rush and Ms. Ladowsky discussed headlines from various papers across the country. Mr. DeParle talked about his story about Ted Welch, Lamar Alexander's principal fundraiser. In the point-counterpoint, Mr. Rabushka and Mr. Friedman debated the merits of a flat tax rate. Mr. Reese talked about his “Contract with America” underwear. In the last segment, Mr. Schwartz and Mr. Crowley talked about their cartoon depicting the new television coverage of the House." |
| Saturday, April 15, 1995 | 1 hr. 30 min. | Lew Ketcham | Jamie Dettmer (Correspondent, Insight Magazine); Thomas "Tom" W. Pauken (Chairman, Texas Republican Party); Jeffrey Rosen (Correspondent, The New Republic) | "Mr. Pauken talked about the political implications of the Vietnam war. In the newspaper roundtable, Mr. Dettmer and Mr. Rosen discussed headlines from various papers across the country." |
| Sunday, April 16, 1995 | 2 hr. | Steve Scully | Paul M. Barrett (Supreme Court Correspondent, Wall Street Journal); Michael Isikoff (Correspondent, Newsweek); Nicholas Sabatine (chairman, Patriot Party); Paul Tsongas (co-founder, Concord Coalition); Perry Willis (Director, Libertarian Party) | "Mr. Barrett talked about the Endangered Species Act and the Supreme Court. In the newspaper roundtable, Mr. Sabatine and Mr. Willis discussed headlines from various papers across the country. Via telephone, Mr. Isikoff talked about Senator Robert Dole’s corporate travel. Via remote link, Mr. Tsongas talked about a nine page memo he wrote on American third parties. He also shared his views on both the Clinton administration and some of the Republicans who have announced their presidential candidacy." |
| Monday, April 17, 1995 | 3 hr. 4 min. | Brian Lamb | Melinda Bates (Director, White House Visitors Office); Peter Braestrup (Communications Director, Library of Congress); Sandra Harding (Spokeswoman, U.S. Postal Service); Tod Lindberg (Editorial Page Editor, Washington Times); Susan Page (White House Correspondent, Newsday); Carl Stout (Member, Vietnam Veterans of America); Andrew Sullivan (Editor, The New Republic); Teresa Tritch (Washington Bureau Chief, Money Magazine); Bob Wencel (Strategic Planning and Analysis Chief, Internal Revenue Service) | "In the first segment, Ms. Page discussed the morning newspaper headlines as well as the White House Easter Egg Roll to be held this morning. In the newspaper roundtable segment, Mr. Sullivan and Mr. Lindberg discussed the morning headline stories. Ms. Bates and Ms. McCormick described today’s White House Easter Egg Roll via remote connection from the South Lawn. Live shots of the South Lawn activities were shown occasionally throughout the program. Mr. Braestrup and Mr. Stout debated Vietnam War issues and new Robert MacNamara book. Mr. Braestrup was Saigon Bureau Chief for the Washington Post during the Vietnam War. Ms. Tritsch talked about an interview she conducted with President Clinton. In the last segment, Mr. Wencel talked about tax reform proposals, while Ms. Harding talked about the huge volume of mail caused by federal income tax returns. President and Mrs. Clinton’s remarks at the Easter Egg Roll were shown live." |
| Tuesday, April 18, 1995 | 3 hr. 2 min. | Lew Ketcham; Susan Swain | Bob Drummond (Correspondent, Bloomberg Business News); Former Rep. Thomas "Tom" S. Foley (D-WA); Jerry J. Jasinowski (President, National Association of Manufacturers); Former Rep. Robert H. Michel (R-IL); David Nichols (Author); Former Vice President of the United States J. "Dan" Quayle; James Risen (Washington Bureau Correspondent, Los Angeles Times); Gregory Wetstone (Legislative Affairs Director, Natural Resources Defense Council) | "In the first segment, Mr. Drummond discussed cases the U.S. Supreme Court will be considering during the upcoming term. In the newspaper roundtable, former House Speaker Foley and former Minority Leader Michel reviewed the top stories in the morning newspapers. Via telephone, Mr. Nichols discussed his latest book, Ernie’s War: The Best of Ernie Pyle’s World War II Dispatches. In the point-counterpoint segment, Mr. Jasinowski and Mr. Wetstone debated the pros and cons of regulatory reform measures. Mr. Risen discussed his story in today’s Los Angeles Times concerning federal funding for the U.S. helium reserves. In the final segment, former Vice President Quayle discussed the Republican presidential candidates, as well as his own decisions not to run for president nor for governor of Indiana." |
| Wednesday, April 19, 1995 | 3 hr. 2 min. | Connie Doebele; Steve Scully | Lamar Alexander (Presidential Candidate, R-TN); Lynn Cutler (Vice Chair, Democratic National Committee); Jill Dougherty (White House Correspondent, CNN); Mae C. Jemison M.D. (Former Astronaut, NASA); Stan Mack (Editorial Cartoonist, Village Voice); Michael "Mike" D. McCurry (White House Press Secretary); Jeremy A. Rabkin (Correspondent, American Spectator); Mary Schneider (Correspondent, Indianapolis Star/News) | "In the first segment, Ms. Dougherty discussed President Clinton’s news conference of last night. In the newspaper roundtable, Ms. Cutler and Republican presidential candidate Alexander discussed the morning headline stories. Ms. Schneider discussed the presidential plans of Senator Richard Lugar, who will officially announce his candidacy later today. Mr. Rabkin discussed the debate over Affirmative Action . Ms. Jemison described her experiences as the first female African-American astronaut and her career with NASA. Mr. McCurry talked about last night’s presidential news conference. Mr. Mack talked about the cartoons he draws for The Village Voice and his new book, Real Life American Revolution, and demonstrated how he draws a comic strip." |
| Thursday, April 20, 1995 | 3 hr. 2 min. | Lew Kectcham; Susan Swain | Josh Handler (Former Research Coordinator, Greenpeace USA); John D. Holum (Director, Arms Control and Disarmament Agency); Laura Ingraham (Member, Board of Directors, Independent Women's Forum); Rep. Ernest Jim Istook (R-OK); Jonathan S. Landay (National Security Correspondent, Christian Science Monitor); Neil Livingstone (President, Institute on Terrorism and Subnational Conflict); Rep. Cynthia McKinney (D-GA); Richard L. Tafel (executive director, Log Cabin Republicans) | "Discussions focused on the car bombing of a federal office building in Oklahoma City, Oklahoma. In the first segment, Mr. Landay discussed the response of the American public to the bombing. In the newspaper roundtable, Ms. Ingraham and Rep. McKinney reviewed the top stories in the morning newspapers, focusing on the oral arguments presented to the Supreme Court yesterday on a case concerning creation of congressional districts based on racial composition. Mr. Tafel previewed a forum on the gay rights movement being held by the National Lesbian and Gay Journalists Association. In the point-counterpoint segment, Mr. Handler and Mr. Holum debated the positive and negative aspects of the Nuclear Non-Proliferation Treaty (NPT), which comes up for review this year. Mr. Livingstone and Rep. Istook discussed the bombing of the federal building in Oklahoma City. Rep. Istook represents the Oklahoma City area in the U.S. House. In the final segment, Labor Secretary Reich discussed job and wage issues." |
| Friday, April 21, 1995 | 3 hr. 4 min. | Brian Lamb | William Buzenberg (News Director, National Public Radio); Suzanne Garment; Daniel Goure (Scholar, Center for Strategic and International Studies); Rod MacLeish (Washington, D.C. Editor, Monitor Radio); Robert Schweitzer (Director, Global Strategy Institute); Victoria Toensing (Former Deputy Assistant Attorney General, Criminal Division, U.S. Department of Justice); Neil Westergaard (Executive Editor, Denver Post); James J. Zogby (Founder and President, Arab American Institute) | "In the first segment, Mr. Buzenberg talked about news coverage of the Oklahoma City bombing and other events. In the newspaper roundtable segment, Ms. Garment and Mr. MacLeish reviewed the morning headline stories. In the point-counterpoint segment, Mr. Goure and Mr. Zogby debated the best responses to terrorist attacks. In the last segment, Ms. Toensing, who established the Justice Department terrorism unit during the Reagan administration, and Mr. Schweitzer talked about the Oklahoma City bombing." |
| Saturday, April 22, 1995 | 1 hr. 30 min. | Lew Ketcham | Philip Clapp (executive director, Environmental Information Center); Christopher Georges (Correspondent, Wall Street Journal); John Kyte, (Environmental Quality Director, National Association of Manufacturers); Michael Martin (executive director, Campaigns for the Environment); John Podhoretz (Correspondent, New York Post) | "Mr. Martin talked about the 25th anniversary Earth Day celebration to be held later that day on the Washington mall. In the point-counterpoint segment, Mr. Kyte and Mr. Clapp discussed the state of current U.S. environmental policy. In the newspaper roundtable, Mr. Georges and Mr. Podhoretz talked about current events in the news, especially the Oklahoma City bombing." |
| Sunday, April 23, 1995 | 1 hr. 58 min. | Steve Scully | Sen. Byron L. Dorgan (D-ND); David Hage (Correspondent, U.S. News & World Report); Madeleine M. Kunin (Deputy Secretary, Department of Education); Former U.S. Attorney General Richard Thornburgh | "Participants discussed the April 19 bombing in Oklahoma City. In the opening segment, Mr. Hage discussed his story on the Senate’s review of the federal budget proposals. In the newspaper roundtable, Ms. Kunin and Mr. Thornburgh reviewed the top stories in the news, focusing on the bombing of a federal office building in Oklahoma City, OK. In the final segment, Senator Dorgan previewed the upcoming Farm Summit, which will be held in Ames, Iowa." |
| Monday, April 24, 1995 | 3 hr. 2 min. | Brian Lamb | Fred Downs (Veteran, Vietnam War); Barbara Ehrenreich (Editor, Ms. Magazine); Stanley Karnow (Author); Thomas W. Lippman (Correspondent, Washington Post); John Merriam (Employee, World Bank); Harry Summers (Correspondent, Los Angeles Times); Joe Volk (Executive Secretary, Friends Committee on National Legislation) | "Mr. Lippman discussed his experience covering the Vietnam War. In the newspaper roundtable, Mr. Summers and Ms. Ehrenreich discussed headlines from various papers across the country. In a point-counterpoint discussion, Mr. Downs and Mr. Volk discussed what they did during the Vietnam War and gave their opinions of Robert McNamara’s book and his role in the war. Mr. Karnow and Mr. Merriam discussed Robert McNamara’s role in the Vietnam War and the media reaction to McNamara’s book In Retrospect." |
| Tuesday, April 25, 1995 | 3 hr. 4 min. | Bruce Collins; Susan Swain | Lt. Col. Regina Aune (U.S. Army); David Lawsky (Correspondent, Reuters News Service); Sen. John S. McCain III (R-AZ); Former Col. Edward Sieffert (U.S. Department of Defense); Sen. Paul Simon (D-IL); David Stark (Correspondent, Atlantic Monthly); David Yepsen (Politics Editor, Des Moines Register) | "Mr. Lawsky discussed the legislative agenda for the Senate. In the newspaper roundtable, Senators Simon and McCain discussed headlines from various papers across the country. Via telephone, Mr. Yepsen discussed the National Rural Conference taking place in Ames, Iowa. Via telephone, Mr. Stark discussed his piece in Atlantic Monthly about Congress. Mr. Seiffert talked about the 1980 Iranian hostage rescue attempt. Ms. Anune talked about the evacuation of Vietnamese orphans at the end of the Vietnam War, known as Operation Babylift, and her experience as the operation’s medical crew director." |
| Wednesday, April 26, 1995 | 3 hr. 2 min. | Lew Ketcham; Susan Swain | Eric Bates (Correspondent, Mother Jones Magazine); Lynne Cheney (Former Chair, National Endowment for the Humanities); William Colby (Former Director, Central Intelligence Agency); Laura Murphy Lee, (Director, Washington D.C. Office, American Civil Liberties Union); Former Sen. George S. McGovern (D-SD); Steven Sample (President, University of Southern California); Sen. Arlen Specter (R-PA); John H. Taylor (executive director, Richard Nixon Foundation); Robert Timberg (Washington Correspondent, Baltimore Sun); Douglas C. Waller (Correspondent, Time Magazine) | "Mr. Waller talked about the Senate Intelligence hearing to confirm Assistant Defense Secretary John Deutch as the new Director of Central Intelligence. In the newspaper roundtable, Mr. McGovern and Ms. Cheney discussed headlines from various papers across the country. Via telephone, Mr. Bates talked about his article in Mother Jones entitled "What You Need to Know About Jesse Helms". In the point-counterpoint discussion, Mr. Colby and Ms. Lee discussed anti-terrorism legislation. Via remote link, Mr. Specter talked about the confirmation hearing for Assistant Defense Secretary John Deutch and the hearings he's chairing tomorrow on anti-terrorism legislation. Mr. Sample discussed several issues facing his and other universities, including tuition, student loans and the financial viability of public schools. Via telephone, Mr. Taylor talked about the Nixon stamp. Mr. Timberg discussed his book The Nightingale's Song and how the Vietnam War affected the lives and careers of five Washington officials." |
| Thursday, April 27, 1995 | 3 hr. 8 min. | Steve Scully | Sen. Pete V. Domenici (R-NM); Richard S. Dunham (Politics Correspondent, Business Week); James K. Glassman (Columnist, Washington Post); Hershel W. Gober (Deputy Secretary, U.S. Department of Veterans Affairs); Former Rep. Guy Vander Jagt (R-MI); Steven Kull (Director, International Policy Attitudes Program, University of Maryland, College Park); Franklin Sonn (South African Ambassador to the United States); Sen. Fred Thompson (R-TN) | "Mr. Dunham discussed the fiscal year 1996 budget process, what is in the budget, and how it will be received in the Senate. Via remote link, Mr. Domenici discussed why he cancelled the Senate Budget Committee’s markup of the budget. In the newspaper roundtable, Mr. Vander Jagt and Mr. Glassman discussed newspaper headlines from various papers across the country. Via remote link, Senator Thompson discussed today’s hearing on terrorism and the president’s proposed anti-terrorism legislation. Via telephone, Mr. Kull discussed his findings in a study about Americans' attitudes toward U.N. peacekeeping. Mr. Sonn discussed the one year anniversary of President Mandela’s election as president of South Africa. Mr. Gober discussed issues faced by Vietnam veterans." |
| Friday, April 28, 1995 | 3 hr. 1 min. | Connie Doebele; Brian Lamb | Robert Creamer (Representative, Citizen Action); Dan Goodgame (Washington Bureau Chief, Time Magazine); James Kitfield (Defense Correspondent, Government Executive); Morton M. Kondracke (Executive Editor, CQ Today); Caroline Stinebower (Spokeswoman, National Federation of Independent Business); Wallace Terry; Martin Tolchin (Founder, Publisher, & Editor-in-Chief, The Hill | "Mr. Goodgame talked about the current headlines. In the newspaper roundtable, Mr. Kondracke and Mr. Tolchin discussed headlines from various papers across the country. In the point-counterpoint discussion, Ms. Stinebower and Mr. Creamer debated whether product liability laws need to be changed. Mr. Kitfield and Mr. Terry, both authors on Vietnam, and viewers, discussed the war and its legacy for U.S. society." |
| Saturday, April 29, 1995 | 1 hr. 31 min. | Bruce Collins | James Craigen (Social Work Professor, Howard University); Anita Dunn (Political Consultant, Squier-Eskew Communications); Carl P. Leubsdorf (Washington Bureau Chief, Dallas Morning News); Donna Matias (Attorney, Institute for Justice); Leigh Ann Metzger (deputy director for Communications, Republican National Committee | "Mr. Leubsdorf previewed the White House Correspondents Dinner scheduled for later that evening. In the point-counterpoint discussion, Mr. Craigen and Ms. Matias debated the merits of interracial adoption. In the newspaper roundtable, Ms. Metzger and Ms. Dunn discussed headlines from various papers across the country. In his weekly radio address, President Clinton said he was “terribly disappointed” that the Supreme Court struck down a law passed by Congress to keep guns away from schools. In light of the ruling, he indicated he has directed the Attorney General to report to him, within one week, on what constitutional action he can take to keep guns out of schools." |
| Sunday, April 30, 1995 | 2 hr. 1 min. | Steve Scully | Patrice Hill (Economics Correspondent, Washington Times); Rep. Susan Molinari (R-NY); Del. Eleanor Holmes Norton (D-DC); Rosa Parks (Activist) | "Ms. Hill talked about current issues, including the upcoming budget battle in the Congress. In the newspaper roundtable, Ms. Norton and Ms. Molinari discussed headlines from various papers across the country. Ms. Parks talked about her new book, Quiet Strength, which deals with her lifelong involvement in the civil rights movement." |
