= The Cornell Lunatic =

Magazine

- Categories: Humor magazine
- Founder: Joey Green
- Founded: 1978, Cornell University
- First issue: April 1, 1978
- Based in: Ithaca, New York, U.S.
- Language: English
- Website: www.cornelllunatic.com

The Cornell Lunatic is the college humor magazine at Cornell University, founded on April 1, 1978, by Joey Green.

== History ==
During Green's two-year tenure as editor, the Lunatic was a 72-page glossy magazine of satire and parody published once a semester. The Lunatic staff was responsible for many pranks on campus, including a parody of the 1979 Cornell–Yale Homecoming Football Game program, sold by the Lunatic staff as the real thing at the football stadium, resulting in Green's arrest and near expulsion from the university. Today, the Lunatic continues to publish once a semester, and the magazine is distributed on campus for free.

Material from the Cornell Lunatic from 1978 to 1981 was reprinted in the 1982 trade paperback book, Hellbent on Insanity, a collection of the best college humor, published by Holt, Rinehart & Winston and edited by Green, fellow Lunatic alumnus Alan Corcoran, and Bruce Handy, former editor of the Stanford Chaparral.

The Lunatic's spring 1983 issue, celebrating the magazine's fifth anniversary, featured contributions by professional cartoonists Mort Walker, B.K. Taylor, Robert Leighton, Shary Flenniken, Bobby London, Ron Hauge, Lloyd Dangle, Mimi Pond, and Ed Subitzky.

Over the years, the Cornell Lunatic has featured interviews with comedians John Cleese, Jay Mohr, and Ron Funches, and endorsements by comedians Jon Stewart, Bill Maher, Norm Macdonald, Andy Dick, author Dave Barry, and filmmaker Kevin Smith.

In the spring of 2005, under editor Demian Caponi, the Lunatic staff distributed a full-scale parody of The Cornell Daily Sun on campus.

On March 29, 2008, more than fifty Lunatic alumni and guests gathered at the Cornell Club of New York in Manhattan to celebrate the Lunatic's 30th anniversary and the publication of the book Lunacy: The Best of the Cornell Lunatic.

In March 2016, the Lunatic hosted a night of comedy at Willard Straight Hall featuring comedian Eric Schwartz, aka Smooth-E.

Honorary members of the Cornell Lunatic Alumni Association include Firesign Theatre's Phil Proctor, American Bystander editor and publisher Michael Gerber, and The Simpsons producer Mike Reiss.

Throughout the 2020 coronavirus pandemic, the Lunatic continued to produce digital issues, returning to print in Fall 2021. They hosted comedian and actor Ronny Chieng for a virtual event in April 2021. Later that year, the club established a second formal mascot, “Honse,” a horse with an unspecified illness. As of 2022, the club boasted nearly 30 members and was one of the strongest comedy groups on Cornell’s campus.

In Fall 2022, under the editorship of Gabriella Crawley, the Lunatic published a 72-page issue (“seX Files”), followed in Spring 2023 with a record-breaking 76-page issue (“Science Edition”), the lengthiest issue in the magazine's then 45-year history.

== Notable alumni ==
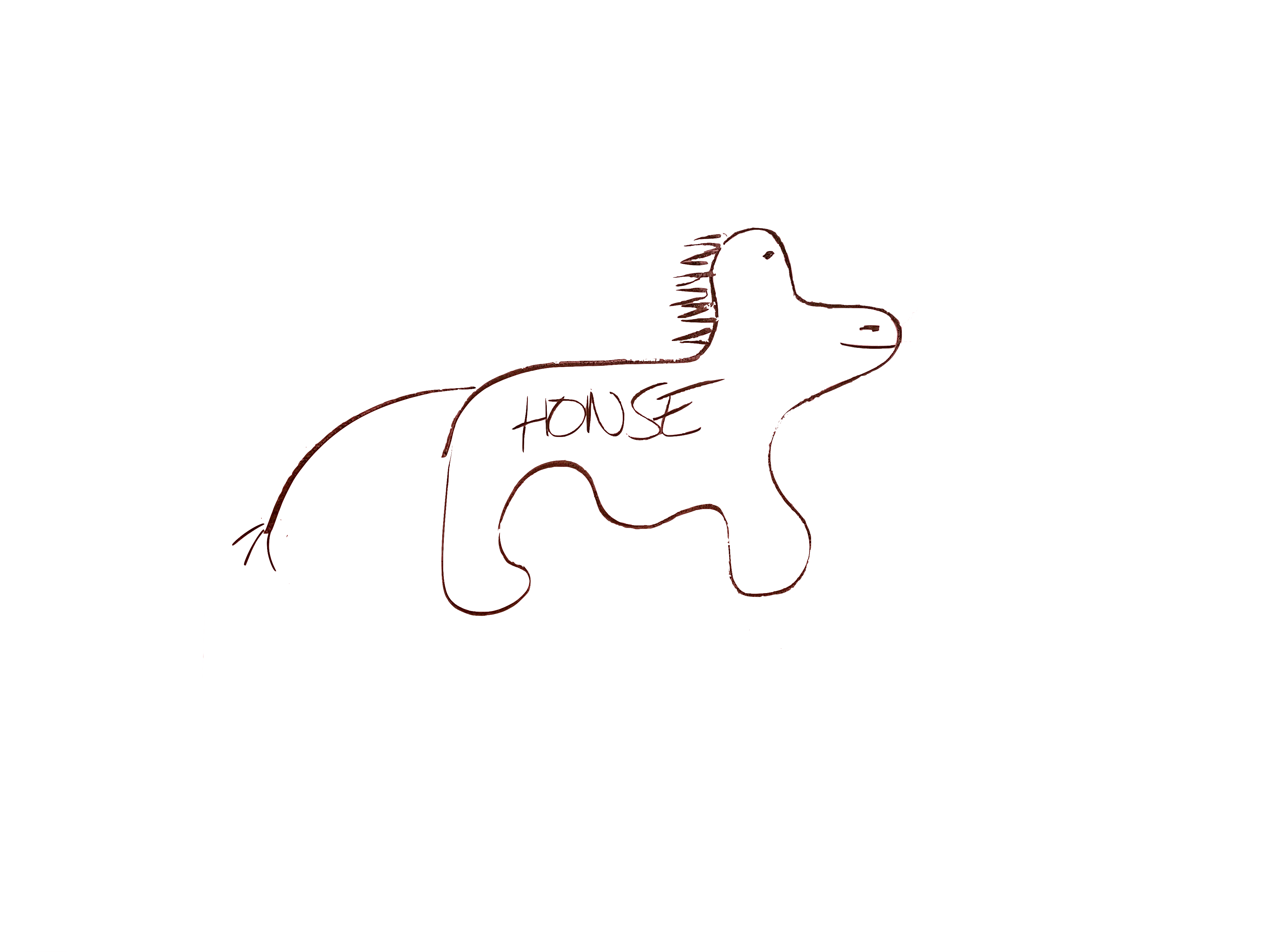
The Cornell Lunatic's official mascot, Honse.

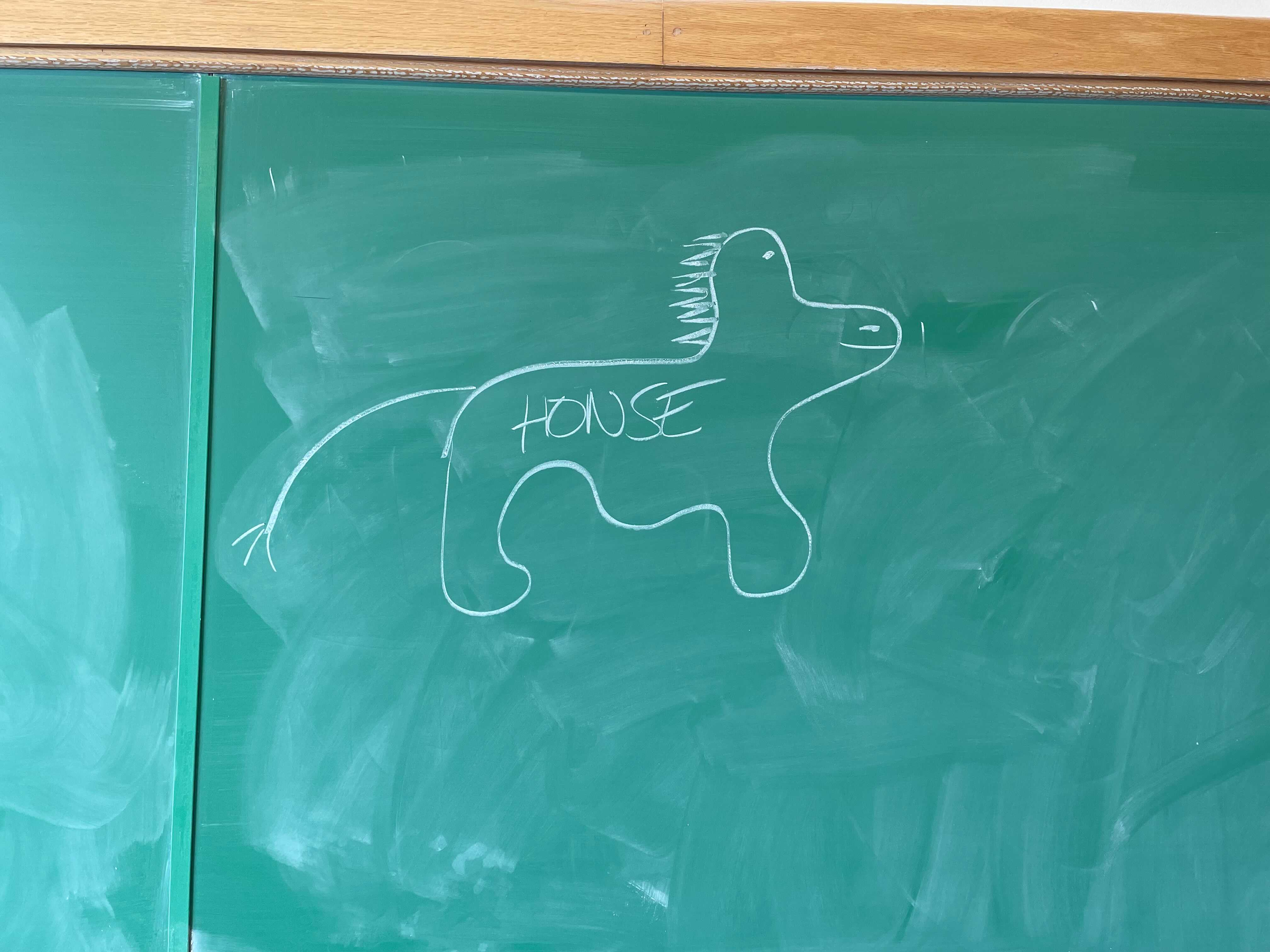
Honse, rendered in chalk, in a 2022 oeuvre.

Some notable alumni from the magazine include:

- Glenn Adamson, editor of The Journal of Modern Craft, author, and museum curator
- Jeff Bercovici, author and Los Angeles Times Business editor
- Lawrence Carrel, financial author and contributor to the Wall Street Journal and Forbes
- Adam-Troy Castro, science fiction, fantasy, and horror novelist, and winner of the 2008 Philip K. Dick Award
- Alan Corcoran, humor book author
- Adam C. Engst, technology writer and author
- Jordan Fabian, White House correspondent at Bloomberg
- Noah Goldstein, author and UCLA management professor
- Marie Gottschalk, author and University of Pennsylvania political science professor
- Joey Green, author and humorist
- Joyce Hendley, nutrition author
- Amanda Ann Klein, author
- Scott Lapatine, founder and editor-in-chief of Stereogum
- Jill Holtzman Leichter, editor of the All About Birds Regional Field Guides
- Farhad Manjoo, New York Times opinion columnist
- Sendhil Mullainathan, author and Harvard economics professor
- J.T. Myers, Virgin Music Group co-CEO
- Adam Osterweil, children's book author
- Robert Pottle, children's poet
- Marco Recuay, Emmy Award-winning visual effects artist
- Jeff Seeman, screenwriter
- Naren Shankar, producer of The Expanse and CSI
- Chris Spear, technology author
- Colleen Wainwright, TedX speaker
- Robyn Lipsky Weintraub, New York Times and New Yorker crossword puzzle author
- Stefanie Weiss, Washington Post columnist and feature writer
- Jeremy Wolff, travel writer and professional photographer
