= Electoral history of Herbert Hoover =

List of political elections featuring Herbert Hoover as a candidate

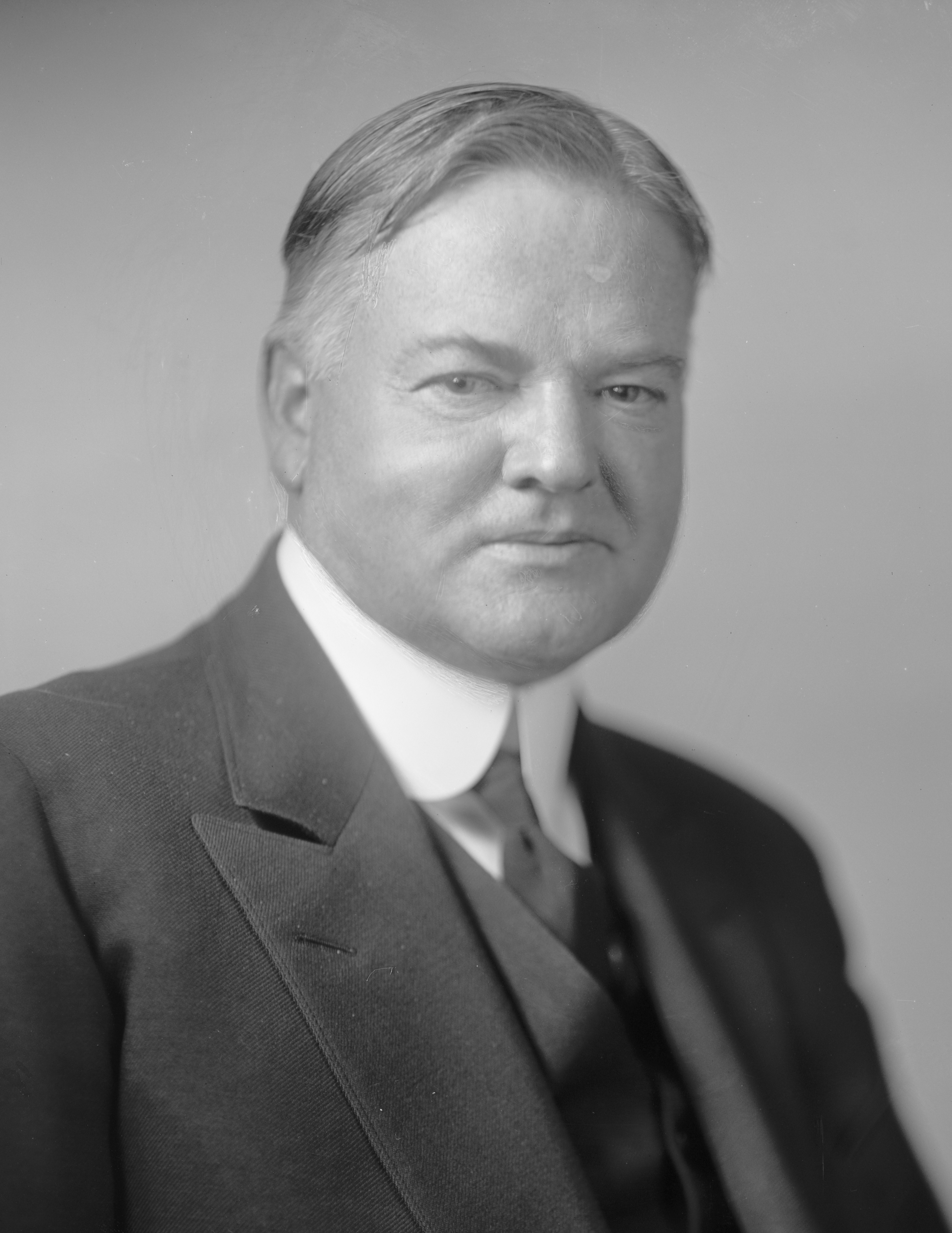
Herbert Hoover

Electoral history of Herbert Hoover, who served as the 31st president of the United States (1929–1933) and 3rd United States Secretary of Commerce (1921–1928).

1920 Democratic presidential primaries:

- Unpledged delegates - 165,460 (29.85%)
- A. Mitchell Palmer - 91,543 (16.51%)
- James M. Cox - 86,194 (15.55%)
- William McAdoo - 74,987 (13.53%)
- Gilbert M. Hitchcock - 37,452 (6.76%)
- Edward I. Edwards - 28,470 (5.14%)
- Herbert Hoover - 28,042 (5.06%)
- William Jennings Bryan - 20,893 (3.77%)
- Robert G. Ross - 13,179 (2.38%)
- James W. Gerard - 4,706 (0.85%)

1920 Republican presidential primaries:

- Hiram W. Johnson - 965,651 (30.30%)
- Leonard Wood - 710,863 (22.30%)
- Frank O. Lowden - 389,127 (12.21%)
- Herbert Hoover - 303,815 (9.53%)
- Unpledged delegates - 298,109 (9.35%)
- Edward R. Wood - 257,841 (8.09%)
- Warren G. Harding - 144,762 (4.54%)
- John J. Pershing - 45,640 (1.43%)
- Howard Sutherland - 33,849 (1.06%)

1920 Republican National Convention (Presidential tally):

Presidential Balloting, RNC 1920
Ballot	1	2	3	4	5	6	7	8	9	10 Before shifts	10 After shifts
Warren G. Harding	65.5	59	58.5	61.5	78	89	105	133	374.5	644.7	692.2
Leonard Wood	287.5	289.5	303	314.5	299	311.5	312	299	249	181.5	156
Frank Lowden	211.5	259.5	282.5	289	303	311.5	311.5	307	121.5	28	11
Hiram Johnson	133.5	146	148	140.5	133.5	110	99.5	87	82	80.8	80.8
William C. Sproul	84	78.5	79.5	79.5	82.5	77	76	76	78	0	0
Nicholas Murray Butler	69.5	41	25	20	4	4	2	2	2	2	2
Calvin Coolidge	34	32	27	25	29	28	28	30	28	5	5
Robert M. La Follette	24	24	24	22	24	24	24	24	24	24	24
Jeter C. Pritchard	21	10	0	0	0	0	0	0	0	0	0
Miles Poindexter	20	15	15	15	15	15	15	15	14	2	0
Howard Sutherland	17	15	9	3	1	0	0	0	0	0	0
Herbert C. Hoover	5.5	5.5	5.5	5	6	5	4	5	6	10.5	9.5
Scattering	11	9	7	9	9	9	6	6	5	5.5	3.5

1928 Republican presidential primaries:

- Herbert Hoover - 2,045,928 (49.73%)
- Frank O. Lowden - 1,317,799 (32.03%)
- George W. Norris - 259,548 (6.31%)
- James Eli Watson - 228,795 (5.56%)
- Guy D. Goff - 128,429 (3.12%)
- Frank B. Willis - 84,461 (2.05%)
- Calvin Coolidge (inc.) - 12,985 (0.32%)
- Charles G. Dawes - 12,297 (0.30%)

1928 Republican National Convention (Presidential tally):

- Herbert Hoover - 837 (76.86%)
- Frank O. Lowden - 74 (6.80%)
- Charles Curtis - 64 (5.88%)
- James Eli Watson - 45 (4.13%)
- George W. Norris - 24 (2.20%)
- Guy D. Goff - 18 (1.65%)
- Calvin Coolidge (inc.) - 17 (1.56%)
- Blank - 5 (0.46%)
- Charles G. Dawes - 4 (0.37%)
- Charles Evans Hughes - 1 (0.09%)

1928 United States presidential election:

- Herbert Hoover/Charles Curtis (R) - 21,427,123 (58.2%) and 444 electoral votes (40 states carried)
- Al Smith/Joseph Taylor Robinson (D) - 15,015,464 (40.8%) and 87 electoral votes (8 states carried)
- Norman Thomas/James H. Maurer (Socialist) - 267,478 (0.7%)
- William Z. Foster/Benjamin Gitlow (Communist) - 48,551 (0.1%)
- Others - 48,396 (0.1%)

1932 Republican presidential primaries:

- Joseph I. France - 1,137,948 (47.50%)
- Herbert Hoover (incumbent) - 861,602 (35.96%)
- George W. Norris - 139,514 (5.82%)
- Jacob S. Coxey - 100,844 (4.21%)
- Hiram W. Johnson - 64,464 (2.69%)
- Olin J. Ross - 48,867 (2.04%)
- Unpledged delegates - 1,236 (0.05%)
- Others - 6,126 (0.26%)

1932 Republican National Convention (Presidential tally):

- Herbert Hoover (incumbent) - 1,127 (97.92%)
- John J. Blaine - 13 (1.13%)
- Calvin Coolidge - 5 (0.43%)
- Joseph I. France - 4 (0.35%)
- Charles W. Dawes - 1 (0.09%)
- James W. Wadsworth - 1 (0.09%)

1932 United States presidential election

- Franklin D. Roosevelt/John Nance Garner (D) - 22,821,277 (57.4%) and 472 electoral votes (42 states carried)
- Herbert Hoover/Charles Curtis (R) (inc.) - 15,761,254 (39.7%) and 59 electoral votes (6 states carried)
- Norman Thomas/James H. Maurer (Socialist) - 884,885 (2.2%)
- William Z. Foster/James H. Ford (Communist) - 103,307 (0.3%)
- William D. Upshaw/Frank S. Regan (Prohibition) - 81,905 (0.2%)
- William Hope Harvey/Frank Hemenway (Liberty) - 53,425 (0.1%)
- Verne L. Reynolds/J.W. Aiken (Socialist Labor) - 33,276 (0.1%)
- Others - 12,569 (0.1%)

1936 Republican presidential primaries:

- William E. Borah - 1,478,676 (44.48%)
- Alf Landon - 729,908 (21.96%)
- Frank Knox - 527,054 (15.85%)
- Earl Warren - 350,917 (10.56%)
- Stephen A. Day - 155,732 (4.69%)
- Warren E. Green - 44,518 (1.34%)
- Leo J. Chassee - 18,986 (0.57%)
- Herbert Hoover - 7,750 (0.23%)

1940 Republican presidential primaries

- Thomas E. Dewey - 1,605,754 (49.76%)
- Jerrold L. Seawell - 538,112 (16.68%)
- Robert A. Taft - 516,428 (16.00%)
- Unpledged - 186,157 (5.77%)
- Charles L. McNary - 133,488 (4.14%)
- R. N. Davis - 106,123 (3.29%)
- Arthur H. Vandenberg - 100,651 (3.12%)
- Wendell Willkie - 21,140 (0.66%)
- Franklin D. Roosevelt (inc.) - 9,496 (0.29%)
- Arthur H. James - 8,172 (0.25%)
- Herbert Hoover - 1,082 (0.03%)
- John W. Bricker - 188 (0.01%)

1940 Republican National Convention (Presidential tally):

First ballot:

- Thomas E. Dewey - 360
- Robert A. Taft - 189
- Wendell Willkie - 105
- Arthur H. Vandenberg - 76
- Arthur H. James - 74
- Joseph William Martin - 44
- Scattering - 40
- Hanford MacNider - 34
- Frank E. Gannett - 33
- Styles Bridges - 28
- Herbert Hoover - 17

Second ballot:

- Thomas E. Dewey - 338
- Robert A. Taft - 203
- Wendell Willkie - 171
- Arthur H. Vandenberg - 73
- Arthur H. James - 66
- Hanford MacNider - 34
- Frank E. Gannett - 30
- Scattering - 29
- Joseph William Martin - 26
- Herbert Hoover - 21
- Styles Bridges - 9

Third ballot:

- Thomas E. Dewey - 315
- Wendell Willkie - 259
- Robert A. Taft - 212
- Arthur H. Vandenberg - 72
- Arthur H. James - 59
- Herbert Hoover - 32
- Hanford MacNider - 28
- Frank E. Gannett - 11
- Scattering - 11
- Styles Bridges - 1

Fourth ballot:

- Wendell Willkie - 306
- Robert A. Taft - 254
- Thomas E. Dewey - 250
- Arthur H. Vandenberg - 61
- Arthur H. James - 56
- Herbert Hoover - 31
- Scattering - 11
- Frank E. Gannett - 4
- Styles Bridges - 1

Fifth ballot:

- Wendell Willkie - 429
- Robert A. Taft - 377
- Arthur H. James - 59
- Thomas E. Dewey - 57
- Arthur H. Vandenberg - 42
- Herbert Hoover - 20
- Scattering - 11
- Handorf MacNider - 4
- Frank E. Gannett - 1

Sixth ballot (before shifts):

- Wendell Willkie - 655
- Robert A. Taft - 318
- Thomas E. Dewey - 11
- Herbert Hoover - 10
- Scattering - 5
- Frank E. Gannett - 1
