= Marx & Lennon =

2005 book

Marx & Lennon: The Parallel Sayings
- Author: n/a (edited by Joey Green)
- Language: English
- Genre: Humor
- Publisher: Hyperion (publisher)
- Publication date: 2005
- Publication place: United States
- Media type: Paperback
- ISBN: 1-4013-0809-0
- OCLC: 62163184
- LC Class: PN6084.H8 M27 2005

Marx & Lennon: The Parallel Sayings is an anthology of 400 humorous quotes from John Lennon and Groucho Marx on a variety of themes. The book's title is a humorous reference to Karl Marx and Vladimir Lenin. Quotations are thematically collected in such a way that the top section of a page contains Marx's quotes, and the bottom section contains Lennon's. The book is edited by Joey Green and includes an introduction by Arthur Marx and a foreword by Yoko Ono. Including the index, it is 254 pages long.
