= The Ithaca Journal =

Newspaper in Ithaca, New York

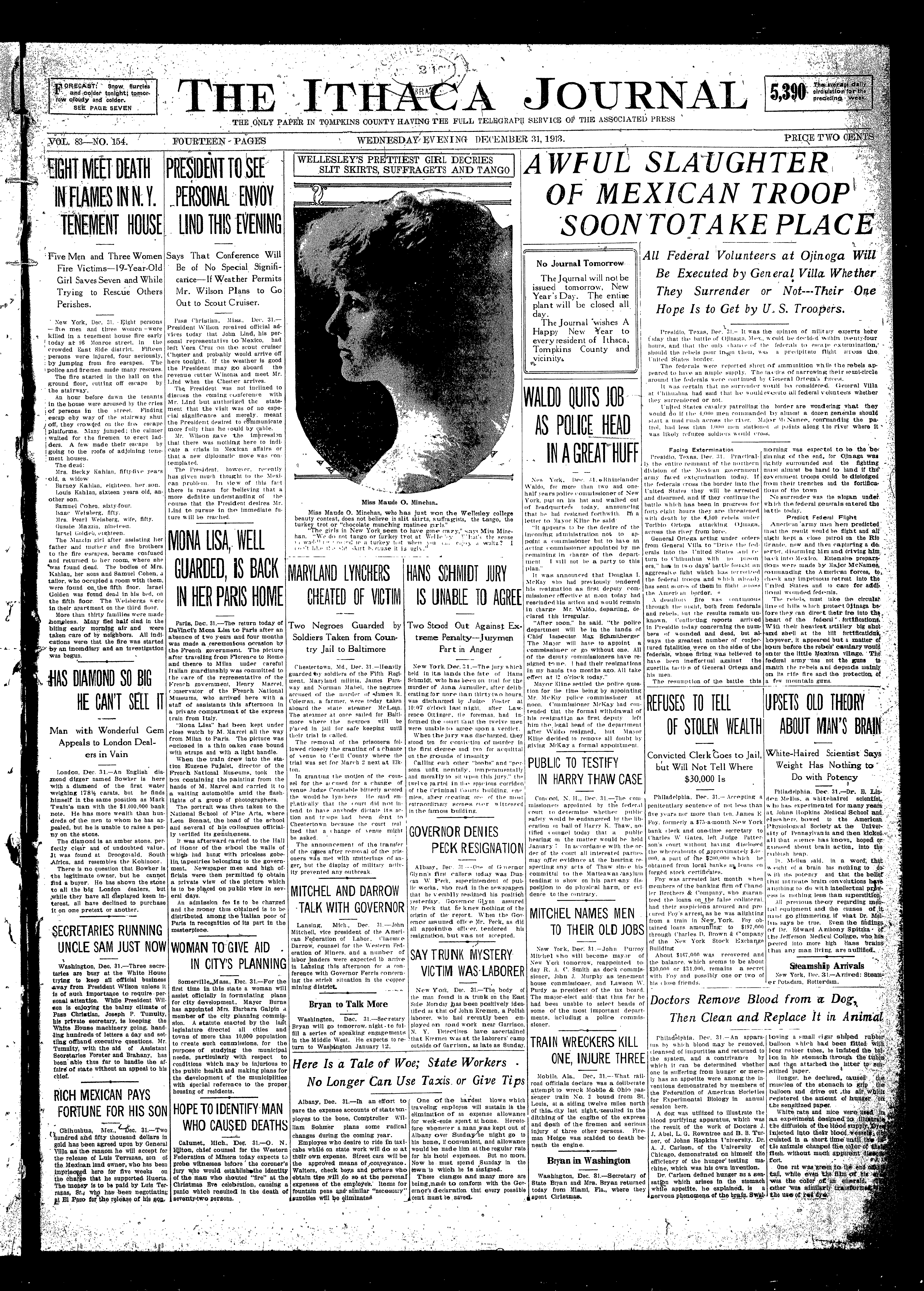
- Front page from December 13, 1913
- Type: Daily newspaper
- Format: Broadsheet
- Owner: USA Today Co.
- Publisher: George Troyano
- Editor: Neill Borowski
- Advertising: Joe Darrow
- Founded: 1815 (as the Seneca Republican, renamed The Ithaca Journal in 1823)
- Headquarters: West State Street, Ithaca, New York, U.S.
- Circulation: 8,809 (as of 2017)
- Website: ithacajournal.com

The Ithaca Journal is a daily morning broadsheet newspaper published in Ithaca, New York. It is locally edited and printed in Johnson City, New York, and publishes Monday through Saturday. It has been owned by USA Today Co. since 1912.

== Publications ==
=== Daily newspaper ===
The Ithaca Journal publishes a daily morning newspaper Monday through Saturday. No edition is printed on Sundays.

Starting on March 27, 2006, The Ithaca Journal included four sections Monday through Friday.

The first section includes local, national and international news. The second section includes several pages of city and county news and sports. The third section, which was launched March 27, 2006, is called Life. The front of this section includes a rotating selection of features:

- Mondays: Food and Personal Finance
- Tuesdays: Outdoors & Recreation and Family
- Wednesdays: Science & Environment
- Thursdays: Health
- Fridays: House & Garden

In addition, Life also includes an Arts & Entertainment page that includes entertainment and celebrity news, TV listings and Amy Dickinson's advice column. There is also a full page of comics and puzzles. Business and personal finance news appears on a page called Dollars & Sense.

The fourth section is entirely classified advertising. On Saturdays, the classified ads expand to two sections.

== Offices ==
The Ithaca Journal is located on West State Street in downtown Ithaca, New York. The Journal's offices spread over two buildings, the newspaper's original building and the neighboring Greenstate Building.

The newsroom is located on the second floor of the original building with various administrative offices on the first floor. The first floor of Greenstate building houses the newspaper's public lobby as well as the advertising offices.

Much of the newspaper's general administrative operations are handled from the Binghamton, New York, offices of the Press & Sun Bulletin.

Behind the original building, on Green Street, is the newspaper's old press facility. This press has been unused since June 10, 2006 when printing was transferred to the Gannett Central New York Production Facility.

=== Ticket and Cortland Ticket ===
On Thursdays a tabloid-sized insert called Ticket is included in The Ithaca Journal. Ticket includes local arts and entertainment news and events calendar. A similar publication, Cortland Ticket, is included in newspapers sold in the Cortland, New York, area on Fridays.

=== Buzz ===
The Ithaca Journal produces a youth-oriented tabloid-sized publication called Buzz every week. The publication is distributed at no cost at retail locations and vending machines throughout the area and features stories of interest to a younger audience as well as an events calendar. Buzz is also distributed in the markets of The Ithaca Journal's sister publications, the Binghamton Press & Sun-Bulletin and Elmira Star-Gazette.

== History ==
Founded in 1815 as the Seneca Republican, it was renamed The Ithaca Journal in 1823. According to its website, the first daily edition of paper was published in 1870 and its offices are housed in the same building it has occupied since 1905.

The Journal was purchased by Frank E. Gannett in 1912, thereby becoming the second local newspaper of what would later become the media conglomerate Gannett Co, Inc. It merged with the Daily News in 1919 and officially adopted the name The Ithaca Journal-News, although it is published under the name The Ithaca Journal.

Among its stars were Kenneth Van Sickle, the long-time sports editor who had a popular column for decades, covering everything from Cornell University and Ithaca College to high schools to local recreational sports.

The newspaper in 1985, under Managing Editor Joseph Junod, won Best of Gannett for Sports Coverage for its weekly Softball magazine. At that time, the Journal also was home to three photographers, whose work was noted throughout Gannett and the newspaper industry.

In May 1996, The Journal switched to a morning printing and distribution schedule after many years as an afternoon daily. Until that point, the newspaper run by Cornell University students, The Cornell Daily Sun had been the only morning daily paper in the city.

On June 12, 2006, the newspaper's printing facilities were relocated to the Gannett Central New York Production Facility in Johnson City, New York, located outside of Binghamton, New York. This new facility also houses the printing facilities for the Binghamton Press & Sun-Bulletin and Elmira Star-Gazette, both daily newspapers owned by Gannett.

Following this relocation, The Ithaca Journal's existing building will be renovated to include expanded office space.

In late 2006, The Ithaca Journal laid off some of its Ithaca-based circulation, marketing and advertising staff. The newspaper's circulation and marketing needs are now managed out of the Binghamton office.

By June 2020, the newspaper's local staff was down to just a single reporter: Matt Steecker. This has resulted in days with no news from Ithaca. Instead, the newspaper uses content from Gannett properties in Binghamton and Elmira to fill the paper and website.

== Pulitzer ==
The Journal was awarded a Pulitzer Prize special citation in 1964 for meritorious public service.

== Criticism ==
The Journal has been frequently criticized throughout its history as pro-war and pro-corporate. Critics have pointed out that the newspaper strongly supported the Vietnam War, headlining an editorial in 1967 "U.S. Troops Must Stay in Vietnam," and condemned protests of the first Persian Gulf War as "unrealistic" in 1991. Prior to World War II, The Journal, as with many American newspapers of the era, praised Europe's dictators. "No objective critic can fail to see that, viewed by the practical standard, [Fascism] has been, on the whole, a success," pronounced a 1932 editorial.

Nevertheless, the paper is not immune to criticism from the right; in recent years, particular attention has been paid to left-leaning editorial page editor John Carberry. The Journal has also consistently endorsed Democratic Party candidates for federal offices in recent years.

In its downsizing, The Journal has eliminated its high school sports staff, relying entirely on staff from Binghamton and Elmira newspapers for Ithaca-area high school coverage.
