= Sam Roberts (journalist) =

American journalist (born 1947)

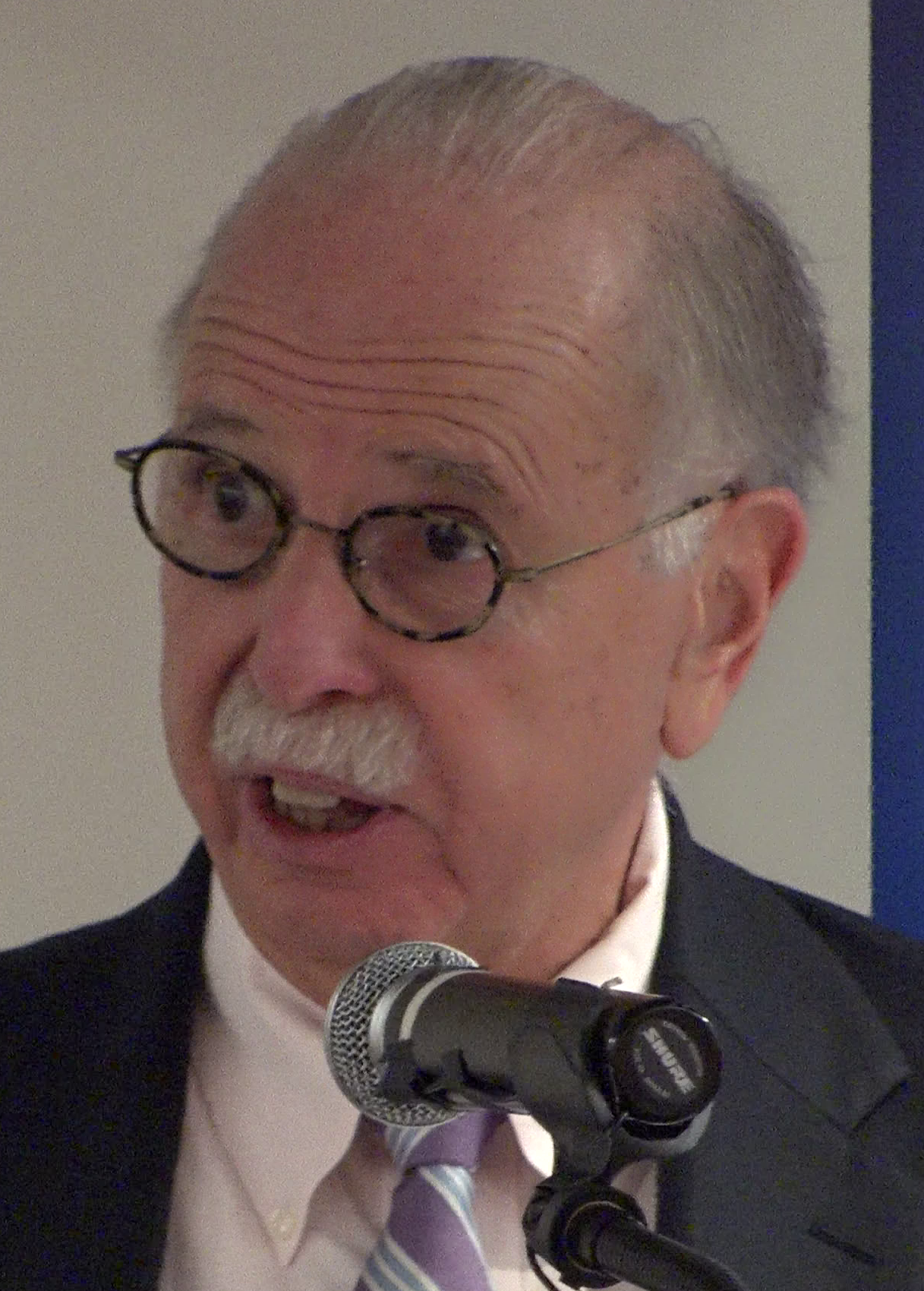
- Roberts in January 2016
- Born: June 20, 1947 (age 79); Brooklyn, New York, U.S.
- Education: Cornell University
- Occupation: Journalist

Sam Roberts (born June 20, 1947) is an American journalist who has written for The New York Times since 1983, serving as Urban Affairs Correspondent from 2005 to 2015. He now serves as an obituaries writer. He is also host of a weekly television news talk show, The New York Times Close Up on CUNY TV.

== Career ==
Roberts graduated from Cornell University in 1968, where he was managing editor of The Cornell Daily Sun and a member of the Quill and Dagger society. He was city editor at the New York Daily News from 1977 to 1981 and political editor from 1981 to 1983, when he joined The New York Times.

== Personal life ==
Roberts is married and lives in New York City. He has two sons.

== Selected works ==
- Who We Are: A Portrait of America Based on the 1990 Census. Crown. 1994. ISBN 9780812921922.
- The Brother: The Untold Story of the Rosenberg Case. Random House. 2001. ISBN 9780375500138.
- A Kind of Genius: Herb Sturz and Society's Toughest Problems. PublicAffairs. 2009. ISBN 978-0-7867-2754-4.
- Grand Central: How a Train Station Transformed America. Grand Central Publishing. 2013. ISBN 978-1-4555-2595-9.
- A History of New York in 101 Objects. Simon and Schuster. 2014. ISBN 978-1-4767-2877-3.
- The New Yorkers: 31 Remarkable People, 400 Years, and the Untold Biography of the World's Greatest City. Bloomsbury Publishing. 2022. ISBN 9781620409787.
- Are They Dead Yet?: The Art of the Obit. Bloomsbury Publishing. 2026. ISBN 9781639733651.
