= Neil Best (journalist) =

American journalist

Neil Best is a retired sports journalist for Newsday, where he worked for over 40 years, specializing in sports media.

== Early life and education ==
At age eleven, Best moved from Hillside, New Jersey to East Northport, New York, on Long Island.

He attended Northport High School, where he wrote for The Rag, the school's student newspaper. He attended Cornell University, where he evaded a necessary swim class, wrote for The Cornell Daily Sun, and graduated in 1982.

== Career ==
After his graduation from Cornell, Best began his career at Newsday in 1982. He left for a few years to work at the Anchorage Times. He returned to Newsday in 1985 and stayed for the remainder of his career.

Throughout his career at Newsday, Best covered a variety of sports topics. He began writing about St. John's men's basketball and later became the beat reporter for the New York Giants. He periodically appeared on Giants Online, a television show hosted by Bob Papa and Pat Hanlon. In 2005, he began his sports media and business column, "SportsWatch".

At Newsday, Best appeared on various media platforms, evaluating everything from sports radio shows to the Super Bowl. Best was widely cited in 2008 for his reporting regarding the end of WFAN sports radio show Mike and the Mad Dog. In 2017, The National Sports Media Association named Best "New York Sportswriter of the Year".

Best retired from Newsday in 2025, after over 40 years. The announcement of his retirement was met with fondness from others in the industry, noting the consistency of his work at Newsday through decades of evolution in sports media.

== Personal life ==
Best is married. He and his wife have two daughters.
