= Joey Green =

American author (born 1958)

Joey Green (born May 26, 1958) is an American author. He has written over sixty books and has been a guest on Good Morning America, The View, and The Tonight Show. He is a former contributing editor to National Lampoon and a former advertising copywriter at J. Walter Thompson. He has also written commercials for Burger King, Disney World, and Eastman Kodak.

== Early life and education ==
He was born in Miami, Florida. He graduated with a BFA from Cornell University in 1980, where he founded the campus humor publication, The Cornell Lunatic, was political cartoonist for The Cornell Daily Sun, and was a member of the Quill and Dagger society. He has two daughters.

== Career ==
Green has been profiled in The New York Times, People magazine, the Los Angeles Times, the Boston Globe, The Washington Post, Forbes, and USA Today, and he has been interviewed on hundreds of radio shows.

== Books ==
- The Cornell Widow Hundredth Anniversary Anthology (Cornell Widow, 1981)
- Hellbent on Insanity (edited with Alan Corcoran and Bruce Handy) (Holt, Rinehart & Winston, 1982)
- The Unofficial Gilligan's Island Handbook (Warner Books, 1987)
- The Get Smart Handbook (Macmillan, 1993)
- The Partridge Family Album (HarperCollins, 1994)
- Polish Your Furniture with Panty Hose (Hyperion, 1995)
- Disney Babies Bedtime Stories (Mouse Works, 1996)
- Hi Bob!: A Self-Help Guide to the Bob Newhart Show (St. Martin's Press, 1996)
- Selling Out: If Famous Authors Wrote Advertising (Macmillan, 1996)
- Paint Your House with Powdered Milk (Hyperion, 1996)
- Wash Your Hair with Whipped Cream (Hyperion, 1997)
- The Bubble Wrap Book (co-authored with Tim Nyberg) (HarperCollins, 1998)
- Joey Green's Encyclopedia of Offbeat Uses for Brand-Name Products (Hyperion, 1998)
- The Zen of Oz: Ten Spiritual Lessons from Over the Rainbow (Renaissance, 1998)
- The Warning Label Book (co-authored with Tim Nyberg and Tony Dierckins) (St. Martin's Press, 1998)
- Monica Speaks (Andrews McMeel, 1998)
- The Official Slinky Book (Berkley, 1999)
- You Know You've Reached Middle Age If... (co-authored with Alan Corcoran) (Andrews McMeel, 1999)
- The Mad Scientist Handbook (Perigee, 2000)
- Clean Your Clothes with Cheez Whiz (Renaissance, 2000)
- Joey Green's Magic Brands (Rodale, 2001)
- The Road to Success Is Paved with Failure (Little, Brown, 2001)
- Clean It! FIx It! Eat It! (Prentice Hall, 2001)
- Jesus and Moses: The Parallel Sayings (Ulysses Press, 2001)
- The Mad Scientist Handbook 2 (Perigee, 2002)
- Senior Moments (co-authored with Alan Corcoran) (Simon & Schuster, 2002)
- Joey Green's Amazing Kitchen Cures (Rodale, 2002)
- Jesus and Muhammad: The Parallel Sayings (Ulysses Press, 2002)
- Joey Green's Gardening Magic (Rodale, 2003)
- How They Met (Black Dog & Leventhal, 2003)
- Joey Green's Incredible Country Store (Rodale, 2004)
- Potato Radio, Dizzy Dice (Perigee, 2004)
- Joey Green's Supermarket Spa (Fair Winds Press, 2005)
- Weird Christmas (Black Dog & Leventhal, 2005)
- Contrary to Popular Belief (Crown, 2005)
- Marx & Lennon: the Parallel Sayings (Hyperion, 2005)
- Joey Green's Rainy Day Magic (Fair Winds Press, 2006)
- The Jolly President: Or Letters George W. Bush Never Read (Lunatic Press, 2006)
- Champagne and Caviar Again?: Complains of the Rich and Famous (co-authored with Debbie Green and Alan Corcoran) (Lunatic Press, 2006)
- Joey Green's Mealtime Magic (Rodale, 2007)
- The Bathroom Professor: Philosophy on the Go (Running Press, 2007)
- Famous Failures (Lunatic Press, 2007)
- Lunacy: The Best of the Cornell Lunatic (Lunatic Press, 2008)
- Joey Green's Fix-It Magic (Rodale, 2008)
- Too Old for MySpace, Too Young for Medicare (co-authored with Alan Corcoran) (Andrews McMeel, 2008)
- You Know You Need a Vacation If . . . (co-authored with Alan Corcoran) (Andrews McMeel, 2008)
- Sarah Palin's Secret Diary (Lunatic Press, 2009)
- Joey Green's Cleaning Magic (Rodale, 2010)
- Joey Green's Amazing Pet Cures (Rodale, 2011)
- Dumb History: The Stupidest Mistakes Ever Made (Plume, 2012)
- Joey Green's Kitchen Magic (Rodale, 2012)
- The Ultimate Mad Scientist Handbook (Lunatic Press, 2012)
- Weird & Wonderful Christmas (Black Dog & Leventhal, 2012)
- Joey Green's Magic Health Remedies (Rodale, 2013)
- Happy Accidents (Hallmark, 2014)
- Last-Minute Survival Secrets (Chicago Review Press, 2014)
- Last-Minute Travel Secrets (Chicago Review Press, 2016)
- Location on Vacation (Chicago Review Press, 2016)
- The Electric Pickle: 50 Experiments from the Periodic Table, from Aluminum to Zinc (Chicago Review Press, 2017)
- Last-Minute Kitchen Secrets (Chicago Review Press, 2018)
- Not So Normal Norbert (co-authored with James Patterson) (Jimmy Patterson Books, 2018)

== Television appearances ==
- The Tonight Show with Jay Leno
- The Rosie O'Donnell Show
- The View
- The Wayne Brady Show
- Fox & Friends
- Good Morning America
- The Other Half
- Extra!
- Dateline NBC
- The Martin Short Show
- Donny & Marie
- Late Night with Conan O'Brien
- Smart Solutions
- Today
- CNN Morning News
- Maury
- CBS Early Show
- The 700 Club
