= Susan Page =

American journalist and biographer

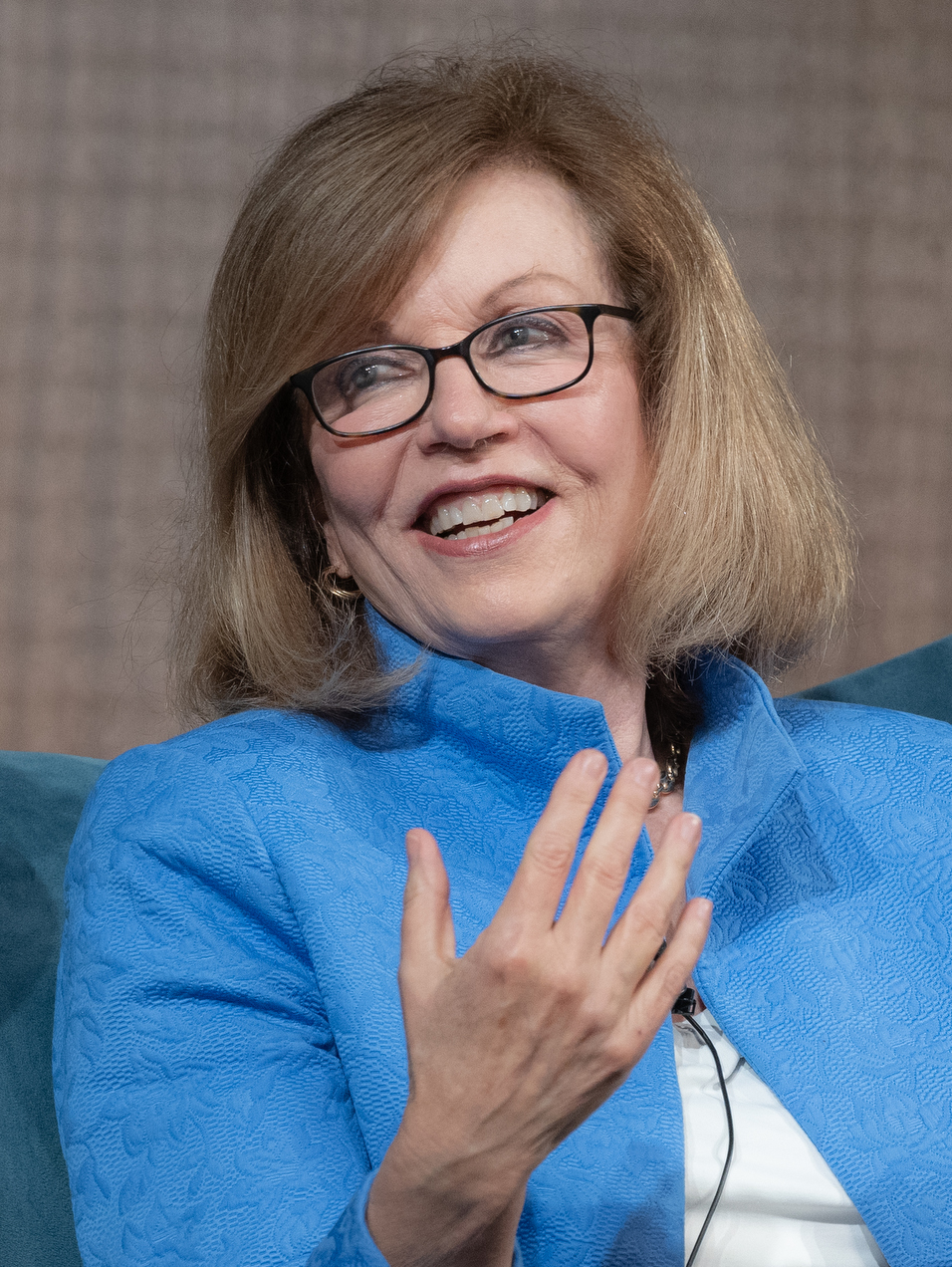
- Page in 2024
- Born: Susan Lea Page; February 12, 1951 (age 75) Wichita, Kansas, U.S.
- Occupation: Writer; journalist
- Education: Northwestern University (BA); Columbia University (MA)
- Spouse: Carl Leubsdorf (m. 1982)

Susan Lea Page (born February 12, 1951) is an American journalist, political commentator, and biographer, and the Washington, D.C. bureau chief for USA Today.

== Early life ==
Page, a native of Wichita, Kansas, is a 1973 graduate of Northwestern University's Medill School of Journalism, where she was editor-in-chief of the Daily Northwestern, and has a master's degree from Columbia University Graduate School of Journalism, where she was a Pulitzer Fellow.

As a child, Page had two passions: music and journalism. She began studying oboe in the third grade and played it in the school orchestras throughout her public-school education. She was also the editor-in-chief of her high school yearbook, The Hoofbeats, and served as a reporter and editor for her high school newspaper, The Stampede. She considered attending music school but ultimately decided to pursue journalism at Northwestern University.

== Career ==
Page has covered seven White House administrations and eleven presidential elections and interviewed ten presidents. She founded and hosted a video newsmaker series for USA Today, "Capital Download". She appears frequently on cable news networks as an analyst and often guest-hosted The Diane Rehm Show, which was syndicated on National Public Radio. She was the first woman to serve as music chairman of the Gridiron Club show and was also president of the club in 2011, the oldest association of journalists in Washington. She was president of the White House Correspondents Association in 2000. She also served as chairman of the Robert F. Kennedy Journalism Awards and has twice been a juror for the Pulitzer Prizes.

External videos
- Q&A interview with Page on The Matriarch, April 14, 2019, C-SPAN

Her first book was published in 2019, a biography of former First Lady Barbara Bush titled The Matriarch: Barbara Bush and the Making of an American Dynasty. In 2021, her biography of House Speaker Nancy Pelosi was published, titled Madam Speaker: Nancy Pelosi and the Lessons of Power. Page signed a deal with Simon & Schuster in 2021 to write a biography of broadcaster Barbara Walters. Page was selected as the moderator of the 2020 vice presidential debate between Mike Pence and Kamala Harris, which took place on October 7, 2020, in Salt Lake City.

Page attracted scrutiny over her journalistic ethics when investigations revealed she had hosted off-the-record events for Trump administration officials like CMS Administrator Seema Verma. USA Today defended her participation, stating she put on the soirees for female officials of both parties.

She is a frequent panelist on Fox News Sunday, This Week on ABC, Washington Week on PBS, and Meet the Press on NBC.

== Awards ==
She has won several awards for her work, including the Merriman Smith Memorial Award, the Aldo Beckman Memorial Award, the Gerald R. Ford Prize for Distinguished Reporting on the Presidency (twice) and the Sigma Delta Chi Distinguished Service Award for Washington Correspondence (shared).

== Personal life ==
In 1982, she married Carl Leubsdorf, syndicated columnist and former Washington bureau chief for The Dallas Morning News, in a non-denominational ceremony in Washington, D.C.

== Bibliography ==
- —— (2019). The Matriarch: Barbara Bush and the Making of an American Dynasty. New York: Twelve. ISBN 978-1-5387-1364-8. OCLC 1032584246.
- —— (2021). Madam Speaker: Nancy Pelosi and the Lessons of Power. New York: Twelve. ISBN 978-1-5387-5069-8. OCLC 1245231617.
- —— (2024). The Rulebreaker: The Life and Times of Barbara Walters. New York: Simon & Schuster. ISBN 978-1-9821-9792-6. OCLC 1393242963.
- —— (2026). The Queen and Her Presidents: The Hidden Hand That Shaped History. New York: HarperCollins. ISBN 978-0-0633-9739-2.
