= Carl Leubsdorf =

American journalist

- Born: Carl Philipp Leubsdorf; March 17, 1938 (age 88); New York City, U.S.
- Education: B.A. Cornell University
- Occupations: Journalist and columnist
- Spouse(s): Carolyn Cleveland Stockmeyer (divorced); Susan Page
- Children: 1 (with Stockmeyer)

Carl Philipp Leubsdorf (born March 17, 1938) is Washington columnist for The Dallas Morning News. He previously was Washington bureau chief from 1981 through 2008.

== Early life and education ==
Leubsdorf was born in New York City, the son of Bertha (née Boschwitz) and Karl Leubsdorf, both pre-World War II Jewish immigrants from Germany. His father worked for Carl Pforzheimer; his mother was a mathematician who endowed the Karl and Bertha Leubsdorf Gallery at Hunter College in honor of her husband.

After attending the Ethical Culture Fieldston School, he attended Cornell University, where he worked for The Cornell Daily Sun, where he was associate editor. He was elected Phi Beta Kappa and graduated with honors in 1959 with a degree in government. He subsequently earned an M.S. with honors in journalism from the Columbia University Graduate School of Journalism.

== Career ==
Leubsdorf has worked as a staff writer for the Associated Press from 1960 to 1975 in New Orleans, New York City, and Washington, D.C., as chief political writer for Associated Press from 1972 to 1975; and as Washington correspondent for The Baltimore Sun from 1976 to 1981 prior to his engagement with The Dallas Morning News.

He is a columnist at The Dallas Morning News and the current secretary of the Gridiron Club and is a past president of both that organization and the White House Correspondents' Association. In April 1997, Leubsdorf was roasted briefly at the WHCA dinner by guest speaker Jon Stewart.

== Personal life ==
Leubsdorf married twice. His first wife was Carolyn (née Cleveland) Stockmeyer, a widowed mother of four children who served as the finance communications director for the Republican National Committee from 1982 to 1989 and the Agriculture Department's publications editor during the George H. W. Bush administration; they had one son, Carl Leubsdorf Jr.

In 1982, he married Susan Page, currently Washington Bureau Chief for USA Today, in a non-denominational ceremony in Washington, D.C.
