= Thomas Lippman =

American journalist

Thomas W. Lippman
- Born: 1940 (age 85–86)
- Education: Columbia University (BA)
- Occupations: Journalist, author
- Known for: Journalist with expertise in the Middle East

Thomas W. Lippman is a journalist and author, specializing in the Middle East and Saudi Arabia–United States relations.

== Life ==
Lippman attended Regis High School in Manhattan and earned his Bachelor of Arts from Columbia as a French major in 1961. Lippman spent more than 30 years with The Washington Post as a writer, editor and diplomatic correspondent, also serving as the Middle East bureau chief for the Post. Lippman currently serves as an adjunct scholar at the Middle East Institute.

== Books ==
- Get the Damn Story: Homer Bigart and the Great Age of American Newspapers. Georgetown University Press. 2023. ISBN 9781647122973.
- Crude Oil, Crude Money: Aristotle Onassis, Saudi Arabia and the CIA. ABC-CLIO. 2019. ISBN 9781440863943.
- Hero of the Crossing: How Anwar Sadat and the 1973 War Changed the World. University of Nebraska Press. 2016. ISBN 978-1612347028.
- Saudi Arabia on the Edge: The Uncertain Future of an American Ally. Potomac Books. 2012. ISBN 978-1597976886.
- Arabian Knight: Colonel Bill Eddy USMC and the Rise of American Power in the Middle East. Selwa Press. 2008. ISBN 978-0970115720.
- Inside the Mirage: America's Fragile Partnership with Saudi Arabia. Basic Books. 2004. ISBN 0813340527.
- Madeleine Albright and the New American Diplomacy. Basic Books. 2000. ISBN 0813397677.
- Egypt After Nasser: Sadat, Peace, and the Mirage of Prosperity. Paragon House. 1989. ISBN 1557780412.
- Understanding Islam: An Introduction to the Muslim World. Penguin Putnam. 1995. ISBN 9780452011601.
- Islam: Politics and Religion in the Muslim World. Foreign Policy Association. 1982. ISBN 9780871240750.
- The Washington Post Deskbook on Style. McGraw Hill. 1989. ISBN 9780070683976.
