= The Cornell Daily Sun =

Newspaper in Ithaca, New York

- The newspaper's 6 November 2017 front page
- Type: Student newspaper
- Format: Tabloid
- Owner: Independent
- Founded: September 16, 1880
- Headquarters: 139 W State St., Ithaca, New York, U.S.
- Circulation: 3,000 (as of 2022)
- ISSN: 1095-8169
- Website: cornellsun.com

The Cornell Daily Sun is an independent newspaper at Cornell University in Ithaca, New York. It is published twice weekly by Cornell University students and hired employees. Founded in 1880, The Sun is the oldest continuously independent college daily in the United States.

The Sun features coverage of the university and its environs. It prints on Wednesdays when the university is open for academic instruction. In addition to these regular issues, The Sun publishes a graduation issue, reunion issue, and a freshman issue, which is mailed to incoming Cornell freshmen before their first semester. The paper is free on campus and online. The Sun edits under its proprietary "Sun Style Guide," an amended version of AP Style.

Aside from a few full-time production positions, The Sun is staffed by Cornell students and is fully independent of the university. It operates out of its own building in downtown Ithaca. As of 2023, The Sun is ranked the third-best college student newspaper in the nation, behind Yale and Syracuse, according to College Choice's annual rankings.

== History ==
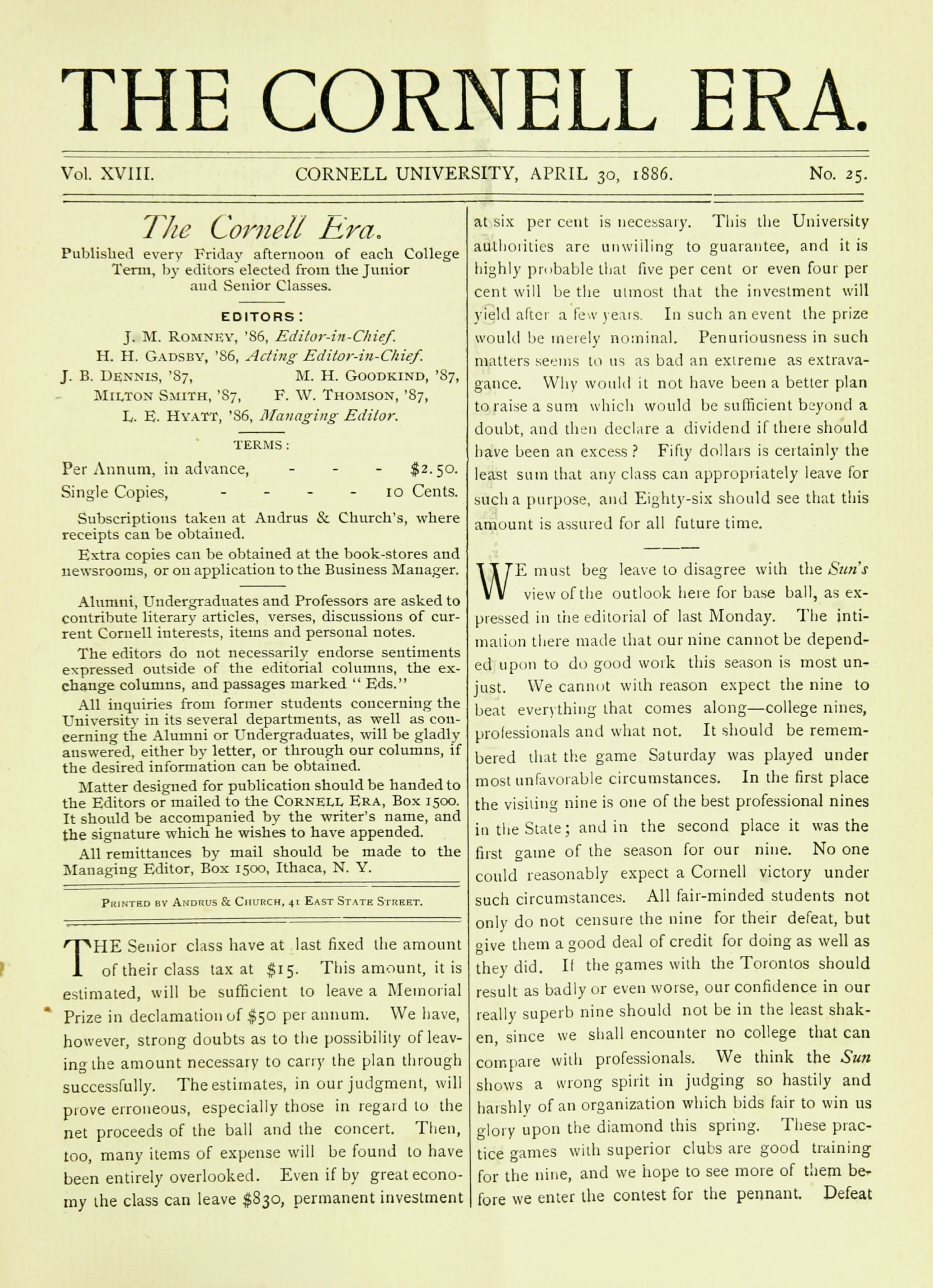
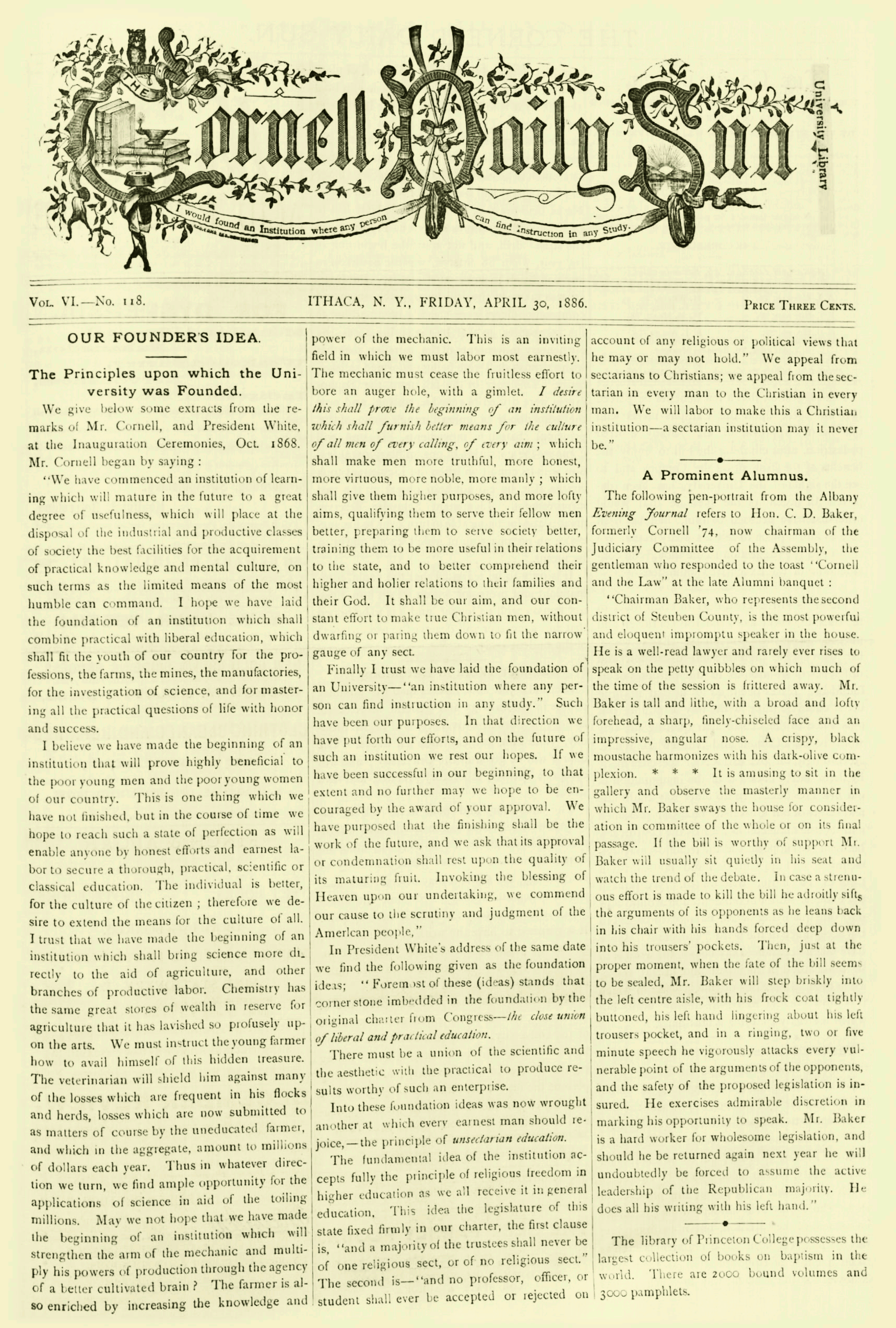
Front pages of The Cornell Era and The Cornell Daily Sun on April 30, 1886

=== 19th century ===
The Cornell Daily Sun was founded in 1880 by William Ballard Hoyt to challenge Cornell's original and leading publication, the weekly Cornell Era, which was founded in 1868. In the newspaper's first edition, published on September 16, 1880, The Sun boasted in its opening paragraph: "We have no indulgence to ask, no favors to beg."

=== 20th century ===
The newspaper later incorporated and changed to daily frequency, earning its longstanding boast "Ithaca's Only Morning Newspaper." In 1912, it added a second, "first collegiate member of the Associated Press."

Following the shift of its main competitor, The Ithaca Journal, from evening to morning daily publication in 1996, The Sun changed its traditional front page slogan which, after several iterations, now states "Independent Since 1880." This period also marked a shift in The Sun's content from national to local and university-related stories.

=== 21st century ===
The newspaper's common features include "Around the Sun," a weekly multimedia recap series, and a sex column that appears weekly on Thursdays.

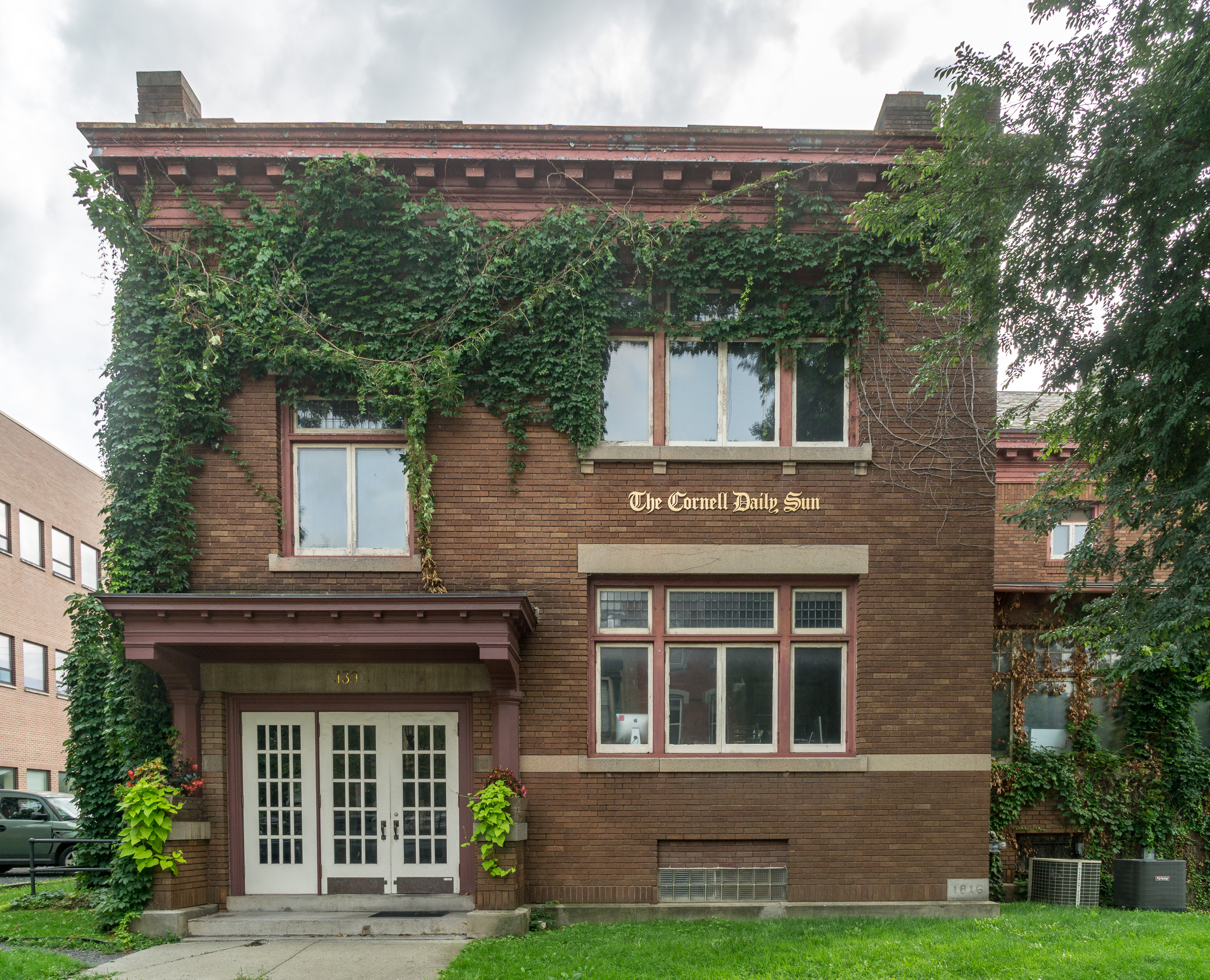
The headquarters of The Cornell Daily Sun

In January 2003, the Cornell Daily Sun Alumni Association purchased the former Elks Lodge in downtown Ithaca, erected 1916. Led by Stanley Chess, the founding president of the Association, John Schroeder '74, and Gary L. Rubin '72, the alumni completely renovated the building over the next several months. Now called the Cornell Daily Sun Building, it has housed the paper's offices since June 2003 and is coincidentally located next door to The Ithaca Journal's offices. The building also houses a kava bar in its basement.

In the fall semester of 2004, The Sun turned free and started featuring full-color front and back pages as part of a redesign in its layout. These moves were partially effected to boost circulation in response to Cornell's Student Assembly's decision to provide The New York Times and USA Today on campus for free to all undergraduate Cornell students.

On September 17, 2005, more than 370 Sun alumni and guests gathered in Manhattan to celebrate The Sun's 125th anniversary. Speakers included Kurt Vonnegut '43, Carl Leubsdorf '59, Sam Roberts '68, Jay Branegan '73, Howard A. Rodman '71, S. Miller Harris '44, and Jeremy Schaap '91. The emcee was Stan Chess '69. A 130th anniversary dinner was held on September 25, 2010.

In 2016, the newspaper announced that it was reducing its publication rate from five days a week to three. In 2020, it further cut back to twice a week as a cost-reducing measure. At the beginning of the 2024-2025 academic year, the paper further reduced publication to once per week, with 24/7 publishing online.

In September 2026, the paper was a subject of national attention after conducting investigation and reporting revealing the names of the Cornell 7, a group of seven Cornell University members of the Chi Phi fraternity accused of drugging and gang-raping an unconscious female student in 2024.

The Cornell Daily Sun Alumni Association, comprising former editors, managers, and staff of the Cornell Daily Sun, exists to further journalism by Cornell University students.

== Alumni ==
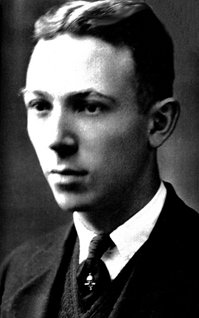
E. B. White, editor-in-chief of The Sun in 1920–21, author of Charlotte's Web, and 1978 Pulitzer Prize winner

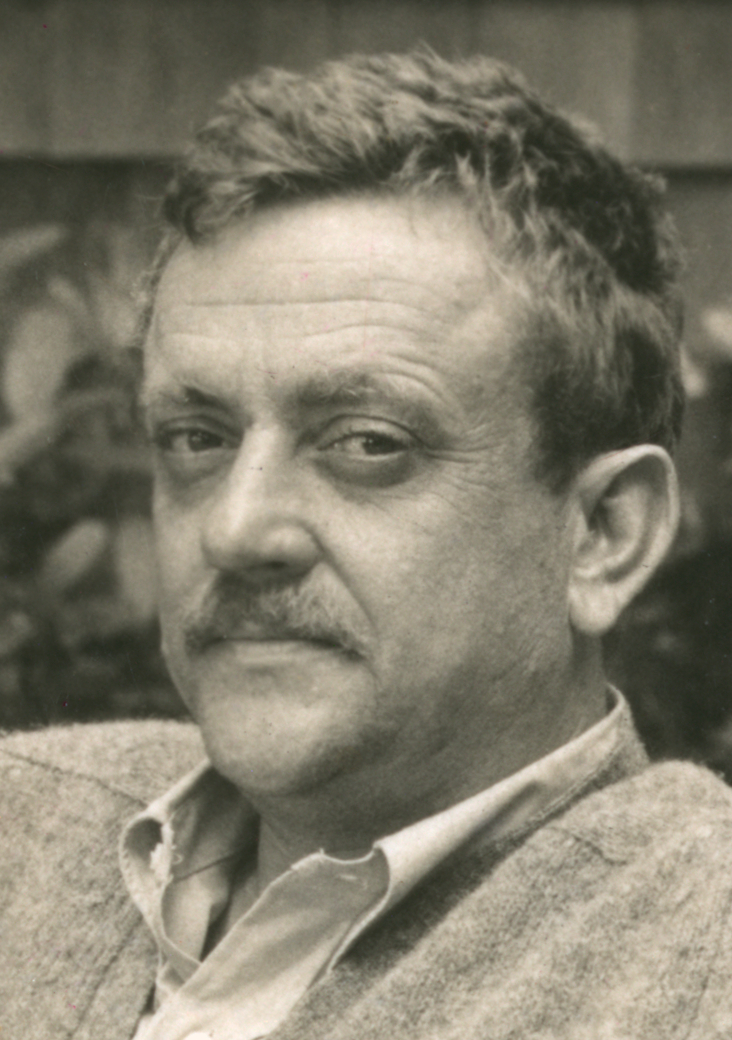
Kurt Vonnegut, associate editor in 1942–43, novelist and satirist

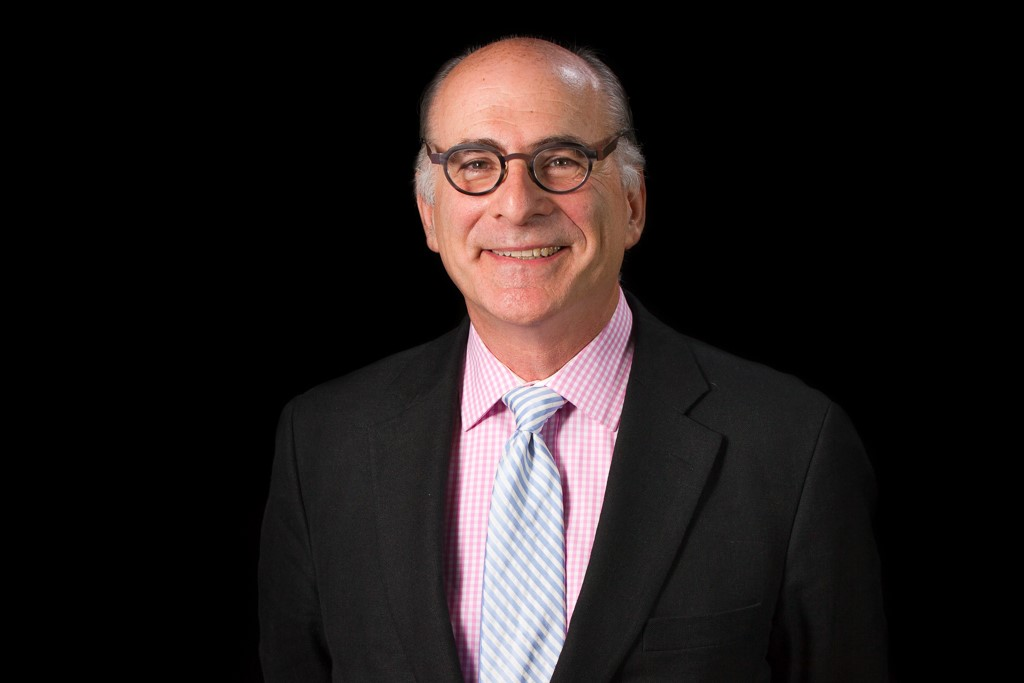
Harold O. Levy, columnist, New York City Schools Chancellor from 2000– 02 and executive director of the Jack Kent Cooke Foundation

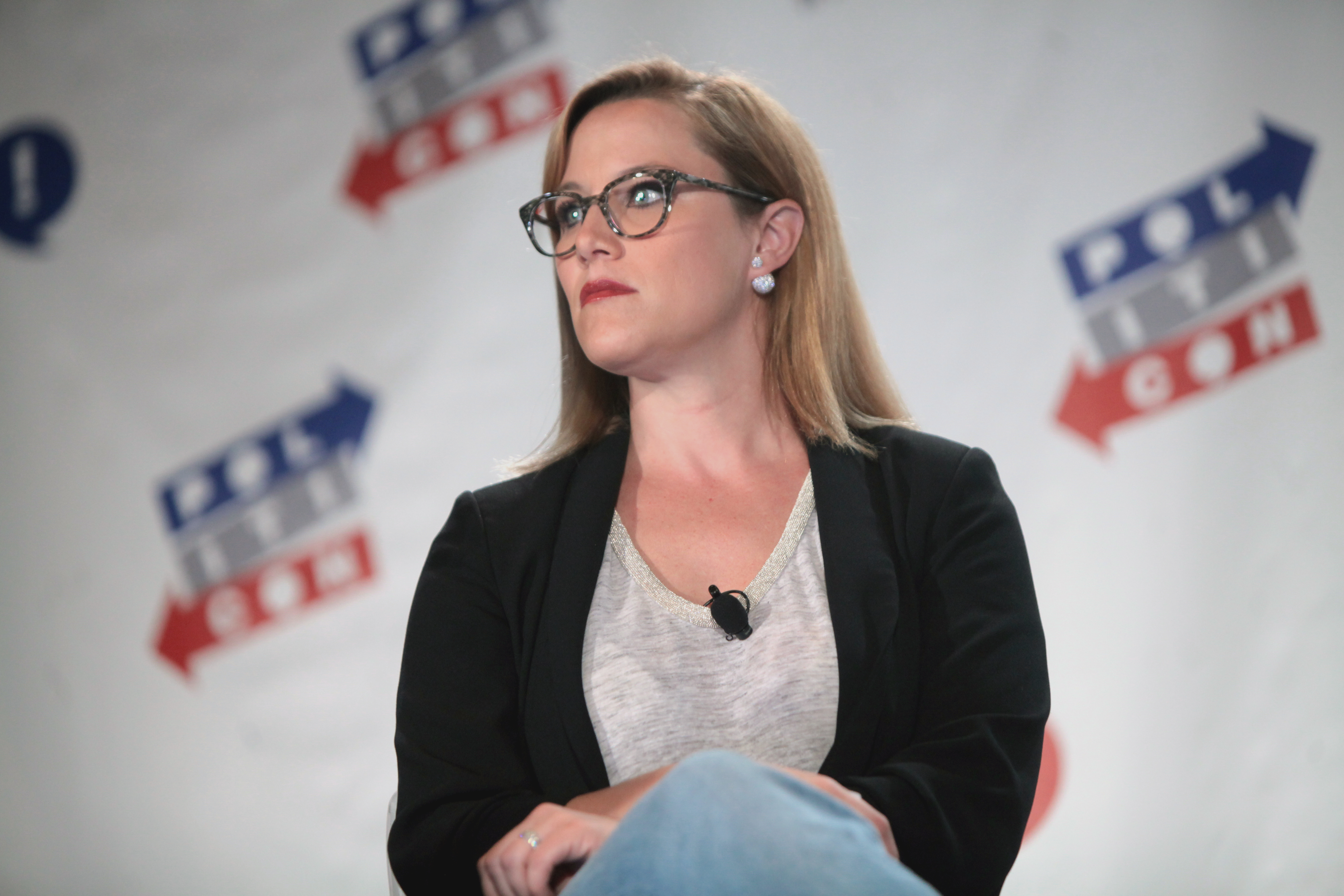
S.E. Cupp, arts and entertainment editor, CNN host, political commentator, and author

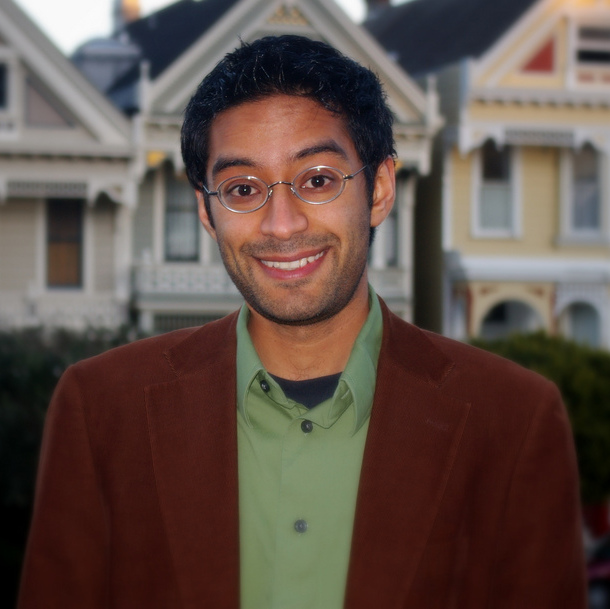
Farhad Manjoo, editor-in-chief in 1999–2000, author and technology writer and opinion columnist, The New York Times

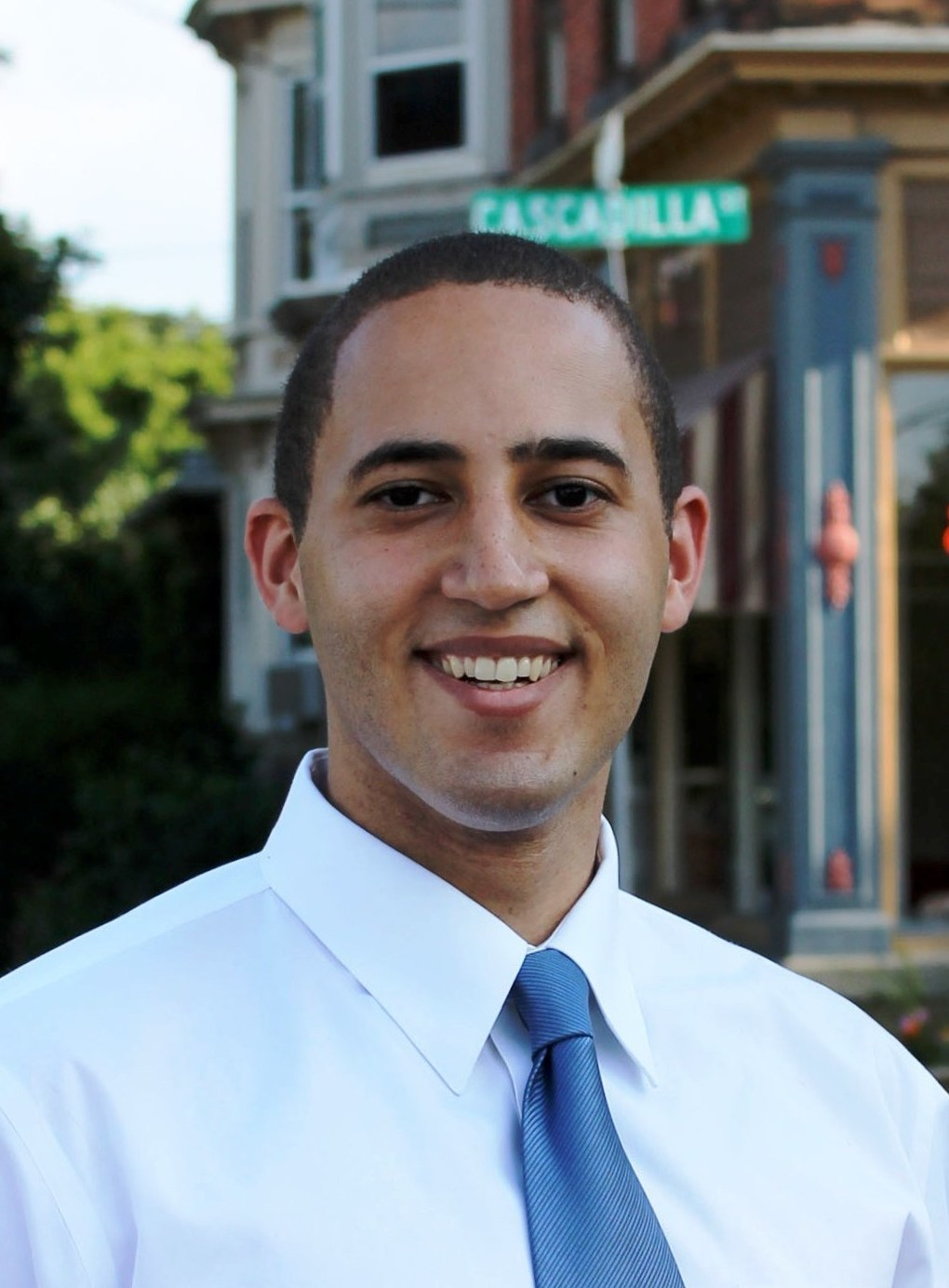
Svante Myrick, editorial board, former mayor of Ithaca, New York

The Cornell Daily Sun claims over a dozen Pulitzer Prize winners and boasts a number of prominent alumni, including:

- Tom Allon, publisher and co-owner, City & State
- Stephen Asprinio, food and wine columnist; restaurateur, sommelier, chef, and former Top Chef contestant
- Jim Axelrod, sports journalist; chief investigative journalist, CBS News
- Whitney Balliett, film critic; book reviewer and jazz critic, The New Yorker
- Victor Berlin, Business Board; information security expert and founder, University of the Potomac and University of Fairfax
- Neil Best, sports journalist, Newsday
- Keri Blakinger, copy editor; criminal justice author and journalist, The Marshall Project
- Jay Branegan, senior editor (1971–72); 1976 Pulitzer Prize-winning journalist with the Chicago Tribune
- Dick Brass, associate editor (1971–72); technology investor, executive, and pioneer who developed first electronic dictionary and thesaurus, ClearType, and Open eBook
- Gordon G. Chang, editorial board; lawyer, author, and television pundit
- S. E. Cupp, arts and entertainment editor; CNN host, political commentator, and author
- Allison Danzig, author and sportswriter, The New York Times
- Charles Divine, news editor; poet and playwright
- Edward D. Eddy, editor-in-chief (1943–44); president, Chatham College and University of Rhode Island
- Bob Filner, Business Board; former mayor of San Diego and U.S. Congressman
- Rob Fishman, columnist; entrepreneur and writer
- David Folkenflik, editor-in-chief (1990–91); NPR media correspondent
- Frank Gannett, Sun Board; media mogul and founder, Gannett
- Jeffrey Gettleman, photographer; 2012 Pulitzer Prize-winning journalist and East Africa Bureau Chief, The New York Times
- Joey Green, political cartoonist; former contributing editor, National Lampoon, author of over 60 books
- Daniel Gross, News Board; financial and economic journalist and executive editor, strategy+business magazine
- Lewis Henry, editor-in-chief (1908–09); former U.S. Congressman
- Marvin Josephson, managing editor (1948–49); founder, chair, and CEO, ICM Partners
- Lawrence Kasanoff, business manager; film and television producer, co-founder of Lightstorm Entertainment and Threshold Entertainment with James Cameron
- Neeraj Khemlani, editor-in-chief (1991–92); former president, CBS News and CBS News and Stations
- Andrew Kopkind, editor-in-chief (1956–57); journalist, The Washington Post, The New Republic, and others
- Marc Lacey, editor-in-chief (1986–87); managing editor, The New York Times and two-time Pulitzer Prize winner at the Los Angeles Times
- Carl Leubsdorf, associate editor (1958–59); Washington columnist, The Dallas Morning News
- Harold O. Levy, columnist; former New York City Schools Chancellor and former executive director, Jack Kent Cooke Foundation
- Eric Lichtblau, news reporter; Washington bureau reporter, The New York Times and 2006 Pulitzer Prize recipient
- Stuart Loory, editor-in-chief (1953–54); academic and managing editor, Chicago Sun-Times
- Farhad Manjoo, editor-in-chief (1999–2000); author and technology journalist and opinion writer, The New York Times
- Joseph Masci, supplement editor; physician, educator, and author
- Will Maslow, associate editor; lawyer and civil rights leader
- Oscar G. Mayer Jr., business manager (1933–34); former chairman, Oscar Mayer
- James C. McKinley Jr., journalist, The New York Times
- Anne Morrissy Merick, sports editor; Vietnam War journalist
- Philip Merrill, managing editor (1954–55); diplomat, banker, and philanthropist and Export-Import Bank of the United States chairman
- Andrew Morse, editor-in-chief (1995–96); former executive vice president, CNN
- Svante Myrick, editorial board; former mayor of Ithaca, New York
- George Jean Nathan, editorial board; drama critic, editor, and co-founder, The American Mercury
- Scot J. Paltrow, News Board; financial journalist
- Paul A. Rahe, associate editor; historian, writer and professor of history
- Jon Ralston, Sports Department; journalist, political commentator, and talk show host
- Henry S. Reuss, editor-in-chief (1932–33); former U.S. Congressman
- Sam Roberts, managing editor (1967–68); reporter, columnist, and editor, The New York Times and biographer of David Greenglass and Nelson Rockefeller
- Howard A. Rodman, editor-in-chief (1970–71); screenwriter and professor
- Wallace A. Ross, News Board; advertising executive and founder, Clio Awards
- Kirkpatrick Sale, editor-in-chief (1957–58); environmental and technology scholar and author and leader of secessionist movement
- Dick Schaap, editor-in-chief (1954–55); sports writer and broadcaster
- Jeremy Schaap, sports editor (1990–91); ESPN contributor and son of Dick Schaap
- Richard Schechner, news editor (1955), theatre reviewer (1956); author, editor, theatre director, professor, New York University Tisch School of the Arts
- Danny Schechter, television producer, filmmaker, and media critic
- Melville Shavelson, humor columnist (1936–37); film director, producer, screenwriter, author
- Alan Sisitsky, former member, Massachusetts House of Representatives and Massachusetts Senate
- Deborah Solomon, associate editor; magazine columnist, article critic, and biographer, The New York Times Magazine
- Barry S. Strauss, feature editor (1973–74); history and classics professor, Cornell University and ancient military history author
- Elmer E. Studley, editorial board; former U.S. Congressman
- Jacob Sullum, senior editor; syndicated newspaper columnist
- Molly O'Toole, news editor (2009); inaugural recipient of the 2020 Pulitzer Prize for audio reporting
- Ronald Thwaites, editor-in-chief (1966–1967); former Jamaica Minister of Education
- Elbert Tuttle, editor-in-chief (1917–18); Chief Judge, United States Court of Appeals for the Fifth Circuit
- Jamie Weinstein, columnist; political journalist and commentator
- David Wild, arts editor; TV and music writer and critic, Rolling Stone
- Kurt Vonnegut, associate editor (1942–43); novelist and satirist
- E. B. White, editor-in-chief (1920–21); columnist and author, Charlotte's Web, Stuart Little, The Trumpet of the Swan, co-author, The Elements of Style, and 1978 Pulitzer Prize special award recipient

Other prominent Cornellians have written letters to the editor, including future U.S. Supreme Court Justice Ruth Bader Ginsburg, who responded to an op-ed on wiretapping written by Cornell Law School students with a letter to the editor in 1953.

== See also ==
- Cornell University
- List of college newspapers
