= Farhad Manjoo =

American journalist and author

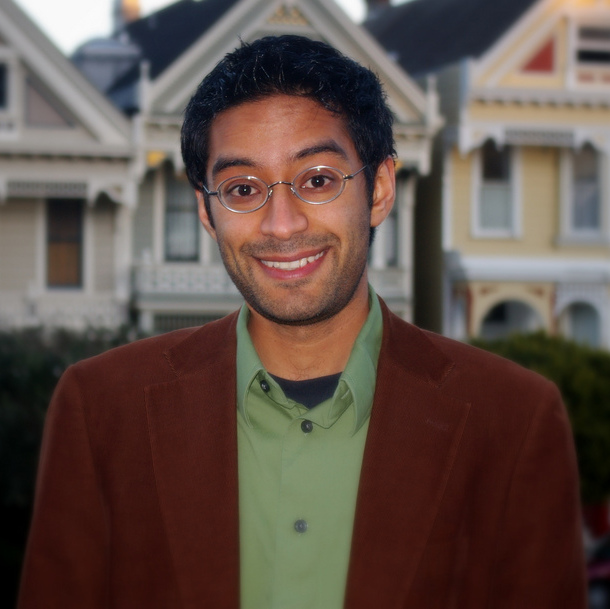
- Manjoo in 2008
- Born: 1978 (age 47–48); South Africa
- Education: Cornell University
- Occupations: Journalist, author
- Writing career
- Language: English

Farhad Manjoo (born 1978) is an American journalist. Manjoo was a staff writer for Slate magazine from 2008 to September 2013, when they (Note: Manjoo prefers to be referred to by they pronouns) left to join The Wall Street Journal. In January 2014, they joined The New York Times, replacing David Pogue as the technology columnist, then became an opinion columnist at the paper from 2018 to 2023. They have also been a contributor to National Public Radio since 2009.

== Early life and education ==
Manjoo was born in South Africa in 1978 to a family with ancestral roots in India. The family left South Africa when Manjoo was eight years old, and moved to Southern California. Manjoo graduated from Cornell University in 2000. As an undergraduate, Manjoo served as writer and editor-in-chief of The Cornell Daily Sun student newspaper.

They were self-described in The New York Times as a "stereotypical, cisgender, middle-aged suburban dad," and said in 2019 that they prefer to be referred to with singular they pronouns. Manjoo publicly disclosed their struggle with esophageal achalasia in 2019.

== Career ==
Manjoo wrote for Wired News before taking a staff position at Salon.com. In July 2008, they accepted a job at Slate magazine writing a twice-weekly technology column. In September 2013, they joined The Wall Street Journal as a technology columnist; their final column for Slate, urging men to wear makeup, was published on September 20. They moved to The New York Times in 2014, and left in 2023.

Manjoo has written about technology, new media, politics, and controversies in journalism.

They are the author of the book True Enough: Learning to Live in a Post-Fact Society.

They shared the 2018 Gerald Loeb Award for Breaking News for the story "Ouster at Uber."

In March 2018, they published a column in the Times about a personal experiment in getting most of their news from print sources for two months. The piece drew criticism from the Columbia Journalism Review and the Nieman Foundation for Journalism for the article's assertion Manjoo had "unplugged from Twitter" for this period when in fact they continued to use the social media service every day. Manjoo felt the piece was sufficiently clear that they made exceptions to their "unplugged" policy, and The New York Times stood by the piece. WNYC's On the Media removed a segment with Manjoo discussing the experiment.

In April 2021, their column "Let's Quit Fetishizing the Single-Family Home" was used for the Abitur high school leaving exams in the German state of North Rhine-Westphalia.

From April to the end of 2024 Manjoo returned to Slate with r/Farhad, a occasional column about interesting things they read on Reddit.
