= Star-Gazette =

Newspaper in Elmira, New York

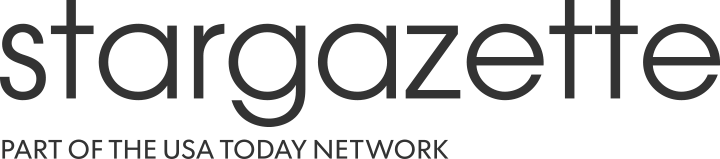

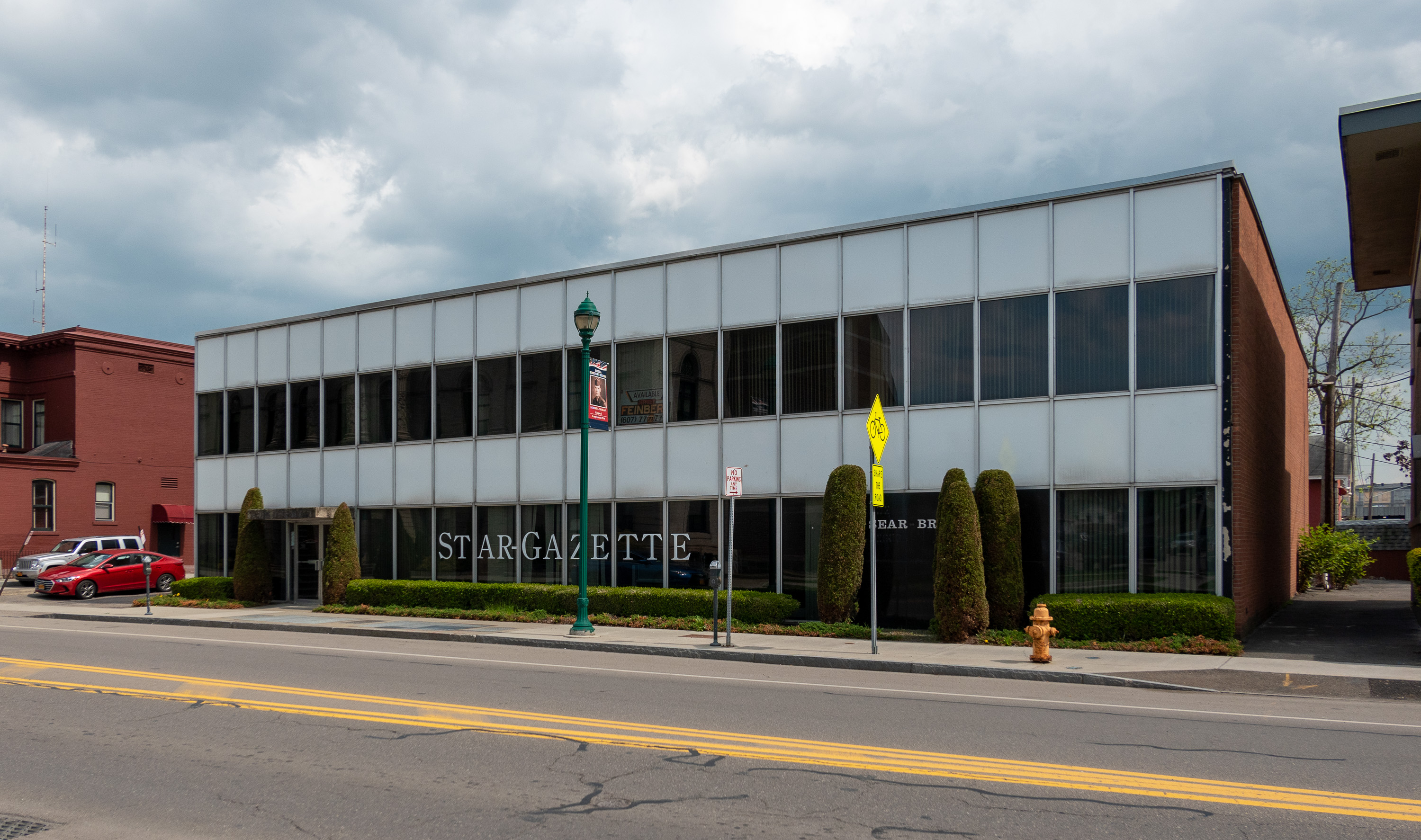
- Building at 310 East Church Street
- Type: Daily newspaper
- Owner: USA Today Co.
- Publisher: George Troyano
- Editor: Neill Borowski
- Founded: 1828; 198 years ago
- Headquarters: 310 East Church Street; Elmira, New York 14901; United States
- Circulation: 13,400 Daily (as of 2017)
- OCLC number: 10766825
- Website: stargazette.com

The Star-Gazette is the major newspaper for Elmira, New York. Based in Elmira, the publication is owned by USA Today Co.

== History ==
The Star-Gazette was the first newspaper of the now massive Gannett conglomerate. It was founded as the weekly Elmira Gazette in 1828 and became an evening daily in 1856. Frank Gannett bought a half-interest in the newspaper in 1906 to begin what would eventually be Gannett Co., Inc. The following year, he merged the Elmira Gazette with a competitor, the Evening Star, to form the Star-Gazette. In 1923, Gannett bought two other competitors in the city: the morning Daily Advertiser and the Sunday Telegram. The Star-Gazette and Advertiser combined as a single all-day newspaper in 1963. The Star-Gazette became a morning publication in 1982. The Telegram nameplate was dropped from the Sunday edition in 1985.
