= Frank Gannett =

American publisher, founder of Gannett Company (1876–1957)

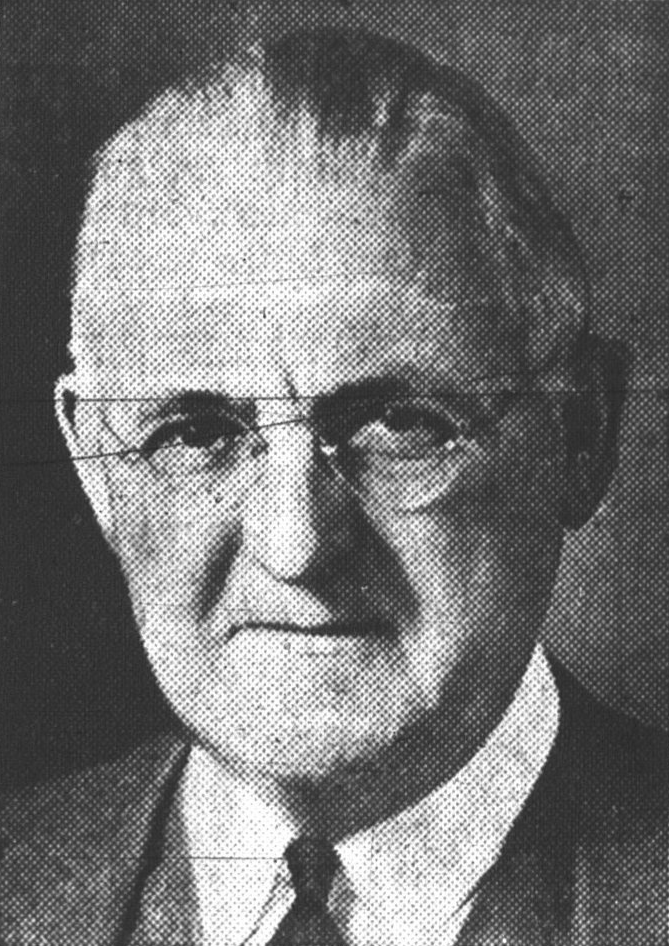
- Gannett in 1940
- Born: Frank Ernest Gannett; 15 September 1876; Bristol, New York, U.S.
- Died: 3 December 1957 (aged 81); Rochester, New York, U.S.
- Education: Cornell University (BA)
- Occupation: Publisher
- Known for: Founded the media corporation Gannett Company
- Spouse: Caroline Werner (m. 1920)

Frank Ernest Gannett (September 15, 1876 – December 3, 1957) was an American publisher who founded the media corporation Gannett Company. He began his career in 1906 as half owner of the Elmira Gazette. He soon added newspapers in Ithaca, Rochester, Utica, and other cities in Upstate New York. At the time of his death, the chain included twenty-two daily newspapers, four radio stations, and three television stations, largely based in the state of New York.

Gannett was known for granting editorial autonomy to the different media, while consolidating and standardizing business procedures and purchases. Gannett disliked sensationalism, so his media played down crime and scandal, and rejected advertising for liquor.

A conservative Republican, he was active in state and national politics. He was the unsuccessful Republican candidate for governor of New York in 1936, and in 1942 was assistant chairman of the Republican National Committee. In 1935, he established the Gannett Foundation to own the business, and provide philanthropy.

== Early life and education ==
Gannett was born in Bristol, New York, on September 15, 1876, to Charles and Maria Gannett. Gannett was one of four children and was raised in South Bristol, New York, by parents struggling to make ends meet first as farmers and later as hotel owners. Gannett's interest in the newspaper business began as a child, when he was a newspaper delivery boy for the Democrat and Chronicle. This job provided Gannett with money to buy his own clothes as well as some pocket money.

After graduating from Bolivar High School in 1893, Gannett took a year off from schooling to raise enough money to further his education. During his break, Gannett also took a competitive exam for a scholarship. Gannett was awarded the scholarship and began his college career at Cornell University. He was closely associated with Rochester's Unitarian Church.

Frank entered Cornell as part of the class of 1898 with $80 to his name. At Cornell, Gannett held five jobs and studied a variety of subjects. Since schools of journalism did not exist at the time, Gannett took courses in literature, history, civil and criminal law, government, Greek, and Latin. At the end of his freshman year, Gannett was elected as his class' correspondent for the school's newspaper, The Cornell Daily Sun. Gannett held this post for one year until he acquired a paying job as a campus reporter for The Ithaca Journal. Soon after, he began selling reports to other newspapers as well. A quickly increasing demand led to Gannett hiring a group of students to help. Throughout his college career, Gannett worked for various magazines and newspapers. Gannett's time at Cornell was a successful one, leaving school with a B.A. degree and $1,000 as well.

== Career ==
In the summer of 1898, Gannett joined the Syracuse Herald news staff, and quickly decided to forgo this job in favor of returning to Cornell University for his master's degree. Upon his return, Gannett was bombarded with requests for his news about Cornell from the newspapers clients he had served as an undergraduate. Gannett became so busy meeting these demands that he never found time to register for graduate classes that fall. He returned to Cornell University the following year determined to complete his graduate degree, but did not stay long. In the early weeks of 1899, Gannett was offered the secretarial position for William McKinley's Commission to visit the Philippines, and by March he arrived in Manila. Gannett stayed in the Philippines for a year, learning of foreign politics and culture. Upon his return, he accepted a job as city editor for the Ithaca News. He also became editor of the Pittsburg Index in 1905.

In 1906, Gannett became half owner of the daily newspaper the Elmira Gazette. Within the year, Gannett merged the Elmira Gazette and Elmira Star forming the Elmira Star-Gazette, which is still in circulation. Throughout his career, Gannett was known as "The Great Hyphenator". The media magnate was known to buy and merge money-losing dailies to create profit. Six years later, in 1912 the partners also purchased the Ithaca Journal. Gannett left Elmira in 1918, when he and his partner, Erwin Davenport turned their sights to Rochester, New York where a "politico-journalistic dog fight" between three evening newspapers caught their eye. Gannett and his partner sought to buy The Union and Advertiser and the Times, but they required $250,000 in cash. The two partners raised the money through friends and bank loans. Once purchased, the newspapers were merged into the Rochester Times-Union.

Gannett moved his headquarters to Rochester, New York, to supervise the news end of his newly acquired newspaper. The company's headquarters remained in Rochester until 1986, when it was relocated to Arlington County, Virginia. Gannett and Davenport lived in a hotel walking distance from their offices. Gannett spent his time tracking down news while Davenport searched for advertisers. While in Rochester, Gannett met his wife, Caroline Werner; they married in March 1920. By 1922, Gannett and Davenport were seeing signs of success. The Times-Union had downed its competition, the Post-Express, and was beginning to turn a profit. This success, though, did not anticipate the arrival of fellow newspaper businessman William Randolph Hearst.

=== William Randolph Hearst rivalry ===
William Randolph Hearst, another media magnate of the time, is often portrayed as Gannett's rival. The pair's rivalry came to head particularly in the 1920s. Up until that point, Rochester had been monopolized by the Gannett Corporation while the Albany newspapers were mostly under the control of Hearst. This changed in 1922, when William Randolph Hearst attempted to break into the Rochester newspaper business. This proved to be highly unsuccessful, as it was reported that Hearst began losing $100,000 a year. To combat Hearst's entrance to the Rochester newspaper business, Gannett brought the Knickerbocker Press and Albany Evening News in 1928. The Knickerbocker Press was circulated in the morning while the Albany Evening News was circulated in the evening and was a direct competitor of Albany Times Union, Hearst's newspaper. By 1937, Gannett monopolized not only the Rochester newspaper business but the Albany one as well. It was at this time that Hearst and Gannett struck a deal. William Randolph Hearst pulled out of Rochester, where at one point he was bribing citizens with new cars in order to attract new customers. In exchange Gannett consolidated the Knickerbocker Press and Albany Evening News into a single evening newspaper called the Knickerbocker Press. Hearst then transferred the Times Union to the morning field unopposed. The deal left Hearst disappointed yet feeling wiser and sounder. Hearst felt "sounder because he was putting his financial house in order all along the line and had just concluded a constructive deal in Rochester and Albany, N. Y."

Ever the businessman, Hearst continuously offered to buy the Times-Union from Gannett, Davenport, and their friend Woodard J. Copeland. By 1923, this seemed to be an appealing deal to Davenport and Copeland, as both were in poor health. If the two went through with the deal, it would ultimately leave Gannett out in the cold. So he decided to make his friends an offer they could not refuse. If given enough time to raise $250,000, Gannett would buy both of their stakes in the Times-Union, making him the sole owner. In order to obtain these funds, Gannett formed a new corporation, Gannett Co., Inc. So, at age 48, Frank Gannett became the owner of six newspapers in five upstate New York cities. In 1928, Gannett purchased the Rochester Democrat and Chronicle, the paper for which he first worked as a paperboy.

=== Political involvement ===
Throughout his life, Gannett was active in politics. A majority of Gannett's newspapers were in solid Republican territory. Gannett always sent his pronouncements to his editors with a note, "For your information and use, if desired", and editors were free to ignore them. Gannett backed Franklin D. Roosevelt during his early years of his presidency but by the late 1930s withdrew his support. Gannett, amongst others, took a publicly neutral stand to the New Deal in 1936, though he privately disapproved of it, and actively campaigned against it later in the decade. He was a founding member of the National Committee to Uphold Constitutional Government and organized opposition to President Roosevelt's court-packing scheme of 1937, as well as the bulk of Roosevelt's proposed responses to the 1937 recession. Frank Gannett briefly ran for the 1940 Republican presidential nomination, but lost to Wendell Willkie.

=== Gannett growth ===
Gannett spent the rest of his life tirelessly working to build his corporation. He expanded his company to include both TV and radio stations. Though he never founded a paper, he "bought with an auditor's sure eye; in all, Publisher Gannett acquired 30 papers (plus a string of TV and radio stations) in 51 years, merged ten, and unloaded only three." Gannett was able to acquire more papers than any other American publisher has without the help of an inheritance. Though he suffered from diabetes, the publisher refused to slow down.

In 1948, when Gannett suffered from a stroke, he slowed down. Due to a spinal fracture in 1955, Gannett transferred management duties and the presidency of Gannett Co. to Paul Miller.

== Death ==
Gannett died on December 3, 1957, of complications suffered from a fall the previous April.

== Legacy ==
Gannett, who started off with virtually nothing, built an empire that continues on to this day. His obituary in Time magazine read that "Gannett, 81, [was a] publisher-founder of an empire that includes 22 newspapers, four radio and three TV stations." Gannett is buried in historic Mt. Hope Cemetery in Rochester, New York.

The Gannett Corporation remains a major media empire and holding company to this day. The company has 92 daily newspapers in circulation today in the United States, including USA Today, which has the fourth highest print circulation in the country. Gannett Corporation newspapers reach 11.6 million readers every weekday and 12 million every Sunday. By 2012, the company also owned 23 TV stations that reached 21 million households, roughly 18 percent of the United States population. On June 29, 2015, Gannett changed its name to Tegna after spinning off its publishing business into a new company called Gannett.

The libraries at Elmira College, Utica University, and Ithaca College are named for him, as was the student health center at Cornell University from 1956 to 2017 and the building that houses the printing and photography programs at Rochester Institute of Technology. The Frank E. Gannett Field House at Wilson College in Chambersburg, Pennsylvania is named after him.

== Awards ==
In 1939, he received an honorary Doctor of Laws degree from Oglethorpe University and an honor Doctor of Letters degree from Keuka College.
