= William Neikirk =

American journalist (1938–2020)

William R. Neikirk
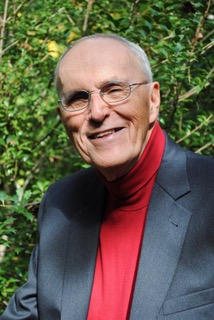
- Neikirk in 2015
- Born: January 6, 1938; Irvine, Kentucky, U.S.
- Died: August 27, 2020 (aged 82); Arlington, Virginia, U.S.
- Education: University of Kentucky (BA)
- Occupation: Journalist
- Spouse: Ruth Ann (Clary) Neikirk
- Children: 3

William Robert Neikirk (January 6, 1938 – August 27, 2020) was an American journalist, editor, and author. He spent 48 years as a reporter and served as White House correspondent for the Chicago Tribune during the Clinton administration.

== Early life and education ==
Neikirk was born on January 6, 1938, in Irvine, Kentucky, to parents Lewis Byron Neikirk and Nancy Elizabeth (Green) Neikirk. He earned a Bachelor of Arts in journalism from the University of Kentucky in 1960.

== Career ==
Neikirk began his career in 1959, as a part-time sports reporter for the Lexington Herald. He would join the Associated Press in 1961, working first in Louisville, Kentucky, then Lexington, and then in Frankfort as state capital correspondent. He would then move to AP's Baton Rouge, Louisiana, bureau in 1966 to cover civil rights and regional issues. Neikirk was transferred to the AP Washington bureau in 1969 to cover U.S. economic policy. Neikirk joined the Chicago Tribune Washington bureau in 1974 to cover U.S. and international economics, serving two stints as White House correspondent. He returned to Chicago in 1988, to serve as associate managing editor for financial news. Neikirk was the Chief Washington correspondent for the Chicago Tribune from 1998 to 2008.

Neikirk appeared frequently on CNN, C-SPAN, and other nationally televised public affairs programs. He wrote nationally syndicated column on economics for the Chicago Tribune, 1980–1994. and served as news editor of the Chicago Tribune Washington bureau, from 1983 to 1988. He retired from the Chicago Tribune in 2008.

== Death ==
Neikirk had dementia and died from COVID-19 at his home in Arlington, Virginia, on August 27, 2020, at age 82, during the COVID-19 pandemic in Virginia.

== Awards ==
- Society of American Business Editors and Writers Award, 1978.
- John Hancock Award for Excellence in Business Writing, 1979, for series, "The Changing American Worker," in the Chicago Tribune.
- Gerald Loeb Award for distinguished business and financial journalism, for series, "The Changing American Worker," in the Chicago Tribune.
- Runner-up for the Pulitzer Prize for series on the impact of world trade, 1979.
- Amos Tuck Graduate School of Business award for business writing, Dartmouth College, 1980.
- Raymond Clapper Memorial Award (Second Place), 1982, for series on Rearming America, Chicago Tribune.
- Merriman Smith Memorial Award for presidential reporting, 1995.
- Inducted into Kentucky Journalism Hall of Fame, 1998.
- Named a distinguished alumnus, University of Kentucky School of Journalism and Media, 2018.

== Memberships ==
- President, The Gridiron Club, prestigious organization of journalists, Washington, 2007.
- Member, White House Correspondents' Association, 1971–2008.
- Member, National Press Club, Washington, 1971–2020.

== Works ==
- Neikirk, William (Fall 1991). "Needed Commitment - More Resources Are Required to Tell the Economic Story in a Dramatic and Readable Way" (PDF). Nieman Reports. XLV (3): 3–5.
- Neikirk, William (February 21, 1993). "New Industrial Revolution Hits U.S. Big Business". Chicago Tribune.
- Garfield Schwartz, Gail; Neikirk, William (1983). The Work Revolution: How High-Tech Is Sweeping Away Old Jobs and Industries and Creating New Ones in New Places. New York: Rawson Associates. ISBN 9780892562510. OCLC 1029389109.
- Neikirk, William (1987). Volcker: A Portrait of the Money Man. New York: Congdon & Weed. ISBN 9780865531789. OCLC 17233251.
- Neikirk, William (2015). The Copperhead Club. Arlington, Virginia: William Neikirk. ISBN 9780996962407.
