= Ed Henry =

American television reporter and correspondent

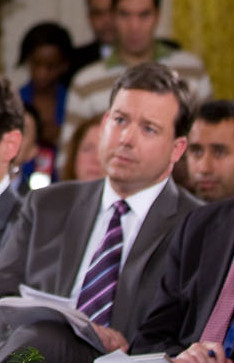
- Henry in 2010
- Born: Edward Henry; July 20, 1971 (age 55); New York City, New York, US
- Education: Siena College
- Occupation: Television reporter
- Years active: 2004–present
- Spouse: Shirley Hung (m. 2010)
- Children: 2

Edward Michael Henry Jr. (born July 20, 1971) is an American journalist. Henry was the co-host of America's Newsroom on the Fox News Channel, along with Sandra Smith. On June 20, 2011, he left CNN, to become the Fox News White House Correspondent. On July 1, 2020, he was fired after an investigation by the network into allegations of sexual misconduct, which he contests.

== Early life and education ==
Henry was born July 20, 1971, in the Astoria neighborhood of the borough of Queens, New York City, New York, the son of a dairy-manager father and a bookkeeper mother. He attended St. Joseph's Grammar School until the family moved to Deer Park, New York, on Long Island. He then attended St. John the Baptist Diocesan High School, in nearby West Islip. He graduated with a bachelor's degree in English from Siena College in Loudonville, New York. He began his career with Jack Anderson.

== Career ==
In 2003, he began providing political analysis for the WMAL Morning News and The Chris Core Show, two local radio shows on WMAL, Washington, D.C.

He covered Capitol Hill for Roll Call for eight years, writing that newspaper's "Heard on the Hill" column, and has been a contributing editor at Washingtonian. He was a 2011–12 member of the board of associate trustees at Siena College, his alma mater.

Henry was the moderator of CNN's Inside Politics. After covering the White House for CNN since March 2006, Henry became CNN's senior White House correspondent in December 2008.

=== Fox News ===
On June 20, 2011, it was announced that Henry was leaving CNN to become the Chief White House Correspondent for Fox News Channel. CNN insiders said that network management had already told Henry that his contract would not be renewed. In 2012, Henry said he had no regrets about leaving CNN. He also worked as one of the hosts of Fox and Friends Weekend and as the chief national correspondent. He last worked as the co-host of the TV show America's Newsroom, along with Sandra Smith. In 2016, Henry was suspended for four months after media reports revealed his affair with a Las Vegas cocktail hostess.

On June 25, 2020, Fox News suspended Henry following an allegation of sexual misconduct. After investigating the incident, the network fired Henry on July 1. In an internal memo announcing the firing, Fox News commented that the network "strictly prohibits sexual harassment, misconduct, and discrimination". Henry denied the allegation, and his lawyer said he remains confident of his eventual vindication. A federal lawsuit alleged Henry raped a woman he had "groomed" and "coerced" into having a sexual relationship when she did not comply. The lawsuit, filed by Douglas Wigdor and Michael Willemin on behalf of Jennifer Eckhart and Cathy Areu, also alleges Fox News supported and promoted Henry after receiving complaints of sexually inappropriate behavior and only fired him earlier in [July 2020] because they were aware of an impending lawsuit. The lawsuit alleges Henry sexually harassed both women and raped Eckhart.

=== After Fox News ===
Ed Henry co-hosted the weekday morning show American Sunrise on Real America's Voice. Henry and his co-host, Karyn Turk were abruptly taken off the show in 2023 and Henry was later hired by Newsmax TV.

== Awards ==
Henry received the 2005 Everett McKinley Dirksen Award for Distinguished Reporting of Congress from the National Press Foundation. Henry provided breaking news coverage for CNN's America Votes 2004, as well as an exclusive March 2005 interview with Jeb Bush about the Florida governor's inability to intercede for Terri Schiavo. The NPF judges stated:

Ed submitted five clips that took the story out of the committee room and into the living room. When reporting about Senator [Bill] Frist's support of stem cell research, he studied the Senator’s motivations not only from a political standpoint, but also as a scientist. It was a great piece of journalism that may have given us our first glimpse of Frist as his own man running for President.

In 2008, the White House Correspondents' Association presented Henry with the Merriman Smith Award (in the broadcast category) for presidential reporting under deadline pressure. Henry won for his February 14, 2007, news coverage of the Bush administration's irreconcilable assertions that Iranian officials were behind the authorization to send improvised explosive devices to Iraq. The panel of judges wrote that Henry's reports on CNN "got better with each ensuing update throughout the day".

== Personal life ==
Henry married Shirley Hung, a CNN senior producer, in June 2010 in Las Vegas. The couple has two children.

In 2019, Henry donated a part of his liver to save his sister, Colleen (born May 1973), who had been diagnosed with liver failure.

Media offices
Preceded by John King	CNN Senior White House Correspondent; 2005 – 2011	Succeeded by Jessica Yellin
Preceded by Major Garrett	Fox News Channel Senior White House Correspondent; 2011 – 2016	Succeeded by Kevin Corke
New title	Fox News Channel Chief National Correspondent; 2016 – 2020	Incumbent
