= White House Correspondents' Association =

Organization covering the US executive branch

WHCA
- White House Correspondents' Association
- Abbreviation: WHCA
- Formation: February 25, 1914; 112 years ago
- Tax ID no.: 52-0799067
- Legal status: 501(c)(3) nonprofit organization
- Location: Washington, D.C.
- Coordinates: 38°53′52″N 77°03′18″W
- President: Weijia Jiang (CBS News)
- Executive Director: Steven Thomma
- Revenue: $366,481 (2015)
- Expenses: $311,090 (2015)
- Employees: 0 (2015)
- Website: whca.press

The White House Correspondents' Association (WHCA) is an organization of journalists who cover the White House and the president of the United States. The WHCA was founded on February 25, 1914, by journalists in response to an unfounded rumor that a United States congressional committee would select which journalists could attend press conferences of President Woodrow Wilson.

The WHCA operates independently of the White House. Application for membership is made online and granted by the association on the basis of criteria. Historically, notable issues handled by the WHCA were the credentialing process, access to the president and physical conditions in the White House press briefing rooms. Its most high-profile activity is the annual White House Correspondents' Dinner, which is traditionally attended by the president and covered by the news media.

In February 2025, the White House announced that the WHCA would no longer determine which outlets are allowed access to the president.

== Association leadership ==
The leadership of the White House Correspondents' Association for 2025–26 includes:

- Officers
  - President: Weijia Jiang, CBS News
  - Vice President: Justin Sink, Bloomberg News
  - Treasurer: Jacqui Heinrich, Fox News
  - Secretary: Brian Bennett, Time
- Board members
  - Sara Cook, CBS News
  - Andrew Harnik, Getty Images
  - Trevor Hunnicutt, Reuters
  - Courtney Subramanian, Bloomberg News
  - Karen Travers, ABC News
- Executive Director
  - Steven Thomma

== Association presidents ==
Year	Name	Employer
1914–20	William Wallace Price	The Washington Star
1921–22	Frank R. Lamb	The Washington Star
1922–23	J. Russell Young	The Washington Star
1923–24	E. Ross Bartley	Associated Press
1924–25	Isaac Gregg	The Sun
1925–26	George E. Durno	International News Service
1926–27	John Edwin Nevin	The Washington Post
1927–28	John T. Lambert	Universal Service
1928–29	J. Russell Young	The Washington Star
1929–30	Wilbur Forrest	New York Herald Tribune
1930–31	Lewis Wood	The New York Times
1931–33	Paul R. Mallon	syndicated columnist
1933–34	George E. Durno	International News Service
1934–35	Francis M. Stephenson	Associated Press
1935–36	Albert J. Warner	New York Herald Tribune
1936–37	Frederick J. Storm	United Press Associations
1937–38	Walter J. Trohan	Chicago Tribune
1938–40	Earl Godwin	The Washington Times
1940	Felix Belair Jr.	The New York Times
1940–41	Thomas F. Reynolds	United Press Associations
1941–42	John C. O'Brien	The Philadelphia Inquirer
1942	John C. Henry	The Washington Star
1942–43	Douglas B. Cornell	Associated Press
1943–44	Paul Wooten	The Times-Picayune
1944–45	Merriman Smith	United Press Associations
1946–47	Edward T. Folliard	The Washington Post
1947–48	Felix Belair Jr.	The New York Times
1948–49	Ernest B. ("Tony") Vaccaro	Associated Press
1949–50	Robert G. Nixon	International News Service
1950–53	Carlton Kent	Chicago Sun-Times
1953–54	Robert J. Donovan	New York Herald Tribune
1954–55	Anthony H. Leviero	The New York Times
1955–56	Laurence H. Burd	Chicago Tribune
1956–58	Francis M. Stephenson	Daily News
1958–59	Marvin Arrowsmith	Associated Press
1959–61	Garnett D. Horner	The Washington Star
1961–62	William H.Y. Knighton Jr.	The Baltimore Sun
1962–63	Robert Roth	Philadelphia Bulletin
1963–64	Merriman Smith	United Press International
1964–66	Alan L. Otten	The Wall Street Journal
1966–67	Robert E. Thompson	Hearst Newspapers
1967–68	Frank Cormier	Associated Press
1968–69	Carroll Kilpatrick	The Washington Post
1969–70	Charles W. Bailey II	Minneapolis Tribune
1970–71	Peter Lisagor	Chicago Daily News
1971–72	John P. Sutherland	U.S. News & World Report
1972–73	Edgar A. Poe	The Times-Picayune (New Orleans)
1973–74	Ted Knap	Scripps Howard Newspapers
1974–75	James Deakin	St. Louis Post-Dispatch
1976–77	Lawrence M. O'Rourke	Philadelphia Bulletin
1977–78	Paul F. Healy	Daily News
1978–79	Aldo Beckman	Chicago Tribune
1979–80	Ralph Harris	Reuters
1980–81	Robert C. Pierpoint	CBS News
1981–82	Clifford Evans	RKO General Broadcasting
1982–83	Thomas M. DeFrank	Newsweek
1983–84	James R. Gerstenzang	Associated Press
1984–85	Sara Fritz	Los Angeles Times
1985–86	Gary F. Schuster	CBS News
1986–87	Bill Plante	CBS News
1987–88	Norman D. Sandler	United Press International
1988–89	Jeremiah O'Leary	The Washington Times
1989–90	Johanna Neuman	USA Today
1990–91	Robert M. Ellison	Sheridan Broadcasting
1991–92	Charles Bierbauer	CNN
1992–93	Karen Hosler	The Baltimore Sun
1993–94	George E. Condon Jr.	Copley News Service
1994–95	Kenneth T. Walsh	U.S. News & World Report
1995–96	Carl P. Leubsdorf	The Dallas Morning News
1996–97	Terence Hunt	Associated Press
1997–98	Laurence McQuillan	Reuters
1998–99	Stewart Powell	Hearst Newspapers
1999–2000	Susan Page	USA Today
2000–01	Arlene Dillon	CBS News
2001–02	Steve Holland	Reuters
2002–03	Bob Deans	Cox Newspapers
2003–04	Carl M. Cannon	National Journal
2004–05	Ron Hutcheson	Knight Ridder
2005–06	Mark Smith	Associated Press TV and Radio
2006–07	Steve Scully	C-SPAN
2007–08	Ann Compton	ABC News
2008–09	Jennifer Loven	Associated Press
2009–10	Edwin Chen	Bloomberg
2010–11	David Jackson	USA Today
2011–12	Caren Bohan	Reuters
2012–13	Ed Henry	Fox News
2013–14	Steven Thomma	McClatchy
2014–15	Christi Parsons	Tribune Media
2015–16	Carol Lee	Wall Street Journal
2016–17	Jeff Mason	Reuters
2017–18	Margaret Talev	Bloomberg
2018–19	Olivier Knox	SiriusXM
2019–20	Jonathan Karl	ABC News
2020–21	Zeke Miller	Associated Press
2021–22	Steven Portnoy	CBS News Radio
2022–23	Tamara Keith	NPR
2023–24	Kelly O'Donnell	NBC News
2024–25	Eugene Daniels	Politico
2025–26	Weijia Jiang	CBS News
2026–27	Justin Sink (elect)	Bloomberg News

== White House press room ==
The White House Correspondents' Association is responsible for assigning the seats and the standing room in the James S. Brady Press Briefing Room in the White House. Even though the press office issues the passes for each session of press briefing, the correspondents' association decides who sits where. The board of directors assigns news sources to certain positions, which change about each 3–4 years.

Most media providers have their own seat, but some share seats with other providers.

The association usually publishes the seating chart on its website every time a new one is decided and comes into effect.

== White House Correspondents' Dinner ==
The association's annual dinner, begun in 1921, has become a Washington, D.C., tradition, and is traditionally attended by the president and vice president of the United States. The dinner is traditionally held on the evening of the last Saturday in April at the Washington Hilton.

== Awards ==
Note: Award years represent the date the work was published/broadcast, which is always one year before the prize was awarded.

=== The Aldo Beckman Memorial Award ===
The Aldo Beckman Award for Journalistic Excellence is an annual award sponsored by the WHCA. Established in 1981, it recognizes "a correspondent who personifies the journalistic excellence and personal qualities of Aldo Beckman" for overall excellence in White House coverage. Described by CBS News as "one of journalism's most prestigious awards", past recipients include David E. Sanger, Mark Knoller, Glenn Thrush, Kenneth T. Walsh, and Carl M. Cannon.

Year	Recipient	Employer	Ref.
1981	Helen Thomas	UPI	
1982	Rich Jaroslovsky	The Wall Street Journal	
1983	Lou Cannon	The Washington Post	
1984	David Hoffman	The Washington Post	
1985	Robert Timberg	The Baltimore Sun	
1986	W. Dale Nelson	Associated Press	
1987	Gerald F. Seib	The Wall Street Journal	
1988			
1989	Ann Devroy	The Washington Post	
1990	Kenneth T. Walsh	U.S. News & World Report	
1991	Timothy J. McNulty	Chicago Tribune	
1992	Thomas DeFrank	Newsweek	
1993	Jeffrey Birnbaum	The Wall Street Journal	
1994	Kathy Lewis	The Dallas Morning News	
1995	John A. Farrell	The Boston Globe	
1996	Todd Purdum	The New York Times	
1997	Michael K. Frisby	The Wall Street Journal	
1998	John Harris	The Washington Post	
1999	Jeanne Cummings	The Wall Street Journal	
2000	Steve Thomma	Knight Ridder	
2001	Anne E. Kornblut	The Boston Globe	
2002	Dana Milbank	The Washington Post	
2003	David Sanger	The New York Times	
2004	Susan Page	USA Today	
2005	Carl Cannon	National Journal	
2006	Kenneth T. Walsh	U.S. News & World Report	
2007	Alexis Simendinger	National Journal	
2008	Michael Abramowitz	The Washington Post	
2009	Mark Knoller	CBS News	
2010	Peter Baker	The New York Times	
2011	Scott Wilson	The Washington Post	
2012	Ryan Lizza	The New Yorker	
2013	Glenn Thrush	Politico	
2013	Brianna Keilar	CNN	
2014	Peter Baker	The New York Times	
2015	Carol Lee	The Wall Street Journal	
2016	Greg Jaffe	The Washington Post	
2017	Maggie Haberman	The New York Times	
2018	McKay Coppins	The Atlantic	
2019	Yamiche Alcindor	PBS NewsHour	
2020	Philip Rucker	The Washington Post	
2021	Jonathan Swan	Axios	
2022	Matt Viser	The Washington Post	
2023	Barak Ravid	Axios	
2024	Alex Thompson	Axios	

=== Award for Excellence in Presidential News Coverage Under Deadline Pressure ===
The award was established in 1970 as the Merriman Smith Memorial Award for outstanding examples of deadline reporting. (Smith died of a self-inflicted gunshot wound in 1970.) The award was renamed in 2022 after the WHCA determined that Smith had supported excluding Black and female journalists from membership in the National Press Club and from attending the White House Correspondents' Dinner.

Year	Recipient	Category	Employer	Article / Show	Notes / Ref.
1970					
1971					
1972					
1973					
1974	Douglas C. Wilson	Print	The Providence Journal	Resignation of President Nixon	
1975	Aldo Beckman	Print	Chicago Tribune	"Sarah Jane Moore's assassination attempt on President Ford"	
1976					
1977	Michael J. Sniffen and Richard E. Meyer	Print	AP	Bert Lance used the same stock as collateral for two different loans.	
1978	Edward Walsh	Print		The Camp David Summit Conference	
1979					
1980	John Palmer	Broadcast	NBC News	"...the failed attempt by President Jimmy Carter's administration to rescue the American hostages in Iran".	
1980	Lars-Erik Nelson and Frank Van Riper	Print	New York Daily News	"deadline coverage of the negotiations to free American hostages held in Iran during the Carter administration".	
1981					
1982					
1983	Staff	Print	Newsweek	"Coverage of the bombing of Marine headquarters in Lebanon"	
1984	David Hoffman	Print	The Washington Post	"President Reagan's blaming a terrorist attack on the U.S. Embassy annex in Beirut on the 'near destruction' of U.S. intelligence during the Carter administration."	
1985					
1986	Owen Ullmann	Print	Knight Ridder	"The Reykjavík Summit"	
1987	Gerald F. Seib	Print	The Wall Street Journal		
1988					
1989	Norman D. Sandler	Print	UPI		
1990	Steve Taylor	Broadcast	Unistar Radio Networks	"President Bush's trip to Saudi Arabia."	
1990	Norman D. Sandler	Print	UPI	"1990 Helsinki summit"	
1991	Susan Page	Print	Newsday	Gulf War	
1992	Peter Maer	Broadcast	Mutual-NBC Radio	Live coverage of President George Bush's collapse at an official dinner in Tokyo	
1992	David Espo	Print	AP	Deadline reporting on Election Day 1992	
1993	Mara Liasson	Broadcast	National Public Radio		
1993	Terrence Hunt	Print	Associated Press		
1994	Mara Liasson	Broadcast	NPR		
1994	William Neikirk	Print	Chicago Tribune		
1995	Mark Knoller	Broadcast	CBS News	"Writing and broadcasting multiple breaking stories ... about a White House intruder."	
1995	Peter Maer	Broadcast	Mutual/NBC Radio	"Outstanding broadcast of President Clinton's attendance at the funeral of the Israeli Prime Minister."	
1995	Susan Cornwell	Print	Reuters America	President Clinton and taxes: "For getting a scoop from an on-the-record presidential speech.... Cornwell's entry was the only one that caused second-day stories (and more) to be written. It not only covered news; it created news."	
1996	Mara Liasson	Broadcast	National Public Radio	"Spot news coverage of the 1996 election campaign"; "she found time to ... deliver an insightful audio portrait of a small California town that President Clinton visited last October."	
1996	Ron Fournier	Print	Associated Press	"An exclusive on President Clinton's new cabinet choices for the second term."	
1997	Peter Maer	Broadcast	NBC Radio/Mutual News	"Evocative radio account of President Clinton's visit to Little Rock Central High School, 40 years after the school was integrated."	
1997	Ron Fournier	Print	Associated Press	"President Clinton's knee injury that sent him to the hospital in the middle of the night."	
1998	Jodi Enda	Print	Knight Ridder	"President Clinton's meeting with survivors of genocide in Rwanda...."	
1999	Gary Nurenberg	Broadcast	KTLA-TV, Tribune Broadcasting	"Monica Lewinsky Deposed"	
1999	Jodi Enda	Print	Knight Ridder Newspapers	"A poignant story about an emotional day in Kosovo."	
2000	Jim Angle	Broadcast	Fox News Channel		
2000	Sandra Sobieraj	Print	Associated Press		
2001	Peter Maer	Broadcast	CBS News		
2001	Ron Fournier	Print	Associated Press		
2002	Jim Angle	Broadcast	Fox News Channel		
2002	David Sanger	Print	The New York Times		
2003	Mike Allen	Print	The Washington Post		
2004	Ron Fournier	Print	Associated Press		
2004	Jackie Calmes	Print	The Wall Street Journal		Honorable Mention
2005	Terry Moran	Broadcast	ABC News		
2005	Deb Riechmann	Print	Associated Press		
2006	Martha Raddatz	Broadcast	ABC News		
2006	David Sanger	Print	The New York Times		
2007	Ed Henry	Broadcast	CNN		
2007	Deb Riechmann	Print	Associated Press		
2008	David Greene	Broadcast	NPR		
2008	Sandra Sobieraj Westfall	Print	People magazine		
2009	Jake Tapper	Broadcast	ABC News		
2009	Ben Feller	Print	Associated Press		
2010	Jake Tapper	Broadcast	ABC News		
2010	Dan Balz	Print	The Washington Post		
2011	Jake Tapper	Broadcast	ABC News	Reporting that "Standard & Poor was on the verge of downgrading America's triple-A credit rating because of concerns over political gridlock in Washington"	
2011	Glenn Thrush, Carrie Budoff Brown, Manu Raju and John Bresnahan	Print	Politico	"The deal between Barack Obama and congressional Republicans to raise the U.S. debt ceiling."	
2012	Terry Moran	Broadcast	ABC News	On-air interpretation of the Supreme Court ruling of Obama's Health Care Reform Law	
2012	Julie Pace	Print	Associated Press	2012 Obama campaign's get-out-the-vote strategy	
2013	Peter Maer	Broadcast	CBS News	"Sequestration"	
2013	Peter Baker	Print	The New York Times	"Obama Seeks Approval by Congress for Strike in Syria"	
2014	Jim Avila	Broadcast	ABC News	Cuba/Alan Gross	
2014	Josh Lederman	Print	Associated Press	Fence Jumper	
2015	Norah O'Donnell	Broadcast	CBS News	"60 Minutes interview with Vice President Joe Biden and his wife, Dr. Jill Biden on his decision not to run for president" in 2016.	
2015	Matt Viser	Print	The Boston Globe	"An Inside Look at How the Iran Talks Unfolded"	
2016	Edward-Isaac Dovere	Print	Politico	"How Obama set a trap for Raul Castro"	
2017	Evan Perez, Jim Sciutto, Jake Tapper and Carl Bernstein	Broadcast	CNN	Intelligence community's briefing of Obama and Trump "that Russia had compromising information about Trump."	
2017	Josh Dawsey	Print	Politico	"Resignation of White House Press Secretary Sean Spicer"	
2018	Ed Henry	Broadcast	Fox News	Interview with Environmental Protection Agency Administrator Scott Pruitt	
2018	Josh Dawsey	Print	Washington Post		
2019	Alan Cullison, Rebecca Ballhaus, and Dustin Volz	Print	The Wall Street Journal	"Trump Repeatedly Pressed Ukraine to Investigate Biden's Son"	
2019		Broadcast	CNN	"FBI. Open the door."	
2020	Michael Balsamo	Print	Associated Press	"Disputing Trump, Barr says no widespread election fraud"	
2020	Jonathan Karl	Broadcast	ABC News	Trump getting COVID and being rushed to the hospital	
2021	Zeke Miller and Mike Balsamo	Print	Associated Press	CDC mask order	
2021	Jonathan Karl	Broadcast	ABC News	January 6 United States Capitol attack coverage	
2022	Jeff Mason	Print	Reuters	"Exclusive: Biden to waive tariffs for 24 months on solar panels hit by probe"	
2022	Phil Mattingly	Broadcast	CNN	Zelenskyy's White House visit	
2023	Peter Baker	Print	The New York Times	Coverage of President Biden's visit to Israel just days after the 2023 Hamas-led attack on Israel	
2023	Tamara Keith	Broadcast	NPR	Audio report of President Biden’s trip to Israel	
2025	Aamer Madhani and Zeke Miller	Print	Associated Press	Madhani and Miller caught the White House press office trying to alter the official account of history — the White House transcript of Biden’s use of the word “garbage” to describe supporters of Donald Trump.	

=== Katharine Graham Award for Courage and Accountability ===
A $10,000 prize to "recognize an individual or newsgathering team for coverage of subjects and events of significant national or regional importance in line with the human and professional qualities exemplified by the late Katharine Graham, the distinguished former publisher of The Washington Post. Debuted in 2020.

Year	Recipient	Employer	Article / Show	Notes / Ref.
2019		ProPublica	"Death in the Pacific"	
2020		The Marshall Project, AL.com, the IndyStar, and Invisible Institute	"Mauled: When Police Dogs are Weapons"	
2021		International Consortium of Investigative Journalists, The Washington Post, "and media partners around the world"	Pandora Papers	
2022	Josh Gerstein and Alex Ward	Politico	Decision "to report, verify and publish the draft Supreme Court opinion reversing abortion rights – and the organization’s follow-up work exploring the consequences of the decision...."	
2023		The Washington Post	"The Washington Post shows courage, sensitivity and originality in breaking with journalism industry norms to inform and show readers how the AR-15 weapon inflicts horrific damage to the human body."	

=== Award for Excellence in Presidential News Coverage by Visual Journalists ===
$1,000 "award recognizes a video or photojournalist for uniquely covering the presidency from a journalistic standpoint, either at the White House or in the field. This could be breaking news, a scheduled event or feature coverage." Debuted in 2020.

Year	Recipient	Employer	Work	Notes / Ref.
2019	Doug Mills	The New York Times	"The Pelosi Clap"	
2020	Win McNamee	Getty Images	Trump and Fauci	
2021	Brendan Smialowski	Agence France-Presse	"US Secretary of State Antony Blinken, President Joe Biden, Russia’s President Vladimir Putin, and Foreign Minister Sergey Lavrov wait for a meeting at Villa La Grange June 16, 2021, in Geneva."	
2022	Doug Mills	The New York Times	"President Joe Biden walks between the Marine Honor Guard as he enters an event to celebrate the passage of H.R. 5376, the Inflation Reduction Act of 2022, on the South Lawn of the White House, Tuesday, Sept. 13, 2022."	
2023	Doug Mills	The New York Times	President Biden boarding Air Force One as he leaves Warsaw, Poland	

=== Discontinued awards ===
==== The Edgar A. Poe Memorial Award ====
Named in honor of the distinguished correspondent Edgar Allen Poe (1906–1998), a former WHCA president unrelated to the American fiction writer of the nearly identical name. Funded by the New Orleans Times-Picayune and Newhouse Newspapers, the award honored excellence in news coverage of subjects and events of significant national or regional importance to the American people. The Edgar A. Poe Memorial Award was presented from 1990 to 2019, when it was replaced by the Katharine Graham Award for Courage and Accountability and the Award for Excellence in Presidential News Coverage by Visual Journalists.

Notable past winners of the award include Rochelle Sharpe, Marjie Lundstrom, Michael Tackett, Russell Carollo, Cheryl Reed, Michael Isikoff, Sam Roe, Sean Naylor, Lance Williams and Mark Fainaru-Wada, Marcus Stern, Megan Twohey, David Fahrenthold, and Norah O'Donnell.

==== Raymond Clapper Memorial Award ====
Named in honor of Raymond Clapper (1892-1944) and given "to a journalist or team for distinguished Washington reporting." The award was presented from 1944 to 2003, usually at the WHCA dinner (although in the period 1951–1965 it was presented at the American Society of News Editors annual dinner).

In 2004, the award passed to the Scripps Howard National Journalism Awards. Under Scripps Howard, the Washington Reporting Raymond Clapper Award was presented until 2011, at which point it was discontinued.

Notable past winners of the Raymond Clapper Award included Ernie Pyle, Nicholas Lemann, Clark R. Mollenhoff, James Reston, Joseph Albright, Morton Mintz, Adam Liptak, Helene Cooper, Jean Heller, Newbold Noyes Jr., Thomas Lunsford Stokes, Tom Squitieri, Marcus Stern, Susan Feeney, Doris Fleeson, James Polk, James V. Risser, and William Neikirk.

== See also ==
- Gridiron Club
- Radio and Television Correspondents' Association
- National Press Club (United States)
- Canadian Parliamentary Press Gallery
