= Ralph Harris (journalist) =

British journalist

- Born: 31 January 1921; Manchester, England
- Died: 24 December 2008 (aged 87); Washington, D.C., U.S.
- Occupation: Journalist
- Years active: 1949–1986
- Spouse: Ena Harris (m. 1944)
- Children: 2

Ralph Harris (31 January 1921 – 24 December 2008) was a British journalist and Reuters presidential correspondent. He was Reuters' official White House correspondent for the presidents from Truman until Reagan.

== Early life ==
Harris was born on 31 January 1921 in Manchester, England. He worked for Birkenhead News, a small news agency centered in Liverpool, until he was drafted to be in the Royal Air Force. After his service, he moved to the United States and joined Reuters, a then-small agency with only five staff members.

== Reuters ==
Ralph Harris covered news conferences throughout the Truman, Eisenhower, Kennedy, Johnson, Nixon, Ford, Carter and Reagan administrations for Reuters. He was Reuters' main reporter during the assassination of John F. Kennedy and the assassination of Lee Harvey Oswald. Harris reported on the hostilities of the South and their support of Jack Ruby, who had killed Oswald. Harris was also Reuters' correspondent on whether Concorde would be allowed to land in the U.S. and for the 1968 Thule Air Base B-52 crash. In 1979, Harris became the first foreign president of the White House Correspondents’ Association. Ralph Harris retired in 1986, after 37 years of working with Reuters. He was commended by Larry Speakes as "a reporter's reporter... [with] accuracy and speed... facts without fluff" and President Ronald Reagan described him as "a veritable institution among the Fourth Estate in Washington". Harris died on 24 December 2008 of respiratory failure.

== Personal life ==
Harris married his wife, Ena, in 1944, and they had two children and four grandchildren. Ralph Harris became a US citizen in 1995, after 36 years of living in the United States. Harris was also a member of the National Press Club.

Media offices
Preceded by Aldo Beckman	President of the White House Correspondents' Association; 1979–1980	Succeeded by Robert C. Pierpoint
