= Mark Smith (journalist) =

American journalist (21st century)

Mark Storey Smith
- Born: New York
- Occupation: Journalist

Mark Storey Smith is an American journalist, serving as White House Correspondent for the Associated Press. He has been covering U.S. presidents since Jimmy Carter and has been present at multiple events throughout history, notably the Falklands War, Prince Charles' and Princess Diana's wedding, the impeachment of President Bill Clinton, and numerous presidential campaigns and inaugurations.

He served as President of the White House Correspondents' Association in 2005–06, and most notably, hired Stephen Colbert as the evening's guest comedian. Colbert's performance was praised by some but attacked by many as having crossed the line. He was mentioned in Colbert's book, I am America (And So Can You!). Also during his presidency, Smith oversaw the renovations of the White House Press Corps facilities, including the White House Press Briefing Office.

In September 2011, he was attacked for his transcription of President Obama's speech at a Congressional Black Caucus awards dinner by some critics who said leaving off the "g" in the words "complaining," "grumbling" and "crying" was racist. Smith said he accurately reflected Obama's choice to speak this way to a black audience.

Smith was born on Long Island in New York. He currently lives in the Washington, D.C. area with his wife.
