= Lars-Erik Nelson =

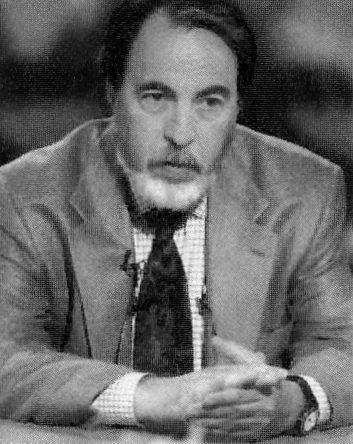
- Syndicated columnist Lars-Erik Nelson.
- Born: October 15, 1941; Brooklyn, New York, US
- Died: November 20, 2000 (aged 59); Bethesda, Maryland
- Education: Columbia University (1963)
- Occupations: Journalist, political columnist, author
- Employer: New York Daily News
- Awards: Merriman Smith Memorial Award, 1980

Lars-Erik Nelson (October 15, 1941 – November 20, 2000) was an American journalist, political columnist and author best known for his syndicated column in the New York Daily News.

== Background ==
Lars-Erik Nelson was born in Brooklyn, New York, the eldest child of immigrants who met while studying art at Cooper Union. He grew up in Riverdale, attended Bronx High School of Science, and was a New York State Regents Scholar. In 1963, Nelson graduated from Columbia University with a degree in Russian. He also was fluent in Czech, French and Swedish.

== Career ==
Nelson subsequently worked at the Digest of Soviet Press, The Bergen County Record, and The New York Herald Tribune. Nelson went to work for the Riverdale Press before joining Reuters in 1967 as a correspondent. He was posted in Moscow, London, and Prague, where in 1968 he covered the Prague Spring. Nelson covered the State Department for Newsweek, from 1977 until 1979, when he left to join The New York Daily News Washington staff. Shortly after beginning his career at the Daily News, Nelson won an Albert Merriman Smith Memorial Award, named after the longtime reporter for United Press International, for writing under deadline pressure. Nelson was bureau chief at The Daily News for about a decade before becoming a columnist for Newsday in 1993. In 1995, he returned to The New York Daily News as a columnist.

Nelson became well known for his syndicated column in the New York Daily News, but his career in the news industry spanned over 40 years and took him all over the world. His work appeared in The New York Review of Books, The Nation magazine, Mother Jones, Foreign Affairs, among others; and his column ran in newspapers across the country.

In December 1983, while speaking to an audience of Congressional Medal of Honor recipients, Ronald Reagan recounted an inspirational act of bravery by a former Medal of Honor recipient:

"A B‑17 coming back across the channel from a raid over Europe, badly shot up by anti‑aircraft ... The young ball‑turret gunner was wounded, and they couldn’t get him out of the turret there while flying. But over the channel, the plane began to lose altitude, and the commander had to order bail out. And as the men started to leave the plane, the last one to leave — the boy, understandably, knowing he was being left behind to go down with the plane, cried out in terror — the last man to leave the plane saw the commander sit down on the floor. He took the boy’s hand and said, ‘Never mind, son, we’ll ride it down together.’ Congressional Medal of Honor posthumously awarded."

Nelson subsequently checked all 434 Medal of Honor awards and could find no citation matching Reagan's story. Days later Nelson wrote, “It’s not true ... It didn’t happen. It’s a Reagan story ... The President of the United States went before an audience of 300 real Congressional Medal of Honor winners and told them about a make‑believe Medal of Honor winner." Disabled veteran Dominic Antonucci, after reading Nelson's column, suggested that the story bore similarities to a scene in the 1944 film Wing and a Prayer. "Adding to the confusion," wrote Nelson, "Dana Andrews at one point reprimands a glory‑seeking young pilot with the words: 'This isn’t Hollywood.' ... You could understand that some in the audience might confuse reality with fiction." Nelson later wrote that Reagan's story was also found to have similarities to a fictional account in the April 1944 issue of Reader's Digest.

While Nelson was questioning Newt Gingrich in November 1995, Gingrich admitted that he had shut down the federal government because President Bill Clinton had made him sit at the back of Air Force One. The infamous Daily News "Cry Baby" cover story ran the following day.

In 1998, during a guest appearance on Meet the Press, Nelson told Tim Russert, "You know Tim, you really ought to call this show 'ME the Press.'".

In November 2000, Nelson broke the story that Katherine Harris, then-State Attorney General in Florida, was not a neutral participant in the Florida ballot controversy, but that she had been significantly involved in George W. Bush’s presidential campaign.

Just a few months before his death, Nelson was a guest on The News Hour with Jim Lehrer and said this about coverage by The New York Times of accused nuclear spy Wen Ho Lee:

Investigative reporting can be agenda-driven. The reporting team gets an idea in its head or they find a source, and they cease being skeptical because they're so delighted to have this insider source. Whitewater was a similar case where the Times believed the version told by Jim McDougal. I think you'll agree he was not a particularly good source. But Jim McDougal's version of Whitewater drove that case. Oddly enough, this is the same reporter in that case who did the Wen Ho Lee series.

Nelson's reporting on the Wen Ho Lee case resulted in an unprecedented full-page retraction on page A2 of The New York Times. When Nelson was accused of having an anti-Times agenda, he responded with this: "I have no anti-Times agenda... I have read it since I was 9 years old. I challenged its coverage of the Wen Ho Lee case precisely because that coverage was such a betrayal of The Times’ own history of accuracy, impartiality, and fair play. Behind the defensiveness of yesterday's correction, I suspect that at least some at The Times agree."

== Death and legacy ==
Nelson died at his home in Bethesda, Maryland, in 2000. Mortimer Zuckerman, publisher of The New York Daily News, subsequently announced that the newspaper had established the Lars-Erik Nelson Prize for excellence in reporting and writing, an annual $5,000 award at Columbia University's Graduate School of Journalism.
