= Robert E. Thompson (journalist) =

Political writer and journalist

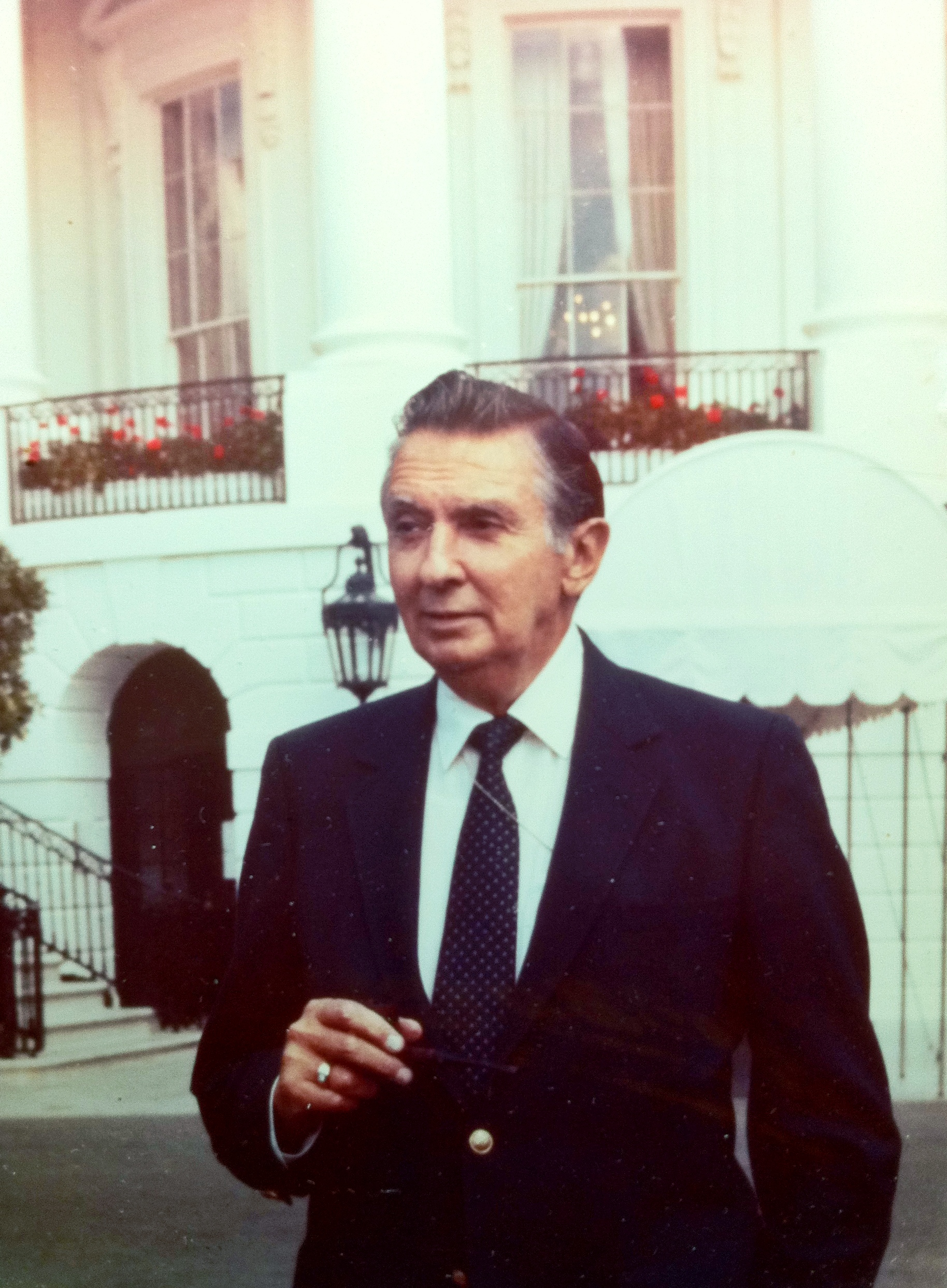
- Born: Robert Elliott Thompson; June 28, 1921; Los Angeles, California, United States
- Died: November 19, 2003 (aged 82); Williamsburg, Virginia, United States
- Education: Indiana University
- Occupation: Journalist
- Known for: Distinguished political writer, newspaperman, editor, publisher, press secretary to John F. Kennedy
- Notable work: Robert F. Kennedy: The Brother Within

Signature
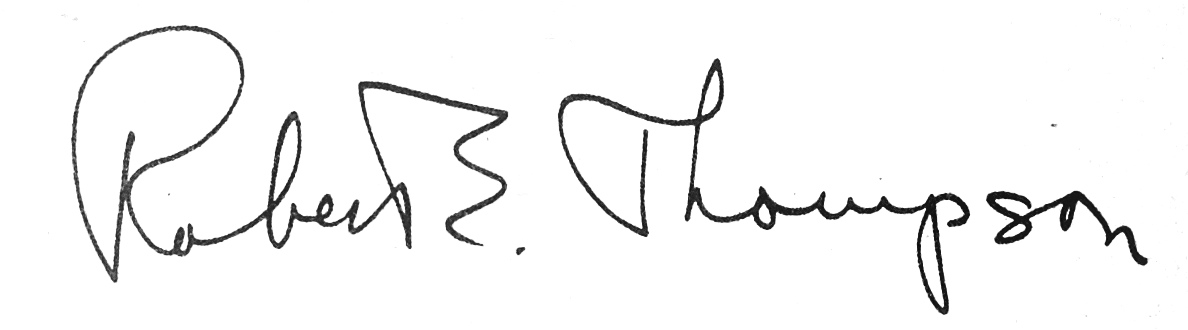

Robert Elliott Thompson (June 28, 1921 – November 19, 2003) was a top political writer and Washington journalist known for his sharp analysis and crisp writing of political affairs, who knew and covered every president from Harry Truman to George W. Bush. Over the course of a long career he rose through the ranks to become, among other things, a White House correspondent, publisher of the Seattle Post-Intelligencer, and national editor and Washington D.C. bureau chief for Hearst Newspapers. He also worked as John F. Kennedy's press secretary in the late 1950s, quitting just prior to the then-Senator's presidential campaign.

== Early life ==
Thompson was born in Los Angeles and lived there until the start of World War II. Fresh out of high school, he joined the Navy after the attack on Pearl Harbor and was stationed in the South Pacific until the end of the war. As a radioman on a PBY Catalina in the famed Black Cats Squadron stationed in the Solomon Islands, he participated in numerous bombing runs on the Japanese Fleet, as well as reconnaissance and search-and-rescue missions.

He was involved in several key battles during the war as the allies pushed northward, including the Battle of Vella Lavella, the Bougainville Campaign and the liberation of the Philippine Islands. He once came under fire when a Japanese Mitsubishi G4M attacked Canton Island where his crew had stopped to refuel on their way to Guadalcanal and watched from a short distance as a direct hit completely destroyed his PBY-5A.

After the war he attended Indiana University where he studied journalism and received the Ernie Pyle award, became the editor of the Daily Student, the school's newspaper, and served on the student governing board. After graduation in 1949 with a B.A. in journalism, Thompson joined the staff of the Journal Gazette in Fort Wayne, Indiana, his first job as a reporter. Many years later he returned to his Alma Mater as the Ernie Pyle lecturer on journalism.

== Journalistic career ==
In 1951, after working as a reporter for only two years, Thompson fulfilled his big ambition of covering Washington politics when he was hired on as a reporter for the International News Service (INS), a wire service owned by Hearst Corporation, to cover the Department of Agriculture. When he arrived one day to interview Secretary Ezra Taft Benson, he met the Secretary's administrative assistant Mary C. Mattern, whom he married in 1954, only three months after they met. Secretary Benson was a guest at their wedding.

In 1956 he covered the first of many presidential campaigns he would attend, beginning with the campaign of Democratic Candidate Adlai Stevenson whom he traversed the country with for several months, followed by the much shorter trip of Vice President Richard Nixon who was campaigning for the incumbent President Dwight Eisenhower.

It was on Stevenson's campaign that Thompson first met Robert F. Kennedy. The two would form a friendship months later during the McClellan Committee hearings into labor racketeering, on which Kennedy served as counsel and which Thompson covered for INS.

=== Kennedy and Johnson administrations ===
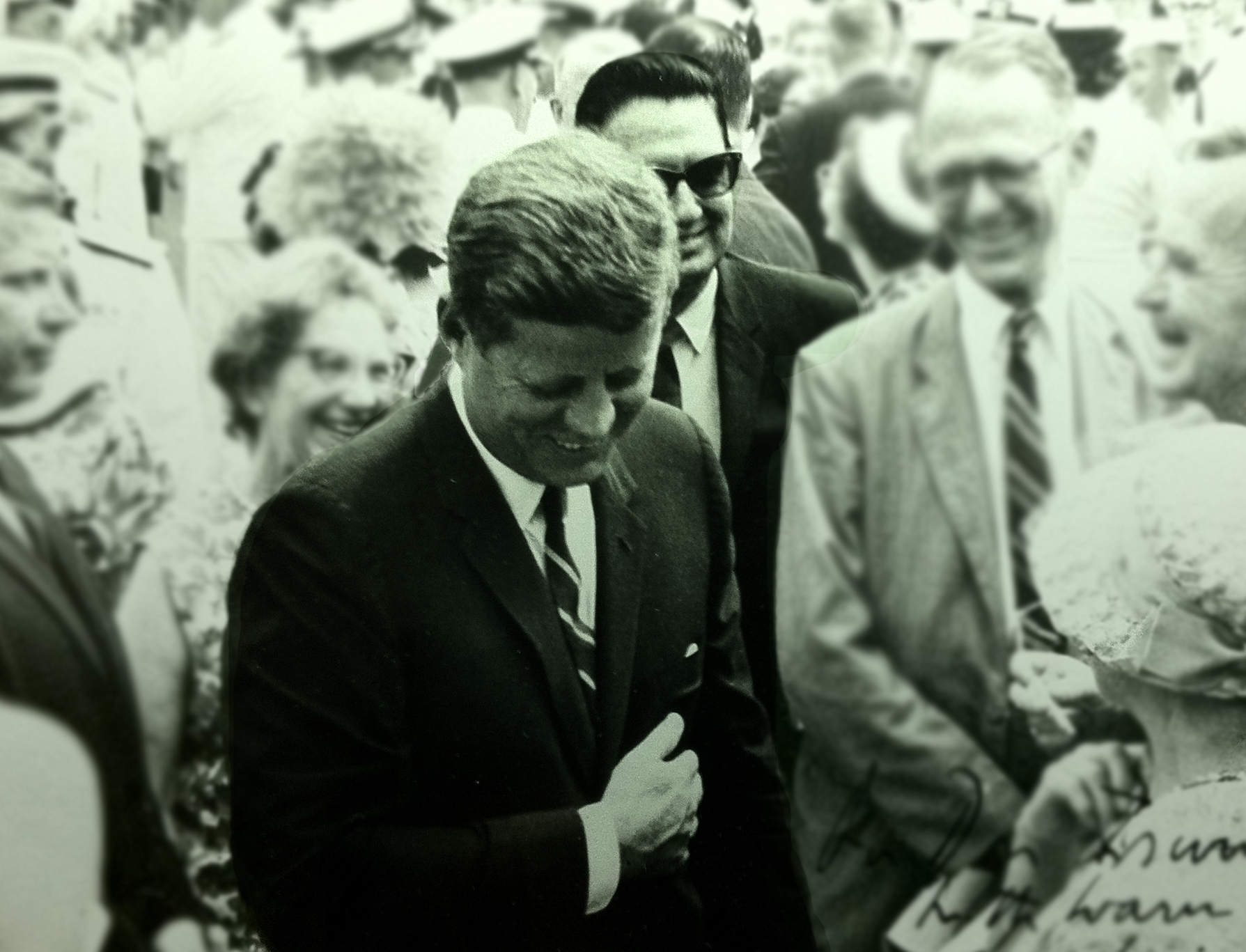
President Kennedy and his former press secretary Bob Thompson (walking just behind Kennedy)

In 1958 INS merged with United Press to become United Press International (UPI). In the transition many people lost their jobs, including Thompson. That same night he attended a party at Robert F. Kennedy's McLean, VA home Hickory Hill and while in conversation with then-Senator John F. Kennedy, the future President offered Bob a position as his press secretary. One of Bob's major contributions to JFK's 1958 senatorial reelection campaign was a movie he put together entitled "The U.S. Senator John F. Kennedy Story" that was broadcast on television in Massachusetts. Kennedy later said "it was the best thing (he) had in the campaign."

Thompson once remarked in an interview that he had been grateful to Kennedy for the job offer "during a very dark night in my life," but he was "always more comfortable as a political observer than a political participant" and in 1959, despite Kennedy's presidential ambitions, Bob quit his staff and joined the Washington Bureau of the New York Daily News where he soon became their White House correspondent and was assigned to cover the new President, his former boss, John F. Kennedy. In 1962 he joined the Los Angeles Times and that same year, only days before the height of the Cuban Missile Crisis, he published the first biography ever written about the President's brother, the budding United States Attorney General Robert F. Kennedy, entitled Robert F. Kennedy: The Brother Within.

Thompson did not to travel to Dallas with President Kennedy and the White House press corps in late November 1963, but when news of the assassination of John F. Kennedy broke, he left Washington almost immediately on a special plane chartered specifically for members of the press, where he met up with Miami Herald reporter and fellow Indiana University alumnus Gene Miller. Miller and Thompson had attended IU together and were fast friends. Bob Thompson spent the next two days mostly inside Dallas Police Headquarters gathering information and interviewing people such as the Dallas Chief of Police Jesse Curry, the President's suspected assassin Lee Harvey Oswald and even Oswald's mother and wife. On the final day when Oswald was to be transferred from the police headquarters to the courthouse, Miller, a two-time Pulitzer Prize winner, felt that if anything were to happen to Oswald it would happen outside the station, where Miller decided to wait. Bob Thompson decided to wait in the basement where the prisoner would be brought through. As Miller had predicted, though wrongly about where, Jack Ruby stepped out in front of the reporters gathered around Oswald and fatally shot him. Thompson was witness to the whole thing standing only several feet away while Miller was still waiting outside. Years later Miller remarked about the incident, "So much for Pulitzer intuitions."

In 1966 Thompson was promoted to Washington bureau chief for Hearst newspapers. His first meeting with the chain's editor-in-chief, William Randolph Hearst Jr., was rather comedic. At a luncheon set up to introduce him to his new boss, Thompson openly disagreed with an editorial position Hearst had taken. A colleague of his began kicking him under the table signaling him to be quiet. Undeterred, Thompson lifted the tablecloth, looked under the table and asked the man why he was being kicked. Far from annoyed, Hearst seemed to be won over by Thompson's honesty. That same year he also had the honor of being appointed as president of the White House Correspondents Association. He served as bureau chief through the end of the Johnson administration, during the height of the Vietnam War as the Capital convulsed in turmoil from protests and anger. In fact Thompson, who had logged hundreds of hours flying aboard Air Force One with both Kennedy and Lyndon Johnson, accompanied LBJ on an unannounced visit to see the troops in Vietnam in 1966.

=== Publisher, Seattle Post-Intelligencer ===
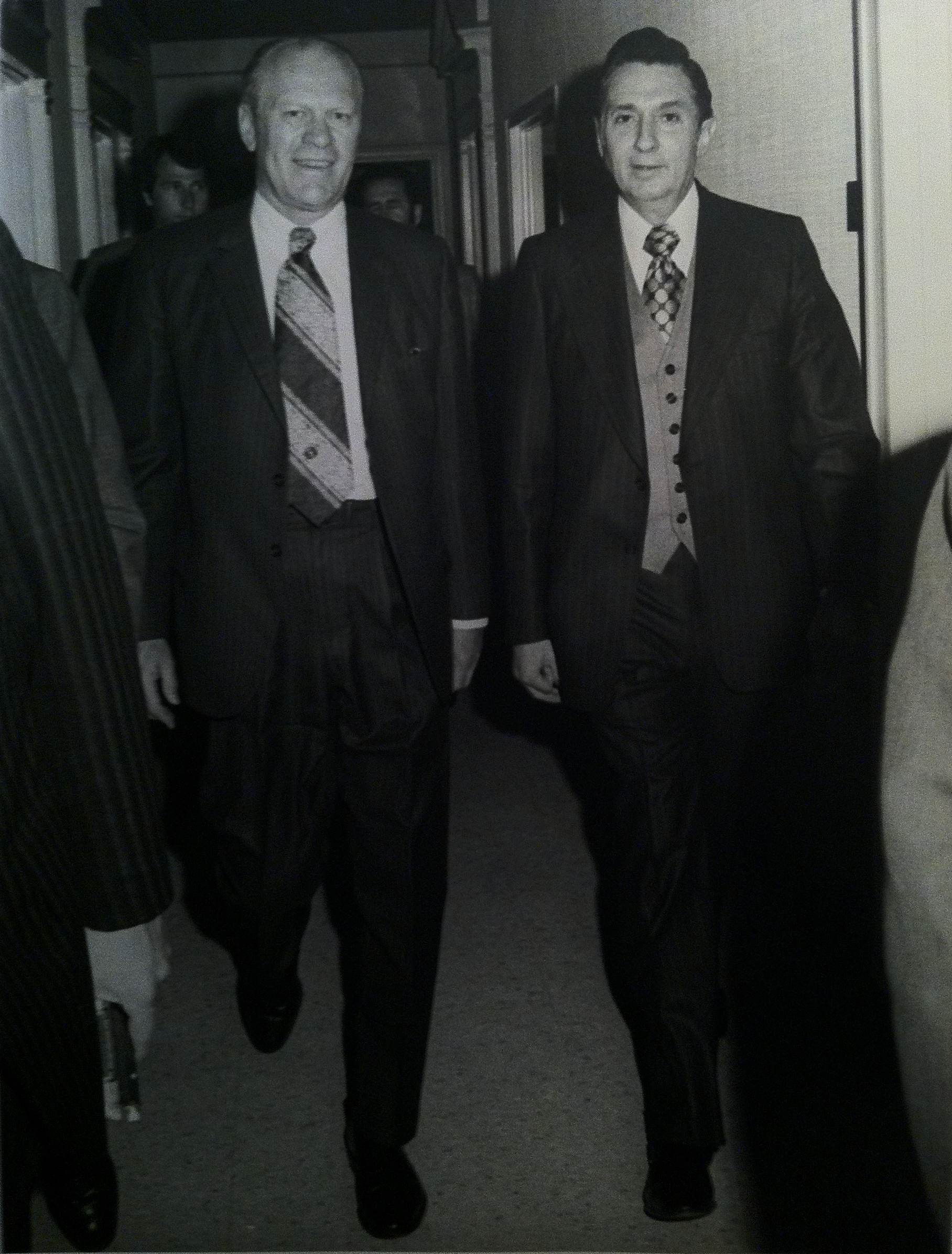
President Gerald Ford and Bob Thompson

Following his term as bureau chief, Thompson moved his family to Seattle and took up the post as publisher of the (now defunct) Seattle Post-Intelligencer from 1974 to 1978. He also served as a juror for the Pulitzer Prize from 1975 to 1976. While he enjoyed running his own paper, after only four years in Seattle he missed being in the heart of the political landscape and writing about Washington politics. In 1978 he moved the family back to Washington, D.C. and reclaimed his former position as bureau chief for Hearst, which he held until 1989. During this period he would fly to China once with President Ronald Reagan and once with President George H. W. Bush. One day following a seating chart, President Ronald Reagan called upon Thompson at a White House press conference. Unbeknownst to him, Thompson was sitting with his wife at home in his robe and slippers, a glass of wine in his hand watching the televised conference from the comfort of his favorite chair. Without missing a beat when he heard his name, Thompson dutifully stood and raised his glass toward Reagan's TV image in salute.

== Syndicated column, impact, and legacy ==
When he retired, he continued to write a weekly column for Hearst. Using his vast experience to write crisp, clean articles that dissected politics with a sweeping historical narrative Thompson subtly reflected on his long career while simultaneously analyzing current political events, sometimes in the same sentence. With a keen eye for history he endeavored to prove to his readers that the past is in fact prologue. He continued his column until a month before his death in 2003. "Throughout his long career, Thompson worried about the balance between tough "gotcha" reporting on the candidates' character and records, and a broader portrait of a candidate that would look at their performance with a less adversarial tone.". Reflecting on his chosen profession and career, Thompson wrote in 1980,

We have a professional duty to report aggressively, write vividly, analyze wisely, but we should never lose sight of the fact that a free press should be a responsible press.

Bob Thompson's columns were noted for their ability to call up the past. In many instances he would find similarities between current issues and past events, and explore the cause and effect relationship between them. The political commentator Chris Matthews, who worked with Thompson when he (Matthews) was the bureau chief for the San Francisco Examiner, used Thompson's recollections in his book about Kennedy and Nixon. In an interview with C-SPAN founder and host Brian Lamb, Matthews spoke of Thompson's experience as Kennedy's press secretary,

But Bob Thompson, who was a Hearst reporter who had spent a year working for Jack Kennedy's staff in--in 1959, told me how it was odd. Nixon would -- he used to see this happen like a ritual. Nixon would come out of his office, the vice president's office, and almost like God had said, 'Let's see them come out of the offices together', Kennedy would come out of his, and Nixon would be kind of deflated, because here's this gleaming, you know, Adonis that Kennedy had become in the late '50s. He'd gotten to be -- his back problem had been solved; his cortisone shots had filled out his face. He looked great. He never looked better, in fact, than he looked in 1960. And there's Nixon, you know, `What's this? Do I have to confront this every time I come out of my office?' And I think it was an amazing physical intimidation that went on.

Thompson himself was interviewed a number of times on C-SPAN in the 1980s, usually by the network's founder, Brian Lamb. In addition to the White House Correspondents Association, Thompson was also a member of the Gridiron Club, Washington's oldest journalistic organization known mostly for its annual dinner, the Cosmos Club, a Washington social club where National Geographic was founded, and the National Press Club.

=== Military awards ===

Combat Aircrew Badge
World War II Victory Medal	Air Medal	Asiatic-Pacific Campaign Medal	Philippine Liberation Medal
