= Caren Bohan =

American journalist

Caren Bohan is an American journalist currently servicing as the Editor-in-Chief of USA Today with broad experience covering Wall Street and Washington.

Bohan formerly served as the White House Correspondents' Association from 2011 to 2012 and current member of the Gridiron Club. She covered the White House from 2003 to 2012 and was a lead correspondent for Barack Obama's 2008 presidential campaign.

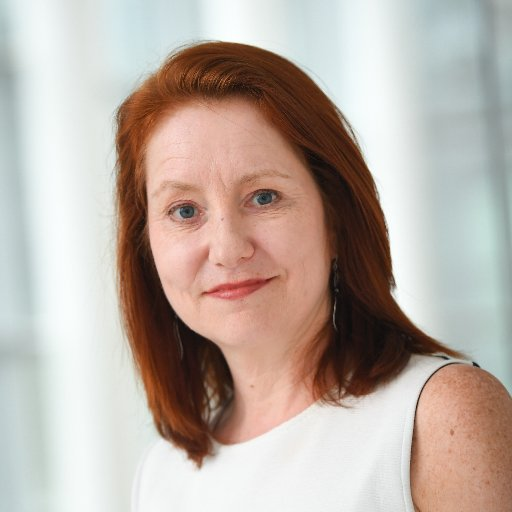
Caren Bohan

== Personal ==
Bohan was born in Boston, Massachusetts. She is married and has two children.

== Education ==
She graduated from Dover-Sherborn high school, obtained her B.A. in English Literature from McGill University in Montreal and later her master's degree in journalism from the University of California, Berkeley.

== Career ==
Bohan began her career in journalism at Tab Communications in metropolitan Boston, covering government, taxes, crime and other local matters. During graduate school, she interned with Reuters in Washington, and after graduating, she was hired by Reuters in New York to write about corporate news. Later she covered bonds, gold and financial markets on Wall Street, serving a stint as assistant desk editor.

Following several promotions, Bohan moved to Washington to cover U.S. economic data, the Federal Reserve and economic policy. She was promoted to the White House beat in 2003 and covered the presidencies of George W. Bush and Barack Obama, scoring interviews with both men. She was also one of the first journalists to report that Ben Bernanke would become chairman of the Federal Reserve.

As White House correspondent Bohan traveled to dozens of countries, including Afghanistan, and interviewed scores of world leaders. In 2011–2012, she was voted by her peers to be president of the White House Correspondents Association. She hosted the annual dinner with President Obama and chose late-night TV host Jimmy Kimmel as the event's comedian.

After working at Reuters for more than two decades, Bohan accepted an offer to become a senior editor at Atlantic Media's National Journal. She led the digital team's Washington coverage and later was elevated to Managing Editor for Policy.

Following her stint at National Journal, Bohan returned to Reuters as senior domestic policy correspondent to cover Congress and work on special enterprise assignments. She was promoted to senior editor in charge of domestic policy, Congress and the White House ahead of the 2016 U.S. elections, managing a large team of reporters.

In 2018, Bohan was hired by Gannett's USA Today as Washington editor.

== Membership ==
Bohan is a member of the Gridiron Club.
