= Walter Trohan =

American journalist of the 20th century

- Born: Walter J. Trohan; July 4, 1903; Mt. Carmel, Pennsylvania
- Died: October 28, 2003 (aged 100); Bethesda, Maryland
- Occupation: Journalist (newspaperman)
- Years active: 1927–1978
- Known for: Washington bureau chief (1947–1968) for Chicago Tribune newspaper

Walter Trohan (July 4, 1903 – October 30, 2003) was a 20th-century American journalist, known as a long-time Chicago Tribune reporter (1929–1971) and its bureau chief in Washington, D.C. (1949–1968).

== Background ==
Trohan was born on July 4, 1903, in Mount Carmel, Pennsylvania. In 1920, he family moved to the South Side of Chicago, where his father was a wholesale grocer. He attended Bowen High School, reported for a bit at the Daily Calumet, and in 1926 graduated from the University of Notre Dame.

== Career ==
After college, Trohan went to New York City to work but "didn't like it" and returned to Chicago. In 1927, Trohan went to work at the City News Bureau of Chicago (1927–1929).

On February 29, 1929, he received an offer to join the Chicago Tribune newspaper. As a young reporter, he was first on the scene of the infamous St. Valentine's Day Massacre, when Al Capone's gang gunned down several members of the rival Bugs Moran gang.

In 1934, the Tribinue transferred Trohan as assistant correspondent to Washington, DC, when Franklin Roosevelt was president. In spite of the Tribune's hostility to Roosevelt's policies, Trohan and the president "maintained cordial relations." (Later, Trohan said that Roosevelt had "charisma in spades" but was "the worst snob I ever ran across.") In 1936, Trohan called FBI Director J. Edgar Hoover a "Keystone cop," but eventually, they became friends.

=== Harry Truman ===
Trohan recalled that he did not know Harry Truman well initially because he did not cover Capitol Hill much. However, he met him and noted that US Senator Burton K. Wheeler had gotten Truman a seat on the Senate's Interstate Commerce Committee. He said that he received a lot of advice from Wheeler and Lewis B. Schwellenbach. On the committee, Truman proved himself "quite an expert investigator." That said, he did not think Truman had enough experience to run for vice president and believed that Roosevelt chose Truman simply to avoid running again with Henry A. Wallace.

=== Anticommunist and Alger Hiss ===
On December 26, 1946, the Tribune had a front-page story by Trohan, "New Congress' Pink 'Advisors' Face G.O.P. Ax."

In 1947, Trohan became "executive director" of the Tribune's Washington bureau through 1949.

On September 26, 1948, he reported that Alger Hiss was about to flee the country, rather than file a libel suit against Whittaker Chambers. Hiss filed the suit the very next day. Overall, Trohan was critical of Truman's handling of the Hiss Case: "Like the time he fronted for Alger Hiss. He wasn't fronting for Alger Hiss, per se, he thought they were attacking him through Hiss. Roosevelt would have sacrificed Hiss at the snap of the finger. He would have sacrificed anybody, but Mr. Truman figured that that was a fight on him, so he supported Hiss whom he didn't really like; thought he was a terrible fellow."

=== Douglas MacArthur ===
In 1949, Trohan became Washington bureau chief (or "director") until 1969. In 1951, Trohan was known for ferreting out the fact that Truman planned to fire General Douglas MacArthur, the commander of UN forces in Korea. When Truman found out that Trohan knew about his plan, he publicly announced his decision via General Omar Bradley and robbed Trohan of the scoop. He experienced censorship during World War II as well.

=== "Washington Report" ===
From 1951 to 1968, Trohan also filed a radio broadcast, "Washington Report." In 1959, he accompanied US President Dwight Eisenhower on a three-continent tour.

In 1969, he retired from his position as Washington bureau chief and, on December 31, 1971, from his radio and column.

=== Richard Nixon ===
Trohan was a long-time "intimate journalist friend" of Richard Nixon. In 1953, he wrote Nixon (then the vice president) a letter that warned him against U.S. Senator Joseph McCarthy.

== Personal life ==
Around 1929, Trohan married Carol Rowland. They had two daughters and a son.

Trohan was president of the White House Correspondents' Association in 1937-1938 and the Gridiron Club in 1967.

Trohan was anti-Semitic. For instance, in 1950, he wrote an article that accused US Senator Herbert H. Lehman, Supreme Court Justice Felix Frankfurter, and US Treasury Secretary Henry Morgenthau Jr. were part of an alleged "secret super-Government of Jews in Washington."

Trohan and his wife lived in County Clare, Ireland, from 1971 to 1978 and then returned to live in Columbia, Maryland.

== Death ==
Trohan died at 100 on October 28, 2003, in a hospital in Bethesda, Maryland.

== Legacy ==
Trohan is the source for much unique information about Franklin Roosevelt's health that turned up in various publications and FBI documents. He was the source for much of a controversial article published by Dr. Karl C. Wold in Look Magazine in 1947. He also collaborated with James A. Farley in ghost writing his memoirs. Trohan's papers are housed at the Herbert Hoover Library, near Cedar Rapids, Iowa.

== Work ==
In 1975 Trohan wrote his memoirs and titled the book Political Animals. In the book, he recalled how when he arrived in Washington in 1934 as an assistant correspondent in the Tribune's Washington Bureau. He could remember freely wandering Roosevelt's White House and interviewing cabinet members and other staff. Due to tightened security measures, this freedom no longer exists.

- Political Animals: Memoirs of a Sentimental Cynic (New York: Doubleday, 1975)

== See also ==
- Harry S. Truman
- Alger Hiss
- Douglas MacArthur

== External sources ==
- CIA: Letter November 20, 1947, thanking Walter Trohan for candidate
