= Olivier Knox =

French American journalist

- Education: Columbia University (BA); Johns Hopkins University (MA); Middlebury College Language Schools
- Occupation: journalist
- Known for: chief Washington D.C. correspondent for SiriusXM former chair of the White House Correspondents' Association

Olivier Knox is a French American journalist who is the chief Washington correspondent for SiriusXM. In addition to his career at Agence France-Presse and Yahoo News, he is most known for chairing the White House Correspondents' Association and for his reboot of the White House Correspondents Dinner into its original format, which saw the elimination of the tradition of having a comedian as the featured speaker and an absence of A-list celebrities at the event.

== Education ==
He graduated from Columbia College in 1992 and obtained his graduate degree from Johns Hopkins School of Advanced International Studies. At Columbia, he studied with political scientist Charles V. Hamilton and Shakespeare scholar James S. Shapiro. He also studied at the Middlebury College Language Schools, where he took a course in Italian, and graduated in 1994.

== Career ==
He began his career as an Agence France-Presse desk editor and worked as a Congressional and White House correspondent for 15 years, during which he covered the impeachment of Bill Clinton, Al Gore's presidential campaign, as well as the George W. Bush and Barack Obama administrations. He covered the White House for AFP from 2000 to 2009, right until Barack Obama's inauguration.

In 2012, he was hired by Yahoo news as its first White House correspondent and later became its chief Washington correspondent. He also hosted a weekly political round-table show on P.O.T.U.S. for three years on behalf of Yahoo News. In 2018, he was named the new chief Washington correspondent for SiriusXM. He returned to the P.O.T.U.S. channel and is now hosting a radio talk show called "The Big Picture".

He was elected president of the White House Correspondents' Association from 2018 to 2019, beating Major Garrett of CBS News, 121 to 90 votes. During the White House Correspondents Dinner of 2019, he announced an annual prize of $25,000 for the best piece of investigative political journalism focused on accountability in state government.

In preparation of the dinner that year, Knox broke with tradition by making a departure from the lighthearted and star-studded atmosphere of previous years' dinners and giving it a more serious tone with the invitation of historian and biographer Ron Chernow, instead of a professional comedian, as the featured speaker. The dinner also saw reduced attendance of Hollywood celebrities from previous years. Knox welcomed those changes, saying that he wanted to return the event to its original roots and do away with the "celebrification" of the dinner.

== Personal life ==
Knox lives in Bethesda, Maryland with his wife, Jennifer Lewis, and their son. He is the son of Middlebury College professors Edward C. Knox and the late Huguette-Laure Knox, both of whom taught in the French Department. His father is American and his mother is French. He was born in Vermont, but grew up in both France and the United States.

== See also ==
- White House press corps
