= Carl M. Cannon =

American journalist

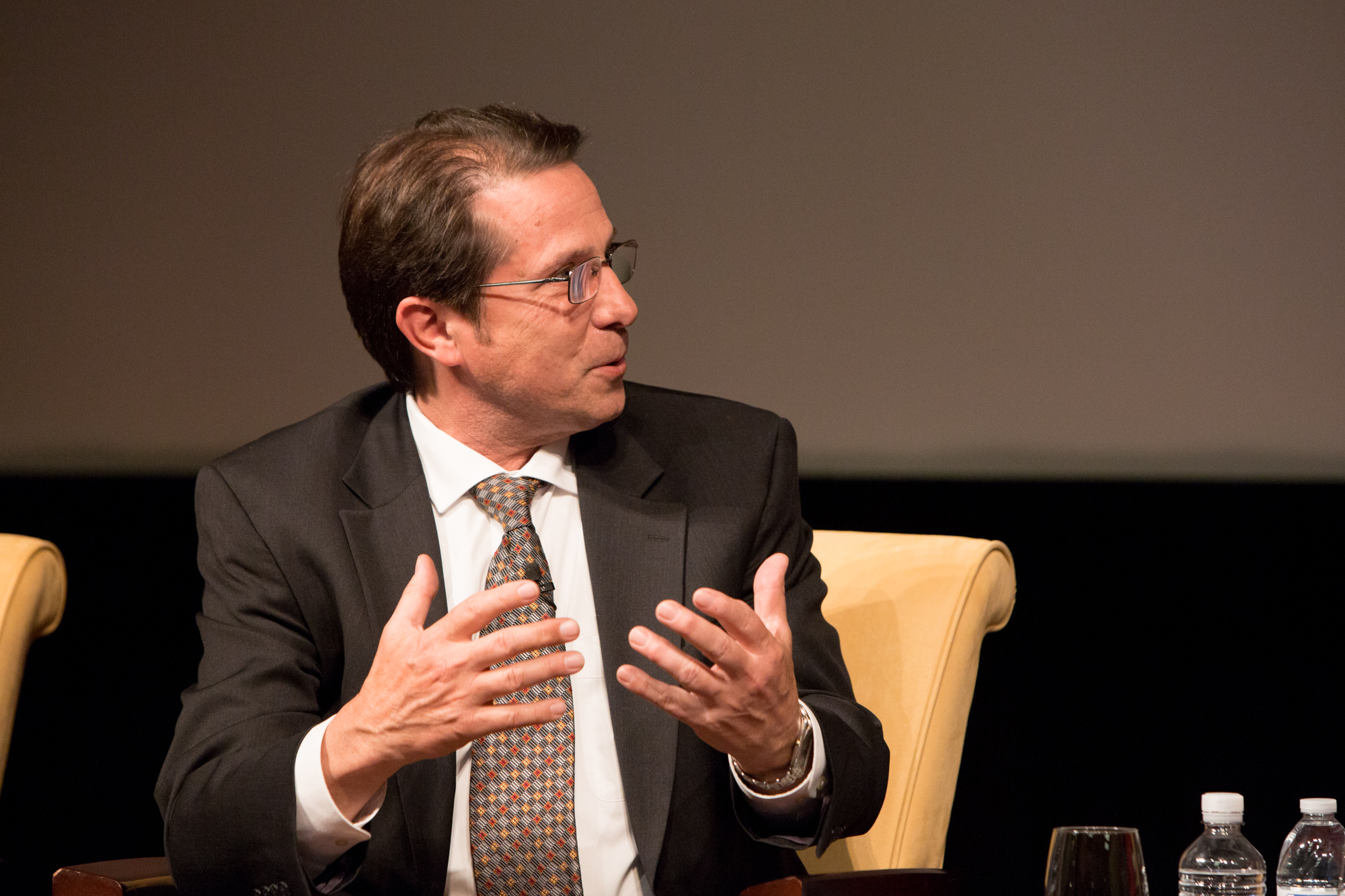
- Born: 1953 (age 72–73)
- Education: University of Colorado
- Occupation: Journalist
- Relatives: Lou Cannon (father)

Carl M. Cannon (born 1953) is an American journalist who is the executive editor and Washington, D.C., bureau chief of RealClearPolitics. He describes himself as "a lifelong political independent and nonpartisan journalist."

Cannon, son of Lou Cannon, was born in California and graduated from the University of Colorado. He worked as a reporter in Petersburg, Virginia, Columbus, Georgia, and at The San Diego Tribune, and later the San Jose Mercury News, the Baltimore Sun, and the National Journal before being hired by RealClearPolitics in 2011. At the Mercury News, he was part of the reporting team that was awarded the 1990 Pulitzer Prize in the category of general news reporting for coverage of the Loma Prieta earthquake. In 2003, he was elected president of the White House Correspondents Association. He has also served as a Fellow-in-Residence at the Harvard University Institute of Politics. Cannon is a recipient of the Aldo Beckman Award for Journalistic Excellence.

== Bibliography ==
Title	Year	ISBN	Publisher	Subject matter	Interviews, presentations, and reviews	Comments
The Pursuit of Happiness in Times of War	2003	ISBN 9780742525917	Rowman & Littlefield		Booknotes interview with Cannon on The Pursuit of Happiness in Times of War, December 28, 2003, C-SPAN	
Boy Genius: Karl Rove, the Architect of George W. Bush's Remarkable Political Triumphs	2005	ISBN 9781586483364	PublicAffairs	Karl Rove		Written with Lou Dubose and Jan Reid.
Reagan's Disciple: George W. Bush's Troubled Quest for a Presidential Legacy	2008	ISBN 9781586484484	PublicAffairs	George W. Bush	After Words interview with Cannon on Reagan's Disciple, March 23, 2008, C-SPAN	Written with Lou Cannon.
Circle of Greed: The Spectacular Rise and Fall of the Lawyer Who Brought Corporate America to its Knees	2010	ISBN 9780767929943	Broadway Books	William Lerach	After Words interview with Cannon on Circle of Greed, July 31, 2010, C-SPAN	Written with Patrick Dillon.
On This Date: From the Pilgrims to Today, Discovering America One Day at a Time	2017	ISBN 9781455542307	Twelve		Book party hosted by the Hoover Institution for On This Date, July 19, 2017, C-SPAN; Q&A interview with Cannon on On This Date, August 20, 2017, C-SPAN	
