= White House press corps =

Group of journalists covering the US president

The White House press corps is the group of journalists, correspondents, and members of the media usually assigned to the White House in Washington, D.C., to cover the government administration of the president of the United States, White House events, and news briefings. Its offices are located in the West Wing.

== Overview ==
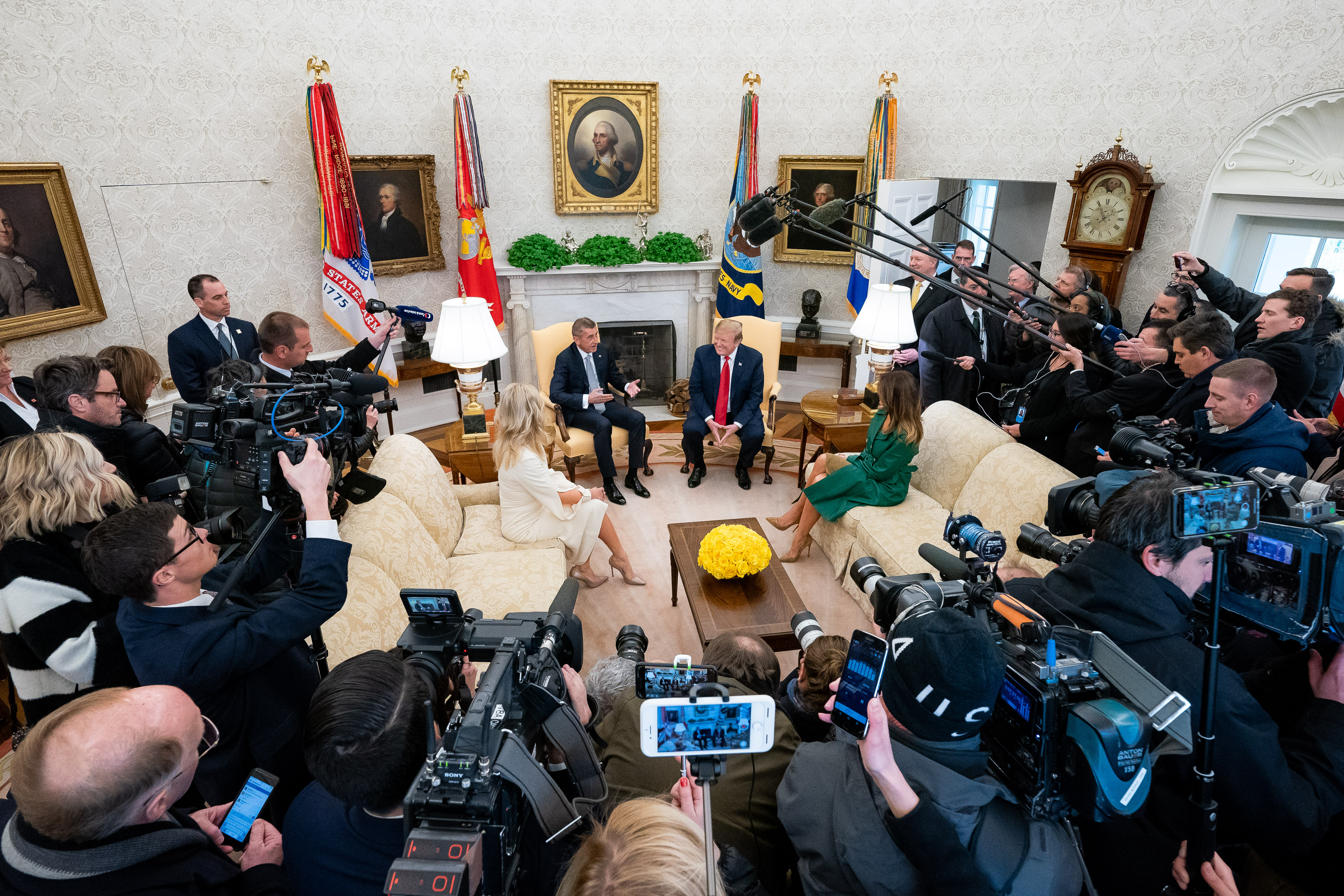
Photographers and videographers in the Oval Office in 2019

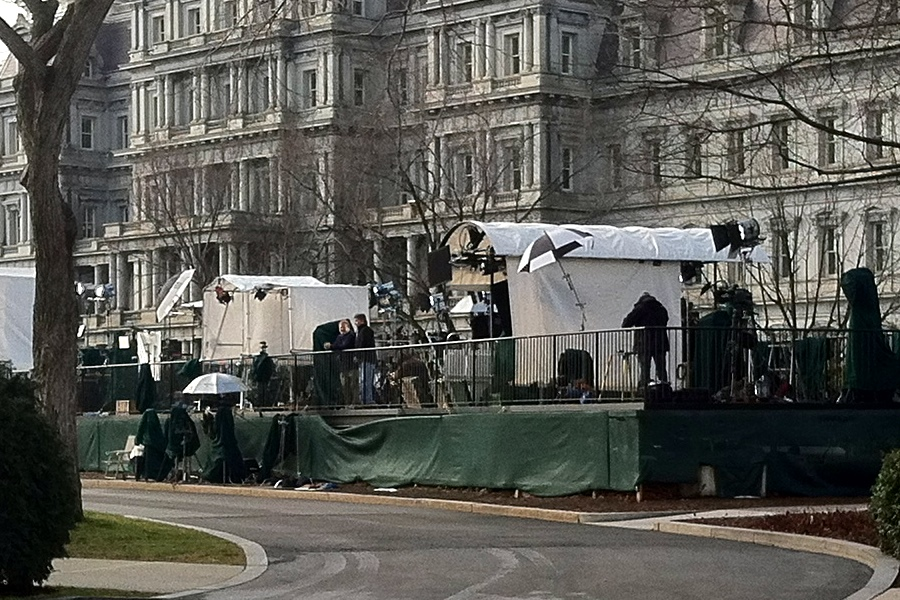
Semi-permanent setup of press corps on the west end of the north White House lawn, from where live media broadcasts with the White House are typically delivered

The White House press secretary, or a deputy, generally holds a weekday news briefing in the James S. Brady Press Briefing Room, which currently seats 49 reporters. Each seat is assigned to a news gathering organization, with the most prominent organizations occupying the first two rows. Reporters who do not have an assigned seat may stand. Often a smaller group of reporters known as the "press pool" is assembled to report back to their colleagues on events where the venue would make open coverage logistically difficult. There can be different pools assembled on any given day to include a pool covering the president, vice president, first lady, and other prominent members of the staff.

When a new U.S. president is elected, some news organizations change their correspondents, most often to the reporter who had been assigned to cover the new president during the preceding campaign. For example, after the 2020 United States presidential election, Peter Doocy, Fox News' lead campaign reporter during the two years that Joe Biden campaigned for president, moved on to be the chief White House correspondent for the cable news channel, replacing John Roberts, who had been chief correspondent during the first presidency of Donald Trump.

== History ==
The White House press corps had their first duties in the White House in the early 1900s. An urban legend exists of President Theodore Roosevelt noticing a group of correspondents in the rain looking for sources for their stories and inviting them into the White House. Subsequent historical research outlines how reporters were able to start with small stories in the White House and then grew their presence and influence over a span of many years.

In 1977, a court ruled in Sherrill v. Knight that the White House had a limited right to deny a press pass.

=== Obama Presidency ===
In 2009, the Obama administration attempted to bar Fox News from a scheduled interview with Treasury Department official Kenneth Feinberg. White House communications officials had also advised Treasury Department spokesperson Jenni LeCompte to skip over questions from Fox News. The administration later decided not to exclude Fox News from any upcoming interviews. In 2010, the administration claimed Fox News correspondent James Rosen was a possible co-conspirator in a criminal leak case and secretly monitored his confidential communications.

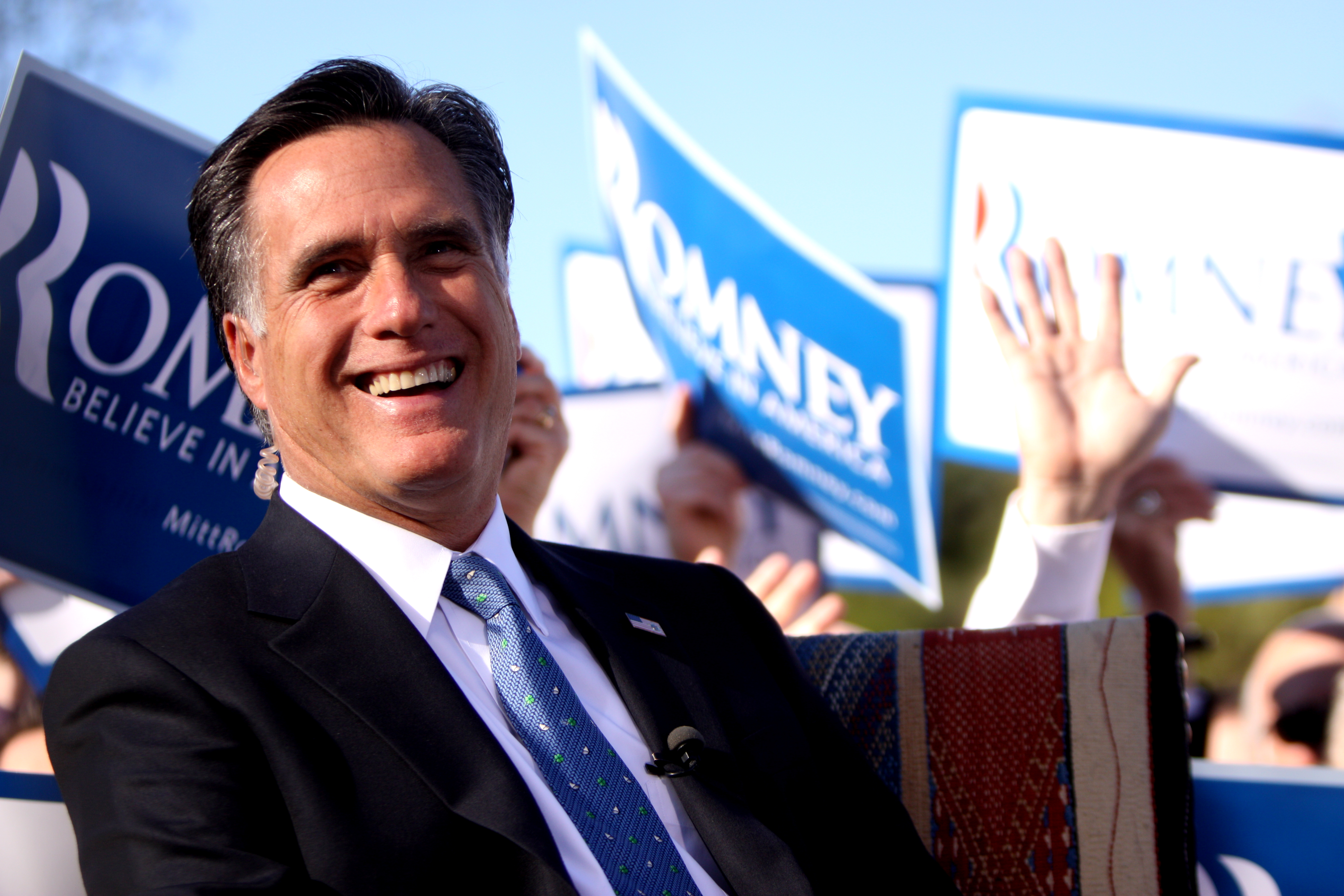
Presidential candidate Mitt Romney at a rally in Arizona

In May 2011, the White House Press Office had restricted the Boston Herald from the press pool after the newspaper had run a front page op-ed on then potential presidential candidate Mitt Romney. White House spokesperson Matt Lehrich stated that by running the op-ed as a full front page piece, the White House believed the paper had "excluded any coverage coverage of the visit of a sitting US President to Boston."

=== First Trump Presidency ===
In 2018, during the first presidency of Donald Trump, the White House withdrew the pass of Jim Acosta of CNN. CNN sued, and a federal judge temporarily ordered the pass to be restored, on grounds of due process. In May 2019, under a new standard, the White House revoked dozens of press passes.

=== Biden Presidency ===
In April 2021, a fake journalist going by the name Kacey Montagu infiltrated the White House Press Corps under the fake outlet White House News. Montagu reportedly participated in COVID-19 pandemic response briefings. Montagu's absence from the physical press pool was covered by pandemic regulations. The person behind Kacey Montagu was never formally unmasked, but was revealed to be an 18-year-old Roblox player from the United Kingdom. Politico later exposed Montagu as an impersonator in an article published in April. This later led to the suspension of Montagu's Twitter accounts.

In 2023, the Biden administration revised the official policy for obtaining long-term press passes. Hard pass applicants would be required to meet new criteria. This included: being a full-time employee of a news organization, having a physical address in Washington, D.C., and having an assignment to cover the White House. In August, Politico reported that the number of hard pass holders had dropped from 1,417 to 975. A spokesperson for the White House claimed that only one applicant under the new criteria had been denied, though the applicant's identity was not revealed.

=== Second Trump Presidency ===
In February 2025, during the second presidency of Donald Trump, the White House announced that it would determine which outlets are allowed access to the president, instead of the White House Correspondents' Association.

On September 18, 2026, Trump announced that he was banning CNN, MS NOW, and Politico from the White House, effective immediately. The following Monday, the three news outlets filed a lawsuit in the D.C. district court, seeking a temporary restraining order to lift the ban. The same day, the five members of the primary White House television pool - Fox, ABC, CBS, NBC, and CNN - issued a statement announcing that they were suspending coverage of the president. In solidarity, several major papers—including The New York Times and The Washington Post—agreed to hold off publishing or distributing still photos taken as part of the White House pool coverage on Monday, delaying release until midnight. Several other outlets with photographers in the White House pool—among them The Associated Press, Reuters, Getty Images, and Agence France-Presse—likewise agreed to withhold images from Trump's events until midnight.

The official wordmark for TRUMP TV

On September 21, the official White House YouTube channel debuted TRUMP TV: The Essentials Channel which later aired on the official White House website. The station is a 24/7 livestream showing past Trump rallies and current Trump events. The station received criticism for airing after CNN, MS NOW, and Politico were banned from the White House. The station also received criticism for being "state-run TV."

On September 22, the Department of Justice defended the administration's action in a court filing, citing national security concerns and alleged violations of standards of professionalism and decorum.

== Notable correspondents ==
The White House Correspondents' Association organizes the James S. Brady Press Briefing Room seating chart. Several outlets have had reporters covering the White House full-time and a permanent assigned seat in the James S. Brady Press Briefing Room.

- Jim Acosta
- Yamiche Alcindor
- Peter Alexander
- Peter Baker
- Rebecca Ballhaus
- Jennifer Bendery
- Carl Bernstein
- Margaret Brennan
- David Brody
- Kaitlan Collins
- Philip Crowther
- Jeremy Diamond
- Sam Donaldson, ABC News
- Peter Doocy
- Devin Dwyer
- Andrew Feinberg
- Kristin Fisher
- Major Garrett
- Maggie Haberman
- Jacqui Heinrich
- Astead Herndon
- Hallie Jackson
- Weijia Jiang
- Jonathan Karl
- Annie Karni
- Tamara Keith
- Seung Min Kim
- Mark Knoller
- Olivier Knox
- Michelle Kosinski
- Mara Liasson
- Zeke Miller
- David Nakamura
- Ashley Parker
- Ayesha Rascoe
- Dan Rather, CBS News
- Paula Reid
- Chanel Rion
- John Roberts
- Michael D. Shear
- Jake Tapper
- Kayla Tausche
- Helen Thomas
- Ben Tracy
- Jake Turx
- Cecilia Vega
- Kristen Welker
- Bob Woodward

== See also ==
- Press gallery
- Canberra Press Gallery
- Kremlin pool
- Press secretary
