= Carrie Budoff Brown =

American journalist and news editor

- Born: Carrie Budoff
- Education: Rutgers University, New Brunswick (BA)
- Occupation: Journalist

Carrie Budoff Brown is an American journalist and news editor. She is currently the Senior Vice President of Meet the Press on NBC News.

She is the former editor of Politico. Previously, she served as the managing editor of Politico Europe and as a White House correspondent at Politico. Before joining Politico, she worked as a reporter at The Philadelphia Inquirer and The Hartford Courant.

== Biography ==
Brown grew up in York, Pennsylvania. While attending Central York High School, she interned at the York Daily Record. Brown later attended Rutgers University and graduated in 1998. She interned at The New York Times for one and a half years. She received the 2012 Merriman Smith Memorial Award for Excellence in Presidential Coverage under pressure.

In November 2016, she was named editor of Politico after several co-founders left to start a rival, Axios. In her new role, Budoff Brown oversaw investigations and stories that helped the publication "get its groove back" in 2017, according to Washingtonian.

In 2021, Budoff Brown moved to NBC News, where her "new role is often akin to an unofficial managing editor of NBC News Digital," and she recruited former colleagues from Politico, sparking a legal threat, according to The Daily Beast.

In November 2023, Budoff Brown was named as the Chair of the Board of Directors for the International Center for Journalists, a non-profit dedicated to promoting journalistic integrity.

In March 2024, Budoff Brown announced in a memo to staff the hiring of Ronna McDaniel as an on-air commentator, stating, "It couldn’t be a more important moment to have a voice like Ronna’s on the team.” NBC's decision drew public criticism because McDaniel, the former Republican National Committee chair, refused to acknowledge that Joe Biden was fairly elected as president in 2020.
