= Weijia Jiang =

American television journalist

- 江惟嘉
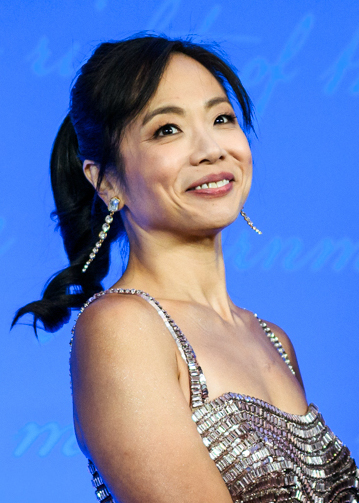
- Jiang in 2026
- Born: Jiang Weijia; June 6, 1983 (age 43); Xiamen, Fujian, China
- Citizenship: United States
- Education: College of William & Mary (BA); Syracuse University (MS)
- Occupations: News reporter; television journalist
- Years active: 2006–present
- Notable credits: WCBS-TV New York correspondent (2012–2015); CBS News White House Correspondent (2018–present)
- Title: White House Correspondent
- Spouse: Travis Luther Lowe (m. 2018)
- Children: 2

Chinese name
- Traditional Chinese: 江惟嘉
- Simplified Chinese: 江惟嘉
Transcriptions
Standard Mandarin
- Hanyu Pinyin: Jiāng Wéijiā
- Wade–Giles: Jiang^{1} Wei^{2}jia^{1}
Southern Min
- Hokkien POJ: Kiung Ói-ka

Weijia Jiang (Chinese: 江惟嘉; pinyin: Jiāng Wéijiā; born June 6, 1983) is an American television journalist and reporter. She is based in Washington, D.C., and has served since 2018 as the Senior White House Correspondent for CBS News. Jiang also served as the president of the White House Correspondents' Association from 2025 to 2026.

In 2020, Jiang's question to President Donald Trump about the COVID-19 testing program in the United States during a White House press briefing received global attention and coverage.

== Early life ==
Born in Xiamen, Fujian, China, to Liya Wei and Huade "John" Jiang, Jiang was two years old when the family immigrated to the United States. She was raised in Buckhannon, West Virginia, where her parents owned and operated a Chinese restaurant. At age 13, Jiang became interested in journalism after encouragement from her eighth-grade teacher, Dianne Williams. Together, they prepared a homemade TV show to submit to a competition run by Channel One, leading to an opportunity for Jiang to intern as a student anchor and reporter in Los Angeles for two weeks. During high school, Jiang worked on the high school video news staff under Julia Conley.

In 2005, Jiang graduated from the College of William & Mary with a bachelor's degree in philosophy and a minor in chemistry. She worked on the student-run television station WMTV and credits the university for developing her curiosity. In 2006, Jiang graduated from Syracuse University with master's degree in broadcast journalism. In 2012, she was recognized for her contributions in communications as an inductee of Newhouse School of Public Communication's Professional Gallery.

== Career ==
From 2006 to 2008, Jiang was a reporter for WBOC-TV in Salisbury, Maryland. From 2008 to 2012, she worked at WJZ-TV, Baltimore. From 2012 to 2015, Jiang worked as a general assignment reporter and fill-in anchor at WCBS-TV in New York City, where she covered the Boston Marathon bombings, the Sandy Hook Elementary School shootings, and Hurricane Sandy.

In 2013, WBZ-TV, Boston, won a regional Emmy award at the 34th News & Documentary Emmy Awards for the spot news coverage of the Newtown Tragedy which Jiang was involved in reporting. In 2014, Jiang was the Gala Dinner MC for the Outstanding 50 Asian Americans in Business Gala Dinner, which featured letters of support from Barack Obama, Andrew Cuomo, and Bill de Blasio.

In 2015, Jiang moved to Washington, D.C., to become a correspondent for Newspath, the 24-hour news gathering service for CBS News. There, she has covered major political stories such as the 2016 United States presidential elections, Barbara Bush's funeral, and the congressional baseball shooting, also extensively reporting on both the Obama and Trump administrations. In 2018, after covering President Donald Trump's G-7 Summit and the Trump administration's "zero tolerance" policy toward illegal immigration, Jiang became CBS News's White House correspondent. She has traveled with Trump on many occasions, including on Air Force One, and has covered stories including the Helsinki summit between Trump and Russian president Vladimir Putin, the Mueller Probe, the 2020 United States presidential election, and Trump's first and second impeachments.

Jiang is a member of the Asian American Journalists Association. In 2023, she was elected to an at-large board seat of the White House Correspondents' Association. She served as the organization's president from 2025 to 2026. She continued to cover the White House as a senior White House correspondent for CBS News during the Biden administration. She sat next to Trump during the 2026 White House Correspondents' Dinner shooting, and was praised by him for her hosting of the dinner.

=== Confrontations with President Trump ===
As a White House Correspondent during the first Trump administration, Jiang had several high-profile clashes with Trump. He once ended a press conference when she pushed back on his refusal to answer a question.

During a press conference on May 11, 2020, CBS News White House Correspondent Weijia Jiang asked in reference to Coronavirus testing, "Why is this a global competition to you if every day Americans are still losing their lives?", Trump replied "They're losing their lives everywhere in the world. And maybe that's a question you should ask China. Don't ask me, ask China that question, OK?"

=== Memoir ===
In 2021 it was announced that Jiang was writing a memoir, Other, about feeling otherized growing up Asian American in the United States. Originally set to be released in Spring 2022 by One Signal Publishers, an imprint of Simon & Schuster, the book has yet to materialize as of November 2026.

== Awards ==
- RTDNA Edward R. Murrow Award, Feature Reporting, "Gone But Not Forgotten", WBOC-TV, Salisbury, MD
- Chesapeake Associated Press Broadcasters' Association Contest Awards, Outstanding Feature/Human Interest, "Gone But Not Forgotten (Hooper's Island)", (co-winner with Tim Jones)

== Personal life ==
On March 17, 2018, Jiang married Travis Luther Lowe, an executive at Yelp and a donor to Democratic Party candidates and causes, in Palm Springs, California. Civil rights activist Jim Obergefell led the ceremony, which also featured a Chinese tea ceremony. Jiang and Lowe met in college, where they co-hosted a weekly campus television show. In January 2019, she gave birth to their daughter.

== See also ==
- Asian American Journalists Association
