= William Wallace Price =

American journalist

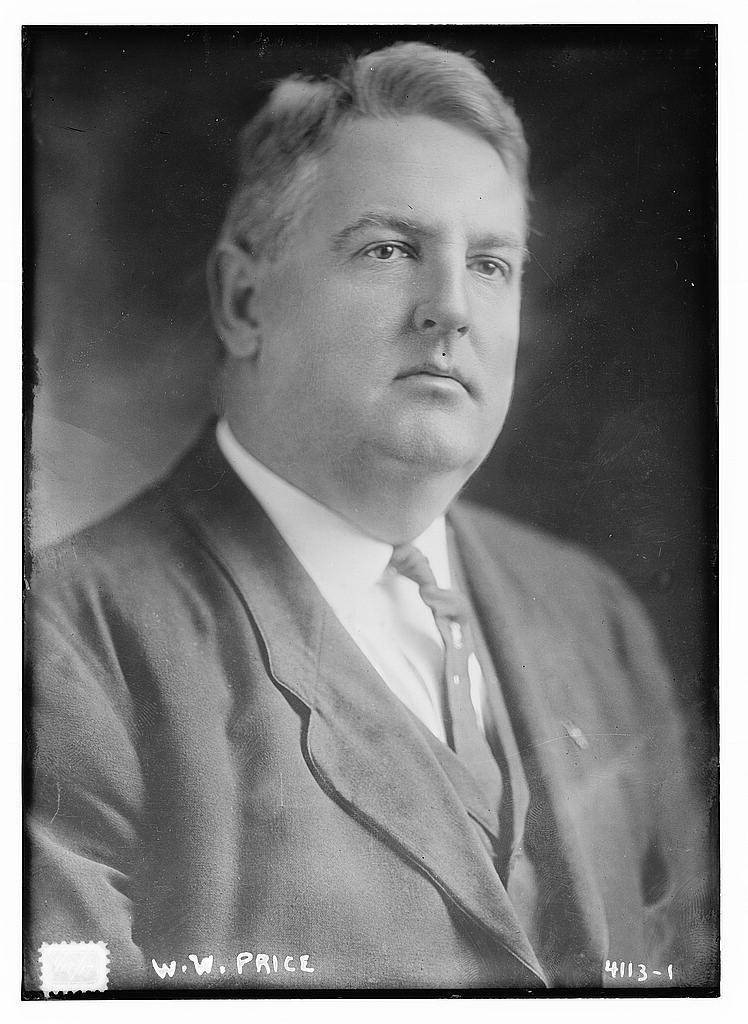

1st President of the White House Correspondents' Association
- In office 1914–1920
- Succeeded by: Frank R. Lamb

Personal details
- Born: November 11, 1867 Dahlonega, Georgia
- Died: October 24, 1931 (aged 63) Washington, DC

William Wallace Price (November 11, 1867 - October 24, 1931) was one of the first journalists to cover the White House on a full-time basis and the first to write a column devoted to the White House. He was the first president of the White House Correspondents' Association. He was responsible for the creation of the White House Press Room.

== Biography ==
William Wallace Price was born on November 11, 1867, in Dahlonega, Georgia to James Madison Price and Margaret Eliza Land. He married Minnie Allston North and they had four daughters.

He moved to Washington, DC in 1895 and joined the staff of the Washington Evening Star.

He was the first newsman to wait outside of the White House to interview people after their meetings with the president, rather than meeting those people at their hotels or offices later in the day. This way he was able to get scoops and have multiple beats. Theodore Roosevelt saw him standing in the rain on a cold day and arranged for a small room to be provided for him inside the White House. That was the start of the White House Press Room.

In 1914 he became the first president of the White House Correspondents' Association.

In 1917 he became the chief editorial writer for The Washington Times. In 1920 he was replaced as president of the White House Correspondents' Association by Frank R. Lamb.

He died on October 24, 1931, at Emergency Hospital in Washington, DC, following an operation.
