= Aldo Beckman =

American journalist (1934–1980)

- Born: December 24, 1934; Lima, Illinois, U.S.
- Died: September 10, 1980 (aged 45); Arlington, Virginia, U.S.
- Education: Bradley University; Western Illinois University
- Occupation: Journalist
- Spouse: Marijo Walsh
- Children: 1 son, 4 daughters

Aldo Beckman (December 24, 1934 – September 10, 1980) was an American journalist for the Chicago Tribune from 1959 to his death, and the president of the White House Correspondents' Association in 1978–1979.

== Life ==
Beckman was born in Lima, Illinois circa 1934. He attended Bradley University, and he graduated from Western Illinois University.

Beckman joined the Chicago Tribune as a court reporter in 1959. He joined their Washington, D.C. bureau in 1965 and eventually became the bureau chief. He won the Edward Scott Beck award in 1966 and 1972, and he served as the president of the White House Correspondents' Association in 1978–1979.

Beckman married Marijo Walsh. They had a son and four daughters, and they resided in Arlington, Virginia. Beckman died of cancer on September 10, 1980, in Arlington, at age 45.

Starting in 1981, the Aldo Beckman Memorial Award was named in his honor, given annually by the White House Correspondents' Association "to a Washington reporter 'who personifies the journalistic excellence as well as the personal qualities exemplified by Mr. Beckman'."
