= Lou Cannon =

American journalist, author and biographer (1933–2025)

- Born: Louis Simeon Cannon; June 3, 1933; New York City, U.S.
- Died: December 19, 2025 (aged 92); Santa Barbara, California, U.S.
- Occupations: Journalist; biographer
- Spouses: Virginia Oprian (m. 1953; div. 1983); Mary Shinkwin (m. 1985)
- Children: 4, including Carl
- Writing career
- Subjects: Politics of California; Politics of the United States; Ronald Reagan

Louis Simeon Cannon (June 3, 1933 – December 19, 2025) was an American journalist, non-fiction author, and biographer who was state bureau chief for the San Jose Mercury News in the late 1960s, and later senior White House correspondent of The Washington Post during the presidency of Ronald Reagan. He was a prolific biographer of Ronald Reagan, having written five books about him. Cannon was a columnist and editorial advisor to State Net Capitol Journal, a weekly publication focused on state legislation and politics.

== Background ==
Louis Simeon Cannon was born on June 3, 1933, in Manhattan, New York, and was raised in Fallon, Nevada, and Reno, Nevada. He was educated at the University of Nevada, Reno, before transferring to San Francisco State College.

== Career ==
After service in the United States Army, Cannon began his journalistic career in the late 1950s. In 1961, he joined The San Jose Mercury News, where he covered state politics. This began his longstanding coverage of Ronald Reagan, who was elected the state's governor in 1966.

Cannon moved to Washington, D.C., in 1969 to join Ridder Publications Inc., and went to The Washington Post three years later. After covering the White House for many years, he, like Reagan, returned to California at the end of the 1980s. Cannon retired from the Post in the late 1990s, after which he worked on books and freelance articles. From 2005 until 2021, he wrote a column for the Sacramento State Net Capitol Journal.

== Personal life and death ==
Cannon married Virginia Oprian in 1953, with whom he had four children, including Carl M. Cannon, before divorcing in 1983. Two years later, he married Mary Shinkwin.

Cannon died from a stroke at a hospice facility in Santa Barbara, California, on December 19, 2025, at the age of 92.

== Publications ==
External videos
- Part One of Booknotes interview with Lou Cannon on President Reagan: The Role of a Lifetime, May 12, 1991, C-SPAN
- Part Two of interview with Cannon, May 19, 1991, C-SPAN

- Ronnie and Jesse: A Political Odyssey (New York: Doubleday, 1969) LCCN 78-87099
- The McCloskey Challenge (1972)
- Reporting: An Inside View (1977)
- Reagan (1982)
- President Reagan: The Role of a Lifetime (1991)
- Official Negligence: How Rodney King and the Riots Changed Los Angeles and the LAPD (1998)
- Ronald Reagan: The Presidential Portfolio: History as Told through the Collection of the Ronald Reagan Library and Museum (2001)
- Governor Reagan: His Rise to Power (2003)

== See also ==
- Santa Barbara News-Press controversy
