= Jeanne Cummings =

American journalist

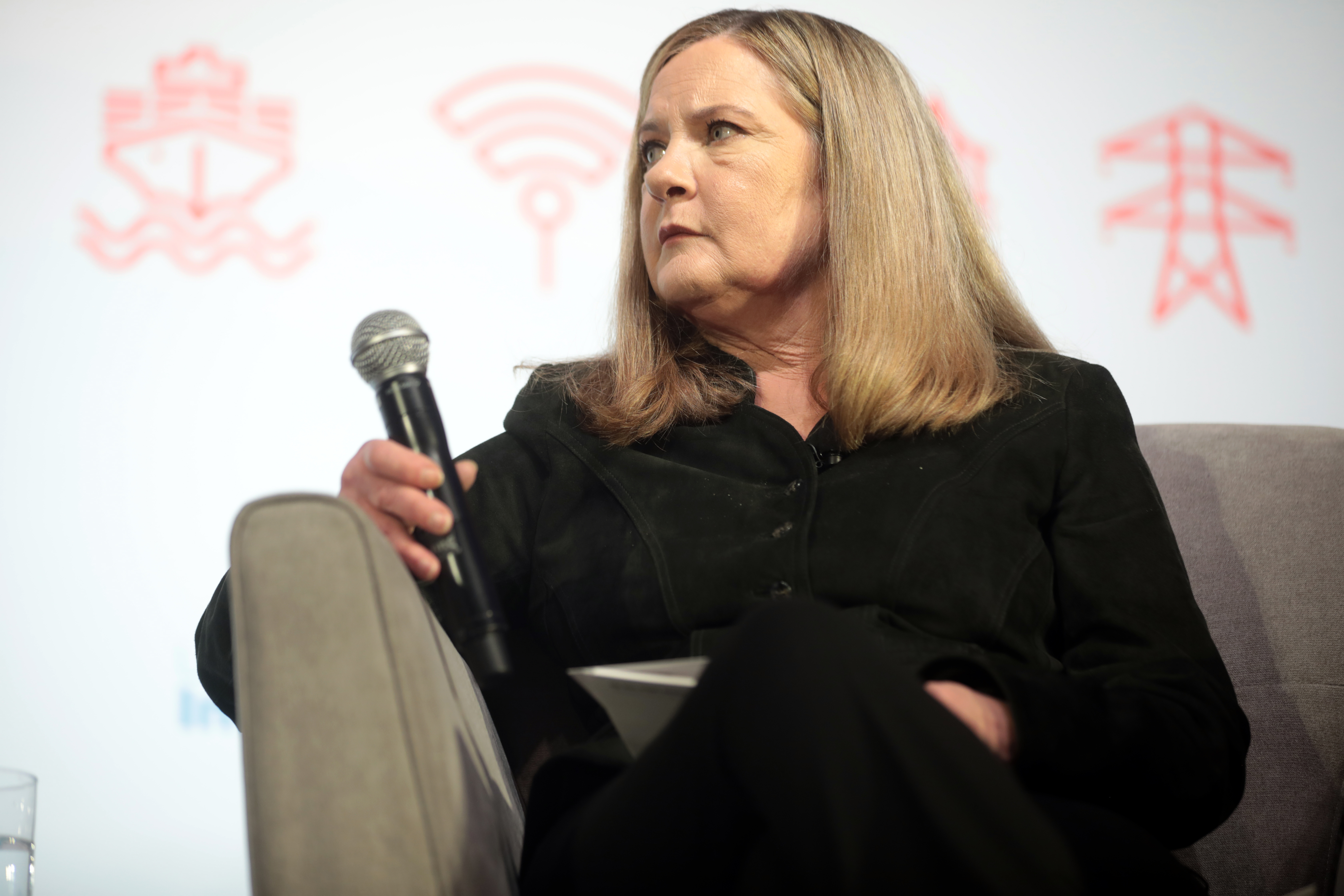
- Cummings in February 2020
- Education: University of Maryland (BA)
- Occupations: Political journalist, columnist
- Employers: Atlanta Journal-Constitution; The Wall Street Journal; Politico; Bloomberg News
- Awards: Aldo Beckman Memorial Award; 2000

Jeanne Cummings is an American political journalist and columnist who has served as a deputy bureau chief of The Wall Street Journal's Washington, D.C., news bureau. Until June 2015, when she returned to the Wall Street Journal, she was reporter and Government Team Deputy Editor at Bloomberg News in Washington, D.C. She joined Bloomberg in 2011, and in 2014 served as liaison between Bloomberg's Washington operation and the Mark Halperin-and-John Heilemann-led Bloomberg Politics project. More recently, she had been writing columns for Bloomberg.

Previously she was assistant managing editor for the Politico news organization. Cummings is a frequent panelist on the PBS political discussion program Washington Week. Earlier, she had served on the Washington bureaus of The Atlanta Journal-Constitution and The Wall Street Journal. She left the Wall Street Journal for Politico in 2007.

She is the recipient of the 2000 Aldo Beckman Memorial Award, awarded by the White House Correspondents Association.

Cummings is a native of Maryland. She graduated cum laude from the University of Maryland in 1979 with a bachelor's degree in journalism and a minor in political science.
