= Glenn Thrush =

American journalist (born 1967)

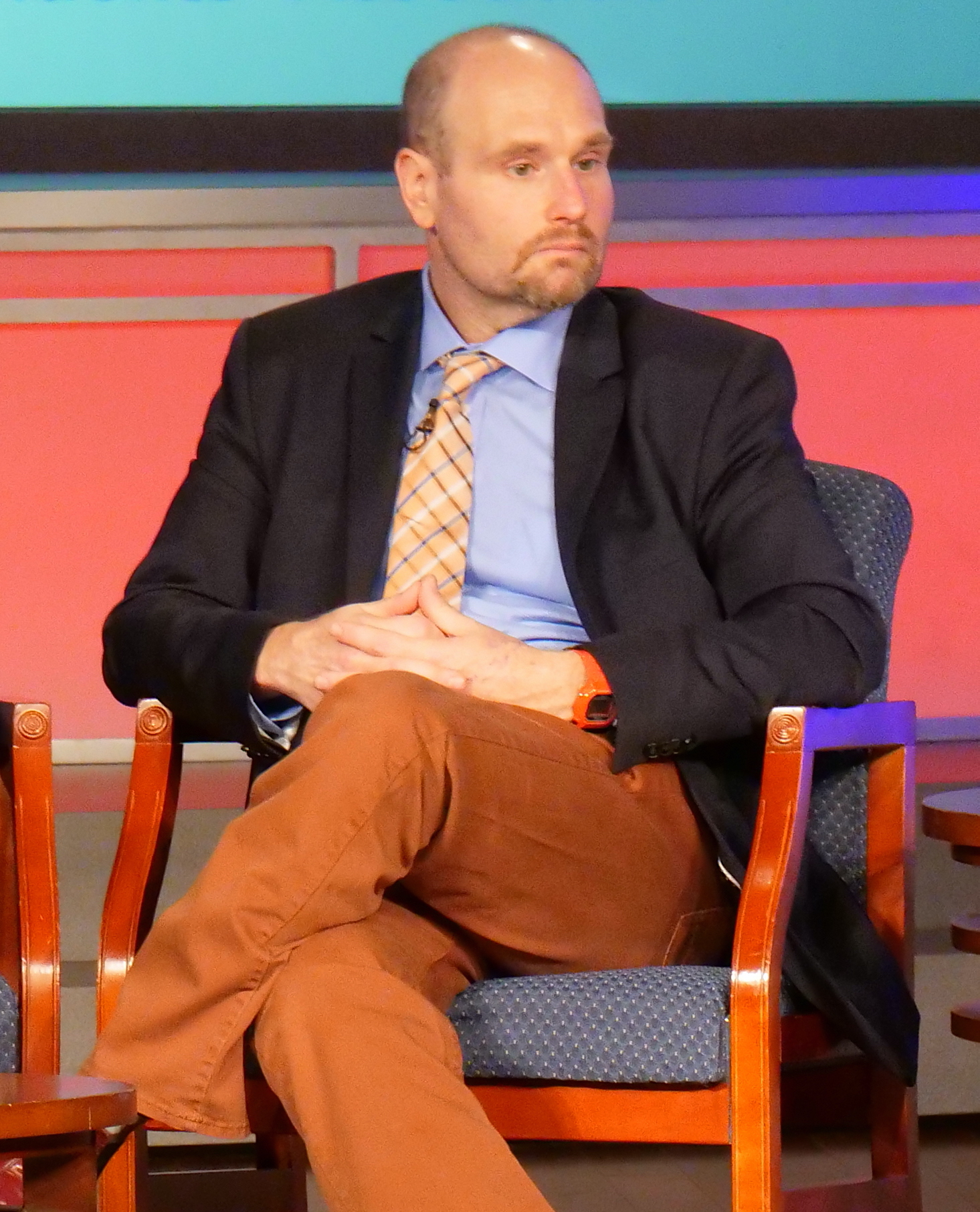
- Thrush in 2017
- Born: April 6, 1967 (age 59); United States
- Education: Brooklyn College (BA)
- Occupations: Journalist, correspondent
- Writing career
- Language: English
- Genres: Journalism, politics

Glenn Thrush (born April 6, 1967) is an American journalist, pundit, and author. He is a reporter for The New York Times covering the Department of Justice and was formerly a White House correspondent. He is also a contributor for MSNBC, and was previously chief political correspondent at Politico and a senior staff writer for Politico Magazine.

In late 2017, The New York Times suspended Thrush while the paper investigated allegations of sexually inappropriate behavior reported in Vox. Thrush was allowed to return several months later in a different position from his prior White House beat.

== Early life and education ==
Thrush grew up in Sheepshead Bay, in the borough of Brooklyn, New York, and attended Sheepshead Bay High School, from which he graduated in 1984. His parents owned a Carvel Ice Cream store in Brighton Beach, Brooklyn. Thrush graduated from Brooklyn College, where he majored in political science and Greek classics. Thrush identifies as a secular Jew.

== Career ==
Thrush started his reporting career working for the lower Manhattan weekly newspaper Downtown Express. He was an education and politics reporter for the now defunct Post Herald in Birmingham, Alabama, and later a reporter and editor for the New York policy journal City Limits, where he covered low income housing and child welfare during the administration of Mayor Rudy Giuliani. He joined Bloomberg News to cover the New York City hospital industry in the early 00s, and later worked for Newsday as a City Hall reporter, covering Mayor Michael Bloomberg.

Thrush covered Hillary Clinton's presidential campaign in 2008 for Newsday, and then joined Politico in July 2008. In December 2016, it was reported that Thrush would be joining The New York Times covering the White House starting on January 3, 2017. Thrush was suspended from his position in November 2017 amid allegations of sexual misconduct. In January 2018, he returned to The New York Times after a two-month suspension.

Thrush wrote two e-books about President Barack Obama's 2012 reelection campaign. Obama's Last Stand was published in August 2012, and The End of the Line: Romney vs. Obama: The 34 days that Decided the Election was published after the election in December 2012.

=== Podesta e-mail hack ===
Thrush came under criticism after emails released by Wikileaks (the Podesta emails) showed Thrush sending John Podesta portions of a draft article that dealt with Podesta, asking that he fact-check those portions. Thrush also wrote, "No worries Because I have become a hack I will send u the whole section that pertains to u. Please don't share or tell anyone I did this Tell me if I fucked up anything." Podesta did not ask for any changes, writing back "no problems here". Politico spokesman Brad Dayspring responded to the criticism, saying "Politico's policy is to not share editorial content pre-publication except as approved by editors... Checking the relevant passages for accuracy was responsible and consistent with our standards; Sharing the full piece was a mistake and not consistent with our policies."

Thrush replied on Twitter that "checking if a portion of a story that pertained to him was accurate... I DO THIS WITH EVERYBODY." Dayspring said that "Glenn is one of the top political reporters in the country, in no small part because he understands that it is his job to get inside information, not appear perfect when someone illegally hacks email... I can speak with firsthand knowledge and experience that Glenn checks the validity of often complex reporting with everybody, on both sides of the aisle."

=== Sexual misconduct allegations and suspension ===
In November 2017, Vox published an article containing the accounts of four female journalists who said that Thrush engaged in inappropriate sexual behavior toward them. The incidents recounted in the Vox story about Thrush involve four women over a five-year period while he worked at Politico, and the women alleged Thrush groped and kissed them against their will. One woman alleged Thrush engaged in office gossip about her following an unwanted kiss. In a statement published on his Facebook page, Thrush disputed gossiping about the woman. After the publication of the article, The New York Times suspended Thrush, who issued a statement that read in part: "Over the past several years, I have responded to a succession of personal and health crises by drinking heavily. During that period, I have done things that I am ashamed of, actions that have brought great hurt to my family and friends. I have not taken a drink since June 15, 2017, have resumed counseling and will soon begin outpatient treatment for alcoholism. I am working hard to repair the damage I have done." The Times issued a statement saying, "We support his decision to enter a substance-abuse program."

On December 20, 2017, The New York Times reported after an investigation that Thrush was permanently removed from covering the White House and would remain suspended until late January 2018. The Times specified Thrush would be reassigned to a beat about the "social safety net in the age of Trump, particularly HUD and HHS." It has been noted Thrush was moved to a subject that greatly affects women and that covering the social safety net is considered a "punishment" or demotion from covering the White House. He was also required to undergo unspecified "training designed to improve his workplace conduct," according to a statement by Times Executive Editor Dean Baquet. The behavioral inquiry interviewed 30 people from inside and outside of the newspaper in Washington and New York and was led by an internal attorney Charlotte Behrendt. Carolyn Ryan, an assistant managing editor at The Times, said of the inquiry, "The people who worked most closely with Glenn in the bureau—men, women, young, old—were supportive of him and did believe that he could contribute and hadn’t seen the kind of behavior that had been described."

== Personal life ==
Thrush is married to Diane Webber, an editor at NPR, and lives in Kensington, Maryland. They have twin sons.

== In popular culture ==
Thrush was portrayed by Bobby Moynihan in multiple episodes of Saturday Night Live, interacting with White House Press Secretary Sean Spicer (Melissa McCarthy). Thrush credits the SNL portrayal for raising his profile and said that "it probably gets my phone calls answered a little bit more quickly."
