= Tamara Keith =

American journalist (born 1979)

Tamara Dawnell Keith
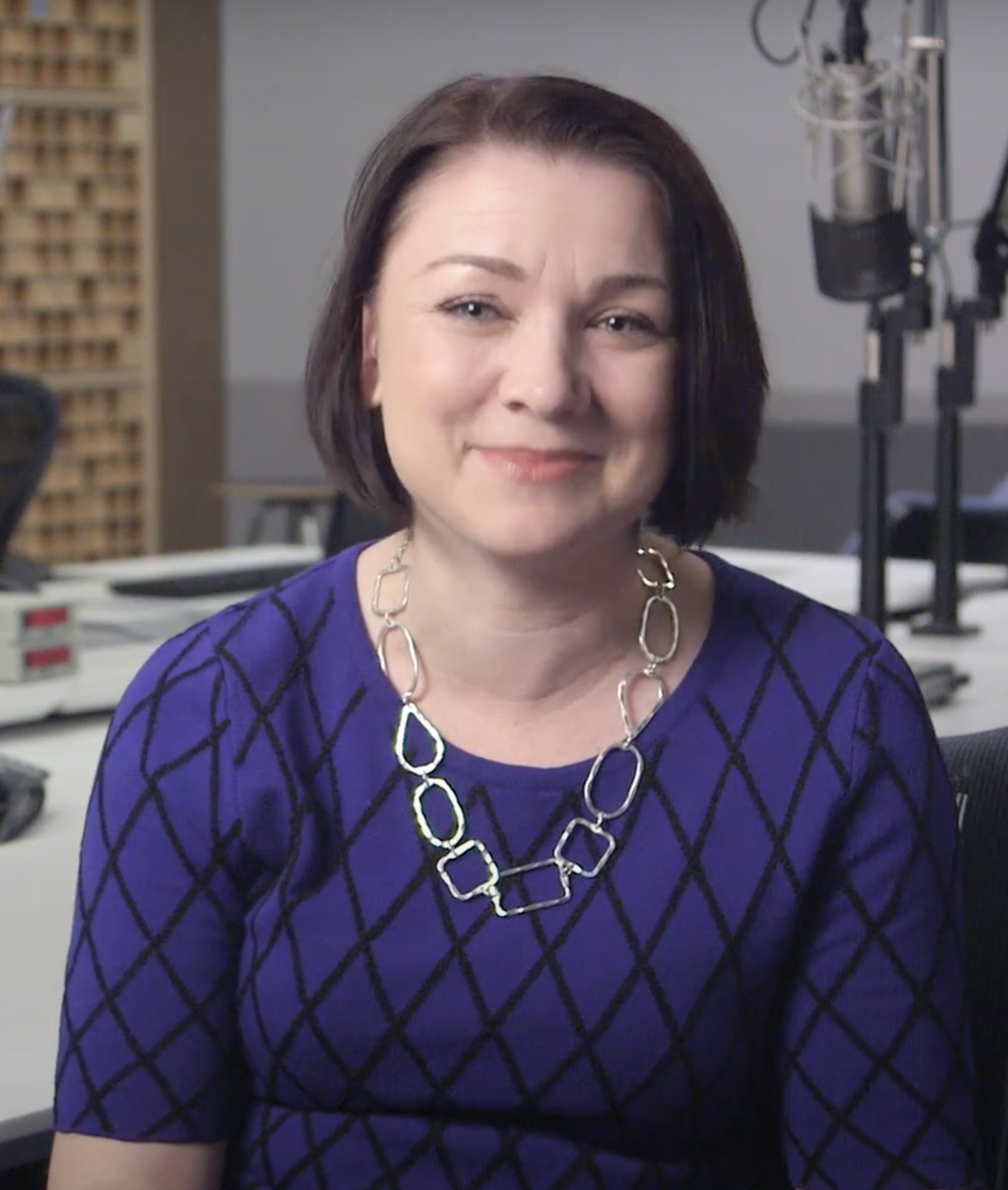
- Keith in 2020
- Born: September 25, 1979 (age 46)
- Education: University of California, Berkeley (BA, MS)
- Occupation: Journalist
- Height: 5 ft 6 in (168 cm)
- Spouse: Ira Gordon

Tamara Dawnell Keith (/ˈtæmərə/; born September 25, 1979) is an American journalist. She is the White House correspondent for NPR and co-hosts The NPR Politics Podcast with Scott Detrow. She regularly appears on the PBS NewsHour weekly segment "Politics Monday". Keith is on the board of the White House Correspondents' Association, of which she served as president in 2022 and ‘23.

== Early life ==
Tamara Keith was born on September 25, 1979. Keith's family moved to Hanford, California, when she was eight years old. She started in radio as a "teen essayist" for NPR’s Weekend Edition Sunday. She graduated from high school early, received a bachelor's degree in philosophy from the University of California, Berkeley in three years, and enrolled at the Berkeley Graduate School of Journalism at age 19. Keith has a graduate degree in journalism from the University of California, Berkeley.

== Career ==
Keith has worked for KQED, WOSU-FM, and KPCC. She covered the 2010 Haiti earthquake and hosted B-side Radio, a 72-episode public radio podcast, from 2001 until 2010.

In 2007, Keith received first-place in the category "Outstanding Story, Radio" for "Overcrowded Prisons' Wastewater Poses Environmental Hazard (Mule Creek Prison)" on The California Report from the Society of Environmental Journalists in the sixth annual contest.

In 2009, Keith joined NPR as a business reporter. From 2022 to 2023, Keith was the president of the White House Correspondents' Association, succeeding Steven Portnoy.

== Personal life ==
Keith's husband, Ira Gordon, is a cancer researcher and veterinarian. Keith was raised Methodist and is a convert to Judaism, the religion of her husband.
