= Edward-Isaac Dovere =

American journalist

- Born: July 12, 1980 (age 46)
- Education: Johns Hopkins University (BA); University of Chicago (MA)
- Spouse: Sarah Slobodien

Edward-Isaac Dovere (born July 12, 1980) is an American journalist who is a senior reporter for CNN. He was previously a staff writer for The Atlantic and Chief Washington Correspondent for Politico.

== Biography ==
After growing up in Manhattan, Dovere graduated with a B.A. from Johns Hopkins University and received a M.A. in intellectual history from the University of Chicago. He is the founding editor of Manhattan Media publications City Hall and The Capitol (now City and State). In 2018, he won the Merriman Smith Memorial Award for an article written while he was covering Barack Obama's trip to Havana.

His book about the Democratic Party and the 2020 United States presidential election, Battle for the Soul: Inside the Democrats' Campaigns to Defeat Trump, was published in May 2021 by Penguin Random House.

== Personal life ==
In 2011, he married Sarah Margalit Slobodien, both are Jewish.
