= Philip Crowther =

British-German-Luxembourgish journalist

- Crowther reporting in Portuguese for Voice of America
- Born: 1981; Luxembourg
- Education: Athénée de Luxembourg, King's College London, University of the Arts London
- Occupation: Journalist
- Awards: Officer of the Ordre de Mérite du Grand-Duché de Luxembourg (2022)
- Website: www.philipcrowther.com

Philip Crowther is a British-German-Luxembourgish-American journalist, notable for being a polyglot. He has publicly spoken in fluent French, Spanish, Portuguese, English, German, and Luxembourgish. He is the White House correspondent for France 24, international affiliate correspondent for the Associated Press, and is a member of the White House Correspondents' Association.

== Early life and education ==
Crowther was born in Luxembourg to a British father and German mother. His father and mother spoke only English and German to him, respectively. He was educated in Luxembourg at the Athénée de Luxembourg, becoming fluent in French, German, English and Luxembourgish. At the age of 14, he started learning Spanish out of an interest in Spanish football. During a gap year after high school, he went to Barcelona where he learned some Catalan. He learned Portuguese at university, studying at King's College London, from which he graduated with Hispanic Studies.

== Career ==
In 2006, he worked as a sports reporter for the Uruguayan newspaper El País. From 2007 to 2008, he majored in Broadcast Journalism at the University of the Arts, London as a graduate student. From 2008 to 2011, he worked as a reporter for France 24 in Paris.

Since June 2011, he has been based in Washington, D.C., and has traveled to other regions and countries to cover breaking news.

In 2018, he joined the Associated Press' Global Media Services as an "international affiliate correspondent", a position tailored specifically for him. He provides live coverage in six languages to broadcasters around the world.

On 25 May 2021, the one-year anniversary of the murder of George Floyd, Crowther was reporting live from the scene of the killing when gunfire erupted. He was unharmed. In 2020, he was invited to become a member of the International Association of Hyperpolyglots (HYPIA) in recognition of his multilingual reporting, and on June 1, 2021, he became a member.

In February 2022, he reported from Kyiv in six different languages during coverage of the 2021–2022 Russo-Ukrainian crisis, which brought him mainstream attention and gained him 70,000 more Twitter followers.

== Awards ==
- The Professional Excellence Award, by the Association of Foreign Press Correspondents in the USA (2021)

== Personal life ==
Crowther's parents live in Luxembourg and his sister lives in Germany. He has a daughter. He became a Luxembourg citizen in 2019, when his father, a British citizen, acquired the citizenship before Brexit. He also holds United States citizenship.
