= Obama's Last Stand =

Book by Glenn Thrush

- Author: Glenn Thrush
- Language: English
- Genre: Political
- Publisher: Kindle
- Publication place: United States
- English publication date: 2012
- Media type: E-book

Obama's Last Stand is an e-book written by Politico's then-White House correspondent Glenn Thrush on Barack Obama. The book deals with the Barack Obama presidential campaign, 2012 and the tactics which he will use in the campaign and also deals with the differences within the campaign team.
