= Steven Portnoy =

American journalist

- Born: 1981 (age 44–45)
- Education: Syracuse University
- Occupation: Radio journalist
- Years active: 1999–present
- Title: National Correspondent, ABC News

Steven Portnoy (born 1981) is a national correspondent for ABC News Radio. He previously covered Congress and the White House for CBS News Radio and served as president of the White House Correspondents’ Association from 2021 to 2022.

== Early life and career ==
Raised in South Brunswick, New Jersey, Portnoy graduated from South Brunswick High School in 1999 and received the school's Distinguished Alumni Award in 2012.

Portnoy reported for WSYR-AM and produced at WSTM-TV and WIXT-TV (now WSYR-TV) while he was a student at the S.I. Newhouse School for Public Communications at Syracuse University.

From 2003 until 2006, Portnoy reported for ABC-owned WMAL Radio in Washington, where he covered local news in the greater Washington area.

Beginning in 2006, Portnoy covered legal affairs and breaking stories for ABC News Radio. He was also a regular host of Ahead of the Curve, a technology-based talk show on ABC News Now, the network's 24/7 digital TV platform.

In 2015, Portnoy became a congressional correspondent for CBS News Radio. He was later tasked with covering both the Trump and Biden administrations. In July 2019, Portnoy was elected to a three-year term on the board of the White House Correspondents' Association, serving as its president from July 2021-July 2022. He hosted the WHCA's first dinner after the COVID-19 pandemic, which featured Trevor Noah as the headline entertainer.

In 2023, Portnoy returned to ABC News Radio as a national correspondent. He helped lead the network's reporting on the 2024 presidential election, covered each of Donald Trump's criminal trials and makes regular appearances on the daily ABC News podcast, "Start Here."

== Awards and recognition ==
In 2001, while a college student, Portnoy took first place at the Hearst Journalism Awards for his reporting on the economic downturn in the early part of the decade. He was honored by the Bayliss Broadcasting Foundation with the Bayliss Horizon Award in 2005. In 2008, Portnoy was named a Peter Jennings Fellow at the National Constitution Center in Philadelphia.

Over his career, Portnoy has won several local and regional awards and shared in national Edward R. Murrow awards for breaking news coverage in 2007 (Virginia Tech massacre), 2011 (anchoring the network's radio coverage of the death of Osama bin Laden), and 2013 (Boston Marathon bombing), and for continuing coverage (Hurricane Sandy) in 2012.

In 2023, Portnoy wrote and produced "Who Killed George Polk?" a three-part audio documentary on the 1948 murder of the CBS News correspondent. The program took first place honors at the National Headliner Awards in 2024.

In November 2025, the Library of American Broadcasting Foundation presented Portnoy with its Excellence in Broadcast Preservation Award.
