= Mark Knoller =

American broadcast journalist (1952–2025)

- Born: February 20, 1952; New York City, U.S.
- Died: August 30, 2025 (aged 73); Washington, D.C., U.S.
- Education: New York University
- Occupation: Journalist
- Years active: 1975–2020
- Employers: Associated Press (1975–1988); CBS News (1988–2020)

Mark Nathan Knoller (February 20, 1952 – August 30, 2025) was an American broadcast journalist who covered the White House. His career spanned nearly five decades, including 32 years he devoted to reporting for CBS Radio News. Knoller also made occasional appearances on CBS Television News, especially if he was the day's pool reporter for the White House press corps. He was known for gathering statistics on the daily activities of U.S. presidents beginning in 1996.

== Early life ==
Mark Nathan Knoller was born in Brooklyn, New York, on February 20, 1952, and graduated from New York University.

== Career ==
Knoller's first reporting job was with the Associated Press's radio division in 1975. He joined CBS in 1988. While living in New York in the 1970s, he traveled by train to South Belmar, New Jersey to work weekend news shifts at radio station WADB-FM. In later years, he began using Twitter as a primary outlet for his reporting when issues with his voice impeded his broadcasting abilities.

Knoller was known for meticulously cataloguing the daily activities of each president, keeping tallies of every sort of public appearance, comment, and activity over the years. He began doing so in 1996, when Bill Clinton was visiting California, and Knoller discovered that there was no easy way to find out how many times he had previously visited the state. In 2012, Washingtonian magazine dubbed him "the unofficial White House statistician", and noted that "reporters, presidential staffers, and even press secretaries" routinely sought information from him.

On May 28, 2020, it was reported that CBS had laid off Knoller. He tweeted that day that he was still on the job and was waiting to see what he would do next. The layoff was greeted by a tremendous outpouring of support for Knoller from all sides of the political divide.

== Personal life ==
Knoller suffered from diabetes, and in the 2000s had to have two toes amputated as a result of complications from a foot injury he sustained while working.

After a period of declining health, Knoller died at a Washington hospital on August 30, 2025, at the age of 73.
