= Zeke Miller =

American journalist

Zeke J. Miller
- Education: Yale University
- Occupation: Journalist
- Years active: 2011-present
- Employer: Associated Press

Zeke Miller is an American journalist and past president of the White House Correspondents Association. Miller is a White House reporter for the Associated Press.

== Education ==
Miller received a B.A. in Political Science from Yale University in 2011 where he was an editor and reporter at the Yale Daily News.

== Career ==
Miller began his career as a journalist reporting for the Yale Daily News. His experience allowed him to secure an internship on the business desk at The Hartford Courant and on the Long Island desk at Newsday. He joined Business Insider as a reporter in 2011 but moved to BuzzFeed News within a year to become a political reporter.

Miller joined TIME as a political reporter in 2013 and was promoted to White House correspondent for the magazine in 2016. His experiences as among the youngest correspondents on the campaign at the time led to him being featured in a report on millennial journalists published in The New York Times.

Miller became a White House reporter for The Associated Press in 2017 as part of its national politics team.

On January 20, 2017 Miller incorrectly reported that President Trump had removed the bust of civil rights leader Martin Luther King Jr. from the Oval Office. Miller later issued a correction and tweeted taking responsibility for his mistake. He apologized in person, via email, and on Twitter. Miller also asked a White House advisor to pass along his apology to the president.

Miller shared an award from the White House Correspondents' Association in 2022 for "Excellence in Presidential News Coverage Under Deadline Pressure."
