= Merriman Smith =

American journalist

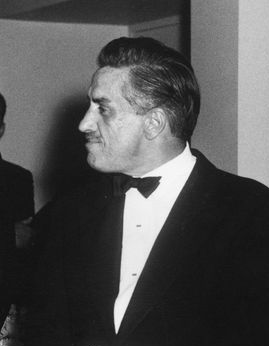
- Smith in 1962
- Born: February 10, 1913; Savannah, Georgia
- Died: April 13, 1970 (aged 57); Washington, D.C.
- Occupation: Journalist
- Awards: Pulitzer Prize; Presidential Medal of Freedom

Albert Merriman Smith (February 10, 1913 – April 13, 1970) was an American wire service reporter, notably serving as White House correspondent for United Press International and its predecessor, United Press. He won the Pulitzer Prize in 1964 for his coverage of the assassination of John F. Kennedy and was awarded the Presidential Medal of Freedom in 1969 by Lyndon B. Johnson.

== Background ==
Albert Merriman Smith was born on February 10, 1913, in Savannah, Georgia.

== Career ==
Known by his middle name (and his nickname, "Smitty"), Smith covered US presidents from Franklin Delano Roosevelt to Richard Nixon and originated the practice of closing presidential news conferences with "Thank You, Mr. President," which was the title of his 1946 book, written during his coverage of the Harry Truman administration. That honor, accorded the senior wire service reporter present at presidential news conferences, became more popularly known when it was continued by Smith's UPI colleague Helen Thomas.

Smith began covering the White House in 1940. After the United States entered the Second World War, he was designated as one of the wire service reporters to follow the president on all his travels. They agreed for security purposes not to file their stories until after each trip had ended. Consequently, Smith was in Warm Springs, Georgia, on April 12, 1945, and filed one of the first reports on the death of President Franklin D. Roosevelt.

On November 22, 1963, Smith was the main UPI reporter in Dallas for John F. Kennedy's visit. He traveled in the motorcade in the White House Pool car, which had a radiotelephone. When the shots were fired, Smith grabbed the phone and called the UPI office. He stayed on the phone while Jack Bell, the AP reporter in the car, started punching Smith and yelling at him to hand the phone over. At 12:34 PM CST, four minutes after the presidential shooting, the report went out over UPI wire. In 1964, he received the Pulitzer Prize for his coverage of the assassination of US President John F. Kennedy. He was the first to publicly use the term "grassy knoll" regarding the assassination.

In the 1960s, Smith was a frequent guest on television interview programs hosted by Jack Paar and Merv Griffin. Smith was presented with the Presidential Medal of Freedom by President Lyndon Johnson in 1969.

== Death ==
Despondent over the death of his son in the Vietnam War and perhaps suffering from PTSD as a result of witnessing the Kennedy assassination, Smith died at his home in Alexandria, Virginia, on April 13, 1970, from a self-inflicted gunshot wound. Although he never served in the military himself, his grave is in Section 32 of Arlington National Cemetery next to his son's, by special permission of the Commanding General of the Military District of Washington.

At the end of the President's press conference of May 8, 1970, concentrating on the Kent State shootings and his decision to expand the war into Cambodia, Nixon called on the White House press corps to stand in Smith's remembrance.

== Merriman Smith Memorial Award ==
In 1970, the White House Correspondents' Association established The Merriman Smith Memorial Award for excellence in presidential news coverage under deadline pressure. His name was removed from the award in 2022 because of his support of excluding Black and female journalists from membership in the National Press Club and from attending the White House Correspondents' Dinner.

== Works ==
- Thank You, Mr. President: A White House Notebook (1946, 1976)
  - Danke sehr, Herr Präsident! Notizbuch aus dem Weissen Haus (1948)
- President is Many Men (1948)
- Meet Mister Eisenhower (1955)
- President's Odyssey (1961, 1975)
- Good New Days (1962)
- News Media – A Service and a Force (1970)
- Merriman Smith's Book of Presidents: A White House Memoir (1972)

== See also ==
- 1964 Pulitzer Prize
