= Rebecca Ballhaus =

American journalist

- Born: July 1991 (age 34); New York City, U.S.
- Education: Brown University (BA)
- Years active: 2011–present
- Employer: The Wall Street Journal
- Title: Reporter

Rebecca Ballhaus (born July 1991) is a two-time Pulitzer Prize-winning American journalist who covers the White House for The Wall Street Journal.

== Early life ==
Ballhaus was born in New York City to German cinematographer Florian Ballhaus and screenwriter Pamela Katz. She is the granddaughter to the famous German cinematographer Michael Ballhaus. She attended Berkeley Carroll School and received a B.A. in Political Science from Brown University in 2013.

== Career ==
Ballhaus began her journalism career as an intern at the Huffington Post while still an undergraduate at Brown. She later became the managing editor of The Brown Daily Herald, the university newspaper.

Ballhaus joined The Wall Street Journal as a summer intern in 2013. She was made a full-time reporter at the Washington bureau three months later, and covered the 2016 election as a national political reporter.

Since 2017, Ballhaus has covered the White House and money in politics. She has frequently appeared on CNN, MSNBC and NPR as a political analyst. In 2019, along with other members of the Wall Street Journal, Rebecca won a Pulitzer Prize for her coverage of Trump's direction of payments from Michael Cohen to Stormy Daniels. This work ultimately lead to President Trump's felony conviction in 2024.

In 2023, she was awarded her second Pulitzer Prize for her coverage of conflicts of interest arising from stock trading among federal officials.
