= Truthiness =

Belief in truth based on only intuition

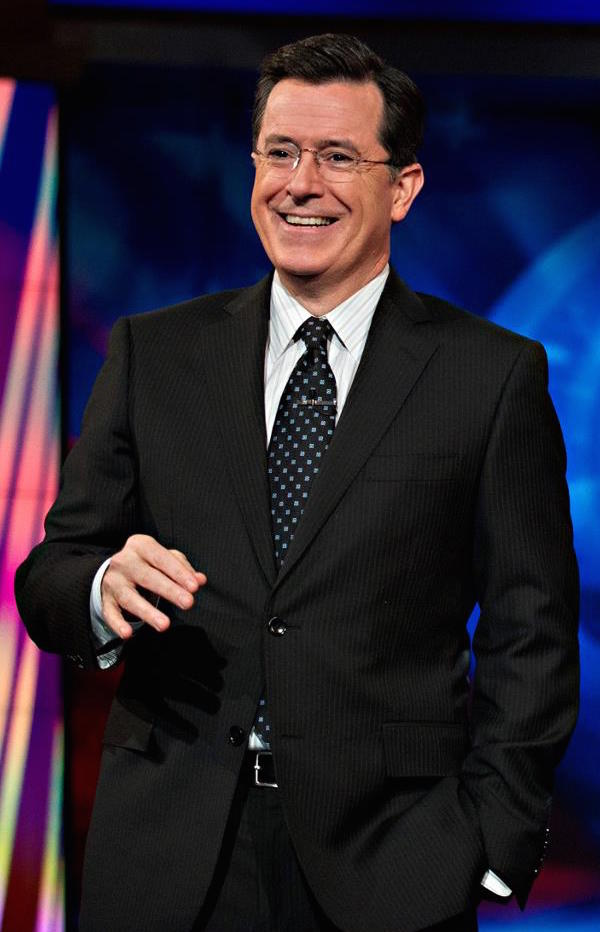
Stephen Colbert coined the term truthiness on his political satire show The Colbert Report.

Truthiness is the belief or assertion that a particular statement is true based on the intuition or perceptions of some individual or individuals, without regard to evidence, logic, intellectual examination, or facts. Truthiness can range from ignorant assertions of falsehoods to deliberate duplicity or propaganda intended to sway opinions.

The concept of truthiness has emerged as a major subject of discussion surrounding U.S. politics during the late 20th and early 21st centuries due to the increasing perception among observers of a rise in propaganda and a growing hostility toward factual reporting and fact-based discussion.

== Etymology ==
American television comedian Stephen Colbert coined the term truthiness in this meaning as the subject of a segment called "The Wørd" during the pilot episode of his political satire program The Colbert Report on October 17, 2005. By using this as part of his routine, Colbert satirized the misuse of appeal to emotion and "gut feeling" as a rhetorical device in contemporaneous socio-political discourse. He particularly applied it to U.S. President George W. Bush's nomination of Harriet Miers to the Supreme Court and the decision to invade Iraq in 2003. Colbert later ascribed truthiness to other institutions and organizations, including Wikipedia. Colbert has sometimes used a Dog Latin version of the term, Veritasiness. For example, in Colbert's "Operation Iraqi Stephen: Going Commando", the word Veritasiness can be seen on the banner above the eagle on the operation's seal.

Truthiness was named Word of the Year for 2005 by the American Dialect Society and for 2006 by Merriam-Webster. Linguist and OED consultant Benjamin Zimmer pointed out that the word truthiness already had a history in literature and appears in the Oxford English Dictionary (OED), as a derivation of truthy, and The Century Dictionary, both of which indicate it as rare or dialectal, and to be defined more straightforwardly as "truthfulness, faithfulness". Responding to claims by Michael Adams that the word already existed with a different meaning, Colbert, presumably exploiting his definition of the word, said, "Truthiness is a word I pulled right out of my keister".

== Use by Stephen Colbert ==
Stephen Colbert, portraying his character Dr. Stephen T. Colbert, chose the word truthiness just moments before taping the premiere episode of The Colbert Report on October 17, 2005, after deciding the originally scripted word, truth, was not absolutely ridiculous enough: "We're not talking about truth, we're talking about something that seems like truth—the truth we want to exist", he explained. He introduced his definition in the first segment of the episode, saying: "Now I'm sure some of the 'word police', the 'wordinistas' over at Webster's are gonna say, 'Hey, that's not a word'. Well, anybody who knows me knows I'm no fan of dictionaries or reference books. They're elitist. Constantly telling us what is or isn't true. Or what did or didn't happen."

When asked in an out-of-character interview with The Onion's A.V. Club for his views on "the 'truthiness' imbroglio that's tearing our country apart", Colbert elaborated on the critique he intended to convey with the word:

Truthiness is tearing apart our country, and I don't mean the argument over who came up with the word …

It used to be, everyone was entitled to their own opinion, but not their own facts. But that's not the case anymore. Facts matter not at all. Perception is everything. It's certainty. People love the President [George W. Bush] because he's certain of his choices as a leader, even if the facts that back him up don't seem to exist. It's the fact that he's certain that is very appealing to a certain section of the country. I really feel a dichotomy in the American populace. What is important? What you want to be true, or what is true? …

Truthiness is 'What I say is right, and [nothing] anyone else says could possibly be true.' It's not only that I feel it to be true, but that I feel it to be true. There's not only an emotional quality, but there's a selfish quality.

During an interview on December 8, 2006, with Charlie Rose, Colbert stated:

I was thinking of the idea of passion and emotion and certainty over information. And what you feel in your gut, as I said in the first Wørd we did, which was sort of a thesis statement of the whole show – however long it lasts – is that sentence, that one word, that's more important to, I think, the public at large, and not just the people who provide it in prime-time cable, than information.

At the 2006 White House Correspondents' Association Dinner, Colbert, the featured guest, described President Bush's thought processes using the definition of truthiness. Editor and Publisher used truthiness to describe Colbert's criticism of Bush, in an article published the same day titled "Colbert Lampoons Bush at White House Correspondents Dinner – President Not Amused?" E&P reported that the "blistering comedy 'tribute' to President Bush ... left George and Laura Bush unsmiling at its close" and that many people at the dinner "looked a little uncomfortable at times, perhaps feeling the material was a little too biting – or too much speaking 'truthiness' to power". E&P reported a few days later that its coverage of Colbert at the dinner drew "possibly its highest one-day traffic total ever", and published a letter to the editor asserting that "Colbert brought truth wrapped in truthiness". On the same weekend, The Washington Post and others also reported on the event. Six months later, in a column titled "Throw The Truthiness Bums Out", The New York Times columnist Frank Rich called Colbert's after-dinner speech a "cultural primary" and christened it the "defining moment" of the United States' 2006 midterm elections.

Colbert refreshed truthiness in an episode of The Late Show with Stephen Colbert on July 18, 2016, using the neologism Trumpiness regarding statements made by Donald Trump during his 2016 presidential campaign. According to Colbert, while truthiness refers to statements that feel true but are actually false, Trumpiness does not even have to feel true, much less be true. As evidence that Trump's remarks exhibit this quality, he cited a Washington Post column stating that many Trump supporters did not believe his "wildest promises" but supported him anyway.

== Coverage by news media ==
After Colbert's introduction of truthiness, it quickly became widely used and recognized. Six days after, CNN's Reliable Sources featured a discussion of The Colbert Report by host Howard Kurtz, who played a clip of Colbert's definition. On the same day, ABC's Nightline also reported on truthiness, prompting Colbert to respond by saying: "You know what was missing from that piece? Me. Stephen Colbert. But I'm not surprised. Nightline's on opposite me ..."

Within a few months of its introduction by Colbert, truthiness was discussed in The New York Times, The Washington Post, USA Weekly, the San Francisco Chronicle, the Chicago Tribune, Newsweek, CNN, MSNBC, Fox News, the Associated Press, Editor & Publisher, Salon, The Huffington Post, Chicago Reader, CNET, and on ABC's Nightline, CBS's 60 Minutes, and The Oprah Winfrey Show.

The February 13, 2006 issue of Newsweek featured an article on The Colbert Report titled "The Truthiness Teller", recounting the career of the word truthiness since its popularization by Colbert.

=== The New York Times coverage and usage ===
In its issue of October 25, 2005, eight days after the premiere episode of the Report, The New York Times ran its third article on The Colbert Report, "Bringing Out the Absurdity of the News". The article specifically discussed the segment on "truthiness", although the Times misreported the word as trustiness. In its November 1, 2005 issue, the Times ran a correction. On the next episode of the Report, Colbert took the Times to task for the error, pointing out, ironically, that trustiness is "not even a word".

The New York Times again discussed truthiness in its issue of December 25, 2005, this time as one of nine words that had captured the year's zeitgeist, in an article titled "2005: In a Word; Truthiness" by Jacques Steinberg. In crediting truthiness, Steinberg said, "the pundit who probably drew the most attention in 2005 was only playing one on TV: Stephen Colbert".

In the January 22, 2006 issue, columnist Frank Rich used the term seven times, with credit to Colbert, in a column titled "Truthiness 101: From Frey to Alito", to discuss Republican portrayals of several issues (including the Samuel Alito nomination, the Bush administration's response to Hurricane Katrina, and Jack Murtha's Vietnam War record). Rich emphasized the extent to which the word had quickly become a cultural fixture, writing, "The mock Comedy Central pundit Stephen Colbert's slinging of the word 'truthiness' caught on instantaneously last year precisely because we live in the age of truthiness." Editor & Publisher reported on Rich's use of "truthiness" in his column, saying he "tackled the growing trend to 'truthiness,' as opposed to truth, in the U.S."

The New York Times published two letters on the 2006 White House Correspondents' Dinner, where Stephen Colbert was the featured guest, in its May 3, 2006 edition, under the headline "Truthiness and Power".

Frank Rich referenced truthiness again in The New York Times in 2008, describing the strategy of John McCain's presidential campaign as being "to envelop the entire presidential race in a thick fog of truthiness", Rich explained that the campaign was based on truthiness because "McCain, Sarah Palin and their surrogates keep repeating the same lies over and over not just to smear their opponents and not just to mask their own record. Their larger aim is to construct a bogus alternative reality so relentless it can overwhelm any haphazard journalistic stabs at puncturing it." Rich also noted, "You know the press is impotent at unmasking this truthiness when the hardest-hitting interrogation McCain has yet faced on television came on 'The View'. Barbara Walters and Joy Behar called him on several falsehoods, including his endlessly repeated fantasy that Palin opposed earmarks for Alaska. Behar used the word 'lies' to his face."

== Recognition ==
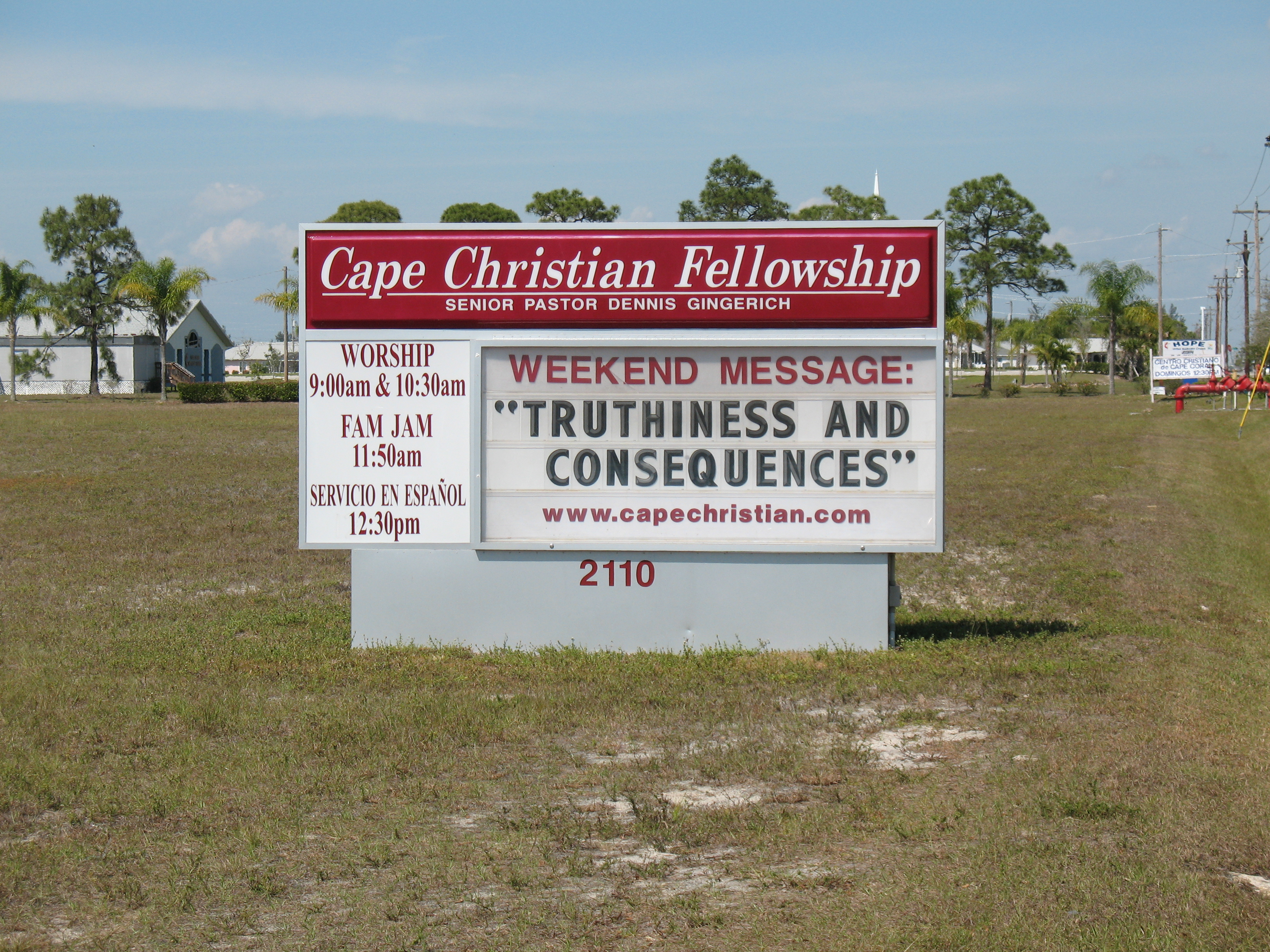
A church sign stating, "Truthiness and Consequences", taken March 10, 2007, in Cape Coral, Florida

Usage of truthiness continued to proliferate in media, politics, and public consciousness. On January 5, 2006, etymology professor Anatoly Liberman began an hour-long program on public radio by discussing truthiness and predicting it would be included in dictionaries in the next year or two. His prediction seemed to be on track when, the next day, the American Dialect Society announced that truthiness was its 2005 Word of the Year, and the website of the Macmillan English Dictionary featured truthiness as its Word of the Week a few weeks later. Truthiness was also selected by The New York Times as one of nine words that captured the spirit of 2005. Global Language Monitor, which tracks trends in languages, named truthiness the top television buzzword of 2006, and another term Colbert coined with reference to truthiness, wikiality, as another of the top ten television buzzwords of 2006, the first time two words from the same show have made the list.

The word was listed in the annual "Banished Word List" released by a committee at Lake Superior State University in Sault Ste. Marie, Michigan, in 2007. The list included truthiness among other overused terms, such as "awesome" celebrity couple portmanteaus such as Brangelina, and pwn. In response, on January 8, 2007, Colbert said Lake Superior State University was an "attention-seeking second-tier state university". The 2008 List of Banished Words restored truthiness to formal usage, in response to the 2007–2008 Writers Guild of America strike.

=== American Dialect Society's Word of the Year ===
On January 6, 2006, the American Dialect Society announced that truthiness was selected as its 2005 Word of the Year. The Society described its rationale as follows:

In its 16th annual words of the year vote, the American Dialect Society voted truthiness as the word of the year. First heard on The Colbert Report, a satirical mock news show on the Comedy Central television channel, truthiness refers to the quality of preferring concepts or facts one wishes or believes to be true, rather than concepts or facts known to be true. As Stephen Colbert put it, "I don't trust books. They're all fact, no heart."

=== Merriam-Webster's Word of the Year ===
On December 10, 2006, the Merriam-Webster Dictionary announced that truthiness was selected as its 2006 Word of the Year on Merriam-Webster's Words of the Year, based on a reader poll, by a 5–1 margin over the second-place word google. "We're at a point where what constitutes truth is a question on a lot of people's minds, and truth has become up for grabs", said Merriam-Webster president John Morse. "'Truthiness' is a playful way for us to think about a very important issue." However, despite winning Word of the Year, the word does not appear in the 2006 edition of the Merriam-Webster English Dictionary. In response to this omission, during "The Wørd" segment on December 12, 2006, Colbert issued a new page 1344 for the tenth edition of the Merriam Webster dictionary that featured truthiness. To make room for the definition of truthiness, including a portrait of Colbert, the definition for the word try was removed with Colbert stating "Sorry, try. Maybe you should have tried harder." He also sarcastically told viewers to "not" download the new page and "not" glue it in the new dictionary in libraries and schools.

=== The New York Times crossword puzzle ===
In the June 14, 2008 edition of The New York Times, the word was featured as 1-across in the crossword puzzle. Colbert mentioned this during the last segment on the June 18 episode of The Daily Show with Jon Stewart, and declared himself the "King of the Crossword".

=== BBC "portrait of the decade" ===
In December 2009, the BBC online magazine asked its readers to nominate suggestions of things to be included on a poster which would represent important events in the 2000s (decade), divided into five different categories: "People", "Words", "News", "Objects" and "Culture". Suggestions were sent in and a panel of five independent experts shortened each category to what they saw as the 20 most important. The selection in the "Words" category included Truthiness.

=== Research ===
There is a growing amount of research on how the truthiness of a claim is inflated by the accompanying nonprobative information. In particular, in 2012, a study examining truthiness was published by a group of students from three universities in the paper "Nonprobative photographs (or words) inflate truthiness". The experiments showed that people are more likely to believe a claim is true regardless of evidence when a decorative photograph or irrelevant verbosity appears alongside the claim.

Also in 2012, Harvard University's Berkman Center hosted a two-day symposium at Harvard and MIT, "Truthiness in Digital Media", exploring "concerns about misinformation and disinformation" in new media.

The Truthiness Collaborative is a project at USC's Annenberg School "to advance research and engagement around the misinformation, disinformation, propaganda and other challenges to discourse fueled by our evolving media and technology ecosystem".

== See also ==
- Alternative facts
- Bellyfeel
- Big lie – Propaganda technique
- Cognitive bias
- Cognitive dissonance
- Confabulation
- Disinformation
- Doublethink
- Factoid
- Fake news
- Fallacy
- De facto
- Illusory truth effect
- Mathiness
- Misinformation
- Newspeak
- Noble lie
- On Bullshit – an essay by Harry Frankfurt, originally written in 1986 but published as a book on January 10, 2005, nine months before Colbert coined truthiness
- Political correctness
- Processing fluency – a statement is more likely to be considered true if it is easier to process.
- Post-truth politics
- Sanewashing
- Selective exposure theory
- Solipsism
- Trumpism
- Truth sandwich
- Verisimilitude
- Wikiality – another word coined by Colbert
