= 2011 White House Correspondents' Dinner =

Satirical performances by Barack Obama and Seth Meyers

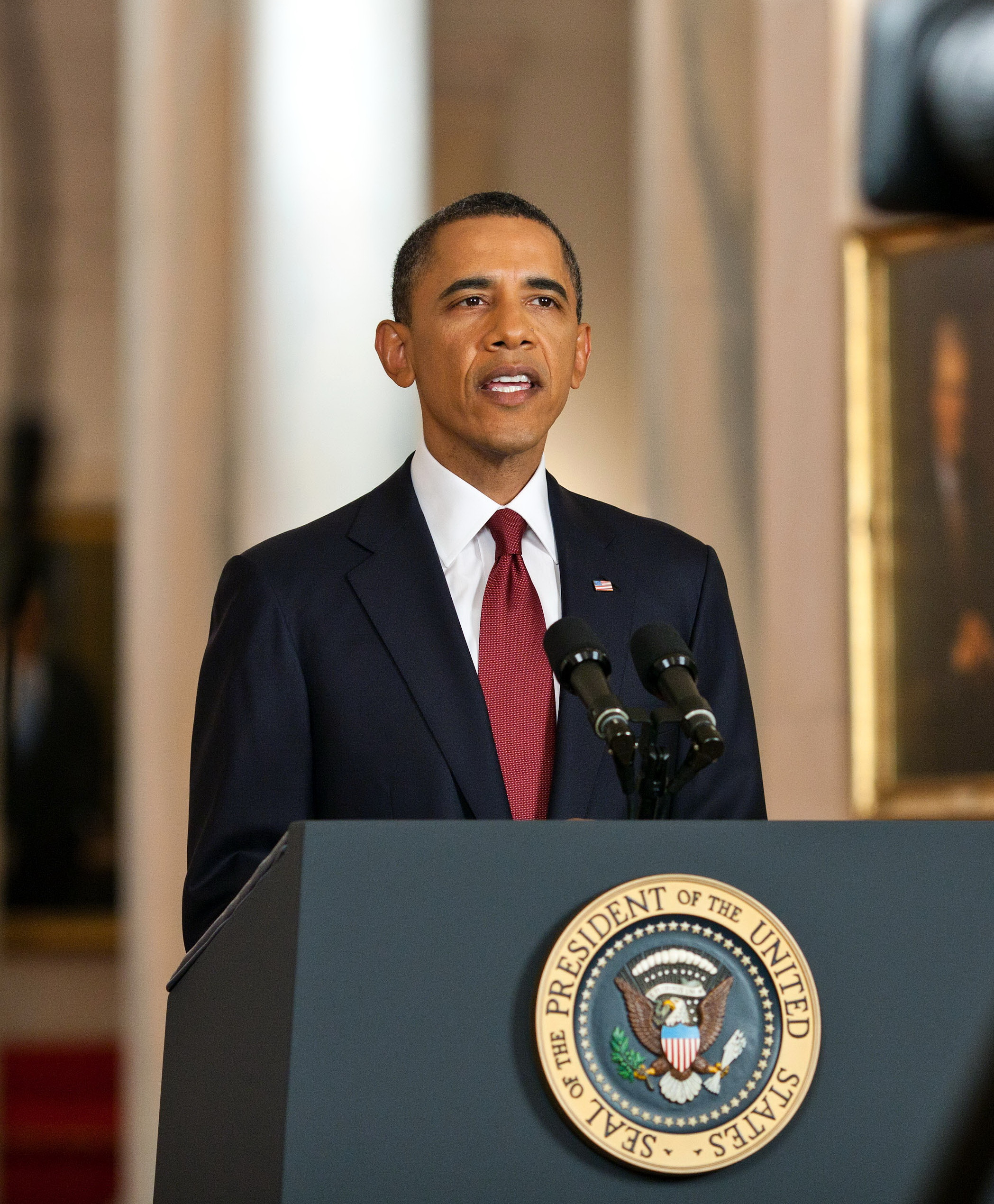
Barack Obama in 2011

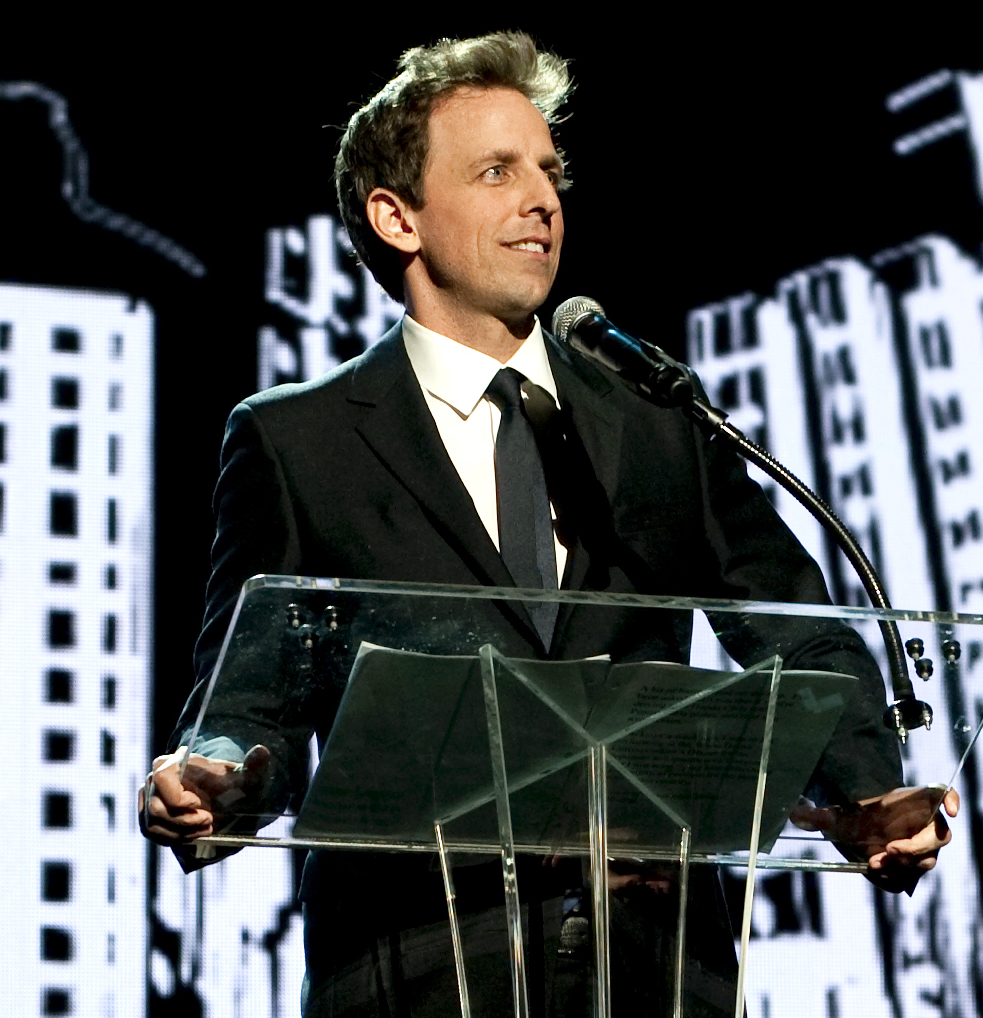
Seth Meyers in 2011

On April 30, 2011, American comedian Seth Meyers appeared as the featured entertainer at the 2011 White House Correspondents' Dinner, which was held at the Hilton Washington hotel in Washington, D.C. Taking place during the presidency of Barack Obama, both Obama and Meyers mocked businessman and television personality Donald Trump, who attended the dinner.

Trump would later successfully run for President in 2016 and 2024, although he has asserted that the dinner did not influence his decision to run for office.

== Background ==
American comedian Seth Meyers was the featured entertainer at the White House Correspondents' Dinner, held at the Hilton Washington hotel in Washington, D.C., on Saturday April 30, 2011. Since 1983, the event has featured well-known stand-up comics; previous performers include Jon Stewart and Craig Ferguson. Stephen Colbert's performance in 2006 was noted for its controversial jibes directed at president George W. Bush and the media. Meyers was a well-known political satirist as the anchor of the Saturday Night Live news segment Weekend Update.

The Celebrity Apprentice host Donald Trump was a prominent promoter of the Barack Obama citizenship conspiracy theories, known as the "birther movement". Having previously attended the 1993 dinner at the invitation of Vanity Fair's Graydon Carter, Trump was invited to the 2011 dinner as a guest of the Washington Post. A few days prior to the event, the state of Hawaii had released Obama's long-form birth certificate to quell the rumors.

According to former White House speechwriter Jon Favreau, Obama initially intended to ignore Trump at the dinner, but after the media's obsession over Trump, grew "grumpy — and eager for payback."

== Performances at the dinner ==
Obama's remarks on Trump

Preceding Meyers, Obama sarcastically mocked Trump, who had expressed interest in running for president, commenting in a "mock-serious" tone "we all know about your credentials and breadth of experience", which was met with laughter from the audience.

Obama also made light of the conspiracy theories:

...and I know just the guy to do it — Donald Trump is here tonight! Now, I know that he’s taken some flak lately, but no one is happier, no one is prouder to put this birth certificate matter to rest than the Donald. And that’s because he can finally get back to focusing on the issues that matter — like, did we fake the moon landing? What really happened in Roswell? And where are Biggie and Tupac?

Meyers also mocked Trump, saying:

Donald Trump has been saying he will run for president as a Republican, which is surprising since I just assumed he was running as a joke.

Both Obama and Secretary of Defense Robert Gates were seen laughing at Meyers' jokes about the government's apparent inability to track down Osama bin Laden, even though they were a day away from the operation to assassinate him.

As the dinner ended, Trump and his wife Melania reportedly "beelined for the exit".

== Reception ==
=== Donald Trump ===
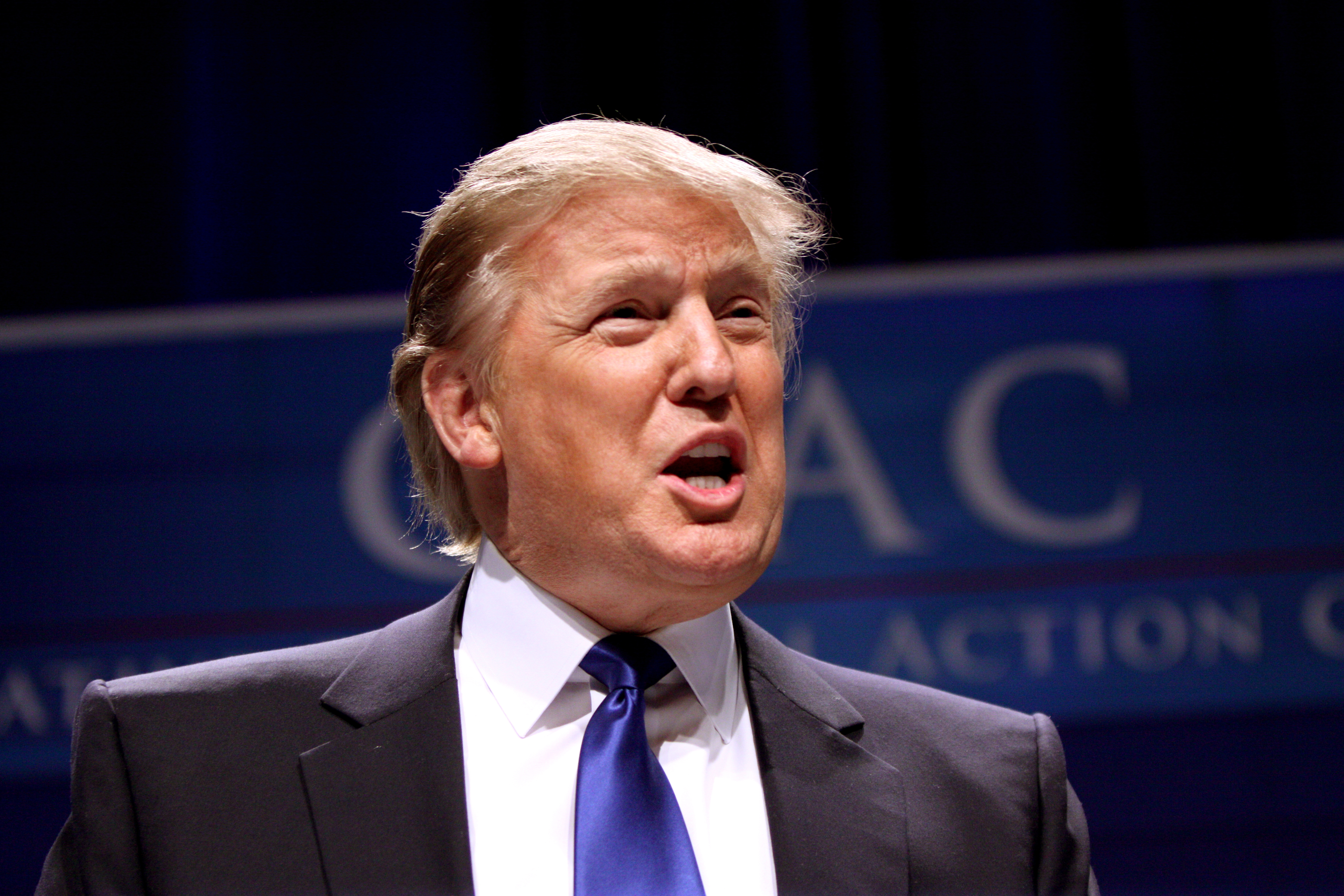
Donald Trump in 2011

[Trump's] head set in place, like a man in a pillory, he barely moved or altered his expression as wave after wave of laughter struck him. [...] No head bobbing or hand-clapping or chin-shaking or sheepish grinning—he sat perfectly still, chin tight, in locked, unmovable rage.

— Adam Gopnik, The New Yorker

During the dinner, Trump sat "motionless and expressionless, staring straight ahead". The following morning, in an interview with Michael Barbaro he commented, "Seth Meyers has no talent... He fell totally flat. In fact, I thought Seth’s delivery was so bad that he hurt himself."

Trump later said "I loved that evening. I had the greatest time" and that "There are many reasons I’m running, but that’s not one of them." Reflecting on the dinner in 2020, Trump was complimentary of Obama, saying "[Obama] treated me very nicely. You know, it was fun, but he treated me with respect." Trump continued "Seth Meyers, he was nasty. Just one joke. The guy’s got no talent whatsoever. Zero."

Political pundits later speculated that the dinner motivated Trump to run in the 2016 presidential election, but Trump denied the dinner had any influence on his campaign. During Trump's two terms as president, he did not attend another dinner until the 2026 event, where a shooting took place.

=== Seth Meyers ===
In an appearance on The Van Jones Show in June 2018, Meyers reflected on the event after Jones accused Meyers of "poking the bear". Meyers said "I think I did the right thing back then [...] Obama also told jokes about him that night and, looking back, I do think it was his fault." Speaking to Julia Ioffe in 2018, Meyers commented "I look back on that night, despite everything that’s happened, very fondly" and that "I certainly think [Trump] is driven by petty grievances."
