= Roast (comedy) =

Comedic genre

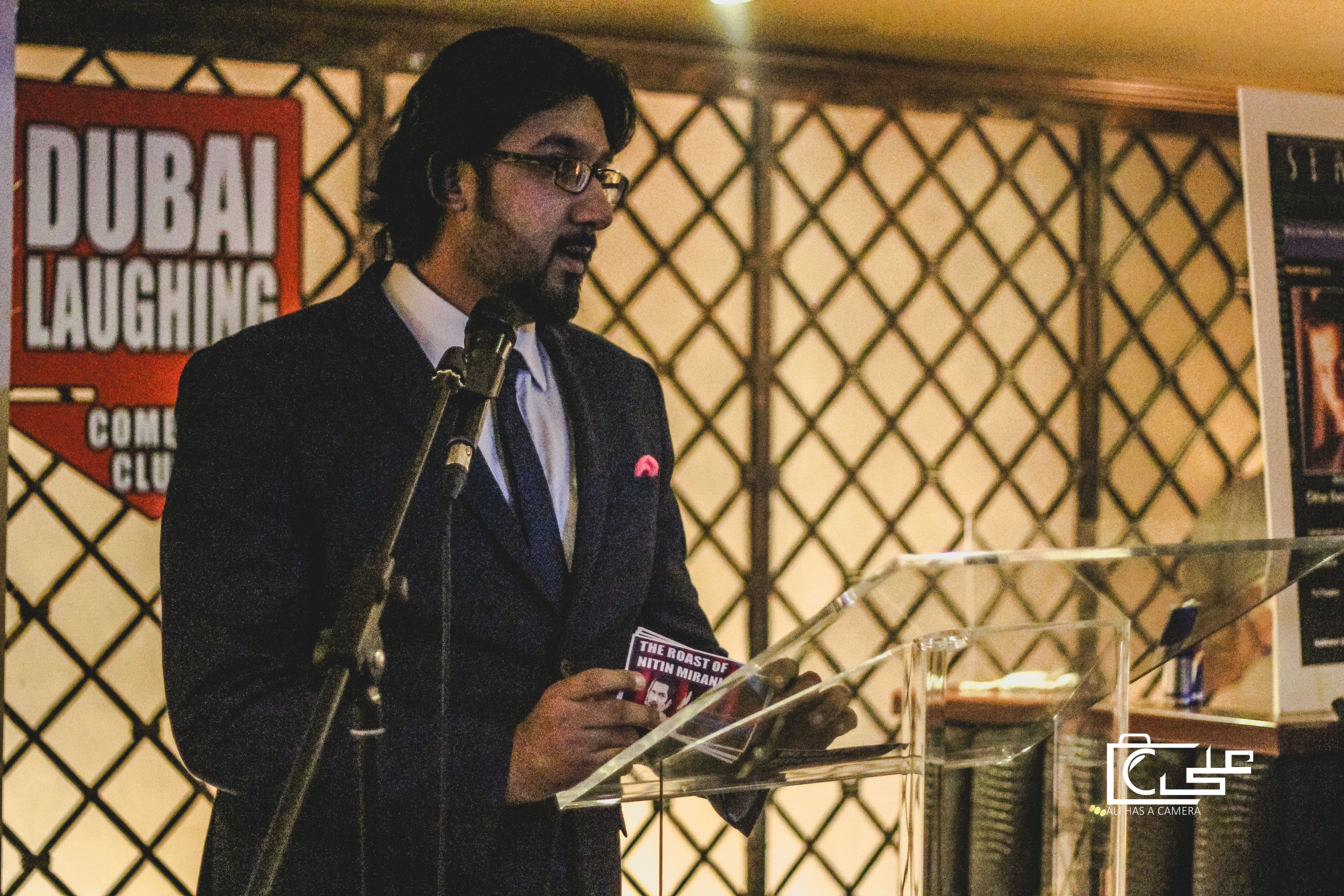
Comedian Osman Rohail performing a roast at a comedy club in Dubai

A roast is a form of insult comedy, originating in American humor, in which a specific individual, a guest of honor, is subjected to jokes at their expense, as well as genuine praise and tributes but the mean roasts mean no harm. The assumption is that the roastee can take the jokes in good humor and not as serious criticism or insult. The individual is surrounded by friends, fans, and well-wishers, who can receive some of the same treatment during the evening. The host of the event is called the roastmaster, since it rhymes with and plays on toastmaster. Anyone mocked in such a way is said to have been roasted.

There is a parallel tradition in some countries in which the host of formal events, such as award ceremonies and annual dinners, is expected to good-naturedly mock the event's attendees. In some cases, this has caused controversy when the host is seen as being too insulting.

There is also a concept of roasting on internet social media, where a person asks others to mock them, usually by putting up a photo of themselves. Though the mockery is solicited, this activity, too, has caused controversy, with some considering it a form of cyberbullying. Even more controversial is the practice of simply insulting others for comedic effect, which some have referred to as "roasting", though comedians have stressed that a true roast requires the consent of the target.

== History ==
The tradition has its roots in the raucous gatherings of the New York Friars Club in the early 20th century. These gatherings were private events where members could express themselves freely, often poking fun at each other. The formalization of roasting as a form of comedy stemming from the New York Friars Club brought many comedians and entertainers to the scene to take turns jabbing at a "guest of honor". The content of the roasts was presented to entertain, not to harm. This altogether kept the circumstances of performances comedic and uplifting, as opposed to attacking or hurtful.

The humor overall utilized throughout the development of the "roast" was defined as audacious and cheeky, filled with inflated or excessive remarks. This overall set up the basic roasting format that was used in the original context of the New York Friars Club.

In 1949, the New York Friars Club held its first roast, with French singer Maurice Chevalier as the guest of honor.

The format gained public popularity with The Dean Martin Celebrity Roast specials in the 1970s, televised events that brought the concept into American living rooms. Here, celebrities were humorously insulted, praised, and tributed by colleagues and comedians, establishing the roast as a form of high-profile entertainment that celebrated the careers and personalities of public figures.

Roasts have since evolved, with Comedy Central further popularizing the format in the 2000s with its series of celebrity roasts. These events maintained the tradition's spirit, combining affectionate tribute with biting humor, and often featured a dais of comedians and celebrities who took turns roasting the honoree and each other.

== Televised roasts in the United States ==
=== Kraft Music Hall ===
The final few seasons of the television show Kraft Music Hall, from 1968 to 1971, included broadcasts of the Friars Club Roast; the celebrities roasted included Johnny Carson, Milton Berle, Jack Benny, Don Rickles, and Jerry Lewis.

=== Dean Martin's Celebrity Roasts ===
Dean Martin hosted a series of roasts on television in 1974 as part of the final season of his self-titled variety show. After the show was cancelled, NBC decided to schedule a series of The Dean Martin Celebrity Roast specials from the former MGM Grand Hotel and Casino (now Horseshoe Las Vegas) in the Ziegfeld Room; these were recorded and aired approximately once every two months from late 1974 to early 1979, and another three were produced in 1984.

=== Comedy Central Roasts ===
From 1998 to 2002, the cable channel Comedy Central produced and broadcast the annual roast of the New York Friars Club, featuring celebrities such as Drew Carey, Jerry Stiller, Rob Reiner, Hugh Hefner, and Chevy Chase.

Based on the success of these roasts, Comedy Central began hosting their own roasts on a roughly annual basis, under the name Comedy Central Roast. The first roastee was Denis Leary in 2003, followed by Jeff Foxworthy, Pamela Anderson, William Shatner, Flavor Flav, Bob Saget, Larry the Cable Guy, Joan Rivers, David Hasselhoff, Donald Trump, Charlie Sheen, Roseanne Barr, James Franco, Justin Bieber, Rob Lowe, Bruce Willis, and Alec Baldwin.

Comedian Jeff Ross gained fame through his participation in the televised Comedy Central roasts, and is frequently referred to as the "Roastmaster General", a position he in fact held with the New York Friars Club.

In 2010, Comedy Central's international affiliates began to produce and air their own local roasts as well. Comedy Central New Zealand has aired roasts of Mike King and Murray Mexted; Comedy Central Africa has aired roasts of Steve Hofmeyr, Kenny Kunene, Somizi Mhlongo, AKA, and Khanyi Mbau; Comedy Central Latin America has aired a roast of Héctor Suárez; Comedy Central Spain has aired roasts of Santiago Segura, El Gran Wyoming, and José Mota; and Comedy Central Netherlands has aired roasts of Gordon (which was the highest-watched broadcast in the history of the channel), Giel Beelen, Johnny de Mol, Ali B, and Hans Klok.

== Other televised roasts in the United States ==
The fourth (and final) episode of The Richard Pryor Show in 1977 was a roast of host Richard Pryor.

Playboy produced one roast in 1986 of Tommy Chong that aired on the Playboy Channel.

Basketball player Shaquille O'Neal produced two editions of his Shaq's All Star Comedy Roast: of himself in 2002 and of Emmitt Smith in 2003.

In 2003, the cable channel MTV produced a roast of Carson Daly, which was billed as the MTV Bash.

The cable channel TBS produced a roast in 2008 of Cheech & Chong, which was billed as Cheech & Chong: Roasted.

The cable channel A&E also produced a roast in 2008, which was of Gene Simmons.

The magazine Guitar World organized three "Rock & Roll Roasts" from 2012 to 2014. They were of musicians Zakk Wylde, Dee Snider, and Corey Taylor.

A Friars Club roast of Terry Bradshaw was aired on ESPN2 in 2015.

The cable channel Fusion aired a roast of Snoop Dogg in 2016, billed as the Snoop Dogg Smokeout.

RuPaul's Drag Race has aired five roast-themed episodes: roasts of RuPaul in both season 5 (2013) and in RuPaul's Secret Celebrity Drag Race (2020), a roast of Michelle Visage in season 9 (2017), a mock-funeral roast of Lady Bunny in RuPaul's Drag Race All Stars season 4 (2019), and a Nice Girls Roast in season 13.

The cable channel TNT aired a roast of the anchors of the TNT show Inside the NBA in 2020.

In 2024, Netflix released a roast of Tom Brady.

== Outside the United States ==
=== United Kingdom ===
Some attempts have been made to adapt the American roast format to a British audience. Channel 4 launched the latest British version on April 7, 2010, with A Comedy Roast, with initial victims being Bruce Forsyth, Sharon Osbourne, and Chris Tarrant. Davina McCall and Barbara Windsor were other victims.

The television series Roast Battle ran for four series from 2018 to 2020 on the British channel Comedy Central. It was an adaptation of the American series Jeff Ross Presents Roast Battle.

=== Canada ===
- Roast Battle Canada

=== Australia ===
- The Roast of John Cleese 2023 Melbourne Seven Network
- Roast Battle Australia
- Comedy Roast: Battle Royale!, Perth

=== India ===
The Indian comedy group All India Bakchod organized the live show AIB Knockout in January 2015 featuring Arjun Kapoor and Ranveer Singh with Karan Johar as the roastmaster. The programme caused a controversy for allegedly featuring distasteful, sexist, offending, and humiliating content. Videos of the event were removed from YouTube. Comedy Nights Bachao by Optimystix Productions.

=== China ===
Artists and producers working for Shanghai Xiao Guo Culture Co. Ltd., started importing foreign stand-up comedy formats since 2012. Roast!, a Chinese version of Comedy Central Roasts, has reached 2.33 billion hits on Tencent's video streaming platform, according to Maoyan, a movie and TV site. Roast! differs in that, instead of a single annual special, it consists of annual seasons of 10 shows with a different celebrity victim – typically singers or actors – each week (season one contains 11 including a triple-length Chinese New Year special). A spin-off web show, Rock & Roast, has also become a hit in China, with 70 million viewers in its 2019 season, a steady increase from 50 million in its prior season.

=== Italy ===
- RIP: Roast in Peace

== Fictional roasts ==
Roasts have sometimes been portrayed in fictional TV shows. In other cases, standalone roasts have been produced of historical characters, with both roastees and roasters played by actors.

The Dean Martin Celebrity Roast aired one fictional roast, of George Washington (played by Jan Leighton), on March 15, 1974.

Part 2 of the 1979 TV special Legends of the Superheroes was a roast of various DC Comics superhero characters, hosted by Ed McMahon.

The 1997 episode "The Roast" of the series The Larry Sanders Show revolved around a roast of the title character (Garry Shandling). The main plot of the 2013 episode "Correspondents' Lunch" of the NBC sitcom Parks and Recreation involves protagonist Leslie Knope (Amy Poehler) roasting the media of the fictional town of Pawnee in a local correspondents' lunch. In the 2009 episode "Stress Relief" of The Office, main character Michael Scott (Steve Carell) organizes a roast of himself.

The 2019 Netflix series Historical Roasts, hosted by Jeff Ross, featured roasts of historical figures Abraham Lincoln (played by Bob Saget), Freddie Mercury (James Adomian), Anne Frank (Rachel Feinstein), Martin Luther King Jr. (Jerry Minor), Cleopatra (Ayden Mayeri), and Muhammad Ali (Jaleel White).

== In United States politics ==
During presidential election years in the U.S., it is customary for both major party candidates to attend the Alfred E. Smith Memorial Foundation Dinner, typically engaging in a roast of each other, and occasionally themselves.

The White House Correspondents' Association and Radio and Television Correspondents' Association have annual dinners that, in some years, feature a comedy roasting of the U.S. President. Don Imus at the RTCA in 1996, Stephen Colbert in 2006, and Michelle Wolf in 2018 have received particular attention for their biting remarks during their speeches.

"I don't know. You don’t know. But a handful of armchair psychoanalysts — reporters for major news organizations, no less — have decided that it all began at the 2011 White House Correspondents' Association dinner, where Trump was the butt of jokes by President Obama and Saturday Night Live comedian Seth Meyers." —Roxanne Roberts
