= White House Correspondents' Dinner =

Annual event

The White House Correspondents' Dinner is an annual dinner organized by the White House Correspondents' Association (WHCA). It began in 1921, and is traditionally attended by the president and vice president. Every president has attended at least one WHCA dinner, beginning with Calvin Coolidge in 1924. The dinner is traditionally held on the evening of the last Saturday in April at the Washington Hilton.

Prior to World War II, the annual dinner featured singing between courses, a homemade movie, and an hour-long, post-dinner show with big-name performers. Since 1983, the featured speaker has usually been a comedian, with the dinner taking on the form of a comedy roast of the president and his administration.

The dinner also funds scholarships for gifted students in college journalism programs.

Many annual dinners have been canceled or downsized due to deaths or political crises. The dinner was canceled in 1930 due to the death of former president William Howard Taft; in 1942, following the United States' entry into World War II; and in 1951, over what President Harry S. Truman called the "uncertainty of the world situation". In 1981, Ronald Reagan did not attend because he was recuperating after the attempted assassination the previous month, but he did phone in to tell a joke about the shooting. President Donald Trump did not attend during his first term, and the 2026 dinner during his second term was interrupted after shots were fired outside the ballroom. The event was subsequently postponed to July 24, where Trump did attend.

== History ==
Until 1962, the dinner was open only to men, even though WHCA's membership included women. At the urging of Helen Thomas, President John F. Kennedy refused to attend the dinner unless the ban on women was dropped.

The 2006 dinner featured a pointed performance by Stephen Colbert, during which several of President George W. Bush's aides walked out.

During his first presidency, Donald Trump did not attend the dinners in 2017, 2018, and 2019, though he had attended as a private citizen in 2011 and 2015. Trump indicated that he might attend in 2019 since this dinner did not feature a comedian as the featured speaker. However, on April 5, 2019, he announced that he again would not attend, calling the dinner "so boring, and so negative," instead hosting a political rally that evening in Wisconsin. On April 22, Trump ordered a boycott of the dinner, with White House Cabinet Secretary Bill McGinley assembling the agencies' chiefs of staff to issue a directive that members of the administration not attend. However, some members of the administration attended pre- and post-dinner parties.

In 2017 Samantha Bee hosted a rival event to raise money for the Committee to Protect Journalists, Not the White House Correspondents' Dinner.

After the April 30, 2022, dinner, several attendees, including Secretary of State Antony Blinken, tested positive for COVID-19. However, no cases of serious illness were reported as a result of the dinner.

At the 2024 White House Correspondents' Dinner, pro-Palestinian protesters shouted "Shame on you!" at arriving attendees.

Trump also declined to attend the dinner in 2025, the first year of his second presidency. Some members of his administration were also absent from the dinner and instead attended the launch party for Executive Branch, a new private club in Georgetown that is owned by Donald Trump Jr. and others with ties to the administration.

Trump attended the dinner in 2026 before evacuating after gunshots were heard. After officers secured the Washington Hilton hotel building, the guests at the dinner departed the hotel. The first lady, Melania Trump, was also in attendance and evacuated promptly alongside her husband. An alleged shooter was arrested.

== Dinner criticisms ==
The WHCD has been criticized as an example of the close relationship between the White House press corps and the administration. The dinner has typically included a skit, either live or videotaped, by the sitting US president in which he mocks himself, for the amusement of the press corps. The press corps, in turn, hobnobs with administration officials, even those who are unpopular and are not regularly cooperative with the press. Increasing scrutiny by bloggers has contributed to added public focus on this friendliness.

After the 2007 dinner, New York Times columnist Frank Rich implied that the Times would no longer participate in the dinners. Rich wrote that the dinner had become "a crystallization of the press's failures in the post-9/11 era" because it "illustrates how easily a propaganda-driven White House can enlist the Washington news media in its shows".

Other criticism has focused on the amount of money actually raised for scholarships, which has decreased over the past few years.

The dinners have drawn increasing public attention, and the guest list grows "more Hollywood". The attention given to the guest list and entertainers often overshadows the intended purpose of the dinner, which is to "acknowledge award-winners, present scholarships, and give the press and the president an evening of friendly appreciation". This has led to an atmosphere of coming to the event only to "see and be seen". This usually takes place at pre-dinner receptions and post-dinner parties hosted by various media organizations, which are often a bigger draw and can be more exclusive than the dinners themselves.

The public airings of the controversies around the dinner from the mid-2000s onward gradually focused concern about the nature of the event. While interest in the event from entertainers, journalists, and political figures was high during the Obama administration, by the period of the Trump administration, interest gradually slowed in attending, especially after President Trump announced he would not attend, nor his staff. Business related to the weekend event slowed considerably, including at hotels, high-end restaurants, salons, caterers, and limo companies. During the Trump administration, some media companies stopped hosting parties, while other of the roughly 25 events held during the three-day period gained more prominence as signs of social status. By 2019, the dinner and associated parties had returned somewhat to their previous nature as networking and media functions, with packed houses of media industry employees and Washington political figures.

== List of dinners ==
Date	Performer(s)	Notes
May 7, 1921		
May 3, 1924		President Calvin Coolidge became the first president to attend the dinner.
1930	—N/a	The dinner was canceled due to the death of former president William Howard Taft on March 8.
March 15, 1941		
1942	—N/a	Dinner canceled following the United States' entry into World War II.
February 12, 1943		
March 4, 1944	Bob Hope, Fritz Kreisler, Gracie Fields, Pedro Vargas, Fred Waring, Elsie Janis, Ed Gardner, Nan Merriman, Robert Merrill, and Frank Black	
March 1945	Frank Sinatra, Danny Thomas, Jimmy Durante, Fanny Brice, Danny Kaye, and Garry Moore	
March 23, 1946	Ed Sullivan (host); featured performers included Herb Shriner, Señor Wences, Paul Draper, Larry Adler, and Sugar Chile Robinson.	
March 6, 1948	Spike Jones	
March 14, 1949		
1951	—N/a	Dinner canceled due to what President Harry S. Truman referred to as the "uncertainty of the world situation".
May 1953	Bob Hope	
c. February 27, 1954	Milton Berle, The Four Step Brothers, Jaye P. Morgan, The McGuire Sisters, and Irving Berlin performed.	Held at the Statler Hotel. Berlin performed an original song, "I Still Like Ike," to honor President Dwight D. Eisenhower.
March 1955	Duke Ellington, Tennessee Ernie Ford, Channing Pollock	
May 1956	James Cagney emceed; Nat King Cole, Patti Page, and Dizzy Gillespie performed.	
October 12, 1959		
February 25, 1961	The Peiro Brothers (jugglers), Julie London, Dorothy Provine, Mischa Elman, and Jerome Hines	
April 27, 1962	Peter Sellers, Gwen Verdon, Richard Goodman, and Benny Goodman shared hosting duties.	Event opened to female correspondents for the first time.
May 24, 1963	Merv Griffin emceed; Barbra Streisand performed.	
May 21, 1964	Duke Ellington, the Smothers Brothers	
May 11, 1968	Richard Pryor	
May 3, 1969	The Disneyland Golden Horseshoe Revue	
May 2, 1970	George Carlin	
May 8, 1971		President Richard Nixon was in attendance; he later described the dinner as "probably the worst of this type that I have attended", and called the attendees "a drunken group; crude, and terribly cruel".
1972		President Nixon declined to attend and sent his wife, Pat Nixon, in his place.
April 14, 1973		Held in the International Ballroom of the Washington Hilton Hotel
May 4, 1974		President Nixon again declined to attend; Vice President Gerald Ford attended in his place.
May 3, 1975	Danny Thomas and Marlo Thomas	
May 1, 1976	Bob Hope emceed and Chevy Chase performed.	When President Gerald Ford rose to speak, he pretended to fumble, and began his speech with "Good evening. I'm Gerald Ford and you're not"—a reference to Chase's catchphrase from Saturday Night Live's Weekend Update.
April 30, 1977		
April 29, 1978		President Jimmy Carter declined to attend, sending press secretary Jody Powell in his place.
April 28, 1979		
May 3, 1980	Preservation Hall Jazz Band	
April 25, 1981		President Ronald Reagan did not attend because he was recuperating after the attempted assassination the previous month.
April 24, 1982		
April 23, 1983	Mark Russell	Russell's stand-up bits replaced the traditional cabaret
April 13, 1984	Rich Little (Note: At the start of his 2007 dinner speech, Little stated that he had previously hosted in 1984, but "had to wait until everybody died" before he was invited back.)	
April 27, 1985	Mort Sahl	
April 17, 1986	Dick Cavett	
April 22, 1987	Jay Leno	
April 21, 1988	Yakov Smirnoff	
April 29, 1989	Jim Morris (Bush impersonator)	Garry Shandling made a surprise appearance.
April 28, 1990	Jim Morris	
April 27, 1991	Sinbad	
May 8, 1992	Paula Poundstone	Poundstone was the first solo female host.
May 1, 1993	Elayne Boosler	This was the first year that the dinner was televised on C-SPAN.
April 23, 1994	Al Franken	
April 29, 1995	Conan O'Brien	
May 4, 1996	Al Franken	
April 26, 1997	Jon Stewart	
April 25, 1998	Ray Romano	
May 1, 1999	Aretha Franklin	A non-comedian was chosen to host because of the recent impeachment of President Bill Clinton. NBC's Brian Williams performed a skit.
April 29, 2000	Jay Leno	President Clinton mocked himself in the short film President Clinton: The Final Days, which depicted him as a lonely man closing down a nearly deserted White House, riding a bicycle, and learning about the Internet with the help of actor Mike Maronna.
April 28, 2001	Darrell Hammond	
May 4, 2002	Drew Carey	
April 26, 2003	Ray Charles	President George W. Bush decided to eschew a comedian that year, given the recent invasion of Iraq.
May 1, 2004	Jay Leno	
April 30, 2005	Cedric the Entertainer	First Lady Laura Bush performed some jokes.
April 29, 2006	Stephen Colbert	See also: Stephen Colbert at the 2006 White House Correspondents' Dinner Colbert performed while being in character of his television satire of a right-wing cable television pundit. Colbert also screened a video featuring Helen Thomas. Several of President Bush's aides and supporters walked out during Colbert's speech, and one former aide said that Bush had "that look that he's ready to blow". Steve Bridges also performed a Bush impersonation.
April 21, 2007	Rich Little	David Letterman appeared by video with a Top 10 list of "favorite George W. Bush moments".
April 26, 2008	Craig Ferguson	Like his Late Late Show monologues, Ferguson appeared to go off script and started improvising new jokes. It was noted that President Bush had difficulty understanding Ferguson's Scottish accent.
May 9, 2009	Wanda Sykes	
May 1, 2010	Jay Leno	Leno hosted for the fourth time, more than any other individual in the dinner's history. Leno had been chosen several weeks before his controversial Tonight Show conflict, and his use of recycled jokes was noted by critics.
April 30, 2011	Seth Meyers	See also: 2011 White House Correspondents' Dinner Both President Barack Obama and Secretary of Defense Robert Gates were seen laughing at Meyers' jokes about the government's apparent inability to track down Osama bin Laden, even though they were a day away from the operation to assassinate him. President Obama and Meyers also mocked then-Celebrity Apprentice host Donald Trump's role as the face of the birther movement. Trump, who was present at the dinner, would go on to be elected president five years later in 2016. Journalists present at the dinner said being mocked by President Obama and Meyers made him decide to run for president, but Trump would later deny this, saying that he had been considering a run for the presidency for many years prior to the dinner.
April 28, 2012	Jimmy Kimmel	
April 27, 2013	Conan O'Brien	
May 3, 2014	Joel McHale	Prior to President Obama's remarks, a video with Vice President Joe Biden and Julia Louis-Dreyfus, who played Vice President Selina Meyer on the HBO show Veep, was shown.
April 25, 2015	Cecily Strong	Keegan-Michael Key made a guest appearance as President Obama's "anger translator", Luther, a recurring character from the Comedy Central show Key & Peele.
April 30, 2016	Larry Wilmore	Wilmore delivered a controversial, searing routine targeting the president, elite media, lobbyists, politicians, and celebrities. At the end of the speech, Wilmore ended his set by thanking President Obama for having been the country's first black president and finished his speech by calling him "my nigga" on live television. This remark sparked controversy among the media, with some calling it disrespectful.
April 29, 2017	Hasan Minhaj	President Donald Trump did not attend the dinner. The last time a sitting president did not attend in person was Ronald Reagan in 1981, who was recovering from an assassination attempt. The Washington Post journalists Bob Woodward and Carl Bernstein presented awards and spoke about the importance of the First Amendment.
April 28, 2018	Michelle Wolf	President Trump did not attend the dinner for the second consecutive year. Instead, he sent his press secretary, Sarah Huckabee Sanders. Wolf received both praise and criticism for her monologue. The association released a rare statement regarding the monologue. Several attendees walked out in reaction to Wolf's "brutal" comments. After the dinner, newspaper The Hill informed the WHCA that it would no longer participate in the event, saying, "In short, there's simply no reason for us to participate in something that casts our profession in a poor light. Major changes are needed to the annual event."
April 27, 2019	Ron Chernow	President Trump did not attend the dinner for the third consecutive year. Additionally, Trump ordered some of his staff and administration members to boycott the dinner. The WHCA chose historian Ron Chernow as the featured speaker instead of a comedian after Wolf's controversial set.
2020	—N/a	The dinner was originally scheduled for April 25, 2020, with comedian Kenan Thompson hosting and political entertainer and former WHCD host Hasan Minhaj as the featured entertainment. On March 22, the dinner was postponed due to the COVID-19 pandemic, without naming a substitute date. On April 13, a new date of August 29 was announced. On June 23, WHCA President Jonathan Karl announced that the dinner itself would be canceled, but that the WHCA was working on a virtual presentation format to honor award winners and scholarship recipients. On August 14, Hasan Minhaj spoke privately via Zoom with the WHCA 2020 scholarship recipients, who also attended a private online panel discussion by three veteran Washington political reporters that day.
2021	—N/a	On April 14, 2021, WHCA executive director Steven Thomma announced that improvements in the pandemic situation had not been sufficient to allow the association to proceed with a large indoor event, and that no dinner would be held in 2021. However, the association still intended to select recipients for its annual journalism awards and student scholarships, and announced that it planned to go ahead with the dinner the following year, on April 30, 2022.
April 30, 2022	Trevor Noah	The dinner was held in person for the first time since the COVID-19 pandemic. President Joe Biden attended the dinner, making him the first president to attend the dinner since 2016 as Trump boycotted the event throughout his first presidency.
April 29, 2023	Roy Wood Jr.	
April 27, 2024	Colin Jost	
April 26, 2025	—N/a	In February 2025, the WHCA board announced that comedian Amber Ruffin would be the featured entertainment for the dinner. On March 29, WHCA president Eugene Daniels announced that the board had decided to cancel her performance, "to ensure the focus is not on the politics of division". Ruffin's planned appearance had been criticized by White House deputy chief of staff Taylor Budowich, who labeled the WHCA's cancellation of Ruffin's performance as a "cop-out" and described her as "hate-filled". Commenting on her cancellation, Ruffin said, "I thought when people take away your rights, erase your history and deport your friends, you’re supposed to call it out. But I was wrong." President Trump did not attend the dinner.
April 25, 2026 July 24, 2026	Oz Pearlman	President Trump attended the dinner for the first time as president. He skipped the dinners during his first presidency, as well as the first one in his second presidency. However, shots were fired during the event and he was forced to evacuate alongside other White House and Cabinet officials as well as the First Lady, Melania Trump. Attendees hid under the tables whilst the ballroom doors were closed. Weijia Jiang, president of the association, stated that "we will reschedule this event in 30 days and that [Trump] wanted to continue, despite the news, but has to follow security protocol." The dinner was rescheduled after the shooting that disrupted the original event on April 25. The WHCA announced that the dinner would be held at the Waldorf Astoria with enhanced security measures and new access procedures.
April 24, 2027	TBA	The dinner will return to the Washington Hilton in 2027. President Trump stated he plans to attend the dinner.

== Gallery ==
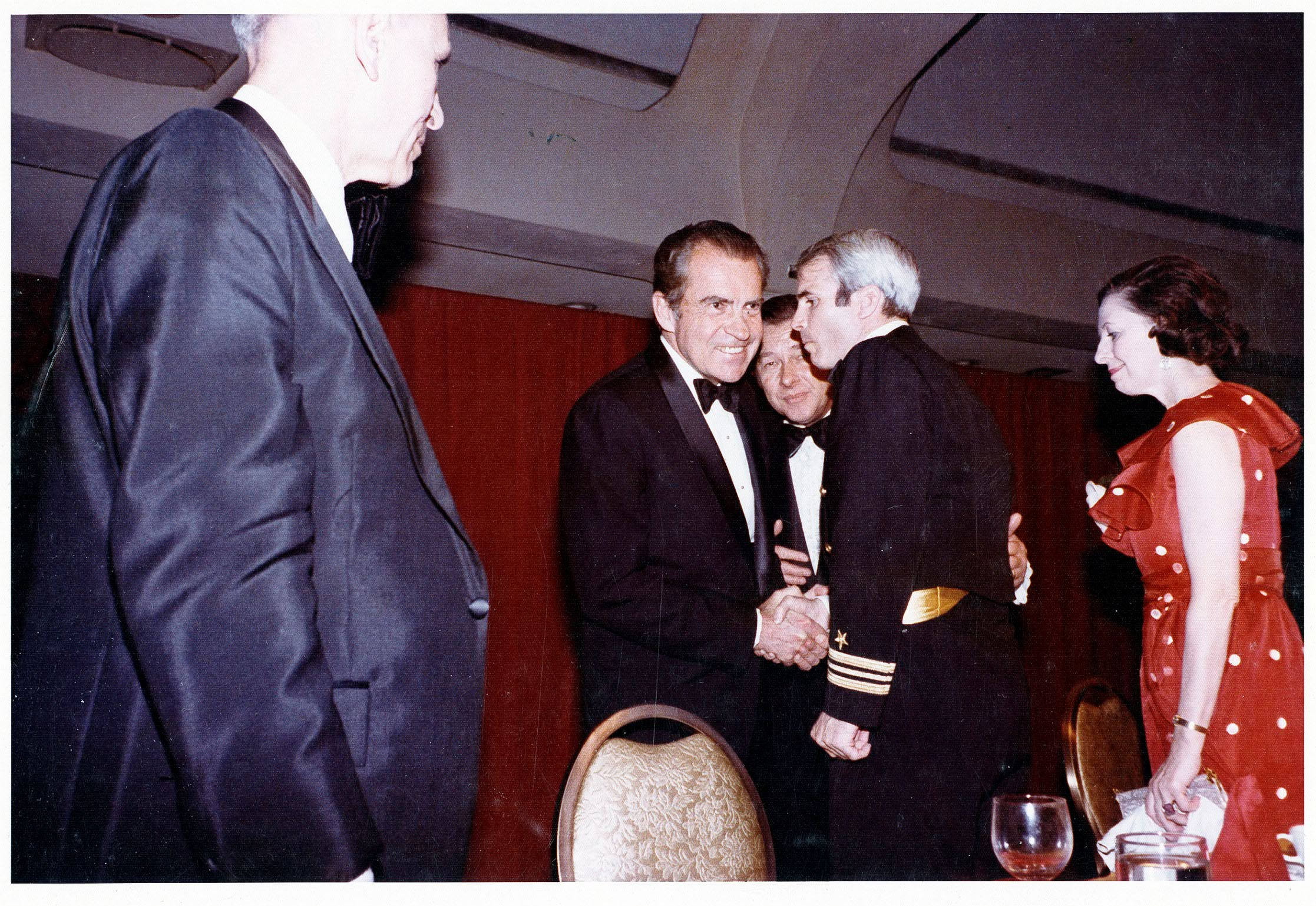
President Richard Nixon and U.S. Navy Lieutenant Commander John McCain at the 1973 White House Correspondents Dinner

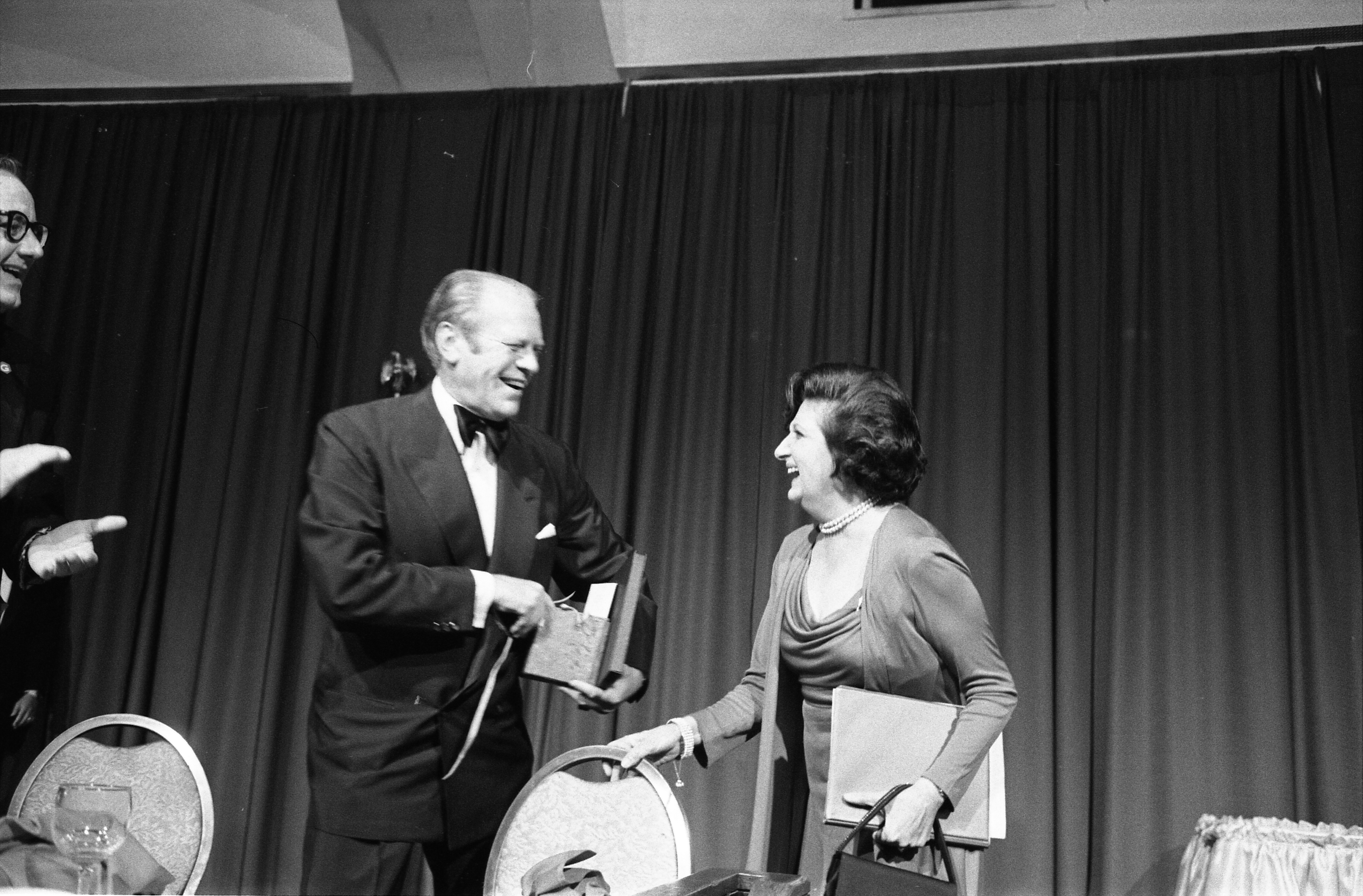
President Gerald Ford (left) with White House Correspondent Helen Thomas at the 1975 Dinner

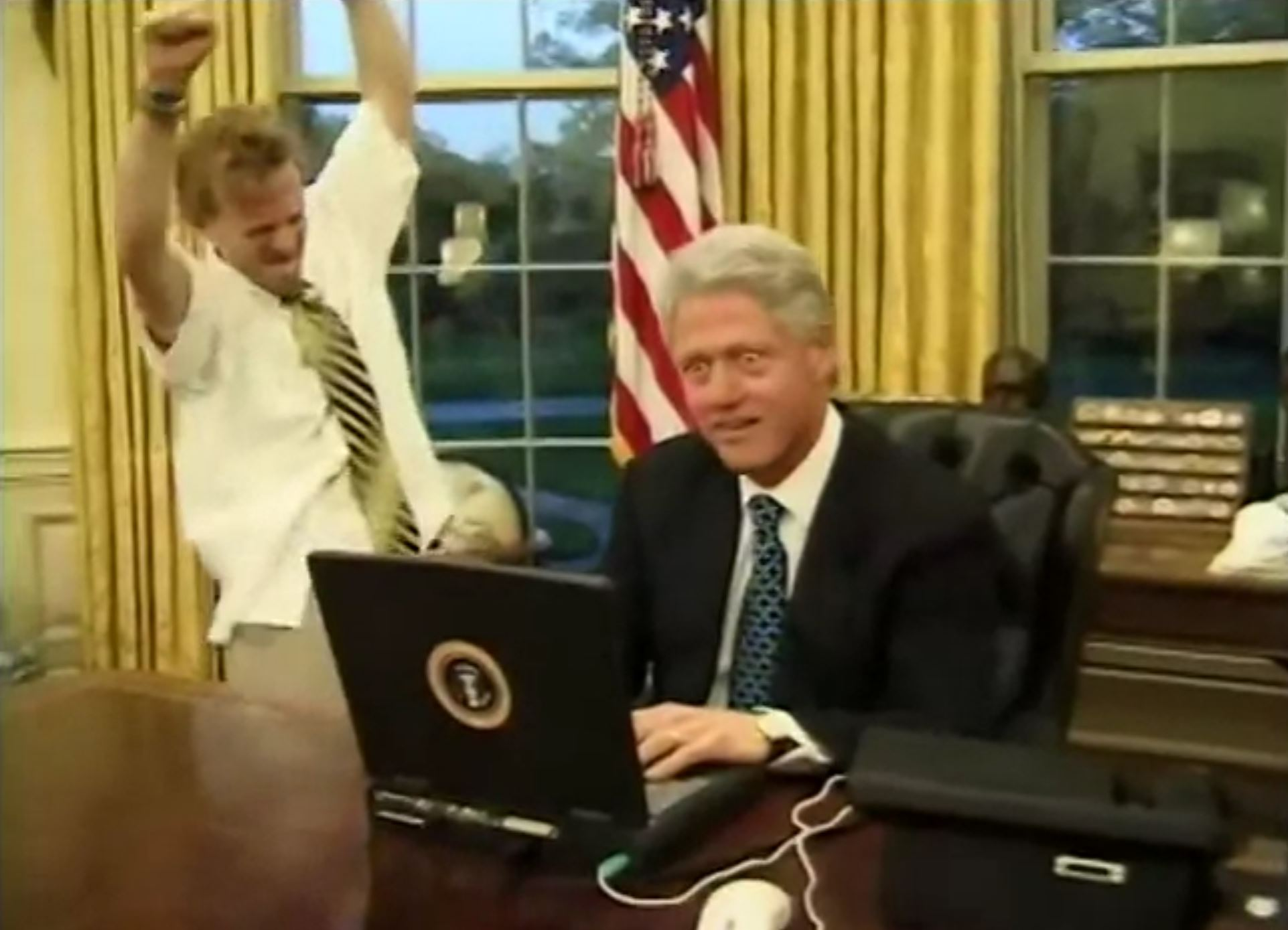
President Bill Clinton (right) with television actor Mike Maronna (left) celebrating a successful online purchase in a comedic short film recorded for the 2000 Dinner

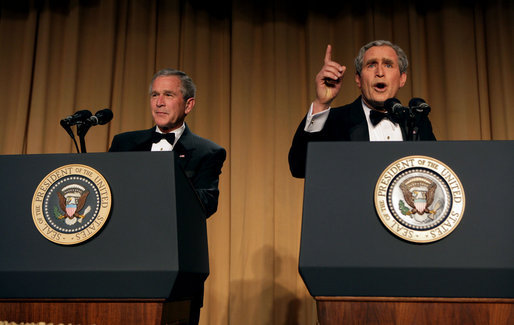
President George W. Bush (left) with Bush impersonator Steve Bridges in character (right) at the 2006 Dinner

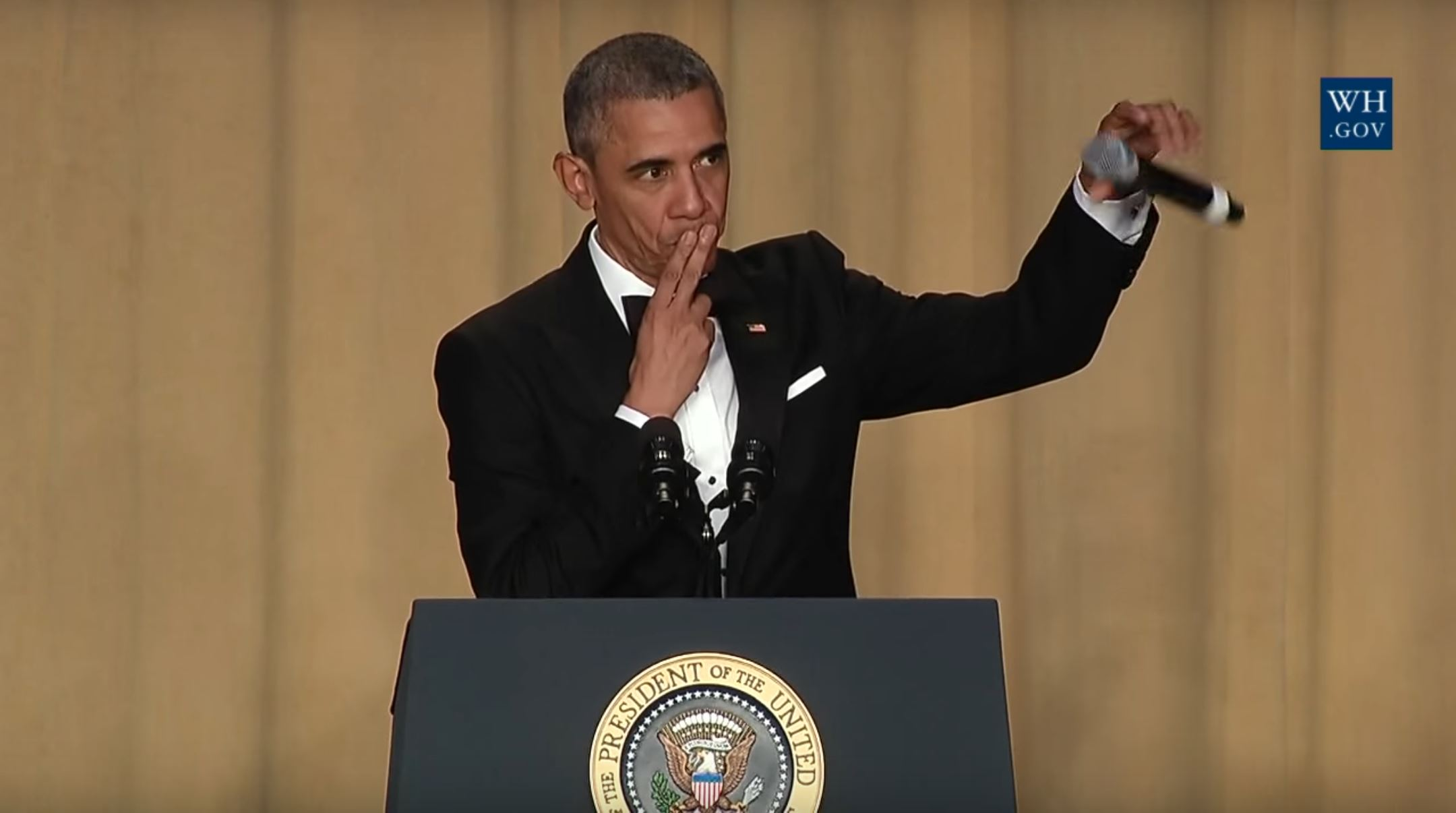
President Barack Obama ending his final Correspondents' Dinner speech with a mic drop at the 2016 Dinner

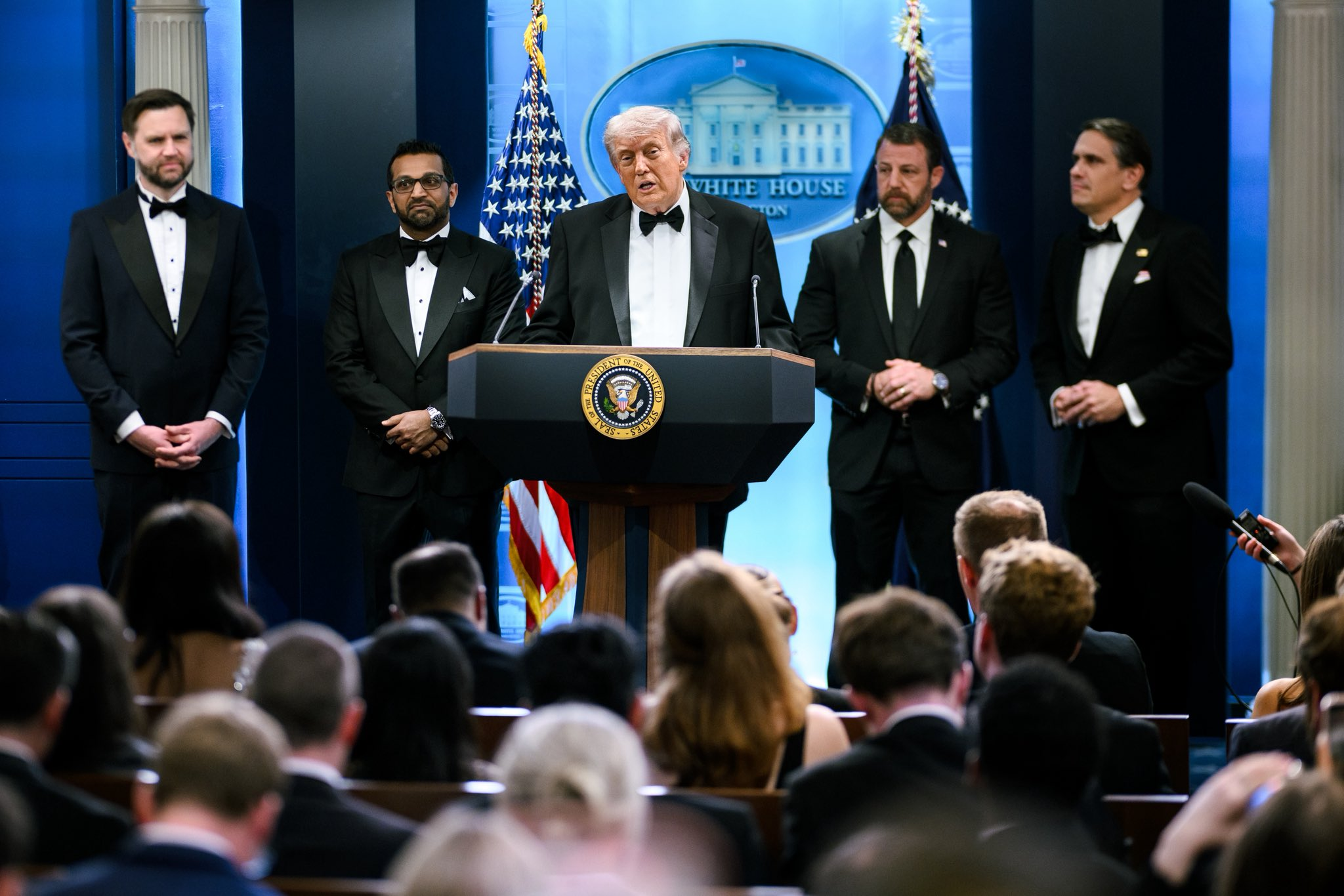
President Trump and members of the administration comment on the 2026 security incident immediately after the dinner was called off

== See also ==
- Alfred E. Smith Memorial Foundation Dinner
- Canadian Parliamentary Press Gallery Dinner
- List of dining events
