= 2026 White House Correspondents' Dinner shooting =

Shooting in Washington, D.C.

- Part of security incidents involving Donald Trump
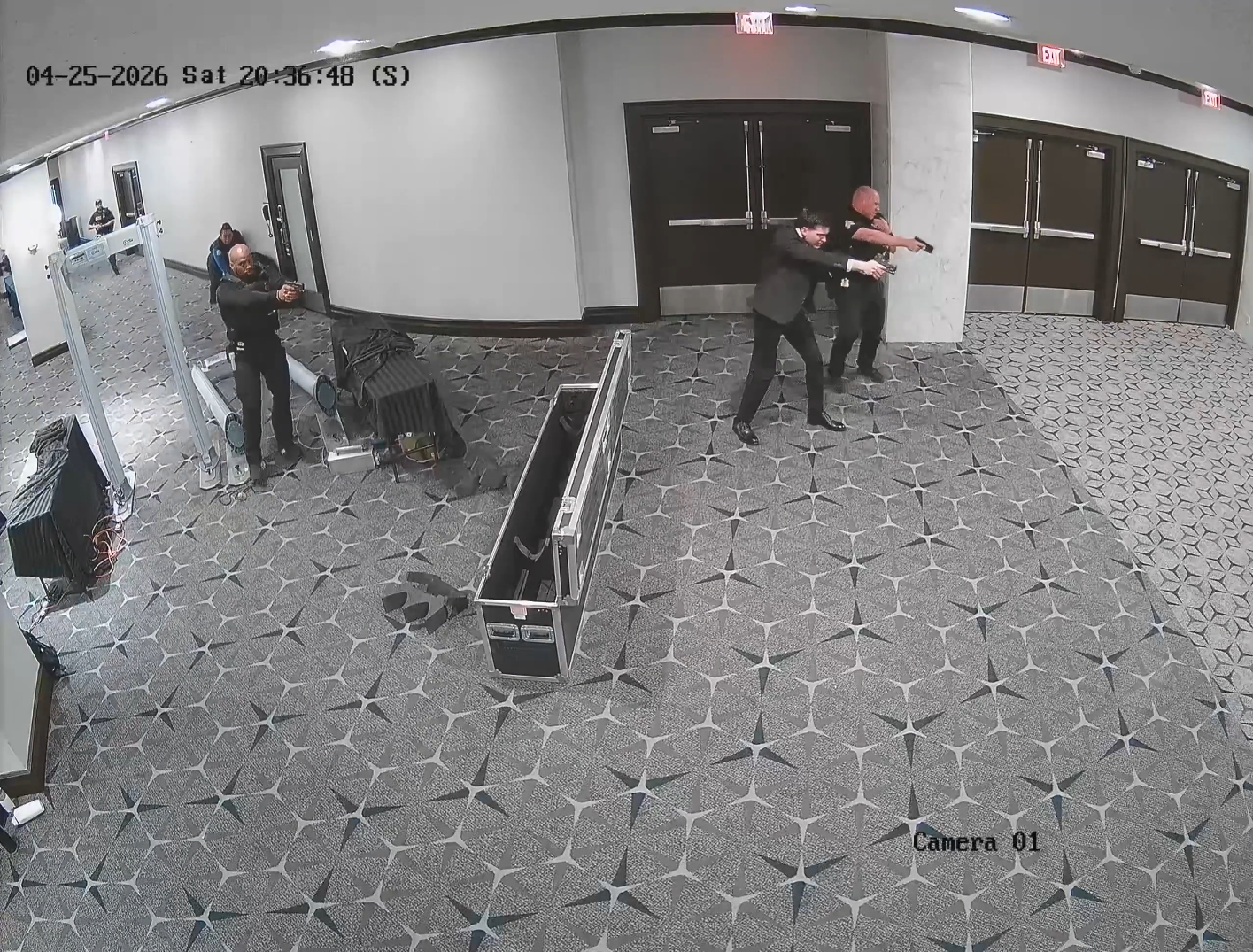
- Law enforcement at the dinner's security screening area, responding to the armed suspect at 8:36 p.m.
- Location: 38°54′59″N 77°02′43″W; Washington Hilton; Washington, D.C., US
- Date: April 25, 2026; 8:36 p.m. (EDT; UTC−04:00)
- Target: Trump administration officials
- Attack type: Political violence; shooting
- Weapons: 12-gauge Maverick shotgun; Armscor Precision .38 semi-automatic pistol (unused); Ka-Bar knife (unused); Three Smith & Wesson boot knives (unused)
- Deaths: 0
- Injuries: 2 (including the suspect) (Note: 1 from gunfire, suspect sustained non-gunshot injuries)
- Motive: Under investigation
- Accused: Cole Tomas Allen
- Charges: 5 counts (Note: Attempting to assassinate the president of the United States; Assaulting an officer or employee of the United States with a deadly weapon; Using a firearm during a crime of violence; Transportation of firearm in interstate commerce with intent to commit a felony; Committing an act of terrorism while armed)

On the evening of April 25, 2026, gunshots were fired near the main security screening area for the annual White House Correspondents' Dinner at the Washington Hilton in Washington, D.C. Shortly afterwards, President Donald Trump, First Lady Melania Trump, Vice President JD Vance, and members of Trump's Cabinet were evacuated from the event by Secret Service officials. This was the first White House Correspondents' Dinner that Trump has attended as president.

Law enforcement officials identified the suspect as 31-year-old Cole Tomas Allen, who allegedly intended to target multiple Trump administration officials. Allen was arrested near the screening area outside the banquet hall, after running past the security checkpoint while armed. Investigators believe he was staying at the hotel as a guest. One officer was struck in his bullet-resistant vest and admitted to a hospital, then later released. The suspect was taken to the hospital for a single knee injury despite not being hit by gunfire.

A manifesto that officials attributed to Allen criticized Trump administration policies, referred to himself as the "Friendly Federal Assassin", and stated that he intended to target administration officials. The manifesto did not name Trump, but stated "I am no longer willing to permit a pedophile, rapist, and traitor to coat my hands with his crimes". Allen was charged with five criminal counts, including attempting to assassinate a US president, carrying a possible sentence of life in prison if convicted. He pleaded not guilty to all of the charges on May 11, and his trial is set to begin in September 2027. The dinner was rescheduled for July 24, at the Waldorf Astoria hotel in D.C.

The incident was the third apparent attempt on Trump's life since 2024, following the July 2024 attempt near Butler, Pennsylvania, and the September 2024 attempt at Trump's golf club in West Palm Beach, Florida. The Washington Hilton was also the site of the attempted assassination of Ronald Reagan in 1981.

== Background ==
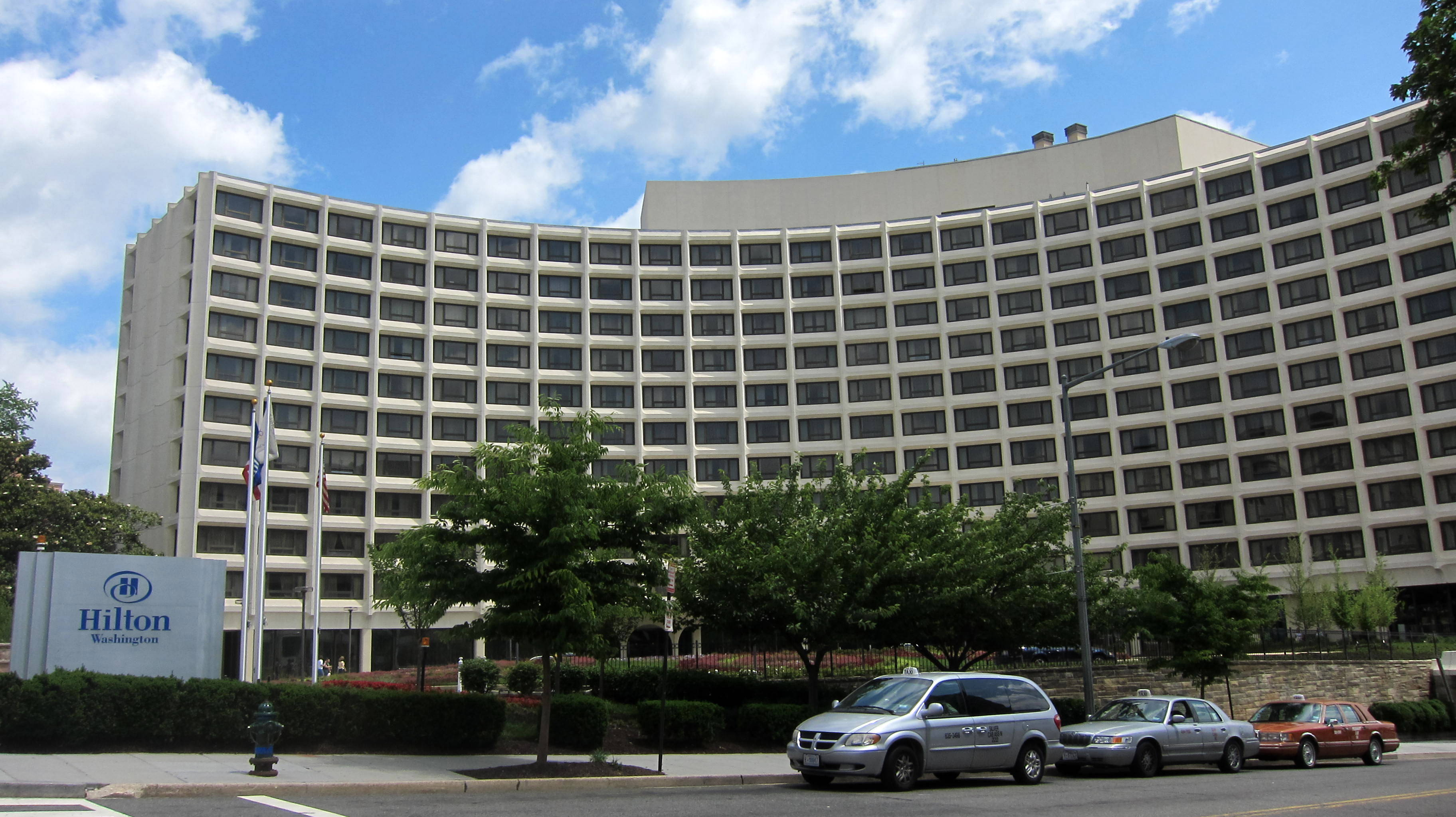
The White House Correspondents' Dinner was held at the Washington Hilton hotel, seen here in 2010.

The White House Correspondents' Association (WHCA) holds an annual dinner in Washington, D.C., traditionally attended by the sitting president, members of the press, and other dignitaries. The 2026 dinner, held at the Washington Hilton, was the first such event attended by Trump during his presidencies; he had declined to attend during his first term and in 2025. The 2026 dinner featured mentalist Oz Pearlman as the celebrity performer.

The event attracted approximately 2,600 attendees, including senior administration officials such as Vice President Vance, Secretary of State Marco Rubio, Secretary of Defense Pete Hegseth, Federal Bureau of Investigation (FBI) director Kash Patel, Health and Human Services Secretary Robert F. Kennedy Jr. and Environmental Protection Agency (EPA) administrator Lee Zeldin.

Former FBI deputy director Andrew McCabe said that security at the event was "almost on the level of a national security event", given the concentration of senior government officials in one location. He said that a likely massive coordination between the Secret Service and partner agencies had been organized in advance. However, the highest security level was not invoked for the event. The Associated Press noted that the lobby of the Washington Hilton regularly remains open to other guests during the dinner, and that security and screening is typically located closer to the ballroom itself.

The Associated Press noted Trump's contentious relationship with journalists; before the dinner, five hundred journalists had signed a petition urging the WHCA to oppose Trump's "efforts to trample freedom of the press". For her part, WHCA president Weijia Jiang said, "I don't think people realize how closely we are working with the White House". Among the protesters outside the event, one held a sign saying, "Journalism is dead." In 1981, John Hinckley Jr. attempted to assassinate Ronald Reagan at the entrance to the same hotel.

White House press secretary Karoline Leavitt said that a discussion about the line of succession took place before the dinner but that there were several members of the Cabinet not in attendance, so no specific designated survivor was needed.

== Incident ==
=== Shooting ===
CCTV footage of the suspect running past the screening area near the ballroom

At about 8:00 p.m. EDT, the suspect took a photo of himself standing in front of the mirror in his hotel room that he had reportedly had booked at the venue, dressed in black with a red neck tie. He reportedly also wore a small leather bag, a shoulder holster, a sheathed knife, pliers and wire cutters, before taking an unguarded back stairwell down from his room, which was 10 floors above the ballroom. At 8:30 p.m., the suspect sent his manifesto, a text file titled "Apology and Explanation", to family members via email. At least two of the family members, upon reading the manifesto, immediately called the police.

At 8:36 p.m., while dinner was being served inside the main ballroom, the suspect ran past a security checkpoint and authorities believe he fired at least one shot at a Secret Service agent. Investigators alleged that the suspect was running at at least nine miles per hour before he was apprehended, after he tripped and fell to the ground after hitting his knee on a magnetometer box. Several US Secret Service agents yelled "shots fired" inside the venue, according to pool reports.

CNN anchor Wolf Blitzer, who was outside the main ballroom at the time, reported being only a few feet away from the gunman when the shots were fired. Blitzer described the shooter as firing what appeared to be "a very serious weapon" at least six times before being tackled and taken to the ground by police. Blitzer was ushered to safety in a nearby restroom by officers. It was later stated by investigators that the suspect had fired one shot with his shotgun and five rounds were fired by the Secret Service officer who had been struck in his bulletproof vest.

The Secret Service stopped the suspect from entering the ballroom and he was taken into custody at the scene, after being stripped of his shirt to determine if the suspect had any explosives on him. One law enforcement officer was struck in his bullet-resistant vest and was admitted to a hospital but was later released. The New York Times reported evidence suggesting that the suspect did not fire that round. Prosecutors later disputed this, stating that the suspect shot the officer. The gunman sustained a single knee injury from the tackle, for which he was taken to a nearby hospital for treatment.

=== Evacuation ===
Trump, who had been seated at the head table on the stage as Oz Pearlman performed for him, his wife, and Karoline Leavitt, was surrounded by Secret Service agents about ten seconds after the shots were fired. Once armed guards in tactical gear with rifles appeared on the dais and some other attendees, including Vance, had been evacuated, Trump was escorted off the stage, briefly falling in the process. Many of the roughly 2,600 attendees took cover under their tables.

White House Deputy Chief of Staff Dan Scavino unsuccessfully attempted to start a "U-S-A!" chant as Trump was escorted out and others began filming inside the ballroom. First Lady Melania Trump, Vice President Vance, White House press secretary Leavitt, and other cabinet members were also evacuated from the ballroom and moved to secure holding areas within the hotel. Several members of Congress were seen departing the event on foot, including Senator Sheldon Whitehouse (D-RI) and Representative Jared Moskowitz (D-FL).

Trump remained inside the hotel in a secure area while officials assessed the situation. He departed the Washington Hilton for the White House at approximately 9:45 p.m. EDT after law enforcement requested that all attendees leave the venue. Among the attendees, Charlie Kirk's widow, Erika, was escorted away in tears.

== Accused ==
A suspect was arrested near the screening area outside of the banquet hall. The United States Secret Service confirmed the incident in a statement, saying it was investigating a shooting incident near the main magnetometer screening area in coordination with the Metropolitan Police Department. The suspect was carrying a Maverick 12-gauge shotgun, an Armscor Precision .38 semiautomatic pistol, a Ka-Bar knife and three Smith & Wesson boot knives. Interim Washington, D.C., police chief Jeffery Carroll said the suspect was taken to the hospital for a single knee injury despite not being hit by gunfire and that investigators believe he was staying at the hotel as a guest.

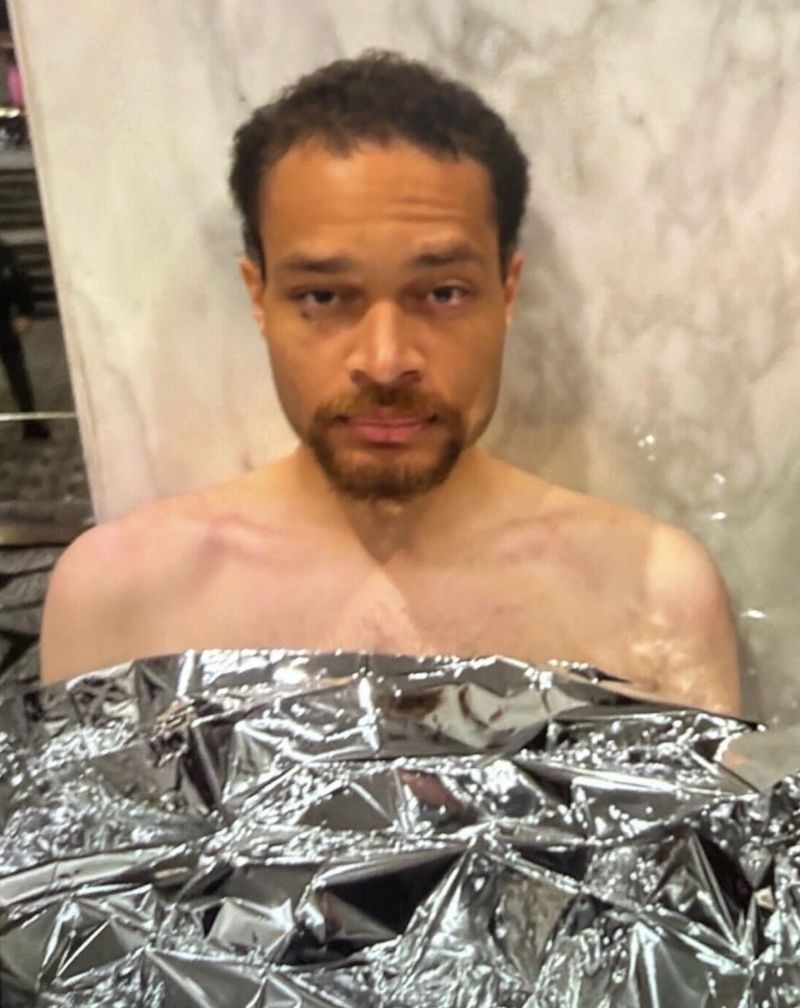
Photograph of Cole Tomas Allen taken by law enforcement shortly after the incident

Before the FBI had named the suspect, two law enforcement officials spoke to news agencies, and named him as Cole Tomas Allen (born April 11, 1995), an academic tutor, video game developer, and mechanical engineer from Torrance, California (a suburb of Los Angeles). Trump posted images on Truth Social of Allen after his arrest, lying face down on the ground shirtless, with his hands cuffed behind his back, and surrounded by Secret Service agents.

Allen was homeschooled throughout high school, however he played volleyball at Pacific Lutheran High School via a special program his junior year. He graduated from the California Institute of Technology in 2017 with a bachelor’s degree in mechanical engineering. He obtained a Master of Science degree in computer science from California State University, Dominguez Hills in May 2025. According to law enforcement, Allen worked for C2 Education, a tutoring firm in Torrance and received a "Teacher of the Month" award from the company in December 2024. Wired reported that Allen has been employed part-time at C2 Education since March 2020. According to Federal Election Commission records, Allen donated $25 to a Democratic Party PAC, ActBlue, for Kamala Harris's presidential campaign in October 2024. Allen had lived in the Greater Los Angeles area since 2010. Prior to the shooting, Allen lived with his parents, along with his two sisters and one brother.

Family members were interviewed by investigators and Secret Service agents said that Allen "made radical statements and that he constantly referenced a plan to do 'something' to fix the issues with today's world", that he was part of a Connecticut-based group called "The Wide Awakes" based in Hartford, attended No Kings protests in California, and would regularly go to a shooting range to train with firearms. Allen's sister told Secret Service agents and the Montgomery County Police Department that Allen had purchased two handguns and a shotgun, which he stored at their parents' home without their knowledge.

In New London, Connecticut, Allen's brother notified the police department about the alleged manifesto that he sent to his family members. New London police chief Brian Wright released a statement the following afternoon, confirming that the "individual wanted to share information they believed to be pertinent to the matter". The official characterized the writing as displaying anti-Trump sentiment and describes his targets as administration officials, and not guests or hotel employees. According to the official, Allen apologized to family and friends in his writing, and said that he does not expect forgiveness. New London police immediately turned their case over to federal law enforcement afterward.

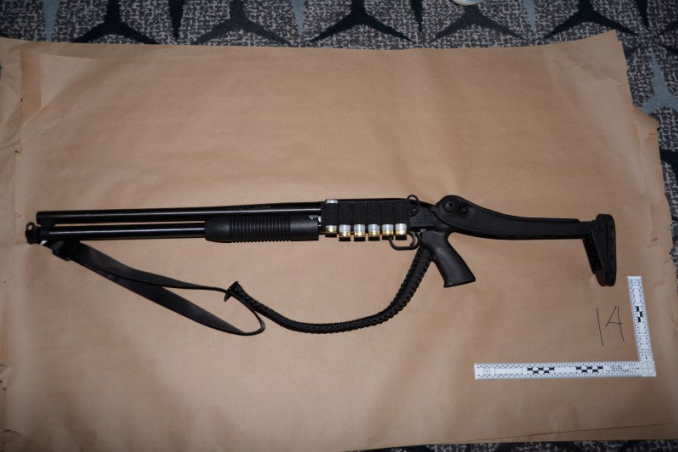
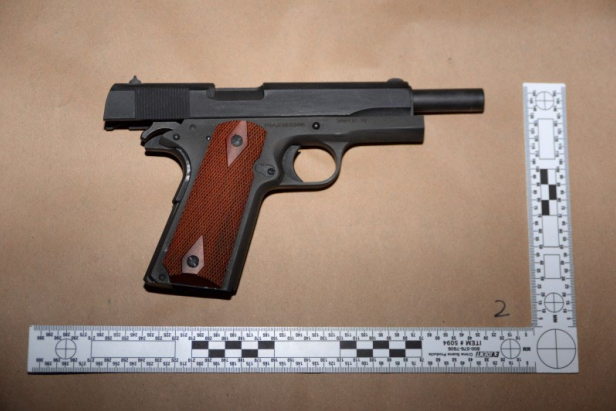
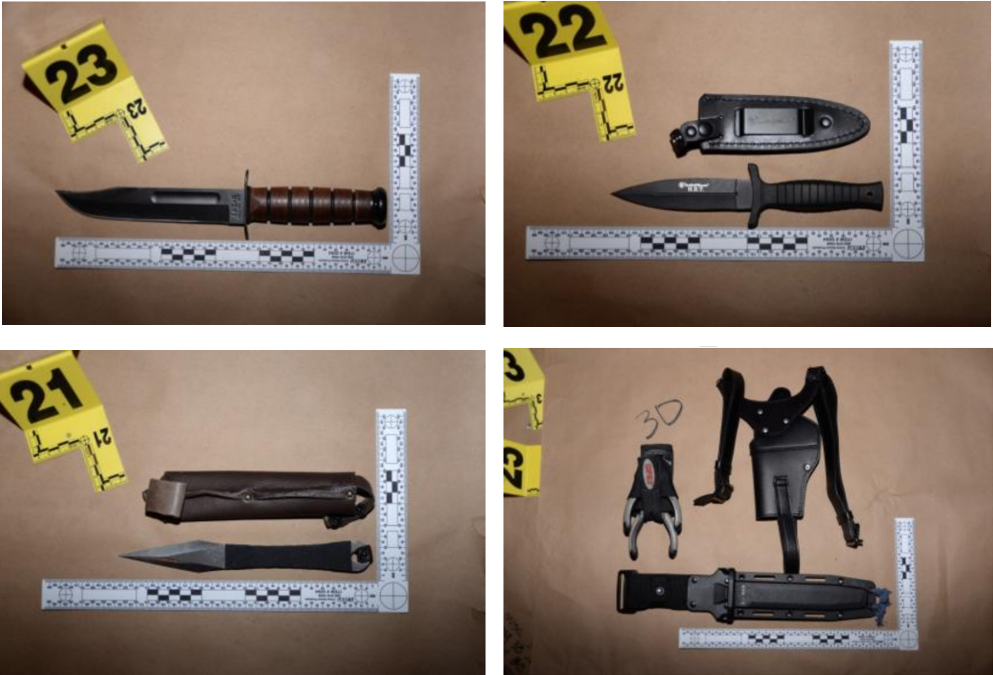
The 12-gauge Maverick shotgun, Armscor Precision .38 semi-automatic pistol, and the multiple knives Allen allegedly had on him for the shooting

After the incident, FBI agents and the Torrance Police Department swarmed through Allen's house, using tactical gear and armored vehicles. Acting US attorney general Todd Blanche said that Allen boarded Amtrak on April 21 and took two of their routes, the Southwest Chief from Los Angeles to Chicago and the Floridian from Chicago to D.C., before checking in as a guest at the hotel on April 24.

A manifesto, purported to be the suspect's, read in part:

I am a citizen of the United States of America. What my representatives do reflects on me. And I am no longer willing to permit a pedophile, rapist, and traitor to coat my hands with his crimes... Turning the other cheek when *someone else* is oppressed is not Christian behavior; it is complicity in the oppressor's crimes.

The manifesto does not name Trump, but lists among its grievances the federal government's strikes on what it claimed were drug boats in the Pacific early in 2026. It expressed the author's astonishment regarding the seeming lack of security at the hotel: "What the hell is the Secret Service doing?… No damn security. Not in transport. Not in the hotel. Not in the event." CBS News noted that because the Washington Hilton was a "functioning hotel with numerous public spaces during the dinner", only the areas where the dinner took place were secured by the Secret Service.

== Legal proceedings ==
Acting US attorney general Todd Blanche, DC attorney general Jeanine Pirro, and FBI director Kash Patel announce that they are charging Allen with attempting to assassinate Trump on April 27.

On April 27, the US Department of Justice held a news conference to announce that Allen was being charged with the attempted assassination of Trump, transportation of a firearm and ammunition through interstate commerce with intent to commit a felony, and discharge of a firearm during a crime of violence. He faces life in prison if convicted. In a court filing April 29, the Department of Justice provided new information and photos, including a list of his possessions at the time of his arrest and items recovered from his parents' home in Los Angeles.

Allen briefly appeared in federal court on April 27 for an initial hearing, flanked by US Marshals. Appearing before federal judge Zia Faruqui on May 4, Allen alleged he had been put in five-point restraints, which prompted Faruqui to remark that Allen was being treated worse than the January 6 partisans. On May 5, Allen was indicted on four charges, which included attempting to assassinate the president. On May 11, he appeared before federal judge Trevor McFadden in Washington, D.C. and pleaded not guilty to all of the charges. The next court hearing occurred on June 29, where Department of Justice attorneys and Allen's defense team discussed a potential plea agreement.

On August 20, Allen appeared at a status hearing in shackles. His defense team filed a motion for him to appear unrestrained in future hearings, which was denied. On October 29, the judge scheduled jury selection to begin on September 7, 2027. The trial is expected to last three to four weeks. Prosecutors had proposed a May 2027 start date, but the judge granted the defense additional preparation time.

== Aftermath ==
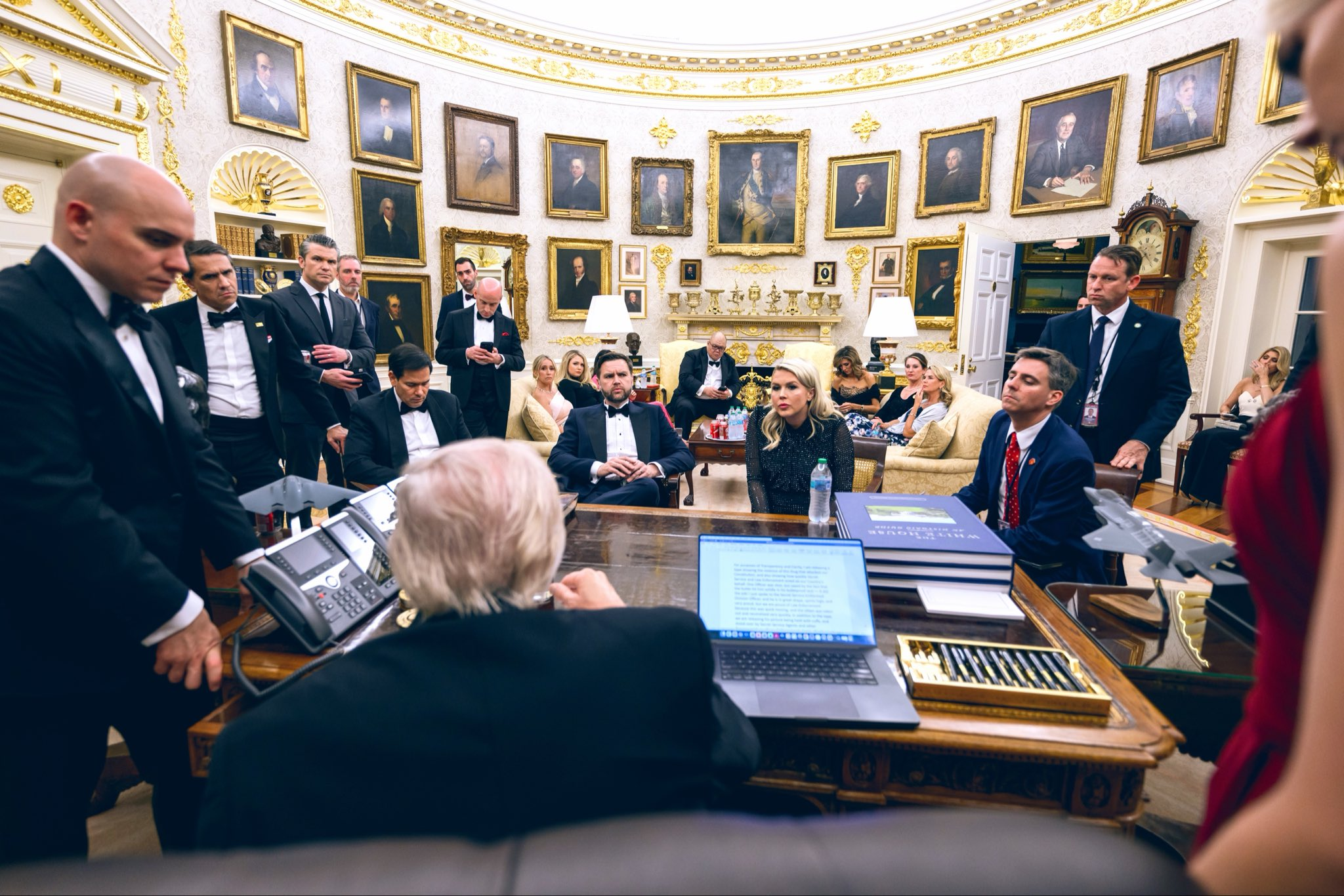
President Donald Trump holding a meeting inside the Oval Office with cabinet members immediately after the shooting

Shortly after 9:00 p.m. EDT, WHCA president Weijia Jiang addressed the ballroom from the stage, announcing that the program would continue momentarily. At approximately 9:20 p.m. EDT, security personnel began clearing out the ballroom, effectively canceling the event for the evening. Jiang later announced from the stage that Trump planned to give a briefing from the White House and that the dinner would be rescheduled within 30 days.

Sources told CBS News that the suspect had told law enforcement he was trying to shoot officials from the Trump administration. The day after the shooting, the Department of Justice announced that "preliminary findings" suggested Trump was the intended target.

Other media galas planned for the same night in Washington, D.C., continued unabated including events associated with Substack, MS NOW, and Time. Oz Pearlman, who had been entertaining Trump at the Correspondents' Dinner in the moments before the shooting, arrived at the MS NOW event feeling "shook up" but glad that the parties were going on.

A video game Allen created was removed from Steam by the Valve Corporation in response to negative reactions after Allen was arrested.

King Charles III and Queen Camilla made a state visit to the United States from April 27 to 30, meeting both Donald Trump and the First Lady. After the shooting, Buckingham Palace announced that the state visit would go ahead as planned, but that the shooting incident resulted in increased security, though specifics have not been announced. Charles referenced the attack during his address to Congress, stating that "such acts of violence will never succeed."

== Responses ==
=== Federal ===
President Trump addresses the press two hours after the shooting.

Shortly after the incident, Trump posted on Truth Social: "Quite an evening in D.C. Secret Service and Law Enforcement did a fantastic job. They acted quickly and bravely. The shooter has been apprehended, and I have recommended that we 'LET THE SHOW GO ON' but will entirely be guided by Law Enforcement." In a subsequent post, Trump wrote that law enforcement had requested all attendees leave and confirmed that the first lady, vice president, and all Cabinet members were "in perfect condition." He also stated the event would be rescheduled within 30 days and later held a press conference from the White House Briefing Room.

During the briefing that evening, Trump said the venue "was not a particularly secure building" and used it as support for the existence of the White House Ballroom. He also doubted any connection of the shooter with the 2026 Iran war and said it would not stop him from "winning the war in Iran". Former president Barack Obama condemned the assassination attempt against Trump.

On April 27, Donald and Melania Trump both accused talk show host Jimmy Kimmel of inciting violence against them and of strengthening the political rift within America; they both called for him to be fired from ABC immediately. Three days before the shooting, Kimmel made a joke on his show while pretending to be the host of the upcoming White House Correspondents' Dinner, stating "Our first lady Melania is here...So beautiful, Mrs Trump, you have a glow like an expectant widow." Kimmel responded to the accusations, stating that the joke was made days before the incident and that it has been based around their age difference and Melania's poker face during most events and reiterated that he was against any form of gun violence. On April 28, the Federal Communications Commission (FCC) announced that it is accelerating the review of eight local broadcasting licenses used by ABC. On April 30, FCC Chairman Brendan Carr said the order was not related to Trump's call for Kimmel to be fired.

==== US Secret Service ====
The US Secret Service issued an official statement confirming an investigation had begun and that all protectees were safe: "The U.S. Secret Service, in coordination with the Metropolitan Police Department, is investigating a shooting incident near the main magnetometer screening area at the White House Correspondents' dinner. The president and first lady are safe along [with] all protectees."

=== Greater Los Angeles ===
A computer science professor at California State University, Dominguez Hills, told the Associated Press that Allen took a few of his classes before graduating with a master's degree in computer science in 2025. He described Allen as "a very good student indeed, always sitting in the first row of my class, paying attention, and frequently emailing me with coursework questions", adding that he was very shocked to hear that Allen was the suspect in the attack.

A former Pacific Lutheran High School volleyball teammate from Gardena told KNBC-TV that Allen had attended Pacific Lutheran for all four years and was part of the school's volleyball team. He noted Allen's curiosity and intelligence, describing him as a “borderline genius” and “super stable”.

Neighbors who spoke to the Los Angeles Times said that Allen had just moved to the Old Torrance area six months prior to the attack. A pastor at Pasadena United Reformed Church told National Public Radio that Allen had attended his services while at California Institute of Technology from September 2013 until graduating in June 2017 with a Bachelor of Science degree, describing Allen as a "nice, gentle, smart young man", a "good guy" and "quiet".

Torrance mayor George K. Chen condemned the violence in Washington.

=== International ===
Many world leaders (Note: Including Anthony Albanese of Australia, Ilham Aliyev of Azerbaijan, Lula da Silva of Brazil, Mark Carney of Canada, Luis Abinader of the Dominican Republic, Emmanuel Macron of France, Friedrich Merz of Germany, Viktor Orbán of Hungary, Narendra Modi of India, Benjamin Netanyahu of Israel, Giorgia Meloni of Italy, Sanae Takaichi of Japan, Joseph Aoun of Lebanon, Claudia Sheinbaum of Mexico, Shehbaz Sharif of Pakistan, Mahmoud Abbas of Palestine, Pedro Sánchez of Spain, Ahmed al-Sharaa of Syria, Lai Ching-te of Taiwan, Recep Tayyip Erdoğan of Turkey, Charles III and Keir Starmer of the United Kingdom, Delcy Rodríguez of Venezuela, and Ursula von der Leyen of the European Union) condemned the shooting as an act of political violence, while also expressing relief that all attendees were safe.

The condemnation from Ukraine was made by Foreign Minister Andrii Sybiha, and not President Volodymyr Zelenskyy. This has been interpreted as a sign of the Ukrainian president's growing frustration with the U.S. approach to the Russia-Ukraine war under Trump's presidency.

== Analysis ==
El País's correspondent Iker Seisdedos characterized the shooting as "another sign of the increasingly tense atmosphere in the United States". Seisdedos placed the incident in the context of recent political violence in the United States, citing attacks or plots targeting figures including Steve Scalise, Gretchen Whitmer, Brett Kavanaugh, Paul Pelosi, and Charlie Kirk.

Luke Broadwater, White House correspondent for The New York Times, discussed the shooting in the context of security concerns and recent threats against Trump. David Smith, the Washington bureau chief for The Guardian, wrote that the incident reflected the prevalence of political violence in the United States and noted that Trump himself had been criticized in the past for violent suggestions, such as purging the US of crime on "one really violent day". After the shooting, Aaron Blake of CNN wrote about an emerging split reality in the US, explaining how the reaction to recent acts of political violence reflected increasingly warped views of the perpetrators from people from both the left and the right, as well as how both sides were overwhelmingly likely to blame the other for those acts.

== Misinformation and conspiracy theories ==
Media and fact checkers reported that conspiracy theories and unsupported claims rapidly circulated following the shooting at the Correspondents' Dinner. This surge of conspiracy theories was described and commented on by national and international media, often attributing it to distrust in the institutions (the government, the media themselves) and mutual distrust by both sides of the political spectrum.

Donie O'Sullivan discussed how prominent former Trump's supporters like Tucker Carlson and Marjorie Taylor Greene have recently questioned the official narrative on the attempted assassination of Donald Trump in Pennsylvania, and quotes Keith Olbermann and Cenk Uygur blaming Trump's and his administration's mendacity for their own mistrust of their statements. NBC News described and analyzed the fast spread of misinformation, stating that "Conspiracy theories and a knee-jerk skepticism of current events have become the default response for a growing number of Americans, deepened by the loss of trust in institutions and supercharged by starkly partisan politics." White House Press Secretary Karoline Leavitt called the conspiracy theories "crazy nonsense"; Trump called them "sick".

=== "Staged" allegations ===
One of the main reported false narratives was claims that the entire event was faked for political gain. On Bluesky, many users posted "STAGED", echoing the response to the Trump assassination attempt in Butler, Pennsylvania, in 2024, whereas on X, others claimed that the shooting was staged to increase support for Trump's plan to build a new ballroom in the White House. Other reasons given for staging the shooting were Trump's low approval ratings, and his actions in the 2026 Iran war. Comments from Leavitt and her husband Nicholas Riccio in particular were seen as them having prior knowledge of the shooting: Leavitt told Fox News shortly before "There will be some shots fired tonight in the room" in apparent reference to a planned speech of Trump. Snopes notes that in English "[t]he phrase 'shots fired' is a common figure of speech that refers to someone making jokes or jabs at another person. There was no evidence that Leavitt's comment referenced the shooting before it happened." Fox correspondent Aishah Hasnie reported that Riccio emphasized she "need[ed] to be very safe" at the event; while recounting this to the network, Hasnie's call cut out, causing speculation that Fox News was suppressing her account. Hasnie cited poor cell reception for the call dropping and clarified: "To finish the story, he was telling me to be careful with my own safety because the world is crazy."

Social media users claimed that a picture allegedly showing Trump standing behind a curtain observing the commotion at the ballroom proved that the shooting had been staged; that claim was shared in posts that reached millions of users of Bluesky, Facebook, Instagram, Threads, TikTok, and X. Snopes reported that even if the photo is authentic, the man in it is not Trump.

=== False information about the suspect ===
An X user named True Promise claimed that information gleaned from Google Trends indicated that the suspect's name had been searched hundreds of times in Israel a day before the incident. According to the Free Press Journal, this idea was debunked. Another widely spread social media post asserted that he had been seen wearing a sweatshirt associated with the Israel Defense Force, but this claim could not be independently confirmed. A viral image of a passport belonging to an Indian woman, who was supposedly married to the suspect, was in fact an AI-generated forgery.

== See also ==
- 2026 in Washington, D.C.
