= Stephen Colbert at the 2006 White House Correspondents' Dinner =

Satirical performance by American comedian

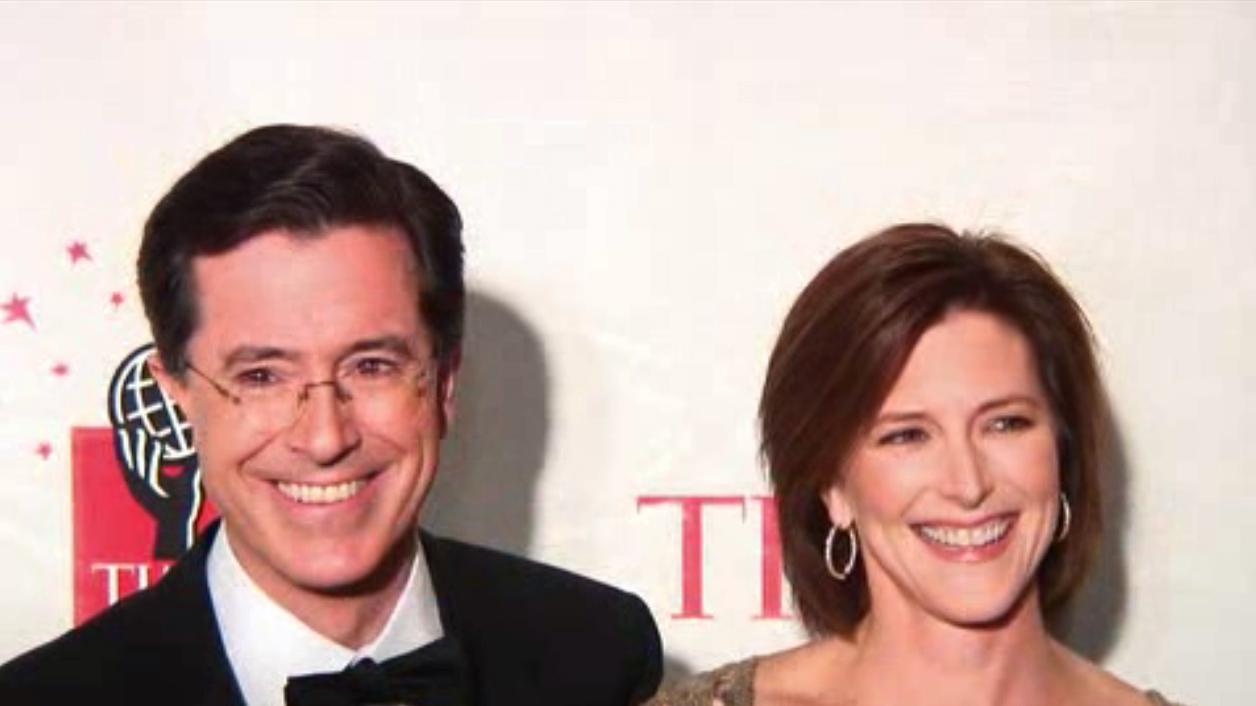
Stephen Colbert and his wife, Evelyn McGee, at the Time 100 most influential people awards for 2006

On April 29, 2006, American comedian Stephen Colbert appeared as the featured entertainer at the 2006 White House Correspondents' Association Dinner, which was held in Washington, D.C., at the Hilton Washington hotel. Colbert's performance, consisting of a 16-minute podium speech and a 7-minute video presentation, was broadcast live across the United States on the cable television networks C-SPAN and MSNBC. Standing a few feet from U.S. president George W. Bush, in front of an audience of celebrities, politicians, and members of the White House Press Corps, Colbert delivered a controversial satirical routine targeting the president and the media. He spoke in the persona of the character he played on Comedy Central's The Colbert Report, a parody of conservative pundits such as Bill O'Reilly and Sean Hannity.

Colbert's performance quickly became an Internet and media sensation. Commentators remarked on the humor of Colbert's performance and the political nature of his remarks and speculated as to whether there was a cover-up by the media in the way the event was reported. James Poniewozik of Time noted that whether or not one liked the speech, it had become a "political-cultural touchstone issue of 2006—like whether you drive a hybrid or use the term 'freedom fries'".

== Performance at the dinner ==
American comedian Stephen Colbert was the featured entertainer at the White House Correspondents' Association Dinner, held at the Hilton Washington hotel in Washington, D.C., on April 29, 2006. He was invited to speak by Mark Smith, the outgoing president of the White House Press Corps Association. Smith later told reporters that he had not seen much of Colbert's work. Since 1983, the event has featured well-known stand-up comics. Previous performances included President Gerald Ford and Chevy Chase making fun of Ford's alleged clumsiness in 1975, and Ronald Reagan and Rich Little performing together in 1981.

Colbert gave his after-dinner remarks in front of an audience described by the Associated Press as a "Who's Who of power and celebrity". More than 2,500 guests attended the event, including First Lady Laura Bush, Chairman of the Joint Chiefs of Staff Peter Pace, U.S. attorney general Alberto Gonzales, China's ambassador Zhou Wenzhong, AOL co-founder Steve Case, model and tennis player Anna Kournikova, and actor George Clooney. Colbert spoke directly to President Bush several times, satirically praising his foreign policy, lifestyle, and beliefs, and referring to his declining approval rating and popular reputation.

Colbert spoke in the persona of the character he played on Comedy Central's The Colbert Report, a parody of a conservative pundit in the fashion of Bill O'Reilly and Sean Hannity. He began by satirizing mass surveillance, joking "If anybody needs anything else at their tables, just speak slowly and clearly into your table numbers. Someone from the NSA will be right over with a cocktail." While many of his jokes were directed at President Bush, he also lampooned the journalists and other figures present at the dinner. Most of the speech was prepared specifically for the event, Colbert's long-time writing partner, Paul Dinello, helped him with the text, and together they went over it the night before. But several segments were lifted—largely unchanged—from The Colbert Report, including parts of the "truthiness" monologue from the first episode of the show, where Colbert advocated speaking from "the gut" rather than the brain and denounced books as "all fact, no heart". Colbert framed this part of the speech as though he were agreeing with Bush's philosophies, saying that he and Bush are "not brainiacs on the nerd patrol", implicitly criticizing the way Bush positioned himself as an anti-intellectual.

Following this introduction to his style and philosophy, Colbert listed a series of absurd "beliefs that I live by", such as "I believe in America. I believe it exists." He alluded to outsourcing to China and satirized the traditional Republican opposition to "big government" by referring to the Iraq War. "I believe the government that governs best is the government that governs least. And by these standards, we have set up a fabulous government in Iraq."

Colbert then mocked Bush's sinking approval ratings:

Now, I know there are some polls out there saying this man has a 32 percent approval rating. But guys like us, we don't pay attention to the polls. We know that polls are just a collection of statistics that reflect what people are thinking in reality. And reality has a well-known liberal bias ... Sir, pay no attention to the people who say the glass is half empty, [...] because 32 percent means it's two-thirds empty. There's still some liquid in that glass, is my point. But I wouldn't drink it. The last third is usually backwash.

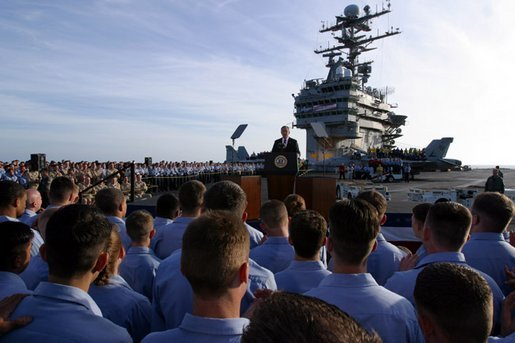
U.S. president George W. Bush gives the "Mission Accomplished" speech aboard the USS Abraham Lincoln (CVN-72).

He continued his mock defense of Bush by satirizing Bush's appearances aboard the USS Abraham Lincoln, at the site of the collapsed World Trade Center, and in cities devastated by Hurricane Katrina:

I stand by this man. I stand by this man because he stands for things. Not only for things, he stands on things. Things like aircraft carriers, and rubble, and recently flooded city squares. And that sends a strong message: that no matter what happens to America, she will always rebound—with the most powerfully staged photo ops in the world.

Colbert ended the monologue specifically directed at Bush by parodying his energy policy. He then used Laura Bush's reading initiative as a springboard to mock-criticize books for being "elitist", and harshly criticized the White House Press Corps—hosts of the event—and the media in general. Addressing the audience, he remarked:

Over the last five years, you people were so good—over tax cuts, WMD intelligence, the effect of global warming. We Americans didn't want to know, and you had the courtesy not to try to find out, [...] And then you write, [...] "Oh, they're just rearranging the deck chairs on the Titanic." First of all, that is a terrible metaphor. This administration is not sinking. This administration is soaring. If anything, they are rearranging the deck chairs on the Hindenburg!

Colbert also criticized the White House Press Corps for what was widely perceived as its reluctance to question the administration's policies, particularly in regard to the lead up to the 2003 invasion of Iraq, saying:

But, listen, let's review the rules. Here's how it works. The President makes decisions. He's the decider. The press secretary announces those decisions, and you people of the press type those decisions down. Make, announce, type. Just put 'em through a spell check and go home. Get to know your family again. Make love to your wife. Write that novel you got kicking around in your head. You know, the one about the intrepid Washington reporter with the courage to stand up to the administration? You know, fiction!

For the remainder of his speech, Colbert joked about other people in the audience, including Peter Pace, Antonin Scalia, John McCain, and Joe Wilson. During this section, he made another reference to global warming while talking about interviewing Jesse Jackson: "You can ask him anything, but he's going to say what he wants, at the pace that he wants. It's like boxing a glacier. Enjoy that metaphor, by the way, because your grandchildren will have no idea what a glacier is."

Colbert received a chilly reception from the audience. His jokes were often met with silence and muttering, although some in the audience, such as Scalia, laughed heartily as Colbert teased them. This was in stark contrast to the warm reception accorded to a skit featuring Bush and his look-alike, Steve Bridges, which immediately preceded Colbert's monologue.

At the end of his monologue, Colbert introduced what he characterized as an "audition" video to become the new White House press secretary—Scott McClellan had recently left the position. The video spliced clips of difficult questions from the White House press corps with responses from Colbert as Press Secretary. Colbert's podium included controls marked "Eject", "Gannon" (a reference to erstwhile White House reporter Jeff Gannon, who was suspected of asking planted questions), and "Volume", which he used to silence a critical question from journalist David Gregory. The video continued with Colbert fleeing the briefing room and the White House, only to be pursued by White House correspondent Helen Thomas, who had been a vocal critic of the Bush administration. At one point, Colbert picks up an emergency phone and explains that Thomas "won't stop asking why we invaded Iraq". The dispatcher responds with, "Hey, why did we invade Iraq?" The entire second half of the video is a spoof of horror film clichés, particularly the film Westworld, with melodramatic music accompanying Thomas's slow, unwavering pursuit of Colbert, and Colbert loudly screaming "No!" at intervals. Widely available online, a portion of the mock audition tape aired on The Colbert Report on May 2, 2006.

Although President Bush shook Colbert's hand after his presentation, several of Bush's aides and supporters walked out during Colbert's speech, and one former aide commented that the President had "that look that he's ready to blow". At a panel moderated by Stone Philips, Colbert mentioned that a joke got cut halfway through his presentation. He was supposed to give the president a 'Certificate of Presidency', a piece of paper that said "I, Stephen Colbert, hereby recognize George W. Bush is president of the United States." Colbert reflected, "At that point in the speech, 'cause it was right about the middle, I looked over and I went, I'm not going to do that." He kept the certificate framed on his wall as a memento. Colbert recalled that "not a lot of people laughed in the front row" during the speech, and that "when it was over, no one was even making eye contact with me ... no one is talking to me in the whole damn room"; only Scalia came to him afterward, praising Colbert's imitation of a gesture the justice had recently been photographed making. He also noted that actor Harry Lennix, who was there that night, praised the performance.

== Early press coverage ==
Cable channel C-SPAN broadcast the White House Correspondents' Dinner live, and rebroadcast the event several times in the next 24 hours, but aired a segment that excluded Colbert's speech. The trade journal Editor & Publisher was the first news outlet to report in detail on Colbert's performance, calling it a "blistering comedy 'tribute'" that did not make the Bushes laugh. The reviewer noted that others on the podium were uncomfortable during the speech, "perhaps feeling the material was a little too biting—or too much speaking 'truthiness' to power".

The New York Times and the Chicago Tribune covered the dinner, but not Colbert's remarks. The wire services Reuters and the Associated Press each devoted three paragraphs to discuss Colbert's routine in their coverage of the event, and The Washington Post mentioned Colbert several times throughout its article. The most extensive print coverage came from USA Today, which dedicated more space to Colbert's performance than to President Bush's skit. The day after the dinner, Howard Kurtz played clips of Colbert's performance on his CNN show Reliable Sources. On the Fox News show Fox & Friends, the hosts mentioned Colbert's performance, criticizing him for going "over the line". Tucker Carlson, a frequent target of The Colbert Report before and after the event, criticized Colbert as being "unfunny" on his MSNBC show Tucker.

Much of the initial coverage of the event highlighted the difference between the reaction to Bush and Bridges (very positive) and that for Colbert (far more muted). "The president killed. He's a tough act to follow—at all times," said Colbert. On his show, Colbert joked that the unenthusiastic reception was actually "very respectful silence" and added that the crowd "practically carried me out on their shoulders" even though he was not ready to leave. On the May 1, 2006, episode of The Daily Show, on which Colbert had formerly been a correspondent, host Jon Stewart called Colbert's performance "balls-alicious" and stated, "We've never been prouder of our Mr. Colbert, and, ah—holy shit!"

Lloyd Grove, gossip columnist for the New York Daily News, said that Colbert "bombed badly", and BET founder Bob Johnson remarked, "It was an insider crowd, as insider a crowd as you'll ever have, and [Colbert] didn't do the insider jokes". Congressional Quarterly columnist and CBS commentator Craig Crawford found Colbert's performance hilarious, but observed that most other people at the dinner did not find the speech amusing. Time magazine TV critic James Poniewozik thought that Colbert's critics missed the point: "Colbert wasn't playing to the room, I suspect, but to the wide audience of people who would later watch on the Internet. If anything, he was playing against the room." Poniewozik called the pained, uncomfortable reactions to Colbert's jokes "the money shots. They were the whole point."

== Allegations of a media blackout ==
Some commentators, while noting the popularity of Colbert's dinner speech, were critical of the perceived snubbing he was receiving from the press corps, even though he was the featured entertainer for the evening. The Washington Post columnist Dan Froomkin, calling it "The Colbert Blackout", lambasted the traditional media for ignoring Colbert while focusing on the "much safer" topic of President Bush's routine with Bridges. Amy Goodman of Democracy Now noted that initial coverage ignored Colbert entirely. Columbia University Graduate School of Journalism professor Todd Gitlin remarked, "It's too hot to handle. [Colbert] was scathing toward Bush and it was absolutely devastating. [The mainstream media doesn't] know how to handle such a pointed and aggressive criticism."

Others saw no intentional snub of Colbert by the press. Responding to a question about why The Washington Post's article about the dinner did not go into any detail about Colbert's speech, Media Backtalk writer Howard Kurtz responded, "The problem in part is one of deadline. The presses were already rolling by the time Colbert came on at 10:30, so the story had to be largely written by then." Asked why television news favored Bush's performance over Colbert's, Elizabeth Fishman, an assistant dean at the Columbia School of Journalism and a former 60 Minutes producer, told MTV that the "quick hit" for television news shows would have been to use footage of Bush standing beside his impersonator. "It's an easier set up for visual effect", she noted. Steve Scully, president of the White House Correspondents' Association (which hosted the dinner) and political editor of C-SPAN (which broadcast the dinner), scoffed at the whole idea of the press intentionally ignoring Colbert: "Bush hit such a home run with Steve Bridges that he got all of the coverage. I think that exceeded expectations. There was no right-wing conspiracy or left-wing conspiracy." Time columnist Ana Marie Cox dismissed allegations of a deliberate media blackout, because Colbert's performance received coverage in The New York Times, The Washington Post, and the major wire services. Fellow commentator Kurtz concurred, noting that the video was carried on C-SPAN and was freely available online; he also played two clips on his own show. "Apparently I didn't get the memo," he said.

In an article published on May 3, 2006, The New York Times addressed the controversy. The paper acknowledged that the mainstream media—itself included—had been criticized for focusing on Bush's act with Bridges while ignoring Colbert's speech. The paper then quoted several passages of Colbert's more substantial criticism of the president and discussed various reactions to the event. On May 15, The New York Times' public editor, Byron Calame, wrote on his blog that more than two hundred readers had written to complain about the exclusion of any mention of Colbert from the paper's initial lengthy article covering the dinner. Calame quoted his deputy bureau chief in Washington, who said that a mention of Colbert in the first article could not have been long enough to do his routine justice. But he also noted that the paper should have printed an in-depth article specifically covering Colbert's speech in the same issue, rather than waiting until days after the fact.

== Internet popularity ==
Even though Colbert's performance "landed with a thud" among the live audience, clips of Colbert at the dinner were an overnight sensation, becoming viral videos that appeared on numerous web sites in several forms. Sites offering the video experienced massive increases in traffic. According to CNET's News.com site, Colbert's speech was "one of the Internet's hottest acts". Searches for Colbert on Yahoo! were up 5,625 percent. During the days after the speech, there were twice as many Google searches for "C-SPAN" as for "Jennifer Aniston"—an uncommon occurrence—as well as a surge in Colbert-related searches. Nielsen BuzzMetrics ranked the post of the video clip as the second most popular blog post for all of 2006. Clips of Colbert's comic tribute climbed to the number 1, 2, and 3 spots atop YouTube's "Most Viewed" video list. The various clips of Colbert's speech had been viewed 2.7 million times in less than 48 hours. In an unprecedented move for the network, C-SPAN demanded that YouTube and iFilm remove unauthorized copies of the video from their sites. Google Video subsequently purchased the exclusive rights to retransmit the video, and it remained at or near the top of Google's most popular videos for the next two weeks.

Both Editor and Publisher and Salon, which published extensive and early coverage of the Colbert speech, drew record and near-record numbers of viewers to their web sites. 70,000 articles were posted to blogs about Colbert's roast of Bush on the Thursday after the event, the most of any topic, and "Colbert" remained the top search term at Technorati for days. Chicago Sun-Times TV critic Doug Elfman credited the Internet with promoting an event that would have otherwise been overlooked, stating that "Internet stables for liberals, like the behemoth dailykos.com, began rumbling as soon as the correspondents' dinner was reported in the mainstream press, with scant word of Colbert's combustive address". Three weeks after the dinner, audio of Colbert's performance went on sale at the iTunes Music Store and became the No. 1 album purchased, outselling new releases by the Red Hot Chili Peppers, Pearl Jam, and Paul Simon. The CEO of Audible.com, which provided the recording sold at iTunes, explained its success by saying, "you had to not be there to get it". It continued to be a top download at iTunes for the next five months.

== Response ==
Colbert's performance received a variety of reactions from the media. In Washington, the response from both politicians and the press corps was negative—both groups having been targets of Colbert's satire. The Washington press corps felt that Colbert had bombed. The Washington Post columnist Richard Cohen found that Colbert's jokes were "lame and insulting" and wrote that Colbert was "rude" and a "bully". Politician Steny Hoyer felt that Colbert had gone too far, telling the newspaper The Hill that "[Bush] is the President of the United States, and he deserves some respect". Conservative pundit Mary Matalin called Colbert's performance a "predictable, Bush-bashing kind of humor". Columnist Ana Marie Cox chastised those who praised Colbert as a hero: "I somehow doubt that Bush has never heard these criticisms before". She added, "Comedy can have a political point but it is not political action".

On The Daily Show, Jon Stewart remarked, tongue in cheek, "apparently [Colbert] was under the impression that they'd hired him to do what he does every night on television". While comics were expected to tell jokes about the administration, the 2006 dinner was held at a time when the relationship between the administration and the media was under great strain, and the administration was sensitive to criticism. Attorney and columnist Julie Hilden concluded that Colbert's "vituperative parody" might have been unfair under different circumstances, but noted that Bush's record of controlling bad press created a heightened justification for people to criticize him when they got the chance. Media Matters and Editor & Publisher came to Colbert's defense, calling his detractors hypocrites. They contrasted the critical reaction to Colbert to the praise that many in the press had for a controversial routine that Bush performed at a similar media dinner in 2004, where Bush was shown looking for WMDs in the Oval Office and joking, "Those weapons of mass destruction must be somewhere!" and "Nope, no weapons over there!"

Canadian Broadcasting Corporation News Online columnist Heather Mallick wrote, "Colbert had the wit and raw courage to do to Bush what Mark Antony did to Brutus, murderer of Caesar. As the American media has self-destructed, it takes Colbert to damn Bush with devastatingly ironic praise." Comedian and eventual Democratic U.S. Senator Al Franken, who performed at similar dinners twice during the Bill Clinton administration, admired what Colbert had done. In its year-end issue, New York magazine described Colbert's performance as one of the most "brilliant" moments of 2006. Time's James Poniewozik noted that in the "days after Stephen Colbert performed at the White House Correspondents' Dinner, this has become the political-cultural touchstone issue of 2006—like whether you drive a hybrid or use the term 'freedom fries'".

For the 2007 dinner, the White House Correspondents' Association brought back the less controversial Rich Little. Arianna Huffington reported that Colbert told her he had specifically avoided reading any reviews of his performance, and remained unaware of the public's reaction. On June 13, 2007, he was presented with a Spike TV Guys' Choice Award for "Gutsiest Move". He accepted the award via video conference. Six months later, New York Times columnist Frank Rich called Colbert's after-dinner speech a "cultural primary", christening it the "defining moment" of the United States' 2006 midterm elections. Three and a half years after the speech, Frank Rich referred to it again, calling it "brilliant" and "good for the country", while columnist Dan Savage referred to it as "one of the things that kept people like me sane during the darkest days of the Bush years". The editor of The Realist, Paul Krassner, later put Colbert's performance in historical context, saying that it stands out among contemporary US satire as the only example of the spirit of the satire of Lenny Bruce, George Carlin, and Richard Pryor, which took risks and broke barriers to free speech, "rather than just proudly exercising it as comedians do now."
