= List of The Colbert Report episodes (2007) =

- No. of episodes: 138

Release
- Original network: Comedy Central

Season chronology
- ← Previous; 2005–06 episodes Next → 2008 episodes

This is a list of episodes for The Colbert Report in 2007.

== 2007 ==
=== January ===
No.	"The Wørd"	Guest(s)	Introductory phrase	Original release date	Prod. code
194	"Facts"	Ethan Nadelmann	"On the 15th day of Christmas, your true love gave you me. This is The Colbert Report!"	January 8	3001
Stephen opens the show disappointed that Saddam Hussein was suddenly hanged over the show's break. He responds to Lake Superior State University's ban of the word 'truthiness' in "Who's Attacking Me Now?", and gay.com's naming of Colbert as Person of the Year in "Who's Honoring Me Now?"; gives "Stephen's Sound Advice" for getting over the winter blues.
195	"Texas Hold 'Em"	Jim Cramer	"I'm the frosting on America's cake! Tonight, I'll let you lick the bowl. This is The Colbert Report!"	January 9	3002
Freem replaces superstantial in the opening sequence. Colbert thanks former Archbishop of Warsaw Stanisław Wielgus for being caught in a Catholic church scandal of a non-sexual nature; scorns Democrats for taking a day off Congress for the college football National Championship game, with quick suggestion of taking a day off for an Ontario Junior League Hockey game; begins new segment "We the MEdiator" to pick sides in celebrity feuds, featuring Rosie O'Donnell vs. Donald Trump, Angelina Jolie vs. Madonna, and Amitabh Bachchan vs. Shahrukh Khan; and ends the show in tribute to James Brown by declaring himself the new "hardest working man in show business".
196	"Worry"	David Kamp	"Who's buried in Grant's Tomb? Give up? I hope the police do too. This is The Colbert Report!"	January 10	3003
Stephen criticizes Bush for not sending 300 million troops as Colbert advised the day before but he pardons him if this is "the only mistake he makes in this war". He then talks about illegal immigration in a new segment called "Invasion of the Country Snatchers" and about the new Democratic senator of Missouri and its liberal legislation in the Wørd-Segment. After the break there is a new episode of Stephen's Tek Jansen adventures.
197	"None"	Ken Roth, Judy Woodruff	"Tonight's show is an anagram. Can you unscramble it in time? This is The Colbert Report!"	January 11	3004
Stephen starts with another episode of his challenge "What Number is Stephen thinking of?" with a clip from 2005. He then celebrates 5 years of Guantanamo Bay and talks to the executive director of Human Rights Watch, Ken Roth. After that he does a "Tip of the Hat/Wag of the finger", double-wagging Apple (claiming this is his first double-wag) for 1) changing their name to "Apple, Inc." and 2) bringing out the iPhone. He urges Apple to stop bundling new apps into gizmos, before they start coming after John Connor. He then talks to Judy Woodruff about the "Generation Next", blaming Jon Stewart when he hears that most young people are liberal-minded.
198	"Victory!"	Alex Kuczynski	"Don't watch tonight's show if you're in jail, because the truth will set you free. This is The Colbert Report."	January 15	3005
Wishing viewers a happy Martin Luther King, Jr. Day, Colbert calls for a nationwide lie-in to refuse engaging in "anything at all", in the style of passive protest such as Rosa Parks, then attacks Senator Barbara Boxer for comments suggesting Condoleezza Rice has no personal ties to the Iraq War. Colbert praises the army for lowering recruitment expectations to be filled; channels last week's guest Jim Cramer for a new financial segment "Stephen's Bears and Balls" focusing on real estate, oil, Cingular's name change, soy milk, and beef jerky.
199	"Symbolic"	Dinesh D'Souza	"Before we begin, I need to do my vocal warm-ups. Me, me, me, me, me, me! This is The Colbert Report."	January 16	3006
In anticipation of Bill O'Reilly arriving in-studio on Thursday, Colbert lashes out at Jimmy the director for a squeaky chair. In a new segment "Invasion of the Country Snatchers", Colbert profiles immigration issues, from an Italian-descended anti-immigrant possible Presidential nominee, to a chain of pizza restaurants which accept pesos, segueing into Letters from Iwo Jima winning the Best foreign Film Golden Globe. In another "Stephen Colbert's Sport Report", Colbert covers David Beckham playing for Los Angeles, and an anti-Colbert movement of fans throwing teddy bears on the ice when the Saginaw Spirit played the Oshawa Generals in the Ontario Hockey League.
200	"None"	Lynn Swann, Richard A. Clarke	"It's our 200th episode, our bi-centennial: Where is my commemorative quarter, U.S. mint?! This is The Colbert Report!"	January 17	3007
Still in anticipation of Bill O'Reilly arriving in-studio on Thursday Colbert is more nervous than the day before, bringing out some cherished objects he plans to show O'Reilly the next day. He then talks about the NFL play-offs with Lynn Swann, trying to trash talk all teams except the New Orleans Saints who he favors. After the break "Better know a district" continues with Washington's 3rd congressional district representative, Brian Baird.
201	"Go It Alone"	Bill O'Reilly	"Caution, you are about to watch me enter a no spin zone. This is The Colbert Report!"	January 18	3008
The big day is here, so Colbert is crazy with anticipation that Bill O'Reilly will be on the show, stating that his only goal with this show was to see this day, which makes him reveal a "Mission Accomplished" banner and open the last door on his "Bill O'Reilly advent calendar" (in which he finds Geraldo's mustache). He then turns back to US politics talking about Bush's plans to rise the troop levels in Iraq. He then talks about fights between celebrities on his segment "We the MEdiator", rethinking his last week's judgements.
202	"Exact Words"	Thomas Schaller	"Hey America. I was thinking if you're not busy for the next half-hour, maybe you'd like to, I don't know, you know, watch the show? It's not a date or anything; we're just hanging out. This is The Colbert Report!"	January 22	3009
Stephen is disappointed at the loss by the New Orleans Saints to the Chicago "God-less killing Machines" Bears. In another "Who's Riding My Coattails Now?", Colbert calls out Bill Clinton for speaking at Knox College after Colbert already had, and artist Terence Koh for selling sperm (in his art) after Stephen's Formula 401 line. The Word is based on the refusal of Alberto Gonzales to admit a right of the people not stated specifically in the Constitution. In another "Stephen Colbert's Balls For Kidz", gambling is discussed.
203	"None"	Michael S. Steele	"Stay tuned for 22 minutes of highlights from tonight's show. This is The Colbert Report."	January 23	3010
Stephen explains that this is the second of two episodes they taped on January 22, so that he can host a State of the Union address party on the 23rd. Russ Lieber appears in-studio to comment on new laws of the Democrat-controlled Congress. A new Threatdown is "Media Watchdog" themed. The episode ends with Colbert asking the audience if they want to do another 22 minutes.
204	"Great News"	Lou Dobbs	"Cleanliness is next to Godliness: Churches, fill your baptismal fonts with Purell."	January 24	3011
Lou Dobbs, author of War on the Middle Class, faces the truth hammer when he sits down to talk with Stephen.
205	"S.M.A.F.U."	Mike Wallace	"Nation, It's time to grab the bull by the horns! If there are no horns, you're grabbing a cow, stop it! This is the Colbert Report!"	January 25	3012
Bill O'Reilly spills the beans on Stephen, and says what he really thought of him on his show. Colbert interviews Coach Bob Mancini of the Saginaw Spirit. And he doesn't like how he stands on the SMU dispute over Bush's library.
206	"Wikilobbying"	Barry Lando	"A, E, I, O, U, and sometimes Y? Consonant or vowel, make up your mind, we're at war. This is the Colbert Report!"	January 29	3013
Colbert wins bet with mayor of Oshawa after Saginaw Spirit defeated Oshawa Generals. Colbert discusses Microsoft paying Rick Jelliffe for Wikipedia edits, and concludes that truth has become a commodity. He offers on air five dollars to the first person to write "reality has become a commodity" on Wikipedia. Wag of the finger to Scientology, which named Tom Cruise as the "Christ" of the cult.
207	"None"	Donna Shalala	"I am the Hall to America's Oates. This is The Colbert Report!"	January 30	3014
Colbert opens the show by showing a clip from Fox News' Fox & Friends, talking about the invisible beam that makes a person think he is on fire. Colbert then talks about how he stole his neighbor's New York Times and argues with David Leonhardt about what one could do with $1.2 trillion. This is followed by a new segment, "Judge, Jury, and Executioner" and ends by revealing the new microwave (fitted with a Colbert Report logo) which he would be sending to Bill O'Reilly after stealing his earlier.
208	"Black sheep"	Jed Babbin	"Warning, the contents of USA Today are really about the USA yesterday. This is The Colbert Report!"	January 31	3015
Colbert opens the show by discussing the "problem" with Global warming and in protest replaces Bobby with a 5000 Watt heat lamp. This is followed by the return of the "On Notice" board and the introduction of the "Fantasies" board. Jane Fonda (his fantasy) and The Weather Channel are placed on notice and Lutherans and E Street Band are taken off. This is followed by the 39th installment of Better Know a District, with New York's 6th congressional district representative, Gregory Meeks.

=== February ===
No.	"The Wørd"	Guest(s)	Introductory phrase	Original release date	Prod. code
209	"We Shall Overcome"	Chuck Schumer	"Super Bowl Sunday isn't for three more days, but Colbert Report Thursday starts right now! This is The Colbert Report!"	February 1	3016
Colbert comments on the 2007 Boston Mooninite Scare that occurred in Boston and laments the fact that he can no longer proceed with his obviously threatening-looking advertisements. This is followed by the "Movies Destroying America" segment, commenting on Steve Carell's nomination and Ellen DeGeneres hosting. The show is ended by Colbert presenting "The Most Poetic F#@king Thing I've Ever Heard"
210	"Second Opinion"	Wendy Kopp	"Hey! Peyton Manning! I'm going to Disneyworld, too! Let's go halfsies on a Day Pass! This is The Colbert Report!"	February 5	3017
Colbert is ecstatic at the slaughtering the Bears underwent in Super Bowl XLI. Also, he introduces a new product "Formula 419" (A combination of his Formula 401 and 18, Peyton Manning's Jersey number). Then, Colbert notes that Stephen Jr. has returned from Canada and back into Washington (unfortunately in Washington's 3rd, where Better Known representative Brian Baird has lobbied for a new hunting law). Colbert asks residents of North Oregon to lure Stephen Jr. out. This is followed by the Threatdown: Energy Efficiency, Giant Mexican Babies, Naked People, Miss America, Valentine Candy. Valentine Candy is #1, for introducing new candy hearts which say "Bear Hug" on them.
211	"Making A Killing"	Charlie LeDuff	"I'm attacking American enemies like a spurned astronaut! This is The Colbert Report!"	February 6	3018
Colbert receives a message from Master Media International that they would be praying on his behalf on February 22. This is followed by the 40th installment of Better Know A District (Ohio's 18th with congressman Zack Space).
212	"Silence"	Steven Pinker	"Now's your chance to fall in love with Colbert Colbert all over again. This is The Colbert Report!"	February 7	3019
Colbert starts by introducing a new segment, "California Values Watch". After addressing San Francisco Mayor Gavin Newsom's recent problems. Then talks about the controversy stirred between Representatives Loretta Sanchez and Joe Baca. This is followed by the series finale of Tek Jansen.
213	"None"	Debra Dickerson, Chris Hedges	"And if you think this sounds good, then you will enjoy this show! This is The Colbert Report!"	February 8	3020
Stephen starts by talking about the astronaut incident on the news and especially that everyone talks about Lisa Nowak wearing a diaper, admitting that he too wears a diaper during his workday. He then claims that Henry Kissinger called him to get him to run for president, which he says he will "not" do (or will he?) but he has formed an exploratory committee on whether to form an exploratory committee. He then talks about Barack Obama's presidential chances with Debra Dickerson (who claims that Obama is not black in the traditional sense). After the break he talks about the Scooter Libby trial which he compares with the Salem Witch Trials in a segment called "Was it really that bad?"
214	"Inappropriate"	Michael Oppenheimer	"Happy birthday Charles Darwin, in Hell!! This is The Colbert Report."	February 12	3021
Stephen starts by dancing/singing "My Humps" behind his desk and discusses Grammys. He then talks about criticism of the Iraq War transitioning into "The Wørd." This is followed by a "Tip of the Hat – Wag of the Finger" segment, in which he commends Australian Prime Minister John Howard for his attack on Barack Obama, but also chastises him for attacking an American citizen. He then talks with guest Michael Oppenheimer about his climate change report. He closes by naming Bollywood iconic actor Amitabh Bachchan, who survived a camel kick to the head, "Alpha Dog of the Week."
215	"Frenemy"	Sheryl WuDunn	None, The episode starts right with the theme song.	February 13	3022
Colbert talks about the Chinese Menace, entitling a Colbert Report special report "Apocalypse Mao: Murdered By The Orient's Success".
216	"Bad Medicine"	Lance Armstrong	"Nation, be mine. This is The Colbert Report."	February 14	3023
Stephen makes correction, that the Chinese have four times more population than the US, not three. Colbert admonishes people teaching seniors about sex. Sport Report: about the Westminster Dog Show, the Sports Illustrated swimsuit edition, and mentions that the Saginaw Spirit had reached the playoffs.
217	"None"	Shashi Tharoor	"There is an 'I' in 'team' the way I spell it. This is the Colbert Report."	February 15	3024
Colbert talks about how Mastermedia International will pray for him on February 22. Asks J. J. Abrams how his prayer day went, with photo of Jimmie "J.J." Walker showing. Then he moves on, to talking about Helen Thomas losing her front row seat at the White House press room. Interviews Candice Bergen by phone about her prayer day too. Better Know A District guest was Vic Snyder from Arkansas's 2nd congressional district.
218	"Success"	Zev Chafets	"And... the award.. for the best adaptation of the truth.. goes to.. [Opens envelope, a la the Academy Awards] This is the Colbert Report!"	February 26	3025
Stephen compares Britain leaving Iraq to Britain leaving the U.S. and India – saying it will cause a flourish of Democracy.
219	"Recoil"	Craig Venter	"A portion of this program has been recorded at a frequency only dogs can hear." (Silently mouths "This is the Colbert Report.")	February 27	3026
Stephen comments on a recent report about Al Gore's energy usage. Outdoor Life fires a columnist for calling for an assault rifle ban, an action Colbert commends in the Wørd. Steagle Colbeagle the Eagle is named a top mascot, behind only the Toronto Raptor. As a result, the Toronto Raptors are moved from "on notice" to "dead to me." Tip/Wag: Wag to Bilk (Japanese beer + milk company), Tip to 107-year-old Chan Chi.
220	"None"	Nina Jablonski	"February, if you had any balls, you'd be three days longer. This is the Colbert Report."	February 28	3027
Colbert comments on how David Geffen has switched his support from Hillary Clinton to Barack Obama. Then he mentions how Tom Vilsack chickened out of the presidential race, and interviews him in a new segment, Profiles in Quitters. And Problems Without Solutions, special report about SAHD's (Stay-at-home dad's), which Colbert says is against nature's laws.

=== March ===
No.	"The Wørd"	Guest(s)	Introductory phrase	Original release date	Prod. code
221	"Bury The Lead"	Larry King	"Hey America, are you thinking what I'm thinking? You soon will be. This is The Colbert Report."	March 1	3028
Mr. Colbert thanks those who prayed for him last Thursday, with his prayer hat and foam fingers. Also he comments on the coverage of the Anna Nicole Smith story. Better Know A District guest was Steve Cohen from Tennessee's 9th congressional district.
222	"None"	Ben & Jerry, Mara Vanderslice	"Honk if you love the truth and please stop watching TV while you're driving. This is The Colbert Report."	March 5	3029
Stephen comments on how many politicians have visited Walter Reed Hospital since the scandal. Ben and Jerry appeared to promote their new ice cream flavor named in honor of Stephen. Bears & Balls segment about recent economic fluctuations. And Mara Vanderslice talked about how Democrats can adapt to reach out to Christians.
223	"WWJD [What Would Jesus Dispense]"	Mark Frauenfelder	"For best results, apply this program four times daily. This is The Colbert Report."	March 6	3030
Stephen brags about winning the Mega Millions drawing, which hadn't happened yet. In this segment he also mocks Viacom CEO Sumner Redstone. Then he talks about how Lewis "Scooter" Libby was found Not Guilty on 1 of the 5 counts. In The Word segment, Colbert commends doctors who refuse to treat patients for religious reasons. ThreatDown segment: No. 1 was Gravity.
224	"Don't"	Michael Specter	"Farewell Ernest Gallo. In your honor, I'm doing tonight's show hammered. This is The Colbert Report."	March 7	3031
Colbert makes a rare correction about winning Mega Millions drawing, and calls his boss Sumner Redstone to grovel. The Word was about removing the military Don't Ask, Don't Tell policy. Then there was 2007's first installment of "Easter Under Attack": proposed Easter Bunny name change to spring bunny. And Michael Specter talks about Vladimir Putin's suppression of and mysterious deaths of journalists in Russia.
225	"Comic Justice"	Ted Koppel	"You got to crack a few eggs to make an omelet. That's not a metaphor, I want someone to make me an omelet. This is The Colbert Report."	March 8	3032
Stephen wonders why the media is still discussing the Libby trial. Then he talks about the death of Captain America, and adds more in The Word. Better Know A District guest was John Yarmuth from Kentucky's 3rd congressional district.
226	"Home Field Advantage"	Nicholas Kristof	"Can anyone lend me 20 bucks? I can go to a cash machine after the show. This is The Colbert Report."	March 12	3033
Stephen upbraids Bill Gates for giving charitably to other nations while bemoaning America's faltering competitiveness. He retracts his disparaging comments about Captain America when he learns that the superhero has bequeathed him his shield.
227	"Goodnight"	Michael Eric Dyson	"I'm the host, which makes you my guests. Hope you brought some wine; it's polite. This is The Colbert Report."	March 13	3034
Stephen closes the show by announcing The Word ("Goodnight"), after which the credits roll.
228	"High Fidelity"	Ed Viesturs	"It's Pi Day today – 3.14. That must be why I'm acting so irrational. This is The Colbert Report."	March 14	3035
Colbert introduces a new segment, "When Ancestors Attack." Then he mentions how Colorado has made John Denver's "Rocky Mountain High" their second official song. Sport Report: advice on filling out March Madness brackets.
229	"None"	Ayaan Hirsi Ali	"Beware – Today's Ides of March alert level is at 'Orange.' This is The Colbert Report."	March 15	3036
Stephen celebrates the last St. Patrick's Day ever! Then he moves on to how Latin America has so many rabid admirers of President Bush, with comments from Esteban Colberto. In the 44th installment of Better Know A District, the guest was Phil Hare of Illinois's 17th congressional district.
230	"Pound Of Flesh"	Jerome Groopman	"Well, my bracket is shot. This is The Colbert Report."	March 19	3037
Stephen talks about the latest attack in DC, on him, by Rahm Emanuel. The Word refers to South Carolina proposing to allow prisoners to donate organs to reduce jail time. Threatdown: 5.Angry seniors, 4.Dancing seniors, 3.Time Magazine, 2.Fertility clinics, 1.the U.S. Food and Drug Administration. And the "Alpha Dog Of the Week" was awarded to Robert Hancock of Carterville, Illinois.
231	"Supernatural"	Willie Nelson, Richard Holbrooke	"Hey camels, stop showing off and drink something. This is The Colbert Report."	March 20	3038
While unveiling threat # .5 as an addendum to yesterday's threatdown, Colbert finds himself in agreement with a German environmentalist over the euthanasia of Knut, a polar bear cub at the Berlin zoo, until Colbert becomes suddenly enamored when viewing footage of the cub. Later, Colbert collects on a hockey bet with the mayor of Oshawa, Ontario, wherein this day would become "Stephen Colbert Day" in the town; the day was chosen to be the same day as the mayor's birthday. During the interview with Willie Nelson, Colbert summons US diplomat Richard Holbrooke to mediate, given Stephen's ire over Willie's competing Ben & Jerry's ice cream flavor. Later all three performed Willie's hit song "On the Road Again" with Bobby on rhythm guitar.
232	"Sex"	Benjamin Barber	"It's the first day of spring. Birds and bees, wait 'til you're married. This is The Colbert Report"	March 21	3039
In the 45th installment of Better Know A District, the guest was Maurice Hinchey from New York's 22nd congressional district.
233	"None"	Katie Couric	"America, your letter writing campaign was successful. The show's coming back tonight. This is The Colbert Report!"	March 22	3040
Debate over DC-residents voting bill with Congresswoman Eleanor Holmes Norton. Criticism over Chicago Sun-Times face reading expert Rose Rosetree's interpretation of Stephen's facial features. Phone conversation with Coach Bob Mancini of the Saginaw Spirit about the Ontario Hockey League playoffs.
234	"None"	Gwen Ifill, John Perry Barlow	"Warning: refreshing as it is, this show will not replace your electrolytes. This is The Colbert Report!"	March 26	3041
Stephen expressed his anger that a severed mummy hand was recently sold at auction, but not to him; the hand was the earliest example of we're No. #1. In response to Rahm Emanuel's practice of discouraging fellow congressional representatives to decline interviews with Stephen Colbert, Colbert played an interview of him conducted by PBS's Gwen Ifill rife with potential misinterpretations. He showed highlights from last week's "Stephen Colbert Day" in Oshawa, Ontario, including footage of a fight between team mascots and Canadians impersonating Stephen Colbert. During the interview with John Perry Barlow, Colbert created the catch phrase "Librarians are hiding something" in response to the discussion over the Electronic Frontier Foundation suit against Viacom, (Comedy Central's parent company) over the right to use parody despite a copyright.
235	"None"	Madeleine Albright, James Fallows	"Nation, you're like a family. That's why this year I'm claiming you all as dependents. This is The Colbert Report!"	March 27	3042
Stephen chided Sean Penn for his blunt criticism of the Bush administration. Colbert discusses Iran, specifically a clash over religion, with former US Secretary of State Madeleine Albright who took the opportunity to promote her new book The Mighty and the Almighty: Reflections on America, God, and World Affairs. On the feature 'Tip of the hat, wag of the finger' Colbert took a strong line against children doing methamphetamine, questioned the need for an all-gay cable channel and criticized scientists for creating a new breed of sheep.
236	"Monkey Business"	Jabari Asim	"This one's for the old blue, white and red — not necessarily in that order. This is The Colbert Report!"	March 28	3043
Stephen displayed his disappointment at the elimination of Paulina Porizkova from Dancing with the Stars, especially given that her husband Ric Ocasek is a friend of the show. Colbert discussed oil found in the Arctic Ocean near Russia, and an attempt to add Italy to the Axis of Evil led to an uncharacteristic breakdown. Later, Colbert discussed the N-word with author Jabari Asim, who wrote a book on the subject.
237	"Lemon-Raid"	Clive James	"If you're doing yoga, time to transition into the downward facing eagle. This is The Colbert Report."	March 29	3044
First, Colbert questioned the necessity of the Equal Rights Amendment, since everyone should be on the honor system. Later, Colbert cited the promulgation of John McCain that Sadr City is much safer than it was three months ago thanks to the military surge, despite the first-hand reports by Michael Ware that it is not safe for an American to leave the Green Zone. In response, Colbert suggested that Americans think of Iraq's capitol as Neverland. (Stephen noted that a mermaid said of Christiane Amanpour: "We were only trying to drown her," just as in Peter Pan.) Later, Colbert proclaimed the heroism of a dog which performed CPR on its owner. After the break, Colbert decided to create and submit cover photos to Harlequin Enterprises given their interest in replacing the staid images based on fantasy with more realistic men. Colbert volunteered the intern Meg to help him stage the photos.

=== April ===
No.	"The Wørd"	Guest(s)	Introductory phrase	Original release date	Prod. code
238	"None"	Colin Beavan and Katrina vanden Heuvel	"Christos Anestis! This is The Colbert Report!"	April 9	3045
Colbert celebrates the 4th anniversary of the liberation of Baghdad, while he eats his "Stephen Colbert's AmeriCone Dream" ice cream. He continues to eat it through the show. And announces that is now the number one flavor of Ben & Jerry's. He also runs an empty microwave in response to a family's attempt to live a "no environmental impact" lifestyle. Also in a fake radio show, Colbert insults Hungarians, reminiscent of the Don Imus scandal.
239	"Hip Replacement"	Jeannette Walls, András Simonyi	"Turn-offs: phony people. Turn-ons: people who watch my show … and sex. This is The Colbert Report."	April 10	3046
Stephen scolded the 15 British sailors whom after recently returning from captivity in Iran were seeking to publish accounts of their experience. In "The Wørd", he talked about America's bogus health care crisis. Colbert then changed the subject to an ethnic remark that he made against Hungarians on his fictional radio show, Colbert On the Ert (pronounced "air"), in which he described Hungarians as "those paprika-snorting ghoulies." Later, Colbert offered advice on the housing market in a "Bears & Balls" segment, with his big red sound effect button. During the interview with Jeannette Walls, she talks about her book about growing up homeless. Finally, Colbert was surprised to hear Hungarian Ambassador, András Simonyi on the set riffing on a bald eagle-embossed electric guitar.
240	"Season Pass"	Vali Nasr	"The Colbert promise: If you don't like this show, your money back. (Cable fees not included.) This is The Colbert Report."	April 11	3047
Stephen introduced the latest eponymic animal, Stephanie Colburtle, one of the leatherback sea turtles being tracked from Costa Rica to the Galápagos Islands. In "The Wørd", Colbert revisited Monday's story about the 15 British sailors; in response to a British colonel making the distinction between the soldiers' experiences and reality TV, Colbert devised the notion that perhaps Americans should "make the war a reality show" to achieve success in Iraq and to prepare for a future "spin-off in Iraq." In the Sport Report (pronounced "spore re-pore"), criminal activity of athletes and the Saginaw Spirit's end of the season were discussed. During the interview, Colbert admitted to Vali Nasr that he might consider admitting the Iraq war to be a mistake if it meant that he wouldn't have needed to learn the difference between Sunni and Shia Muslims.
241	"Body Armor"	Dr. Richard Land	"Welcome to the Monkey House. This is The Colbert Report."	April 12	3048
Stephen criticized Democratic senator Harry Reid for using "politicizing the war in Iraq" by citing a translation of a recent speech by Pope Benedict XVI. In "The Wørd," Colbert praised the president for proposing a new "war czar" position that would "chiefly be in command" of managing wars. Later aired a video describing Stephen's building manager Tad's quest to find a female companion for Stephen Jr., the eponymous bald eagle being tracked by GPS. Finally, Colbert challenged Richard Land to name one thing that conservatives have gotten wrong, specifically in regard to their invocation of God to justify political decisions.
242	"Clean Slate"	John Kerry	"Some parts of this episode are void in Alaska and Hawaii. This is The Colbert Report."	April 16	3049
Stephen begins by issuing a correction for having called Boyd K. Packer the "Mormon Pope" or "Mope," when he is more of a Mormon Cardinal, or "Mardinal." Colbert then compares Don Imus' firing with upcoming testimony of Alberto Gonzales before Congress regarding the U.S. Attorney firings scandal. In the second act, Colbert comments on Paulina Porizkova referring to Colbert as "so hot" in an interview and places a call to her home, but ends up leaving a voicemail claiming to be Dr. Stephen Hawking. And names Paul Wolfowitz his Alpha Dog of the Week, or in this case, Alpha Wolf of the Week for his role in the World Bank scandal.
243	"Plan B"	Elaine Pagels	"I'd never get a $400 haircut. I'd get $100 haircuts four times a week. This is The Colbert Report."	April 17	3050
Stephen announced that he will be having a metaphor-off with Sean Penn on Thursday's show. Update on Stephanie Colburtle the turtle who was in 2nd place at the time of broadcast on the race to the Galápagos Islands, by some logic "proving Darwin wrong." Short mention of Iraqi insurgents. On the section Tip of the hat, wag of the finger, Colbert responded to several stories (failure of abstinence-only sex education, cell phones interfering with the navigation of bees, "fake sperm" which "allow lesbians to have their own biological daughters," and a Japanese company recalling bidets which have been known to emit fire).
244	"Branding"	Paulina Porizkova	"If you're watching outside of your coverage area, this is a $10 co-pay. This is The Colbert Report."	April 18	3051
On Who's NOT honoring me now, Colbert complained that he was not being awarded a Pulitzer Prize in journalism. In "The Wørd," Colbert suggested the corporate sponsorship of the War on Terror since the "War on Terror is more than a name." Video showed promoting bovine growth hormones in dairy cows. In the interview, Colbert asked Paulina to state again that "Stephen is hot!" The two then discussed Paulina's supermodel status – Colbert certified her as a current supermodel since he is an "arbiter of American taste" — and the world of modeling in general.
245	"$400 Haircut"	Robert Pinsky, Sean Penn	"A dozen is 12. Bakers, learn how to count. This is The Colbert Report."	April 19	3052
Stephen balks at a scientific study saying that chimpanzees are more evolved than humans in DNA. On "The Wørd," he talks about John Edwards' $400 haircut and considers him going over to the Republican party. Colbert then interviews Sean Penn, and leads to a Meta-Free-Phor-All hosted by Pinsky (the decider of topics for the rounds used humorous pictures and sound effects in the style of The Daily Show's "God Machine," which Colbert usually took part in). Penn uses the "soiled and blood-soaked underwear" metaphor three times. The last round features an image of George W. Bush in said underwear, and Sean Penn wins 10 million points, much to the dismay of Stephen.
246	"None"	Mike Huckabee, Russell Simmons	"The weather's warmed up, and I'm showing some skin. This is The Colbert Report!"	April 23	3053
247	"Act Globally"	Dr. Andrew Weil	"Happy second anniversary, Pope Benedict! You'll always be Joseph Cardinal Ratzinger to me. This is The Colbert Report.	April 24	3054
The first act opens with a remembrance of Boris Yeltsin. Colbert continues with a combative interview with Eleanor Holmes Norton regarding a recent bill to give the District of Columbia a vote in the U.S. House of Representatives. In "The Wørd," Colbert comments on United States Environmental Protection Agency Administrator Stephen Johnson's announcement that the Bush Administration's anti-global warming efforts are delivering "real results". Colbert continues with news of Russia's new regulation that all broadcasts must be 50% good news. The "Alpha Dog of the Week," went to Uncle Ben's for "breaking through the Jemima ceiling". In the interview, Colbert speculates that Dr. Weil is Dr. Phil's alter ego without a beard.
248	"Sacrifice"	David Walker	"They found a new Earth-like planet, drive that Hummer all you want! This is The Colbert Report."	April 25	3055
Colbert decides that a new name is necessary for the long war, and comes up with Freemerican Victernity Made in China. He then backs the idea of having illegal immigrants fight in the armed services in exchange for citizenship. He points out his position on the cover of GQ, then complains about the Four Horsemen of the A-pop-calypse: movies, television, music, and books.
249	"Mending Wall"	Madeleine Bordallo, Tom Wolfe	"Happy National TV Turn-Off Week, you hypocrites! This is The Colbert Report."	April 26	3056
Stephen is unhappy at the fact that Stephanie Colburtle The Turtle did not win The Great Turtle Race, after being bested by another turtle named Billy. He claims Billy is a male, and demands a re-race. (After explaining that one can tell the sex of a turtle by the concavity of its plastron, Colbert says that he checks the plastron on "all [his] dates, and if it's not concave, [he is] outta there." However, a concave plastron denotes a male turtle.) On "The Wørd," he talks about the suggested walled-up neighborhoods of Baghdad, quoting from the military that these are but "gated communities" and tells how these areas can be put to good use, in terms of real estate. He continues his four-part series "Better know a Protectorate," with Guam, interviewing Delegate Madeleine Bordallo.
250	"None"	Neil deGrasse Tyson, Bill Bradley	"It's the last day of April. One more month 'till Speedo season! Do your squats. This is The Colbert Report."	April 30	3057

=== May ===
No.	"The Wørd"	Guest(s)	Introductory phrase	Original release date	Prod. code
251	"Who Cares?"	Malcolm Gladwell	"Tonight the part of Stephen Colbert will be played by, Stephen Col-Bert. The Management regrets any inconvenience. This is The Colbert Report."	May 1	3058
252	"Better Safe Than Sorry"	Mike Gravel, Gina Kolata	"Caution: Tonight's show may be a suffocation hazard, because you can't poke holes in my arguments. This is The Colbert Report."	May 2	3059
Colbert celebrates Bush's veto of the Iraq troop funding bill. He then argues that it's better to torture a few innocent people if it keeps terrorists from getting away. In the second segment, he interviews Mike Gravel about his statements during the recent Democratic presidential debate. Finally, he interviews Gina Kolata about her recent book on diets.
253	"The Unquisition"	Conn Iggulden	"I will now make a brief thirty minute statement followed by no questions. This is The Colbert Report."	May 3	3060
Colbert comments on the recent half clay, half grass tennis match between Roger Federer and Rafael Nadal, then places grass over half of his desk. He then commends atheists for organizing themselves in Europe, so they'll be easier to fight. In Better Know a District, Tom Davis, from Virginia's 11th congressional district is interviewed. Finally, Colbert chats with Conn Iggulden about his recent book stating that boys should be encouraged to take risks while growing up.
254	"The Intolerant"	Richard Preston	"Guests of The Colbert Report stay on the fabulous couches of their friends. This is The Colbert Report."	May 7	3061
Stephen sends a coded message to the recently elected conservative, pro-American, French President Nicolas Sarkozy. Then he comments on the liberal bias of the questions at last week's first debate of Republican Party presidential candidates. And on the segment "Cheating Death with Dr. Colbert T. Colbert, D.F.A.", his solution to health problems is to give people his "Vaxadrin". Also, Colbert defined the term Enviroporn as the having of sex in trees of enormous height. Enviroporn is executed without the aid of harnesses or other safety equipment, but instead a boat-like structure (which Richard Preston describes in his book The Wild Trees)
255	"Rendered Moot"	Nassim Nicholas Taleb	"Hey, Transformers: robots, or cars? We're at war, pick a side. This is The Colbert Report."	May 8	3062
Colbert gives a shout out to the USS Rhode Island. He then blasts Hillary Clinton's bill to revoke the Iraq War authorization. The second segment features a ThreatDown: 5. Oprah, 4. Publicists, 3. Austrians, 2. Spiders, 1. Knut, calling him the Justin Timberlake of godless killing machines. Finally, Colbert discusses Taleb's Black swan theory.
256	"None"	Salman Rushdie, Jane Fonda	"Clothes don't make the man, God does. Stop taking credit, my pants! This is The Colbert Report."	May 9	3063
Stephen tries to interview Jane Fonda, with her sitting on his lap the whole time.
257	"Illusion"	Jann Wenner	"This show is an acquired taste. If you don't like it, acquire some taste. This is The Colbert Report."	May 10	3064
Stephen makes a Korean R&B video after finishing 2nd in the Time 100 Most Influential People online poll to Korean pop star Rain. Colbert then names Naperville, Illinois his "Hometown Hero Town."
258	"Supporting Role"	William Langewiesche	"Happy belated Mother's Day! This is The Colbert Report."	May 14	3065
259	"Heated Debate"	Walter Isaacson	"This way lies madness, because I'm mad at a lot of things. This is The Colbert Report."	May 15	3066
260	"Level Playing Field"	Howard Dean	"Watch this show in a well ventilated area. My truth can be overpowering. This is The Colbert Report."	May 16	3067
261	"None"	Tom DeLay, Randy Kearse	"If you like The Colbert Report, then you'll love what's coming next. This is The Colbert Report."	May 17	3068
262	"His Way"	Jared Diamond	""I give you 360° of news, minus my 36° finder's fee. This is The Colbert Report"	May 21	3069
263	"Party of Change"	John Amaechi	"This show is taped before a live studio audience, as soon as someone removes that dead guy. (pointing to audience) This is The Colbert Report."	May 22	3070
Stephen calls Barack Obama a liar, for telling the truth about the false claims on him. ThreatDown Segment: No.4 was Michael Moore's upcoming movie "Sicko" for attempting to bring socialized medicine to the U.S. And No.1 was environmentalists for trying to establish trust funds for grey wolves and bears.
264	"None"	Bay Buchanan, Bob Deans	"Congratulations, person who won American Idol, I knew it. This is The Colbert Report."	May 23	3071
Colbert brags that the Democrats cut and run on the Iraq War Funding Bill, by playing the Burl Ives song, "Frog Went A-Courting". He also reports on Lou Dobbs' comment, that Mexican immigrants have leprosy. Mini-ThreatDown: Anthony Pellicano, former P.I. to the stars, which causes Colbert to play voice messages from 1999, about taking Jon Stewart out.
265	"None"	Jimmy Wales	"I report, I decide. This is The Colbert Report."	May 24	3072
Better Know A District, Raúl Grijalva from Arizona's 7th congressional district.

=== June ===
No.	"The Wørd"	Guest(s)	Introductory phrase	Original release date	Prod. code
266	"None"	Jan Schakowsky, Leon Botstein	"Loch Ness Monster, come on my show or you're nothing but a myth. This is The Colbert Report."	June 4	3073
267	"Mission Control"	Jessica Valenti	"To me, every day is the Fourth of July. Which is why so many of my checks get returned. This is The Colbert Report."	June 5	3074
Stephen mocks The New York Times for its article the previous day, "Romney Political Fortunes Tied to Riches He Gained in Business." Next he calls Scooter Libby's prison sentence "ludicrous" and gives his advice to Libby about how to handle prison life. Colbert then mentions his feud with Koren pop sensation Rain and responds to some South Korean press articles about his own previously-aired Korean pop music video. In "The Wørd" he discusses NASA Administrator Michael D. Griffin's recent appearance on NPR. He complains about how the New York Times says people are calling the iPhone "the God machine." Colbert then displays The God Machine he used on The Daily Show. In the segment "When Animals Attack Our Morals" he talks about a pair of male flamingos at an England Zoo that adopted an abandoned chick. Finally he interviews Jessica Valenti about her book, Full Frontal Feminism.
268	"Airogance"	Carl Bernstein	"It's the 63rd anniversary of D-Day. Still waiting for that thank you note, France. This is The Colbert Report"	June 6	3075
Stephen talks about how the Republican candidates running in the 2008 Presidential election bashed Bush in their third debate. Then he shows some footage from The Situation Room when Soledad O'Brien interviewed the leading Democratic candidates about their faith. Colbert remarks that "asking Democrats about their religion is like asking Mel Gibson how he enjoyed his Passover." Next Colbert goes to "The Wørd", which is a continuation of last night's discussion about NASA Administrator Michael D. Griffin's recent appearance on NPR. In "Tip of the Hat, Wag of the Finger" Colbert wags his finger at Fox News for discussing Vladimir Putin's threat to aim missiles at Europe because of President Bush's plan to build missile defense shields there. Colbert tips his hat to Prospero's Books for burning books in protest for how Americans no longer have respect for the printed word. He also tips his hat to Genosis, Inc. for inventing an at-home male fertility test and uses the opportunity to plug his "Stephen Colbert's Formula 401" fertility product. Colbert wags his finger at guitar players, specifically those who gathered to play "Smoke on the Water" in Kansas City. He claims that his flight was delayed, and he missed out on the celebration. Colbert goes to commercial playing the song on his own guitar. Next Colbert interviews Carl Bernstein about his book on Hillary Clinton, A Woman in Charge. After the interview, Colbert talks about an octopus that has learned to open bottles with its tentacles in his segment "The Craziest F#?king Thing I've Ever Heard."
269	"Rodham"	Cullen Murphy	"How many times do I have to tell you 'This is The Colbert Report'? One more? Fine! This is The Colbert Report."	June 7	3076
270	"Easy A"	Michael D. Gershon	"Hey, Tony Awards, you forgot this performance: (waving his hands) This is The Colbert Report."	June 11	3077
271	"None"	Josh Wolf	"Lights, Camera, Anger! This is The Colbert Report."	June 12	3078
272	"Pathophysiology"	Ron Paul	"Good News! I just saved money on my car insurance by switching to no car insurance! This is The Colbert Report."	June 13	3079
Talked about the Don't Ask, Don't Tell policy, and spoke about a report called "Psychophysiology of Male Homosexuality" by James W. Holsinger, who has been nominated by President George W. Bush to become Surgeon General, that deemed homosexuality as "unnatural". The ThreatDown featured a flip-flop style: 5. Robots!, 4. Bears!, 3. Robots!, 2. Bears!, and 1. Robot Bears!
273	"None"	Daniel Smith	"Hey Carly Simon! Thanks for writing that song about me! This is The Colbert Report."	June 14	3080
Again spoke about the US Military's Don't Ask, Don't Tell policy, and spoke with Stephen Benjamin, a translator who was kicked from the military for being gay. In the second part, Colbert debuted the "Summer Special Addition" of Bears and Balls, which featured ways to save money on summer vacations. Colbert spoke briefly on the economy in Zimbabwe, mentioning the massive inflation in Zimbabwe and commenting that USD$1 equals ZWD$50,000,000. He also spoke about ivory, saying that several African countries want to start to collect and trade it again.
274	"McConaughey"	Toby Keith	"I had a great Father's Day with all my kids...that I know of. This is The Colbert Report."	June 18	3081
Stephen comments on Bob Barker's final appearance as host of The Price Is Right. He then talks about People Magazine naming Matthew McConaughey their sexiest bachelor. Colbert briefly speaks about his music column on iTunes. In the "Tip Of The Hat, Wag Of The Finger" segment, Colbert applauds Arnold Schwarzenegger and Republicans. Finally, Colbert interviews Toby Keith, who also performs.
275	"None"	Anne-Marie Slaughter	"Hey oscillating fans! Left or right? Pick a side! We're at war! This is The Colbert Report!"	June 19	3082
Stephen comments on the secret Eric Clapton concert to be held for charity. He then talks about his eagle "son," Colbert Jr, and that bald eagles are about to come off of the Endangered Species list. Colbert then talks with MaryBeth Garrigan (and her eagle, Harriet) about National Eagle Day, to be held on June 20. He spoke about Isaac Newton's prediction on when the world will end. Colbert names Robert Bork the "Alpha Dog Of The Week." Finally, Colbert interviews Anne-Marie Slaughter about America's values.
276	"Justice/Just-ish"	Will Schwalbe	"Hey, America! I got shotgun! Not the seat, the gun. This is The Colbert Report."	June 20	3083
Stephen talks about Michael Bloomberg, mayor of New York City, leaving the Republican Party. He then complains about a court ruling that prohibits the United States from indefinitely detaining civilians, even if they are designated "enemy combatants." In the "Cheating Death with Dr. Colbert T. Colbert, DFA" segment, Colbert talks about nutrition, oral hygiene and weight loss. Stephen's solutions for each issue are, respectively, Vaxa-Smacks, Vaxa-Dream and Vaxadril. Finally, Colbert talks with Will Schwalbe about e-mail and how to use it in a better way.
277	"Porking"	Vincent Bugliosi	"It's International Surf Day. Shaka bra! (Hawaiian expression meaning 'hang loose.') This is The Colbert Report."	June 21	3084
Stephen talks about the "Colbert Bump," in regards to Ron Paul's recent appearance on the show and subsequent bump in the polls. He then complains about condoms being advertised on television. Colbert re-ran a segment from last year featuring the Minuteman Project. He then speaks with Vincent Bugliosi about the John F. Kennedy assassination. Finally, Colbert gives a short tribute to Don Herbert, aka "Mr. Wizard," who died the previous week.
278	"Fourth Branch"	Tom Hayden	"If you're sitting within three feet of your TV, careful! You're in the 'splash zone.' This is The Colbert Report."	June 25	3085
Stephen complains about dumpster diving and to prevent it, he says to horde your trash. He comments on Vice President Dick Cheney asserting that he is not part of the Executive Branch. The special "tropical-themed" Threatdown: 5. Sand! 4. Japan! 3. Octopi! 2. Coral reefs! 1. Dolphins! Finally, Colbert interviews Tom Hayden about the Iraq War.
279	"Elsewhere"	David France	"You've heard of truth in advertising? This is truth with advertising. This is The Colbert Report."	June 26	3086
Stephen rings in the yuletide season early. He comments on Tony Blair possibly converting to Roman Catholicism, as well as the possibility of the Bush Administration closing Guantanamo Bay. He makes a brief comment on the border fence between the United States and Mexico. Colbert names Fred Thompson the "Alpha Dog Of The Week." Finally, Colbert interviews David France about the potential link between genetics and homosexuality.
280	"None"	Tom Blanton, Daniel Gilbert	"Being me is a full-time job and I've never missed a day. This is The Colbert Report."	June 27	3087
Stephen complains that USA Today, The New York Times and The Wall Street Journal got an iPhone before he did. He then speaks with Tom Blanton about recently released secret CIA documents. In "The Four Horsemen of the A-Pop-Calypse" segment, Colbert discusses Shaquille O'Neal's reality show, Sinéad O'Connor's comeback album, Harry Potter and the Deathly Hallows and the Transformers movie. Finally, Colbert interviews Daniel Gilbert about the meaning of happiness.
281	"Profiles In Timing"	Doug Bailey	"Just six days until my 4th of July fireworks display and just eight days until they're able to put it out. This is The Colbert Report."	June 28	3088
Stephen plays "spot the difference" between two pictures of 10 Downing Street. Next, he talks about Iran rationing fuel to its citizens and compares it to the 1979 energy crisis in the United States. Then, Colbert expresses his happiness that Richard Lugar thinks that President Bush's strategy in Iraq isn't working. In the "Colbert Platinum" segment, Colbert discusses the increasing number of luxury vehicles that are in car accidents, The Vatican's recent "10 Commandments of Driving," and the Montblanc "Mystery Masterpiece" pen that is encrusted in diamonds and sells for $700,000. Finally, Colbert interviews Doug Bailey about Unity08.

=== July ===
No.	"The Wørd"	Guest(s)	Introductory phrase	Original release date	Prod. code
282	"None"	Ben Nelson, Richard Florida	"Did you miss me? I know. I missed me too. This is The Colbert Report."	July 16	3089
Colbert discusses the Scooter Libby trial, mentioning that he attempted to dig a tunnel to prison to free Libby. Colbert then mentions that Pope Benedict XVI issued a proclamation stating that other churches are either defective or are not true churches. Colbert then discusses a study that found that living next to homosexuals increase property values. Colbert interviews Richard Florida, author of Rise of the Creative Class, and leader of the study. Colbert then talks about Feminism and women's rights, including a video featuring pole dancers and the Difference Maker of the week, Johnna Mink. Finally, Colbert interviews Senator Ben Nelson, discussing the Iraq War.
283	"Victimcrite"	Mark Moffett	"Well, well, well, we meet again. Only this time, it is I who have my own television show. This is The Colbert Report."	July 17	3090
Colbert talks about the ongoing debate in the Senate about creating a timetable for withdrawing from Iraq. Colbert then expresses his goal of making his show 24 hours long. Colbert then speaks about the David Vitter Prostitution Scandal involving Deborah Jeane Palfrey. In the Tip of the Hat, Wag of the Finger segment, Colbert tips his hat to Secretary of Defense Robert Gates, and wags his finger to IHOP and Japan. Colbert interviews Mark Moffett about ants and their behavior. Finally, in solidarity with the Republicans about the all-night Senate debate, Colbert announces he will do the show for 24 hours. He then begins a 500-count Threatdown and gets to Threat No. 499, "Past Love Regrets"
284	""	John Mellencamp	"(continuing from where we left off with an unkempt-looking Stephen apparently still doing ThreatDown at Threat #499, throwing an empty energy drink can down after drinking it) Okay, so we're lined up after recess, and there she is, Deborah Downing: girl I had a crush on since kindergarten. She says to me 'do you like kickball?', and I love kickball, it was my favorite thing in the world! Hell, I was holding a kickball! But do I say I like kickball? No, I look at her and say 'I don't know'. (starts to sob and tries to hold back tears) She walks away! Okay, who's up next? Preschool: Abby McPherson- (egg timer dings) Ha-ha! Ah, there! (hits the egg timer) I broadcast my show for 24 hours straight in solidarity with Republicans during their forced overnight debate in the Senate, and it is over! Woo, I did it! Also, that means (gets out a pot from below his desk) my 24-hour egg is ready. I do hate a runny yolk. This is (starts to sob again) The Colbert Report!"	July 18	3091
Stephen picks up where he left off last night, Threat No. 499 on the Threatdown, "Past Love Regrets." Colbert again comments on the previous night's all-night debate in the Senate, and how he "did the show" for 24 hours to show solidarity with the Republicans. He then thanks the Bush Administration and the media for re-frightening him about Al-Qaeda. Colbert then complains about Vatican City being the first sovereign state in the world to go carbon neutral. Next, he names David Beckham the "Alpha Dog Of The Week." Finally, Colbert interviews John Mellencamp, who also performs his song "Our Country."
285	"None"	Michael Moore, Frank Sulloway	"Bless you! I assumed somebody sneezed... This is The Colbert Report."	July 19	3092
Stephen reports on John McCain's recent presidential campaign woes. He briefly comments on former Virginia governor Jim Gilmore's withdrawal of his candidacy for President of the United States. He then talks about the recent spat between Michael Moore and CNN's Dr. Sanjay Gupta about alleged inaccuracies in Moore's film Sicko. Colbert then interviews Moore. Next, he introduces a new segment, "The March To Enslavement," in which he worries about $100 laptops and Apple's new iPhone. The crawls at the bottom of the segment are attempts to spell "$100 LAPTOPS" and "APPLE" respectively in binary, though the first crawl isn't complete. Finally, Colbert interviews Frank Sulloway about the possible link between birth order, I.Q., and radicalism
286	"Premium Package"	Simon Schama	(Intently reading Harry Potter and the Deathly Hallows through the usual opening introduction. Cuts away and pans over the entire audience reading Harry Potter and the Deathly Hallows.) "Wha — ? Oh, this is The Colbert Report..."	July 23	3093
Stephen discusses Senator Ben Nelson's July 16 appearance on the show. Nelson apparently dyed his hair for the interview, but Colbert claimed that his interview area is a Fountain of Youth. Next, Colbert gets enraged about welfare queens. Then, Colbert makes a brief comment about the Dow Jones Industrial Average hitting 14,000 for the first time in history. In the "Colbert Platinum" segment, Colbert discusses luxury submarines, polo ponies being stricken with herpes, and Indian billionaire Mukesh Ambani building the world's first billion dollar private home. Finally, Colbert interviews Simon Schama about the benefits of art.
287	"Modest Porpoisal"	Anthony Romero	"Congratulations, Drew Carey. CBS, remember to spay and neuter your host. This is The Colbert Report."	July 24	3094
Stephen briefly talks about President Bush temporarily transferring presidential powers to Vice President Cheney while he underwent a colonoscopy, as well as the minimum wage increase that went into effect today. Next, he talks about endangered species going extinct. In the "Movies That Are Destroying America" segment, he rails against 10,000 B.C., Bratz, I Now Pronounce You Chuck and Larry and Hairspray. Colbert interviews Anthony Romero about the ACLU. Finally, Colbert pleads to become a member of the Illuminati.
288	"No Regrets"	Charles Kaiser	"If I've said it once, I've said it 287 times. This is The Colbert Report."	July 25	3095
Stephen discusses a recent study that said Fox News spent less time covering the Iraq War than either CNN or MSNBC, but Bill O'Reilly spent quite a bit of time covering reader's comments on the Daily Kos website, while Sean Hannity covered the 1993 death of Vince Foster. He then talks about a new tattoo ink that is easy to remove. Next, he briefly talks about Fred Thompson's recent shake-up of his presidential campaign staff. In the "Hometown Hero Town" segment, Colbert honors Bryce Canyon City, Utah. Finally, Colbert interviews Charles Kaiser about the contributions to society by homosexuals. Colbert then "blows the audiences minds" by not doing a traditional "Good Night" segment.
289	"None"	Aaron Houston, Bob Shrum	"Hey, semicolon! Comma or colon? Pick a side, we're at war. This is The Colbert Report."	July 26	3096
Stephen apparently broke his left wrist last night and tries to figure out how it happened. He realizes it was when he tripped and fell during yesterday's pre-show warm-up. He then talks about residents of North Dakota's attempt to legalize hemp and speaks with Aaron Houston about his efforts to get marijuana legalized. Next, he complains about one of Nepal's Kumaris being stripped of her goddess status because she visited the United States. This segues into the "Advice To The Gods" segment. Finally, Colbert interviews Bob Shrum about his role as adviser to various Democratic Party presidential candidates.
290	"Solidarity"	Evan Osnos	"If you can't stand the heat, air condition your kitchen. This is The Colbert Report."	July 30	3097
Stephen again talks about his broken wrist and displays the flowers that were sent to him. He then discusses a recent article in The Wall Street Journal that says dust plumes from China are causing air pollution in the United States. He then complains that labor unions are destroying America. The Threatdown: 5. Weak American Bellies! 4. The Bankrupt! 3. Party Poopers! 2. Scottish Surgeons! 1. Badgers! Finally, Colbert interviews Evan Osnos about the effect of China's cashmere farms on the environment.
291	"Special Prosecutor"	Kathleen Kennedy Townsend	"Mi casa es su casa. "Casa" means "anger," right? This is The Colbert Report."	July 31	3098
Colbert continues to attack Hollywood films that show "wrist violence" and calls on Hollywood to stop showing such acts. He introduces a new segment, "Arc! Who Goes There?," also known as, "Smokin' Pole – The Fight for Arctic Riches", where he talks about Russia's recent claim that the North Pole and its natural resources belong to them. Colbert calls for America to fight back, fearing that if the Russians control the North Pole, they will control Christmas. He briefly congratulates Rupert Murdoch's takeover of The Wall Street Journal, although he wonders if he has instead taken over Reuters, who were first to report the story. Colbert then interviews Kathleen Kennedy Townsend about religion and politics.

=== August ===
No.	"The Wørd"	Guest(s)	Introductory phrase	Original release date	Prod. code
292	"College Credit"	Michael Beschloss	"Hot enough for you? Yes I am. This is The Colbert Report."	August 1	3099
Stephen continues to talk about wrist violence, and creates a new segment of the show, "Wrist Watch." Colbert is visited by Dr. Jerald Vizzone, his orthopedic surgeon, and tells Colbert he will be fine. On "The Wørd," Colbert announces his idea for arranging all fields of knowledge into a three-tier pricing system – "Marketable" (Business, Engineering, Science), "Non-marketable" (History) and "You know this is killing your parents" (Classics, Comparative literature, Linguistics). He argues that universities should apply monetary values to facts. In the "When Animals Attack Our Morals" segment, he attacks pigeons that been given a birth control pill, a cat, named Oscar, that curls up to a patient who then seems to die after around 4 hours, and a seagull that stole Doritos. Colbert then interviews Michael Beschloss about the presidential courage.
293	"None"	John R. MacArthur, Michael Behe	"Selected members of our studio audience tonight will be receiving chairs. This is The Colbert Report."	August 2	3100
Stephen is appalled by the Bush administration's alleged plan to build a NAFTA superhighway across the United States. He's then joined by John R. MacArthur to discuss the rumor. Next, he talks about the Defense Department sending troops in Fallujah an aid package containing ThighMasters. In the "Mini Sport Report," Colbert briefly discusses Alex Rodriguez's pursuit of 500 home runs and Barry Bonds' quest to break Hank Aaron's all-time home run record. Colbert then interviews Michael Behe about intelligent design. Finally, Colbert pays tribute to Ingmar Bergman, who died on July 30.
294	"The Dark Side"	Ian Bogost	"Here's America's fortune: (opening a fortune cookie). This is The Colbert Report... in bed."	August 7	3101
Stephen compares the YearlyKos Convention to the Nazis, calling them fascists. In "The Wørd," he talks about how we need to break the law to fight terrorism. In "Better Know A Protectorate", he talks to Representative Eni Fa'aua'a Hunkin Faleomavaega, Jr., and tries to make him argue for nuclear testing in American Samoa. He then interviews Ian Bogost about how computers act as an expressive medium. He ends with a new segment, "Colbert Commonsensicals," which features an inspirational message. It is, "Always use a mirror when you're shaving, or you might miss a spot."
295	"None"	Jim Cramer, Tina Brown	"This show is gonna knock your socks off and I am not responsible for their replacement value. This is The Colbert Report."	August 8	3102
Stephen again comments on his broken left wrist and the agony it's causing him. In the "Wrist Watch" segment, he talks about Lance Armstrong's Livestrong wristband and introduces his own product, the Wriststrong bracelet. He then discusses the fluctuating stock market and interviews Jim Cramer. In the "Bears & Balls" segment, Colbert talks about the 2008 Summer Olympics, bootlegged Harry Potter books, and Barry Bonds breaking the Major League Baseball all-time home run record. Finally, Colbert interviews Tina Brown about her book on Princess Diana, The Diana Chronicles.
296	"Clarity (Second Use)"	Judd Apatow	"That tingling sensation means the truth is working. This is The Colbert Report."	August 9	3103
Stephen starts off by mentioning his Wriststrong bracelet. He gave Katie Couric one and she promised to wear it on her July 7 newscast, but much to Steven's chagrin, she didn't. He then talks about Rudy Giuliani's statement that in four Democratic presidential debates, no Democrat used the term "Islamic terrorism." In the "Tip of the Hat, Wag of the Finger" segment, Colbert wags his finger at Michael Bloomberg, tips his hat to The New York Times and Esquire, and wags his finger at Hurricane Katrina refugees. Finally, Colbert interviews Judd Apatow about his films, including the upcoming Superbad.
297	"White Guy"	Michael F. Jacobson	(we see Stephen unable to find camera and pills due to prescription painkiller withdrawal) Tonight- Which is my camera? Where are- where's my ca- which is- where are my pills? Which is my camera, and where are my pills?! Do we have to do this right now?! This is The Colbert Report."	August 13	3104
Stephen begins by saying that he has run out of the drugs he has been using to help with his wrist, and is therefore suffering from hallucinations. He then talks about Karl Rove's resignation, claiming this was an hallucination. In "The Wørd," Colbert believes that John Edwards should declare himself a black woman to increase his chances of winning the election. He then presents an all-animal "Threatdown": 5. Bats! 4. Monkeys! 3. Karl Rove! 2. Marmosets! 1. Bears! Finally, Colbert interviews Michael Jacobson about nutrition.
298	"None"	Jerry Miller, Spencer Wells	None	August 14	3105
Stephen talks about his favorite product, Stephen Colbert's Formula 401, and his sadness that a tanker filled with it jackknifed on the highway. He then presents a special repor-t, "DNA – Could It Happen To You?" He begins with an educational film on DNA. Colbert then attacks the Innocence Project, claiming it puts the whole criminal justice system into doubt, and interviews Jerry Miller. Finally, Colbert interviews Spencer Wells about the Genographic Project and they trace Stephen's DNA.
299	"Potential"	Markos Moulitsas, Michael Wallis	"If anyone asks where I was between 11:30 and 12, I was right here. This is The Colbert Report."	August 15	3106
From the previous episode, Colbert again mentions the possibility that his ancestors were Jewish. He then discusses perceived inflammatory speech on the Daily Kos website and interviews the website's founder, Markos Moulitsas. In the "Monkey on the Lam" segment, Colbert talks about a capuchin monkey that picked the lock on his cage door at a zoo in Tupelo, Mississippi, for the second time in two weeks. He then discusses Attorney General Alberto Gonzales' failure to meet his potential. Finally, Colbert interviews Michael Wallis about the Lincoln Highway.
300	"None"	Mike Huckabee, Andrew Keen	"Happy 300th show, me! Keep up the good work, me! This is The Colbert Report."	August 16	3107
Stephen begins by asking people not to watch his interview with Richard Branson on August 22, which has been reported in the media as a "trainwreck." Colbert then interviews Mike Huckabee, claiming that he came second in the Iowa Straw Poll due to his appearances on The Colbert Report, and what Colbert claims is the "Colbert Bump." In the "Cheating Death with Dr. Colbert T. Colbert, DFA" segment, he talks about genetics, continuing from Tuesday's DNA special repor-t. Finally, Colbert interviews Andrew Keen on the Internet's effect on culture.
301	"Made in Iraq"	Nathan Sawaya	"I'm offering back-to-school savings. Save yourself the pain and don't go back to school. This is The Colbert Report."	August 20	3108
Stephen continues to attack wrist violence, and says the worst offender in "wrist snuff" is Steven Seagal. He also announces that his "Wriststrong" bracelets are now available from colbertnation.com, and all proceeds go to help the Yellow Ribbon Fund. Colbert introduces a new segment, "Nailed 'Em," focusing on successful stories in the criminal justice system. In "The Wørd," he suggests that most American products should be made in Iraq. He interviews Nathan Sawaya about his art, which he makes out of Lego.
302	"Self-Determination"	Michael Shermer	"Is it still raining? I hadn't noticed. This is The Colbert Report."	August 21	3109
Stephen starts with the "Smokin' Pole: The Fight for Arctic Riches" segment, where he attacks Canada's claim to the Northwest Passage through the Arctic, claiming it belongs to the United States. In "The Wørd," Colbert attacks WikiScanner claiming it prevents corporations from editing their own entries, and describes Wikipedia as, "Second Life for corporations". In the "Formidable Opponent" segment, Colbert debates himself on different ways people could conduct terrorist attacks. Finally, he interviews Michael Shermer about skepticism.
303	"November Surprise"	Richard Branson	"'Your phone is ringing. Your phone is ringing.' Free ringtone. This is The Colbert Report."	August 22	3110
Stephen begins the show wearing an airliner pilot's uniform. He talks about the "Colbert-Branson Interview Trainwreck" and that an airliner owned by Virgin America has been named the "Air Colbert." In "The Wørd," Colbert talks about Fred Thompson not formally declaring himself as a candidate for the election. He then discusses Brian Williams failing to give his Wriststrong bracelet to someone more famous, i.e. Matt Lauer, and creates a new segment, "Where In The World Is Matt Lauer's Wriststrong Bracelet?" In the "Colbert Platinum" segment, he talks about the shutting down of a helipad in Saint-Tropez and the growing demand for champagne. Finally, he interviews Richard Branson about Virgin America and "Air Colbert." At the end of the interview, Branson throws water on Stephen, who then retaliates.
304	"None"	Thomas E. Ricks	"And after tonight, I'm off for two weeks. (Whispers) But don't tell my staff. (Normally) This is The Colbert Report."	August 23	3111
Stephen reviews the Iraq War and Dick Cheney's role in advocating it. He then interviews Thomas E. Ricks about the war. Colbert then talks about his broken wrist and shows a documentary film entitled Fractured Freedom: The Colbert Colbert Story. He announces that several people had signed his cast, including Nancy Pelosi, Tim Russert, Tony Snow, Brian Williams, Bill O'Reilly and Michael Bloomberg. He then announces he will auction off his cast on eBay for the Yellow Ribbon Fund. Finally, Stephen's doctor, Dr. Jerald Vizzone, removes the cast.

=== September ===
No.	"The Wørd"	Guest(s)	Introductory phrase	Original release date	Prod. code
305	"Honor-Bound"	Bjørn Lomborg	"It's okay to wear white after Labor Day as long as it's between red and blue. This is The Colbert Report."	September 10	3112
Stephen gives a summary of events that has occurred during his break. He has been in rehab, and after a court order, he announced he is over his painkiller addiction, although he was beaten up by Amy Winehouse. In "The Wørd," he claims the best way to discuss the issue of leaving Iraq is to use the word "honor." Colbert then announces his cast sold for $17,200 and shows a montage of celebrities signing it. Finally, Colbert interviews Bjørn Lomborg on climate change. The word that appears next to Colbert in the opening credits changes from "GOOD" to "GUTLY."
306	"Southsourcing"	Katie Bruggeman, Garrison Keillor	(While gesturing) "This is the church, this is the steeple. Open the doors, get in there, you Atheists! This is The Colbert Report."	September 11	3113
Stephen talks about Fred Thompson, and announces the start of his coverage of Indecision 2008: Don't F%#k This Up America and tells the people how not to "F%#k up" the election. In "The Wørd," he talks about his support of American businesses moving to Mexico for cheap labor, and selling the products back in America. Colbert then interviews his executive assistant Katie Bruggeman, who claims to be the preschool girlfriend of Sgt. Dave Karsnia, who arrested Larry Craig. He then interviews Garrison Keillor about his book Pontoon.
307	"Re-run"	Joel Klein	"Have you ever looked at a cloud and thought it looked like something else? Then stop smoking dope. This is The Colbert Report."	September 12	3114
The "Atone Phone" for Jews who have wronged Colbert is reintroduced. In "The Wørd," Colbert says it is a good idea for MSNBC to play footage of their 9/11 coverage, and they should present re-runs of all their old news programs, so that when President Bush leaves office, people will remember him as a hero. A new Tek Jansen episode is broadcast. Colbert interviews Joel Klein about paying students who get good grades. After the interview, Klein phones Stephen, saying he cheated on his interview.
308	"None"	Father James Martin, Ed Begley, Jr., Viggo Mortensen	"The opinions expressed in this broadcast do not reflect those of Comedy Central, MTV Networks, or the Viacom Corporation...because they're all cowards. This is The Colbert Report."	September 13	3115
Stephen first talks about Mother Teresa questioning the existence of God, thus claiming the Mother Teresa was not a good person. He then interviews Jesuit priest Father James Martin on the subject. Colbert then talks about Wriststrong. He claims he has sold 19,000 bracelets. He also announces he passed a bracelet to Bill O'Reilly. This brings back the segment Where in the World is Matt Lauer's Wriststrong Bracelet?, where Matt Lauer is now wearing his bracelet. As Lauer was in Iran at the time of the broadcast, Colbert suggests Lauer should give his bracelet to Mahmoud Ahmadinejad. He then interviews Ed Begley, Jr. about the environment. Colbert mentions people wanting him to run for President, and says he would do so if there were a sign. Viggo Mortensen appears suddenly to give a sword to his 'lord' Stephen, who comments that it would be a great letter opener.
309	"Let My People Go"	Barry Manilow, Susan Sarandon	"I have had it up to here (points to chin)...also down to there (points to forehead), but in between...I'm good. This is The Colbert Report."	September 18	3116
Stephen begins by discussing the "Atone Phone" and his loss to Tony Bennett at the Emmy Awards. Barry Manilow appears as Stephen's conscience to help him get over the loss. Colbert then discusses California possibly eliminating the "winner take all" aspect of the Electoral College. In the "Difference Makers" segment, Ed Werbany, Jr. of Hilltop, New Jersey is profiled for putting a patriotic statue in front of his business. Finally, Colbert interviews Susan Sarandon about her new film, In the Valley of Elah, as well as her political beliefs.
310	"Solitarity"	Naomi Wolf	"Sorry, egg fans, it's the chicken. End of argument. This is The Colbert Report."	September 19	3117
Stephen again begins by discussing the "Atone Phone" and complains that Ed Asner has yet to call and apologize for disrespecting his Wriststrong bracelet. Asner then calls and chastises Stephen. Next, Colbert talks about the recent incident in which a University of Florida student was tasered by campus police at a John Kerry speech. In the "eco-conscious" edition of "Colbert Platinum," he discusses yachts that are equipped to collect environmental data for study, Clayoquot Wilderness Resort in British Columbia, and Louis Vuitton's "Tribute Patchwork" bag. Finally, Colbert interviews Naomi Wolf about her belief that the United States is heading toward fascism.
311	"Market Forces"	Jeffrey Toobin	"Hey, Reading Rainbow! Stop promoting the homo-literate agenda. This is The Colbert Report."	September 20	3118
Once again, Colbert opens by discussing the "Atone Phone" and plays a message left by a rabbi in Connecticut. He then briefly references the University of Florida student being tasered. Next, he talks about Blackwater USA's license to operate in Iraq being revoked. In the "Threatdown:" 5. Salad! 4. Slavic Intercourse! 3. El Chupacabra! 2. The Bingham Company! 1. Us! Colbert then interviews Jeffrey Toobin about the U.S. Supreme Court. Finally, in "The Craziest F#?king Thing I've Ever Heard" segment, Colbert mentions a restaurant in Tokyo, Japan that features mayonnaise on everything.
312	"Na Na-Na Na Na Na"	Thomas Friedman	"One small step for me, one giant leap for mekind. This is The Colbert Report."	September 24	3119
Stephen begins by talking about Mahmoud Ahmadinejad's visit to the United States. Next, he claims that the most important thing America can do is improve the morale of its troops, or rather one troop, General Petraeus. In the "Alpha Dog of the Week" segment, Colbert talks about a man who was found not guilty of indecent exposure while building bookshelves in the nude. He then talks about his dislike of the metric system. He then interviews Thomas Friedman about foreign affairs and insourcing. Finally, Colbert announces that over 40,000 Jews called the "Atone Phone" and plays some of the messages.
313	"None"	K. David Harrison, John Grisham	"It's the thought that counts and so far...I'm up to zero. This is The Colbert Report."	September 25	3120
Stephen begrudgingly praises The New York Times for giving MoveOn.org a discount for their full-page "General Betray Us" advertisement. He then discusses a study that claims half of the world's languages are in danger of going extinct and interviews David Harrison on the subject. Next, Indecision 2008: Don't F%#k This Up America focuses on Rudy Giuliani's recent trip to England. In the "Tip of the Hat, Wag of the Finger" segment, Colbert tips his hat to Muslim hipsters, Palm Beach County, Florida, and the Food and Drug Administration. Finally, Colbert interviews John Grisham about his new book.
314	"A Word From Our Sponsors"	Sam Waterston, Tony Bennett	"I'm living high on the hog, and let me tell you, hogs make a terrible foundation. This is The Colbert Report."	September 26	3121
Stephen begins by commenting on his Emmy Award loss to Tony Bennett and their mutual love of Target. He then discusses the Canadian dollar being worth more than the United States dollar. Colbert then comments on iTunes not including commercials in the various television shows they sell. Next, Colbert interviews Sam Waterston about Unity08. Finally, he interviews Tony Bennett, who then performs "They All Laughed" with Stephen.
315	"Early Immunization"	David Schwartz	"The answer to tonight's sudoku is 123456789, not necessarily in that order. This is The Colbert Report."	September 27	3122
Stephen first talks about Tutankhamun and the debate about whether he is black or white. He then talks about the Democratic Party's recent debate on MSNBC. In "The Wørd," he discusses the best way to improve the health care of children. In the "Wrist Watch" segment, Colbert announces Wriststrong bracelets are now being worn by Neil Cavuto, Larry King, Adrian Grenier, Seth Rogen and Bill Clinton. Next, Colbert interviews David Schwartz about campaign advertisements. Finally, Colbert finishes the show with a presidential advertisement from 1984 for Ronald Reagan.

=== October ===
No.	"The Wørd"	Guest(s)	Introductory phrase	Original release date	Prod. code
316	"Evitable"	Charlie Savage	"New York Mets, congratulations on your record-setting season. This is The Colbert Report."	October 1	3123
Stephen expresses his concern about Dennis Kucinich and the things he carries in his pockets. He then discusses a recent Senate amendment calling for President Bush to call Iran's Revolutionary Guard a terrorist organization. In the "Cheating Death with Dr. Colbert T. Colbert, DFA" segment, Colbert discusses sleep science, weight control and men's health. Finally, Colbert interviews Charlie Savage about presidential powers.
317	"Troops Out Now"	John Mearsheimer	"Hey, penny loafers! Get to work and earn that money. This is The Colbert Report."	October 2	3124
Stephen briefly comments on a recent USA Today article about the possible end of the universe. He then discusses the feud between Kanye West and 50 Cent, and compares it to his upcoming book being released on the same day as Paul Krugman's. Next, he talks about an article in New Scientist that claims parallel universes might exist, and "The Wørd" takes place in such a parallel universe featuring an opposite version of Stephen. Colbert introduces a new segment, "Nailed 'Em," that looks at cybercrime; this segment features Wi-Fi Piggybacking. Finally, Colbert interviews John Mearsheimer about Israel's effect on U.S. foreign policy.
318	"None"	Dan Savage, Jim Lovell	"I may disagree with what you say, but I will fight to the death for my right to fight you to the death. This is The Colbert Report."	October 3	3125
Stephen corrects last night's statement that Paul Krugman's book is being released on the same day as his. He then complains about the Senate passing a bill to extend hate-crimes laws to homosexuals. He introduces a new segment, "The Gay Roundup," and interviews Dan Savage. Next, Colbert names President Bush his "Alpha Dog of the Week." In the "Monkey on the Lam" segment, he discusses a monkey in Columbia, Missouri that bit two children in a local park and is now missing. Finally, Colbert interviews Jim Lovell about the film, In the Shadow of the Moon, as well as his experiences as an astronaut.
319	"Catastrophe"	John Kao	"I already picked out my Halloween costume. I'm going as a guy who's always right. This is The Colbert Report."	October 4	3126
Stephen briefly talks about wanting to see Bigfoot dead. He then talks about Fred Thompson and how to get a round of applause without asking for one. In "The Wørd," Colbert worries that the diplomatic peace negotiations in North Korea may make people think that diplomacy works. In the "science and technology" edition of the "Threatdown:" 5. Remote Control Toys! 4. Hybrid cars! 3. Sloppy Scientists! 2. White chocolate! 1. Robots! Colbert then interviews John Kao on how America is becoming less innovative. Finally, Colbert shows an advertisement for I Am America (And So Can You!).
320	"Medium Matters"	George Saunders	"It's Columbus Day, but I won't rest until all the state capitals are recognized. This is The Colbert Report."	October 8	3127
Stephen claims that Columbus Day is the most Un-American holiday in existence, criticizing Christopher Columbus for taking away jobs from American discoverers. He then advertises I Am America (And So Can You!), and attacks Pope Benedict XVI for releasing his biography, written for children, on the same day. In "The Wørd," he claims that it is right to attack print media, but wrong to attack radio. In "Stephen Colbert's Balls for Kidz," he talks about the State Children's Health Insurance Program (SCHIP). Finally, Colbert interviews George Saunders about political commentators.
321	"Mighty Duck"	Stephen Colbert	"The following anger has been formatted to fit your television screen. This is The Colbert Report."	October 9	3128
Stephen celebrates the release of I Am America (And So Can You!). Next, he complains that Ronald Reagan isn't on any U.S. coin, and discusses upcoming changes to the penny. He then talks about the Justice Department allowing harsher treatment of alleged terrorists. Next, he discusses Barack Obama not wearing a U.S. flag pin on his lapel. Finally, Colbert interviews Stephen Colbert about his new book.
322	"Americon Dream"	Wesley Clark	"Kraft Foods, I'd make a great pasta shape. This is The Colbert Report."	October 10	3129
Stephen again talks about the items in Dennis Kucinich's pockets and demands he come on the show and empties them. He then puts Kucinich on notice and announces that Kucinich accepted his challenge and will appear on October 15. Next, Colbert comments on prison overcrowding. In the "Tip of the Hat, Wag of the Finger" segment, Colbert wags his finger at Bruce Springsteen, Molson Coors and SABMiller, and tips his hat to French youths. Finally, Colbert interviews Wesley Clark about the Iraq War and his new book.
323	"None"	Frank Gaffney, Chris Jordan	"This'll get the fight song right out of your head. (Sings) By Mennen. This is The Colbert Report."	October 11	3130
Stephen talks about Fox & Friends' "guy who's not Steve Doocy," Brian Kilmeade. He then discusses Tuesday's Republican presidential candidate debate, and whether the President needs Congressional approval to attack Iran. He interviews Frank Gaffney about companies that do business with Iran. In the "Colbert Platinum: Kidz Edition" segment, Colbert discusses children buying art, Posh Tots and Pint Size Paparazzi. Finally, Colbert interviews Chris Jordan about his photography.
324	"Enviro-medal Disaster"	Dennis Kucinich, Paul Glastris	"An apple a day keeps anyone away if you throw it hard enough. This is The Colbert Report."	October 15	3131
In the "Who's Honoring Me Now" segment, Colbert praises Marie Claire for listing I Am America (And So Can You!) as one of their "7 Things To Get Excited About." In the "Who's NOT Honoring Me Now" segment, Colbert complains about being snubbed for a Nobel Prize and that Al Gore keeps winning awards instead of him. In "By The Pocket's Red Scare – Is that a socialist welfare state in your pocket or are you just trying to destroy America?," Dennis Kucinich appears and empties his pockets, per Stephen's challenge last week. Finally, Colbert interviews Paul Glastris about college rankings.
325	"None"	Jeff Greenfield, Bob Drogin	"The following program was supposed to contain scenes of brief nudity. Thanks a lot, network. This is The Colbert Report."	October 16	3132
Stephen briefly talks about an advertisement in USA Today for CNN's documentary, Planet in Peril. In Indecision 2008: Don't F%#k This Up, America, he discusses Republican presidential candidate Fred Thompson's lack of appearances in New Hampshire, and his own appearance on The Daily Show earlier in the day. Colbert then announces his candidacy for President of the United States and interviews Jeff Greenfield about what his candidacy means. Next, he discusses Democratic presidential candidate Hillary Clinton's mention of him in one of her campaign speeches. Finally, Colbert interviews Bob Drogin about his book, Curveball.
326	"None"	Garry Kasparov	"You might want to add water because this show is concentrated truth. This is The Colbert Report."	October 17	3133
Stephen discusses his presidential campaign and the media's reaction to the announcement. He then fills out the necessary paperwork to run in the South Carolina Republican and Democratic presidential primaries. The second anniversary edition of the "Threatdown:" 5. Canada! 4. Food! 3. Toys! 2. Robots! 1. Bears! Finally, Colbert interviews Garry Kasparov about his book, How Life Imitates Chess.
327	"None"	Anderson Cooper, Craig Newmark	"Error 404. Introduction to show not found. This is The Colbert Report."	October 18	3134
Stephen introduces a new segment, "War on Halloween," and talks about how nature is fighting Halloween due to a failure in pumpkin crops. He then interviews Anderson Cooper about it, climate change in general, and CNN's Planet in Peril. Colbert then announces that his campaign will now be known as "The Hail to the Cheese Stephent Colbert Nacho Cheese Doritos 2008 Presidential Campaign." He also announces he has a new website for his campaign, Colbert08.org. After finding out he can't use a corporate sponsorship to fund his campaign, he uses it fund the show, with the segment being retitled "The Hail to the Cheese Stephent Colbert Nacho Cheese Doritos 2008 Presidential Campaign Coverage." He then interviews Craig Newmark about Craigslist. Finally, Colbert unveils his latest portrait.
328	"Absinthetinence"	Richard Berman	(Playing Peekaboo) "Hey babies, where did I go?" (Uncovers face) "This is The Colbert Report."	October 29	3135
Stephen talks about his presidential campaign and John McCain's recent comments about Osama bin Laden. Next, he discusses a USA Today Infographic, claiming it will be the last one they publish because it was about U.S. streets being named after candy. He then discourages young people from drinking absinthe. In the "Tip of the Hat, Wag of the Finger" segment, Colbert tips his hat to The New York Times and wags his finger at "gay wizards" and neuroscientists. He then talks to Richard Berman about consumer freedom. Finally, Colbert congratulates the Boston Red Sox for beating the Colorado Rockies in the World Series, thereby punishing them for trying to trademark the word "Rocktober." The word that appears next to Colbert in the opening credits changes from "GUTLY" to "WARRIOR-POET."
329	"None"	Massie Ritsch, Craig Venter	"The following anger is based on a true story. This is The Colbert Report."	October 30	3136
Stephen briefly talks about Barack Obama turning down Brad Pitt's offer to help his presidential campaign. This segues into "The Hail to the Cheese Stephent Colbert Nacho Cheese Doritos 2008 Presidential Campaign Coverage" and how his campaign may have violated federal election law. He then interviews Massie Ritsch about campaign finance. In the "Earth Attacks: Defeating The Enviro-menace" segment, Colbert discusses the California wildfires, the Georgia droughts, the Great Pacific Garbage Patch, and green burials. Finally, Colbert interviews Craig Venter about decoding his own genome.
330	"Job Description"	Lawrence Wilkerson	(Mimicking The Crypt Keeper) "This show is filmed in front of a dead studio audience. This is The Col-scare Report."	October 31	3137
Stephen complains about Halloween and talks about the items he's giving trick-or-treaters. In the "Democra-SEE Democra-DO" segment, he discusses recent elections in Argentina and Poland. Colbert then confirms that he officially entered the Democratic Primary for President of the United States in South Carolina. Next, he mentions Barack Obama challenging him to a "grit-off." In the "Monkey on the Lam: Lobster Edition" segment, Colbert talks about a group of lobsters that escaped from a supermarket in Germany. Finally, Colbert interviews Lawrence Wilkerson about the War in Iraq.

=== November ===
No.	"The Wørd"	Guest(s)	Introductory phrase	Original release date	Prod. code
331	"None"	Walter Kirn	"I'm more American than apple pie. I'm like apple pie with a hot dog in it...sexy. This is The Colbert Report."	November 1	3138
Stephen briefly discusses WWE action figures. In "The Hail to the Cheese Stephent Colbert Nacho Cheese Doritos 2008 Presidential Campaign Coverage," he talks about his campaign and shows footage of a campaign stop in South Carolina. He discusses his attempts to woo the South Carolina Democratic Party to get on the ballot, but is informed that he will not be able to appear on the ballot as a Democrat. Finally, Colbert interviews Walter Kirn about multitasking.

There were no further episodes produced in November due to the 2007–08 Writers Guild of America strike.

=== December ===
There were no episodes produced in December due to the 2007–08 Writers Guild of America strike.
