= The Best of The Colbert Report =

2007 comedy compilation DVD

The cover of The Best of The Colbert Report.

The Best of the Colbert Report is a single-disc DVD compiling memorable segments from The Colbert Report's 2005, 2006, and 2007 seasons. It was released by Comedy Central on November 6, 2007.

The compilation features a number of Better Know a District segments in which Colbert interviews members of Congress, including Eleanor Holmes Norton and Robert Wexler. Clips from The Wørd are also included, such as Truthiness and Wikiality, and some of Colbert's better-known interviews, such as Bill O'Reilly, Willie Nelson, Jane Fonda and Gloria Steinem. Other segments featured include Tip of the Hat, Wag of the Finger, The ThreatDown, Colbert's "Green Screen Challenge" and subsequent lightsaber battle with George Lucas and the "Meta-Free-Phor-All" with Sean Penn.

Copies of the DVD sold at Best Buy included a bonus disc, which contained the entire first season of Stephen Colbert Presents: Stephen Colbert's Alpha Squad 7: The New Tek Jansen Adventures.

DVD reviews were mixed, with some critics praising the selection of clips, while others suggested that the segments featured in the compilation represented the most well-known stunts as opposed to the "best". Many were critical of the amount of material on the DVD, which contains 175 minutes of clips from the show, but no bonus features.
