= American Ground =

2002 book by William Langewiesche

American Ground Unbuilding the World Trade Center
- Author: William Langewiesche
- Language: English
- Genre: Non-fiction
- Publisher: North Point Press
- Publication date: October 24, 2002
- Publication place: United States
- Media type: Print (Hardcover)
- Pages: 224 pp.
- ISBN: 9780865475823
- OCLC: 758636153
- Dewey Decimal: 974.7/1044
- LC Class: HV6432 .L364 2002

American Ground: Unbuilding the World Trade Center is a book by William Langewiesche, published in 2002, about the cleanup and recovery effort at the World Trade Center site following the September 11 attacks. Langewiesche embedded with the team managing the search and removal of The Pile, originally writing a series of articles for The Atlantic that were expanded into American Ground.

== Synopsis ==
Though the New York City Office of Emergency Management was responsible for coordinating the city's overall response in the aftermath of the World Trade Center collapse, the cleanup and recovery efforts at Ground Zero were quickly placed in the purview of the New York City Department of Design and Construction, a then-obscure Queens-based city agency that handled civic construction and permitting. From an elementary school in Battery Park City, DDC commissioner Ken Holden and deputy commissioner Mike Burton managed most of the day-to-day aspects of the site, along with an inner circle of consultants from the Port Authority of New York and New Jersey, Leslie E. Robertson Associates (founded by the lead structural engineer of the Twin Towers), LZA/Thornton Tomasetti, Mueser Rutledge Consulting Engineers, and D.H. Griffin Companies, as well as representatives from the Fire Department of New York, New York Police Department, the Port Authority Police Department, and various other state, federal, and nonprofit organizations.

Using established contacts in the city's construction industry, the DDC split Ground Zero into four quadrants and assigned AMEC, Bovis Lend Lease, Tully Construction Company, and Turner Construction to oversee the cleanup of each quadrant, though the demarcation of the quadrants blurred as the removal process accelerated. Langewiesche details the demands and dangers of the work and its managerial challenges, as decisions were mostly made on the fly, particularly by Burton, due to the unprecedented and immense scale of the cleanup effort. Ultimately, 1.5 million tons of debris was removed from the site and barged by Weeks Marine or trucked to the recently closed Fresh Kills Landfill on Staten Island, where it was searched for human remains or personal effects (such as the intact, expired identification card of Port Authority lead engineer and frequent DDC consultant Peter Rinaldi, which had been stored in his office on the 72nd floor of the North Tower and was found among rubble in Fresh Kills).

The book recounts the moments leading up to the crash of American Airlines Flight 11 and United Airlines Flight 175 into the Twin Towers, the factors that led to each building's collapse, and the key issues that arose during the cleanup effort, including fears that the site's slurry wall would fail and flood the 17-acre site to the possibility of industrial accident from excavators working atop the unstable debris pile. Langewiesche himself joined several excursions beneath The Pile where the management team assessed potential concerns, relating the journey to a ruined industrial chiller plant thought to contain a lethal amount of Freon at risk of escaping upward and quickly suffocating rescue workers as well as a search for leaks in the slurry wall. He also chronicles the tensions that arose around the site, from clashes between firefighters insistent on a methodical search of the ruins for their fallen brothers and the construction management teams who hoped to clear the site as fast as possible to the irreparable strain the cleanup effort put on Holden and Burton's professional relationship. By the end of the cleanup effort in mid-2002, several of the key players Langewiesche interviewed related a feeling of emptiness over the completion of the insular work at the site, having felt it was the most important of their lives. At the book's close, Langewiesche describes the fate of the 200,000 tons of structural steel used in the buildings, which was cut into blocks and shipped to China and India to be melted down for reuse.

== Reception ==
Praised for its matter-of-fact tone and detailed thoroughness, American Ground was listed as an essential book about the September 11 attacks and was nominated for the National Book Critics Circle Award. However, a passage about evidence of possible looting by firefighters prior to the collapse that was unearthed during the recovery effort was met with criticism and angry rebuttals upon the book's publication. In 2019, Slate included the book on its list of the 50 best non-fiction books from the past 25 years.
