= Fly by Wire (book) =

2009 book by William Langewiesche

- Author: William Langewiesche
- Language: English
- Subject: US Airways Flight 1549
- Genre: Non-fiction
- Publisher: Farrar, Straus and Giroux
- Publication date: 2009
- Publication place: United States
- ISBN: 978-0-374-15718-0

Fly by Wire: The Geese, the Glide, the Miracle on the Hudson is a book written in 2009 by William Langewiesche about US Airways Flight 1549 with emphasis on the role played by the advanced fly-by-wire flight control system of the aircraft.

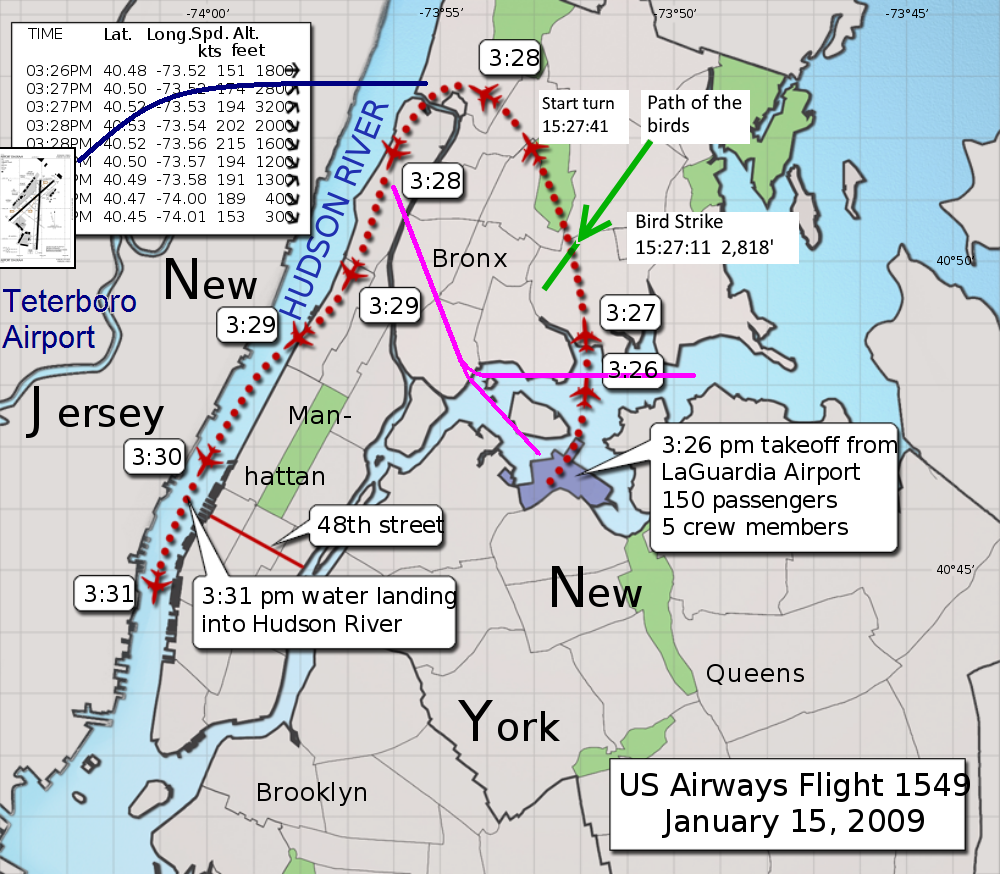
Flightpath flown (red). Alternative trajectories to Teterboro (blue) and back toward La Guardia (purple) were simulated for the investigation.

The following is an excerpt:

...the NTSB ran a study of the choices available. A simulator was programmed to duplicate the circumstances of Sullenberger's bird strike...and four pilots were enlisted to fly a series of attempts on LaGuardia. In the setup there were two important differences from the actual flight. First, the starting point was the location of the bird strike itself, not the location where Sullenberger came out of his turn. Second, the pilots knew the game in advance. ... In every case where the pilots were allowed to respond immediately to the loss of thrust by making a quick turn back to the airport, every one of them was able to land safely. ... In recognition [of the need to account for reaction time] the NTSB then imposed a thirty-second delay before allowing the simulator pilots to fly their returns--and every one of them crashed.

Sullenberger made the right decision. No matter what. ... Even if people had died because of landing in the Hudson. Going for Runway 13 [at LaGuardia] would have been a crapshoot in an environment of obstacle-strewn waters, where missing the runway by fifty feet is like missing it by a mile.
