= Wolfgang Langewiesche =

American writer and aviator (1907–2002)

Wolfgang Langewiesche (long-gah-vee-sheh; 1907–2002) was a German aviator, journalist and writer who is one of the most quoted writers in aviation writing. His book, Stick and Rudder (1944), is still in print, and is considered a primary reference on the art of flying fixed-wing aircraft. He wrote more than a hundred articles that were published in popular periodicals like Harpers Magazine, House Beautiful and Reader's Digest.

Born in Düsseldorf, Germany, in 1907, he was a graduate student in the United States during the late 1920s and migrated there in 1935. He was a graduate of the London School of Economics and earned his master's degree from Columbia University. He was in a doctoral program in the University of Chicago when he decided to learn to fly and pursue a career in aviation.

Mr. Langewiesche wrote for Air Facts magazine, an aviation safety-related publication edited by Leighton Collins, and his articles were the basis for most of Stick and Rudder. The basic facts about flying that he emphasized in 1944 have withstood much criticism since then. Over 200,000 copies of the book had been printed by 1990.

He taught "Theory of Flight" to US Army aviation cadets in the ground school at the Hawthorne School of Aeronautics in Orangeburg, South Carolina, during World War II, and test flew F4U Corsairs for the Vought Corporation. He later worked for Cessna as a test pilot and contributed several articles for Flying magazine. In the 1950s, he became Reader's Digest's roving editor, retiring in 1986.

His son, William Langewiesche, was also a well-known author, journalist, and pilot with an award-winning career with the Atlantic Monthly and Vanity Fair magazines.

== Books authored ==
- I'll Take the High Road (1939)
- Stick and Rudder: An Explanation of the Art of Flying, McGraw-Hill, New York, Copyright 1944 & 1972, ISBN 0-07-036240-8
- Lightplane Flying (1939)
- A Flier's World (1950)
