= William Langewiesche =

American author and journalist (1955–2025)

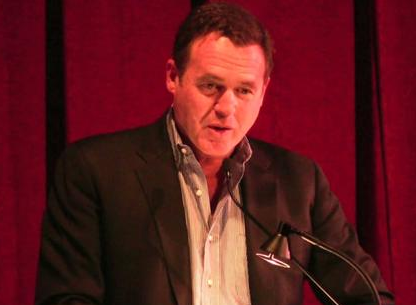
- Langewiesche in 2009
- Born: William Archibald Langewiesche; June 12, 1955; Sharon, Connecticut, U.S.
- Died: June 15, 2025 (aged 70); East Lyme, Connecticut, U.S.
- Education: Stanford University
- Occupations: author; journalist; pilot
- Children: 4
- Writing career
- Genre: non-fiction

William Archibald Langewiesche (/lɑːŋ.ɡəˈvi.ʃə/; June 12, 1955 – June 15, 2025) was an American author, journalist and commercial pilot. After taking part in aviation and flying airplanes he worked with a large-circulation aviation publication, Flying. As an author and journalist he worked as a correspondent for 16 years with The Atlantic and 13 years with Vanity Fair magazine. From 2019 until his death in 2025, he was a writer at large for The New York Times Magazine. He was the author of nine books and the winner of two National Magazine Awards.

Langewiesche wrote articles covering a wide range of topics from shipbreaking, wine critics, the Space Shuttle Columbia disaster, the disappearance of Malaysia Airlines Flight 370, modern ocean piracy, nuclear proliferation, and the World Trade Center cleanup. It was said of him that he wrote with "clear, poetic precision" and "elevated non-fiction writing to an art form".

== Education and early life ==
Langewiesche was born in Sharon, Connecticut, on June 12, 1955. His father Wolfgang was a German test pilot who had written a book, "Stick and Rudder: An Explanation of the Art of Flying". Wolfgang took his son flying from the age of four and Langewiesche made his first solo flight aged 14. His mother Priscilla (née Coleman) was a computer analyst and a professor at Princeton University Art Museum. He grew up in Princeton, New Jersey, where he attended Princeton Day School, and attended college in California, receiving a degree in cultural anthropology from Stanford University. He paid his college fees by flying air taxis and charters.

== Career ==
After college, Langewiesche moved to New York City and worked as a writer for Flying, a large-circulation publication for general aviation pilots. He wrote technical reports on the flight characteristics of various aircraft and profiles of people. He quit the job in his mid-twenties in order to write books—one non-fiction and two novels— which were not published.

Langewiesche continued to travel and write, supporting himself by flying airplanes. His travels took him to the most remote parts of the Sahara desert and sub-Saharan West Africa which became the subject of a cover story for The Atlantic Monthly in 1991, and later of a book, Sahara Unveiled, after he had sent an unsolicited 20,000 word manuscript to the magazine. One of Atlantic's editors, Cullen Murphy, remembered Langewiesche's writing as "a blend of natural history, travelogue, black humour and adventure story, rendered in deceptively simple prose." He became a correspondent for The Atlantic and wrote for the magazine for 15 years "on a vast array of topics". With his experience as a professional pilot and knowledge of flying he often wrote about air disasters.

After the attacks in the US of 9/11, Langewiesche was the only journalist given full and unrestricted access to the World Trade Center site in New York. He stayed there for nearly six months and wrote a serialized report, "American Ground, for The Atlantic, the longest piece of reporting the magazine had published. A book, "American Ground: Unbuilding the World Trade Center" became a New York Times national bestselling book.

The Atlantic sent Langewiesche to various parts of the world and increasingly into conflict zones. As national correspondent for The Atlantic, he was a finalist for eight consecutive National Magazine Awards. In 2006, while living in Baghdad to cover the Iraq War, Langewiesche left The Atlantic, which had moved to Washington, after 16 years and joined Vanity Fair, where he was an international correspondent until 2019. His final magazine position was as writer at large at the New York Times Magazine, from 2019 to his death in 2025.

Langewiesche's 2007 article "Jungle Law" involved him in the controversy surrounding Chevron Corporation and Steven R. Donziger.

== Personal life and death ==
Langewiesche was the son of German aviator, test pilot, and journalist Wolfgang Langewiesche, author of Stick and Rudder, and Priscila (née Coleman). He had a sister, Lena. He lived in California, New York and France.

Langewiesche married Anne-Marie Girard in 1977; they had two children, Matthew and Anna. They divorced in 2017. Langewiesche married designer Tia Cibani in 2018 with whom he had two more children, Archibald and Castine.

Langewiesche died of prostate cancer in East Lyme, Connecticut, on June 15, 2025, three days after his 70th birthday.

== Awards ==
=== Winner ===
- 2007 National Magazine Award for Public Interest for Rules of Engagement
- 2002 National Magazine Award for Reporting for The Crash of EgyptAir 990

=== Finalist ===
- 2008 National Magazine Award for Reporting for City of Fear
- 2007 Michael Kelly Award
- 2006 National Magazine Award for Reporting for The Wrath of Khan
- 2005 Lettre Ulysses Award for The Outlaw Sea
- 2005 National Magazine Award for Feature Writing for A Sea Story
- 2004 National Magazine Award for Reporting for Columbia's Last Flight
- 2004 Lettre Ulysses Award for the Art of Reportage for American Ground: Unbuilding the World Trade Center
- 2003 National Magazine Award for Reporting for American Ground: Unbuilding the World Trade Center
- 2002 National Book Critic's Circle Award for American Ground: Unbuilding The World Trade Center
- 2001 National Magazine Award for Profiles for The Million-Dollar Nose
- 2000 National Magazine Award for Profiles for Eden: A Gated Community
- 1999 National Magazine Award for Reporting for The Lessons of ValuJet 592
- 1992 National Magazine Award for Feature Writing for The World in Its Extreme

== Bibliography ==
=== Books ===
- Langewiesche, William (1993). Cutting for Sign. New York: Pantheon Books. ISBN 978-0-679-41113-0.
- — (1996). Sahara Unveiled: A Journey Across the Desert. New York: Pantheon Books. ISBN 978-0-679-42982-1.
- — (1998). Inside the Sky: A Meditation on Flight. USA: Pantheon Books. ISBN 978-0-679-42983-8.
- — (2002). American Ground: Unbuilding the World Trade Center. New York: North Point Press. ISBN 978-0-86547-582-3.
- — (2004). The Outlaw Sea: A World of Freedom, Chaos, and Crime. New York: North Point Press. ISBN 978-0-86547-581-6.
- — (2007). The Atomic Bazaar: The Rise of the Nuclear Poor. New York: Farrar, Straus and Giroux. ISBN 978-0-374-10678-2.
- — (2009). Fly by Wire: The Geese, the Glide, the Miracle on the Hudson. New York: Farrar, Straus and Giroux. ISBN 978-0-374-15718-0.
- — (2010). Aloft: Thoughts on the Experience of Flight. New York: Vintage. ISBN 978-0-307-74148-6.
- — (2012). Finding the Devil: Darkness, Light, and the Untold Story of the Chilean Mine Disaster. Byliner. ISBN 978-1-614-52052-8.

=== Essays and reporting ===
1990s

- Langewiesche, William (November 25, 1990). "Riding the Mali Express to Dakar". The New York Times.
- — (November 1991). "The World in Its Extreme". Longform.org.
- — (November 1993). "Vacations in the Sahara". The Atlantic.
- — (December 1993). "The Turn". The Atlantic.
- — (August 1994). "Turabi's Law". The Atlantic.
- — (October 1997). "Slam and Jam". The Atlantic.
- — (February 1998). "Invisible Men". The New Yorker.
- — (March 1998). "The Lessons of ValuJet 592". The Atlantic.
- — (June 1999). "Eden: A Gated Community". The Atlantic.

2000s

- Langewiesche, William (August 2000). "The Shipbreakers". The Atlantic.
- — (December 2000). "The Million-Dollar Nose". The Atlantic.
- — (April 2001). "The Profits of Doom". The Atlantic.
- — (October 2001). "Peace is Hell". The Atlantic.
- — (November 2001). "The Crash of EgyptAir 990". The Atlantic.
- — (December 2001). "Storm Island". The Atlantic.
- — (July–August 2002). "American Ground: Unbuilding the World Trade Center, Part I: The Inner World". The Atlantic.
- — (September 2002). "American Ground: Unbuilding the World Trade Center, Part II: The Rush to Recover". The Atlantic.
- — (October 2002). "American Ground: Unbuilding the World Trade Center, Part III: The Dance of the Dinosaurs". The Atlantic.
- — (September 2003). "Anarchy At Sea". The Atlantic.
- — (November 2003). "Columbia's Last Flight". The Atlantic.
- — (January–February 2004). "A Two-Planet Species". The Atlantic.
- — (May 2004). "A Sea Story". The Atlantic.
- — (November 2004). "Welcome to the Green Zone". The Atlantic.
- — (January–February 2005). "Letter From Baghdad". The Atlantic.
- — (March 2005). "The Accuser". The Atlantic.
- — (May 2005). "Hotel Baghdad". The Atlantic.
- — (June 2005). "Ziad for the Defense". The Atlantic.
- — (November 2005). "The Wrath of Khan". The Atlantic.
- — (January–February 2006). "The Point of No Return". The Atlantic.
- — (November 2006). "Rules of Engagement". Vanity Fair.
- — (December 2006). "How To Get A Nuclear Bomb". The Atlantic.
- — (April 2007). "City of Fear". Vanity Fair.
- — (May 2007). "Jungle Law". Vanity Fair.
- — (July 2007). "Congo From The Cockpit". Vanity Fair.
- — (November 2007). "The Mega-Bunker of Baghdad". Vanity Fair.
- — (February 2008). "A Face in the Crowd". Vanity Fair.
- — (April 2008). "Beijing's Olympic Makeover". Vanity Fair.
- — (May 2008). "Stealing Weather". Vanity Fair.
- — (December 2008). "House of War". Vanity Fair.
- — (January 2009). "The Devil at 37,000 Feet". Vanity Fair.
- — (April 2009). "The Pirate Latitudes". Vanity Fair.
- — (June 2009). "Anatomy of a Miracle". Vanity Fair.
- — (December 26, 2009). "Towers of Strength". The New York Times.

2010s

- Langewiesche, William (February 2010). "The Distant Executioner". Vanity Fair.
- — (February 2011). "The Wave-Maker". Vanity Fair.
- — (May 2012). "The Camorra Never Sleeps". Vanity Fair.
- — (December 2012). "The Expendables". Vanity Fair.
- — (May 2013). "The Man Who Pierced the Sky". Vanity Fair.
- — (October 2013). "What Lies Beneath". Vanity Fair.
- — (April 2014). "The Chaos Company". Vanity Fair.
- — (October 2014). "The Human Factor". Vanity Fair.
- — (December 2014). "Salvage Beast". Vanity Fair.
- — (March 2015). "Everything You Need to Know About Flying Virgin Galactic". Vanity Fair.
- — (June 2015). "How One U.S. Soldier Blew the Whistle on a Cold-Blooded War Crime". Vanity Fair.
- — (November 2015). "Can a French Friar End the 21st-Century Slave Trade?". Vanity Fair.
- — (October 2016). "Welcome to the Dark Net, a Wilderness Where Invisible World Wars Are Fought and Hackers Roam Free". Vanity Fair.
- — (June 2017). "How Extreme Heat Could Leave Swaths of the Planet Uninhabitable". Vanity Fair.
- — (January 2018). "The 10-Minute Mecca Stampede That Made History". Vanity Fair.
- — (April 2018). ""The Clock Is Ticking": Inside the Worst U.S. Maritime Disaster in Decades". Vanity Fair.
- — (July–August 2018). "An Extraordinarily Expensive Way to Fight ISIS". The Atlantic.
- — (January 8, 2019). "Leave No Soldier Behind". Vanity Fair.
- — (July 2019). "Good night. Malaysian Three-Seven-Zero". The Atlantic. Vol. 324, no. 1. pp. 78–94.
- — (September 18, 2019). "What Really Brought Down the 737 Max?". The New York Times.

2020s

- Langewiesche, William (August 4, 2020). "The Reporter Who Told the World About the Bomb". The New York Times.
- — (March 16, 2022). "The War for the Rainforest". The New York Times.
- — (December 2, 2024). "The Secret Pentagon War Game That Offers a Stark Warning for Our Times". The New York Times.
