= Those Who Trespass =

1998 novel by Bill O'Reilly

- Author: Bill O'Reilly
- Language: English
- Genre: Crime fiction
- Publisher: Broadway Books (2004)
- Publication date: 1998, re-released in 2004
- Publication place: United States

Those Who Trespass: A Novel of Television and Murder (ISBN 0-7679-1381-7) is a 1998 novel by US television personality Bill O'Reilly. The story focuses on the revenge a television journalist exacts on network staff after disputes very similar to O'Reilly's real tensions with CBS (such as one involving Falklands War footage). The revenge takes the form of a series of graphically described murders.

The novel was first published in 1998 by a small publishing house, and rereleased in 2004 by Broadway Books as a trade paperback.

On July 13, 2011, in O'Reilly's "Backstage Conversation" video section of the BillOreilly.com website, he responded to a viewer who asked "Does Mel Gibson still own the rights to Those who Trespass?" O'Reilly replied, "He does not. We had two cycles with Mr. Gibson's production company—this was before he got into all the trouble—and now I own it again. So hopefully someone will step up."

== Plot summary ==
The antagonist is a tall, "no-nonsense" television journalist named Shannon Michaels, described as the product of two Celtic parents, who is pushed out by Global News Network, and systematically murders the people who ruined his career.

Meanwhile, the protagonist, a "straight-talking" Irish-American New York City homicide detective named Tommy O’Malley, is charged with solving the murders that Michaels has committed, while competing with Michaels for the heart of Ashley Van Buren, a blond, sexy aristocrat turned crime columnist. Some reviewers have said that Michaels and O'Malley are "thinly veiled versions" of O'Reilly.

Michaels' first victim is a news correspondent who stole his story in Argentina, and got him into trouble with the network. He then stalks the woman who forced his resignation from the network and throws her off a balcony. After that he murders a television research consultant who had advised the local station to dismiss him by burying him in beach sand up to his neck and letting him slowly drown. Finally, during a break in the Radio-Television News Directors Association convention, he slits the throat of the station manager. After this, he is pursued by O'Malley and Van Buren, where he attempts to lose them by crossing a runway in front of a speeding jet. Although he makes it, his car's right back tire is cut by the jet's wing, causing the car to spin, flip over, and be subsequently melted by the exhaust from the jet, which explodes. Michaels dies in extreme agony, as his contacts (used to hide his identity) burn into his eyes and a chunk of the car crushes his head in.

== Reception ==
The New Yorker called the book O'Reilly's "most ambitious and deeply felt piece of writing. 'Those Who Trespass' is a revenge fantasy, and it displays extraordinarily violent impulses". Michael Hastings, of Salon.com, commented that the book gave the reader a look inside the author's mind. "The talented talk-show host serves up characters who are paranoid, arrogant, insecure and supremely egotistical. On television, those qualities are O'Reilly's greatest assets".

The satirist Stephen Colbert, who parodies O'Reilly on his show The Colbert Report, stated that his sci-fi character Tek Jansen was originally inspired by O'Reilly and Those Who Trespass. The character originated in a fictional book that his political pundit character constantly referred to and promoted on his show. Tek Jansen, an idealised version of Colbert's character on The Colbert Report, is a reference to the accusations of the characters in Those Who Trespass being based on O'Reilly.

In his book Lies and the Lying Liars Who Tell Them, former US Senator Al Franken, discussed O'Reilly's graphic depiction of a sexual encounter between Shannon Michaels and Ashley Van Buren, suggesting that this made O'Reilly guilty of hypocrisy when he later criticized rap artist Ludacris for indecent and profane lyrics in his songs. The encounter is referenced throughout the novel in different forms, such as a fictional sexual relationship between Florida Secretary of State Katherine Harris and Mac Stipanovich in 2000 and a dirty story O'Reilly tells Supreme Court Justice Clarence Thomas in Vietnam.
