= Tek Jansen =

- Tek Jansen, as seen in the animated series.

Publication information
- Publisher: Oni Press
- First appearance: The Colbert Report Episode #1007 (October 2005); Stephen Colbert's Tek Jansen #1 (July 2007)
- Created by: Writers of The Colbert Report

In-story information
- Full name: Tek Jansen
- Team affiliations: Alpha Squad 7
- Partnerships: Porpy the Porpoise
- Abilities: "Super awesome spectacular ultra-spy."

Tek Jansen is a fictional character featured on The Colbert Report and in a comic book series published by Oni Press. Jansen originated as a recurring joke in the form of a supposed self-published science fiction novel on the Report, reportedly as a parody of Bill O'Reilly's 1998 novel, Those Who Trespass. The character later appeared on the show in a series of animated shorts entitled Stephen Colbert Presents Stephen Colbert's Alpha Squad 7: A Tek Jansen Adventure, with Jansen voiced by Stephen Colbert, and in 2007 became the protagonist of a five-part comic series.

An agent for the elite Alpha Squad 7, Jansen is portrayed as heroic, powerful and irresistible to women: essentially, he is an idealized version of the Report's host, who supposedly created him.

== Appearances ==
=== Novel ===
Jansen was introduced on The Colbert Report on the October 26, 2005 episode as the protagonist of Stephen Colbert's fictitious self-published 1,800-page novel, Stephen Colbert's Alpha Squad 7: Lady Nocturne: A Tek Jansen Adventure. The novel became a recurring joke, with Colbert occasionally discussing the manuscript and reading passages while lamenting that no publisher has distributed the book yet. Although a copy of the novel was seen on the show and at the Stephen Colbert Museum and Gift Shop in Tuscumbia, Colbert County, Alabama, the former copy is actually "The Rolling Stone Encyclopedia Of Rock & Roll" with a new cover glued over the original, and the latter copy was merely blank pages. A number of chapters were made available on the show's official website, ColbertNation.com. In the show's April 3, 2008 episode, Colbert claimed that a total of twenty publishers had turned down the novel.

=== Animated series ===
Stephen Colbert's Alpha Squad 7: Lady Nocturne: A Tek Jansen Adventure.

On August 8, 2006, the Report debuted a series of three to four-minute-long animated shorts entitled Stephen Colbert Presents: Stephen Colbert's Alpha Squad 7: The New Tek Jansen Adventures, allegedly in response to a lack of publisher interest in the novel. Jansen is voiced by Colbert himself.

==== Season one ====
The first six episodes were designed, animated, and produced by J.J. Sedelmaier Productions and producer Samantha Scharff. They tend to be formulaic in nature, regularly working in Jansen's signature exclamations (such as "Solar Plexus!" and "Parum-pum!") and reference to his having had "hundreds of girlfriends". Jansen typically both saves the day and seduces every woman in the story, villains included, and the episode invariably ends on a cliffhanger with a naked Jansen in mortal danger.

The entire first season was included in a bonus disc accompanying copies of The Best of The Colbert Report.

Season 1 – Episode Title	Writers	Airdate
Operation: Heart of The Phoenix – Dead or Alive: A Tek Jansen Adventure	Peter Gwinn and Rob Dubbin	August 8, 2006
Operation: Destiny's Underbelly: Entrapped!: A Tek Jansen Adventure	Peter Gwinn and Laura Krafft	September 18, 2006
Operation: Aurora Strikes Midnight: Courage's Arrival: A Tek Jansen Adventure	Peter Gwinn and Eric Drysdale	October 11, 2006
Operation: Homecoming's Doorstep: Cat on a Luniharp: A Tek Jansen Adventure	Peter Gwinn and Tom Purcell	December 6, 2006
Operation: Hounds of Hell: Ragtime Billy Peaches: A Tek Jansen Adventure	Peter Gwinn and Glenn Eichler	January 10, 2007
Operation: Dragontongue: Chocolate Blades Of Thunder: A Tek Jansen Adventure	Peter Gwinn and Jay Katsir	February 7, 2007

==== Season two ====
On September 12, 2007, the Report debuted the first of a projected eight new Tek Jansen episodes. This second series, which was being produced by FlickerLab, covers the early history of Jansen, from his humble beginnings as a young, physically awkward space dog vendor. Unlike Series One, which has little to no continuity between episodes, Series Two followed a continuous narrative. Though projected as an eight-part series, no new episodes were completed after episode 3 debuted in January, 2009.

Season 2 – Episode Title	Writers	Airdate
Beginning's First Dawn: A Tek Jansen Adventure: Chapter 1	Peter Gwinn and Glenn Eichler	September 12, 2007
Beginning's First Dawn: A Tek Jansen Adventure: Chapter 2	Rob Dubbin and Frank Lesser	April 3, 2008
Beginning's First Dawn: A Tek Jansen Adventure: Chapter 3	Glenn Eichler, Peter Gwinn, Eric Drysdale, and Michael Brumm	January 5, 2009

==== Cameos ====
Tek Jansen made a brief cameo appearance in Colbert's music video of Daft Punk's "Get Lucky", aired on August 6, 2013. According to Colbert, the video was produced in anticipation of Daft Punk's appearance on that evening's show; however, the band was forced to cancel at the last minute due to a conflict with the MTV Video Music Awards. Robin Thicke performed instead, but Colbert aired the video as originally planned.

Tek Jansen made a final cameo appearance on the very last episode of The Colbert Report on December 18, 2014, as part of a montage of a number of celebrities singing "We'll Meet Again". Jansen sings it in a stilted way reminiscent of William Shatner's famous 1977 spoken word performance of "Rocket Man".

=== Comics ===
Stephen Colbert's Tek Jansen #1 (July 2007). Cover by John Cassaday. This cover art is also used for the graphic novel (August 2009)

On June 24, 2006, Comedy Central announced that Oni Press would publish a five-part comic book adaptation of the Tek Jansen novel as Stephen Colbert's Tek Jansen Adventures, a multi-part series of comics. The first issue was published on July 11, 2007. The second had been scheduled for a December 26, 2007 release, but was delayed due to the Writers Guild of America strike. It was finally released on July 2, 2008. Issue 3 was released on August 3, 2008. Issues 4 and 5 were released in 2009. On August 12, 2009, the five issues were collected into a 136-page graphic novel.

Each comic has two stories, the first one—written by John Layman and Tom Peyer, with art by Scott Chantler—part of an ongoing serialized story, and the second one—written by Jim Massey with art by Robbi Rodriguez—a stand-alone "backup story".

Colbert and his staff were very involved in guiding the style of both the writing and the artwork. Artist Scott Chantler recalls that it was assumed the comics would follow the "animated" look of the cartoons, however Colbert wanted a more serious dramatic tone "that played it as straight as he does on the show", and the artwork was toned down to suit this theme. Chantler describes the style as similar to that of a space adventure comic from the early 1960s: "heroic and dramatic, but still appealing and fun, and funny in spite of itself. The theory I'm going on is that this is a cool old comic of which the animated segments are silly Saturday morning versions (even though the reverse is actually true)". Writers John Layman and Tom Peyer also recall having to tone down Jansen's character, whom they initially wrote as "Stephen Colbert in space", with "a robot eagle sidekick and he was going after alien bears". Of Colbert's contributions, Jim Massey says the most influential was his desire that the comics not contain any reference to present-day Earth.

The cover of several of the Tek Jansen comic issues are briefly shown in the September 17, 2014 episode of The Colbert Report during the segment depicting Colbert's "Prince Hawkcat" character at the 2014 San Diego Comic-Con.

== Fictional biography ==
In his youth, Tek Jansen was a shy and physically awkward space-dog vendor who worked at sport and political venues and had never even had a single girlfriend. However, after inadvertently learning of his future nemesis Thurmond Chang's sinister plans to take over the universe and witnessing the murder of the Alpha Squad agent sent to stop him, Jansen found himself unexpectedly plunged into a new adventure. In his dying moments, the Alpha Squad agent handed Tek his nano fiche with instructions to deliver it to Alpha Squad headquarters, thus setting him on a new path.

From these humble beginnings (enhanced by rigorous training and a desperate last minute injection of super soldier serum), Jansen has become an elite agent who has had hundreds of girlfriends. He has wrestled with numerous villains, and continues to face off against Thurmond Chang and "those affiliated with the Thurmond Chang Gang". He also appears at one point to have had a sidekick, Porpy the Porpoise a "zany" space porpoise.

His sidekick, Porpy the Porpoise, is described as a "zany" space porpoise. While his appearances on the television series have petered out somewhat, his involvement in the graphic novel is ongoing and is included in almost all of the comics. Porpy was prominently featured in "Porpy's story", a short side-story in which Porpy's background is alluded to by Tek, but not told fully, as Tek becomes distracted by an adventure and forgets about Porpy altogether. In the television show Porpy is voiced by stock porpoise sounds and bubbles.

== Characteristics ==
Described by some reviewers as a "Mary Sue", Jansen is essentially an idealized version of Colbert's character. The cover of the fictitious novel depicts Colbert (wearing a space suit) as Jansen, and Colbert also provides the character's voice in the animated series. The animated series frequently mentions the fact that Jansen has "obviously had hundreds of girlfriends", and he invariably seduces and beds every woman he encounters, including his enemies. The theme song, which debuted on November 8, 2006, describes Jansen as a "super awesome spectacular ultra-spy", and further notes that his "exciting exploits would sell millions of books".

Chantler says he attempts to draw Jansen "as if he were the most confident man in the universe" and that "this is a character who's convinced he's right about everything". Although his behavior is regularly a source of comedy, Jansen has no sense of humor about himself and is rarely seen to smile in either the animated series or the comics. The only exception in the animated series was a two-second laugh with a pair of Jansen's subordinates in the second episode of the first series, with a comically abrupt ending.
