= Stick and Rudder =

1944 book by Wolfgang Langewiesche

Stick and Rudder, an Explanation of the Art of Flying
- First edition
- Author: Wolfgang Langewiesche
- Illustrator: Jo Kotula
- Publisher: McGraw-Hill
- Publication date: 1944
- Publication place: United States
- Pages: 389
- ISBN: 978-0-07-036240-6

Stick and Rudder: An Explanation of the Art of Flying (ISBN 978-0-07-036240-6) is a book written in 1944 by Wolfgang Langewiesche, describing how airplanes fly and how they should be flown by pilots. It has become a standard reference text for aviators. Written well before the proliferation of cockpit electronics, navigational aids, and air traffic control radio, the book focuses primarily on fundamental skills specific to flying the aircraft in its stripped-down basic form.
