= Better Know a District =

Television program segment

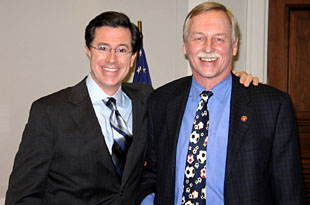
Colbert with Congressman Vic Snyder (D-Arkansas), whose district became "Better Known" on February 15, 2007

Better Know a District (also known as BKAD) was a recurring segment on The Colbert Report. It offered a humorous examination of a different United States congressional district in each segment and generally included an interview with that district's member of Congress.

== Structure ==
Each segment began with basic information about a specific district, such as history and geography, and sometimes a humorously bizarre event that happened there. The district is also almost invariably referred to as "fightin'", as in the "Fightin' 11th". All segments featured an interview with its representative.

One comedic maneuver that Colbert commonly employed in these interviews, particularly when he interviewed Democrats, was to ask the representative a loaded question of either "George W. Bush: great president, or the greatest president?", or "the Iraq War: great war, or the greatest war?" When the interviewee tried to express their disapproval of Bush, Colbert usually stated that the only choice was between "Great or Greatest", and nearly always stated, "I'm gonna put you down for 'Great'." (He often referred to previous Democratic representatives whom he put down as saying Bush was a "great" president.)

After the interview, Colbert added the segment to "the big board", a map of the entire United States with district lines drawn; the new district, shown in sparkling gold on a blue background, was usually very difficult or impossible to see due to its small size. Though many districts were profiled, the map always looked largely vacant overall.

== Reactions of interviewees ==
Although the interviews intentionally showed most of the representatives in an unflattering light, the representatives' post-interview reactions have varied. Colbert's interview with Massachusetts Representative Barney Frank resulted in Frank lambasting the program (he was quoted on a later Report), while the interview with Virginia Representative Jim Moran pleased the congressman – he told The New York Times that he thought Colbert "let [him] off kind of light."

California Representative Brad Sherman appeared to be in on the joke. He claimed not to know that his San Fernando Valley district was home to the pornography industry, gave an apparently long and dull explanation of a tax proposal, and participated in the making of a "pornographic video" with Colbert and impersonated a robot.

The Washington Times published a story on the show stating that "several lawmakers said doing the spoof spot on 'The Colbert Report' on TV's Comedy Central actually has raised their profiles back home"; however, the Los Angeles Times has reported that due to the fact that many House members have "stumbled badly" during this segment, others are not risking "the price for looking stupid" and were passing up the opportunity to be on Colbert's Better Know a District.

On his November 7, 2006, show, Colbert lauded the fact that every one of the 28 actual congressmen whom he had interviewed by that point won election or reelection, which he claims to have been because they were given the "Colbert Bump".

Because of the way Colbert intentionally tried to skewer congressmen in his interviews, former Democratic Caucus chairman Rahm Emanuel advised his fellow Democrats not to appear on the show, causing Colbert to make fun of Emanuel's advice on the show. Better Know a District segments subsequently began appearing much less frequently on the Report, suggesting many in Congress took Emanuel's advice. In January 2009, Colbert received what he jocularly claimed was a letter from U.S. Speaker of the House of Representatives Nancy Pelosi and said he was cleared to begin interviewing congressmen once again. He began the 2009 season of Better Know a District by interviewing Republican congressman Jason Chaffetz instead of a Democratic congressman.

Following the 2010 congressional election on November 2, 2010, for the first time since the show began, a congressman who appeared on the Colbert Report's Better Know a District segment was not reelected in a general election (in fact, several). On November 3, 2010, Colbert ran a segment showing clips of those fallen friends called "We Hardly Better Knew Ye".

== District count ==
A map of all U.S. congressional districts covered in Better Know a District as of April 2013. Better Know a District Even Better-er Know a District (districts featured twice) Better Know a Protectorate (unincorporated territories) Never Existed to Me

Better Know a District began as a "435-part series", 435 being the number of United States congressional districts; however, on November 29, 2005, Colbert banned California's 50th district after his "friend" Randy "Duke" Cunningham, the 50th's representative, pled guilty to receiving over $2 million in bribes and resigned his seat. California's 50th is now the lone member of the "Never Existed to Me" category, and the map showing the United States' congressional districts now looks as if the district does not even exist. This brought the series to a "434-part series". After this, Texas's 22nd congressional district was retired on April 4, 2006, when Tom DeLay announced that he planned to leave Congress. Texas's 22nd was reinstated on June 8, 2006, with a fake interview in which video of DeLay in three previous interviews on other television networks was interspersed with questions from Colbert. The district was put back into retirement at the end of the segment.

In the show's first year, 34 districts were profiled.

The original district map lacked Michigan's Upper Peninsula. During a phone-in segment, a resident of Michigan's 1st, which includes all of the Upper Peninsula as well as a sizable portion of the northern Lower Peninsula, reported this absence. Colbert informed the caller that he lived in Canada and if it was not on Colbert's map, it was not a part of the United States. The Upper Peninsula was added to the map the next time it was shown.

During the interview with Eleanor Holmes Norton, Colbert established that the District of Columbia was not a state, and thus the District of Columbia was not a part of the United States. The Better Know a District map was updated with an asterisk notation to reflect this fact. Furthermore, the count of 435 districts does not include non-voting districts, such as the District of Columbia; however, this segment was included in the district count, filling in for California's 50th district's absence, restoring the total to 435.

After the 2006 midterm elections, Colbert was invited to a meeting of the incoming House freshmen at Harvard's John F. Kennedy School of Government. During this encounter, he brought his total of "better-known districts" from 36 up to 51 (including a British parliamentary constituency); however, he did not count these as installments, and the count picked up at 37 with the next regular installment. The show aired on December 12, 2006.

After completing the fourth installment on November 9, 2005, he quipped, "At the rate of one district a week, we should complete the series by February 2014." However, in February 2014 he was only on the 87th of 434 districts, leaving him 20% complete after 8.5 years. That rate would place the series completion date in April 2048, had the show not ended.

== List of districts "Better Known" ==
The districts covered in "Better Know a District" are shown below. Segment numbers are listed starting with the 37th installment as they no longer correspond to the actual number of districts profiled. The Washington Post has reprinted transcripts from segments of "Better Know a District".

=== Season 1 (2005) ===
#	District	Guest	Date aired	Notes
1	Georgia - 1	Jack Kingston (R)	October 18	
2	Massachusetts - 4	Barney Frank (D)	October 27	
3	Ohio - 11	Stephanie Tubbs Jones (D)	November 3	Included "Judge Tubbs," a fake judicial show; Tubbs Jones, a former judge, said she always wanted to have her own courtroom show. This segment was shown again when Jones died in 2008.
4	Florida - 7	John Mica (R)	November 9	
5	Colorado - 2	Mark Udall (D)	November 16	
6	Michigan - 13	Carolyn Cheeks Kilpatrick (D)	November 30	
7	Virginia - 8	Jim Moran (D)	December 6	Virginia's 11th congressional district is highlighted on map
8	New York - 11	Major Owens (D)	December 15	

=== Season 2 (2006) ===
#	District	Guest	Date aired	Notes
9	New Jersey - 9	Steve Rothman (D)	January 12	
10	New York - 17	Eliot L. Engel (D)	January 19	Reintroduced in "Better Know a Memory"
11	New Jersey - 8	Bill Pascrell (D)	January 25	
12	New York - 8	Jerrold Nadler (D)	February 2	
13	Pennsylvania - 2	Chaka Fattah (D)	February 8	
14	New Jersey - 13	none	February 21	Bob Menendez (D) had resigned after being appointed to the Senate, so the seat was vacant at the time. The Clerk of the House, Karen L. Haas, who was responsible for official business in the district at the time refused to talk to the show.
15	California - 39	Linda Sánchez (D)	March 9	
16	California - 27	Brad Sherman (D)	March 22	Reintroduced in "Better Know a Memory"
17	California - 29	Adam Schiff (D)	March 29	
18	Oregon - 5	Darlene Hooley (D)	April 6	
19	Maryland - 4	Albert Wynn (D)	April 20	
20	Georgia - 11	Phil Gingrey (R)	April 26	First interview to receive an extension via "Betterer Know a District"
21	Oregon - 3	Earl Blumenauer (D)	May 4	
22	Nebraska - 2	Lee Terry (R)	May 10	
23	Texas - 22	Tom DeLay (R)	June 8	An interview pieced together from video clips taken out of context. Later he would have an ordinary interview with Stephen.
24	Georgia - 8	Lynn Westmoreland (R)	June 14	Asked if he could name the Ten Commandments, but the episode aired with him only being able to name three. His press secretary says that he named seven, but that four of them were edited out. Reintroduced in "Better Know a Memory."
25	Colorado - 1	Diana DeGette (D)	June 22	
26	Washington - 2	Rick Larsen (D)	July 12	
27	Florida - 19	Robert Wexler (D)	July 20	Reappeared on the show on November 7, but was more careful with what he said. He was reintroduced in "Better Know a Memory" the following day.
28	District of Columbia	Eleanor Holmes Norton (D)	July 27	Reappeared on the show on November 7, 2006; March 22 and April 24, 2007; February 12, 2008; and February 11, 2009.
29	California - 6	Lynn Woolsey (D)	August 10	Prompted "Stephen Colbert's Green Screen Challenge"
30	California - 31	Xavier Becerra (D)	August 17	
31	New Jersey - 3	Rich Sexton (D)	September 12	Representative Jim Saxton declined to be on the show, so Colbert interviewed his challenger instead (defeated).
32	New Jersey - 5	Paul Aronsohn (D)	September 21	Representative Scott Garrett declined to be on the show, so Colbert interviewed his challenger instead (defeated).
33	Florida - 16	Mark Foley (R)	October 5	Colbert did not actually interview Mark Foley, but instead supposedly sent the former representative an SMS/IM (a reference to the scandal that forced Foley to resign his seat).
34	New Jersey - 4	Carol Gay (D)	October 12	Representative Chris Smith declined to be on the show, so Colbert interviewed his challenger instead (defeated).
35	New York - 19	John Hall (D)	October 19	Representative Sue W. Kelly declined to be on the show, so Colbert interviewed her challenger instead. John Hall subsequently won his race with 51%, the only interviewed challenger from '06 to do so. He reappeared on the show the next day (November 8), and because he is a former pop star, sang the national anthem along with Stephen.
36	California - 30	David Nelson Jones (R)	November 1	Representative Henry Waxman declined to be on the show, so Colbert interviewed his challenger instead (defeated).
37	Ohio - 18	Zack Space (D)	December 12	Returns for a full segment on February 7, 2007.
38	Pennsylvania - 8	Patrick Murphy (D)	December 12	
39	California - 11	Jerry McNerney (D)	December 12	
40	Vermont - AL	Peter Welch (D)	December 12	"I get to light up an entire state?"
41	New Hampshire - 2	Paul Hodes (D)	December 12	
42	Kentucky - 3	John Yarmuth (D)	December 12	"John Yarmuth... I knew that." Returns for a full segment on March 8, 2007.
43	Shrewsbury and Atcham	Daniel Kawczynski (Conservative)	December 12	First British House of Commons member to be counted
44	New Hampshire - 1	Carol Shea-Porter (D)	December 12	
45	Kansas - 2	Nancy Boyda (D)	December 12	"You're better known."
46	Pennsylvania - 10	Chris Carney (D)	December 12	"Better known." Returns for a full segment in 2007.
47	Illinois - 17	Phil Hare (D)	December 12	"Consider yourself better known." Returns for a full segment on March 15, 2007.
48	Pennsylvania - 4	Jason Altmire (D)	December 12	"Better known." Returns for a full segment on January 24, 2007.
49	Iowa - 2	Dave Loebsack (D)	December 12	"Consider yourself better known."
50	Minnesota - 1	Tim Walz (D)	December 12	"Err, Uh. I just better knew you. 'kay, he's better known."
51	Hawaii - 2	Mazie Hirono (D)	December 12	Used "tap and run" approach to better-know. Now junior United States senator from Hawaii.

=== Season 3 (2007) ===
#	District	Guest	Installment	Date aired	Notes
52	Washington - 3	Brian Baird (D)	37th	January 17	Interviewed by Colbert with the use of a sock puppet and a sausage.
48	Pennsylvania - 4	Jason Altmire (D)	38th	January 24	Defeated by Colbert in a game of paper football. First congressman from December 12, 2006, segment to return for a profile.
53	New York - 6	Gregory W. Meeks (D)	39th	January 31	Features Colbert as "Fidel Castro." "Let me ask you this: Speaker Pelosi, disgrace to the office or the greatest disgrace to office?"
37	Ohio - 18	Zack Space (D)	40th	February 7	Second congressman from December 12, 2006, segment to return for a profile.
54	Arkansas - 2	Vic Snyder (D)	41st	February 15	"Oh, so THAT'S where Arkansas is."
55	Tennessee - 9	Steve Cohen (D)	42nd	March 1	"Thank you for taking time out from being a black woman to talk with me."
42	Kentucky - 3	John Yarmuth (D)	43rd	March 8	A debate over the subject of "throwing kittens through a woodchipper." Third congressman from December 12, 2006, segment to return for a profile.
47	Illinois - 17	Phil Hare (D)	44th	March 15	"It was wrong to break the law to get people out of slavery - that's what you just said." Fourth congressman from December 12, 2006, segment to return for a profile.
56	New York - 22	Maurice Hinchey (D)	45th	March 21	Has "brown acid-induced hallucinations" of Colbert with a horse's head.
57	Virginia - 11	Tom Davis (R)	46th	May 3	Includes a clip of Eleanor Holmes Norton concerning her relationship with Davis. Virginia's 11th is given a "#1 Ribbon" for being the wealthiest of the 435 districts.
58	Arizona - 7	Raúl Grijalva (D)	47th	May 24	"You are of Mexican descent. As a congressman, do you believe that you are doing a job that Americans don't want to do?". Debated over border control; asked Grijalva how much he charges for mustache rides.
59	Illinois - 9	Jan Schakowsky (D)	48th	June 4	"You are a Democrat, and therefore you are liberal. Are you high right now?" Interview "conducted" with clips from Schakowsky's appearance on the show five minutes earlier.
60	Washington - 9	Adam Smith (D)	49th	June 7	"Have you ever supported NAMBLA?" Colbert attempts to eat two hamburgers. The existence of shrink-rays was never confirmed nor denied.

=== Season 4 (2008) ===
#	District	Guest	Installment	Date aired	Notes
61	South Carolina - 4	Bob Inglis (R)	50th	January 30	
62	Pennsylvania - 7	Joe Sestak (D)	51st	April 22	
63	New York - 14	Carolyn B. Maloney (D)	52nd	July 29	

=== Season 5 (2009) ===
#	District	Guest	Installment	Date aired	Notes
64	Utah - 3	Jason Chaffetz (R)	53rd	January 6	Stephen shows his gun called Sweetness to Chaffetz. Ends interview with a leg wrestle that Stephen wins.
65	Wyoming - AL	Cynthia Lummis (R)	54th	March 9	The Fightin' Larges!
66	New York - 25	Dan Maffei (D)	55th	April 7	Features "evil twins" of Colbert and Maffei wearing goatees in the style of "evil Spock" in the Star Trek episode Mirror, Mirror. Colbert prompts Maffei's "evil twin" with statements about cocaine and prostitutes, similar to Robert Wexler's 2006 interview. Maffei, at Colbert's prompting to "look cool", attempts to shotgun a beer. At the end of the interview, Maffei and Colbert exchange the Vulcan salute.
67	Illinois - 18	Aaron Schock (R)	56th	April 15	
68	Maine - 1	Chellie Pingree (D)	57th	August 10	
69	Colorado - 2	Jared Polis (D)	58th	August 17	Called "Even Better-er Know a District," Colorado's 2nd district on Stephen's map is now green.
70	Delaware - AL	Mike Castle (R)	59th	November 9	
71	California - 12	Jackie Speier (D)	60th	November 17	Stephen stages a YouTube video which involves him and various members of Congress skating through the halls in the US House of Representatives.

=== Season 6 (2010) ===
#	District	Guest	Installment	Date aired	Notes
72	Illinois - 5	Mike Quigley (D)	61st	February 10	
73	Vancouver South	Ujjal Dosanjh (Liberal)	62nd	February 22	"Better Know a Riding" - First Member of Canadian Parliament to be interviewed.

=== Season 7 (2011) ===
#	District	Guest	Installment	Date aired	Notes
74	New York - 9	Yvette Clarke (D)	63rd	March 9	Stated that the Dutch held slaves in Brooklyn in 1898.
75	California - 10	John Garamendi (D)	64th	June 8	

=== Season 8 (2012) ===
#	District	Guest	Installment	Date aired	Notes
76	California - 8	Minority Leader; Nancy Pelosi (D)	65th	February 22	Agreed to encourage other House Democrats to appear in future installments of BKAD in exchange for Colbert's support of the DISCLOSE Act.
77	Missouri - 3	Russ Carnahan (D)	66th	August 2	
78	Minnesota - 5	Keith Ellison (D)	67th	August 9	
79	New York - 11	Yvette Clarke (D)	68th	September 4	

=== Season 9 (2013) ===
#	District	Guest	Installment	Date aired	Notes
80	Pennsylvania - 17	Matt Cartwright (D)	69th	April 25	Cartwright "taught" Colbert to ride a bike.
81	Maryland - 4	Donna Edwards (D)	70th	May 7	Colbert pretends to be an old lady constituent of Edwards who is upset at Obama for proposing cuts in Social Security. Maryland's 4th was featured twice, although with different representatives serving terms at the time of the features.
82	Wisconsin - 4	Gwen Moore (D)	71st	May 15	
83	Wisconsin - 2	Mark Pocan (D)	72nd	June 4	
84	New Jersey - 12	Rush D. Holt, Jr. (D)	73rd	August 12	
85	Michigan - 5	Dan Kildee (D)	74th	September 3	
86	Washington - 7	Jim McDermott (D)	75th	September 12	

=== Season 10 (2014) ===
#	District	Guest	Installment	Date aired	Notes
87	North Carolina - 1	G. K. Butterfield (D)	76th	March 24	Colbert initially sees Butterfield, who self-identifies as Black, as Caucasian. Colbert challenges Butterfield to distinguish between North Carolina and South Carolina BBQ.
88	California - 29	Tony Cárdenas (D)	77th	April 22	Colbert meets with Cárdenas, but mainly asks questions about the district's porn industry.
89	Virginia - 3	Bobby Scott (D)	78th	May 5	Colbert talks to Scott about government jobs, as the government is a major employer in Scott's district, and about rhymes in making crime fighting policy.
90	Ohio - 11	Marcia Fudge (D)	79th	August 26	Colbert talks with Fudge about the many things Cleveland has to offer, and sings her a rendition of his hit "Charlene (I'm Right Behind You)". He also challenges Fudge to a high-stakes fencing match.
91	California - 2	Jared Huffman (D)	80th	September 23	
92	Illinois - 8	Tammy Duckworth (D)	81st	October 8	
93	California - 13	Barbara Lee (D)	82nd	November 5	
94	Georgia - 1	Jack Kingston (R)	83rd (and final)	December 9	The final Better Know a District report, where Colbert re-interviews Jack Kingston, representative from the Georgia 1st district, as a tribute to his very first Better Know a District interview. Colbert and Representative Kingston participate in inane tasks around Washington, D.C., before being stopped and then joined by House Minority Leader, Nancy Pelosi. Colbert ends the segment with filling in all of the districts on the Better Know a District map, and is astonished when it turns out to be a map of the 48 Contiguous United States and Hawaii. Alaska is missing from the map.

== Spin-offs ==
=== Better Know a Challenger ===
In the months leading up to the 2006 congressional elections, Colbert interviewed the challengers in several House races. On several occasions he made clear that the challenger was interviewed because the incumbent declined to appear. However this was not always definitively the case. In these cases, the segment is known as "Better Know a Challenger," with different intro graphics.

After the segment, the district was colored on the "Better Know a District" map in goldenrod instead of amber, which is said to be the color all other districts are filled in with. It was upgraded to amber if the challenger won the 2006 election, or downgraded to cadmium yellow if they lost. Of course, it is nearly impossible to see the distinction between these shades on the map. Of the five challengers interviewed, only John Hall defeated an incumbent.

In the instance of New Jersey's 3rd congressional district, Colbert frequently referred to challenger Rich Sexton as representative Jim Saxton, a joke on the similarity of their names.

On May 8, 2014, Colbert resurrected the segment, interviewing Jack Rush who ran in the Florida 3rd district against incumbent Ted Yoho. In the interview, Colbert pretended that guns are people. Colbert also treated characters that Rush played in the past as real people.

=== Better Know a Protectorate ===
On March 16, 2006, Colbert introduced a four-part series entitled "Better Know a Protectorate", focusing on the protectorates (more correctly, unincorporated territories) of the United States (which send non-voting delegates to Congress). The formula is relatively the same as with "Better Know a District." Distinctive elements include Colbert attacking the member for their (non-)voting record, and feigning cultural ignorance. For the first segment, the same "Big Board" as BKAD was used, but was discontinued with the airing of the second segment. The United States Virgin Islands ("the fightin' virgins") was the protectorate that was covered and its delegate, Donna Christian-Christensen, was interviewed.

On April 26, 2007, Guam ("the fightin' Guam") was covered, including an interview with Madeleine Bordallo. A global map was used to produce the "Big Board", given Guam's distance from the continental United States. On August 7, 2007, American Samoa was featured ("the fightin' Samoa") and an interview with Eni Fa'aua'a Hunkin Faleomavaega, Jr. was shown.

The remaining protectorate is presumably Puerto Rico which has not been featured (the Northern Mariana Islands did not have a non-voting member as of the start of the series, although they received a seat after the 2008 elections).

=== Better Know a Founder ===
On March 1, 2006, Colbert introduced the "56-part" Better Know a Founder, an in-depth look at the signers of the Declaration of Independence. For this series John Trumbull's painting of The Declaration of Independence is used as the template for the "Big Board".

Using the same formula as Better Know a District, Colbert's first subject in the series was a spotlight of an interview with "Battlin'" Ben Franklin; the actor Ralph Archbold portrayed Franklin for the interview, with both he and Colbert wearing period clothing. Most of the hallmarks of the original segment remained, either in an altered form (e.g., King George: Great king, or the greatest king?) or unchanged (e.g., Colbert anachronistically asks Franklin if he had taken money from Jack Abramoff).

On November 15, 2006, the second installment of BKAF featured three actors portraying President Thomas Jefferson in an America's Next Top Model style segment, America's Top Jefferson, with Project Runway mentor and producer Tim Gunn making an appearance.

=== Better Know a President ===
On May 17, 2006, Colbert introduced Better Know a President, a 43-part series that would refresh the viewer's memory of the accomplishments of every president in United States history. The first president covered was Theodore Roosevelt, played by Roosevelt impersonator Jim Foote. In keeping with the running gags of the segment, he asked Roosevelt if the Spanish–American War was merely a great war of American imperialism, or the greatest war of American imperialism. The second covered was Thomas Jefferson. Colbert talked to three different Jefferson impersonators, and judged which was the best.

=== Meet an Ally ===
On August 3, 2006, Stephen began the first segment in a series entitled "Meet an Ally" in which he examines nations part of the "Coalition of the Willing". He began the series by interviewing the ambassador of Palau, Stuart Beck.

=== Betterer Know a District ===
When Colbert shows an extended segment of an interview at a later date, he calls the segment "Betterer Know a District".

=== Better Know a Memory ===
On November 8, 2006, some representatives who were profiled in Better Know a District and had since been re-elected in the previous day's election were reintroduced in a short segment that immediately preceded the commercial breaks. A humorous clip from the BKAD interview would be shown and the words "RETURNED TO CONGRESS" would be rubber stamped onto the still image of the representative. The subjects reintroduced were Eliot L. Engel, Brad Sherman, Lynn Westmoreland, and Robert Wexler.

=== Better Know a Governor ===
On January 21, 2008, after the Republican South Carolina Primary, Colbert interviewed Governor Mark Sanford as the easiest way to learn about all of South Carolinians.

=== Better Know a Lobby ===
On February 6, 2008, Colbert began what he called an "Infinite-long" segment called "Better Know a Lobbyist," where he interviews lobbyists. His first interview was with Joe Solmonese of the Human Rights Campaign, a gay rights organization. This was a two-part interview, with the second half being broadcast on February 7. On March 12, 2008, it changed to "Better Know a Lobby" and became a 35,000-part-long segment. The second interview was with Ethan Nadelmann of the Drug Policy Alliance, a lobby demanding the legalization of drugs. His third interview was with Paul Helmke of the Brady Campaign, a gun control lobby.

=== Better Know a Beatle ===
On January 28, 2009, Colbert began what he called the first of a four-part series "Better Know a Beatle", where Colbert intends to interview all of the Beatles starting with his interview with Paul McCartney, bass player, singer-songwriter of the Beatles. Colbert introduced Paul McCartney as "The Fightin' Walrus", a reference to two Beatle songs: "I Am the Walrus" and "Glass Onion".

=== Better Know a Cradle of Civilization ===
During his trip to Iraq, Colbert began his one-part series, Better Know a Cradle of Civilization, during which he explained the history of Iraq.

=== Better Know a Stephen ===
On December 16, 2009, Colbert began a new segment in which he interviews other prominent men named Stephen (specifically spelled with a "ph"). He started off by interviewing Stephen King.

=== Better Know a Riding ===
On February 22, 2010, Colbert began his one-part series, Better Know a Riding, during his coverage of the 2010 Winter Olympics. The featured riding (a riding is an electoral district in Canada) was Vancouver South, represented by Ujjal Dosanjh.

=== Better Know a Kissinger ===
One part series on Henry Kissinger prior to Colbert's interview of Henry Kissinger.

=== Better Know a Salinger ===
During the second edition of c'O'lbert Book Club, centered around J.D. Salinger, Colbert profiled the author in 'part one of my one-part series, Better Know a Salinger'. The first and only issue was based on the Fighting J.D.

=== Better Know a Hemingway ===
Third edition of Colbert Book Club features this "part one of a one-part series".

=== Better Know a America ===
On December 8, 2014, while hosting the show in Washington, D.C., Colbert debuted another one-part series, Better Know a America [sic].
