= List of The Colbert Report episodes (2008) =

- No. of episodes: 160

Release
- Original network: Comedy Central

Season chronology
- ← Previous; 2007 episodes Next → 2009 episodes

This is a list of episodes for The Colbert Report in 2008.

== 2008 ==
=== January ===
Due to the writers strike, the show went on hiatus on November 5, 2007. The show returned on January 7, 2008, without writers. The writers started again on February 13, 2008.

No.	"The Wørd"	Guest(s)	Introductory phrase	Original release date	Prod. code
332	"(left blank)"	Andrew Sullivan, Richard Freeman	"Tonight... Then... Plus... Hey. This is The Colber-t Repor-t."	January 7	4001
After a lengthy two-minute round of applause, though cut out in later episodes, Stephen complains that there are no words in his teleprompter, referencing the writers strike. He then discusses Mike Huckabee winning the 2008 Iowa Republican caucus, and how Huckabee has offered him the position as Vice President of the United States on numerous occasions. Next, he compares the different crowds that Hillary Clinton, Barack Obama and Huckabee draw at their campaign speeches. He again challenges Obama to a "grit-off," and attacks him for saying he'd talk to Syria and Iran, but not him, as Obama stated that he would not cross the WGA picket lines. Stephen then talks about the writers strike and plays old clips of himself denigrating labor unions. Next, Stephen interviews Andrew Sullivan about the upcoming U.S. presidential election. Finally, Stephen interviews Richard Freeman about labor unions. The show runs 5 minutes longer than usual.
333	"None"	Chris Beam, Gary Rosen	None (show begins with opening sequence)	January 8	4002
Stephen begins by discussing GM's self-driving car. He then gets dismayed over the writers strike, takes his glasses off and starts sobbing. While reaching for a box of tissues under his desk, he finds his house keys, a lost Mozart sonata, Amelia Earhart's skull, and a previously written script of the show from October 29, 2007. He then reads from the script, which deals with the economy and meteorites. Next, Stephen interviews Chris Beam of Slate about the New Hampshire presidential primary. Finally, he interviews Gary Rosen of Commentary about his political views.
334	"None"	Mike Huckabee, Matt Taibbi	None (show begins with opening sequence)	January 9	4003
Stephen mentions Ellen DeGeneres winning a People's Choice Award and dances with the crowd in jubilation. He also mentions Will Smith becoming a Scientologist. He then discusses the results of the New Hampshire primaries. Stephen complains that Hillary Clinton's victory in New Hampshire was a vote against the pollsters, who predicted Barack Obama would win. He then interviews Mike Huckabee about his presidential campaign. Next, Stephen interviews Matt Taibbi about the New Hampshire primary. He then finishes by trying to figure out who set the studio on fire, a segment that was originally scheduled to air on October 3, 2007.
335	"None"	Norman Ornstein, Muhammad Yunus	None (show begins with opening sequence)	January 10	4004
Stephen briefly mentions John Kerry's endorsement of Barack Obama. In the "Un-American News" segment, Stephen discusses foreign newspapers' coverage of the New Hampshire primary. He then interviews Norman Ornstein about how difficult it is to actually change the politics of Washington, D.C. Next, he chronicles his attempt to get his portrait into the Smithsonian Institution, in Part 1 of "National Treasure: Portrait of Stephen." Finally, Stephen interviews Muhammad Yunus about poverty and microcredit.
336	"None"	Neil Shubin	None (show begins with opening sequence)	January 14	4005
Stephen discusses the writers strike and Bill O'Reilly's comments about Stephen's performance without writers. In "Around The World In 11.6 Seconds," he briefly mentions Italy, Ecuador, the West Bank, Germany and Kenya. In Indecison 2008: Don't F%#k This Up America, Stephen talks about the recent Republican presidential debate in South Carolina, focusing mostly on Fred Thompson. This leads to the "Sam Waterston Says Things You Should Never Believe In A Trustworthy Manner" segment. Next, Part 2 of "National Treasure: Portrait of Stephen." Finally, Stephen interviews Neil Shubin about evolution.
337	"None"	Peter Hopkins, Jared Cohen	None (show begins with opening sequence)	January 15	4006
Stephen begins with "Who's Riding My Coattails Now?" and chastises Fred Claus and bigthink.com. He then interviews Peter Hopkins, co-founder of that website. After Part 3 of "National Treasure: Portrait of Stephen," he announces that his portrait will be on display at the National Portrait Gallery by the 2nd floor bathrooms for the next six weeks. Finally, Stephen interviews Jared Cohen about his experiences in the Middle East.
338	"None"	Benjamin Eckstein, Deborah Tannen	None (show begins with opening sequence)	January 16	4007
Stephen discusses the results of the Michigan Democratic primary and the Michigan Republican primary. He also talks about the Democratic presidential debate in Nevada. Stephen then interviews oddsmaker Benjamin Eckstein about each candidate's chances of winning the Nevada Democratic caucus. He spins a roulette wheel to decide who will win, and Barack Obama is declared the winner. Next, Stephen chastises Conan O'Brien's claim that O'Brien made Mike Huckabee the winner of the Iowa Republican caucus. Finally, Stephen interviews Deborah Tannen about the language of women, as well as Hillary Clinton's potential struggles as a female presidential candidate.
339	"None"	Benjamin Eckstein, Lou Dobbs (old footage), David Levy	None (show begins with opening sequence)	January 17	4008
Stephen begins by interviewing Benjamin Eckstein again, this time about the Nevada Republican caucus. The roulette wheel makes another appearance, and it chooses Mike Huckabee (with Stephen's help). In the "Colberto Reporto Gigante," Esteban Colberto "interviews" Lou Dobbs. The interview mixes clips of Dobbs' interview with Stephen on January 24, 2007, with Stephen's previous questions, asked in Spanish by Esteban. Finally, Stephen interviews David Levy about his book, Love and Sex with Robots.
340	"None"	Allan Sloan, Eric Weiner	None (show begins with opening sequence)	January 21	4009
Stephen discusses the results of the Nevada Democratic caucus, incorrectly claiming he called the victory for Hillary Clinton last week. He also discusses Mitt Romney's win in the Nevada Republican caucus, as well as Mike Huckabee's and Fred Thompson's concession speeches in the South Carolina Republican primary. This leads to "Sam Waterston Says Things You Should Never Believe In A Trustworthy Manner." Stephen then interviews Allan Sloan about the prospects of a recession. In the first "Better Know A Governor" segment, Stephen gets to know the Governor of South Carolina, Mark Sanford. Finally, Stephen interviews Eric Weiner about his book, The Geography of Bliss.
341	"None"	Malcolm Gladwell, Andrew Young	None (show begins with opening sequence)	January 22	4010
Stephen briefly mentions today's drop of the Dow Jones Industrial Average. He then discusses last night's South Carolina Democratic debate, as well as Mitt Romney's singing of "Who Let the Dogs Out?" Next, he interviews Malcolm Gladwell about IQ tests. He then presents a report on the 1969 Charleston, South Carolina Hospital Workers' Strike. He interviews Andrew Young about the strike and his role in it. Finally, Stephen, Young, Gladwell and the Harlem Gospel Choir sing "Go Down Moses," and Stephen dedicates the performance to his striking writers.
342	"None"	Marie Wood, Jeb Corliss, Andrew McLean	None (show begins with opening sequence)	January 23	4011
Stephen discusses Fred Thompson dropping out of the U.S. presidential election. This leads to "Sam Waterston Says Things You Should Never Believe In A Trustworthy Manner." He then dedicates the remainder of the show to the "Sport Report." He begins by talking about reports of New England Patriots quarterback Tom Brady injuring his ankle. He then encourages people to buy his WristStrong bracelets and send them to Brady. Next, Stephen interviews Marie Wood about the Yellow Ribbon Fund. He then interviews Jeb Corliss about his attempted jump off the Empire State Building. Finally, Stephen interviews Andrew McLean about extreme skiing.
343	"None"	Debra Dickerson, Charles Nesson	None (show begins with opening sequence)	January 24	4012
Stephen briefly mentions Dennis Kucinich dropping out of the U.S. presidential election. He then discusses Rudy Giuliani's presidential campaign in the Florida Republican primary. Next, he claims that Frederick Douglass is Hillary Clinton's "new black friend." He also comments on Bill Clinton's attacks on Barack Obama. Stephen then interviews Debra Dickerson about the role of race and gender in politics. Next, Stephen shows footage of the South Carolina Democratic debate and, using a sand sculpture of Hillary Clinton, Barack Obama and John Edwards, decides who won. Finally, Stephen interviews Charles Nesson about why online poker should be legal.
344	"None"	Marjane Satrapi, Rick Warren	None (show begins with opening sequence)	January 28	4013
Stephen discusses Barack Obama's victory in the South Carolina Democratic primary and his endorsement by Ted Kennedy. He then compares Obama to John F. Kennedy. He then talks about the death of Gordon B. Hinckley and claims he was killed by his striking writers. Stephen then discusses Iranian president Mahmoud Ahmadinejad's upcoming visit to Iraq. He then interviews Marjane Satrapi about her experiences growing up in [ran. Next, Stephen discusses an article in The Nation that claims the South Carolina Democratic primary results could have been different if he had been allowed on the ballot, and shows previously aired clips of his campaign stops in the state. Finally, Stephen interviews Rick Warren about God and the meaning of life.
345	"None"	Joe Quesada, Jon Stewart, Alex Ross	None (show begins with opening sequence)	January 29	4014
Stephen begins with an arts and crafts demonstration, saying that selling "googly-eyed clams" would be a great way to make money if you lost your job. He then briefly mentions President Bush's final State of the Union Address. Next, Stephen interviews Joe Quesada about the new Captain America. He then discusses his feud with Conan O'Brien. Jon Stewart makes an appearance to tell Stephen that while O'Brien "made" Mike Huckabee, Stewart "made" O'Brien, and therefore "made" Huckabee. Finally, Stephen interviews Alex Ross about classical music in the 20th century.
346	"None"	Carl Hiaasen, Frans de Waal	None (show begins with opening sequence)	January 30	4015
Stephen mentions John Edwards dropping out of the presidential election. He then discusses Hillary Clinton getting the most votes in the Florida Democratic primary, and John McCain winning the Florida Republican primary. He also talks about Rudy Giuliani dropping out of the presidential election. Stephen then interviews Carl Hiaasen about politics in Florida. In the "Better Know A District" segment, he profiles South Carolina's 4th congressional district. Finally, Stephen interviews Frans de Waal about the relationship between humans and apes.
347	"None"	Tim Harford, Andrew Napolitano	None (show begins with opening sequence)	January 31	4016
Stephen discusses the previous night's Republican presidential debate. He then interviews Tim Harford about logic. In the "People Destroying America" segment, Stephen profiles Lowell Kuvin, a resident of Coral Gables, Florida, who wants to park his truck on the street overnight. Finally, Stephen interviews Andrew Napolitano about his new book, A Nation Of Sheep.

=== February ===
No.	"The Wørd"	Guest(s)	Introductory phrase	Original release date	Prod. code
348	"None"	Jon Stewart, Conan O'Brien, Tony Campolo, Jacob Weisberg	None (show begins with opening sequence)	February 4	4017
Stephen talks about John McCain's rise in the polls, and jokes that since the media has said that a vote for Mike Huckabee is a vote for McCain, and Stephen is Huckabee's "running mate," then Stephen is really John McCain. He is soon interrupted by Jon Stewart and Conan O'Brien, who left the set of The Daily Show to continue their fight. After some playful attacks, Stephen gets them to leave and continues the show. He interviews Tony Campolo, an Evangelical Democrat, about his book on faith and politics. Next, Stephen interviews Jacob Weisberg about his book, The Bush Tragedy. At the end of the show, Stephen and Jon find that Conan has already left, so they go to confront him on Late Night with Conan O'Brien.
349	"None"	Angelo Falcon, Bob Dole	None (show begins with opening sequence)	February 5	4018
Stephen talks about Super Tuesday, discussing the best way for the Republicans to choose the most Reagan-like candidate and about Hillary Clinton being the most likely to withstand Republican attacks. He then interviews Angelo Falcon about the Latino vote. Stephen then talks about what he considers to be more light-hearted subjects, including waterboarding. He finally interviews Bob Dole about the elections.
350	"None"	Richard Brookhiser, Joe Solmonese, Tad Devine	None (show begins with opening sequence)	February 6	4019
Stephen begins by talking about the results for Super Tuesday. He claims that due to Barack Obama winning states with large white populations, the only way that Hillary Clinton can win is by suppressing the white vote. He then interviews Richard Brookhiser about the Republican vote. He then introduces a new segment, "Better Know a Lobbyist," and interviews Joe Solmonese from the Human Rights Campaign about gay rights. Finally, Stephen interviews Tad Devine about superdelegates and the Democratic vote.
351	"None"	Mike Huckabee, Joe Solmonese, Mark Moffett	None (show begins with opening sequence)	February 7	4020
Stephen introduces his "Stephen Colbert's 3rd Annual Ethnic Minute" (although it is the first time he has done it). He combines Black History Month with Chinese New Year to celebrate "Black Chinese History New Year Month Minute" and claims the best Black Chinese American to celebrate is Worf from Star Trek: The Next Generation. Mike Huckabee then appears, claiming he still has a chance of become the Republican candidate in the next presidential election. Stephen continues his "Better Know a Lobbyist" interview with Joe Solmonese which started in the previous episode. He then talks to Mark Moffett about frogs.
352	"None"	Aubrey de Gray, Marc Pachter, Philip Zimbardo	None (show begins with opening sequence)	February 11	4021
Stephen begins with congratulating Barack Obama winning a Grammy award for "Best Spoken Word Album" for The Audacity of Hope: Thoughts on Reclaiming the American Dream. He then talks about Mitt Romney dropping out of the race for President. He then interviews Aubrey de Gray about defeating aging and trying to make John McCain young. Stephen then talks about his portrait to Marc Pachter (over the telephone). Pachter tells him that the portrait has increased the number of visitors to the museum and that it will now be displayed in the National Portrait Gallery until April 1. He then interviews Philip Zimbardo about "The Lucifer Effect" and how people become evil.
353	"None"	Eliot Spitzer, Eleanor Holmes Norton, Lisa Randall	None (show begins with opening sequence)	February 12	4022
Stephen begins with a discussion on Mike Huckabee's running mate. Stephen claims that via obligation, he should be the running mate. He also displays his dislike of John McCain, due to other right-wing political pundits, such as Rush Limbaugh, disliking McCain. He then talks to superdelegate Eliot Spitzer about superdelegates. He then talks to Eleanor Holmes Norton, another superdelegate, about her support of Barack Obama. Finally, Stephen interviews Lisa Randall about other dimensions.
354	"None"	David Gracer, Neil deGrasse Tyson, Richard Thompson Ford	"Our writers are back and they are sexy. (Aside) Who wrote this?"	February 13	4023
Stephen begins by talking about how he survived the writers strike. He brings his writers (including, strangely enough, former NFL runningback Tiki Barber, actor/dancer Mikhail Baryshnikov, journalist Judith Miller, actor Kevin Bacon, and Mr. Met) onto the set and welcomes them back personally. He then interviews David Gracer about eating insects. Stephen then introduces a new segment, "Stephen Colbert's Fallback Position," where he investigates different jobs he may take if he loses his job as a pundit. He investigates becoming an astrophysicist with Neil deGrasse Tyson. Finally, he interviews Richard Thompson Ford about the Democrats, and how he thinks the "race card" is being played too often.
355	"None"	John Feinstein, Leonard Nimoy	"Hey Cupid, put on some damn pants! No one wants to see baby bits! This is The Colbert Report."	February 14	4024
Stephen begins with "Who's Riding My Coattails Now?," putting German comedian Oliver Pocher on notice for stealing his pose that he used on the front cover of GQ magazine. He then talks about the Roger Clemens hearing. He then interviews John Feinstein about the use of steroids in sports. In the "People Destroying America" segment, Stephen talks about Susan Pagan, who refused to give her daughter a free Happy Meal for getting good grades. Finally, he interviews Leonard Nimoy about his new book.
356	"Good Bad Journalism"	Henry Louis Gates Jr.	"Hey Obama, try to plagiarize this: This is The Colbert Report."	February 26	4025
Stephen starts by talking about a photo of Barack Obama in native Kenyan clothes, claiming he is a terrorist. He then discusses a New York Times article about the John McCain lobbyist controversy. In the "Oscars That Are Destroying America" segment, he attacks the fact that too many awards went to foreigners. Finally, Stephen interviews Henry Louis Gates Jr. about race.
357	"None"	Tony Snow	"Hey, alternating current. Why don't you just admit you're bi. This is The Colbert Report."	February 27	4026
Stephen begins by discussing a recent John McCain rally, in which opening speaker Bill Cunningham said negative things about Barack Obama. The "Threatdown:" 5. Monopoly! 4. Richard Branson! 3. Bankruptcy! 2. John McCain! 1. Starbucks! He then talks about all Starbucks locations closing for three hours to re-train employees. Finally, Stephen interviews Tony Snow about his experience as White House Press Secretary.
358	"None"	Richard Brookhiser, Ingrid Newkirk	"Hey, Ben Bernanke. Stop telling us about your sagging growth. This is The Colbert Report."	February 28	4027
Stephen talks angrily about his image being used on a Russian billboard, demanding payment from the Russians. In his "Cold War Update", he talks about Kosovo, Cuba, and the shooting of a satellite. He then talks to Richard Brookhiser about the death of William F. Buckley Jr. Stephen then interviews Ingrid Newkirk about animal rights.

=== March ===
No.	"The Wørd"	Guest(s)	Introductory phrase	Original release date	Prod. code
359	"None"	Lorin Maazel, Shashi Tharoor	"If it looks like a duck and it quacks like a duck, it could be a terrorist. Shoot it either way. This is The Colbert Report."	March 3	4028
Stephen starts by talking about the Colbert Bump and how it has been proven to benefit people who appear on his show. He points out a Los Angeles Times op-ed by James H. Fowler that summarizes research showing that Democratic candidates who come on the show receive 44% more in campaign donations. He then begins a new segment called, "Das Booty – The Hunt for Hitler's Gold," in which he claims he will attempt to find two tons of Nazi gold. He then interviews Lorin Maazel about playing music in North Korea. Finally, Stephen interviews Shashi Tharoor about technology in India.
360	"Experience"	William Donohue, Howard Dean, Jennifer 8. Lee	"I'm no fan of March Madness, but it sure beats February syphilis. This is The Colbert Report.	March 4	4029
Stephen starts by talking about John McCain and his support from John Hagee. Stephen expresses his anger of Hagee's views about Catholics. However, as a Christian, he is forced to turn the other cheek. Therefore, Stephen gets William Donohue to express his anger for him. In "The Wørd," he talks about McCain's continued claims of experience, but only over certain things. Next, Howard Dean calls Stephen to talk about the primaries. In "Nailed 'Em," he talks about a six-year-old girl who was cited for vandalism after drawing on the pavement in front of her front door with chalk. Finally, Stephen interviews Jennifer 8. Lee about Chinese food.
361	"None"	Robert Reich, Gregory Rodriguez	"Forget the wind. The answer, my friend, is blowin' out my mouth. This is The Colbert Report."	March 5	4030
Stephen begins by paying tribute to Brett Favre. He then becomes angry about Mike Huckabee losing the Republican primaries to John McCain. He then interviews Robert Reich about the Democrats. In "Difference Makers," Stephen interviews Jason Grunstra, a man who created a website which gives away free breast implants. He then interviews Gregory Rodriguez about race relations and Mexican immigration. Finally, he pays tribute to Gary Gygax.
362	"AT & Treason"	John Legend	"Daylight Savings Time [sic?] starts Sunday. Maybe that'll get us out of this daylight debt crisis. This is The Colbert Report."	March 6	4031
Stephen talks about John McCain, and about him having a hot dog lunch with George W. Bush. In "The Wørd," he claims that phone companies should be allowed to tap phone calls. In "Cheating Death with Dr. Stephen T. Colbert, DFA," Stephen talks about surgery and heart health. He then interviews John Legend about his music and his support for Barack Obama. Finally, Stephen sings "The Girl Is Mine" with Legend.
363	"Size Matters"	George McGovern	"New York Post, I call dibs on 'Eliot Mess.' This is The Colbert Report."	March 10	4032
Stephen begins by talking about the Eliot Spitzer scandal. In "The Wørd," he talks about Hillary Clinton's claim that she is ahead in the Democratic primaries because she was won bigger states. Stephen then presents a special repor-t called, "The '72 Democrats: Alone Again Naturally" covering the history of the 1972 Democratic presidential race. Stephen makes clear his dislike of George McGovern, whom he then interviews. This episode marks the first appearance of the phrase "President Bush Have a Hot Dog With Me" in the opening titles.
364	"Mr. Right Now"	Geraldo Rivera	"Hey blood bank, that cookie sucked. I want my blood back. This is The Colbert Report."	March 11	4033
Stephen talks about his hate for John McCain, which he is forced to set aside to support him as the Republican presidential nominee. In "The Wørd," Stephen explains how McCain is like a boyfriend who the country could get used to after getting to know him better. In the "Colbert Platinum" segment, he talks about fake Ferraris and the destruction of homes in Liechtenstein. Finally, Stephen interviews Geraldo Rivera about his new book, His Panic.
365	"None"	Ethan Nadelmann, Howard Kurtz	"If I had a nickel for every time I was wrong, I'd be broke. This is The Colbert Report."	March 12	4034
Stephen begins by talking about the resignation of Eliot Spitzer. In "Smokin' Pole: The Fight For Arctic Riches," Stephen talks about Alaska and how it may help America gain more control of the Arctic. In "Better Know A Lobby," he talks about the drug lobby and interviews Ethan Nadelmann of the Drug Policy Alliance. Finally, Stephen interviews Howard Kurtz about the media.
366	"None"	Hussein Ibish, Sudhir Venkatesh	"Hey Burger King, isn't it time you named an heir? This is The Colbert Report."	March 13	4035
Stephen discusses the settlement in a lawsuit filed against Airborne. He then introduces a new segment, "Democralypse Now: The Delightful Dismemberment Of The Democratic Hopescape," which focuses on Geraldine Ferraro's recent comments about Barack Obama, as well as baseless claims that Obama is a Muslim. He then interviews Hussein Ibish about those claims. In the "Difference Makers" segment, Stephen profiles Tennessee Senator Doug Jackson about his legislation that would allow guns in bars. Finally, Stephen interviews Sudhir Venkatesh about his sociological experiences with gangs.
367	"The Audacity Of Hopelessness"	Samantha Power	"If you're filling out your tournament brackets, I always go with "C." This is The Colbert Report."	March 17	4036
Stephen begins by talking about the Democratic primary in Pennsylvania. Stephen then announces The Colbert Report will be taped in Philadelphia, Pennsylvania between April 14–17. In "The Wørd," he claims that the best way to lower unemployment figures is for those who have no jobs to stop looking for work. In "People Destroying America," Stephen talks about a bar owner in New York who banned the song "Danny Boy" from his bar. Finally, he interviews Samantha Power about the Democrats and her book about Sergio Vieira de Mello.
368	"None"	Kareem Abdul-Jabbar, Carole King	"If you're just waking up, that's how you celebrate St. Patrick's Day. This is The Colbert Report."	March 18	4037
Stephen begins by talking about Reverend Jeremiah Wright's remarks about racism and how Barack Obama reacted. He then talks about his upcoming shows in Philadelphia and press rumors that he is restarting his presidential campaign. He denies this and announces his new segment, "Stephen Colbert's Doritos Spicy Sweet Pennsylvania Primary Coverage Live from Chilidelphia: The City of Brotherly Crunch." In "Das Booty: The Hunt for Hitler's Gold," Stephen discusses the rising price of gold. Due to a previous search for Hitler's gold being canceled, Stephen sends Kareem Abdul-Jabbar (believing he is his stage manager) to find it. He then interviews Carole King about her music career. Finally, King sings "I Feel the Earth Move."
369	"The Gospel of John"	Dee Dee Myers	"Hey Stephen, don't forget to stop thinking out loud. This is The Colbert Report."	March 19	4038
Stephen briefly mentions David Paterson, New York's newly installed governor, who admitted to an extramarital affair. In the "Democralypse Now" segment, he discusses Hillary Clinton supporters boycotting the Daily Kos and Barack Obama's speech on race. Next, in "Stephen Colbert's Doritos Spicy Sweet Pennsylvania Primary Coverage Live from Chilidelphia: The City of Brotherly Crunch," he features Donorschoose.org. In the "Tip of the Hat, Wag of the Finger" segment, Stephen wags his finger at the troops in Afghanistan and tips his hat to The Moment of Truth. Finally, Stephen interviews Dee Dee Myers about her new book, Why Women Should Rule The World.
370	"None"	Dean Kamen	None (show begins with opening sequence)	March 20	4039
Stephen talks about World Water Day, which leads to a special repor-t, "Watershift Down: Getting The Sea Monkey Off Of America's Aqua-back." He then introduces a new bottled water, Aqua Colbert. Next, he visits the American Museum of Natural History and their "H_{2}O=Life" exhibit. Stephen then interviews Dean Kamen about a potential water crisis and his invention that purifies water. Finally, he briefly mentions John Kanzius, who discovered a way to burn salt water.
371	"None"	Eric Alterman, Michael Reynolds	"We have a really big show tonight, but it's a little sensitive, so call it 'husky.' This is The Colbert Report."	March 31	4040
Stephen starts by talking about the start of the new baseball season, and claims that some of the people involved in rioting in Iraq were Chicago Cubs fans. He then talks about Philadelphia, claiming he has been studying the city's history and then moves onto "Stephen Colbert's Doritos Spicy Sweet Pennsylvania Primary Coverage Live from Chilidelphia: The City of Brotherly Crunch." He then mentions that Barack Obama scored 37 (out of 300) in a bowling game. Next, he interviews Eric Alterman about liberalism. Stephen then broadcasts a repeat of the seventh Tek Jansen episode, announcing that a new episode will be shown on April 3. Finally, he interviews Michael Reynolds about building houses out of garbage.

=== April ===
No.	"The Wørd"	Guest(s)	Introductory phrase	Original release date	Prod. code
372	"Pick Sicks"	Brent Glass, Van Jones	"I never proofread my scripts so I have more time to bring you the turth. This is The Colbert Report."	April 1	4041
Stephen first talks about his portrait, which was taken down from the National Portrait Gallery. He then gets a call from his Atone-Phone from Brent Glass, who says that the National Treasure's Exhibit at the Smithsonian will host the portrait until April 13. In "The Wørd", he talks about Oregon using a lottery system to give people health insurance. In "Stephen Colbert's Bears and Balls", Colbert talks the subprime mortgage crisis and rats that are able to use little plastic rakes. He then interviews Van Jones about green collar jobs.
373	"None"	R.E.M.	"I don't need a GPS system to find the truth, but I would like a free GPS system. (winks) This is The Colbert Report."	April 2	4042
Stephen begins by announcing that he has won a Peabody Award. The Summer Travel Edition of the "Threatdown:" 5. Pussies! 4. Nipples! 3. Pilots! 2. Birds! (includes a rare Threatdown "Wag of the Finger" to Richard Branson) 1. Limey Baggage Handlers! Next, Stephen interviews R.E.M. about their new album, Accelerate, as well as politics and their history. Finally, R.E.M. performs their newest single, "Supernatural Superserious".
374	"Let The Games Begin"	Clay Shirky	"It's not a recession, it's a correction. Correction, it's a recession. This is The Colbert Report."	April 3	4043
Stephen talks about his Peabody Award and claims that the award should be shared between him and Doritos. In "The Wørd", Stephen says that the 2008 Beijing Olympics are too important to boycott. He then shows the eighth episode of Tek Jansen. He then interviews Clay Shirky about the internet. Finally, Jason Baker, one of The Colbert Report's editors, performs the song "You Are the Best", which featured in the Tek Jansen episode.
375	"None"	Trevor Paglen, Jesse Ventura	"Remember the '80s? Then you're not part of my demographic. This is The Colbert Report."	April 7	4044
Stephen begins by mourning the passing of Charlton Heston. He then discusses an interview with Ted Turner in which Turner claimed that, due to global heating, people will turn to cannibalism. He then goes on to talk about Black ops and interviews Trevor Paglen, who has written a book on the subject. In "Democralypse Now," Stephen talks about the resignation of Mark Penn and Hillary Clinton's attempt to attack John McCain. Finally, he interviews Jesse Ventura about his book, Don't Start the Revolution Without Me.
376	"None"	Madeleine Albright	"Sticks and stones may break my bones, but words will never hurt me...unless you throw a dictionary at me. This is The Colbert Report."	April 8	4045
Stephen talks about Pope Benedict XVI visiting New York and he tries to tempt the Pope to come on the show. He then talks about his donorschoose.org campaign. Next, he shows some drawings of the presidential candidates, done by children in Pennsylvania schools. Stephen then goes on to talk about Wilford Brimley backing John McCain in the presidential race, and plays a phone call between "Brimley" and himself. Finally, Stephen interviews Madeleine Albright about her book, Memo to the President Elect.
377	"Starter Country"	Jeff Gore	"There are eight million stories in the Naked City; most would look better with their clothes on. This is The Colbert Report."	April 9	4046
Stephen starts by talking about the Olympic Flame relay, believing that Tibetan monks are being bullies and that the Flame is suffering the worst. In "The Wørd," he talks about the record donations being made to the Democratic Party and claims that it would be better for them to buy their own country. In "Cheating Death with Dr. Stephen T. Colbert, D.F.A.," he covers living older, sexual health and surgery. Finally, he interviews Jeff Gore about retiring the penny.
378	"Black and White"	Robin Wright	"At the sound of the tone, the time will be 'tone time.' BEEP! This is The Colbert Report."	April 10	4047
Stephen begins by mentioning General Petraeus' testimony to Congress. He then discusses next week's shows being taped in Philadelphia, Pennsylvania and shows more drawings of the presidential candidates, done by children in Pennsylvania schools. Stephen then talks about the "Santa Clausification" of Martin Luther King Jr. In "Tip of the Hat, Wag of the Finger," he wags his finger at talking fish, tips his hat to the black drum and wags his finger to Time's Time 100. Finally, Stephen interviews Robin Wright about the future of the Middle East.
379	"None"	John Legend, Michael Nutter, Chris Matthews	None (show opens with Stephen and John Legend singing "The Star-Spangled Banner")	April 14	4048
Taped in Philadelphia, the program is introduced by a Benjamin Franklin impersonator. Stephen talks about his new set, which includes a giant map of Pennsylvania. Stephen then talks about the Pennsylvania Democratic primary and what has led up to it. He then interviews Michael Nutter, the mayor of Philadelphia, about violence in the city and his policy on guns. Finally, Stephen interviews Chris Matthews about the upcoming primary. The word that appears next to Stephen in the opening credits changes to SELF-EVIDENT.
380	"Tradition"	The Roots, Michelle Obama	"This is The Colbert Report and these are The Roots." (The Roots perform the opening music.)	April 15	4049
Taped in Philadelphia, the show begins with Stephen talking to a Benjamin Franklin impersonator.. In "The Wørd," he talks about Barack Obama's recent comments on why Americans who live in small towns may be "bitter." He then shows footage of his tour of Philadelphia. Next, Stephen interviews Michelle Obama about her husband's presidential campaign. Finally, The Roots perform "The Star-Spangled Banner."
381	"None"	Philadelphia Eagles cheerleaders, Ed Rendell	(after cheerleaders spell out TRUTH) "I knew it! This is The Colbert Report."	April 16	4050
The episode begins with the Philadelphia Eagles cheerleaders spelling "Truth" and performing to the show's theme tune. Stephen talks about Pope Benedict XVI's visit to America. In "Democralypse Now," he talks about Bruce Springsteen endorsing Barack Obama. Stephen then shows more footage of his tour of Philadelphia, visiting the National Constitution Center. Finally, he interviews Ed Rendell about Pennsylvania.
382	"Valued Voter (presented as "Ed Wørds" by John Edwards)"	Hillary Clinton, Patrick Murphy, John Edwards, Barack Obama	None (show begins with opening sequence)	April 17	4051
At the top of the show, the screen behind Stephen goes out suddenly, until Hillary Clinton comes out and helps fix it. Stephen then talks about the ABC News Democratic debate. Stephen interviews Patrick Murphy about his time serving in Iraq. Next, John Edwards delivers "Ed Wørds," explaining how white men are the key voters in the upcoming primaries, and how he still isn't sure who he will endorse for president. Finally, Barack Obama appears via satellite and declares political distractions on notice.
383	"None"	James Martin, Bernie Sanders	"If I learned one thing from the Liberty Bell, it's that crack is wack. Stay in school, kids. This is The Colbert Report."	April 21	4052
Stephen starts by talking about his visit to Philadelphia. He then talks about food shortages and predicts that cannibalism will grow in ten years time. Stephen then talks about Pope Benedict XVI's visit to the United States with James Martin. He then interviews Bernie Sanders about socialism. The show finished with Stephen eating his stage manager Bobby. "PRESIDENT BUSH HAVE A HOTDOG WITH ME" returns as the word next to Stephen in the opening credits.
384	"None"	Susan Jacoby	"You say tom-ah-to, I say this is The Colbert Report."	April 22	4053
Stephen begins by talking about Earth Day. He then moves on to coverage of the Pennsylvania Democratic primary and The Colbert Report's coverage of it. Stephen talks about the accusations that Barack Obama copied Hillary Clinton in terms of appearing on his show, and claims that Obama has copied Clinton in other ways. In "Better Know a District," Stephen interviews Joe Sestak from Pennsylvania's 7th district. Finally, he interviews Susan Jacoby on anti-intellectualism.
385	"Iraq The Vote"	Mitch Albom	"Nation, I'm really under the gun. Seriously, I stashed a pistol under my toupée. This is The Colbert Report."	April 23	4054
Stephen starts by talking about the Time 100 and attacking Rain, who is still ahead of him in the poll. In "The Wørd," he talks about the results of the Pennsylvania Democratic primary. In "Colbert Platinum," he talks about underwater convertibles, buying the remains of dinosaurs, and Caffé Raro, the most-expensive coffee in the world. Stephen then interviews Mitch Albom about his books. He ends by talking about "The Lost O'Reilly Tapes," which he claims is two minutes of lost footage from his interview with Bill O'Reilly.
386	"None"	Maria Shriver	"The truth shall set you free, unless you killed somebody, in which case, remember, tell the cops they were breathing when you left. This is The Colbert Report."	April 24	4055
Stephen begins by discussing General Petraeus' promotion to chief of United States Central Command. The "Threatdown:" 5. Little League! 4. Bulls! 3. Bees! 2. Rationing! 1. Bears! In the "Difference Makers" segment, Stephen profiles a man in Atlanta, Georgia who invented a "Bumbot", designed to chase away bums. Finally, Stephen interviews Maria Shriver about her new book, Just Who Will You Be?
387	"Kernel of Truth"	Feist	"A great man once said, 'This is The Colbert Report.' Wait, that was me. This is The Colbert Report!"	April 28	4056
Stephen begins by talking about Vanity Fair's photo shoot of Miley Cyrus. He then talks about Howard Dean's belief that the choice for the Democratic presidential nomination will not be based on the popular vote. In "The Wørd," Stephen talks about using ethanol to help fight climate change. In "Stephen Colbert's Sport Report," he talks about lumberjack sports. Stephen then talks to Feist about her career. Finally, she performs her latest single, "I Feel It All."
388	"Separation of Church & Plate"	Anne Lamott	"How do you get to Carnegie Hall? Limo, limo, limo. This is The Colbert Report."	April 29	4057
Stephen begins by mentioning Barack Obama's repudiation of comments by Jeremiah Wright. He then discusses John McCain's superstitions. Stephen then talks about Vladimir Putin aligning the Russian government with the Russian Orthodox Church and a Florida legislator's attempt to issue a Christian license plate. In "Tip of the Hat, Wag of the Finger," he tips his hat to Mattel and wags his finger at LASIK critics and cuddle parties. Finally, Stephen interviews Anne Lamott about her book, Grace (Eventually): Thoughts on Faith.
389	"None"	Donna Brazile, Noah Feldman	"Duck, duck, duck, truth. This is The Colbert Report."	April 30	4058
Stephen begins by saying that J.D. Salinger refuses to come on his show. He then talks about the Jeremiah Wright controversy. He talks to Donna Brazile about Barack Obama and how the Wright controversy is being dealt with. Stephen then talks about the people of Guam voting in the current campaign. He then repeats the "Better Know a Protectorate" interview with Madeleine Bordallo. Finally, Stephen interviews Noah Feldman about the constitution of Iraq.

=== May ===
On May 6, 2008, The Colbert Report debuted in the United Kingdom on FX.

No.	"The Wørd"	Guest(s)	Introductory phrase	Original release date	Prod. code
390	"None"	James Kunstler	"I started my Kentucky Derby party early. I'm full of Julep and I got a gun. This is The Colbert Report."	May 1	4059
Stephen mentions Laura Bush's wedding advice for her daughter, Jenna. In "Trailers That Are Destroying America: Summer Movie Edition," he discusses the trailers for Indiana Jones and the Kingdom of the Crystal Skull, Sex and the City and Iron Man. Next, in Formidable Opponent, Stephen debates himself on how superdelegates should choose the Democratic presidential candidate. Finally, Stephen interviews James Kunstler about peak oil.
391	"Free Gas!"	Carl Hiaasen, Rain	"Happy Cinco de Mayo. Remember, tomorrow's a great day to buy a used piñata. This is The Colbert Report.	May 5	4060
Stephen begins by talking about the Time 100 and losing again to Rain and, again, issues his dance-off challenge to him. In "The Wørd," he talks about Hillary Clinton and John McCain's plan for a gas tax holiday. Stephen then talks about Rain's movie debut in the film Speed Racer. In "Alpha Dog of the Week," he congratulates an anonymous Tennessee 911 operator who fell asleep during an emergency call. He then interviews Carl Hiaasen about his book, The Downhill Lie. Rain then turns up for the dance-off.
392	"Collateral Friendage"	Nathan Gunn	"Shouldn't it be, 'No, we don't have any bananas?' That's been bugging me for 75 years. This is The Colbert Report."	May 6	4061
Stephen begins by talking about an article which states that a woman's voice becomes sexier when she is ovulating. In "The Wørd," he argues that George W. Bush is not as big a political liability as Jeremiah Wright. In a special edition of "Stephen's Sound Advice," he talks about Karl Rove's advice on how to win the election. Finally, Stephen interviews Nathan Gunn about opera.
393	"None"	Hasan Elahi, George Johnson	"You know what they say, 'When in Rome, get on a plane back to America.' This is The Colbert Report."	May 7	4062
Stephen talks about auditions for The Rockettes, claiming that those who fail can join his "Shockettes," who also act as his bodyguards. He then talks about Nelson Mandela being on the terrorist watch list. He then interviews Hasan Elahi, who himself is on the list. In "Democralypse Now," Stephen talks about the North Carolina and Indiana primaries. Finally, he interviews George Johnson about his book, The Ten Most Beautiful Experiments.
394	"None"	Garrett Reisman, Arianna Huffington	None (show begins with opening sequence)	May 8	4063
Stephen begins by speaking with astronaut Garrett Reisman, who is aboard the International Space Station, about his wearing of a Wriststrong bracelet in space. He then talks about high gasoline prices and how each dollar of gas purchased is then spent. Next, Stephen interviews Arianna Huffington about politics. Finally, Stephen discusses the passing of Albert Hofmann.
395	"None"	Mehmet Oz	"The price of stamps rose a penny. Sweet, I just made twenty cents on my pack of "forever stamps." This is The Colbert Report."	May 12	4064
Stephen begins by talking about Terry McAuliffe incorrectly saying that Tim Russert's father was dead. In his "Cold War Update," he talks about Belarus, China and Vladimir Putin resigning as President of Russia and becoming the Prime Minister. The "ThreatDown:" 5: Airlines! 4: Women's Softball! 3: Keyboards! 2: Isabella Rossellini! 1: Bears! He then interviews Mehmet Oz about his book You: The Owner's Manual.
396	"None"	Jennifer Hooper McCarty	"You put your left foot in, you take your left foot out. You put your left foot in and you shake it all about. Who knew restless leg syndrome was so much fun? This is The Colbert Report."	May 13	4065
Stephen starts by talking about the West Virginia primary. He then talks about a leaked clip of Bill O'Reilly on Inside Edition, in which he loses his temper. Stephen claims that O'Reilly did nothing wrong and tries to prove it using an "early" clip of himself in which he loses his temper. In "Better Know a Lobby," he talks to Paul Helmke of the Brady Campaign, a gun control lobby. Finally, Stephen interviews Jennifer Hooper McCarty about the sinking of the Titanic.
397	"Declaration Of Warming"	Laura Dern, Grover Norquist	"Give a man a fish, he'll eat for a day. Give him a subprime fish loan and you're in business, buddy. This is The Colbert Report."	May 14	4066
Stephen briefly mentions John Edwards' endorsement of Barack Obama. In "Who's NOT Honoring Me Now," he complains about a new species of spider being named after Neil Young, and the University of Massachusetts Amherst not giving him an honorary law degree. He then talks about Paul McCartney's eco-car being flown from Japan. Next, Stephen interviews Laura Dern about her new film, Recount. Finally, Stephen interviews Grover Norquist about politics.
398	"Jail Sweet Jail"	Andrei Cherny	"Good things come to those who wait. (pause) This is The Colbert Report."	May 15	4067
Stephen begins by honoring American Craft Beer Week. He then discusses John Edwards' endorsement of Barack Obama. He then talks about President Bush's speech in Israel. Next, he discusses some U.S. states considering letting prisoners out early to save money. In "Stephen Colbert's Bears & Balls," he discusses high food prices, dollar stores and high gas prices. Finally, Stephen interviews Andrei Cherny about the Berlin Airlift.
399	"None"	Tony Perkins, Brian Greene	"We're starting summer hours here. Thank you and goodnight. This is The Colbert Report."	May 27	4068
Stephen discusses controversial comments made by John Hagee and Rod Parsley, pastors who endorsed John McCain. He talks about California's recent decision to allow gay marriage and interviews Tony Perkins on the subject. In the "Trailers That Are Destroying America" segment, Stephen complains about The Incredible Hulk and Hancock, but praises Valkyrie. Finally, Stephen interviews Brian Greene about the World Science Festival.
400	"Brushback Pitch"	Claire McCaskill	"Tonight's show is brought to you by the number '1' and the letter 'me.' This is The Colbert Report."	May 28	4069
Stephen talks about the Phoenix landing on Mars and possibly discovering microbes. This leads to a new segment, "Microbe Beat!" He then discusses Major League Baseball threatening to sue Chicago Little League teams for using MLB team names without paying a licensing fee. In "Cheating Death with Dr. Stephen T. Colbert, D.F.A.," he talks about hydration, pet health and plastic surgery. Finally, Stephen interviews Claire McCaskill about politics and her endorsement of Barack Obama.
401	"None"	Tad Devine, David Sirota	"Early to bed and early to rise makes you a loser. Let's party all night long. This is The Colbert Report."	May 29	4070
Stephen discusses the International Space Station's broken toilet. In the "Democralypse Now" segment, he talks about the Democratic National Committee's upcoming resolution of Florida and Michigan's nullified primaries. He then interviews Tad Devine on the subject. In "Tip of the Hat, Wag of the Finger," Stephen wags his finger at Scott McClellan, tips his hat to Michelle Malkin and wags his finger at blind people. Finally, Stephen interviews David Sirota about his book, The Uprising.

=== June ===
No.	"The Wørd"	Guest(s)	Introductory phrase	Original release date	Prod. code
402	"Media Culpa"	Jon Paskowitz	I saw Sex and the City. Spoiler alert: she picks the Vivienne Westwood dress. (mouths "Oh my God") This is The Colbert Report."	June 2	4071
Stephen starts by talking about Barack Obama resigning from his church. Stephen then claims the fire on the Universal Studios lot was a sign that God was listening to his prayers. In "The Wørd," he talks about Scott McClellan's view that the media was partly to blame for the Iraq War. In "Colbert Platinum," he talks about servants' quarters on private planes, a US$175 hamburger and video stamps. Stephen then interviews Jon Paskowitz about surfing. Finally, he talks about Democratic votes from Florida and Michigan.
403	"Unhealthy Competition"	George Will	"Time flies, especially since I built a clockapult. This is The Colbert Report."	June 3	4072
Stephen starts by grieving over the final Democratic primaries and expressing his anger that it is now over. In "The Wørd," he suggests that to continue the war on terror, Hezbollah and Al-Qaeda should fight each other. In "Stephen's Sound Advice," he gives advice on finding a summer job. Finally, he interviews George Will about conservatism; Will states that he is an agnostic.
404	"None"	Bob Barr, Salman Rushdie	"Today is the first day of the rest of your life...and it's already 11:30. What a waste. This is The Colbert Report."	June 4	4073
Stephen starts by talking about Barack Obama being the Democratic candidate for the election. He also talks about John McCain's speech about Obama. Stephen then talks about the Libertarian Party and talks to its presidential candidate Bob Barr. He then interviews Salman Rushdie about his new book The Enchantress of Florence. He ends with "The Lost O'Reilly Tapes," which shows more footage of Stephen's interview with Bill O'Reilly.
405	"Oh, The Places You'll Stay"	Pat Buchanan	"I regret that I have but one life to give. I want more lives! This is The Colbert Report."	June 5	4074
Stephen starts by talking about a television adaptation of The Andromeda Strain, in which one character mentions she watches The Colbert Report. In "The Wørd," he talks about a speech he made at Princeton University, and asks students not to change the world. In "Stephen Colbert's Sport Report," he talks about Usain Bolt breaking the 100 metres world record and then interviews Mike Forrester, an American lumberjack sportsman. Finally, Stephen interviews Pat Buchanan about how World War II could have been avoided.
406	"If At First You Don't Secede"	Philip Weiss	"I always say, 'If you can't beat 'em, report 'em to Homeland Security.' They'll beat 'em for you. This is The Colbert Report."	June 9	4075
Stephen starts by talking about Hillary Clinton dropping out of the presidential race. In "The Wørd," he talks about how the next President will not be from the South, and the controversy of a large Confederate flag being flown in Tampa Bay. In the "ThreatDown:" 5. Albatrosses! 4. Naked People! 3. T-Shirts! 2. High Class Vermin! 1. Secret Negro presidents! Finally, he interviews Philip Weiss on his theory that men are not automatically monogamous.
407	"None"	Alan Rabinowitz	"I'm Stephen Colbert, the most trusted name in the name of my show. This is The Colbert Report."	June 10	4076
Stephen talks about the new iPhone, and complains that it is better than the free one that he begged Apple Inc. to give to him. He then talks about the allegations that a fist-bump between Barack and Michelle Obama is also used by Hezbollah, and about Barack's alleged elitism. In "Smokin' Pole: The Fight for Arctic Riches," Stephen talks about a prediction that in the future, countries will fight over the resources in the Arctic, and how he has bought the rights to the theme music from Hockey Night in Canada. Finally, Stephen interviews Alan Rabinowitz about endangered cats.
408	"U.S. Airweighs"	David Hajdu	"The heat wave is over, but I'm still smokin'. This is The Colbert Report."	June 11	4077
Stephen discusses Israel's choice of its national bird. In the "Leviticus Update" segment, he talks about an Israeli rabbi ruling that giraffe is Kosher. Stephen then discusses how high gas prices are affecting airlines. The "Un-American News: U.S. Election Edition" focuses on foreign newspapers' coverage of Barack Obama's presidential campaign. Finally, Stephen interviews David Hajdu about how comic books changed America.
409	"None"	Winona LaDuke, Dixon Despommier	"Tony Awards, it's not too late to revise your list of nominees. (theatrically) Pow! This is The Colbert Report."	June 12	4078
Stephen briefly comments on the world's oldest church allegedly being found in Jordan. He then offers up "Stephen Colbert's Make McCain Exciting Challenge!," inviting viewers to replace the green screen behind John McCain at one of his speeches with something exciting. Stephen then interviews Winona LaDuke about the impact of Native Americans on the presidential election. In the "We the MEdiator" segment, he settles the feud between Clint Eastwood and Spike Lee. Finally, Stephen interviews Dixon Despommier about vertical farming.
410	"Ploy-cott"	Kenneth R. Miller, R.E.M.	"Have I told you lately that I love me? This is The Colbert Report."	June 16	4079
Stephen begins by paying tribute to Tim Russert. He then talks about a new "Global Edition" of his show, which leads to a discussion on the 2008 Summer Olympics. In a new segment, "The Enemy Within," Stephen profiles a substitute teacher from Land o' Lakes, Florida who was fired for allegedly practicing wizardry. He then interviews Kenneth R. Miller about intelligent design. Finally, Stephen plays another song from R.E.M.'s appearance in April, "Hollow Man."
411	"None"	Neal Katyal, Jonathan Zittrain	"Mark my words...seriously, Mark, I need my words. Where's my script? This is The Colbert Report."	June 17	4080
Stephen first talks about collecting his Peabody Award. He then goes on to talk about prisoners at Guantanamo being able to challenge their cases in civilian courts and interviews Neal Katyal about the decision. In "Stephen Colbert's Sport Report," Stephen talks about Ken Griffey Jr. scoring his 600th home run, gambling in basketball, and Mike Forrester making it through to the next stage of his timber sports contest. Finally, he interviews Jonathan Zittrain on the future of the internet.
412	"Lexicon Artist"	Uma Mysorekar, Junot Díaz	"This is the dawning of the Age of Colbertius. This is The Colbert Report."	June 18	4081
Stephen again starts by talking about his Peabody Award. In "The Wørd," he says that John McCain is distancing himself from President Bush by using another word to describe the war on terror. Stephen then talks about Barack Obama going to church in a new segment, "Stephen Colbert's Barack Obama Church Search," and discusses if Obama should be a Hindu. He then talks to Uma Mysorekar about the faith. Finally, Stephen interviews Junot Díaz about his books.
413	"None"	N. T. Wright, Cookie Monster	"Beauty isn't in the eye of the beholder; I've checked. There's nothing in there but veins and goo. This is The Colbert Report."	June 19	4082
Stephen starts with a "Shout Out" to George Foster Peabody for winning the "Stephen T. Colbert Award in Excellence for Recognizing Excellence." He then talks about comments made by Sean Hannity. Stephen then talks about cookies no longer being the most popular snack for children under the age of 6, blaming Cookie Monster for eating fruit. This results in Cookie Monster making a guest appearance. Finally, he interviews N. T. Wright on Christianity and heaven. During the signing off, Stephen notices his Peabody is missing, which Cookie Monster noticed before and described it as looking like a cookie, but Stephen slaps his hand away. When he notices his Peabody is missing, he asks, "Cookie Monster, did you eat my Peabody?"
414	"Black & White"	Barbara Ehrenreich	"Guests of The Colbert Report stay at the luxurious...crashing with a friend. This is The Colbert Report."	June 23	4083
Stephen talks about the anniversary of him breaking his wrist and points out cuts and bruises on his face, starting a campaign against "face violence". He then talks about South Africa ruling that Chinese South Africans are black. In "Tip of the Hat, Wag of the Finger," Stephen wags his finger at Barack Obama, then tips his hat to him. He wags his finger at California, tips his hat to condoms and the South Pole and wags his finger at high fuel prices. Finally, Stephen interviews Barbara Ehrenreich about the differences between the rich and poor.
415	"Bleep"	Will Smith	"I promise to deliver the truth in the next thirty minutes or it's free. This is The Colbert Report."	June 24	4084
Stephen starts by talking about "face violence." He then talks about the oil crisis. In "The Wørd," Stephen mistakenly thinks that George Carlin banned the "seven words you can never say on television." He then talks again about the Myrmekiaphila neilyoungi, the spider named after Neil Young. He reveals that Jason E. Bond, who named the spider, will also name a spider after Stephen, and talks to him over the phone. Finally, Stephen interviews Will Smith about his new film, Hancock.
416	"None"	Paul Goldberger, Neil DeGrasse Tyson	"What do I want? My own show! When do I want it? Now! This is The Colbert Report."	June 25	4085
Stephen begins by showing viewer submissions for "Stephen Colbert's Make McCain Exciting Challenge!" He then discusses other nations' impressive skylines and interviews Paul Goldberger about architecture. In the "Judge, Jury & Executioner: Tenth Justice Edition" segment, he discusses the Supreme Court's rulings related to the Exxon Valdez oil spill, the Second Amendment and an upcoming ruling on the Navy's use of sonar. Finally, Stephen interviews Neil DeGrasse Tyson about his show, NOVA scienceNOW.
417	"None"	Robert Wexler	"I'm about to take two weeks off. You know what that means? Fresh injuries. This is The Colbert Report."	June 26	4086
Stephen starts by talking about North Korea's disarmament of its nuclear weapons program. He then figures out which new countries should be in the Axis of Evil. Stephen then talks about the Supreme Court's ruling that guns should be allowed in Washington D. C. In a new segment, "Stephen Colbert's The Tank is Half Full," he looks at the good side of the oil crisis. In "Difference Makers," Stephen reruns a story from June 29, 2006, about a man who believes fireworks shouldn't be illegal. Finally, he interviews Robert Wexler about liberalism.

=== July ===
No.	"The Wørd"	Guest(s)	Introductory phrase	Original release date	Prod. code
418	"Priceless"	Surya Das, Dan Esty	"Hey, In Touch magazine! If Brangelina turns you down, I got a pair of twins you can photograph. (mouths 'My Balls!') This is The Colbert Report."	July 14	4087
Stephen discusses the proposed merger between Anheuser-Busch and InBev. He then talks about the EPA's recent lowering of the dollar value of a human life. In "Stephen Colbert's Barack Obama's Church Search," he talks to Lama Surya Das about why Obama should become a Buddhist. Finally, Stephen interviews Dan Esty about solutions to environmental problems.
419	"None"	Julia Sweig, Jason Riley	"I'm like my own All-Star Game, in that tonight, I'm also not trying very hard. This is The Colbert Report."	July 15	4088
Stephen discusses the controversial cartoon of Barack Obama on the cover of The New Yorker. He talks about Miss Venezuela winning the Miss Universe pageant, which leads to a discussion on Hugo Chávez. He then interviews Julia Sweig about the oil situations in Venezuela and Brazil. In the "Difference Makers" segment, Stephen profiles Donald Trump for erecting a 70-foot flagpole in Rancho Palos Verdes, California. Finally, Stephen interviews Jason Riley about immigration.
420	"Placebo"	Rush	"Good fences make good neighbors and good neighbors make good fences. Get on it, Mexico. This is The Colbert Report."	July 16	4089
The show starts with the song "Limelight" by Rush being played instead of the normal theme tune. Stephen complains to Jimmy, who claims to be a big Rush fan. In "The Wørd," Stephen says that we need to think that the economy is getting better to make it better. In "Alpha Dog of the Week," he praises George W. Bush for his attitude to the environment at the G8 Summit. Stephen then interviews Rush, who then perform their classic, "Tom Sawyer." The word next to Stephen in the opening credits reads, "ROCK ON!"
421	"None"	Rush, Elizabeth Edwards	(thanking Rush for yesterday's performance) Rush, everybody! Alex, Neil, Geddy, thanks so much. Uhh... This is The Colbert Report."	July 17	4090
The show begins with Rush finally finishing yesterday's performance. Stephen talks about gas stations in New York City running out of 4's for the gas signs. In "Tip of the Hat, Wag of the Finger," he tips his hat to Subway, then wags his finger at it. He then wags his finger at Australia and tips his hat to a man who put up a controversial billboard in St. Cloud, Florida. Next, Stephen presents more entries in "Stephen Colbert's Make McCain Exciting Challenge!" Finally, he interviews Elizabeth Edwards about universal health care.
422	"None"	Jim Webb	"Batman may have ruled the box office but Mamma Mia! ruled my heart. This is The Colbert Report."	July 21	4091
Stephen discusses Barack Obama's foreign trip in "Barack Obama's Elitist Summer Abroad." He then talks about John McCain's travel plans in "John McCain's Fiscally Responsible Staycation." In "Better Know a Lobby," Stephen profiles the environmental lobby. Finally, Stephen interviews Jim Webb about politics and his book, A Time to Fight. The word next to Stephen in the opening credits changes to "MULTI-GRAIN."
423	"Fight to the Furnish"	Margaret Spellings	"I'm a man of few words but I say them over and over and over. This is The Colbert Report."	July 22	4092
Stephen again comments on Barack Obama's trip abroad. He then talks about the Air Force wanting to design in-flight "comfort capsules" on military planes so generals and government officials can travel luxuriously. Next, Stephen discusses Elton John getting his own Ben & Jerry's ice cream flavor. He then mentions a new gay-friendly advertisement for South Carolina. Finally, Stephen interviews Margaret Spellings about No Child Left Behind.
424	"Join The European Union"	Nas	This is a "no smoking" building. Then what am I doing here? This is The Colbert Report."	July 23	4093
Stephen talks about Starbucks' closing of 600 stores. He then says that to combat the United States dollar's loss of value against the euro, America should join the European Union. He then talks about accusations that Fox News is racist, as well as the feud between Nas and Bill O'Reilly. Stephen then interviews Nas about the feud and his new album, Untitled. Finally, Nas performs "Sly Fox."
425	"None"	Laurie Goodstein, Garrett Reisman	"Count your blessings, America. (points to self) One. This is The Colbert Report."	July 24	4094
Stephen again discusses Barack Obama's trip abroad. He then talks about a rift in the Anglican church regarding homosexuals being ordained priests. Stephen then interviews Laurie Goodstein on the topic. The "ThreatDown:" 4. New Age Healers! 3. Greek courts! 2. Granite Countertops! Finally, Stephen interviews Garrett Reisman about his time in space.
426	"None"	Toby Keith	"Do not store me near an open flame. My contents are under pressure. This is The Colbert Report."	July 28	4095
Stephen starts by talking about the end of Barack Obama's trip abroad, and John McCain's claims of media bias. He says that he was planning to comment on Robert Novak running over a cyclist, but because of Novak's ill health, he did not consider it appropriate. In "Stephen Colbert's Trigger Happy," he covers the District of Columbia v. Heller case, allowing guns in national parks and a special gun being made for the Heller ruling. He then talks to Toby Keith about his film Beer for My Horses. Finally, Keith performs "Beer for My Horses."
427	"Honest Belief"	Eric Roston	"I always give 110%, so the way I see it, somebody owes me a 10% refund. This is The Colbert Report."	July 29	4096
Stephen starts by talking about the indictment of Ted Stevens. He then talks about John McCain encouraging people to wear sunscreen and his visit to the Dalai Lama. In "The Wørd," Stephen discusses the use of torture on terror suspects. In the 52nd part of "Better Know a District," he interviews Carolyn B. Maloney from New York's 14th. Finally, Stephen interviews Eric Roston about the environmental effect of carbon emissions.
428	"Save Ferris"	Crosby, Stills & Nash	"For every action, I have a superior and opposite reaction. This is The Colbert Report."	July 30	4097
Stephen continues to talk about the indictment of Ted Stevens. In "The Wørd," Stephen talks about the decline of state fairs. He then announces that a spider has been named after him, and that next week, Jason Bond will announce which one it will be. Stephen then gives an apology to Canton, Georgia, after he called it "crappy" on a previous episode. He claims that he meant to refer to Canton, Kansas. He then interviews Crosby, Stills & Nash, and performs "Teach Your Children" alongside them, dressed up as Neil Young.
429	"None"	Brendan I. Koerner, Buzz Aldrin	"Frère Jacques, Frère Jacques, Dormez-truth. This is The Colbert Report."	July 31	4098
Stephen begins by talking about job losses at Starbucks. He then talks about the United Nations trying to fight global warming and talks to Brendan I. Koerner about environmental issues. In "Cheating Death with Dr. Stephen T. Colbert, D.F.A.," Stephen talks about toxins in lobsters, "Truman Show Delusion" and germs that are resistant to chlorine. He then interviews Buzz Aldrin about his experiences as an astronaut.

=== August ===
No.	"The Wørd"	Guest(s)	Introductory phrase	Original release date	Prod. code
430	"We The"	Lucas Conley, The Apples in Stereo	"America, I wear the pants in this relationship...(Stephen looks down)...most of the time. This is The Colbert Report."	August 4	4099
Stephen begins by talking about the Democrats taking a five-week recess. In "The Wørd," he talks about a commercial made by the John McCain campaign attacking the "celebrity" status of Barack Obama. Stephen then talks about Ryan Seacrest being bitten by a shark. He then talks to Lucas Conley about branding. Finally, The Apples in Stereo perform "Can You Feel It?"
431	"Divided We Win"	David Carr	"The way to a man's heart is through his stomach; just make sure to stab with an upward motion. This is The Colbert Report."	August 5	4100
Stephen starts by talking about a Starbucks promotion. He then talks about the popularity of Barack Obama slightly falling and his plans to save on gas by inflating tires. Stephen then talks about how Republicans can win votes with wedge issues. He then issues another apology in relation to Canton, Kansas, by saying he was in another mix-up, this time with Canton, South Dakota. Finally, Stephen interviews David Carr about his drug addiction and his work with The New York Times.
432	"None"	Jason Bond, Kevin Costner	"You know what they say, 'If it ain't broke, let me at it.' This is The Colbert Report."	August 6	4101
Stephen starts by talking again about Barack Obama's gas-saving tips. He then interviews Jason Bond about the spider Bond named after him, the Aptostichus stephencolberti. In "Colbert Platinum," Stephen talks about personal shoppers buying cheaper products, a black watermelon being sold at auction for $6,100 and introduces a new "Colbert Diamond Class" for a Qatar oil sheikh who had his car flown to London for an oil change. Finally, he interviews Kevin Costner about his film Swing Vote.
433	"None"	Devin Gordon, Thomas Frank	"Take everything I say with a grain of salt because my new sponsor...is salt. This is The Colbert Report."	August 7	4102
Stephen begins by talking about the conviction of Salim Hamdan. In "Stephen Colbert's Sport Report," he then talks about the 2008 Summer Olympics and interviews Devin Gordon about them. In "Tip of the Hat, Wag of the Finger," he wags his finger at his corner deli owner and Denzel Washington, and tips his hat to a man who called 911 after the sauce was left off his Subway sandwich. Finally, he interviews Thomas Frank about his view that conservatism is harming the government.
434	"Catharsis"	Jorge Ramos	"In case of fire, remain in your seats until I am out of the building. This is The Colbert Report."	August 11	4103
Stephen starts by talking about Jorge Ramos and speaks to Esteban Colberto, who is a big fan of Ramos'. In "The Wørd," Stephen talks about supporters of Hillary Clinton wanting more power at the Democratic National Convention. In "Nailed 'Em," Stephen talks about a man who lost his job after failing a drug test, despite the fact that he took medical marijuana. Finally, he interviews Ramos about his work on Univision.
435	"None"	Joey Cheek, Jane Mayer	"If life gives you lemons, save the receipt. This is The Colbert Report."	August 12	4104
Stephen begins by repeating his request to speak at the Democratic National Convention, and talks about the extra-marital affair committed by John Edwards. He then talks about the 2008 Summer Olympics and talks to Olympic athlete Joey Cheek about his work in Darfur. Stephen then apologizes to Canton, South Dakota for insulting them, and then insults Canton, Texas. Finally, he interviews Jane Mayer about torture.
436	"Blame Monica Goodling"	Dick Meyer	"Tonight's Colbert penny pincher: if you're out of milk, add water to yogurt. This is The Colbert Report."	August 13	4105
Stephen begins by breaking the world record for the number of episodes of The Colbert Report. He then discusses John McCain allegedly plagiarizing Wikipedia. He then blames Monica Goodling for most of the world's problems. In "Formidable Opponent," Stephen debates himself on the merits of offshore oil drilling. Finally, Stephen interviews Dick Meyer about his book, Why We Hate Us.
437	"None"	Bing West	"If I had a quarter for every time I said I had a nickel, I'd have five times as much theoretical money. This is The Colbert Report."	August 14	4106
Stephen discusses his appearance in an answer on Jeopardy! and Alex Trebek's mispronunciation of "Report." The ThreatDown: 5. Russia! 4. Corrections! 3. Inflatable Turds! 2. Limousine Shortages! 1. iPhones! He then shows a "filmstrip" about the 1952 Summer Olympics and Finland. Finally, Stephen interviews Bing West about the Iraq War.
438	"None"	Will Shortz, Bob Barr, Scott McClellan	"To the Democrats in the Mile High City: Remember, if you drink liquor at that altitude, you might become interesting. This is The Colbert Report."	August 26	4107
Stephen begins by pretending to broadcast live from the Democratic National Convention, and talks about Michelle Obama's speech. He then talks about the 88th anniversary of the Nineteenth Amendment and Hillary Clinton's speech, and complains about anniversaries they are neglecting, including the birthday of Will Shortz, who makes a guest appearance. Stephen then talks about the Democrats making their convention environmentally friendly. He then interviews Bob Barr about his run for President for the Libertarian Party. He then interviews Scott McClellan about his book What Happened. Finally, Stephen tries to call the White House and talk to President Bush, but fails.
439	"None"	Mike Huckabee	"Hey Democrats, I'm getting a little nervous here, you haven't invited me to speak at your convention yet. Joke's over guys! This is The Colbert Report."	August 27	4108
Stephen continues to pretend that he is reporting live from Denver. He then claims that it wasn't Sasha Obama saying goodnight to Barack Obama at the Democratic National Convention, referring to an incident at the Olympics. Stephen talks about Hillary Clinton's speech at the convention. He then looks at the life of a repo man named Scott O'Brien. Stephen then interviews Mike Huckabee about the presidential election. He ends by mourning the passing of Stephanie Tubbs Jones and plays part of her Better Know a District interview.
440	"Acid Flashback"	Rick Brookhiser	"Hey Obama! You want to impress me with a speech on the 50-yard line of a football field? Give it during the game! This is The Colbert Report."	August 28	4109
Stephen still continues to pretend he is in Denver. In "The Wørd," he discusses Barack Obama's acceptance speech and his life in the 1960s. Stephen then talks about the roll call vote to nominate Obama as the Democratic Party nominee for President, and mentions the problems with the vote from Guam. Finally, he talks to Rick Brookhiser about George Washington.
441	"None"	Terrell Davis, John McWhorter	None (show begins with opening sequence)	August 29	4110
Stephen continues to pretend he's in Denver. He talks about John McCain choosing Sarah Palin as his running mate, and about Barack Obama accepting the Democratic Party's nomination for President. He then interviews Terrell Davis via satellite about his opinion of Obama's acceptance speech. In "Better Know a Lobby," Stephen gets to know the atheist lobby. He then interviews John McWhorter about politics. Finally, Stephen stops his microwave oven, which had been running since the start of the Democratic National Convention.

=== September ===
No.	"The Wørd"	Guest(s)	Introductory phrase	Original release date	Prod. code
442	"That's The Ticket"	Laura Tyson	"Shave and a Haircut, nine bits. (Explaining) Inflation. This is The Colbert Report."	September 2	4111
Stephen begins by pretending he is in Saint Paul for the Republican National Convention. Instead of personally reporting on Hurricane Gustav, he uses an "older" version of himself on The Daily Show. Stephen then reports on the convention, and the news that Sarah Palin's daughter is pregnant. In "The Wørd," he says that Palin is experienced enough to be Vice President. He then presents the final edition of "Stephen Colbert's Make McCain Exciting Challenge!" Finally, he interviews Laura Tyson about Barack Obama's views on the economy.
443	"None"	Susan Eisenhower, Doris Kearns Goodwin	"Those Republican speakers dished up a lot of red meat last night. They should have their colons checked. This is The Colbert Report."	September 3	4112
Stephen begins by claiming he is reporting from New Orleans. He then talks about the Republican National Convention. Stephen then interviews Susan Eisenhower about her support for Barack Obama. He then shows a campaign commercial made by himself, claiming that the woman behind John McCain is John McCain. Stephen then interviews Doris Kearns Goodwin about Sarah Palin.
444	"None"	Adam Brickley, Ron Paul	"Warning: I may contain more than a trace amount of nut. This is The Colbert Report."	September 4	4113
Stephen begins by pretending he is in the Atlanta airport. He then talks about the Republican National Convention. Stephen then interviews Adam Brickley about his role in getting Sarah Palin chosen as the Republican candidate for Vice President. In a special "RNC Edition" of "Tip of the Hat, Wag of the Finger," he tips his hat to Fred Thompson and Cindy McCain and wags his finger to some sign makers who made a sign stating "Raisin McCain" rather than "Raising McCain." Stephen then interviews Ron Paul about politics.
445	"None"	David Paterson	"Well, we made it through another presidential election. What? Two more months? This is The Colbert Report."	September 5	4114
Stephen begins by talking about his coverage of the Republican National Convention, saying that he is now back in Saint Paul. He then talks about John McCain accepting the Republican Party's nomination for President, which he did in front of a "Green Screen," resulting in Stephen creating another "Green Screen Challenge." He then presents a "Better Know a District Update," in which he reports that Lynn Westmoreland called Barack and Michelle Obama "uppity." He then interviews David Paterson about his role as Governor of New York.
446	"How Dare You?"	Rev. Peter J. Gomes	"By the power vested in me, I now pronounce us 'host' and 'audience.' You may kiss the screen. This is The Colbert Report."	September 15	4115
Stephen begins by saying that people should not worry about the 2008 financial crisis, even though he is losing money himself. In "The Wørd," he talks about John McCain and Sarah Palin hesitating to allow journalists to ask them questions. In "Colbert Platinum," he talks about a gold statue of Kate Moss, King Mswati III of Swaziland selecting a bride out of "Tens of thousands of bare-breasted virgins," and wrapping paper made out of money. He then interviews the Rev. Peter J. Gomes about his views on religion.
447	"None"	Tyson Slocum, Rick Reilly	"Hey, TiVo owners! Look for a secret message when you watch the commercials in their entirety. This is The Colbert Report."	September 16	4116
Stephen starts by talking about the 2008 financial crisis, including his own problems. He therefore gets some advice from his financial advisor Gorlock. Stephen then interviews Tyson Slocum about plans to expand offshore drilling to help solve the 2008 financial crisis, and current scandals at the United States Department of the Interior. The "ThreatDown:" 5: Russia! 4: Bobcats! 3: Scientists! 2: Rat-Bots! 1: Icebergs! Stephen then interviews Rick Reilly about the charity Nothing but Nets.
448	"Powerless"	Robert Lutz	"Hey, Liquid Paper! Your bottle should say you don't work on computer screens. This is The Colbert Report."	September 17	4117
Stephen talks about the 2008 financial crisis and John McCain's reaction. In response to McCain refusing to come on his show, Stephen starts rumors about him. In "The Wørd," he claims that President Bush has failed to capture Osama bin Laden because he does not have superpowers. Stephen then profiles a man who went to the bathroom during "God Bless America." He then interviews Robert Lutz about a new GM electric car, the Chevrolet Volt. Finally, he announces that his song, "Charlene (I'm Right Behind You)," is on Rock Band 2.
449	"None"	Maria Bartiromo	"I know the knife is supposed to go next to the spoon, but where does the gun go? This is The Colbert Report."	September 18	4118
Stephen starts talking about the 2008 financial crisis, but then talks about being nominated for an Emmy Award. In "Smokin' Pole: The Fight for Arctic Riches," Stephen talks about Canadian Prime Minister Stephen Harper's views on Arctic sovereignty, Russian bomber planes resuming missions, and American scientists mapping the Arctic seabed. He then talks about his DNA being shot into space and interviews Richard Garriott via telephone about the news. Stephen then interviews Maria Bartiromo about the 2008 financial crisis.
450	"OhMyGodSocietyIsCollapsing AndWeWillSoonBeDevouring EachOtherInTheStreetsLike DogsAndACrippledOne- EyedBoyWillBeKingIfWe Don'tFixThisByNextWeek!"	Jackson Browne	"Hey, autumnal equinox! If the nights are getting longer, why is my show still only a half-hour? This is The Colbert Report."	September 23	4119
Stephen talks about his show winning an Emmy Award for writing, but losing an Emmy Award to Don Rickles, and discovers one of his writers, Peter Gross, was at Rickles' show. In "The Wørd," he talks about the 2008 financial crisis. Stephen then punishes Gross by making him write insults to himself. He then talks about the Republican Party using songs without permission. Stephen then interviews Jackson Browne, who is suing John McCain for using his song, "Running on Empty." Browne then performs his song, "Going Down to Cuba."
451	"None"	Joe Nocera, Cornel West	"This message will self-destruct, but only if you have one of those new exploding TV's. This is The Colbert Report."	September 24	4120
Stephen starts with the 2008 financial crisis and the news that John McCain is suspending his campaign to help solve the crisis. He responds by suspending his show, then suspends the suspension and returns. He then interviews Joe Nocera about the crisis. In "Alpha Dog of the Week," Stephen praises Bill Bennett for attacking some "intellectuals" views of Sarah Palin. He then interviews Cornel West about his book Hope on a Tightrope.
452	"None"	Kim Gandy, Nick Carr	"Early to bed, early to rise makes a man miss my show. This is The Colbert Report."	September 25	4121
Stephen starts by talking about John McCain wanting to postpone the first presidential debate. In "Stephen Settles the Debate," he decides who is better: Franklin D. Roosevelt or Teddy Roosevelt. Stephen then talks about Sarah Palin and interviews National Organization for Women president Kim Gandy about Palin. Finally, he interviews Nick Carr, who believes that the internet makes people concentrate less.
453	"Ye Of Little Faith"	Paul Begala	"Nation, I will always make eye contact with you. This is The Colbert Report."	September 29	4122
Stephen begins by talking about the first presidential debate. In "The Wørd," he talks about the 2008 financial crisis. In "Cheating Death with Dr. Stephen T. Colbert, D.F.A.," Stephen talks about germs and heart health. Finally, he interviews Paul Begala about the presidential election.
454	"None"	James Taylor	"The days of atonement are upon us. I apologize for being perfect. This is The Colbert Report."	September 30	4123
Stephen begins by talking about the failure of a bailout bill in the U.S. House to help with the 2008 financial crisis. He then talks about the lift of the ban on offshore drilling and shows a commercial from a company called "Prescott Oil." In "Tip of the Hat, Wag of the Finger," Stephen wags his finger at The New York Times and tips his hat to Bette Midler and Wall Street "jagoffs." Finally, he interviews James Taylor, who performs the song "(I'm A) Road Runner."

=== October ===
No.	"The Wørd"	Guest(s)	Introductory phrase	Original release date	Prod. code
455	"Future Perfect"	Dave Levin	"I think, therefore you are. This is The Colbert Report."	October 1	4124
Stephen begins by talking about the 2008 financial crisis, by saying that out of the companies in the S&P 500, only one saw an increase in its stock value on Monday: Campbell's Soup. In "The Wørd," he claims it is a good idea to report on news before it has happened. Stephen then talks about increasing voter turnout and says it is better for young people to abstain from voting. Finally, he interviews Dave Levin about KIPP.
456	"None"	Stephen Greenblatt, Naomi Klein	"It's snowing on Mars so the following schools are closed: Microbe Academy, Bleep Blorp Elementary and St. Teresa's Blessed Crater. This is The Colbert Report."	October 2	4125
Stephen begins by talking about the vice presidential debate, even though he hadn't seen it. In case Sarah Palin made a mistake during the debate, he decided to take the heat off her by shooting a member of his audience. Stephen then talks about the personal stories of John McCain and Barack Obama, claiming their stories have Shakespearean qualities, and interviews Shakespearean scholar Stephen Greenblatt. In "Formidable Opponent," Stephen debates himself about the 2008 financial crisis. Finally, he interviews Naomi Klein about politics.
457	"Maverick Without A Cause"	Jim Cramer	"Hey, I Am America (And So Can You!) 2009 desk calendar! How dare you be in bookstores everywhere! This is The Colbert Report."	October 6	4126
Stephen begins by talking about O. J. Simpson being found guilty of kidnapping and armed robbery. He plans to bust him out by going to jail himself, so he shots the audience member he shot in the previous show again. In "The Wørd," Stephen talks about Sarah Palin not talking about the cause of climate change, and claims that causes are America's greatest enemy. He then presents a special financial edition of "Un-American News". Stephen then interviews Jim Cramer about the 2008 financial crisis.
458	"None"	Nate Silver	"The bad news: the Dow dropped 500 points today. The good news: I didn't know there were 500 left. This is The Colbert Report."	October 7	4127
Stephen begins by talking about the second presidential debate which was a town hall forum. He supports the idea of town hall forums and hold his own. The "ThreatDown:" 4. The Obama Channel! 3. Bulls! 2. Bears! 1. Zombies! He then talks about the nationalization of American banks and the belief that this is a path to communism, and claims that libraries are communist because everything in them is free. Finally, Stephen interviews Nate Silver, who predicts election results the same way he predicts baseball games.
459	"None"	Joe Scarborough	"If it's called the USA Today, why's all the news from yesterday? Busted! This is The Colbert Report."	October 8	4128
Stephen begins with an apology for the way he dressed during his town hall debate in the previous episode. He then talks about the second presidential debate, including a poll on Fox News that stated over 80% of their viewers believed John McCain won the debate. For Yom Kippur, Stephen brings out his "Atone Phone" and is called by Gilbert Gottfried, who apologizes for being jealous of Stephen's success. Finally, he interviews Joe Scarborough about the presidential election.
460	"None"	David Gergen, Oliver Stone	"The names in this broadcast have been changed to protect the innocent. This is The Molbert Report."	October 9	4129
Stephen begins by talking about the 2008 financial crisis. He then moves onto the presidential election and reports of Barack Obama's alleged ties to William Ayers. He then talks to David Gergen about his view that personal attacks will not win the election. In "Who's Not Honoring Me Now?", he attacks the MacArthur Foundation, the Rock and Roll Hall of Fame, and Nepal. Finally, he interviews Oliver Stone about his movie W.
461	"None"	Bethany McLean, Kathleen Parker	"Happy Columbus Day, if your name is Christopher Columbus. Everybody else back to work. This is The Colbert Report."	October 13	4130
Stephen begins by taking credit for The New York Times putting a clue relating to John McCain in their crossword. He then talks about the 2008 financial crisis. Stephen blames computers for the crisis and talks to Bethany McLean about how they can be stopped. In "Stephen Colbert's Bears & Balls," he talks about someone on eBay buying a house for $1.75, a Mexican company selling low-cost housing made out of intermodal containers, and the rising price of salt. Stephen then interviews Kathleen Parker about Sarah Palin.
462	"P.O.W."	Joseph Stiglitz	"They weren't booing at Sarah Palin at that hockey game. The crowd was just getting into the Halloween spirit. BOOOOOOO! This is The Colbert Report."	October 14	4131
Stephen begins by talking about the 2008 financial crisis and his anger that the Nobel Prize for Economics went to Paul Krugman. In "The Wørd," he claims that John McCain is a prisoner. In "Tip of the Hat, Wag of the Finger," Stephen wags his finger at Newsweek and electoral officials in Rensselaer County, New York, and tips his hat to a Japanese cat that saved a train station from bankruptcy by being promoted to station master. Finally, he interviews Joseph Stiglitz about the 2008 financial crisis.
463	"Freaky Three-Way Calling"	Tina Brown	"I will now have 22 minutes for my rebuttal. This is The Colbert Report.	October 15	4132
Stephen begins with the 2008 financial crisis. In "The Wørd," he talks about allegations that the National Security Agency eavesdropped on U.S. soldiers' telephone conversations that involved phone sex. Stephen then presents a "Lame Sports Edition" of "Stephen Colbert's Sport Report," which features the World Mind Sports Games, the Escape from Berkeley road race, and the Tampa Bay Rays. Finally, he interviews Tina Brown about The Daily Beast website. In the opening credits, the word next to Stephen changes to VOTE.
464	"None"	Brent Glass, Robert Greenwald	"The show is 22 minutes, but let's round it up to an hour. That'll be $800. This is The Joe the Plumber Report."	October 16	4133
Stephen starts by talking about the final presidential debate, praising John McCain, but attacking his references to Joe the Plumber. Stephen then talks about the third anniversary of The Colbert Report and that his portrait has now been accepted by Brent Glass as part of the National Museum of American History. He then interviews Robert Greenwald about his series of anti-McCain commercials on YouTube. Stephen then unveils a new portrait of himself, which features him holding his Emmy.
465	"None"	Fareed Zakaria, Wynton Marsalis	"If your actions speak louder than words, you're not yelling loud enough. This is The Colbert Report."	October 20	4134
Stephen begins by talking about Colin Powell endorsing Barack Obama for president. He then interviews Fareed Zakaria about the 2008 financial crisis. Stephen presents a new "lower cost" segment based on "Colbert Platinum", "Colbert Aluminum." He talks about Paris, rich people opening various bank accounts to protect themselves, and stealth wealth. Finally, Stephen talks to Wynton Marsalis about jazz and together they perform "The Star-Spangled Banner."
466	"Fantasyland"	Michael Farris	"Hey, America! You scratch my back, I'll demand you scratch my back more. This is The Colbert Report."	October 21	4135
Stephen begins by talking about Stephen Jr., his adopted eagle son, who was spotted in Oregon. In "The Wørd," Stephen discusses ACORN and alleged voter registration fraud. Stephen then examines the issue of God in the presidential election, after claims of a battle between God, Allah, Buddha and Hindu. He then plays some messages from his "Atone Phone." Finally, Stephen interviews Michael Farris about Patrick Henry College.
467	"None"	Cedric the Entertainer, David Frum	"I swum against the Tide with Bleach Alternative. This is The Colbert Report."	October 22	4136
Stephen begins by talking about John McCain trying to reach out to the middle class, and supports what he sees as McCain treating voters like children by not referring to their surnames. He talks about this to Cedric the Entertainer. Stephen then expresses his anger at a poll that claims his viewers have the 9th highest political knowledge in America. In "Movies That Are Destroying America," he discusses Quantum of Solace, High School Musical 3 and Milk. Stephen then interviews David Frum about the Republican Party.
468	"None"	Jonathan Alter	"Hey, pants! Why should I have to put you on one leg at a time? I'm not like everybody else. This is The Colbert Report."	October 23	4137
Stephen begins by talking about when he wagged his finger at Newsweek for printing a close-up photo of Sarah Palin showing her facial hair and claims he changed the world when People printed a similar photo without the hair. The "ThreatDown:" 5: Long John Silver's! 4: Iran! 3: Magnets! 2: Monkey waiters! 1: Larry Flynt! In "Difference Makers," Stephen profiles The National Hummer Club. Finally, he interviews Jonathan Alter about Barack Obama and Franklin D. Roosevelt.
469	"It's Alive!"	Yo-Yo Ma	"Hey, Dunkin' Donuts! America does not run on Dunkin. You guys owe me a new gas tank. This is The Colbert Report."	October 27	4138
Stephen begins by discussing John McCain's guarantee of victory in the presidential election. He then talks about some prominent conservatives distancing themselves from McCain's campaign. In the "Alpha Dog of the Week" segment, Stephen profiles a man who named his daughter Sarah McCain Palin Ciptak. Next, he interviews Yo-Yo Ma about his new album, Songs of Joy and Peace. Finally, Yo-Yo Ma performs his new song, "Panxolina."
470	"None"	Brian Moore, Sherman Alexie	"The following was supposed to contain brief nudity. Thanks a lot, network. This is The Colbert Report."	October 28	4139
Stephen discusses Ted Stevens being found guilty of seven felonies. He then talks about Republicans claiming that Barack Obama is a socialist and interviews the Socialist Party USA candidate for president, Brian Moore. Next, Stephen retracts his claim that Canton, Texas is a terrible place and says Canton, Ohio is much worse. Finally, he interviews Sherman Alexie about Native Americans.
471	"I Endorse Barack Obama"	David Simon	"I don't pay attention to polls, I just count lawn signs, so get ready for President Re/Max. This is The Colbert Report."	October 29	4140
Stephen begins by claiming that John McCain is doing so badly in the polls because it is part of a prank. In "The Wørd," he joins other conservatives and endorses Barack Obama for president, although it is mainly to get attention and say he will not actually vote for him. In "Was It Really That Bad?", Stephen examines The Great Depression. Finally, he interviews David Simon about The Wire and Generation Kill.
472	"None"	Wilco	"Hey kids, if you need a last minute costume idea, you can always go door-to-door as a McCain campaigner. This is The Colbert Report."	October 30	4141
Stephen talks about Barack Obama's 30-minute infomercial. In "Tip of the Hat, Wag of the Finger," he wags his finger at Apple, Switzerland and Barack Obama. In "The DaColbert Code," he unwillingly predicts that Obama will win the presidential election. He then interviews Jeff Tweedy of Wilco about the election and his band. Finally, Wilco performs an exclusive song.

=== November ===
No.	"The Wørd"	Guest(s)	Introductory phrase	Original release date	Prod. code
473	"None"	Charlie Cook, Andrew Sullivan	"You're watching the best political team on my show. This is The Colbert Report."	November 3	4142
Stephen starts off by announcing the winners and losers of the presidential election and interviews Charlie Cook about the election. He then shows a 1950s-style educational video about becoming a maverick. Stephen then interviews Andrew Sullivan about his support for Barack Obama. Finally, he prays for a John McCain victory.
474	"N/A"	N/A	N/A	November 4	4143
This was not a regular episode, but part of Comedy Central's Indecision 2008 live election night special.
475	"Change"	Andrew Young	"I didn't vote. If I wanted to stand in line for hours, I would be an audience member at my show. This is The Colbert Report."	November 5	4144
Stephen begins by discussing the election of Barack Obama as President of the United States. In "The Wørd," he argues that using fear in politics has collapsed like the housing bubble. The "ThreatDown:" 5. Sensitivity! 4. Cory Booker! 3. Universal Healthcare! 2. Barnyard Animals! 1. Black presidents! Finally, Stephen interviews Andrew Young about Obama's election. The word that appears next to Stephen in the opening credits changes to "FACTOSE INTOLERANT."
476	"None"	Rachel Maddow	"Hey, did you guys see tonight's episode of The Colbert Report? This is The Colbert Report."	November 6	4145
Stephen discusses the presidential election and presents "Un-American News: Obama Edition," focusing on the world's reaction to Barack Obama's election. In "Stephen Colbert's Fallback Position," he interviews Peter Earnest about being a spy. Stephen then interviews Rachel Maddow about her show, politics and Keith Olbermann. Finally, he wishes a happy birthday to his mother and leads the audience in a Latin rendition of "Happy Birthday to You."
477	"None"	Dan Savage, Kevin Johnson	"What is the sound of one me talking? This is The Colbert Report."	November 11	4146
Stephen briefly talks about the meeting of President Bush and President-elect Obama. He then discusses the fallout over the Proposition 8 outcome and interviews Dan Savage about it. He then shows the second part of "Stephen Colbert's Fallback Position," in which he learns how to be a spy. Finally, Stephen interviews Kevin Johnson about politics and his plans for Sacramento, California.
478	"Pity Party"	Bob Woodward	"Hey, teleprompter! Stop telling me what to do. 'Pause, then yell.' This is The Colbert Report."	November 12	4147
Stephen mentions a shortage of sperm donors in Britain and introduces a new product, Stephen Colbert's Formula 4OU1. He then discusses Barack Obama winning one electoral vote from Nebraska's 2nd congressional district, further adding to the Republicans' problems. In "Cheating Death with Dr. Stephen T. Colbert, D.F.A.," he talks about women's health, heart health and the Bee Gees' "Stayin' Alive" being used to perform CPR ideally. Finally, Stephen interviews Bob Woodward about the Bush administration.
479	"None"	Stephen Moore, Joe Quesada	"Hey, single malt Scotch! You're thirty years old. When are you going to settle down and get married...to my stomach? This is The Colbert Report."	November 13	4148
Stephen again discusses the fallout from Proposition 8. In "Tip of the Hat, Wag of the Finger," Stephen wags his finger at Pope Benedict XVI and Julian Norridge, and tips his hat to, and wags his finger at, Marvel Comics. He then discusses Rahm Emanuel being named President-elect Obama's Chief of Staff. Stephen then interviews Stephen Moore about economics. Finally, Stephen attempts to get President-elect Obama to come on his show by autographing a Spider-Man comic book, and gets cover artist Joe Quesada to sign it also.
480	"None"	Tom Brokaw, Malcolm Gladwell	"If your Colbert Report lasts more than half an hour, consult your physician. This is The Colbert Report."	November 17	4149
Stephen discusses his appearance on Good Morning America and his upcoming Christmas special. He then talks about President-elect Obama's potential Cabinet picks and interviews Tom Brokaw about it. He then discusses dueling advertisements between Campbell's Soup and Progresso. Finally, Stephen interviews Malcolm Gladwell about why certain people become successful.
481	"Love Lost"	Paul Simon	"If you ever forget to watch my show, just try this handy mnemonic. Watch. My. Show. This is The Colbert Report."	November 18	4150
Stephen briefly mentions Joe Lieberman being allowed to remain in the Democratic caucus. He then discusses the words "peace and love" not being part of the presidential campaign. He then talks about Hillary Clinton possibly becoming the next Secretary of State and airs the first part of his interview with Cliff Sloan about the vetting process. Stephen then interviews Paul Simon about his career and his new book, Lyrics. Finally, Simon performs "American Tune."
482	"Mad Men"	Michael Lewis	"Sarah Palin's getting a book deal, which means Wasilla is getting a bookstore! This is The Colbert Report."	November 19	4151
Stephen begins by discussing the problems of the Big Three automakers and how the free market isn't to blame. He then talks about President-elect Obama's reported nomination of Eric Holder to United States Attorney General and airs the second part of his interview with Cliff Sloan. Finally, Stephen interviews Michael Lewis about the 2008 financial crisis.
483	"None"	Cory Booker, Thomas Friedman	"It's my last show before Thanksgiving, so I'm going to pardon my turkey. I'm puttin' pardon my stomach and pardon some sandwiches. This is The Colbert Report."	November 20	4152
Stephen begins by declaring racism over after the election of Barack Obama and interviews Cory Booker about it. In "Stephen Colbert's meTunes," he discusses new albums from John Legend, Toby Keith and Guns N' Roses. Stephen then interviews Thomas Friedman about the environment. Finally, Stephen plugs his upcoming Christmas special.

=== December ===
No.	"The Wørd"	Guest(s)	Introductory phrase	Original release date	Prod. code
484	"None"	Khaled Hosseini, Roland Fryer	"I'm back from Thanksgiving break. Now you have something to be thankful for. This is The Colbert Report."	December 1	4153
Stephen complains that the soundtrack to A Colbert Christmas is behind Kanye West's new album on the iTunes chart. He then interviews Khaled Hosseini about the War in Afghanistan. In "Tip of the Hat, Wag of the Finger: All Wag Christmas Edition," he wags his finger at the National Toy Hall of Fame, Barbie and Order of St. Nick greeting cards. Finally, Stephen interviews Roland Fryer about education.
485	"A Man Named Plaxico"	Jeffrey Goldberg	"If you're looking for an inexpensive way to heat your home, might I suggest a grease fire? This is The Colbert Report."	December 2	4154
Stephen briefly mentions the 2008 financial crisis and again talks about Kanye West beating him on the iTunes chart. He then discusses Plaxico Burress accidentally shooting himself in the thigh. In "Colbert Platinum: Christmas Gift Edition," he talks about a bulletproof polo shirt, giant white truffles, transforming your backyard into a Dallas Cowboys end zone and a pure gold calendar. Stephen then interviews Jeffrey Goldberg about airline security. Finally, Stephen announces the boots he wore in A Colbert Christmas are being auctioned on eBay.
486	"Barack-Handed Compliment"	Barbara Walters	"Portions of this show may have been pre-recorded. I've done so many, it's hard to remember. This is The Colbert Report."	December 3	4155
Stephen talks about a spider escaping on the International Space Station. He then reluctantly praises President-elect Obama's picks for his Cabinet. In "Nailed 'Em," he profiles a woman who was stopped at the Canada–United States border because of her "radical knitting." Finally, Stephen interviews Barbara Walters about her upcoming television special.
487	"None"	Bob Graham, Nicholas Wade	"Only 21 more 'can't afford to go shopping' days until Christmas. This is The Colbert Report."	December 4	4156
Stephen talks about his "feud" with Kanye West and brags that A Colbert Christmas is now ahead of West's album on the iTunes charts. He then interviews Bob Graham about a potential biological weapons attack on America. In "Movies That Are Destroying America," he profiles Yes Man, Revolutionary Road and Miracle on 34th Street. Finally, Stephen interviews Nicholas Wade about using DNA to clone a woolly mammoth.
488	"Season of Giving"	Geoffrey Canada	"I don't want to let the cat out of the bag. That cat knows what it did and it needs to be punished. This is The Colbert Report."	December 8	4157
Stephen briefly mentions Barbra Streisand kissing President Bush. He then talks about a potential government bailout of the Big Three U.S. automakers. Stephen then discusses Congresswoman Ileana Ros-Lehtinen unknowingly hanging up on President-elect Obama. Finally, he interviews Geoffrey Canada about his work with the Harlem Children's Zone.
489	"None"	Kevin Bacon, Charlie Kaufman	"I am calling for an auto bailout...because I drove my car into a lake. This is The Colbert Report."	December 9	4158
Stephen briefly mentions the arrest and indictment of Illinois Governor Rod Blagojevich. He then shows off The Colbert Report Christmas tree and his "Nixmas Tree" and Nixon menorah. This leads to a discussion on Frost/Nixon and he interviews Kevin Bacon about the film. As a prelude to Thursday's new episode of Tek Jansen, Stephen shows the previous installment. Finally, he interviews Charlie Kaufman about his new film, Synecdoche, New York.
490	"None"	Richard Haass	"Remember the old adage: starve a cold, feed a fever, behead a zombie. This is The Colbert Report."	December 10	4159
Stephen discusses the arrest of Illinois Governor Rod Blagojevich. The "ThreatDown:" 5. China! 4. Asteroids! 3. Time! 2. Pole-Dancing Robots! 1. Happiness! He then talks about potential pardons by President Bush. He brings out the "On Notice" board and pardons several items, regrets it, and puts "Forgiveness" on the board. Finally, Stephen interviews Richard Haass about foreign policy issues that President-elect Obama could face.
491	"The Unbearable Lightness Of Supreme Being"	Michael Phelps	(sings) "It's Beginning to Look a Lot Like Christmas everywhere I go, (speaks) possibly because I live in Macy's. This is The Colbert Report."	December 11	4160
Stephen is angry that some astronomers claim Jesus was born in June and complains about atheists. He is then visited by the ghost of his former stage manager, Bobby, which Stephen says proves the existence of God. He then interviews Michael Phelps about his career and new book, No Limits: The Will to Succeed. Finally, Stephen eats the ghost of Bobby.
