= 76th Directors Guild of America Awards =

- Date: February 10, 2024
- Location: The Beverly Hilton, Beverly Hills, California
- Country: United States
- Presented by: Directors Guild of America
- Hosted by: Judd Apatow

Highlights
- Best Director Feature Film: Oppenheimer – Christopher Nolan
- Best Director Documentary: 20 Days in Mariupol – Mstyslav Chernov
- Best Director First-Time Feature Film: Past Lives – Celine Song

The 76th Directors Guild of America Awards, honoring the outstanding directorial achievement in feature films, documentary, television and commercials of 2023, were presented on February 10, 2024, at the Beverly Hilton in Beverly Hills, California. The ceremony was hosted by Judd Apatow, who previously hosted the ceremonies in 2018, 2020, 2022, and 2023. The nominations for the television and documentary categories were announced on January 9, 2024, while the nominations for the feature film categories were announced on January 10, 2024.

== Winners and nominees ==
=== Film ===
Feature Film

Christopher Nolan – Oppenheimer

- Greta Gerwig – Barbie
- Yorgos Lanthimos – Poor Things
- Alexander Payne – The Holdovers
- Martin Scorsese – Killers of the Flower Moon
Documentaries

Mstyslav Chernov – 20 Days in Mariupol

- Moses Bwayo and Christopher Sharp – Bobi Wine: The People's President
- Madeleine Gavin – Beyond Utopia
- Davis Guggenheim – Still: A Michael J. Fox Movie
- D. Smith – Kokomo City
First-Time Feature Film

Celine Song – Past Lives

- Cord Jefferson – American Fiction
- Manuela Martelli – Chile '76
- Noora Niasari – Shayda
- A. V. Rockwell – A Thousand and One

=== Television ===
Drama Series

Peter Hoar – The Last of Us for "Long, Long Time" (HBO)

- Becky Martin – Succession for "Rehearsal" (HBO)
- Mark Mylod – Succession for "Connor's Wedding" (HBO)
- Andrij Parekh – Succession for "America Decides" (HBO)
- Robert Pulcini and Shari Springer Berman – Succession for "Tailgate Party" (HBO)
Comedy Series

Christopher Storer – The Bear for "Fishes" (FX / Hulu)

- Erica Dunton – Ted Lasso for "La Locker Room Aux Folles" (Apple TV+)
- Bill Hader – Barry for "wow" (HBO)
- Declan Lowney – Ted Lasso for "So Long, Farewell" (Apple TV+)
- Ramy Youssef – The Bear for "Honeydew" (FX / Hulu)
Movies for Television and Limited Series

Sarah Adina Smith – Lessons in Chemistry for "Her and Him" (Apple TV+)

- Shawn Levy – All the Light We Cannot See (Netflix)
- Tara Miele – Lessons in Chemistry for "Introduction to Chemistry" (Apple TV+)
- Millicent Shelton – Lessons in Chemistry for "Poirot" (Apple TV+)
- Nzingha Stewart – Daisy Jones & the Six for "Track 10: Rock 'n' Roll Suicide" (Prime Video)
Variety/Talk/News/Sports – Regularly Scheduled Programming

Michael Mancini and Liz Patrick – Saturday Night Live for "Pedro Pascal / Coldplay" (NBC)

- Paul G. Casey – Real Time with Bill Maher for "Episode 2117" (HBO)
- Jim Hoskinson – The Late Show with Stephen Colbert for "Jan. 19, 2023: Rep. Adam Kinzinger; Meet Me at the Altar; Special appearance by Harvey Guillén" (CBS)
- David Paul Meyer – The Daily Show with Trevor Noah for "Singer Charley Crockett Performs "Name on a Billboard" and Discusses New Album with Jordan Klepper" (Comedy Central)
- Paul Pennolino – Last Week Tonight with John Oliver for "Dollar Stores" (HBO)
Variety/Talk/News/Sports – Specials

Paul Miller – Carol Burnett: 90 Years of Laughter + Love (NBC)

- Joel Gallen – Chris Rock: Selective Outrage (Netflix)
- Stan Lathan – Dave Chappelle: The Dreamer (Netflix)
- Linda Mendoza – Wanda Sykes: I'm an Entertainer (Netflix)
- Glenn Weiss – The 95th Annual Academy Awards (ABC)
Reality Programs

Niharika Desai – Rainn Wilson and the Geography of Bliss for "Happiness is a Bottle of Cod Liver Oil" (Peacock)

- Ken Fuchs – The Golden Bachelor for "Premiere" (ABC)
- Joseph Guidry and Alexandra Lipsitz – Project Greenlight: A New Generation for "PGL vs. Gray Matter Problem" (HBO)
- Rich Kim – Lego Masters for "Is It Brick?" (Fox)
- Patrick McManus – American Ninja Warrior for "Season 15 Finale" (NBC)
Children's Programs

Amy Schatz – Stand Up & Shout: Songs from a Philly High School (HBO)

- James Bobin – Percy Jackson and the Olympians for "I Accidentally Vaporize My Pre-Algebra Teacher" (Disney+)
- Destin Daniel Cretton – American Born Chinese for "What Guy Are You" (Disney+)
- Rob Letterman – Goosebumps for "Say Cheese and Die" (Disney+ / Hulu)
- Dinh Thai – American Born Chinese for "A Monkey on a Quest" (Disney+)

=== Commercials ===
Commercials

Kim Gehrig – Apple's "Run This Town" and Expedia's "The Travelers"

- Martin de Thurah – Levi's' "Fair Exchange" and "Legends Never Die"
- Seb Edwards – Battle of the Baddest's "Rumble"
- Craig Gillespie – Apple's "Waiting Room"
- Andreas Nilsson – Apple's "R.I.P. Leon" and "Action Mode", Les Mills' "Choose Happy" and Snapchat's "Wait'll You See This"

=== Lifetime Achievement in Television ===
- David Nutter

=== Frank Capra Achievement Award ===
- Janet Knutsen

=== Franklin J. Schaffner Achievement Award ===
- Gary Natoli
