= Man Seeks God =

2011 book by Eric Weiner

- First edition
- Author: Eric Weiner
- Language: English
- Genre: Nonfiction
- Publisher: Hachette (Twelve Books)
- Publication date: December 2011
- Publication place: United States
- Media type: Print
- Pages: 368 pages (1st Edition Hardcover)

Man Seeks God: My Flirtations with the Divine is a book written by Eric Weiner, a former NPR Correspondent and author of The Geography of Bliss. When a health scare puts him in the hospital, Weiner, an agnostic, finds himself tangling with an unexpected question, posed to him by a well-meaning nurse. "Have you found your God yet?"

Weiner, a longtime "spiritual voyeur" and inveterate traveler, realizes that while he has been privy to a wide range of religious practices, he has never seriously considered these concepts in his own life. Face to face with his own mortality, and spurred on by the question of what spiritual principles to impart to his young daughter, he decides to correct this omission, undertaking a worldwide exploration of religions and hoping to come, if he can, to a personal understanding of the divine.

== Critic reaction ==
Says The New York Times: "Books about God tend to fall into two categories: objective inquiries into the nature of belief and personal tales of spiritual awakening…[Weiner] nimbly and often hilariously straddles the fence between the two genres ... He’s Woody Allen channeling Karen Armstrong."

"[Weiner's] sophisticated wit and wordplay yield an engaging tale at each stop." - Time.com

"Well-researched, informative and engaging, Man Seeks God is packed with facts and wisdom that, regardless of which God you root for, will leave what a Buddhist friend of Weiner’s calls “Post-it Notes on the brain." - The Washington Post

Was made the National Geographic Traveler Book of the Month (Dec. 2011).

== Media appearances ==
- PBS NewsHour: In 'Man Seeks God,' Author Eric Weiner Hunts for Divine Meaning
- National Public Radio Morning Edition: Seeks God, Finds Wayne of Staten Island
- Time magazine online: Eric Weiner's "Ikea God"
