= Liberace (surname) =

Liberace is a surname. Notable people the name include:

- Władziu Valentino Liberace (1919–1987), known mononymously as Liberace, American pianist, singer, and actor
- George Liberace (1911–1983), American musician and television performer
- Robert Liberace (born 1967), American painter
