= Rainn Wilson and the Geography of Bliss =

Television series

- Genre: Travel documentary
- Created by: Casey Scharf
- Based on: The Geography of Bliss: One Grump's Search for the Happiest Places in the World by Eric Weiner
- Directed by: Niharika Desai
- Presented by: Rainn Wilson
- No. of seasons: 1
- No. of episodes: 5

Production
- Executive producers: Melissa Wood, Casey Scharf, Evan Rosenfeld, Jen Isaacson, Dave Sirulnick, Jon Kamen
- Cinematography: Carrie Cheek, Kyle Marchant
- Production companies: Panama Hat, RadicalMedia, Dukes Up, Imperial Mammoth

Original release
- Network: Peacock
- Release: May 18, 2023

Rainn Wilson and the Geography of Bliss is an American comedy documentary series that premiered on NBC's Peacock in May 2023 and on MSNBC in July 2023.

The series follows actor and comedian Rainn Wilson as he travels the world in search of the science and psychology of what makes some places happier than others.

The series was created and written by Casey Scharf and is based upon Eric Weiner's New York Times Best Selling book The Geography of Bliss: One Grump's Search for the Happiest Places in the World.

== Episodes ==
The first season consists of five, one-hour episodes.

- "Iceland: Happiness Is A Bottle of Cod Liver Oil"
- "Bulgaria: Happiness Is A Stranger's Shower"
- "Ghana: Happiness Is A Condom Box Burial"
- "Thailand: Happiness Is Quieting Your @#$%^&* Mind"
- "Los Angeles: Happiness Is A Piñata Full of Rodents"

== Reception ==
=== Critical response ===
The series has a 100% rating on the review aggregator website Rotten Tomatoes, with Fletcher Peters of The Daily Beast writing "Out of all the travel shows I’ve watched (besides Anthony Bourdain: Parts Unknown), this is the most intriguing concept of the bunch."

=== Accolades ===
In 2023, the series was nominated for a Critics' Choice Television Award and a Realscreen Award.

In 2024, the show's director, Niharika Desai, won the Directors Guild of America Award for Outstanding Directorial Achievement in Reality Programs for the series' premiere episode.
