= Marc Pachter =

American museum director (1943–2024)

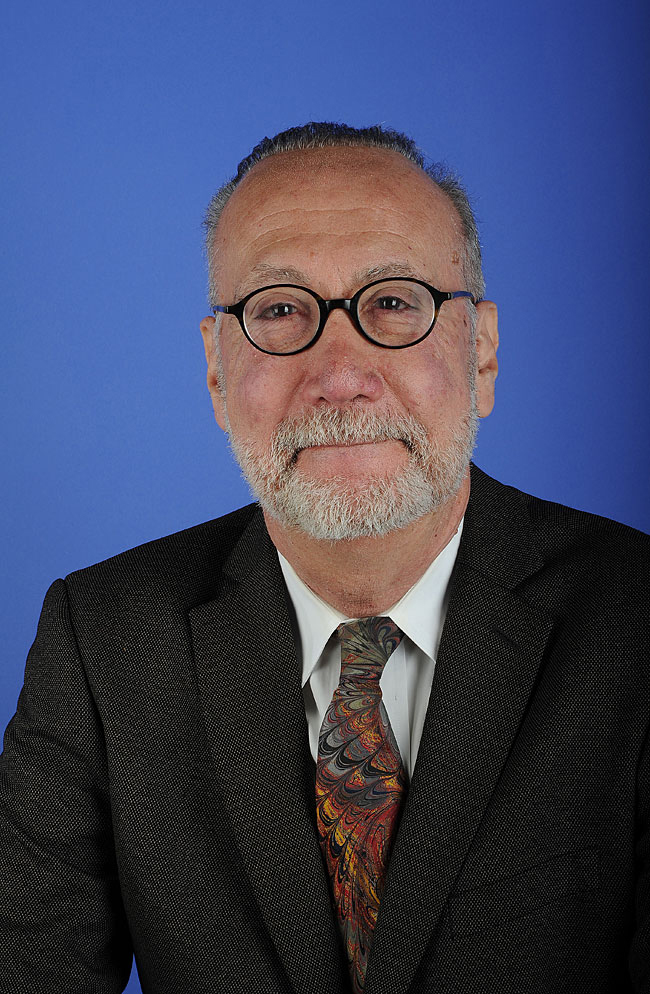
- Born: May 7, 1943; New York City, U.S.
- Died: February 17, 2024 (aged 80); Bangkok, Thailand
- Occupation: Museum director

Marc Jay Pachter (May 7, 1943 – February 17, 2024) was an American museum director who headed up the United States National Portrait Gallery from 2000 until 2007 and was the acting director (after coming back out of retirement) of the National Museum of American History between 2011 and 2012, both at the Smithsonian.

Pacter was born in the Bronx to Jack and Ferle (Greenfield) Pachter, and moved with them to California at age one. He earned a bachelor's degree in political science from the University of California, Berkeley in 1964, and enrolled as a Woodrow Wilson Fellow at Harvard University as a graduate student in American history.

While at the NPG, Pachter oversaw a $300 million renovation of the museum's building, and played an instrumental role in acquiring the Lansdowne Portrait by Gilbert Stuart of George Washington for the museum. When he retired as director of the National Portrait Gallery in 2007, the Gallery in turn commissioned a portrait by Robert Liberace of Pachter.

Pachter gave a talk entitled "The Art of the Interview" at the EG conference in January 2008; a video of the talk is posted on the TED website.

In February 2008, Pachter was a guest on The Colbert Report, in which he discussed with Stephen Colbert the host's portrait hanging in the National Portrait Gallery and the effect it was having upon attendance at the museum.

Pachter died of a heart attack during an extended stay in Bangkok on February 17, 2024, at the age of 80.
