= Frank Wright (painter) =

American printmaker and painter (1932-2020)

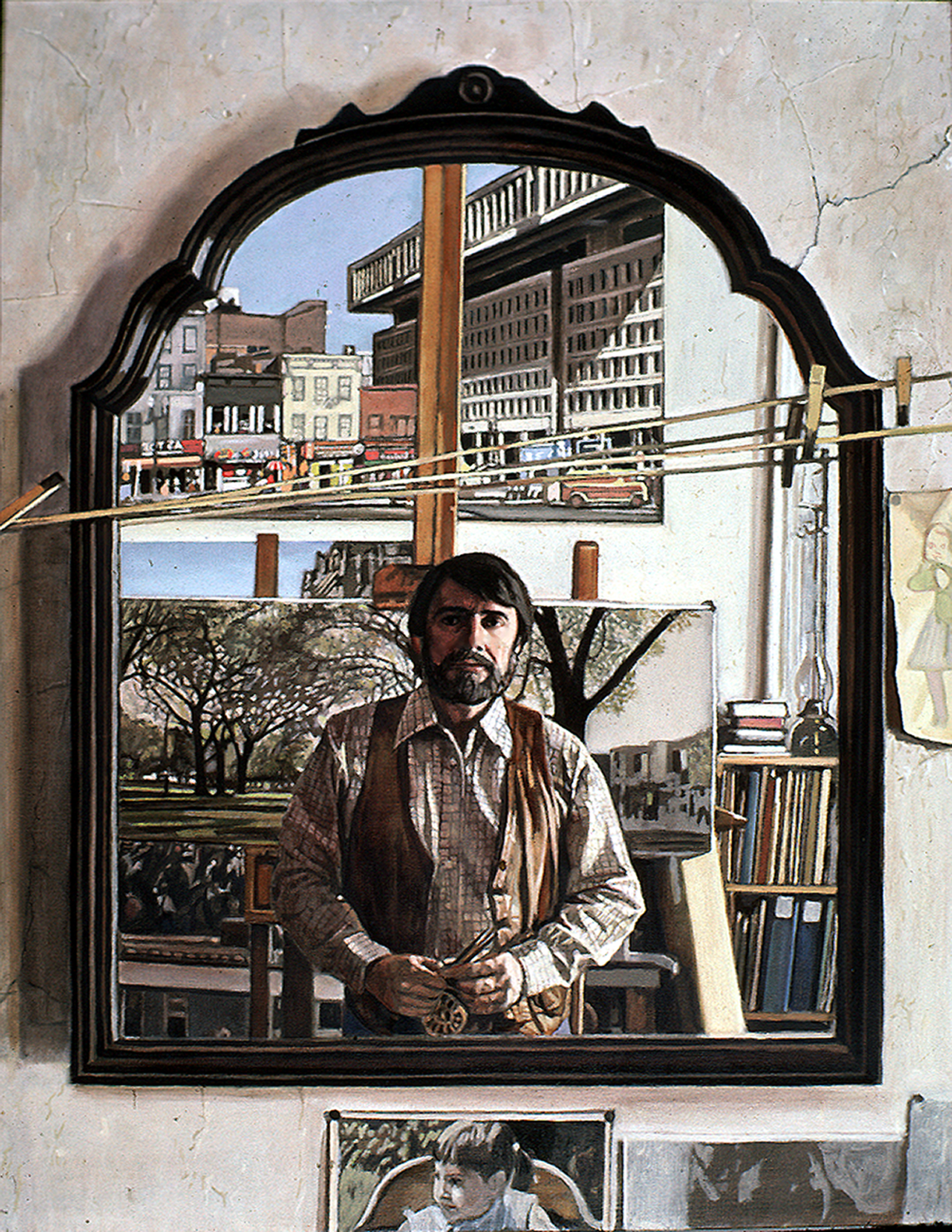
- Wright, mirror image (self portrait)
- Born: October 10, 1932
- Died: August 9, 2020 (aged 87)
- Occupation: Painter
- Spouse: Mary Dow Wright
- Children: 1

Frank Wright (1932 – August 9, 2020) was an American painter, professor of art for many years at George Washington University, and sixth-generation Washingtonian.

== Early life and education ==
Wright was born in Washington, D.C. He attended DC Public Schools graduating from Eastern High School in 1950. From there, he attended American University on a scholarship from the National Society of Arts and Letters and received his BA, in 1954. He then went on to do studies and research at the Berenson Villa I Tatti in Florence, (1956-1958) and post-graduate work at the Fogg Museum at Harvard University (1960-1961). The study he undertook at Bernard Berenson's Tuscan residence was on the relationship of Florentine painting to the Florentine theatre in the Quattrocento. He received his master's degree in Art-History from the University of Illinois.

== Career ==
As a painter, Wright's work has been exhibited widely. His work was the subject of a solo exhibition, "Frank Wright: Paintings, Prints, Drawings" at Adams, Davidson Galleries, Washington, DC, which ran from May 6 until June 7, 1975, and of several solo exhibitions at the Kennedy Gallery also in WDC. He had a solo museum exhibition entitled "Frank Wright: Paintings 1968-1980" at the Corcoran Gallery of Art, in Washington, DC, which was on display from June 13 until July 19, 1981. From 1970-2015, he was a professor of art at George Washington University, where his students included the noted painter, sculptor, and draughtsman Robert Liberace who credits Wright with having instilled into him a love of the old masters. In his career, he produced 220 pieces of Art.

== Personal life ==
He married Mary Dow Wright and they have a daughter Suzanne Wright. He died on August 9, 2020.
