= Niharika Desai =

Niharika Desai (born c. 1977) is a television editor and a VJ on MTV Desi.

She grew up in Poughkeepsie, New York, and graduated from the University of Pennsylvania.

In 2024 she won the Directors Guild of America Award for Outstanding Directorial Achievement in Reality Programs for directing “Happiness is a Bottle of Cod Liver Oil” from Rainn Wilson and the Geography of Bliss.
