= Philip Weiss =

American journalist

- Born: 12 August 1955 (age 71)
- Education: Harvard College (BA)
- Occupations: Journalist, Writer
- Known for: Creator and co-editor of Mondoweiss with Adam Horowitz
- Spouse: Cynthia Kling
- Website: mondoweiss.net

Philip Weiss is an American journalist who co-edits Mondoweiss ("a news website devoted to covering American foreign policy in the Middle East, chiefly from a progressive Jewish perspective") with journalist Adam Horowitz. Weiss describes himself as an anti-Zionist and rejects the label "post-Zionist."

== Career ==
Weiss is the author of the novel Cock-a-doodle-doo (1996) and the non-fiction book American Taboo: A Murder In The Peace Corps (2004). He co-edited The Goldstone Report: The Legacy of the Landmark Investigation of the Gaza Conflict (2011) with Adam Horowitz and Lizzy Ratner.

Weiss has written for Spy, New York, Harper's Magazine, Esquire, and The New York Observer.

In 2006, Weiss began writing Mondoweiss, a daily blog for The New York Observer's website that began to focus on "Jewish issues" like "the Iraq disaster and my Jewishness, Zionism, neo-conservatism, Israel, Palestine". In the spring of 2007, he began Mondoweiss as an unaffiliated blog.

Weiss, Horowitz, and Lizzy Ratner co-edited the 2011 book The Goldstone Report: The Legacy of the Landmark Investigation of the Gaza Conflict, an abridged version of the United Nations Fact Finding Mission on the Gaza Conflict. It has a foreword by Bishop Desmond Tutu and an introduction by Naomi Klein, and was reviewed by Publishers Weekly and Kirkus Reviews.

== Books ==
- 1996: Cock-a-doodle-doo
- 2004: American Taboo: A Murder In The Peace Corps
- 2011: The Goldstone Report: The Legacy of the Landmark Investigation of the Gaza Conflict, by Adam Horowitz, Lizzy Ratner, Philip Weiss, Naomi Klein, et al.
