= Brent Glass =

American public historian

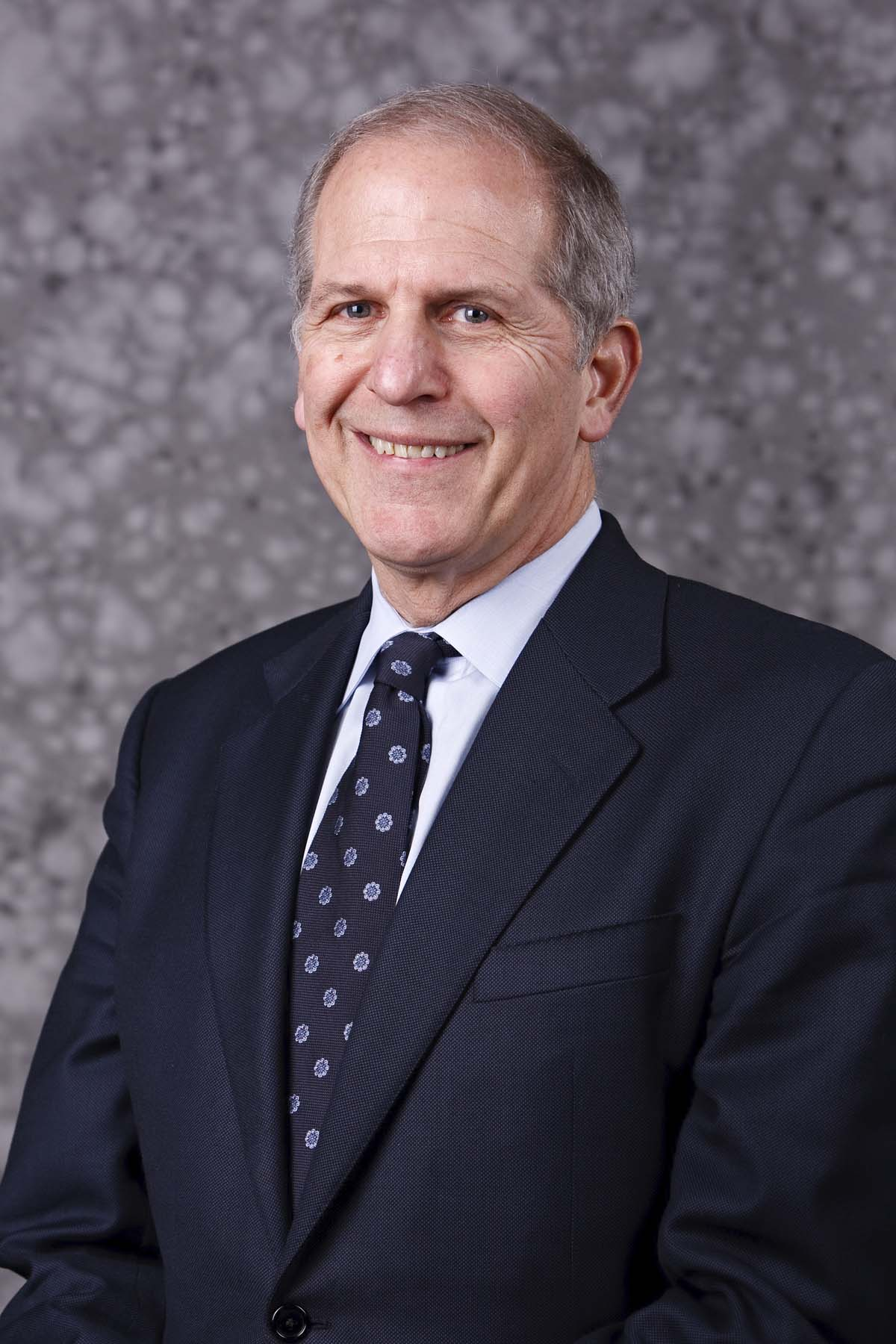
- Born: Brent D. Glass; 1947 (age 78–79); New York City, U.S.
- Education: Lafayette College; New York University; University of North Carolina-Chapel Hill; Harvard University

Brent D. Glass (born 1947) is a public historian who pioneered influential oral history and material culture studies and was Elizabeth MacMillan Director of the Smithsonian's National Museum of American History from 2002-2011. He is an author and international speaker on cultural diplomacy and museum management. He writes on topics ranging from state-of-the-museum blogs to public memory, historic literacy, historic preservation, and industrial history.

== Early life ==
Glass was born in 1947 in Brooklyn, New York City, and grew up in the village of Lynbrook in Nassau County on Long Island. Glass earned his doctorate in history from the University of North Carolina-Chapel Hill (1980), his master's degree in American Studies from New York University (1971), and his bachelor's degree from Lafayette College (1969) where he was a member of the Pi Lambda Phi fraternity. He has also completed the program for state and local government executives at Harvard University's Kennedy School. He writes on public history, public memory, historic literacy, historic preservation, industrial history and the history of Pennsylvania and North Carolina.

== Career ==
Glass was executive director of the North Carolina Humanities Council from 1983 to 1987. From 1987-2002, Glass served as executive director of the Pennsylvania Historical and Museum Commission, managing the largest and most comprehensive state history program in the country, with 25 historical sites and museums, including the State Archives and State Museum; the State Historic Preservation Office, public history programs, and historical publications. Beginning 2002, he was named the director of the National Museum of American History.

In 2008, Glass led a two-year, $85 million renovation of the National Museum of American History, revitalizing public spaces and creating a new public square on the National Mall for citizenship naturalization ceremonies and other public events. Since 2002, he has overseen conservation of the Star-Spangled Banner, creation of major new exhibitions on transportation, maritime history, military history and first ladies' gowns, installation of nearly 50 other exhibitions and hundreds of online and public programs, and the Museum has raised more than $75 million from individuals, foundations and corporations. Under Glass’ leadership, the National Museum of American History opened the popular permanent exhibitions, “America on the Move” in November 2003 and “The Price of Freedom: Americans at War” in November 2004, as well as a temporary display, “Treasures of American History,” while the museum was closed for renovations.

Glass is an active member of and consultant to the diplomatic, cultural, and academic communities. He founded Brent D. Glass LLC in 2011 as a museum and history consulting business. The firm specializes in governance, executive recruitment, fundraising, and strategic and master planning. Glass has served as a consultant to more than fifty cultural and historic organizations, including the Sing Sing Prison Museum, the Berkshire Museum, the National Railroad Hall of Fame, the National Museum of Industrial History, the Presidio, and the DeVos Institute of Arts Management.

Glass also has served on several boards and commissions including the Flight 93 Memorial Advisory Commission and the State Department's US-Russian Commission Working Group on Education, Culture, Sports and Media. He has served on the U.S. State Department Diplomatic Center Advisory Committee, the San Francisco Presidio Heritage Advisory Board, and as a trustee of Lafayette College in Easton, Pennsylvania. He has served as a Federal Commissioner of the National Historical Publications and Records Commission and on the National Council of the American Association for State and Local History. A frequent speaker and participant in public diplomacy and cultural diplomacy programs, he has made presentations about museum management, public memory and American history in France, Germany, Italy, China, Russia, Egypt, Mexico, Portugal, Lithuania, Serbia, Slovenia, Croatia, and the Czech Republic.

== Works ==
- "50 Great American Places: Essential Historic Sites Across the U.S.", Author Brent D. Glass, Foreword by David McCullough, Simon & Schuster Paperbacks, 2016, ISBN 978-1-4516-8203-8
- "Gold Mining in North Carolina: A Bicentennial History", Authors Richard F. Knapp and Brent D. Glass, North Carolina Office of Archives and History, 1999 ISBN 0865262853
- "Foreword", African Americans in Pennsylvania: shifting historical perspectives, Authors Joe William Trotter, Eric Ledell Smith, Penn State Press, 1997, ISBN 978-0-271-01687-0
- "A New South Pioneer", Discovering North Carolina: A Tar Heel Reader, Author Jack Claiborne, Editors William Price, UNC Press, 1993, ISBN 978-0-8078-4434-2
- "The Textile Industry in North Carolina: A History", Author Brent D. Glass, North Carolina Office of Archives and History, 1992, ISBN 086526256X
- Badin, a town at the Narrows: an historical and architectural survey, Authors Brent D. Glass, Pat Dickinson, Stanly County Historic Properties Commission, 1982
- "North Carolina, An Inventory of Historic Engineering and Industrial Sites" Editor Brent Glass, National Park Service, 1975
