= Julia E. Sweig =

American writer and scholar

Julia Sweig is an American writer and scholar. She is the author of the New York Times Best Seller Lady Bird Johnson: Hiding in Plain Sight, which portrays Lady Bird Johnson’s influence and power in the formidable political partnership at the center of the Lyndon B. Johnson presidency. Lady Bird Johnson: Hiding in Plain Sight was longlisted for the 2022 PEN/Jacqueline Bograd Weld Award for Biography. Sweig is also the executive producer, writer, and host of In Plain Sight: Lady Bird Johnson, an eight-episode audio documentary produced with ABC News and Best Case Studios. She is the author of several books and is currently a non-resident senior research fellow at the LBJ School of Public Affairs at the University of Texas-Austin.

Sweig is a recognized expert and scholar of US-Latin American relations and, in addition to her books, author of numerous short and long form essays on American foreign policy, especially Cuba. She wrote a column on American politics for three years in Folha, Brazil's largest daily newspaper. Previously she served as the Nelson and David Rockefeller Senior Fellow for Latin America Studies and Director for Latin America Studies at the Council on Foreign Relations and also led the Aspen Institute's congressional seminar on Latin America.

== Education ==
Sweig holds a B.A. from the University of California, Santa Cruz and an M.A. and PhD from the Johns Hopkins University School of Advanced International Studies.

== Books ==
- Lady Bird Johnson: Hiding in Plain Sight (Random House, 2021) ISBN 9780812995909
- Cuba: What Everyone Needs to Know (Oxford University Press, 2009; 2nd ed., 2012)
- Friendly Fire: Losing Friends and Making Enemies in the Anti-American Century (PublicAffairs, 2006) ISBN 1-58648-300-5
- Andes 2020: A New Strategy for the Challenges of Colombia and the Region, A Center for Preventive Action Report (Council on Foreign Relations Press, 2004) ISBN 0-87609-340-3
- Inside the Cuban Revolution: Fidel Castro and the Urban Underground (Harvard University Press, 2002) ISBN 0-674-01612-2
- U.S.-Cuban Relations in the 21st Century, A Follow-On Chairman's Report, Report of an Independent Task Force (Council on Foreign Relations Press, 2001) ISBN 0-87609-276-8
