= Robert Liberace =

American painter

Robert Liberace (born January 2, 1967, in Pomona, New York) is an American realist artist. He attended the George Washington University, from which he received both his bachelor of liberal arts and masters of fine arts degrees. There he was also a recipient of a Morris Louis scholarship. Among his teachers was the painter Frank Wright, who he credits with having instilled into him a love of the old masters. Not unlike the painter George Bellows before him, eventually Liberce gave up baseball for art.

== Biography ==
Accomplished in both sculpture and painting, as a portraitist his commissioned subjects have included the 41st President of the United States George H.W Bush, ambassador Sol Linowitz, former United States National Portrait Gallery director Marc Pachter, the National Symphony Orchestra cellist Steven Honigberg, the Shady Grove Adventist Hospital patron Farid Srour and General Wallace M. Greene, the last of which resides in the Vermont State House. His sculptural commissions include the Our Lady of Vailankanni in marble, and the terracotta rendering of Mother Teresa for the Basilica of the National Shrine of the Immaculate Conception, in Washington, D.C. He has been proclaimed by the Art Renewal Center to be one of several score of current "accredited", "living masters". In 2003 the National Portrait Society awarded him their grand prize.

Liberace's work has been written about extensively by M. Stephen Dougherty, the executive editor of American Artist magazine. He teaches at Studio Incamminati in Philadelphia, which was founded and headed by the late renowned painter Nelson Shanks, and the Art League in Alexandria, Virginia. He also holds painting and sculpture workshops in locations throughout the United States and abroad. Of his painting "The Fifth Circle" Liberace has said ..."fascination with the active human figure and my desire to capture the power and poetry that results from the detailed description of the body in dramatic poses. The painting also explores both the interesting visual effects of light and the narrative power that light embodies. Dante's Inferno provides the inspiration for this painting and the dark underworld he envisions creates a fiery backdrop for the action. The burning shoreline creates an apocalyptic atmosphere representing the darker realms of the human soul. The flames illuminate one side of the ferryman with a sharp searing light as he moves toward a contrasting cooler light shining in from the opposite side. This clear softer light evokes a desire of the soul to seek Paradise".

== Personal life ==
Robert Liberace resides in Vienna, Virginia, with his wife, the painter and illustrator Lina Liberace (nee Chesak). Their two daughters Ava and Celia are also both visual artists . He is distantly related to the famed pianist Liberace.

His mother is the poet Maire Liberace whose second book of verse "Lament in a Minor Key" was named "Book of the Year" by the Rockland County Library Association for 2019.
