= Eric Weiner =

American author and public speaker

- Education: University of Maryland and Stanford University
- Occupation: Author

Eric Weiner is an American author and public speaker. He is best known for The Geography of Bliss, Man Seeks God, The Geography of Genius and The Socrates Express. Weiner's books have been translated into more than 20 languages. He is a former foreign correspondent for NPR and the author of articles for travel and culture. He spent a decade overseas for NPR, based in New Delhi, Jerusalem and Tokyo.

== Early life ==
Weiner grew up in Baltimore, Maryland. He obtained his degree from the University of Maryland and, in 2003, was a Knight Journalism Fellow at Stanford University.

== Career ==
From 1989 to 1991, Weiner worked as a business reporter for The New York Times.

In 1992, Weiner joined NPR, working for their Washington Bureau until 1994. While there he was given work with an emphasis on business and economics. He then joined the Foreign Desk. In 1993, NPR sent Weiner to India and he was the network's first full-time correspondent in that country. While in New Delhi for two years, he covered the bubonic plague, India's economic reforms, and many others. In 1994 he was awarded the Angel Award for his coverage of Islamic issues in Asia. From 1995 until 1999 he was based in Jerusalem as NPR's Middle East Correspondent, and was part of the team of NPR reporters who won a special citation in the 1998 Overseas Press Club for their coverage of Israel's 50th anniversary.

He has reported from over 30 countries. His essays and commentary have appeared in The New York Times, the Los Angeles Times, Slate, The New Republic, AFAR magazine, BBC.com and many other publications. While with NPR, he has also served as a correspondent in New York City, Miami, and Washington, DC.

== Works ==
In his first book The Geography of Bliss, Weiner traveled to spots around the globe—including Iceland, Bhutan, Moldova and Qatar—to search out how different countries define and pursue happiness. The book was made into a six-part docu-series, featuring actor Rainn Wilson, which premiered on May 18, 2023 on NBC's Peacock streaming service.

In The Socrates Express, Weiner follows in the footsteps of some of history's greatest thinkers—ranging from Epicurus to Thoreau to Confucius to Simone Weil—and offers practical and spiritual lessons for today's unsettled times. Weiner travels mostly by train to pilgrimage to the places around the world where these thinkers lived and where their ideas resonate today, making stops in Athens, Delhi, Wyoming, Kyoto, Frankfurt, Coney Island and places in between.

Publishers Weekly says that Weiner in The Socrates Express "makes a convincing and winningly presented case for the practical applications of philosophy to everyday existence in the 21st century. With humor and thoughtfulness, he distills the wisdom of thinkers from throughout history....His book offers an appealing way to cope with the din of modern life and look at the world with attentive eyes and ears." Booklist gives The Socrates Express a starred review.

In The Geography of Genius, Weiner travels from Athens to Silicon Valley, and throughout history, to show how creative genius flourishes in specific places at specific times. Walter Isaacson, bestselling author of Steve Jobs and The Innovators, says, "Why do certain places produce a spontaneous eruption of creativity? What made Athens and Florence and Silicon Valley? This witty and fun book has an insight in every paragraph. It’s a charming mix of history and wisdom cloaked as a rollicking travelogue filled with colorful characters.”

Dan Gilbert, Harvard professor and author of the bestseller Stumbling on Happiness, calls The Geography of Genius "an intellectual odyssey, a traveler’s diary, and a comic novel all rolled into one. Smart, original, and utterly delightful, this is Weiner’s best book yet.” The Wall Street Journal review said that “There are some writers whose company is worth keeping, whatever the subject… And Mr. Weiner is blessed with this gift. He is a prober and questioner, a big-hearted humanist who will always take a colorful, contradictory reality over some unfounded certainty.”

In Man Seeks God, he explores his spiritual restlessness and asks some fundamental questions: "Where do we come from? What happens when we die? How should we live our lives? Where do all the missing socks go?"

== Bibliography ==
- Weiner, Eric (2008-01-03). The Geography of Bliss: One Grump's Search for the Happiest Places in the World. Grand Central Publishing. ISBN 978-0-446-51107-0.
- Weiner, Eric (2011-12-05). Man Seeks God: My Flirtations with the Divine. Grand Central Publishing. ISBN 978-1-4555-0570-8.
- Weiner, Eric (2016-01-05). The Geography of Genius: A Search for the World's Most Creative Places from Ancient Athens to Silicon Valley. Simon and Schuster. ISBN 978-1-4516-9168-9.
- Weiner, Eric (2020-08-25). The Socrates Express: In Search of Life Lessons from Dead Philosophers. Simon and Schuster. ISBN 978-1-5011-2901-8.

== Honors and awards ==
Weiner is the recipient of the Borders Original Voices Award and a finalist for the Barnes & Noble Discover Award. He was a part of a team that won a Peabody award for investigative work covering the US tobacco industry. In 2022, his book The Socrates Express was awarded the Towson University Literature Prize.

== Personal ==
Weiner is married; he and his wife have one daughter who was adopted from Kazakhstan. The family resides near Washington, DC.
