= The Geography of Bliss =

2008 travel memoir

- Author: Eric Weiner
- Language: English
- Genre: Nonfiction
- Publisher: Hachette (Twelve Books)
- Publication date: January 2008
- Publication place: United States
- Media type: Print
- Pages: 329 pages (1st Edition Hardcover)
- ISBN: 0-446-58026-0
- OCLC: 164803474
- Dewey Decimal: 910.4 22
- LC Class: G465 .W435 2008

The Geography of Bliss: One Grump's Search for the Happiest Places in the World is the New York Times-bestselling humorous travel memoir by longtime National Public Radio foreign correspondent Eric Weiner. In the book, Weiner travels to spots around the globe—including Iceland, Bhutan, Moldova and Qatar—to search out how different countries define and pursue happiness.

According to Kirkus Reviews, the book is "Part travelogue, part personal-discovery memoir....reads like Paul Theroux channeling David Sedaris on a particularly good day."

== Media Appearances ==
- Interview on The Diane Rehm Show
- Colbert Report interview
- Nightline interview
