= List of The New York Times number-one books of 2007 =

The American daily newspaper The New York Times publishes multiple weekly lists ranking the best selling books in the United States. The lists are split into three genres—fiction, nonfiction and children's books. Both the fiction and nonfiction lists are further split into multiple lists.

== Fiction ==
The following list ranks the number-one best selling fiction books, in the hardcover fiction category.

The most popular books of the year were A Thousand Splendid Suns, by Khaled Hosseini with 13 weeks at the top. The author James Patterson was at the top for five different books.

Date	Book	Author
January 7	For One More Day	Mitch Albom
January 14	For One More Day	Mitch Albom
January 21	For One More Day	Mitch Albom
January 28	Plum Lovin'	Janet Evanovich
February 4	Plum Lovin'	Janet Evanovich
February 11	Plum Lovin'	Janet Evanovich
February 18	Plum Lovin'	Janet Evanovich
February 25	Step on a Crack	James Patterson
March 4	Step on a Crack	James Patterson
March 11	Innocent in Death	J. D. Robb
March 18	Shopaholic and Baby	Sophie Kinsella
March 25	Nineteen Minutes	Jodi Picoult
April 1	Nineteen Minutes	Jodi Picoult
April 8	Nineteen Minutes	Jodi Picoult
April 15	Nineteen Minutes	Jodi Picoult
April 22	I Heard That Song Before	Mary Higgins Clark
April 29	I Heard That Song Before	Mary Higgins Clark
May 6	The Children of Húrin	J. R. R. Tolkien
May 13	Simple Genius	David Baldacci
May 20	Simple Genius	David Baldacci
May 27	The 6th Target	James Patterson and Maxine Paetro
June 3	The 6th Target	James Patterson and Maxine Paetro
June 10	A Thousand Splendid Suns	Khaled Hosseini
June 17	A Thousand Splendid Suns	Khaled Hosseini
June 24	A Thousand Splendid Suns	Khaled Hosseini
July 1	A Thousand Splendid Suns	Khaled Hosseini
July 8	Lean Mean Thirteen	Janet Evanovich
July 15	A Thousand Splendid Suns	Khaled Hosseini
July 22	The Quickie	James Patterson and Michael Ledwidge
July 29	The Quickie	James Patterson and Michael Ledwidge
August 5	A Thousand Splendid Suns	Khaled Hosseini
August 12	A Thousand Splendid Suns	Khaled Hosseini
August 19	A Thousand Splendid Suns	Khaled Hosseini
August 26	A Thousand Splendid Suns	Khaled Hosseini
September 2	A Thousand Splendid Suns	Khaled Hosseini
September 9	A Thousand Splendid Suns	Khaled Hosseini
September 16	A Thousand Splendid Suns	Khaled Hosseini
September 23	A Thousand Splendid Suns	Khaled Hosseini
September 30	You've Been Warned	James Patterson and Howard Roughan
October 7	You've Been Warned	James Patterson and Howard Roughan
October 14	Playing for Pizza	John Grisham
October 21	Playing for Pizza	John Grisham
October 28	World Without End	Ken Follett
November 4	Playing for Pizza	John Grisham
November 11	Book of the Dead	Patricia Cornwell
November 18	Protect and Defended	Vince Flynn
November 25	Stone Cold	David Baldacci
December 2	Double Cross	James Patterson
December 9	Double Cross	James Patterson
December 16	Double Cross	James Patterson
December 23	"T" Is for Trespass	Sue Grafton
December 30	"T" Is for Trespass	Sue Grafton

== Nonfiction ==
The following list ranks the number-one best selling nonfiction books, in the hardcover nonfiction category.

Date	Book	Author
January 7	The Audacity of Hope	Barack Obama
January 14	The Audacity of Hope	Barack Obama
January 21	The Audacity of Hope	Barack Obama
January 28	The Audacity of Hope	Barack Obama
February 4	The Audacity of Hope	Barack Obama
February 11	The Audacity of Hope	Barack Obama
February 18	The Audacity of Hope	Barack Obama
February 25	The Audacity of Hope	Barack Obama
March 4	The Audacity of Hope	Barack Obama
March 11	The Audacity of Hope	Barack Obama
March 18	In an Instant	Lee and Bob Woodruff
March 25	In an Instant	Lee and Bob Woodruff
April 1	In an Instant	Lee and Bob Woodruff
April 8	In an Instant	Lee and Bob Woodruff
April 15	A Long Way Gone	Ishmael Beah
April 22	A Long Way Gone	Ishmael Beah
April 29	Einstein	Walter Isaacson
May 6	Einstein	Walter Isaacson
May 13	Einstein	Walter Isaacson
May 20	At the Center of the Storm	George Tenet
May 27	Einstein	Walter Isaacson
June 3	God Is Not Great	Christopher Hitchens
June 10	The Assault on Reason	Al Gore
June 17	The Assault on Reason	Al Gore
June 24	The Reagan Diaries	Ronald Reagan
July 1	The Reagan Diaries	Ronald Reagan
July 8	The Diana Chronicles	Tina Brown
July 15	The Diana Chronicles	Tina Brown
July 22	Lone Survivor	Marcus Luttrell with Patrick Robinson
July 29	Lone Survivor	Marcus Luttrell with Patrick Robinson
August 5	Quiet Strength	Tony Dungy with Nathan Whitaker
August 12	Lone Survivor	Marcus Luttrell with Patrick Robinson
August 19	It's All About Him	Denise Jackson with Ellen Vaughn
August 26	You Can Run But You Can't Hide	Duane Chapman with Laura Morton
September 2	You Can Run But You Can't Hide	Duane Chapman with Laura Morton
September 9	Quiet Strength	Tony Dungy with Nathan Whitaker
September 16	Wonderful Tonight	Pattie Boyd with Penny Junor
September 23	Giving: How Each of Us Can Change the World	Bill Clinton
September 30	Power to the People	Laura Ingraham
October 7	The Age of Turbulence	Alan Greenspan
October 14	The Age of Turbulence	Alan Greenspan
October 21	My Grandfather's Son	Clarence Thomas
October 28	I Am America (And So Can You!)	Stephen Colbert
November 4	I Am America (And So Can You!)	Stephen Colbert
November 11	I Am America (And So Can You!)	Stephen Colbert
November 18	I Am America (And So Can You!)	Stephen Colbert
November 25	I Am America (And So Can You!)	Stephen Colbert
December 2	I Am America (And So Can You!)	Stephen Colbert
December 9	An Inconvenient Book	Glenn Beck and Kevin Balfe
December 16	I Am America (And So Can You!)	Stephen Colbert
December 23	I Am America (And So Can You!)	Stephen Colbert
December 30	I Am America (And So Can You!)	Stephen Colbert

== See also ==
- Publishers Weekly list of bestselling novels in the United States in the 2000s
