= Stephen Colbert (character) =

Fictionalized persona of political satirist

- The Daily Show / The Colbert Report / The Late Show character
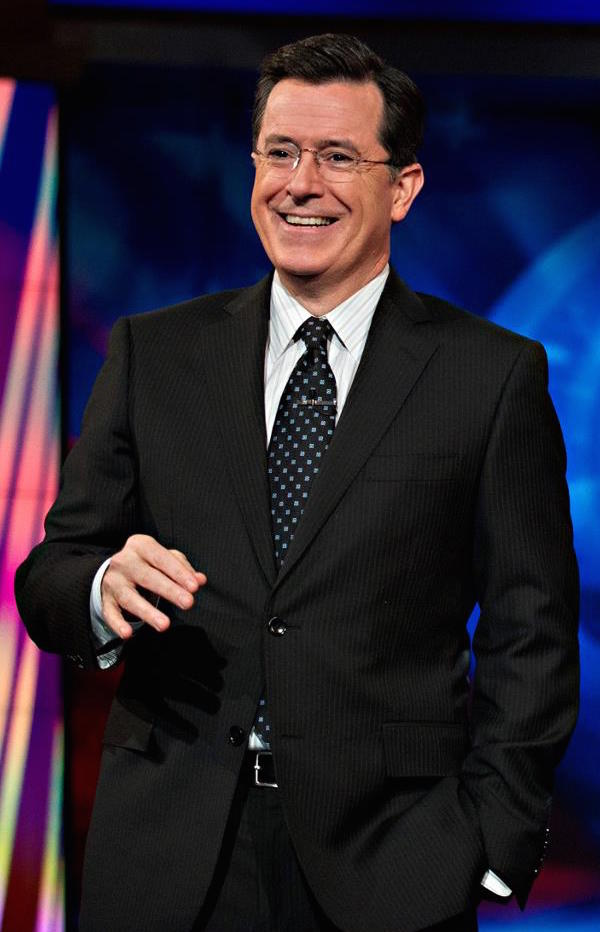
- Stephen Colbert in character
- First appearance: June 26, 1997 on The Daily Show
- Created by: Stephen Colbert
- Portrayed by: Stephen Colbert

In-universe information
- Gender: Male
- Title: Doctor of Fine Arts (honorary)
- Occupation: Former correspondent on The Daily Show; Former host of The Colbert Report
- Spouse: Lorraine
- Relatives: Stephen Colbert (identical twin cousin)
- Religion: Catholic Church
- Nationality: American

The Reverend Sir Dr. Stephen T. Mos Def Colbert D.F.A., Heavyweight Champion of the World (Note: As credited on January 21, 2013; see also § Titles and styling.) is the fictionalized persona of political satirist Stephen Colbert, as portrayed on the Comedy Central series The Daily Show and The Colbert Report, and occasionally on The Late Show with Stephen Colbert on CBS. Described as a "well-intentioned, poorly informed high-status idiot" and a "self-important right-wing commentator", he incorporates aspects of the real Colbert's life and interests but is primarily a parody of cable news pundits, particularly former Fox News prime time host Bill O'Reilly.

The character first appeared as a correspondent on Comedy Central's news parody series The Daily Show in 1997 and remained a regular contributor until 2005, when he left to host The Colbert Report, a spin-off show satirizing personality-driven political pundit programs. He has also been featured in a number of other public performances, most notably at the 2006 White House Correspondents' Association Dinner, and as the author of the books I Am America (And So Can You!), I Am a Pole (And So Can You!), and America Again: Re-becoming the Greatness We Never Weren't.

Colbert's performance attracted widespread critical attention and acclaim, with a reviewer writing for Time magazine calling it "one of the greatest sustained performances in pop culture, TV or otherwise", while a Vulture reporter called him "one of TV's greatest characters."

On April 23, 2014, the character appeared on The Daily Show to announce that he had clearly "won television" and would be ending The Colbert Report because he had met his goal. This came after the real Colbert announced that he would not be using the character when he replaced David Letterman as the host of The Late Show on CBS in 2015. The final episode of The Colbert Report aired on December 18, 2014.

The character has made a few media appearances following the conclusion of The Colbert Report. He made a cameo appearance in the House of Cards season three episode "Chapter 27", which was released on February 27, 2015. He returned for the August 6, 2015, episode of The Daily Show to honor Jon Stewart on the final episode of Stewart's original tenure on the series, and has since made multiple appearances on The Late Show.

== Development and inspirations ==
=== The Dana Carvey Show ===
Colbert's earliest mainstream exposure came in the 1996 prime time sketch comedy program The Dana Carvey Show. While only lasting seven episodes, it provided Colbert with roles that would help forge his future onscreen persona. This was largely due to its format of delivering sketch performances directly to the camera. Although they did not air, several sketches inspired by The Onion also had Colbert playing a deadpan anchor delivering the news. In an interview with The New York Times regarding The Dana Carvey Show, Colbert noted, "If you have an opportunity to give it right to the audience, there's a special connection that you make by looking at the camera."

Upon the show's cancellation, Colbert was cast for The Daily Show by co-creator Madeleine Smithberg. This was thanks to his performance as a nauseated waiter on The Dana Carvey Show.

=== The Daily Show ===
Colbert appeared as a correspondent on The Daily Show between 1997 and 2005. During this time, the comedian developed the character that would later form the basis for his Colbert Report persona, one that its creator calls a "fool who has spent a lot of his life playing not the fool". Colbert frequently cites Stone Phillips — whom he describes as having "the greatest neck in journalism" — as a source of inspiration for the character, as well as Geraldo Rivera, "because he's got this great sense of mission... He just thinks he's gonna change the world with this report". As a correspondent, Colbert was regularly pitted against knowledgeable interview subjects, fellow correspondent Steve Carell, or host Jon Stewart in scripted exchanges which typically revealed the character's lack of knowledge of whatever subject he was discussing. Other Daily Show correspondents have since adopted a similar style; former correspondent Rob Corddry recalls that when he and Ed Helms first joined the show's cast in 2002, they "just imitated Stephen Colbert for a year or two".

=== The Colbert Report ===
In 2005, Colbert left The Daily Show to host a spin-off series entitled The Colbert Report, a parody of personality-driven political pundit programs such as Fox News's The O'Reilly Factor that center largely on the personal views of their hosts. Because of this enlarged role, the personality and beliefs of the Stephen Colbert character have become more clearly defined over the course of the show, complete with a fictitious backstory that has been revealed piecemeal in short monologues accompanying a part of the program.

The character Colbert portrays in Report originated as an amplification of his self-important Daily Show correspondent. As they developed the character and the show Colbert and his staff began to look at some more specific models. Bill O'Reilly, whom the character affectionately nicknames "Papa Bear", is the most commonly cited point of reference. In a 2006 episode of The Colbert Report, Colbert remarked that, "if it wasn't for [O'Reilly], this show wouldn't exist". In adapting the character for the Report, Colbert has also mentioned Aaron Brown, Anderson Cooper, Sean Hannity, Lou Dobbs and Joe Scarborough as having an influence over his performance. References to the character's abuse of prescription drugs are believed to be an allusion to Rush Limbaugh's addiction to painkillers.

The nightly in-character guest interviews were initially of concern to Colbert, who worried his character's belligerent nature would be off-putting to guests. However, he says that after the show's debut, he found he was able to "slide the intensity" of his behavior depending on his interviewee's ability to respond to his aggressive approach. Colbert came to cite the interview segment as his favorite part of the show, because it allowed him to improvise. Colbert advised his guests to disabuse the character of his ignorance. "Don't let me get away with anything. Don't try to play my game. Be real. Be passionate. Hold your ideas. Give me resistance. Give me traction I can work against."

=== Books and other media ===
Colbert is the central character in the 2007 book I Am America (And So Can You!). Co-written with Paul Dinello and the writers of The Colbert Report, I Am America delves into what the character considers to be the most pressing issues facing America. The book takes influence from the literary endeavors of the character's pundit models, such as O'Reilly's The O'Reilly Factor (2000) and Hannity's Deliver Us From Evil (2004), which Colbert says he "forced" himself to read as a reference. I Am America is considered a pure extension of the Report; the written medium allowed the writers to employ different styles, such as long-format arguments, that they could not have used on television. "You can actually spend 20 pages talking about religion whereas in the show, two pages is about as long as we hold any one idea", Colbert explains. In doing this, the writers "discovered things that [the character] cared about that... they didn't know he cared about before".

A character similar to Colbert's Daily Show persona featured in the 2003 book Wigfield: The Can Do Town That Just May Not by Colbert, Dinello and Amy Sedaris. Russell Hokes, a self-aggrandizing journalist, was voiced by Colbert in both stage performances of the text and the audiobook. Colbert likens Hokes to his self-important correspondent character, but "more extreme, more self-involved". Colbert has also drawn a link between his character and Jerri Blank, the protagonist of Comedy Central's Strangers with Candy (1999–2000), a show he created with Dinello and Sedaris: "There's a lot of Jerri in The Colbert Report. He was well-intentioned, just incredibly poorly informed and guided".

== Non-fictional elements ==
Certain elements of the character are drawn from the real Colbert's personal life. Both the real Colbert and the character were raised in Charleston, South Carolina; both are the youngest of 11 children; both played Dungeons & Dragons as teenagers; and both are practicing Catholics. Colbert's own interest in and knowledge of religion, science fiction, and J. R. R. Tolkien's The Lord of the Rings story will often show through in the Report. His character has a chocolate portrait of Viggo Mortensen (who portrayed Aragorn in Peter Jackson's The Lord of the Rings films) in a place of honor on his shelf; Mortensen briefly reprised the role of Aragorn in the Report's September 13, 2007 episode. He also owns a Sting sword presented to him by Peter Jackson.

Colbert occasionally mentioned his real-life siblings on the show. In one episode, he placed his brother Ed, a lawyer who advises the International Olympic Committee, "on notice" for refusing to grant the show the rights to air footage of a dispute between two American speed skaters. Ed later appeared at the start of the February 22, 2010 edition advising Stephen on how to cover the Vancouver Winter Olympics since his character does not have the television rights to the games. (Footage from the Richmond Olympic Oval was used after Stephen was named a special advisor to the U.S. Speedskating Federation. Generally, journalists covering the Olympics do not have access to the venues unless their employer has the rights to Olympic TV coverage.) When his sister Elizabeth Colbert Busch declared her intention to run for Congress, he mentioned the event. Later, when she was nominated to run against Mark Sanford and the MSNBC show Morning Joe declared their support for Sanford and mentioned Colbert, he defended his sister's campaign.

In an appearance at Harvard University in 2006, Colbert revealed that his character's fear of bears was in part inspired by a recurring dream he has had, in which a bear is standing between him and his goal. The character's phobia, which was initially referenced in the show's first "ThreatDown" skit, was originally slated to be a fear of alligators. By the time the Report went to air, the alligator story was several weeks old, and the writers chose to use a more recent news item involving a bear in its place.

After Colbert received an honorary Doctor of Fine Arts from Knox College, the show began listing his name in the ending credits as "Dr. Stephen T. Colbert, D.F.A." even though using both the honorific prefix and post-nominal letters is incorrect. During the show, the character will sometimes refer to the degree and the qualifications he mistakenly believes it bestows upon him.

In May 2007, Colbert was voted the "second most influential person in the world" in a Time magazine online poll. The first spot was taken by Rain, a young K-pop star with a large following in Asia and the United States. Colbert then declared Rain his "arch-nemesis" and began mentioning him frequently on the Report. Colbert filmed a satirical music video poking fun at Rain's popular single "How to Avoid the Sun" and referencing several stereotypical South Korean dishes and products. The one-sided feud eventually culminated in Colbert challenging Rain to a competition on air. After telling Colbert "not to quit his day job", Rain appeared in a short segment on the show where he competed in (and won) a Dance Dance Revolution dance-off with Colbert. Both have been defeated by Shigeru Miyamoto in recent polls, though they still continue to be strong contenders.

On June 21, 2007, Colbert broke his left wrist on the set of the Report while performing his warm-up for the show. This quickly became a regular source of comedy on the show as the self-absorbed character requested his audience send flowers, launched a campaign against Hollywood's supposed glorification of "wrist violence", and began a "wrist awareness" campaign with "WristStrong" silicone bracelets. On August 23, 2007, the cast was removed on air and was put up for auction to the general public, complete with celebrity signatures, on eBay, where it achieved a winning bid of $17,200. All of the proceeds from both the cast and the bracelets were donated to the Yellow Ribbon Fund.

In an interview with The Buffalo News, Colbert said "The weird thing about my character, even on the show, is sometimes I say what I mean. It doesn't matter to me that the audience doesn't know when that is."

On June 19, 2013, Colbert returned from an unplanned break of several days following the death of his 92-year-old mother, Lorna Colbert. The emotional Colbert started the show with a tribute to his mother, in which he presented a brief biography of her life in photos, accompanied by his eulogy of her.

== Titles and styling ==
Over time, the character has accumulated multiple titles and styles of address, which can be summarized as "Her Excellency the Rev. Sir Doctor Stephen Tyrone (Note: The character has also claimed his middle name is "Tiberius", a reference to James Tiberius Kirk.) Mos Def Colbert, DFA, Heavyweight Champion of the World* featuring Flo Rida, La Première Dame De France".

He was granted an honorary doctorate of fine arts by Knox College in 2006, giving him the title of Doctor and use of the suffix DFA. (Note: Use of both at the same time is both inappropriate and fittingly in character.) This title was featured regularly during the recurring segment "Cheating Death with Dr. Stephen T. Colbert, DFA". On April 7, 2009, Colbert asked to be knighted by Queen Noor of Jordan, who bestowed him with the title of Sir. Colbert became an ordained minister on June 2, 2011, granting himself the title of Reverend.

Yasiin Bey gave Colbert permission to use his stage name Mos Def on October 5, 2011.

After Mike Tyson failed to appear for a scheduled interview with Colbert on July 23, 2013, Colbert declared himself Heavyweight Champion of the World by default, and granted himself use of the title. The asterisk denotes that he did not defeat Tyson in an actual boxing match.

During the segment "I Tried to Sign Up for Obamacare" on October 23, 2013, his name on the ACA form included featuring Flo Rida.

Her Excellency was added to the title after Colbert was seated next to Michelle Obama at a White House state dinner in February 2014, in which the then-President of France François Hollande was not accompanied by a partner. Because it is customary that the first lady of a visiting nation is seated next to the First Lady of the United States, Colbert proclaimed himself First Lady of France on February 12, 2014.

== Fictional biography ==
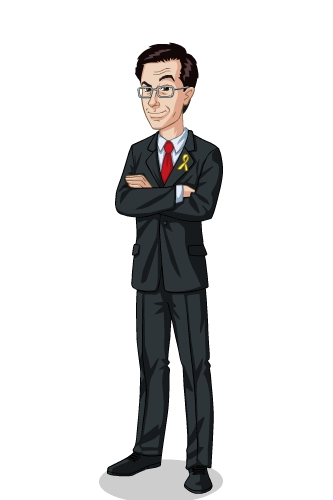
Colbert avatar

Colbert's fictional history is not always rigidly adhered to by the show's writers. The comedian himself says that "My character's history may not always be perfectly consistent ... There's my bio and there's my character's bio, and then there's my character's history, which is slightly different than my character's bio." His early life, prior to becoming host of The Colbert Report, is expanded upon in I Am America (And So Can You!).

Like the actor who portrays him, Stephen T. Colbert is the youngest of 11 children, born into a devout Catholic family—the character's family was so devout, in fact, they sent their teenage son to an "exorcism day camp located in Canton, Ohio", after they discovered he liked Dungeons & Dragons. In his in-character appearance on The O'Reilly Factor, Colbert stated that he is of Irish descent and only adopted the French pronunciation of his surname to "get the cultural elites" on his side. Colbert has made conflicting statements regarding his middle name, which he has at different times stated to be "Tyrone" (Colbert's actual middle name), "Tiberius" (like that of Captain James T. Kirk), "Lee-Harvey", and "Qxyzzy".

The character has said he was regularly beaten up in high school, and by the time he left for college he was determined never to be a victim again. As such, on the first day of his freshman year he walked into class and punched the first person he saw (unfortunately, this happened to be his ethics professor). He attended Dartmouth College (instead of his first pick, Hogwarts, claiming that his white owl led them to reject him), and was a member of the ΣΑΕ fraternity, although his acceptance into the college appears to have been largely influenced by a claimed familial relationship with a wealthy donor, and graduated in the top 47 percent of his class with a major in history. He has also referred to Bob Jones University as an alma mater.

Prior to embarking on a career in journalism, Colbert worked as a carnival roustabout and a construction worker. During the 1980s, he was the lead singer and guitarist of an ABC-like new wave band called "Stephen and the Colberts". The comedian portrays his character's younger self in the band's music video, wearing worn jeans, cowboy boots and a spiky hair style. Their only revealed song to date is entitled "Charlene (I'm Right Behind You)", one of numerous references to an ex-girlfriend (and cousin) whom he continues to stalk despite numerous restraining orders. This song has been made available for download for free in the video game Rock Band. On the May 14, 2008, episode, Colbert claimed to have been the "totalitarian ruler of Malawi from 1982 to 1984". He mentions that his wife's first name is Lorraine.

Colbert later moved into reporting, working in TV news for several stations in Virginia and North Carolina. He has shown footage of himself as a "young man" (portrayed by Colbert, wearing a false moustache) working as an anchor at a local news station (WPTS) in Patterson Springs, North Carolina, still displaying his trademark outrage over minor municipal issues in the manner of 20/20 correspondent John Stossel. In 1997, Colbert was promoted to anchor of the Channel 7 News on WPTS Patterson Springs after outing the previous anchor, Wayne Colt, for his cocaine addiction. His ensuing investigative reports into Colt's downfall earned him a local Emmy, and eventually a correspondent position at The Daily Show. This corresponds with the year the comedian joined the cast of the show.

Colbert often makes digs at the expense of Daily Show host Jon Stewart. He has implied a strained relationship with Stewart, in contrast with the real Colbert's admiration for the comedian, and suggests that his departure from The Daily Show occurred under dubious circumstances. The character has described Stewart as a sexual predator, and has been known to become tearful when his name is brought up. On the other hand, Colbert has also implied that he only got his own show by blackmailing Stewart with incriminating photographs.

Colbert is described in America (The Book): A Citizen's Guide to Democracy Inaction, to which he was a contributor, as holding the positions of the Arthur M. Schlesinger Professor of American Studies at Harvard University, and of Chief Defender of International War Crimes at the World Court in the Hague. The book also states that he is a seven-time recipient of the Werner Heisenberg Prize for Excellence in Theoretical Mathematics. Paradoxically, Colbert is described as being "barely capable of feeding himself" as well as being "personally unpleasant".

=== Retirement from television ===
On April 10, 2014, it was announced that the real-life Colbert would be replacing David Letterman as the host of CBS's The Late Show in 2015. It was also announced that The Colbert Report would be ending and Colbert would not be using the character on the CBS show. Following the announcement, the character made a special surprise appearance on the April 23, 2014, episode of The Daily Show to report that it has become clear to him that he has "won television" and changed the world, the goal he originally set out to do, and thus no longer feels the need to continue. He expressed interest in taking over The Late Show after Letterman retired but could not because "they already gave it to some fat guy".

During the final episode, Colbert accidentally kills "lifelong friend and colleague" Grimmy in the final segment of "Cheating Death," after which he becomes immortal and uses his powers to fuel a star-studded celebrity singalong of "We'll Meet Again," before boarding a sleigh driven by Santa Claus, Abraham Lincoln, and "the man with all the answers." At the end of the show, Colbert tosses back to Stewart at The Daily Show, implying that the show's existence was just an extended correspondent report for the program.

On the July 18, 2016, episode of The Late Show with Stephen Colbert, Colbert is revealed to have been living with a now-retired Stewart in a remote cabin in a forest. In the skit, the real Colbert visited Stewart, asking him to explain how Donald Trump became the 2016 Republican nominee for president. Perplexed, Stewart turned to Colbert the character, who briefly returned to television to deliver an edition of "The Wørd" explaining Trump's appeal, before turning the show back to "that other guy", the real Colbert.

On the July 27 episode, the real Colbert claimed that CBS's then-sister company Viacom had informed CBS that the character Stephen Colbert was their intellectual property and could not appear on The Late Show. He then introduced Stephen Colbert's "identical twin cousin" (a possible allusion to The Patty Duke Show), Stephen Colbert, as a new member of The Late Show team. Colbert stated the difference between him and the other Colbert is they have birthmarks of the opposite Olsen twins. He returned for a "W~~E~~RD" segment on The Late Show on January 19 to beg Obama to stay in office.

A segment of "The Wørd" appeared on The Late Show again in January 2023.

== Presidential campaigns ==
=== Colbert '08 ===
Colbert dropped hints of a potential presidential run throughout 2007, with speculation intensifying following the release of his book, I Am America (And So Can You!), which was rumored (invariably by Colbert himself) to be a sign that he was indeed testing the waters for a future bid for the White House. Colbert staunchly refused to confirm or deny his candidacy, stating he had not yet made up his mind and must first talk the possibility over with his family.

Colbert confirmed his presidential ambitions on his October 16, 2007, show, stating his intention to run both on the Republican and Democratic platforms, but only as a favorite son in his native South Carolina. In an interview with Larry King he revealed that, as his running mate, he would consider Mike Huckabee (who himself jokingly offered Colbert the vice-presidential position). He also speculated on the possibility of a Colbert-Putin or Colbert-Colbert ticket. Colbert abandoned plans to run as a Republican due to the $35,000 fee required to file for the South Carolina primary. On November 1, 2007, it was announced that he would not appear on the Democratic primary ballot either, after being deemed ineligible by the South Carolina Democratic Party executive committee. Several days later he announced that he was withdrawing from the race, saying that he did not wish to put the country through an agonizing Supreme Court battle.

The show went on hiatus immediately after this as a result of the Writers Guild of America Strike. When it returned to air on January 7, 2008, without a writing staff, the character justified his absence by stating that he had taken some time off to have "a good cry" about his failed presidential attempt. He said that he had returned to air in celebration of Huckabee's success in the Iowa Caucus, something for which he considers himself personally responsible as Huckabee has appeared on the Report on numerous occasions to invite Colbert to be his running mate.

Despite having withdrawn from the presidential race, Colbert continued to be referred to as an active candidate in the Marvel Universe. Colbert '08 paraphernalia appeared in the artwork of various Marvel comics, and Colbert himself teamed up with Spider-Man in the October 2008 comic Amazing Spider-Man #573. On November 5, 2008, Marvel announced that its fictional newspaper The Daily Bugle was reporting Colbert's victory over both John McCain and Barack Obama. Several hours later Marvel released a second Daily Bugle article correcting its initial reports, stating that while Colbert had won the popular vote Obama had secured more electoral votes, thus winning the presidency. "Oops, our bad", said Marvel's then editor-in-chief Joe Quesada of the confusion. "We completely forgot the Marvel Universe reflects what happens in the real world."

=== 2012 exploration for "President of the United States of South Carolina" ===
During the September 28, 2011, episode of The Colbert Report, Colbert, with the help of his lawyer, set up his own 501(c)(4) organization, similar to American Crossroads. As a super PAC the organization can raise unlimited sums of money from corporations, unions and other groups, as well as wealthy individuals. With Colbert as president of the Colbert Super PAC, the PAC ran several political ads prior to the Ames Straw Poll. The first ad, titled "Episode IV: A New Hope", told Iowans to write-in "Rick Parry" instead of Rick Perry, and the second ad, "Behind the Green Corn", supported "Parry" as well.

During the January 12, 2012, episode of The Colbert Report, Colbert announced his plans to form an exploratory committee to lay the groundwork for his possible candidacy for "President of the United States of South Carolina". In the process, he transferred control of the Super PAC to Jon Stewart, renaming it The Definitely Not Coordinating With Stephen Colbert Super PAC, since, according to Colbert's lawyer, Trevor Potter, it would definitely be illegal for Colbert and Stewart to coordinate their efforts in super PAC activities. A CBS news report called Colbert's run "essentially a joke", saying, "The real significance of Colbert's announcement may be the spotlight it puts on super PACs, into which donors can pour unlimited money in order to support or attack candidates, and thus influence election outcomes. Super PACs were made possible by the 2010 "Citizens United" Supreme Court decision that effectively classified money as speech".

Colbert's timing was too late for his name to be added the South Carolina primary ballot, and South Carolina law would not allow for write-in candidates. Polling showed that 21% of the potential Republican primary electorate reported they would be "more likely" to vote for former candidate Herman Cain, who remained on the ballot, if that vote served as encouragement for Colbert. Herman Cain received 6,338 votes in the South Carolina Republican primary, which was more than all the other withdrawn candidates received combined. On the next episode of The Colbert Report broadcast on January 23, 2012, Colbert boasted about passing the 1% threshold and for Cain receiving many more votes in South Carolina than in Iowa and New Hampshire. Colbert then announced that he would no longer be exploring a run for President of the United States of South Carolina.

== Characteristics ==
Described as a "caustic right-wing bully", an "arch-conservative blowhard", and by his creator and namesake as a "well-intentioned, poorly informed, high status idiot", Colbert is egomaniacal, xenophobic and fiercely anti-intellectual. He claims to be politically independent, like his idol Bill "Papa Bear" O'Reilly; although in fact the character fawns over the Bush administration and the Republican Party, and frequently asks his guests, "George Bush: Great president, or the greatest president?" Following the election of Barack Obama in 2008, Colbert continued his right-wing views, but stated he would "support our new President as long as [he] remains popular". The real Colbert emphasizes that his character is genuinely well-meaning and wants to do the right thing but does not have the tools to achieve it "because he has no curiosity, he doesn't like to read and he won't listen to anybody except the voices in his head".

Colbert is deeply self-centered and takes everything personally, a trait which is reflected in his discussion of the news and current events. According to the comedian, "There's nothing too large that doesn't involve him. Every news story is really about him ... Everything he cares about is a news story because he cares about it." This is expressed in his frequent attacks on and feuds with well-known figures such as The Decemberists, Sean Penn, Conan O'Brien, Rain, Barry Manilow, Tony Bennett, and Don Rickles (the latter three of whom beat out Colbert for Best Individual in a Variety or Music Program at the Emmys). The comedian equates these feuds with Bill O'Reilly's culture wars.

Central to Colbert's personality is his rigid belief that "what I say is right, and [nothing] anyone else says could possibly be true", regardless of any evidence to the contrary. He discussed this in the Report's first Wørd segment, using the term "truthiness" as he explained what he perceives to be the difference between "those who think with their head and those who know with their heart". He has further gone on to ascribe "truthiness" to other institutions, including Wikipedia, which he believes upholds his view that reality can be determined by consensus opinion, and often encourages viewers to use Wikipedia to "change reality". Colbert believes that if a majority of people want something to be true, that thing therefore must become the truth. For instance, after months of scoffing at global warming, Colbert suddenly reversed his position, conceding its existence only due to the box office success of An Inconvenient Truth, a sign that "the free market has spoken".

Colbert describes himself as racially color-blind, to the point of being unable to visually identify a person's race, explaining, "Now, I don't see race ... People tell me I'm white, and I believe them, because I own a lot of Jimmy Buffett albums." His race-blindness is a recurring joke, and this statement is often repeated on the show with different punch lines. For this same reason he believed that he was black when he had an emotional breakdown after watching Obama's inauguration video. He later qualified these statements in his book, stating, "When I say I don't see race, I mean I don't see black people. But I can spot a Mexican at a hundred paces." Despite all these claims, Colbert often boasts that he has a large number of token minority friends (including Jon Stewart as "[his] Jewish friend" and Oprah Winfrey as "[his] black friend"), although in the photos shown these friends appear decidedly uninterested in him. He has stated a similar inability to distinguish between the sexes, claiming to only "see an American". This comes in contradiction of his own sexist behavior, for instance, calling only on men during an open discussion with his audience on women's issues.

The comedian has said that he likes playing weak characters, and particularly revealing weaknesses in high status figures. During the course of the show, he will frequently peel back the Colbert character's apparent bravado to expose a very weak inner core. In one instance, Colbert demands one of his staff members subject him to simulated waterboarding, only to break down into pleas for mercy upon hearing a water bottle cap popped. In another episode, he criticizes The Today Show cohost Matt Lauer for saying that it's unacceptable for men to cry, only to sob hysterically upon learning that Katie Couric has left the show. These status shifts occur commonly, and constitute a central component of the show's comedy.

Colbert frequently uses his show as a platform for promoting his own fictional merchandise, including colognes, science fiction novels, medication, and his own sperm.

== 2009 visit to Baghdad, Iraq ==
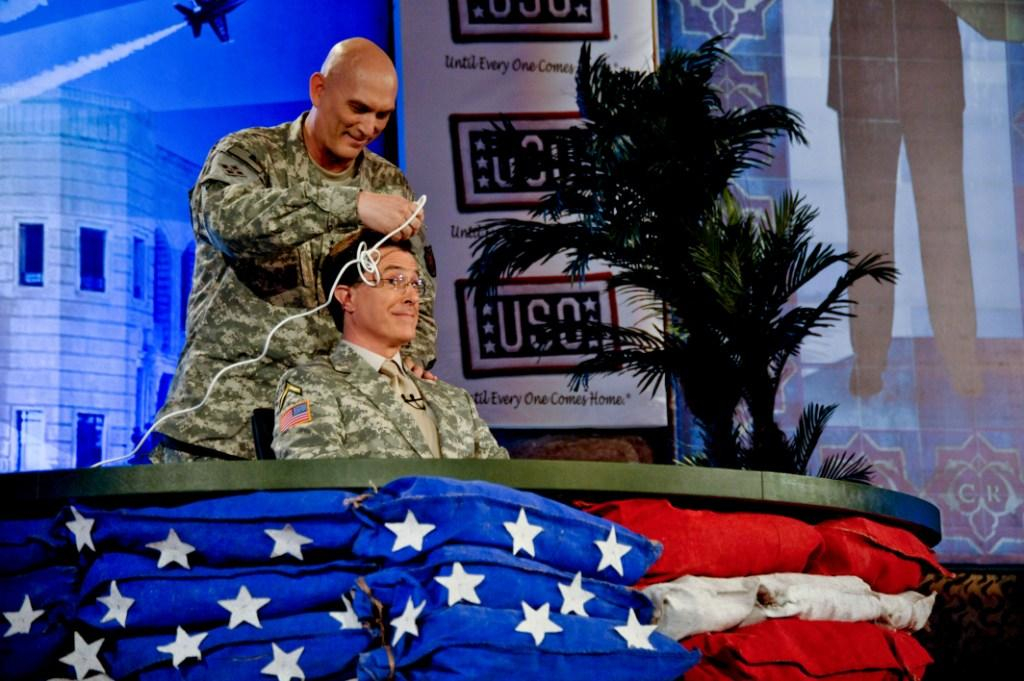
Colbert receives an "Army" haircut, from Four-Star General Ray Odierno, during filming.

Colbert arrived in Baghdad, Iraq on June 5, 2009, to film a week of shows called "Operation Iraqi Stephen: Going Commando". The episodes were filmed June 7–9, 2009, sponsored by the USO (United Service Organizations). Al-Faw Palace's rotunda was used for the filming of Operation Iraqi Stephen. Colbert had a suit tailored for him in the Army Combat Uniform pattern and went through an abbreviated version of the Army's basic training regimen. The suit was specially tailored by Brooks Brothers. As a tribute to Bob Hope, Colbert brought a golf club on stage, a Hope trademark.

The first episode included an interview with Coalition forces Commanding General Ray Odierno, which was interrupted by U.S. President Barack Obama. Obama stated that if Colbert really wanted to be a soldier, along with his attendance to Basic Combat Training, he needed to have his hair shaved off. Obama then ordered General Odierno to "shave that man's head". General Odierno then began to shave Colbert's head; the job was finished during the commercial break by one of Colbert's staff members. One Army major said that "shaving of the hair is an amazing show of support" that was "very touching". The episode also featured a message to the troops from U.S. Senator John McCain with a friendly reminder to "always remember to clean your muskets", a lesson he claimed to have learned at Valley Forge, as a reference to old age jokes that he faced during the 2008 Presidential Election. Several other prominent politicians, including former presidents Bill Clinton, George H. W. Bush, and George W. Bush, along with Vice President Joe Biden and then Alaska governor Sarah Palin recorded messages for the troops that were aired in subsequent episodes.

== Other appearances ==
- White House Correspondents' Association Dinner April 29, 2006
- 58th Primetime Emmy Awards, presenter, August 27, 2006
- Night of Too Many Stars: An Overbooked Benefit for Autism, October 15, 2006
- Friendly Neighborhood Spider-Man #15, December 20, 2006
- The O'Reilly Factor, in-character interview, January 18, 2007
- 59th Primetime Emmy Awards, presenter, September 16, 2007
- Meet the Press, in-character interview as presidential candidate, October 21, 2007
- 60th Primetime Emmy Awards, presenter, September 21, 2008
- The Amazing Spider-Man #573, October 15, 2008
- Late Night with Conan O'Brien, February 4, 2008 and February 17, 2009
- United States House Judiciary Subcommittee on Immigration Policy and Enforcement, September 24, 2010. However, Colbert did break character when he responded to questions by Congresswoman Judy Chu about the plight of immigrant workers.
- Rally to Restore Sanity and/or Fear, Co-organizer October 30, 2010
- This Week with George Stephanopoulos, January 15, 2012
- A White House state dinner in honor of French president, Francois Hollande, February 11, 2014. Colbert was seated at the head table, in a seat which would have gone to Hollande's guest had he brought one. The following night, Colbert referenced on his show his seating assignment at the head table, calling himself the "First Lady of France".
- In 2014 the character was used in an ad campaign for Wonderful Pistachios, which launched with a Super Bowl commercial that aired during Super Bowl XLVIII
- The Tonight Show Starring Jimmy Fallon, February 17, 2014, the first episode. Fallon had several celebrities come on stage and give him $100 bills paying off bets that they lost because he got to host The Tonight Show. Colbert was the last celebrity and he came with $100 in a bucket of pennies, pouring them down Fallon's clothes.
- 2014 RSA Conference
- 2014 Comic-con: appeared both as a panel moderator as well as in costume portraying a character called "Prince Hawkcat" which is supposed to be "Half Hawk. Half Cat. Whole Prince". The attendance in costume was not revealed until two months after the event.
- October 2014 Apple Inc. press event: Colbert participated in the event via phone where he asked to be given the title "Supreme Allied Commander of Super Secrecy"
- Colbert appeared in the November 6, 2014 episode of @midnight to announce the "Hashtag Wars" for the episode.

=== After the conclusion of The Colbert Report ===
- Colbert made an appearance in the House of Cards season three episode "Chapter 27". The segment was taped before The Colbert Report set was transformed into the set for The Nightly Show with Larry Wilmore. It was first released on February 27, 2015, two months after the final episode of The Colbert Report aired.
- On August 6, 2015, Colbert (both in and out of character) returned for Jon Stewart's last night on The Daily Show. Colbert appeared along with many other correspondents who have served under Stewart's tenure in order to pay tribute to the departing host.
- On July 18, 2016, Colbert reprised the character on The Late Show with Stephen Colbert. The character appeared with Jon Stewart and Colbert (as himself, in his capacity as host), before the character hosted the Colbert Report segment, "The Wørd".
- On July 27, 2016, Colbert announced that the character could no longer appear on The Late Show, explaining that, immediately after the July 18 airing, lawyers at CBS were contacted by a lawyer "at another company" and told the character was the intellectual property of the unnamed company (presumably Viacom, Comedy Central's parent company). Instead, Colbert told the audience that he was welcoming via satellite "Stephen Colbert's identical twin cousin, Stephen Colbert", with the new character showing interest in returning to The Late Show regularly. Colbert then introduced a close facsimile of the Colbert Report's "The Wørd" segment, spelled instead as the "W~~E~~RD".
- On January 19, 2017, Colbert asked his Comedy Central character's "identical twin cousin", Stephen Colbert, to discuss Barack Obama's legacy. Despite his assertion that he was not the same character seen on The Colbert Report, this "Stephen Colbert", the identical twin cousin, was interviewed "live via satellite" from the cabin where the original character now lives with Jon Stewart, as shown in the July 18, 2016 episode when the original character reappeared for the first time since the conclusion of The Colbert Report. He also appeared to share many of the characteristics of the original character, such as the "C" lapel pin and Captain America shield, and wearing a suit. After legal issues with Comedy Central and Viacom over the ownership of the character, his "identical cousin" introduced on the July 27, 2016 episode wore an American flag shirt, not a suit. In addition to sharing the original character's signature bombastic commentary and using his catchphrase "Nation", Colbert also introduced his alter-ego's cousin as "conservative pundit, Stephen Colbert", suggesting he is in fact playing the original character.
- On March 20, 2017, the character broke into the monologue to chastise Colbert for his "misguided analysis of Trump's budget" and prevent him from "making an ass of yourself on network TV". The character mentioned his fear of bears from The Colbert Report, saying that "they are godless killing machines". The character, introduced as Colbert's "conservative pundit colleague", proceeded to do the "W~~E~~RD".
- On April 19, 2017, Colbert reprised the role of the character in The Late Show with Stephen Colbert to mourn Bill O'Reilly's departure from Fox News.
- On April 30, 2018, the character Stephen Colbert briefly reappeared to discuss comedian Michelle Wolf's controversial speech at the 2018 White House Correspondents' Dinner.
- On July 21, 2025, the character appeared momentarily as Stephen discussed the cancellation of The Late Show with Stephen Colbert to say "they made one mistake–they left me alive". (This was the first time that the character had appeared since the 2019 merger of CBS and Viacom to form what was known at the time of the segment as Paramount Global, resulting in CBS and Comedy Central returning to the same corporate structure.)
- On September 18, 2025, the character appeared in an episode of The Late Show, discussing the suspension of Jimmy Kimmel Live! due to comments made by Jimmy Kimmel regarding the assassination of Charlie Kirk. Colbert also revived "The Wørd" under its original title.

== See also ==
- Cultural impact of The Colbert Report
- Recurring segments on The Colbert Report
- List of The Colbert Report characters
- Tek Jansen
- Wally George
- Who Made Huckabee?
