= Lee Habeeb =

American radio producer

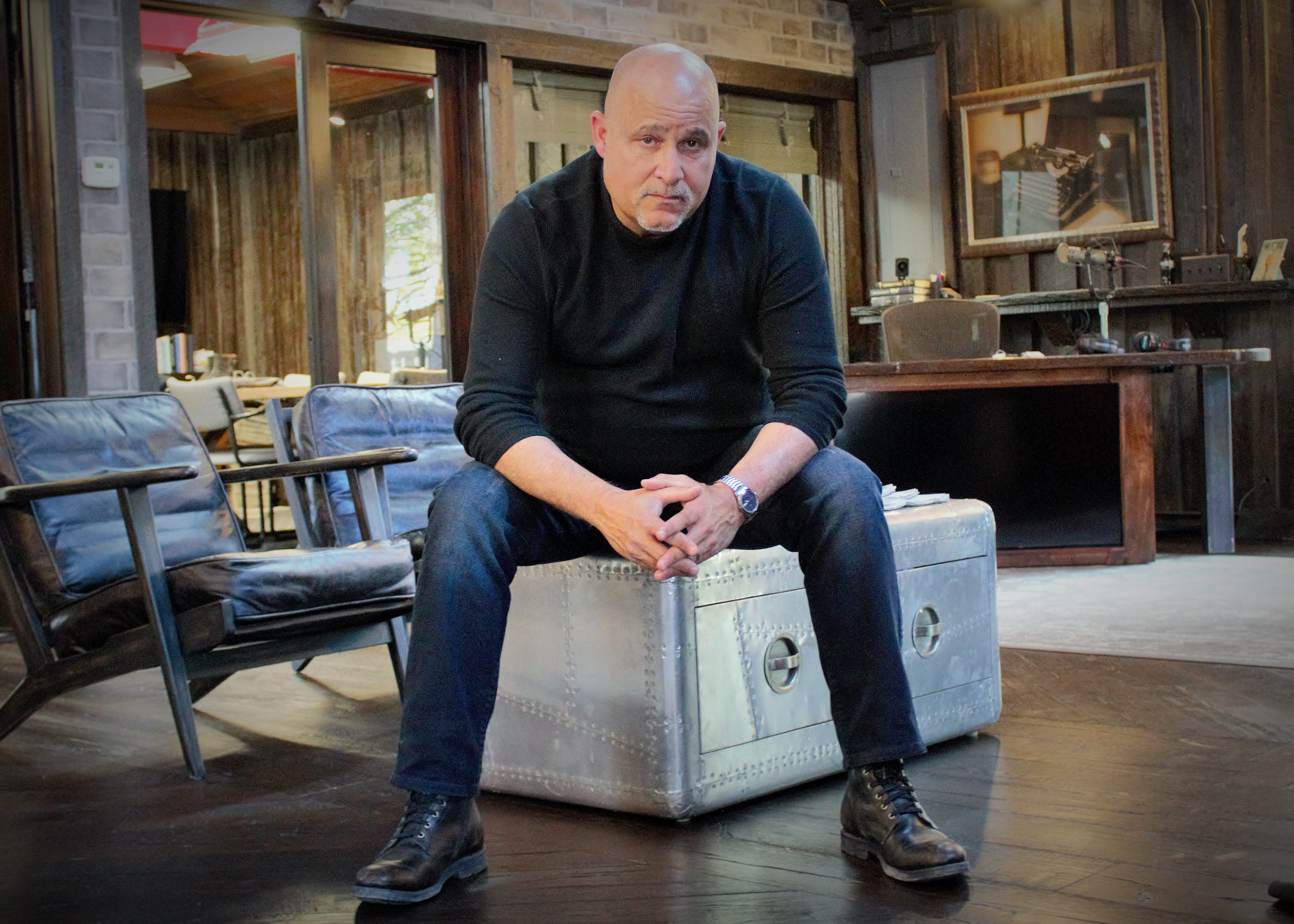
- in his Oxford, Mississippi studio
- Born: Lee Michael Habeeb; January 21, 1961 (age 65); Teaneck, New Jersey, U.S.
- Education: University of Virginia School of Law (JD)
- Occupations: radio personality, radio producer, essayist
- Spouse: Valerie Habeeb
- Children: 1
- Website: www.ouramericanstories.com

Lee Habeeb is an American talk radio executive, host, podcaster and essayist. He is the creator and co-founder of The Laura Ingraham Show; the Vice President of Content for the Salem Media Group; the founder of American Private Radio; and the creator, founder and host of Our American Stories, a weekday radio show and podcast heard across the U.S. and syndicated by iHeart Media Group's Premiere Networks.

Habeeb has written columns for USA Today, The Washington Examiner, the National Review, and LifeZette. He currently writes a weekly essay for Newsweek.

== Life ==
Habeeb was born January 21, 1961 in Teaneck, New Jersey to Christina (née Lapadula) and John Habeeb. He is of Lebanese, Italian, and German descent, a mix that has influenced his views on American culture and the immigrant experience. "My grandparents didn't come here to change America," Habeeb wrote in Newsweek. "They came to have America change them—and their families."

Habeeb graduated from the University of Virginia School of Law with a J.D. in 1991 but never practiced law, having spent time after college exploring writing, acting and other pursuits.

== Our American Stories ==
Habeeb is the host and founder of Our American Stories, a storytelling radio show and podcast featuring stories that highlight American life including, history, sports, music, free enterprise, charity, faith, family and more. The show studiously stays away from politics, opinion or the news of the day. "It's the most refreshing, classiest and best produced spoken word podcast and radio show to come down the pike in years," Michael Harrison said in Talkers.com. "And one of the fastest growing shows, too."

On August 2, 2021, Our American Stories was signed to a syndication deal with Premiere Networks, a subsidiary of iHeartMedia. In November 2025 Premiere Networks announced several new affiliate stations for Our American Stories, including: WOR in New York; KNEW in San Francisco; WTAM in Cleveland; and WOND in Atlantic City. The show is carried on 480 stations across the country.

The show was ranked #98 in Talkers Heavy Hundred in 2018, #28 in 2020 and in 2025, made its way to the Top 10 - at #10.

As part of the White House “Story of America” series (released in August 2025), Habeeb tells the story of John Adams and his defense of the Redcoats in the Boston Massacre trial. The series was created in partnership with Hillsdale College and the U.S. Department of Education.

== Personal life ==
Habeeb graduated from the University of Virginia School of Law (Class of 1991).

He lived in Washington, DC from 2001-2007, in Oxford, MS from 2007-2025. Since 2026, he has lived in Ft. Worth, TX. with his wife and daughter.
