= America's Election Headquarters =

US television program

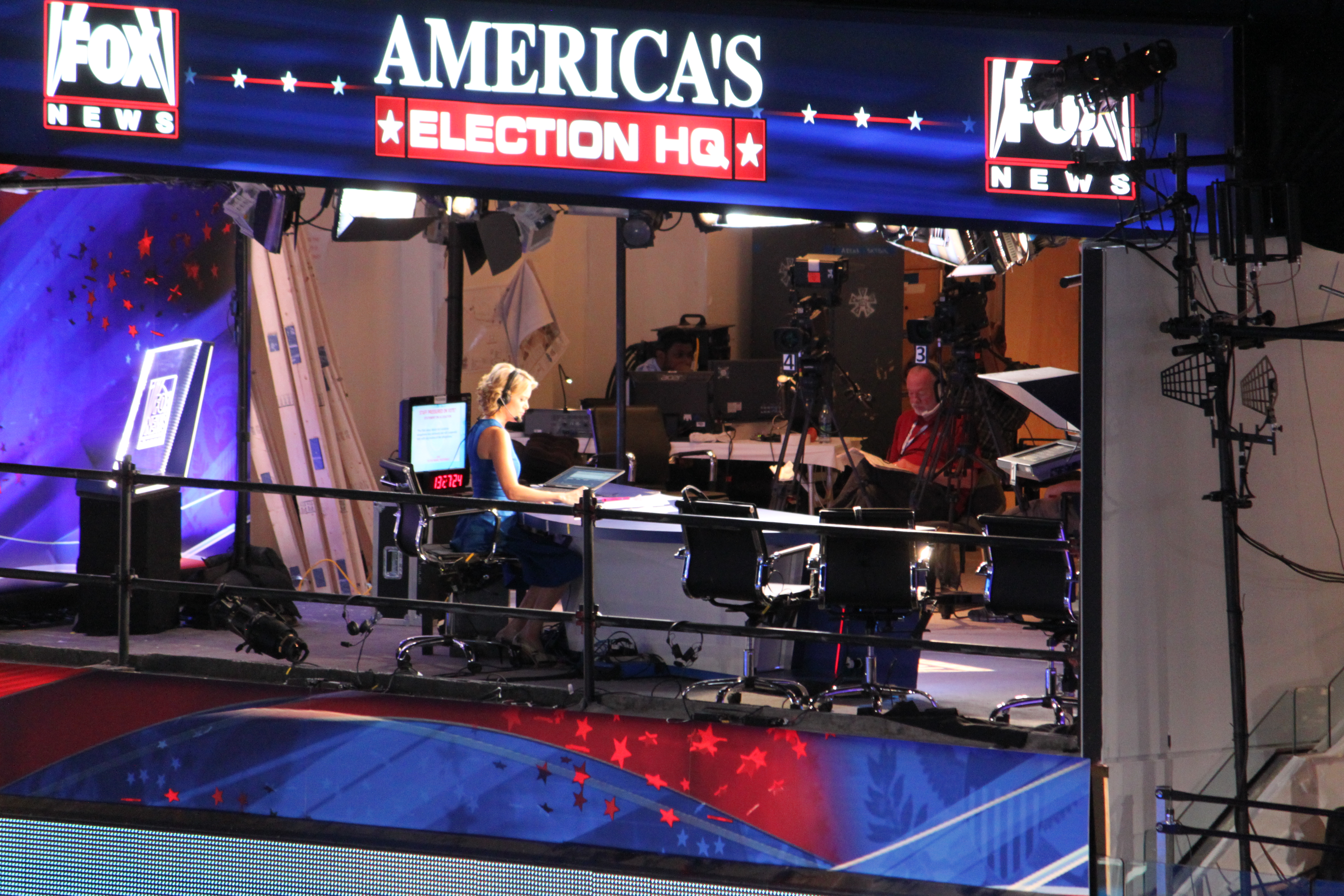
- Genre: Talk/News program/Election
- Presented by: Weekdays: Shannon Bream; Election Night(s): Megyn Kelly; Bret Baier; Bill Hemmer; Martha McCallum; Weekends Eric Shawn; Arthel Neville
- Country of origin: United States
- Original language: English

Production
- Production location: New York City
- Camera setup: Multi-camera
- Running time: 60 minutes

Original release
- Network: Fox News
- Release: February 25 – November 5, 2008

America's Election Headquarters is a news program focusing on news concerning national elections and current affairs broadcast on the Fox News that formerly appeared weekdays 5pm (and later 2pm) Eastern Time and various times in the weekends during election years.

== During The Obama Era ==
=== 2008 elections ===
America's Election Headquarters debuted during the 2008 United States election season. The show was originally hosted by Megyn Kelly and Bill Hemmer in its first run. On June 10, 2008, the show was replaced by a new series called Just In, starring conservative talk radio host Laura Ingraham. Ingraham's show was short-lived (whether or not this was by design has not been determined), and on July 7 America's Election Headquarters returned, hosted by E. D. Hill, who formerly hosted America's Pulse on FNC.

Since Hill's hosting stint, various Fox News personalities have served as hosts, including Hemmer and Kelly.

The weekday edition replaced The Big Story.

The title of the show is based on Fox News's slogan of "America's Election HQ", heavily used during the 2008 election season.

America's Election Headquarters was replaced after the Presidential Election on 5 November 2008 with America's News Headquarters. The program remains similar to America's Election HQ and it is on at the same time.

=== Later elections ===
In the later elections of 2010, 2012 and 2014, the name America's Election Headquarters has continued to be used for election analysis and results programming.

== During The Trump Era ==
=== 2016 elections ===
FOX News brought back the America's Election Headquarters brand for the 2016 elections. For the Iowa caucuses, the network built a set at the Embassy Suites, in Des Moines, Iowa, that was used across the network. Megyn Kelly and Bret Baier were primary anchors in Iowa. Starting in March 2016, America's Election Headquarters again replaced America's News Headquarters as Fox News' main weekend programming.

=== Since 2018 elections ===
After the release of Gretchen Carlson, Fox News brought the branding to the 2 PM (ET) hour with host Shannon Bream. Since Megyn Kelly left the newsroom of Fox News, Martha McCallum took the anchor desk as the successor for 2018 United States elections.

America's Election HQ was replaced in 2020 with Fox News Democracy 2020 during 2020 United States election.
