= Whose Boat Is This Boat? =

Book published in 2018

- Language: English
- Publisher: Simon & Schuster
- Publication date: November 6, 2018
- Publication place: United States
- Pages: 24
- ISBN: 978-1982121082

Whose Boat Is This Boat?: Comments That Don't Help in the Aftermath of a Hurricane is a 2018 children's book credited to U.S. President Donald Trump and compiled by the staff of The Late Show with Stephen Colbert. It is composed of statements made by Trump during his visit to affected areas in the aftermath of Hurricane Florence. Proceeds from sales are to be donated to organizations that support victims of both Florence and the later Hurricane Michael. According to The Late Show, as of December 19, 2018, it has sold over 400,000 copies and raised $1.5 million.

== Overview ==
Whose Boat Is This Boat? is composed of quotes made by Donald Trump during his visit to affected areas on September 19, 2018, in the aftermath of Hurricane Florence. The title, according to Stephen Colbert, is drawn from an "impassioned, and truly heartfelt response to this one boat that washed ashore." During his visit, Trump made a number of comments about a boat that had been shipwrecked on the property of a survivor and homeowner in New Bern, North Carolina. These included statements such as "at least you got a nice boat out of the deal"; "Is this your boat? Or did it become your boat?"; and "To see what we're seeing – this boat, I don't know what happened, but this boat just came here."

The book is credited to "Donald J. Trump (by accident)." However, the publisher, Simon & Schuster, credits authorship to The Staff of The Late Show with Stephen Colbert, which it describes as: "bipedal mammals. They were born on earth and currently reside in the New York City area. Their hobbies include kayaking."

Proceeds from the book will go to benefit several charitable organizations aiding victims of the hurricane, including the World Central Kitchen. According to Colbert, publishing the book would ensure that "Donald Trump's comments about that boat are helping in spite of him."

The book's blurb describes it as "An excellent teaching tool for readers of all ages who enjoy learning about empathy by process of elimination." Colbert reflected upon the announcement of the book, "It's the perfect gift for young readers and presidents who don't read."

Simon & Schuster's press release says "Research suggests this will be the first children's book ever published that demonstrates what not to say after a natural disaster." It also quotes company president Jonathan Karp, who wrote:

Donald Trump has described himself as the Ernest Hemingway of Twitter. With this book, he proves himself to be the Dr. Seuss of hurricane literature.

== Release and sales ==
The book was released on November 6, 2018, the same day as the 2018 U.S. midterm elections.

The week of October 21, 2018, it was the second best selling non-fiction book on Amazon.com.

On November 15, 2019, following reports that the book had repeatedly been hidden or gone missing at Coeur d'Alene Public Library in Coeur d'Alene, Idaho, The Late Show donated to the library a rare, oversized "unhideable edition" of the book, measuring four feet (1.2 m) wide and three feet (0.91 m) tall.

== See also ==
- A Day in the Life of Marlon Bundo, a satirical children's book created by Last Week Tonight with John Oliver
- I Am a Pole (And So Can You!), another children's book written by Colbert
