= LifeZette =

American conservative website

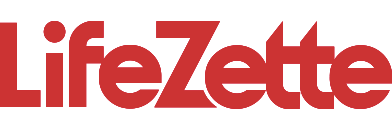
- Website type: News and opinion
- Available in: English
- Founded: October 2014
- Headquarters: 1055 Thomas Jefferson Street, Suite 301; Washington, DC 20007; United States, {{{location_country}}}
- Owners: Katz Group of Companies and Laura Ingraham
- Founders: Laura Ingraham; Peter Anthony
- Key people: Laura Ingraham (Editor-in-chief)
- Website: LifeZette.com
- Advertising: Native
- Registration: Optional, but is required to comment
- Launched: July 2015
- Current status: Online

LifeZette is a conservative American website founded in 2015 by conservative political commentator Laura Ingraham and businessman Peter Anthony. In January 2018, Ingraham confirmed that she had sold the majority stake in LifeZette to The Katz Group, owned by Canadian billionaire Daryl Katz.

LifeZette is based in Washington, D.C. As of 2015, Maureen Mackey was its managing editor and Peter Anthony was its chief executive officer. As was the case with several online-only opinion and commentary outlets, the site received criticism for promoting the Vincent Foster and Seth Rich conspiracy theories in the run-up to the 2016 United States presidential election.

== History ==
Peter Anthony registered LifeZette.com in October 2014. He developed the site with Ingraham and they launched LifeZette in July 2015.

The site first hired outgoing Daily Caller reporter Neil Munro to be its political editor, but Munro withdrew before the site's launch. Quin Hillyer was enlisted to be its political editor, before he was replaced by Keith Koffler in August 2015. Koffler left the site in May 2016 to work at the Washington Examiner.

LifeZette was the first organization called on by Sean Spicer during the initial White House press conference in January 2017. Later, Ingraham was announced as the host of Fox News weeknight program The Ingraham Angle.

In January 2019, LifeZette laid off six staffers.

== Promotion of conspiracy theories ==
Two weeks before the 2016 presidential election, the website posted a video about voting machines possibly being compromised because of links to a company tied to liberal billionaire George Soros.

LifeZette also published a video titled "Clinton Body Count", which promoted conspiracy theories regarding Bill and Hillary Clinton. LifeZette removed the video and later released a statement saying that "[t]he video was made in jest, and merely noted that the theories existed," comparing them to viral videos made by "left-leaning digital outlets like BuzzFeed."
