= I Am America (And So Can You!) =

Book by Stephen Colbert

- Author: Stephen Colbert
- Language: English
- Genre: Political satire Humor
- Publisher: Grand Central Publishing
- Publication date: October 9, 2007
- Publication place: United States
- Media type: Hardback & audiobook
- Pages: 240 pp (1st edition)
- ISBN: 0-446-58050-3 (first edition, hardback)
- OCLC: 166924679
- Dewey Decimal: 818.607 22
- LC Class: PN6165 .I25 2007
- Followed by: America Again; I Am a Pole (And So Can You!)

A sample image of the sticker found on the book, which reads "The Stephen T. Colbert Award for the Literary Excellence"

I Am America (And So Can You!) is a 2007 satirical book by American comedian Stephen Colbert and the writers of The Colbert Report. It was released on October 9, 2007, with the audiobook edition released several days earlier. The book is loosely structured around the fictional life story of Stephen Colbert as he appears on The Colbert Report. As of April 6, 2008, the book had been on the New York Times Bestseller List in the Hardcover Nonfiction category for twenty-four weeks, ranking number one for fourteen of them.

== Description ==
I Am America (And So Can You!) is described as being a "pure extension" of The Colbert Report, delving into the views of Colbert's "well-intentioned, poorly informed high status idiot" character on what he considers to be the most pressing issues facing America. The book is influenced by the literary endeavors of the character's pundit models, such as Bill O'Reilly's book, The O'Reilly Factor (2000) and Sean Hannity's Deliver Us From Evil (2004), which Colbert says he forced himself to read as a reference.

Red margin notes appear throughout the book, providing humorous reactions and counterpoints to Colbert's arguments in a style comparable to the Report's "The Wørd" segment. The cover features a sticker depicting a burning book, declaring I Am America to be a nominee for "The Stephen T. Colbert Award for the Literary Excellence". A sheet of twelve similar stickers are provided inside, with which readers are provided to nominate other books for the award. A second sheet of stickers containing positive expressions such as "Hell Yeah!", "Nailed It!" and "It's Morning In Colbert-ica" is included for readers as bookmarks to remind them "when you agreed with me most."

Colbert, whose character frequently used his show to advertise his own satirical products, frequently promoted I Am America at the time of its release, including in a commercial which depicted the book emerging from an erupting volcano in a manner similar to commercials for Dianetics: The Modern Science of Mental Health. On October 9, 2007, the day of the book's release, Colbert interviewed himself as the show's featured guest. On Meet the Press, he signaled that his book was testing waters for a presidential run, much like other politicians.

== Audiobook cast and crew ==
- Stephen Colbert as Himself and as Gil Honeycomb, oldest man in the world (ch. 2, Stephen Speaks For Me)
- Amy Sedaris as Dolores Grierson, old maid (ch. 1, Stephen Speaks For Me)
- Raymond Whitman as Young Stephen (ch. 2, seven-year-old's note)
- Evelyn McGee as Cow #L73NR, a cow (ch. 3, Stephen Speaks For Me)
- Paul Gilmartin as God, maker of all that is seen and unseen (ch. 4, Stephen Speaks For Me)
- Kevin Dorff as The Guy Sitting Next to You at The Stadium (chs. 5 and 13, Stephen Speaks For Me)
- Allison Silverman as Your Soulmate (ch. 6, Stephen Speaks For Me)
- Paul Dinello as Austin, a formerly gay man (ch. 7, Stephen Speaks For Me)
- Brian Stack as Dr. Bernard Brunner, distinguished professor (ch. 8, Stephen Speaks For Me) and as Thomas Bindlestaff, executive assistant to Mr. Stephen Colbert (ch. 11, Stephen Speaks For Me)
- Jon Stewart as Mort Sinclaire, former TV comedy writer and Communist (ch. 9, Stephen Speaks For Me)
- Greg Hollimon as Rev. George A. Lewis, ex-civil rights leader (ch. 12, Stephen Speaks For Me)
- Paul Dinello - producer/director responsible for the book's abridging
- John McElroy - producer

== Awards ==
The audiobook was nominated for the Grammy Award for Best Spoken Word Album in 2009. The award was ultimately won by Al Gore and his book on global warming, the companion book to the film An Inconvenient Truth.

== See also ==
- America (The Book)
- Earth (The Book)
- I Am a Pole (And So Can You!)
- America Again: Re-becoming The Greatness We Never Weren't

| Preceded by My Grandfather's Son by Clarence Thomas | #1 New York Times Best Seller Non-Fiction (first run); October 28, 2007 – December 2, 2007 | Succeeded by An Inconvenient Book by Glenn Beck and Kevin Balfe |
| Preceded by An Inconvenient Book by Glenn Beck and Kevin Balfe | #1 New York Times Best Seller Non-Fiction (second run); December 16, 2007 – January 13, 2008 | Succeeded by In Defense of Food by Michael Pollan |
