= The Age of Turbulence =

2007 book by Alan Greenspan

The Age of Turbulence: Adventures in a New World
- Hardcover edition
- Authors: Alan Greenspan, Peter Petre
- Language: English
- Subject: Memoir
- Genre: Memoir
- Publisher: Penguin Press
- Publication date: September 17, 2007
- Publication place: United States
- Media type: Hardcover; Audiobook
- Pages: 544 pp. (1st ed.)
- ISBN: 978-1594201318
- OCLC: 122973403
- Dewey Decimal: 332.1/1092 B 22
- LC Class: HB119.G74 A3 2007

The Age of Turbulence: Adventures in a New World is a 2007 memoir of former chairman of the Federal Reserve Alan Greenspan, co-authored by Peter Petre, a former executive editor at Fortune magazine. Published on September 17, 2007, the book debuted at the top of the New York Times Bestseller list for hardcover nonfiction. Penguin Press reportedly paid him an $8 million advance.

== Overview ==
The first half of The Age of Turbulence is an autobiographical chronology of Greenspan's life that shows readers the people and circumstances that helped shape and guide Greenspan—from hours of clarinet and saxophone practice to living-room philosophy with Ayn Rand.

The second half of the book retells several major economic events (primarily within the United States) that have occurred over the past half century. It details his economic endeavors and personal observations while serving under various U.S. presidents and are often intermingled with the economic events. The latter half of the book also includes an analysis and brief history of major global economic constructs—Marxist communism, populism, and various mutations of market capitalism—along with Greenspan's opinions about their relative merits and shortcomings.

Greenspan said that he wrote the book in longhand mostly while soaking in the bathtub, a habit he regularly employed since an accident in 1971, when he injured his back.

=== On free market capitalism ===
In Greenspan's view, free market capitalism is the economic approach that "trumps" other forms attempted thus far in human history. His support of Adam Smith's "invisible hand", i.e., people's motivational self-interest, is foundational to his view of creating a successful, growing economy. He discusses the rapid historical growth of the U.S. economy under market capitalism as well as its benefit to foreign adopters, albeit with persistent dis-functions. His support for market capitalism is not without criticism. This includes the anxiety often expressed within a society as "creative destruction" plays out. Greenspan also decries the lack of quality public secondary education for the "masses", particularly in mathematics and the sciences, and how this problem contributes to the divergence of rich and poor within the United States.

"The book ends on an awkward note that the conditions that led to a substantial reduction in the inflation and interest rates in the past three decades were an accident and are not likely to be repeated. How sad."

=== On presidential economic influence ===
Greenspan's criticisms of President George W. Bush include his refusal to veto new federal legislation, thus increasing spending with unprecedented ease. In Greenspan's opinion, Bush's approach to dealing with the congress has been one of "conflict avoidance", and fulfilling political promises/agendas with little room for compromise or reason. Greenspan writes, "[Republicans in Congress] swapped principle for power; they ended up with neither...they "deserved to lose" the 2006 midterm elections. One of his book's major themes is the "continuing struggle of successive administrations to achieve fiscal balance".

Of all the presidents with whom he worked, Greenspan praises Gerald Ford above all others, but also has high praise for Bill Clinton. His opinion of Clinton's governance was one which maintained "a consistent, disciplined focus on long-term economic growth".

== Reviews ==
The Economist considered the book to be "first-rate", noting that "it engages on different levels: it is intelligent in a way that few popular books on economics manage or even try to be; and, wonder of wonders, it is a good read". The New York Times’s David Leonhardt said that it was "surprisingly frank" and often "downright entertaining". However, he gave it an overall thumbs down ("it isn’t a great memoir") due to Greenspan's "reluctance to be as forthright and penetrating about himself as he is about others".

In the New York Review of Books, Benjamin M. Friedman was largely praising of the book, describing it as "clearly written and easy to read and understand" and says that Greenspan is "forthright in sharing his views on not only policy issues but also the personalities of many of the people with whom he worked during his time in office. His opinions frequently run counter to his well-known Republican political loyalties, which he also makes no effort to hide".

Preceded by Power to the People by Laura Ingraham	#1 New York Times Best Seller Non-Fiction; October 7, 2007 – October 14, 2007	Succeeded by My Grandfather's Son by Clarence Thomas
