= Just In =

2008 American news program

- Genre: Talk show; News
- Presented by: Laura Ingraham
- Country of origin: United States
- Original language: English

Production
- Production location: New York City
- Camera setup: Multi-camera
- Running time: 60 minutes

Original release
- Network: Fox News Channel
- Release: June 16 – July 4, 2008

Related
- America's Election Headquarters; America's Election Headquarters; The Ingraham Angle

Just In with Laura Ingraham is an American news program broadcast on the Fox News Channel weekdays at 5:00 p.m. Eastern Time. The show was hosted by conservative talk radio host Laura Ingraham. The show, said to be a limited trial run, lasted only three weeks on the air before being canceled; it was replaced by the same show that preceded it: America's Election Headquarters.

The show received significant public coverage shortly after its cancellation when a tape of off-air excerpts featuring Ingraham was leaked to the internet. In the nine-minute video Ingraham questions Fox News' style, and describes the show as a "train wreck."

== See also ==
- The Ingraham Angle
