= Power to the People (book) =

2007 book by Laura Ingraham

- Author: Laura Ingraham
- Language: English
- Subject: Politics
- Genre: Non-fiction
- Publisher: Regnery Publishing
- Publication date: September 11, 2007
- Publication place: United States
- Media type: Print (Hardcover)
- Pages: 372 pp
- ISBN: 978-1-59698-516-2
- OCLC: 152580809
- Dewey Decimal: 306.0973/09045 22
- LC Class: HN65 .I64 2007
- Preceded by: Shut Up & Sing: How Elites from Hollywood, Politics, and the UN Are Subverting America
- Followed by: The Obama Diaries

Power to the People is the third book written by conservative radio show host Laura Ingraham. The book was published in 2007 by Regnery Publishing, and details Ingraham's views on the current political and cultural climate, including illegal immigration, the war against Islamofascism, the Supreme Court of the United States, the American education system, and the "pornification" of American culture. In the book, Ingraham describes how ordinary people can take charge and fight for traditional American values, she also presents examples of recent victories against amnesty for illegal immigrants and Verizon Wireless' sponsorship of Akon.

The book also details Ingraham's conversion to Catholicism and her battle with breast cancer.

| Preceded by Giving: How Each of Us Can Change the World by Bill Clinton | #1 New York Times Best Seller Non-Fiction; September 30, 2007 | Succeeded by The Age of Turbulence by Alan Greenspan |
