= Raymond Arroyo =

American author, journalist, and producer (born 1970)

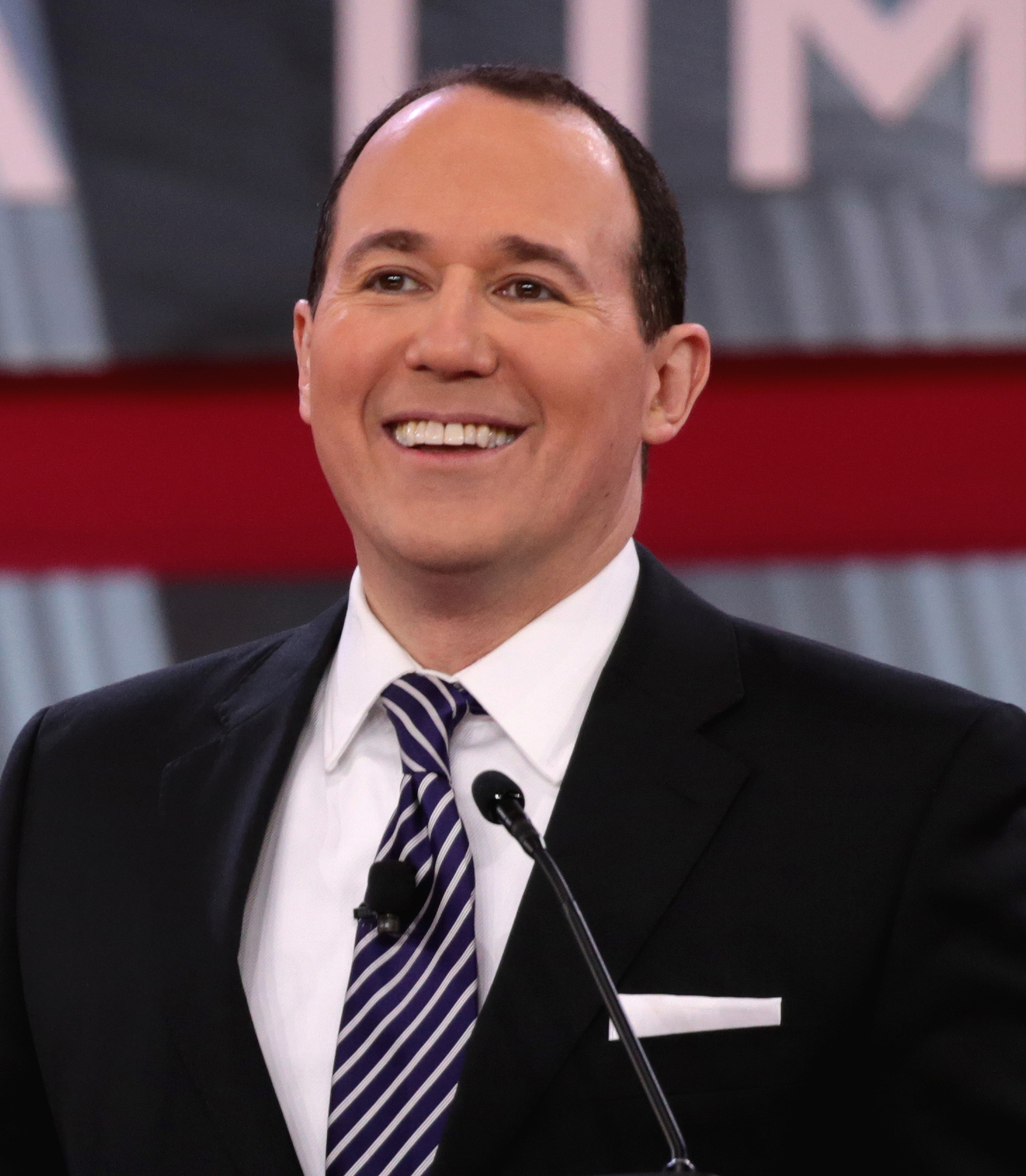
- Born: September 20, 1970 (age 56); New Orleans, Louisiana, U.S.
- Education: New York University Tisch School of the Arts
- Occupations: Author; producer; director; presenter
- Employer: EWTN
- Spouse: Rebecca Arroyo (m. 1994)
- Children: 3
- Website: www.raymondarroyo.com

Raymond Arroyo (born September 20, 1970) is an American author, journalist, and producer. In 1996, he created the EWTN news program The World Over Live and authored the Will Wilder series. He also presents the "Seen and Unseen" and "Friday Follies" segments on Fox News Channel's The Ingraham Angle.

== Early life ==
Arroyo was born in New Orleans, Louisiana, on September 20, 1970. He attended Brother Martin High School and graduated from the Tisch School of the Arts at New York University. He stated on Fox News that his father migrated from Central America and served as a U.S. Marine.

== Career ==
Arroyo worked at the Associated Press, the New York Observer, and for the political columnist team of Evans and Novak. He hosts the news program The World Over Live. As a Fox News contributor, he is a frequent guest and occasional substitute host on The Ingraham Angle. He has been featured on such television shows as The Today Show, Good Morning America, Access Hollywood, The O'Reilly Factor, and CNN Headline News.

== Writing ==
Arroyo's biography of EWTN's founder, Mother Angelica, was a 2007 New York Times bestseller, as were each of Arroyo's following books. He is also the editor of Mother Angelica's Little Book of Life Lessons and Everyday Spirituality (2007 Doubleday), Mother Angelica's Private and Pithy Lessons from the Scriptures (2008 Doubleday), The Prayers and Personal Devotions of Mother Angelica (2010 Doubleday), co-author of, Of Thee I Zing: America's Cultural Decline from Muffin Tops to Body Shots (2011 Threshold Editions) and a series of children's books; Will Wilder: The Relic of Perilous Falls (2017), Will Wilder: The Lost Staff of Wonders (2018 Random House/Crown) and Will Wilder: The Amulet of Power (2019). The Spider Who Saved Christmas was published in 2020 by Sophia Institute Press.

His writings have been published by Newsweek, The Wall Street Journal, The Washington Times, The Financial Times, and National Catholic Register.

== Personal life ==
Arroyo resides in New Orleans, Louisiana, with his wife Rebecca and their three children.

== Books ==
- Arroyo, Raymond (2005). Mother Angelica: The Remarkable Story of a Nun, Her Nerve, and a Network of Miracles. Doubleday Religious. ISBN 978-0-385-51093-6.
- Arroyo, Raymond (2007). Mother Angelica: The Remarkable Story of a Nun, Her Nerve, and a Network of Miracles. Image Books. ISBN 978-0-385-51093-6.
- Arroyo, Raymond (2007). Madre Angelica: La historia notable de una monja, de su nervio, y de una red de milagros. Image Books. ISBN 978-0-385-52116-1.
- Mother Angelica (2007). Raymond Arroyo (ed.). Mother Angelica's Little Book of Life Lessons and Everyday Spirituality. Doubleday Religious. ISBN 978-0-385-51985-4.
- Mother Angelica (2008). Raymond Arroyo (ed.). Mother Angelica's Private and Pithy Lessons From the Scriptures. Doubleday Religious. ISBN 978-0-385-51986-1.
- Mother Angelica (2010). Raymond Arroyo (ed.). The Prayers and Personal Devotions of Mother Angelica. Doubleday Religious. ISBN 978-0-307-58825-8.
- Ingraham, Laura (2011). Of Thee I Zing: America's Cultural Decline from Muffin Tops to Body Shots. Contr. Raymond Arroyo. Threshold. ISBN 978-1-4516-4204-9.
