= America Again =

Book by Stephen Colbert

America Again: Re-becoming The Greatness We Never Weren't
- Author: Stephen Colbert
- Language: English
- Genre: Humor, Political
- Publisher: Grand Central Publishing
- Publication date: October 2, 2012
- Publication place: United States
- Pages: 240
- ISBN: 0446583979
- Preceded by: I Am a Pole (And So Can You!)

America Again: Re-becoming The Greatness We Never Weren't is a 2012 satirical book written by Stephen Colbert and other writers of The Colbert Report as a follow-up to 2007's I Am America (And So Can You!). It is published by Grand Central Publishing. The book was released on October 2, 2012. Its audiobook won the 2014 Grammy Award for Best Spoken Word Album, making for Colbert's second Grammy win, as well as his third Grammy nomination overall.

== Synopsis ==
Colbert addresses topics including Wall Street, campaign finance, energy policy, healthcare, eating on the campaign trail, and the United States Constitution.

== See also ==
- America (The Book)
- Earth (The Book)
- I Am America (And So Can You!)
- I Am a Pole (And So Can You!)
