= My Grandfather's Son =

2007 memoir of Clarence Thomas

My Grandfather's Son: A Memoir
- Author: Clarence Thomas
- Language: English
- Publisher: Harper
- Publication date: October 1, 2007
- Publication place: United States
- Media type: Hardcover; Audiobook
- Pages: 304 (1st ed.)
- ISBN: 978-0-06-056555-8 (1st ed., hardcover)
- OCLC: 166295089
- LC Class: KF8745.T48 A3 2007

My Grandfather's Son: A Memoir is the 2007 memoir of Clarence Thomas, an Associate Justice of the United States Supreme Court.

The book spans all of Thomas's life to the present, beginning with his early childhood in the Deep South and his mother's decision to send him and his brother to be raised by her father and stepmother as she felt unable to care for them. He tells of his upbringing by his grandparents, his time in college and law school, and his career in government. Particular attention is focused on his Supreme Court confirmation hearings. Although the memoir offers little of Thomas's emotional distress over divorcing his first wife, it expounds on his intellectual evolution to conservatism, and the financial troubles that plagued him up through the late 1980s. It also includes a confession about his previously unknown struggle with alcohol.

My Grandfather's Son was praised for its frank tone and well-written style. However, it was also criticized as being too partisan for a sitting Supreme Court Justice and for over-emphasizing claims of victimhood. Much of the media attention centered on his chapters on the confirmation hearings, one of which was titled "Invitation to a Lynching." Thomas received a $1.5 million advance for the book, which hit number one on the New York Times non-fiction best-seller list.

== Summary ==
Thomas describes his life chronologically in My Grandfather's Son. The early parts of the book are dominated by the impact his grandfather had on him, while sections describing his adulthood up to his Supreme Court appointment focus on overcoming personal demons without describing too much about his career. Following his confirmation to the Court, Thomas centers his writing on professional, ideological and judicial issues. The themes of race and self-reliance run throughout, and many issues are framed through one or both of those lenses.

=== Early life and education ===
My Grandfather's Son begins with Thomas's birth in rural Georgia in 1948 to Leola Anderson Thomas, a maid who earned $10 a week. Thomas's father, M.C. Thomas, abandoned the family when Thomas was a toddler. In first grade his mother sent him and his younger brother to live with his maternal grandfather, Myers Anderson, and his wife Christine in Savannah. Anderson, who Thomas and his brother came to call "Daddy", ran a small fuel oil business and kept a strict household. Thomas struggled with racism and segregation throughout his childhood. He attended all black schools until the 10th grade, when Anderson paid for Thomas to attend a Catholic boarding school. Thomas, who had been an altar boy throughout his childhood, wanted to be a priest and was one of only two black students at the school. Upon graduating, he began studying to be a priest, but gave up at the age of 19 because he was disappointed with the church's stance on racism. As a result of Thomas dropping out of school, his grandfather kicked him from the house.

Thomas moved to Massachusetts to attend The College of the Holy Cross. One of his reasons for moving was the racism he had encountered as a child, and his belief that in the North he would be freed from that. Once there, he found Massachusetts to be plagued with latent racism and far from the utopia he had anticipated. Thomas excelled academically and socially at Holy Cross, graduating with honors and marrying his long-term girlfriend Kathy Ambush shortly after. He also began drinking steadily, a problem that would haunt him in later years. Thomas attended Yale Law School, graduating in 1974.

=== Early career ===
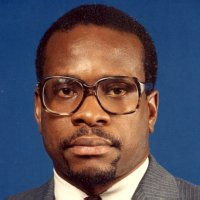
Thomas's official portrait for the EEOC

After Yale, Thomas took a job as an assistant district attorney under John Danforth, then Missouri's Attorney General. My Grandfather's Son continues to follow Thomas's career, including a stint at the legal department of Monsanto Company and his 1979 move to Washington, D.C. to work for then-Senator Danforth. Throughout this period Thomas made an intellectual journey from libertarian to conservative, culminating in changing his party registration to Republican in 1980. In 1981 he joined the Reagan Administration's Department of Education as its Assistant Secretary of Education for the Office of Civil Rights, and in 1982 he was promoted to head of the Equal Employment Opportunity Commission.

The main focus, however, is on Thomas's financial and emotional struggles. Although he says he was never an alcoholic, Thomas says that in the late 1970s and early 1980s his drinking became worse, and that he often drank while home alone. These confessions were the first time there had been any public suggestion that Thomas was a heavy drinker. Burdened by student loans and subsisting on low government salaries, Thomas had a difficult time financially, almost getting evicted from his apartment several times. In one incident, a car rental agent cut up Thomas's credit card in front of him. After falling out of love with his first wife, Thomas worried about the morality of leaving her and his child.

Throughout most of this period Thomas was still estranged from his grandfather, and describes being haunted by the memory of Anderson kicking him out of the house. The two reunited briefly in 1983 when his step-grandmother was in the hospital, having a meaningful conversation and embracing at the end. The newfound closeness was short-lived, and Anderson died the next month of a stroke before Thomas had another chance to see him.

Around this point, Thomas describes himself regaining control of his life. In 1983, he quit drinking cold-turkey. In 1984, Thomas divorced his first wife; however his son moved in with him, which calmed Thomas's fears of abandoning his child as his father had left him. In 1987, he married his second wife, Virginia Lamp, with their marriage effectively ending his financial woes. In 1989, Thomas became a judge for the U.S. Court of Appeals for the D.C. Circuit.

=== Supreme Court confirmation and term ===
Approximately a third of My Grandfather's Son is spent discussing Thomas's nomination and confirmation to the Supreme Court. Thomas says he was initially reluctant to become a Justice, but that when President George H. W. Bush asked him he felt obliged to accept. When the hearings began on September 1, 1991, Thomas expected them to center on race and claims to have had no advance information about Anita Hill's accusations. My Grandfather's Son goes through the hearings day by day, with Thomas defending himself against his accusers and criticizing their motives. Thomas says he learned of the accusations of sexual harassment by Hill over the weekend after the first five days of the hearings when a pair of FBI agents visited his home.

== Reception ==
William Grimes, in his book review for The New York Times, describes Thomas' writing of his time at the Equal Employment Opportunity Commission under President Ronald Reagan (which, Grimes writes, made him an 'object of contempt and derision for mainstream civil rights organizations") as "adopting a defensive crouch, lashing out at his enemies, reopening old wounds and itemizing insults that should be forgotten." Grimes describes Thomas' treatment of the Anita Hill affair as a portrayal of "himself as a persecuted, almost Christlike figure singled out by the liberal establishment, at the behest of his civil rights enemies, not just for criticism but also for total annihilation."

Linguist John McWhorter, in his book review for the NPR, writing on the Anita Hill allegations, says that "And as to Anita Hill, Thomas' case makes it hard to believe her. However, Hill's book makes it equally hard to believe him. I've met both and I find it hard to imagine either of them doing what the other has charged - the debate will continue". He concludes:

Given what he went through with his confirmation hearings, it's understandable that Thomas would be wary of sharing of too much of himself. This means that to truly get the measure of the man, reading My Grandfather's Son can only take us so far. However, does Thomas succeed in trying to revise the accepted vision of him for the better? Pretty much.

Ray Nothstine, in his book review for the Acton Institute, writes that:

Thomas’s book is at times inspiring, sad, yet ultimately triumphant. He had a very fractured relationship with the grandfather who raised him. Not until his grandfather’s death, did he ultimately appreciate the lessons, love, and discipline Myers Anderson [Thomas' grandfather] taught him. It’s by only reading this book will you understand how somebody with a third grade education taught a Yale Law School graduate and Supreme Court Justice so much about life, and yes even conservatism.

Preceded by The Age of Turbulence by Alan Greenspan	#1 New York Times Best Seller Non-Fiction; October 21, 2007	Succeeded by I Am America (And So Can You!) by Stephen Colbert
