= The Ingraham Angle =

American television talk show

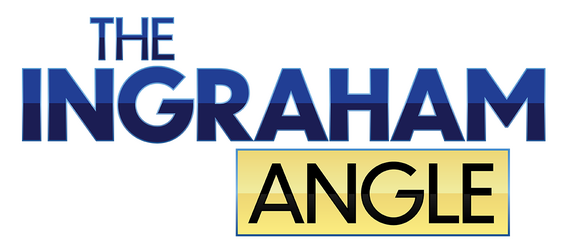
- Genre: Current affairs program Opinion-based conservative talk show
- Presented by: Laura Ingraham; Raymond Arroyo
- Country of origin: United States
- Original language: English
- No. of seasons: 9

Production
- Production locations: Washington, D.C. New York City
- Camera setup: Multi-camera
- Running time: 60 minutes
- Production company: Fox News

Original release
- Network: Fox News
- Release: October 30, 2017 – present

Related
- Just In

The Ingraham Angle is an American conservative news and opinion-based talk show that premiered on October 30, 2017, on the Fox News channel. The show features Laura Ingraham and guests discussing the day's latest issues, news, as well as controversies. The program airs at 7 p.m. ET.

Guest hosts for the program include Raymond Arroyo, Brian Kilmeade, Jason Chaffetz, Kayleigh McEnany and Will Cain.

It is the third highest rated cable TV news program for total viewers.

In 2018, Marjory Stoneman Douglas High School student and shooting survivor David Hogg organized an ongoing boycott of the show following a Twitter post in which Ingraham ridiculed him. The boycott resulted in 27 advertisers dropping the show.

== History ==
In September 2017, Fox News announced The Ingraham Angle as the newest show in their primetime lineup and following Hannity at a new time of 9 PM ET/6 PM PT starting on October 30, 2017. Before the show's debut, news anchors took over the 10 p.m. ET/7 p.m. PT time slot under the branding Fox News Tonight. Prior to hosting The Ingraham Angle, Laura Ingraham had been a guest host, guest panelist, and commentator on various Fox News primetime programs including The O'Reilly Factor and Hannity. She has hosted her weekday radio show since 2001.

The Ingraham Angle's debut program guest was White House Chief of Staff John F. Kelly. The show garnered 3.3 million total viewers with 622,000 news demographic viewers, more than that of MSNBC and CNN. Other guests on The Ingraham Angle have included Univision's Jorge Ramos, former White House Press Secretary Ari Fleischer, attorney and former Harvard Law School professor Alan Dershowitz, former Hillary Clinton State Department advisor and Deputy Secretary of State for Strategic Communications Philippe Reines.

On June 26, 2023, it was announced that The Ingraham Angle would move to 7 p.m. ET beginning July 17, 2023, replacing Jesse Watters Primetime (which is moving to 8 p.m. to replace the cancelled Tucker Carlson Tonight) in its former timeslot.

== Controversies ==
=== LeBron James ===
In February 2018, Ingraham was criticized after she publicly said that basketball star LeBron James should not talk about politics and that he should "shut up and dribble." Professional athletes complained about Ingraham's comment, which was in response to James's statement that then-president Donald Trump "doesn't understand the people, and really don't give a f--- about the people."

=== New Zealand COVID-19 response ===
In October 2020, Ingraham was criticized after she falsely claimed that New Zealand forced arrivals into quarantine "camps" due to COVID-19.

=== Boycotts ===
==== March 2018 boycott ====
On March 28 Ingraham ridiculed college rejections David Hogg received, tweeting: "David Hogg Rejected By Four Colleges To Which He Applied and whines about it. (Dinged by UCLA with a 4.1 GPA...totally predictable given acceptance rates.)"

Hogg responded by accusing Ingraham of cyberbullying and posted a list of Ingraham's advertisers, suggesting they be contacted by his followers. In response to the boycott, 27 advertisers left the show.

The following day, Ingraham tweeted an apology. Hogg said that Ingraham's apology had only been caused by the walkout of several advertisers. He said that he would accept an apology in the future if she denounced the way her network had been treating him and his friends. Hogg and his supporters continued their pressure campaign on her show's advertisers.

At the end of the Good Friday 2018 (March 30, 2018) edition of her show, Ingraham announced she was taking a week-long absence from the show for Easter; a break that was already planned according to Ingraham and Fox News. A week later, on her show, Ingraham characterized the boycott as "Stalinist". Ingraham returned to her show with the support of Rupert Murdoch.

==== Response by advertisers ====
Within a day of Ingraham's comments about Hogg, sponsors started announcing that they would no longer advertise on The Ingraham Angle. Rates for advertising during the show dropped since the start of the boycott. Prices for a 30-second spot dropped from an average range of $12,310–$14,732 to an average range of $11,305–$13,405, according to analysts. Advertising time during the show dropped by as much as 52 percent. By mid-April 2018, a total of 27 sponsors stopped advertising on The Ingraham Angle. As of December 2018, only two major advertisers had returned to sponsoring the show.

===== Reaction to March 2018 boycott =====
Following Ingraham's tweet, responses, and Hogg's tweets, polls showed that public perception of Fox News declined more than that of any advertiser. Polling by YouGov BrandIndex in the days following the announcement of the boycott showed that the Fox News brand had sustained significantly more consumer perception damage than any of the advertisers. The positive consumer perception of Ingraham dropped from 53 percent to 33 percent, according to the celebrity data and research firm Spotted.

Hundreds of Russian bots on Twitter came to Ingraham's defense during the weekend following the boycott. According to Hamilton 68, posts under the hashtag #IStandWithLaura jumped 2800 percent and was the top trending hashtag for Russian Twitter accounts.

Ingraham was supported by singer and NRA board member Ted Nugent, and talk show host Bill Maher who defended her on the grounds of free speech. Republican strategist Steve Schmidt speculated why Ingraham's advertisers pulled their support: "...this kid's not scared. He's not scared of the NRA. He's not intimidated and scared by Laura Ingraham."

Fox News co-president Jack Abernethy issued a statement of support for Ingraham: "We cannot and will not allow voices to be censored by agenda-driven intimidation efforts."

Following Ingraham's return to the show on April 9, AdAge reported that as of the April 11 Wednesday night episode of The Ingraham Angle, the show averaged 2.7 million viewers with 559,000 in the 25-to-54 viewer age demographic. In comparison, the show averaged 2.2 million viewers and 434,484 in the same demographic on March 29, 2018. According to TheWrap, viewership for the week of Ingraham's return to the show were up 25 percent for 2018 at 3,099,000 total viewers and up 36 percent for the age 25 to 54 demographic with 685,000 viewers. In June, the show earned 2.654 million total viewers per night, the best monthly average since the show was launching in October 2017.

==== June 2018 boycott ====
Twenty-seven sponsors stopped advertising on the show due to the March boycott. The controversy surrounding the boycott resulted in a decline of favorable public perceptions of the Fox News brand. Upon Ingraham's return to the show on April 9 following a week-long vacation, The Ingraham Angle occupied the top position for its time slot against CNN and MSNBC. Following Ingraham's comments on her show regarding facilities used to detain minor children separated from their undocumented immigrant parents, David Hogg renewed his call for boycotts of The Ingraham Angle's advertisers. During the show's June 18, 2018 broadcast, Ingraham referred to the detention facilities as "essentially summer camps" that "resemble boarding schools." In response, Hogg called for a renewal of the previous boycott via Twitter the following day. Ingraham's comments followed an MSNBC report by Jacob Soboroff which was broadcast on June 14, 2018. The report described a Texas detainment facility setup to be like a "dormitory structure" with a cafeteria and rooms that contained four beds in each.

== Ratings ==
According to Variety magazine, The Ingraham Angle was the third-highest rate cable TV news program in the adults 25–54 demographic among all cable news programs in June 2018. A year later, Ingraham's show had declined in popularity to fourth behind MSNBC's The Rachel Maddow Show, according to a Fox News press release. As of January 2020, the show has returned to its former spot as the third highest rated cable news show, gathering more viewers than any cable news show during its time slot, including The Rachel Maddow Show. The show's higher ratings than The Rachel Maddow Show made Ingraham the highest-rated female cable news host.

== See also ==
- Just In, previous show on Fox News hosted by Ingraham
- The Laura Ingraham Show
- List of programs broadcast by Fox News

Preceded by Special Report	The Ingraham Angle; 7:00 PM – 8:00 PM	Succeeded by Jesse Watters Primetime
