= I Am a Pole (And So Can You!) =

2012 children's book spoof

- Author: Stephen Colbert
- Illustrator: Paul Hildebrand
- Language: English
- Publisher: Grand Central Publishing
- Publication date: May 8, 2012
- Publication place: United States
- Media type: Print – Hardcover
- Pages: 32
- ISBN: 978-1-4555-2342-9
- Preceded by: I Am America (And So Can You!)
- Followed by: America Again: Re-Becoming the Greatness We Never Weren't

I Am a Pole (And So Can You!) is a 2012 spoof of inspirational children's books. It was written by Stephen Colbert and illustrated by Paul Hildebrand. The book tells the story of a fictional pole finding his purpose in life. The title is a play on Colbert's first book, I Am America (And So Can You!). All proceeds from the audiobook go to the United States Veterans Initiative, a non-profit dedicated to returning troops.

The book contains a blurb of endorsement on the cover attributed to children's writer Maurice Sendak. During a January 2012 interview of Sendak by Colbert, Colbert shared a draft of the book with Sendak, to which Sendak stated "The sad thing is, I like it!"; the statement was used as the blurb for the cover. Soon afterward, Colbert reportedly secured a publishing deal for the book. Sendak coincidentally died the morning of the book's release, and, in tribute, The Colbert Report aired uncensored previously unreleased clips of the interview, with Colbert encouraging those unfamiliar with Sendak's work to "read his books. And for those who don't read, they've got lots of pictures."

Reviewers of the book noted that this book, while seemingly targeted to children, contains imagery which may be considered adult in nature, such as a scene of a stripper performing striptease on the eponymous pole. Colbert, parodying the marketing of inspirational books, mentioned on his show that the book is "the perfect gift to give a child, or grandchild, for their high school or college graduation. Also, Father's Day. Also, other times."

On July 18, 2012, the Rosenbach Museum added the book to its collections, and displayed its manuscript and several artifacts that Colbert claimed were on his desk when the book was written next to the manuscript of Ulysses, along with artifacts from the original interview.

Other formats:

- Ebook – ISBN 978-1-4555-2340-5
- Compact Disc – ISBN 978-1-61969-502-3

== See also ==
- America (The Book)
- Earth (The Book)
- America Again: Re-becoming The Greatness We Never Weren't
- Whose Boat Is This Boat?
- A Day in the Life of Marlon Bundo
