= The Obama Diaries =

2010 book by Laura Ingraham

- Author: Laura Ingraham
- Language: English
- Publisher: Threshold Editions
- Publication date: July 13, 2010
- Publication place: United States
- Media type: Hardback
- Pages: 304
- ISBN: 1-4391-9751-2

The Obama Diaries is a book written by Laura Ingraham and published by Simon & Schuster on July 13, 2010. It reached the number 1 position on the New York Times Best Seller list published August 1, 2010, staying at number 2 for approximately one month after that.

== Fiction or non-fiction ==
Whether to list the book as fiction or non-fiction was disputed. The New York Times and USA Today classified it as non-fiction on their Best Seller list, but made the clear distinction that it is satire, and therefore more spurious than fact.
