= An Inconvenient Book =

2007 book by Glenn Beck

An Inconvenient Book: Real Solutions to the World’s Biggest Problems
- Cover
- Author: Glenn Beck
- Illustrator: Paul Nunn
- Cover artist: George Lange
- Language: English
- Subject: Various political issues, from global warming to divorce.
- Genre: Political Non-fiction
- Publisher: Simon & Schuster
- Publication date: November 20, 2007
- Publication place: United States
- Pages: 295
- ISBN: 1-4165-5219-7
- OCLC: 153772883
- Dewey Decimal: 973.92 22
- LC Class: E169.12 .B335 2007

An Inconvenient Book: Real Solutions to the World's Biggest Problems is a 2007 political narrative written and edited by conservative commentator Glenn Beck.

== Explanation of the book's title ==
The title of An Inconvenient Book is a parody of the title of Al Gore's 2006 documentary An Inconvenient Truth. One section of the book provides a critical response to Gore's views on global warming.

== Issues discussed ==
Beck discusses his political views on a number of subjects. Issues include Beck’s claims that the free market provides the best way to fight global warming, divorce rates, Beck's perceptions of liberal bias on school campuses, the income gap, perceived anti-Americanism of the United Nations, and illegal immigration.

== Reception ==
Publishers Weekly described An Inconvenient Book as "a good read for conservatives," referring to Beck's often lighthearted tone, "at his best when most absurd, and funniest when he's his own target." On the content, the reviewer says "While often informative, as in his chapter on global warming, Beck is sometimes tedious, particularly when dealing with Islam and education (France is literally teetering on the edge, and our biggest ally, England, is about to be turned inside out as well)."

An Inconvenient Book entered The New York Times Best Seller List at Number 1 under the category Hardcover Nonfiction, and stayed in the list for 17 weeks.
