= Laura Ingraham =

American radio and television host (born 1963)

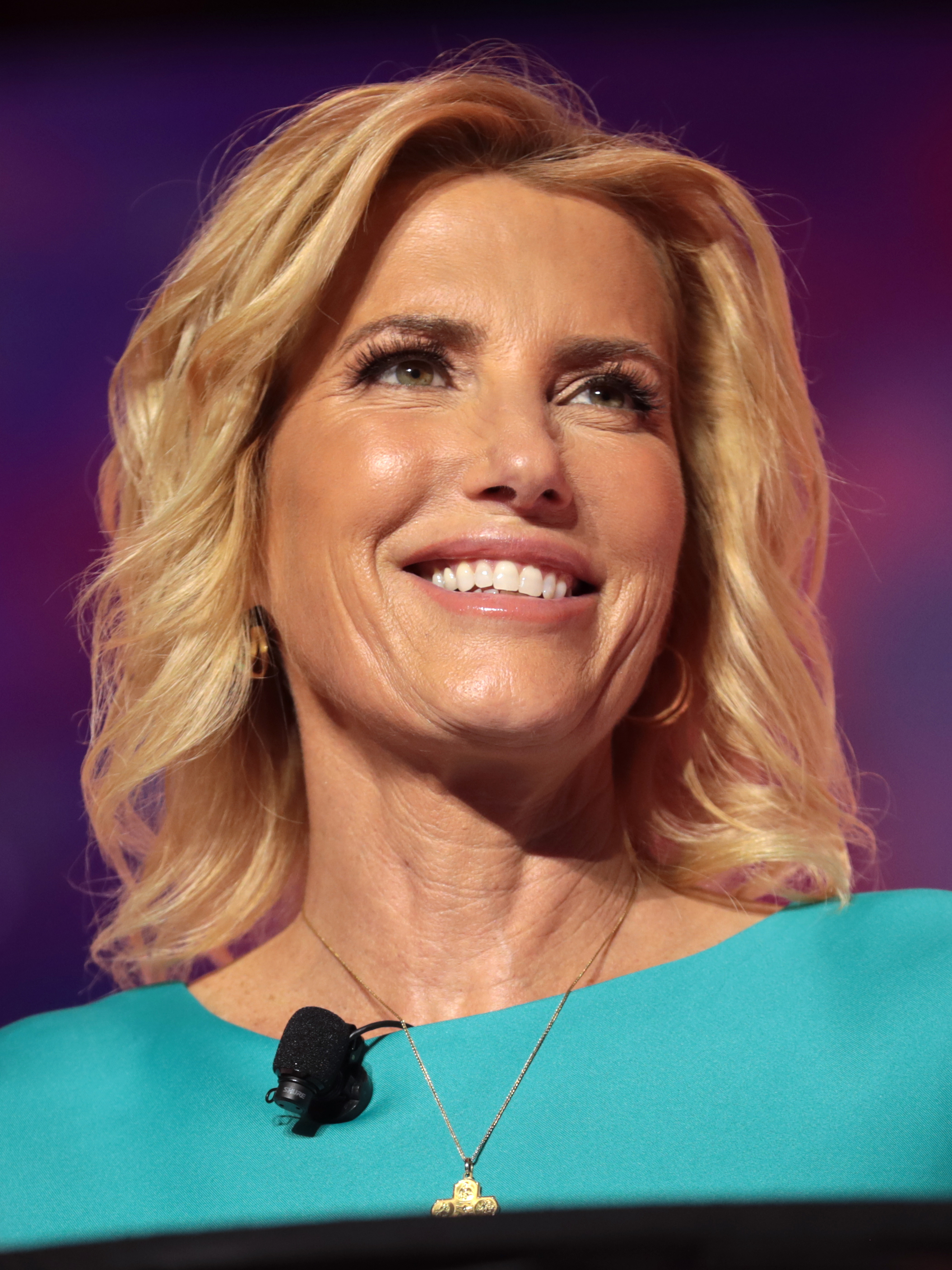
- Ingraham in 2022
- Born: Laura Anne Ingraham; June 19, 1963 (age 63); Glastonbury, Connecticut, U.S.
- Education: Dartmouth College (BA); University of Virginia (JD)
- Occupations: Author; television presenter
- Political party: Republican
- Movement: Tea Party movement
- Children: 3
- Website: lauraingraham.com

Laura Anne Ingraham (/ˈɪŋɡrəm/; born June 19, 1963) is an American conservative author and television presenter. She has been the host of The Ingraham Angle on Fox News Channel since October 2017, and is the editor-in-chief of LifeZette. She formerly hosted the nationally syndicated radio show The Laura Ingraham Show.

Ingraham worked as a speechwriter in the Reagan administration in the late 1980s. She earned a Juris Doctor degree from the University of Virginia in 1991 and was a law clerk to U.S. Supreme Court justice Clarence Thomas. She then worked for the law firm Skadden, Arps, Slate, Meagher & Flom in New York City. Ingraham began her media career in the mid-1990s. Ingraham is known for her support for Donald Trump and acted as an informal advisor during his first presidency.

== Early life and education ==
Ingraham grew up in Glastonbury, Connecticut, where she was born to Anne Caroline (née Kozak) and James Frederick Ingraham III. Her maternal grandparents were Polish immigrants and her father was of Irish and English ancestry. She has two brothers. She graduated from Glastonbury High School in 1981.

Ingraham studied English literature and Russian at Dartmouth College, graduating in 1985 with a Bachelor of Arts. After college, Ingraham spent several years as a speechwriter for President Ronald Reagan's domestic policy advisor. She then attended the University of Virginia School of Law, where she was a notes editor for the Virginia Law Review. She graduated with a Juris Doctor in 1991.

== Career ==
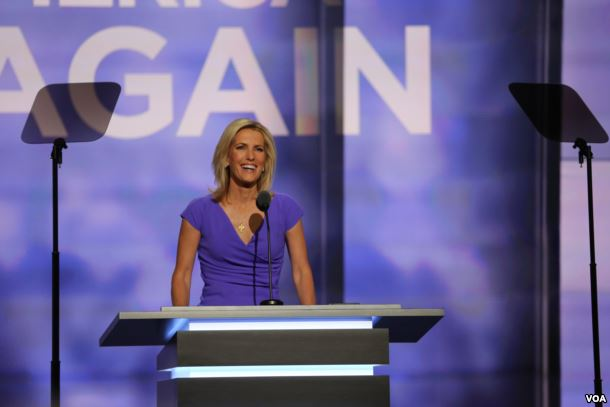
Ingraham speaking at the 2016 Republican National Convention

In the late 1980s, Ingraham worked as a speechwriter in the Reagan administration for the domestic policy advisor. She also briefly served as editor of The Prospect, the magazine issued by Concerned Alumni of Princeton.

After graduating from law school in 1991, Ingraham was a law clerk for Judge Ralph K. Winter Jr. of the U.S. Court of Appeals for the Second Circuit from 1991 to 1992 and for Supreme Court justice Clarence Thomas from 1992 to 1993. She then worked as an attorney at the law firm Skadden, Arps, Slate, Meagher & Flom. In 1995, she appeared on the cover of The New York Times Magazine in connection with a story about young conservatives.

In 1996, she and Jay P. Lefkowitz organized the first Dark Ages Weekend in response to Renaissance Weekend.

=== Television host ===
Ingraham has had three stints as a cable television host. She first became a host on MSNBC in 1996. In the late 1990s, she became a CBS commentator and hosted the MSNBC program Watch It!. Several years later, on her radio program, Ingraham began campaigning for another cable television show. In 2008, Fox News Channel gave her a three-week trial run for a new show entitled Just In. In October 2017, she became the host of a new Fox News Channel program, The Ingraham Angle.

=== Radio host ===
Ingraham launched The Laura Ingraham Show in April 2001. The show was heard on 306 stations and on XM Satellite Radio. It was originally syndicated by Westwood One, but moved to Talk Radio Network in 2004. In 2012, Ingraham was rated as the No. 5 radio show in America by Talkers Magazine. In November 2012, she announced her departure from Talk Radio Network, declining to renew her contract with TRN after nearly a decade of being associated with the network. She was the second major host from TRN's lineup to leave the network that year: TRN's other major program, The Savage Nation, left TRN two months earlier. Her new program, syndicated by Courtside Entertainment Group, began airing on January 2, 2013, and went off the air in December 2018. Ingraham continues to produce podcast material for Courtside's PodcastOne division.

=== LifeZette ===
LifeZette is a conservative American website founded in 2015 by Ingraham and businessman Peter Anthony. In January 2018, Ingraham confirmed that she had sold the majority stake in LifeZette to The Katz Group, owned by Canadian billionaire Daryl Katz.

== Books ==
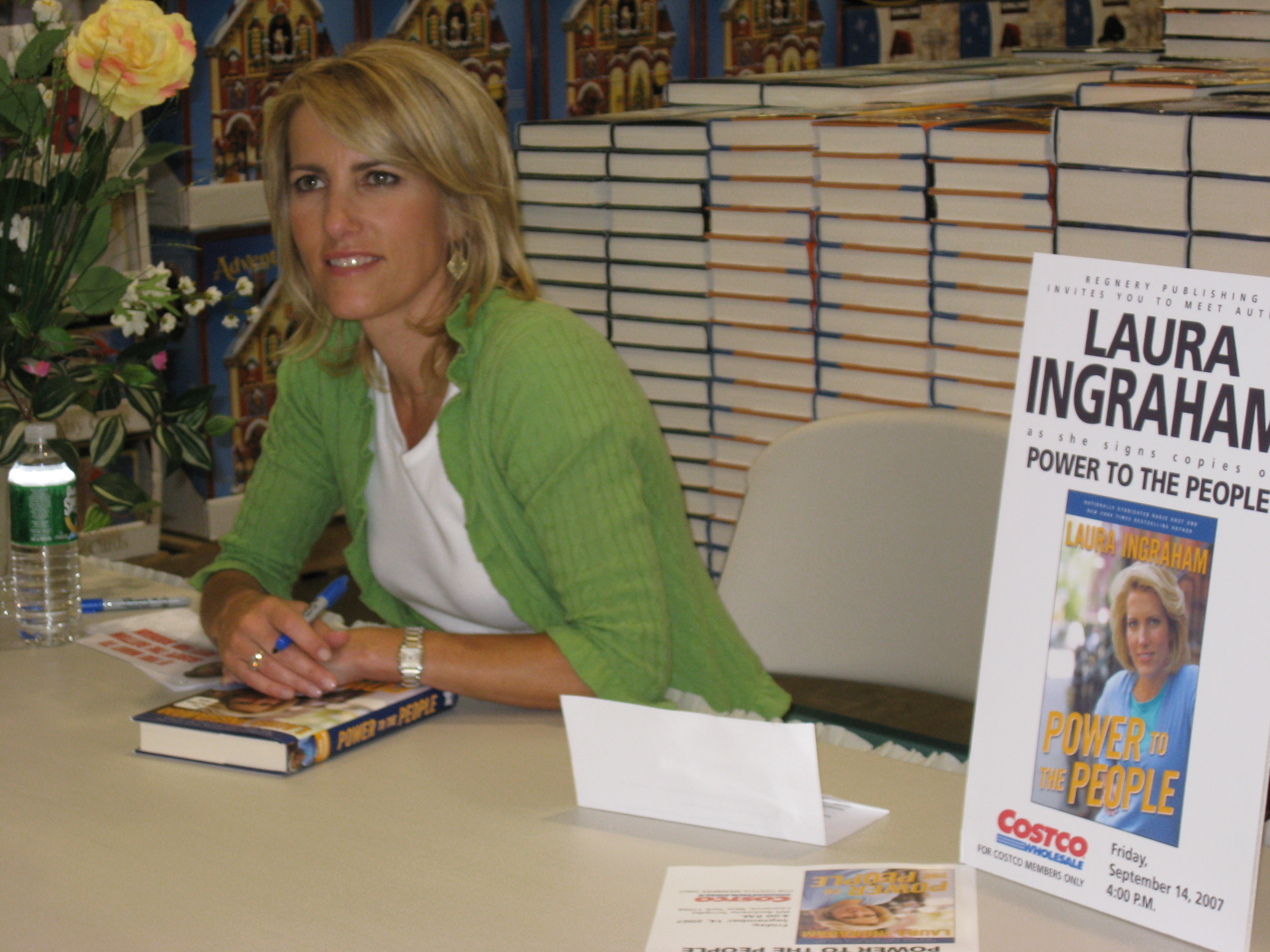
Ingraham at a book signing in 2007

- The Hillary Trap: Looking for Power in All the Wrong Places, first published June 2000 and updated in 2005, accuses Hillary Clinton of being a faux feminist whose "liberal feminism has created a culture that rewards dependency, encourages fragmentation, undermines families, and celebrates victimhood".
- Shut Up & Sing: How Elites from Hollywood, Politics, and the UN Are Subverting America, published October 25, 2003, decries liberal elites in politics, the media, academia, arts and entertainment, business, and international organizations, and praises Middle Americans as "the kind of people who are the lifeblood of healthy democratic societies".
- Power to the People, a New York Times number one best seller, published September 11, 2007, focuses on what Ingraham calls the "pornification" of America and stresses the importance of popular participation in culture, promoting conservative values in family life, education and patriotism.
- The Obama Diaries, a New York Times number one best seller, published July 13, 2010, is a fictional collection of diary entries purportedly made by President Barack Obama, which Ingraham uses satirically to criticize Obama, his family, and his administration.
- Of Thee I Zing, a New York Times best seller, published July 12, 2011, is a collection of humorous anecdotes meant to point out the decline of American culture, from muffin tops to body shots.
- Billionaire at the Barricades, published 2017, explains the 2016 election victory of Donald Trump as the continuation of a populist revolution, initiated by Ronald Reagan, with working class support.

== Political views ==
Ingraham has been described as reactionary, "no stranger to generating controversy" by Variety and as a "name-brand provocateur" by Politico. Business Insider has referred to Ingraham's on-air style as "wad[ing] into debates on racism and gun violence". Ingraham has said that her influences include Ronald Reagan, Robert Bork, and Pat Buchanan.

=== Homosexuality ===
In her senior year at Dartmouth College, during her tenure as editor-in-chief of independent campus newspaper The Dartmouth Review, Ingraham wrote several controversial articles. She sent a reporter undercover in 1984 to a campus Gay Students Association meeting, and later received criticism when, despite an oath of confidentiality being read to participants, Ingraham published a transcript of the meeting and included the names of the attendees, describing them as "cheerleaders for latent campus sodomites". Ingraham argued that confidentiality did not apply because the meeting had been advertised, and defended the outing of the gay students as a "freedom of the press issue". Jeffrey Hart, the faculty adviser for The Dartmouth Review, described Ingraham as having "the most extreme anti-homosexual views imaginable", and said "she went so far as to avoid a local eatery where she feared the waiters were homosexual".

In 1997, Ingraham wrote an essay in The Washington Post in which she stated that she had changed her views on homosexuality after witnessing "the dignity, fidelity, and courage" with which her gay brother, Curtis, and his partner coped with the latter being diagnosed with AIDS; Curtis's partner ultimately died of the disease. Ingraham has stated that she supports civil unions between same-sex partners, but believes marriage "is between a man and a woman".

In 2022, Ingraham aired an extensive report about the case of William and Zachary Zulock, two gay men from the state of Georgia who were convicted of abusing their adoptive children. Ingraham called the Zulocks "LGBTQ+ activists" and interviewed a Townhall reporter who falsely stated that the case's problem was that an adoption agency had assisted a same-sex couple.

=== Immigration and race ===
Ingraham is a frequent critic of immigration and has expressed anti-immigration views. She opposed the proposed bipartisan 2013 US Senate comprehensive immigration reform plan. In 2014, Ingraham said that allowing more immigrant workers to come to the United States would be "obscene to the American experience". In 2014, she denounced House majority leader Eric Cantor after he expressed support for the DREAM Act and a GOP bill to grant a pathway to citizenship for young immigrants. At the time, Cantor faced a primary challenge from Dave Brat, which he would go on to lose. According to The New York Times, "Few people did more than Ms. Ingraham to propel Mr. Brat ... from obscurity to national conservative hero." Ingraham said the race would go "down as one of the most significant repudiations of establishment immigration reform that I've seen in my 20 years of doing politics", and that due to the outcome of the race, "immigration reform is DOA". That same year, Ingraham harshly criticized Republican congresswoman Renee Ellmers for expressing support for a comprehensive immigration bill which included a pathway to citizenship for the 11 million undocumented immigrants who were in the country at the time. In an interview with Ellmers, Ingraham accused her of supporting amnesty and using liberal talking points, and said her arguments were "infuriating to my listeners".

In September 2014, Ingraham claimed that then-president Barack Obama sent assistance to Africa during the 2014 Ebola outbreak and exposed Americans to the virus because of his guilt over "colonialism".

In September 2017, amid reports that Trump was considering an agreement with Democrats on amnesty for approximately 800,000 DREAMers, Ingraham criticized him, tweeting "When does American working class w/out real wage increase in 15yrs & who send their kids to overcrowded public schools get amnesty?" In July 2018, Ingraham harshly criticized Republican congressman Kevin Yoder after he expressed support for a Democratic bill that rolled back Attorney General Jeff Sessions' order that immigration judges not be allowed to grant asylum to asylum seekers fleeing domestic abuse or gang violence in their home country. She called on the congressman "to stop selling out the Trump agenda".

In February 2018, Ingraham said NBA players LeBron James and Kevin Durant should "shut up and dribble" after James called comments by Trump "laughable and scary". When her statement was criticized, Ingraham said there was no racial intent in her remarks and cited her 2003 book Shut Up & Sing and other instances when she had said performers should "shut up" about politics. In 2020, when Drew Brees, a white athlete, criticized protesters who kneeled during the U.S. national anthem, Ingraham was criticized for supporting his statements, which she had not done in the earlier case with the African-American athletes.

Ingraham defended the Trump administration's "zero-tolerance" family separation policy for children of illegal immigrants, and in a June 18, 2018, broadcast compared the children's facilities to "summer camps" that "resemble boarding schools". She further described criticism of the policy as "faux liberal outrage". Ingraham had referred to the border crossings as "slow-rolling invasion of the United States". School shooting survivor and activist David Hogg, who had led a previous campaign to pressure advertisers to leave The Ingraham Angle, called for a second boycott, but advertisers interviewed by The Hollywood Reporter on June 19 did not plan to leave the show.

==== Great Replacement theory ====
Ingraham has objected to the changing racial demographics of The United States. In August 2018, she stated "some parts of the country it does seem like the America we know and love doesn't exist anymore. Massive demographic changes have been foisted upon the American people. And they're changes that none of us ever voted for, and most of us don't like... much of this is related to both illegal and, in some cases, legal immigration that, of course, progressives love."

Various commentators criticized Ingraham's comments, with The Atlantic claiming she was alluding to the U.S. becoming "less and less white with every passing year". Many outlets argued that it echoed white nationalist rhetoric or that itself constituted a "white nationalist rant". Ingraham's comments were endorsed by white supremacist and former Klansman David Duke. In response, Ingraham called Duke a "racist freak whose name I won't even mention". Some mainstream media described Ingraham's views as advocating the white genocide conspiracy theory. In her August 9, 2018 Ingraham Angle monologue, Ingraham stated she was not talking about "race or ethnicity" and went on to say, "There is something slipping away in this country and it's not about race or ethnicity. It's what was once a common understanding by both parties that American citizenship is a privilege, and one that at a minimum requires respect for the rule of law and loyalty to our constitution."

In October 2018, Ingraham urged her audience to vote Republican in the upcoming midterm elections, saying that Democrats "want to replace you, the American voters, with newly amnestied citizens and an ever-increasing number of chain migrants."

In May 2019, Ingraham showed a graphic on her show of "prominent voices censored on social media", which included "people who believe in border enforcement, people who believe in national sovereignty." Among those listed was Paul Nehlen, known for making numerous anti-Semitic remarks, who was banned from Twitter after making racist remarks about Meghan Markle, the wife of Prince Harry.

In June 2019, she spread unsubstantiated claims that asylum seekers to the United States may carry the Ebola virus.

=== Economics ===
Ingraham has supported deregulation and has spoken against lawsuits. In 2021 Ingraham suggested getting rid of unemployment benefits for people capable of work. In September 2022, Ingraham criticized the Biden administration's student loan forgiveness program, stating that her mother worked as a waitress until she was 73 to pay for Ingraham's loans. Ingraham was criticized on Twitter with some asking why she let her mother work into her 70s to pay her debt, while she had held a number of high-paying positions in government, law and the media.

=== Foreign policy ===
Ingraham advocated for the 2003 invasion of Iraq. However, during the 2016 Republican Party presidential primaries, she said she considered the Iraq war a mistake, and criticized "Bushism" as Trump ran against Jeb Bush. In August 2019, Ingraham condemned China's "brutal violation of basic human rights" and China's Xinjiang re-education camps for Muslim ethnic minority groups. Ingraham is a supporter of Israel, which she called "one of our closest allies". She criticized Ilhan Omar's description of Israel as an apartheid regime.

=== Donald Trump ===
Ingraham is known for her strong support for Donald Trump. During his first presidency, she acted as an informal advisor to the administration, flouting journalistic ethical norms. In 2016 after Trump became the Republican nominee Ingraham expressed support for Trump during her speech at the Republican National Committee. In June 2019, Ingraham mocked reports that Trump had delayed his participation in D-Day commemoration activities to sit for an interview with her, strongly dismissing them as "patently false—fake news", despite video of the interview showing Trump saying, "These people are so amazing, and what they don't realize is that I'm holding them up because of this interview, but that's because it's you."

==== January 6 United States Capitol attack conspiracy theories ====
Following the attack on the United States Capitol by Trump supporters on January 6, 2021, Ingraham was among those who advanced the conspiracy theory that people associated with antifa were responsible. During the attack, she had texted Trump's chief of staff, Mark Meadows, "Mark, the president needs to tell people in the Capitol to go home. This is hurting all of us. He is destroying his legacy." However, she downplayed Trump supporter involvement that evening on Ingraham Angle, stating, "They were likely not all Trump supporters. I have never seen Trump rally attendees wearing helmets, black helmets, brown helmets, black backpacks — the uniforms you saw in some of these crowd shots." She later ridiculed four members of the Capitol Police and D.C. Police who had responded to the insurrection, after they testified to House lawmakers on July 27, 2021.

==== FBI search of Mar-a-Lago ====
In 2022, Ingraham criticized the Justice Department and FBI for the search of Trump's private club and residence, Mar-a-Lago, over his handling of classified information, but suggested that Republican voters might "turn the page" and back another 2024 presidential candidate "if we can get someone who has all Trump's policies, who's not Trump".

=== COVID-19 pandemic ===
==== Anti-vaccination conspiracy theories ====
During the coronavirus pandemic, Ingraham repeatedly questioned vaccine legitimacy, and instead pushed for the use of the unproven drug hydroxychloroquine as treatment for coronavirus disease 2019 (COVID-19). She characterized it as a miracle drug and booked guests on her show to promote the drug. She mocked Centers for Disease Control and Prevention director Robert R. Redfield after he cautioned against the drug. After a study was released which tested the drug on 368 Veterans Affairs patients and showed that the drug was associated with an increased risk of death, she attacked the study as "shoddy", "shockingly irresponsible" and "agenda-driven". She questioned whether attempts to "disprove effectiveness" of the drug was "triggered by pure hatred of Trump? Of Fox? Of me?" On June 15, 2020, the Food and Drug Administration revoked the Emergency Approval of hydroxychloroquine (and chloroquine). FDA said that a review of some studies showed that the drugs' potential benefits in treating COVID-19 did not outweigh the risks. Ingraham was an early media proponent of the anti-parasite drug ivermectin as a treatment for COVID-19 (a use not recommended by the FDA), and promoted a conspiracy theory that doctors and officials "vilify and dismiss and demean, and, frankly, lie about it, the effectiveness of these drugs".

==== Other COVID-19 criticisms ====
In May 2020, Ingraham criticized requirements that people wear face masks in public as a way to halt the spread of the coronavirus.

She gave airtime to Harmeet Dhillon, a Republican operative who filed lawsuits against California to stop the implementation of stay-at-home orders intended to halt the spread of the coronavirus. She praised her as "leading the charge to keep Gavin Newsom's power grabs in check."

In October 2020, Ingraham and her guest Victor Davis Hanson spread misinformation about New Zealand's response to the pandemic on her show. Referring to a "terrifying new response" which was months old, she called New Zealand's managed isolation facilities "camps" when they are in fact lavish hotels.

=== Gun issues ===
Ingraham warned Trump not to support gun control; after comments he made in the wake of the Stoneman Douglas High School shooting, Ingraham said in a February 2018 tweet that "If the President @realDonaldTrump dives on the 2nd [Amendment], he won't have to worry abt who runs his 2020 campaign."

==== Stoneman Douglas High School shooting and cyberbullying accusations ====
In March 2018, Ingraham's show was boycotted by 27 sponsors after she ridiculed David Hogg, a 17-year-old student survivor of the Stoneman Douglas High School shooting, for supposedly complaining about being rejected by four colleges. In response, Hogg posted a list of Ingraham's advertisers and called for a boycott, accusing her of cyberbullying. After several advertisers left the show Ingraham apologized, which Hogg dismissed as insincere. Advertising time during the show dropped by as much as 52 percent. After Ingraham returned from a vacation following the boycott, her program earned its best ratings ever, spiking 25% in total viewers and saw an increase of 36% in the key 25–54 age group demographic. As of October 2018, companies were continuing to shun Ingraham's show despite the increased ratings.

=== Conspiracy theories ===
Ingraham has promoted conspiracy theories about topics such as the COVID-19 pandemic and the January 6 United States Capitol attack.

Ingraham has promoted the Great Replacement theory and stated that Democrats "want to replace you, the American voters, with newly amnestied citizens and an ever-increasing number of chain migrants". Ingraham also hosted Republicans Jim Banks, Stephen Miller, and Jim Jordan who also endorsed the theory.

During an appearance on Fox & Friends Ingraham promoted the conspiracy theory that the Democratic National Committee was involved in the murder of Seth Rich.

== Personal life ==
Ingraham attended a Baptist church until the age of twelve, later converting to Roman Catholicism. She studied Spanish and Russian.

Ingraham has dated George Conway and Dinesh D'Souza, fellow conservatives.

In April 2005, Ingraham announced that she had undergone treatment for breast cancer.

She is a single parent of three children: a girl, Maria, from Guatemala adopted in 2008; a boy, Michael Dmitri, from Russia adopted in 2009; and a second boy, Nikolai Peter, adopted from Russia in 2011.

== See also ==
- List of law clerks for the tenth seat of the Supreme Court of the United States – Clarence Thomas
