= Series finale of The Colbert Report =

"Same to You, Pal"
- The Colbert Report episode
- Stephen sings "We'll Meet Again" alongside numerous recognizable figures assembled in the studio.
- Episode no.: Season 09; Episode 160
- Directed by: Jim Hoskinson
- Production code: 11040
- Original air date: December 18, 2014

Guest appearances
- See full list of cameos featured

Episode chronology
← Previous; Episode 1,446	Next → —
- List of The Colbert Report episodes (2014)

"Same to You, Pal" is the series finale of American late-night comedy television series The Colbert Report. It is the 1,447th episode of the series overall and is the final episode of the ninth season. The final episode of The Colbert Report originally aired in the United States on December 18, 2014, on Comedy Central. In the episode, Stephen becomes immortal after accidentally killing "Grimmy" during the opening of the segment of "Cheating Death with Dr. Stephen T. Colbert, D.F.A.". This leads to Stephen singing "We'll Meet Again" in its entirety with a large crowd of several recognizable figures, before meeting with Santa Claus, Abraham Lincoln, and Alex Trebek on the roof of the studio.

In April 2014, Stephen Colbert was chosen to replace David Letterman as the host of Late Show on CBS. It was announced that day that The Colbert Report would conclude in December 2014, and Colbert would be retiring his conservative character when hosting The Late Show with Stephen Colbert, which premiered on September 8, 2015. Colbert said in advance, before the final week of the show aired, that it would be a special week "like every other week". The final episode was the highest-rated episode of the series ever and was the number one show on cable in its time slot. The final episode received generally positive reception including several tributes and positive reviews from critics.

== Synopsis ==
The episode opens during the ending of that day's episode of The Daily Show, with Jon Stewart checking in with Stephen to "toss over" the show (a discontinued practice used earlier in the series run). Colbert does not directly acknowledge it being the final episode, but he quickly has Jimmy start The Colbert Report, abruptly ending The Daily Show without closing credits or a Moment of Zen. He starts the show with a quip: "If this is your first time tuning into The Colbert Report, I have some terrible news."

The first segment begins with a news story about a truck from Mark I Plumbing being used as an anti-aircraft gun in Syria. Colbert continues by announcing the winners of the auction for his desk and fireplace set from the show's one-on-one interview area, which collectively accumulated a total of $313,420 for the Yellow Ribbon Fund and DonorsChoose. He then starts the final installment of "The Wørd" segment with "Same to You, Pal", including a series of clips features memorable moments and ventures done by Stephen over the past nine years.

After returning from a commercial break, Stephen begins the final installment of "Cheating Death with Dr. Stephen T. Colbert, D.F.A." The opening of the segment deviates right away when "Grimmy" tries to kill Stephen after watching him cheat in their chess match. Colbert draws his pistol Sweetness and kills "Grimmy" on the spot, throwing his pistol into the crowd with a fan getting it, leaving him without a guest and making him immortal. Returning from another commercial break, Stephen explains he was going to say goodbye before ending the series, but now that he has become immortal, he realizes it would be meaningless and begins singing the song "We'll Meet Again." Soon after, he is immediately joined by Jon Stewart; as the song proceeds, the studio continues to fill rapidly with several recognizable figures who have been involved in the show throughout its run.

After the song ends, the studio is now empty, with a painting without Stephen Colbert, and Stephen is on the roof of the studio questioning what he should do now. Santa Claus' sleigh suddenly lands in front of him; Santa is accompanied by a unicorn-hybrid Abraham Lincoln, and Alex Trebek, "the man with all the answers". Stephen agrees to join them, but worries that this means he will be gone forever. Trebek assures Stephen that they will always be there for the American people when they need them the most.

The episode ends with Colbert thanking everyone involved in the show throughout the run, and he calls upon Mavis Staples to help do so. Signing off with the words, "From Eternity, I'm Stephen Colbert," he then throws the show back to Jon Stewart, paying homage to his character's beginnings on The Daily Show and hinting that the entire series was just a nine-year-long correspondent segment. Jon thanks Stephen for the report and introduces the Moment of Zen, which is a previously unaired clip of Stewart checking in with Colbert from June 3, 2010. After being told that the said footage will not be used on air, Stewart says, "let's go back into our funny characters ... Stephen, what are you doing?" To which Colbert mockingly replies, "Hi Jon, I'm getting angry at liberals". The show's closing credits were played with the song "Holland, 1945" by Neutral Milk Hotel instead of the usual theme; Colbert picked the song in honor of his father and two brothers, who died in a plane crash.

== Background ==
In 2012, Comedy Central renewed Jon Stewart's contract to host The Daily Show through the end of 2015 and Stephen Colbert's contract to host The Colbert Report through the end of 2014. Colbert intentionally had his contract synced up with David Letterman's contract to host Late Show with David Letterman on CBS, so they would both expire at the same time; so that in the event Letterman chose to retire Colbert would be available to take over the show. On April 3, 2014, Letterman announced on his show that he would retire in 2015.

One week later on April 10, 2014, it was announced that Colbert was chosen to replace Letterman as the host of Late Show on CBS beginning in 2015. It was also announced that The Colbert Report would conclude at the end of 2014, and that Colbert would not be using his conservative character on Late Show. Comedy Central soon released a statement saying "Comedy Central is proud that the incredibly talented Stephen Colbert has been part of our family for nearly two decades. We look forward to the next eight months of the ground-breaking Colbert Report and wish Stephen the very best".

Following the announcement, on April 23, 2014, Colbert made a special surprise appearance in character on The Daily Show to announce that it has become clear to him that he has "won television" and changed the world, the goal he originally set out to do, and thus no longer feels the need to continue. He expressed interest in taking over Late Show after Letterman retires but couldn't because "they already gave it to some fat guy". In subsequent episodes following the announcement Colbert never directly mentioned moving to CBS (with the exception of a few subtle jokes alluding to it), differentiating the real world Colbert from the character. On July 30, 2014, actor James Franco tried unsuccessfully to get Colbert to break character by mentioning the upcoming show.

The Late Show with Stephen Colbert premiered on September 8, 2015. On January 19, 2015, The Colbert Report was replaced on Comedy Central by The Nightly Show with Larry Wilmore, hosted by Larry Wilmore, a contributor for The Daily Show.

== Production and broadcast ==
When commenting on the final week of The Colbert Report, Colbert stated, "Our last week of shows are going to be really special, just like every other week".

The closing credits offer an apology to Doris Kearns Goodwin (as part of a running gag on the series), and feature the song "Holland, 1945" by Neutral Milk Hotel, as a tribute to Colbert's father and two of his older brothers, Peter and Paul, who were killed in the crash of Eastern Air Lines Flight 212 when he was 10 years old.

The final episode originally aired in the United States on Thursday, December 18, 2014, at 11:30 (EST), where the show has aired throughout the entire run. Earlier that same day, Comedy Central aired an all-day marathon featuring archived episodes from the show's run leading up to the final episode, with a break in the marathon for that night's episode of The Daily Show.

== Cameos ==
During the episode, Colbert sings the 1939 song "We'll Meet Again" in its entirety alongside a large group a recognizable figures, most of which had previously made guest appearances on the show. The group featured celebrities, musicians, political figures, television personalities, film directors, news anchors, journalists, people involved in the military, writers, activists, and other prominent people not in the aforementioned categories. The crowd also featured the staff of the show, members of Colbert's family, and fictional characters. The majority of the crowd assembled inside the studio, while others were pre-taped in advance.

- Jon Stewart, television host, host of The Daily Show
- Randy Newman, musician (on piano)
- Jeff Daniels, actor
- Sam Waterston, actor
- Keith Olbermann, sports and political host and commentator
- David Remnick, journalist
- Tom Brokaw, news anchor
- Katie Couric, journalist
- Charlie Rose, television host
- Ken Burns, documentary film director
- Lil Buck, dancer
- Ric Ocasek, musician
- David Hallberg, ballet dancer
- Trevor Potter, political figure, legal counsel for Colbert Super PAC
- Senator Cory Booker (D-NJ)
- Senator Claire McCaskill (D-MO)
- Bryan Cranston, actor
- Tim Meadows, actor (portrayer of P.K. Winsome) (SNL alumnus)
- Alexi Lalas, soccer player
- Jonathan Batiste, musician (would go on to be Colbert's bandleader on The Late Show)
- Cookie Monster, character from Sesame Street
- Big Bird, character from Sesame Street
- James Franco, actor
- George Saunders, author
- Dean Kamen, entrepreneur
- Toby Keith, musician
- Lesley Stahl, journalist
- Jake Tapper, journalist
- Jeffrey Toobin, lawyer, legal analyst
- Neil DeGrasse Tyson, astrophysicist
- Peter Frampton, musician
- Andy Cohen, television personality
- Christiane Amanpour, journalist
- Gen. Raymond T. Odierno, Army Chief of Staff
- Grover Norquist, political figure
- David Gregory, journalist
- Willie Nelson, musician
- Doris Kearns Goodwin, historian
- Matt Taibbi, journalist
- Bing West, author
- Brian Greene, theoretical physicist
- Mandy Patinkin, actor
- Cyndi Lauper, musician
- Yo-Yo Ma, cellist
- Andrew Young, politician
- Andrew Sullivan, blogger
- Michael Stipe, musician
- Francis Collins, physician-geneticist
- Samantha Power, US Ambassador to the United Nations
- Kareem Abdul-Jabbar, former NBA player
- Barry Manilow, musician
- Mayor Bill de Blasio (D-New York City)
- Jeff Tweedy, musician
- Patrick Stewart, actor
- Stone Phillips, television reporter (first guest)
- Joe Quesada, comic book editor
- Cass Sunstein, legal scholar
- Arianna Huffington, Huffington Post founder
- Garrett Reisman, astronaut
- Jimmy Wales, co-founder of Wikipedia
- Maureen Dowd, columnist
- Richard Clarke, counter-terrorism expert/analyst
- Alan Alda, actor
- George Lucas, film director
- Henry Kissinger, diplomat
- Mark Hamill, actor
- Elijah Wood, actor
- Terry Gross, NPR host
- Norm Ornstein, political scientist
- Jim Cramer, television personality
- Ed Viesturs, corporate speaker
- Shepard Fairey, street artist
- Emily Bazelon, journalist
- David Leonhardt, journalist
- Bo Dietl, former detective
- Mike Huckabee (R-AR), politician, former Governor (Who Made Huckabee?)
- Robert Pinsky, poet
- Gloria Steinem, feminist intellectual
- Del. Eleanor Holmes Norton (D-DC)
- Bob Costas, sportscaster
- Nate Silver, political prognosticator
- Dan Savage, gay rights activist
- Eliot Spitzer (D-NY), politician, former Governor
- Thomas Friedman, journalist
- Mark Cuban, businessman
- Paul Krugman, economist
- Steven Pinker, psychologist
- Jim Martin, Jesuit priest
- Jonathan Alter, journalist
- George Church, geneticist
- Pussy Riot, musicians (taped)
- Vince Gilligan, television creator (taped)
- Bill Clinton, 42nd President of the United States (taped)
- J. J. Abrams, film director (taped)
- American soldiers in Afghanistan (taped)
- Staff members outside of Studio (taped)
- Tek Jansen, The Colbert Report character (animated)
- Esteban Colberto, The Colbert Report character (taped)
- Terry W. Virts, astronaut (taped while exercising on the COLBERT)
- Evelyn Colbert, Colbert's wife
- Madeleine Colbert, Colbert's daughter
- John Colbert, Colbert's son
- Peter Colbert, Colbert's son
- Smaug, character from The Hobbit film series (CGI)
- Alex Trebek, television host

== Reception ==
=== Ratings ===
The episode was watched by 2.481 million viewers on its initial broadcast, making it the most watched episode ever in the show's history. The finale was the most-watched cable program of the night in its time slot, beating The Daily Show, which was seen by 2.032 million viewers.

=== Tributes ===
Chris Hardwick paid tribute to Colbert in that night's episode of @midnight, which aired immediately after this final episode on the same network. Hardwick opened the show by showing a @midnight clip from November 6, 2014, in which Colbert had made a special appearance. In Colbert's honor, Hardwick asked his guests to name the "three most American words they can think of" as the first game.

=== Critical reception ===
Because Colbert had already booked in his slot on The Late Show with Stephen Colbert, the episode's finale blended facetious sentimentality with genuine tribute (such as Colbert's use of Neutral Milk Hotel's "Holland, 1945" in tribute to his late family members, which was admired by critics).

The Guardian wrote, "It was the perfect way to say goodbye, with his narcissistic character riding off into the great beyond, to live forever in the minds and actions of his fans."

== See also ==
- Series finale of The Late Show with Stephen Colbert
