= Stephen Colbert's Americone Dream =

Ben & Jerry's ice cream flavor

Nutritional value per 105 g
- Energy: 280 kcal (1,200 kJ)
- Carbohydrates: 32 g
- Sugars: 24 g
- Dietary fiber: 0 g
- Fat
- Saturated: 10 g
- Trans: 0 g
- Protein: 4 g
Vitamins and minerals
Vitamins	Quantity %DV^{†}
Vitamin A equiv.	10% 90 μg
Vitamin C	0% 0 mg
Minerals	Quantity %DV^{†}
Calcium	12% 150 mg
Iron	4% 0.8 mg
Sodium	4% 95 mg
- Other constituents: Quantity
- Cholesterol: 60 mg
- ^{†}Percentages estimated using US recommendations for adults. Source: Our flavors at Ben & Jerry's

Stephen Colbert's Americone Dream is a Ben & Jerry's ice cream flavor composed of vanilla with fudge-covered waffle cone pieces and a caramel swirl. The ice cream was officially introduced on February 14, 2007, inspired by Stephen Colbert, host of the CBS television show The Late Show, and the fictionalized version of him who served as host of The Colbert Report on Comedy Central. The same flavor became available in Canada as "Oh Cone-ada" in 2010.

Colbert donates the proceeds from the sale of Americone Dream to charity through The Stephen Colbert Americone Dream Fund. The Fund supports charities of concern to Colbert and The Late Show staff, such as food and medical assistance for disadvantaged children, helping veterans and their families, and environmental causes.

== Ice cream ==
Americone Dream is vanilla ice cream with fudge-covered waffle cone pieces and a caramel swirl. Identified by co-founder Ben Cohen as the most patriotic flavor that Ben & Jerry's has ever done, Colbert also says that the flavor is perfect for any federal holiday. The name "Americone Dream" is a pun on the term American Dream.

On February 14, 2014, the seventh anniversary of Americone Dream, the flavor was added to the list of Ben and Jerry’s ice creams that are entirely non-genetically modified. The ice cream also joined the list of products that utilize Fairtrade ingredients, specifically vanilla, sugar and cocoa. “Simply folding Fairtrade ingredients into Stephen’s flavor provides an opportunity for farmers around the globe to reach their own Americone Dreams of prosperity,” said the company co-founder, Jerry Greenfield. In 2021, the company released a vegan non-dairy version of Americone Dream, made with almond milk and dairy-free waffle cones.

== History ==
In the fall of 2006, Colbert got a call from his agent, asking him if he was interested in collaborating with Ben and Jerry's on an ice cream flavor. Colbert agreed, and he got sent three pints, in an unmarked container, of different flavors so he could settle on one. He tried them with his wife and children, and they chose what would become the actual Americone flavor. Although his family had notes, the flavor could not be modified.

On March 5, 2007, Ben and Jerry appeared on The Colbert Report to promote the launch of Americone Dream and Ben's advocacy group, TrueMajority. Colbert had given up sweets for lent, so he had Daniel Boulud, Tim Robbins, and Anderson Cooper try the ice cream for him. In the interview they reveal that Willie Nelson also has an ice cream flavor, named "Country Peach Cobbler". A few days later, Nelson appeared on the show to settle a dispute, provoked by Colbert, over their flavors. That same year, Colbert threw the ceremonial "first pint" to Jerry Greenfield at the Charleston's RiverDogs game. He was also part of the game's live radio broadcast.

In 2011, Jimmy Fallon appeared on The Colbert Report to have a "duel" of their respective Ben & Jerry ice cream flavors. The skit also featured appearances by Jon Stewart of The Daily Show and Ben & Jerry founders Ben Cohen and Jerry Greenfield. The skit ended with Fallon and Colbert singing a duet in peace. On February 2, 2012, Colbert announced that Americone Dream Ice Cream was going to be given away free at Ben and Jerry's Scoop Shops on February 14, 2012, from 5:00 p.m. through 8:00 p.m. Two days later, Colbert appeared on Late Night with Jimmy Fallon in yet another ice cream competition skit written to advertise both flavors. In September, the company announced a re-design of the packaging, in honor of their “Get The Dough out of Politics” campaign, with a new lid which features "Superpack," referring to the "Colbert Super PAC."

Upon the conclusion of The Colbert Report, Ben and Jerry's spokesman, Sean Greenwood, confirmed that the ice cream was staying in circulation as Colbert became host of The Late Show. "The flavor is not going anywhere", Greenwood said. Colbert joined the Ben & Jerry’s Scoop Truck and visited police and fire departments around New York to serve free ice cream.

In 2022, Colbert reported on a "scandal" in which an ice cream with the same flavor profile was being sold under the name "Oh Cone-ada" in Canadian stores. This news came despite the fact that Jimmy Fallon's flavor "The Tonight Dough avec Jimmy Fallon" remained in Canadian grocery store aisles with only the change of "with" to "avec." At the conclusion of the segment, Colbert challenged his fans to buy "Americone Dream," eat it in its entirety, and then mail the empty container to anyone in Canada.

== The Stephen Colbert Americone Dream Fund ==
When Colbert first got the news of the ice cream being developed, he knew he wanted its proceeds to go to charity. In 2007, he set up The Stephen Colbert Americone Dream Fund, through which he donates a 100% of the profits. He partnered with the Coastal Community Foundation, which previously managed the Colbert Family Fund, "We had a family fund before that, but I said let's earmark all of my proceeds for that fund and rename it the AmeriCone Dream Fund and keep it that way." Colbert has said. The fund's first donation, went to the families of the firefighters who were killed in the Charleston Sofa Super Store fire. When Colbert broke his wrist in 2007 he began selling $5 yellow, rubber “Wriststrong” bracelets, proceeds went to the Yellow Ribbon Fund, which assists injured service members. The show raised $171,000 in a few months. Proceeds from “AmeriCone Dream,” had brought the total to $350,000 for the organization. In 2008 and 2009, the fund raised $158,513 and $143,669 from sales, respectively. On September 13, 2010, the nonprofit organization VolunteerMatch challenged Colbert to an on-air "Ice Cream Taste-Off" between AmeriCone Dream and another Ben & Jerry's ice cream flavor, Berry Voluntary.

In 2017, Colbert announced on the Late Show that he would pledge $1000 through his Americone Dream Fund for every pubescent celebrity photo Instagrammed or Tweeted under #PuertoRicoRelief or #PuberMe hashtags. Every year, before the Christmas break, Colbert has a reunion with his show's staff, where he lets each person choose a charity to donate to, during rehearsal he reads out every charity, and the amount that its donated to each of them. He has described it as "his favorite night of the year". By 2014, the fund had raised more than $1 million for charitable purposes, and by 2022, the amount had grown to $4 million.

== Reception ==
Since its release, Americone Dream usually features in the top 10 Ben and Jerry's flavors. In 2014, spokesman Sean Greenwood said, "It has been featured in an elite category—one of only three flavors that has been featured in Scoop Shops... quarts, pints, and mini cups, it has ascended breaking the crème-de-glace ceiling of top 10 flavors at Ben & Jerry’s."

On September 22, 2013, Americone Dream appeared in the Breaking Bad episode "Granite State". On July 22, 2014, Daniel Radcliffe announced Americone Dream as his favorite post-coital food. On January 21, 2019, Colbert and his Late Show guest Rep. Alexandria Ocasio-Cortez ate Americone Dream together after showing Ocasio-Cortez's Instagram post of her eating Americone Dream ice cream at the end of a long and tiring day in Congress.
