= Erik Frandsen (musician) =

American actor and singer-songwriter

Erik Frandsen is an American actor, guitarist, and singer-songwriter who is associated with the Greenwich Village folk scene.

== Career ==
=== Music ===
Erik Frandsen started his career in the mid-sixties as a songwriter and session player in and around the Greenwich Village folk scene.

In the seventies, he collaborated with the National Geographic label on the philological rendition of a collection of songs from the Civil War era, resulting in the albums "Songs Of The Civil Wars" (1976) and "Songs Of Rebels And Redcoats" (1976) and took part into the recording sessions of Bob Dylan's album Desire. In 1991, Frandsen co-composed the score for the 1991 off-Broadway musical Song of Singapore. He was nominated for and won several awards for the show

Because of his extensive knowledge of Village folk scene and the many years he spent touring with various folksingers, Pat Sky and Dave Van Ronk especially, he was involved in the making of the film Inside Llewyn Davis by the Coen Brothers, which is loosely based on the figure of Van Ronk, and helped actor Oscar Isaac to learn Van Ronk's fingerpicking style.

=== TV ===
Later in life, Frandsen picked up acting and played in Law & Order franchise episodes, and also played a recurring character at The Colbert Report, the fictional German ambassador to the UN Hans Beinholtz. In 2013, Frandsen voiced Andy Moon in Grand Theft Auto V. He also played the Political Expert in The Onion's "Tea party quiet... Too quiet".

== Awards ==
On May 31, 2015, Frandsen was inducted into the New York Blues Hall of Fame.
