= The Colbert Report =

American late-night talk show (2005–2014)

- Genre: Comedy; News satire; Talk show
- Created by: Stephen Colbert; Ben Karlin; Jon Stewart
- Directed by: Jim Hoskinson
- Presented by: Stephen Colbert
- Opening theme: "Baby Mumbles" by Cheap Trick
- Country of origin: United States
- Original language: English
- No. of seasons: 9
- No. of episodes: 1,447 (list of episodes)

Production
- Executive producers: Jon Stewart; Tom Purcell; Stephen Colbert
- Producer: Emily Gasperak
- Production location: New York, New York
- Running time: 22 minutes
- Production companies: Spartina Productions; Busboy Productions; Comedy Partners

Original release
- Network: Comedy Central
- Release: October 17, 2005 – December 18, 2014

Related
- The Daily Show; The Late Show with Stephen Colbert; Our Cartoon President; Tooning Out the News

The Colbert Report (/koʊlˈbɛər rɪˌpɔːr/ kohl-BAIR rih-por) is an American late-night talk and news satire television program hosted by Stephen Colbert that aired four days a week on Comedy Central from October 17, 2005, to December 18, 2014, for 1,447 episodes. The show focused on a fictional anchorman character named Stephen Colbert, played by his real-life namesake. The character, described by Colbert as a "well-intentioned, poorly informed, high-status idiot", is a caricature of televised political pundits. The show also satirized conservative personality-driven political talk programs, particularly Fox News's The O'Reilly Factor. The Colbert Report is a spin-off of Comedy Central's The Daily Show, where Colbert was a correspondent from 1997 to 2005.

The program, created by Colbert, Jon Stewart, and Ben Karlin, lampooned current events and American political happenings. The show's structure consisted of an introductory monologue and a guest interview, in which the Colbert character attempts to deconstruct his opponent's argument. The show was taped in New York City's Hell's Kitchen neighborhood, and the program's set is "hyper-American", epitomizing the character's ego. The show was taped and broadcast Monday through Thursday, with weeks taken off at multiple points in a given year for breaks.

The Colbert Report saw immediate critical and ratings successes, leading to various awards, including multiple Emmy and Peabody Awards. The show's cultural influence often extended beyond the show's traditional viewing audience, including Colbert running for U.S. President twice, co-hosting a rally at the National Mall, presenting a controversial performance at the White House Correspondents' Dinner, and establishing a real Super PAC that raised over a million dollars. The show also inspired various forms of multimedia, including music and multiple best-selling books.

== Background ==
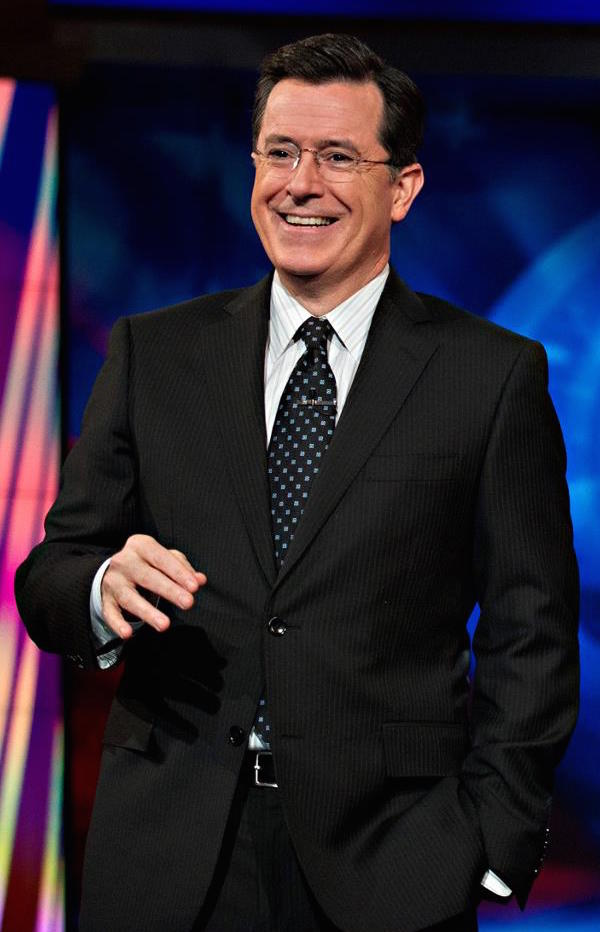
Colbert on the set of The Colbert Report in 2011

The Colbert Report, hosted by a fictional anchorman character named Stephen Colbert, played by his real-life namesake, satirized conservative personality-driven political pundit programs like The O'Reilly Factor and Hannity on Fox News. The character first made appearances on the short-lived sketch comedy series The Dana Carvey Show in 1996, described as "a self-important, trench-coated reporter who does on-location stories in a way that suggests his own presence is the real scoop." His skits included "Waiters Who Are Nauseated by Food", and "Skinheads from Maine".

Colbert joined The Daily Show in 1997, a year following its launch, then hosted by Craig Kilborn. When Jon Stewart became the program's host in 1999, The Daily Show developed a markedly different style, bringing a sharper political focus to the humor than the show previously exhibited. Colbert recalled that Stewart specifically asked him to have a political viewpoint, and to allow his passion for issues to carry through into his comedy.

Colbert became a fixture on The Daily Show, occasionally hosting in Stewart's absence. In 2003, the program began running advertisements for a fictional program titled The Colbert Réport, starring Colbert as a parody of cable news pundits. When fellow Daily Show star Steve Carell left the show to pursue a film and television career, Comedy Central worked to keep Colbert at the network. Colbert pitched The Colbert Report to the channel in 2004. Stewart pushed Comedy Central to pick up the show, and Colbert was given an eight-week tryout. Following the show's immediate success, the show "quickly became a fixture in the late-night lineup." At its peak, the show averaged 1.5 million viewers each evening. The high viewership led the show to win multiple Emmy Awards, including Outstanding Variety Series in 2013 and 2014 followed by Outstanding Picture Editing for Variety Programming in 2015 even after Stephen Colbert had left the show.

The intensity of the fictional Colbert anchorman character was gradually toned down over the course of the show's run, as the host believed he would eventually need to move beyond it. He began to regard it as an act of discipline to perform as the character, later remarking, "to model behavior, you have to consume that behavior on a regular basis. It became very hard to watch punditry of any kind, of whatever political stripe." In 2010, Colbert testified in character before Congress on the issue of immigrant farm labor, drawing both praise and criticism for blending comedy and political activism. With his contract set to end in December 2014, he had already decided to leave the show when he was contacted by CBS to replace David Letterman as the host of The Late Show franchise. The show's ending was announced concurrently with Colbert's jump to CBS in April 2014. The last episode of the Report aired on December 18, 2014. The show was replaced on Comedy Central's late-night lineup by The Nightly Show with Larry Wilmore, another spinoff of The Daily Show.

The Colbert Report made a one-off return during a segment of The Late Show with Stephen Colbert on September 19, 2025, with "The Word" segment: "Shhhhhh..." in the context of the indefinite suspension of Jimmy Kimmel Live! by ABC.

== History ==
=== Development ===
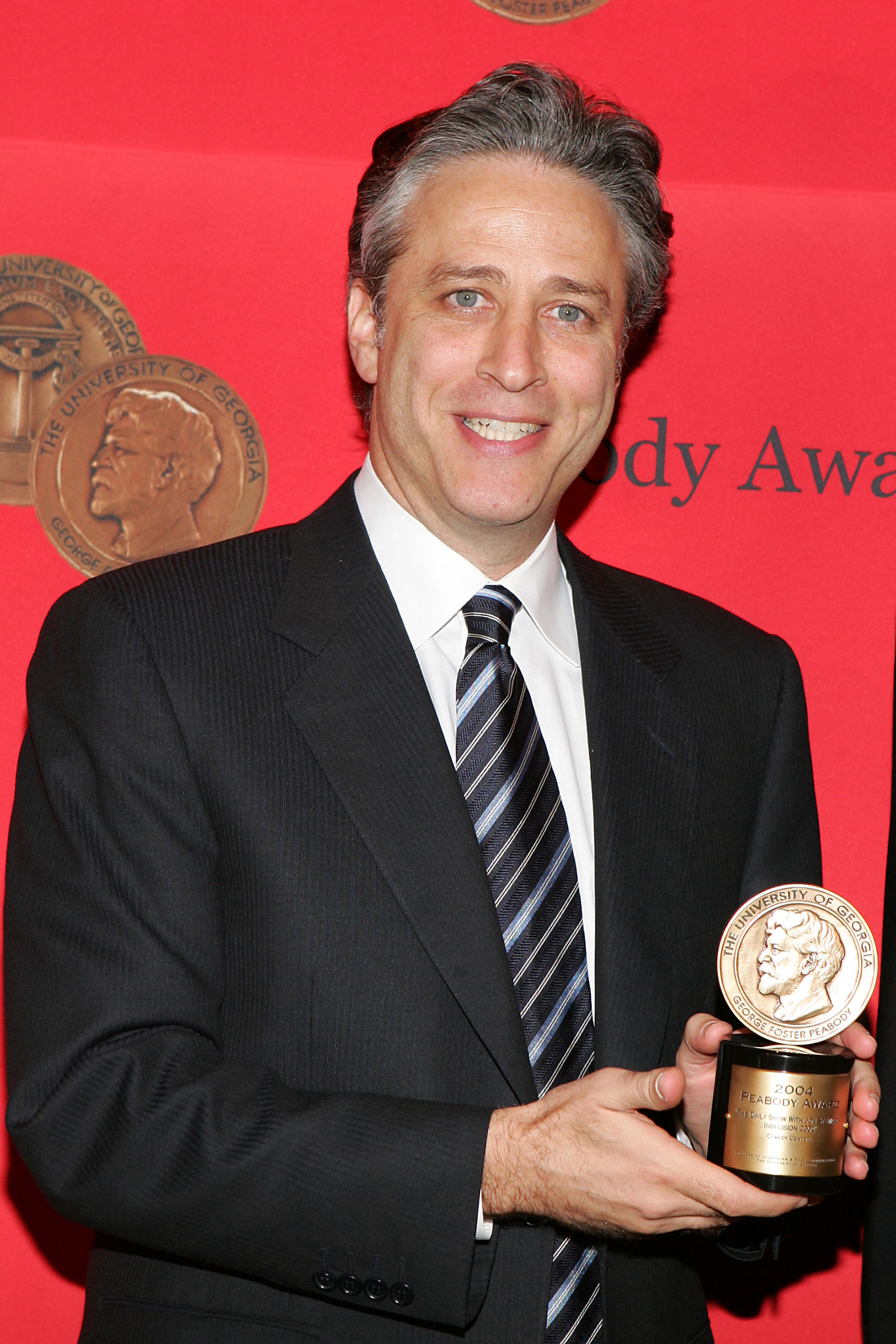
The show is a spin-off of The Daily Show, hosted by Jon Stewart, seen here in 2005.

The character first made appearances on the short-lived sketch comedy series The Dana Carvey Show in 1996, described as "a self-important, trench-coated reporter who does on-location stories in a way that suggests his own presence is the real scoop."

When The Daily Show ran short on time, a short piece starring Colbert, advertising a fictional program titled The Colbert Réport, was added into the program. In these sketches, Colbert began to amplify his character to parody news pundits. Colbert anchored many sketches in his persona, including "Even Stepvhen", in which he debated current issues with fellow correspondent Steve Carell, often devolving into petty name-calling and insults. Colbert and Carell were viewed as potential breakout stars by staff, and when Carell left the series in 2004 to start an American version of The Office, Comedy Central made attempts to keep Colbert at the network. Stewart and Karlin were already looking to expand the Daily Show franchise and their production company, Busboy. The duo supposedly came up with the idea for The Colbert Report after watching coverage of the sexual harassment lawsuit filed against Bill O'Reilly. Colbert met with network president Doug Herzog the day following the 2004 Emmy Awards to first discuss the concept. The one-line pitch Colbert, Karlin and Stewart developed was "Our version of the O'Reilly Factor with Stephen Colbert." Herzog committed to an eight-week tryout period without a pilot.

By the time of the 2004 election, the character was fully developed. In creating the character, which is designed to be repellent but entertaining, Colbert conferred with Stewart and Karlin. In expressing his hope that his character not be "an asshole," Stewart remarked, "You're not an asshole. You're an idiot. There's a difference." Head writer Allison Silverman reiterated this trait in a later interview, commenting, "There is an essential innocence to his character." Colbert initially felt the character might not be sustainable in a longer format. Despite this, The Colbert Report was designed as an extension of the satiric goals of The Daily Show, combining it with general silliness and character-driven humor. To make sure there was no overlap in subject matter with The Daily Show, Karlin made trips between the studios during the show's early days to supervise scripts. For the first several years of the program, Colbert made an appearance at the end of each Daily Show in split-screen, having a short discussion with Stewart preceding his show.

=== Production ===
I call the show, jokingly, "The Joy Machine", because if you can do it with joy, even in the simplest show, then it's "The Joy Machine" as opposed to "The Machine". Considering the speed at which we do it, we'll get caught in the gears really quickly unless we also approach it with joy.

— Stephen Colbert describing the show's production, 2009

The show's writing was grounded in improv, employing a "yes to everything" mentality. Much of the humor derived from extended improv games with the show's studio and at-home audience, like Colbert's poll to name a bridge in Hungary after himself. Many of the writers had improv training and at one point put together "improv evenings" at the Upright Citizens Brigade Theatre once a month. The Report's writing staff was predominantly male and white; Colbert acknowledged this lack of diversity, but contended that he hired writers based solely on the quality of their material and had never looked at the names on writing packets submitted for employment. Subjects considered too dark were not even considered for comedic material; for example, the show would poke fun at press coverage of a tragedy, rather than the tragedy itself. Issues discussed on the show were later reported on actual newscasts, in turn allowing the show to comment on its own impact, creating an echo chamber of sorts. This led Colbert to describe his show, "at its purest expression, [as] a pebble that we throw into the puddle of the news, and then we report on our own ripples."

Ideas for each show were considered in the morning pitch meeting, which could range from "harrowing" to smooth. Described as having "demanding standards", Colbert is quoted as remarking, "Let's make it perfect and then cut it." Although dozens of ideas were either chosen for the show or deleted, other ideas, saved for a later date, were often forgotten because of the pace of news. Ideas with considerable potential were put in the "hopper" to be developed and rewritten, while more fully formed ideas were placed in the "pantry." Good jokes would still be sacrificed if they did not fit the character's specific point of view, which was deemed the inverse of what "any logical person" feels. At least one writer has described the job as "all-consuming", leaving no time for outside activities. Colbert himself eventually became withdrawn from morning meetings as the show continued on and he mulled a decision to leave.

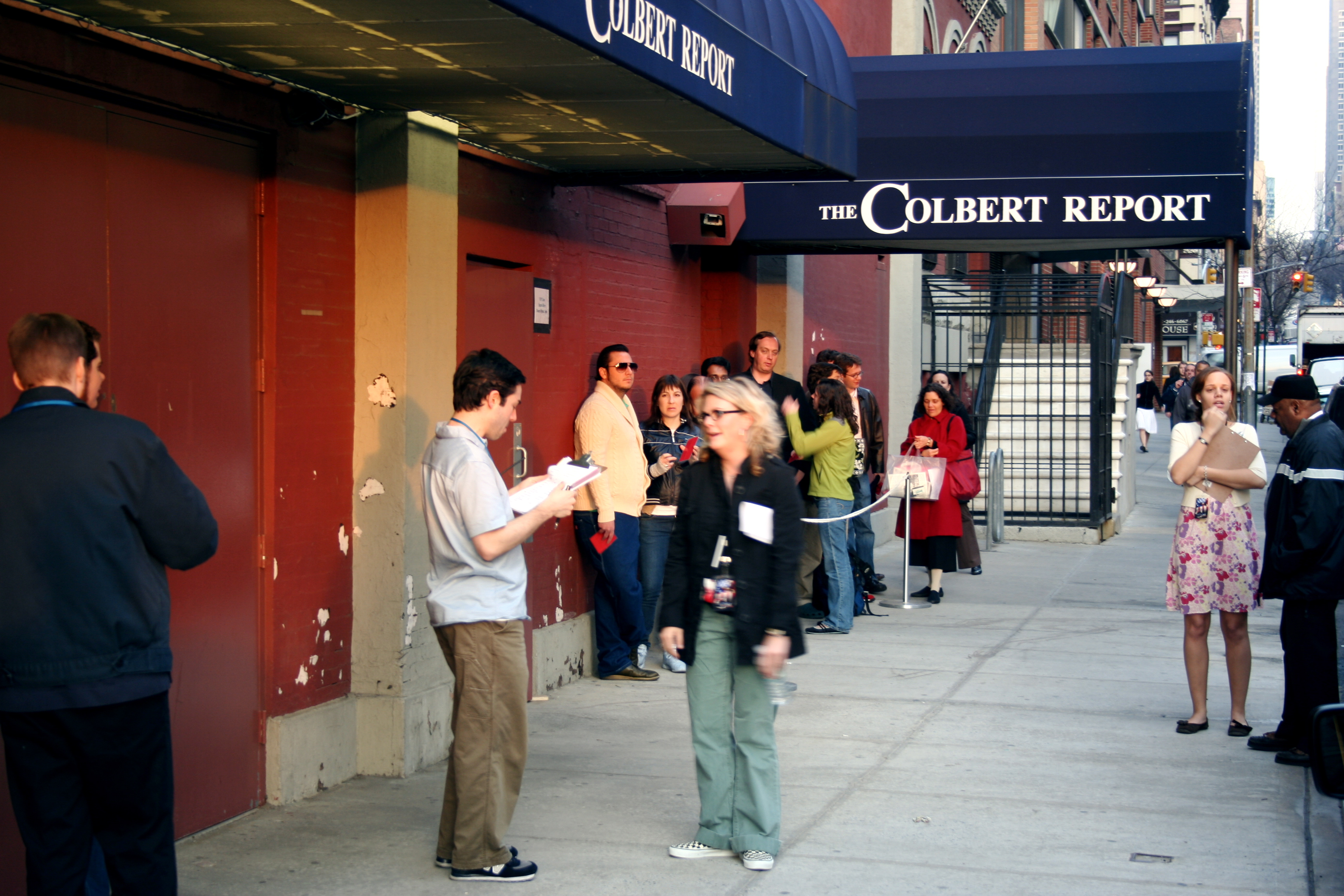
Outside the studio

Usually by 11 a.m., a rough outline for the show was completed and writers sent off in pairs to create scripts that would be polished throughout the day. First, writers would scan news articles for ideas and partner together in pairs, with one "keeping track of possible jokes." During an appearance at the New York Comedy Festival in 2013, some writers admitted to procrastinating until the last hour before rehearsal to complete their sections; Colbert confirmed that, in the program's early days, segments such as "The Word" were scripted entirely during the rewrite before rehearsal. Both writers read their dialogue aloud to see whether they thought the Colbert character would say it. As writers were working on their respective scripts, the show's production and graphics team compiled music, footage, and props needed for the show. To collect video clips, the show cross-referenced transcripts of hours and hours of archived TiVo recordings of news programs. In 2011, the show switched to Snapstream software, which streamlined the TV clip search and compilation process, allowing for searching closed captioning for select words. In addition, a group of staff coders and independent contractors developed Scripto software to collaborate on scripts in real time.

By 1 p.m., the show held a second production meeting to go over scripts and determine which pieces to edit. Scripts were "hopefully" completed around 4 p.m., and a rehearsal with the entire staff would begin at 5:30 p.m. or occasionally earlier. Afterward, final changes were made to the script. The final rewrite would take place in a "small, red, poorly ventilated room" until 6:45 p.m. Before interviewing his guests, Colbert met with them in the green room and acknowledged that he was playing a character, noting that the persona is "willfully ignorant of what you know and care about" and urging the guest to "honestly disabuse me of what you see as my ignorance." Emily Lazar, a producer for the interview segments, advised guests to talk with Colbert as though he were a "harmless drunk at the next bar stool." Guests would typically take their seats around 7 p.m., when a warm-up comedian (perhaps Jared Logan or Paul Mecurio) delivered jokes. Colbert, out of character, held a brief question and answer session with the audience prior to taping. Taping lasted as long as three hours but usually ended around 9 p.m., at which point the show was edited and sent to Comedy Central for broadcast. As the show was being edited, the staff met one last time to work through details for the next show.

=== Set ===
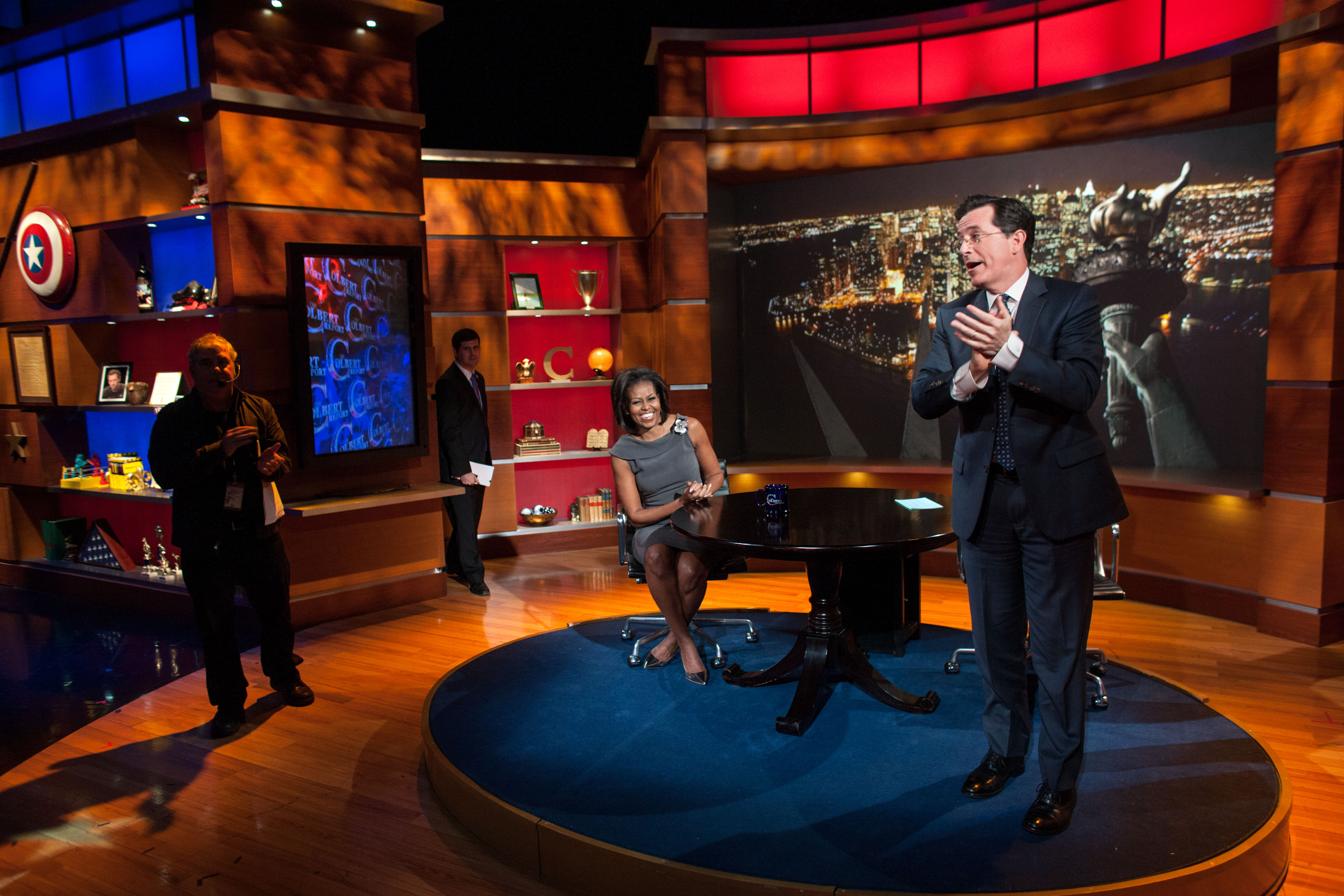
Colbert on the show's set, preparing to interview First Lady Michelle Obama in 2012

The Colbert Report was taped and broadcast four nights a week, Monday–Thursday. The show's taping studio, at 513 W. 54th Street in New York City's Hell's Kitchen neighborhood, was used for The Daily Show until July 2005, and has a capacity of 150. NEP Studio 54 on 54th Street is owned by NEP Broadcasting which is New York City's largest production facility and also owns The Daily Show set at NEP Studio 52 two blocks south on 52nd Street. Aside from the set, the show's production offices have been described as "loft-like" and "all overhead pipes and exposed brick." Following the show's conclusion, the building was used for The Nightly Show with Larry Wilmore.

The set for The Colbert Report was called "The Eagle's Nest" and reflects and facilitates Colbert's self-aggrandizing style. It was designed by Jim Fenhagen, and was intended to both capture the character's ego and be "hyper-American." Elements incorporated into the set included architectural lines converged to Colbert's desk, and radial beams coming out from behind his chair. Colbert's main influence for the set was Leonardo da Vinci's The Last Supper, with the Colbert character as Jesus Christ. In the set, "virtually every inch emblazoned with Colbert's name or the initial C"; his name, initials and the name of the show appear on the desk's plasma screen, on the rafters above the desk, and the desk itself is shaped like a giant "C". The background includes faux artifacts from the character's backstory, which are seldom seen by viewers. "I kept saying, 'People might not really notice this.' But when you're working with a comedy team, they really get into it. They couldn't help themselves," said Fenhagen. These references included the United States Constitution, a miniature Ten Commandments, and a CliffsNotes guide to American government.

The set was described as "part Riefenstahlesque homage to the star, part symbologic gallery – where alert viewers are rewarded with snarky jokes at every turn." Above a fireplace is a portrait of Colbert; it originally showed Colbert standing in front of the same mantel with another portrait of himself. On the show's first anniversary, the portrait was replaced by one of Colbert standing in front of the mantel with the first portrait above it, and with each successive year, it became Colbert standing in front of the previous year's painting. The graphics used throughout the show and the studio itself are saturated with American flags, bald eagles, Captain America's shield, and other patriotic imagery.

== Format ==
Typically, Colbert starts with the audience cheering and teasers regarding the show's topics and guest; each headline is structured to be a deliberate pun. The series of puns are followed by a verbal metaphor that promotes the show and is almost always finished with, "This is the Colbert Report." The show's original opening title sequence began with an eagle diving past the host, following by images of Americana, stock footage of Colbert, and words describing Colbert flying by (some of which have been used as The Word). The first word used was "Grippy", and has changed to include, among others, "Megamerican", "Lincolnish", "Superstantial", "Flagaphile", and "Factose Intolerant". The May 4 episode in 2009 featured hints planted by J. J. Abrams about when and where Colbert would be in the Persian Gulf, and "Farewellison" for the final episode of former producer Allison Silverman. The show's opening credits depict the Colbert character clutching an American flag. On January 4, 2010, a new opening debuted. The opening begins and ends with an eagle as before, but features new background renderings, new shots of Stephen Colbert, and is now colored in an American, red white and blue motif. The show's theme music is "Baby Mumbles" by Cheap Trick. Colbert phoned guitarist Rick Nielsen during development of the show to discuss the theme, noting that he loved the band's song "I Want You to Want Me"; the show's theme music is largely that song's melody backwards.

Following the opening sequence, Colbert most often proceeds with a run-through of recent headlines in a manner parodying traditional news broadcasts, similar to The Daily Show but with a faux-right-wing spin. The program typically continues with Colbert addressing a specific topic. Colbert often calls to "Jimmy", a reference to program director Jim Hoskinson, to roll video clips. That topic will often lead into a "The Word" segment, which juxtaposes Colbert's commentary with satirical bullet points on-screen, a parody of The O'Reilly Factor's "Talking Points Memo". On occasion he will conduct a short interview with someone having to do with the topic. The format of the middle segment varies, but it is normally a visual presentation or skit. Often, these skits are parts of recurring segments, which may include "Better Know a District", in which Colbert interviews a U.S. Representative from a certain district of the United States; "Tip of the Hat/Wag of the Finger", in which Colbert voices his approval or disapproval of prominent people and news items; "Cheating Death with Dr. Stephen T. Colbert, D.F.A.", a health segment; "The Sport Report" with the "t" in both Sport and Report silent, a sports segment; and "The ThreatDown", in which Colbert lists the five greatest threats to America, and others. His newest segment, "Thought for Food" deals with the consumption of specific foods across the world.

Sometimes, there is a "Colbert Report Special Repor-t" (the final 't' pronounced with special emphasis), or even a "Colbert Report, Sport Report, Special Repor-t", in which Colbert devotes a section of an episode, and sometimes the entire episode to a special subject. The third segment is almost always an interview with a celebrity guest, often an author or government official. Unlike the late night talk show standard of the guest walking out to the host's desk, Colbert instead runs to a separate area of the set to interview his guest, basking in the applause and glory meant for the guest. On the interview segment of the show, Colbert frequently attempts to nail his guest by using various rhetorical devices and fallacies to prove them wrong. The real-life Colbert once remarked that his personal favorite segment of the program were the interviews, which involved more listening on his end in order for the character to "ignorantly deconstruct" his opponent's argument. Frequent guest Father James Martin was known as The Colbert Report's chaplain. The third segment of the show is on occasion a musical guest. Prominent musical guests have included Metallica, Paul McCartney, Rush, Green Day, Paul Simon, Crosby Stills & Nash, Pavement, Cat Stevens, Yo-Yo Ma, Radiohead and Black Star. Afterwards, Colbert ends the show with parting words to the audience or, if short for time, a simple "that's it for the report everybody, good night".

== Character ==
It's all about this [character] because there's a culture of victimization of these hosts. They feel like they're the ones who are the story, and they are being attacked by the powers that be or by some nefarious cabal. That's all based upon one person. That's how it came about, just me and the camera.

— Colbert on the character

The host of The Colbert Report is Stephen Colbert, a "self-important right-wing commentator", portrayed by his real-life namesake. The character incorporates aspects of Colbert's real life, but primarily parodies cable news pundits, particularly Bill O'Reilly of Fox News' The O'Reilly Factor, whom he refers to as "Papa Bear". To this end, the character even incorporates O'Reilly's mannerisms, described as his "pen-wielding, hand-stabbing gestures." O'Reilly's use of "talking points"—illustrated onscreen text reflecting the host's opinions—are parodied on The Colbert Report with the segment "The Word". He initially incorporated long-winded, verbose metaphors to parody CNN correspondent Aaron Brown. In addition, the character was also heavily inspired by Stone Phillips, Bill Kurtis and "especially" Geraldo Rivera. "I loved the way Geraldo made reporting a story seem like an act of courage," Colbert told a reporter in 2012.

The core principle of The Colbert Report is that Colbert is a "well-intentioned, poorly informed, high-status idiot." The character believes that he himself is the news: rather than a vessel to deliver the news to the audience, or a general member of the media, the character sees himself as more important than the news. He is veracious in his approach, while often ridiculously overblown in his statements. The character is egomaniacal, fact-averse ("factose intolerant"), God-fearing, and hyper-patriotic. He claims to be an independent who is often mistaken for a Republican, but uniformly despises liberals and generally agrees with the actions and decisions of the Republican Party. Colbert's character has been described as a "caustic right-wing bully." The character exists not in opposition to political leaders, but to common ignorances; for example, his insistence that then-presidential candidate Barack Obama had Socialist leanings was based on public misconceptions. In parodying the cult of personality, the Colbert character also developed a real-life equivalent, creating what was dubbed the "Colbert Nation". While giving the character a certain mythos was part of the show's inception, show producers did not set out to create a loyal following for the character itself; the joke was that the character thought he had an influence, but that was a figment of his ego-riddled imagination.

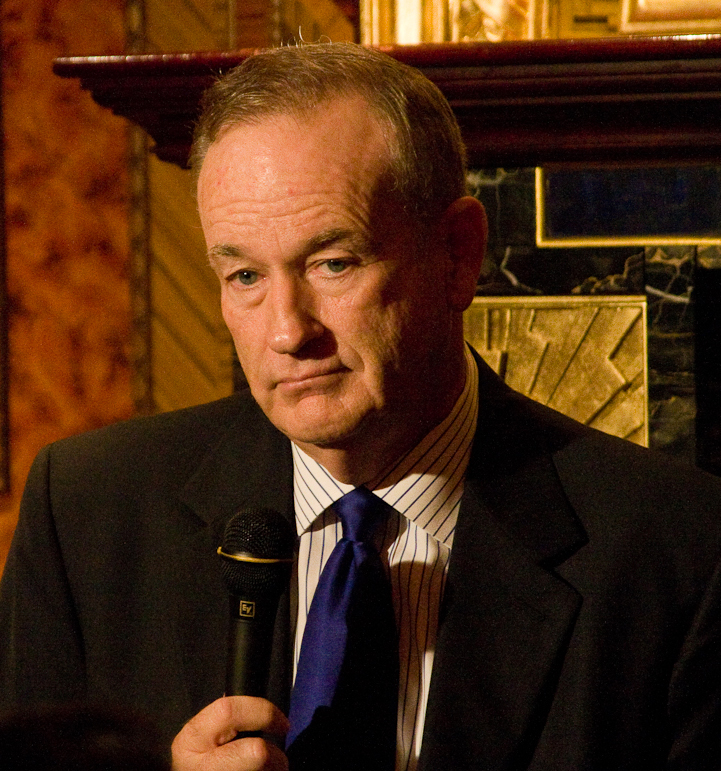
The character is primarily a parody of cable news pundits, particularly Bill O'Reilly, pictured above.

Despite his appearance of always being in charge, Colbert is vulnerable: he feels deeply threatened by those wielding more power than he, and he suffers from "arctophobia", the fear of bears, which he refers to as "giant, marauding, godless killing machines". He will alert the audience to what he perceives as the latest national threat (the subject of a recurring bit, "ThreatDown"), only to justify his own fears and impose those onto his audience.

As the show progressed, Colbert gradually began to tone down the character, allowing guests in interviews to "get his or her own message across." The show's longevity created what The New York Times described as "a winking quality to the act, a sense that we're all in on the joke." Colbert himself acknowledged that he "rarely hit it as hard as I used to," noting that "You have to be vigilant to stay ignorant." He noted that his own personal opinions can occasionally align with his character's, when liberal guests' agendas appeared based on dislike rather than logical argument. Politician and former vice president Al Gore accidentally referred to the persona as a "character" in a 2011 interview on the show, and in 2013, Colbert further blurred the lines between his character and real life when he spoke regarding the death of his mother on the program. In doing so, many commentators referred the show's longevity and the development of a "third" Colbert — one a faux pundit and one informed by the performer's own life. In the show's credits, Colbert was credited with a title, which deliberately became increasingly cumbersome as the show progressed: Her Excellency The Rev. Sir Doctor Stephen Tyrone Mos Def Colbert, D.F.A., Heavyweight Champion of the World✱✱ featuring Flo Rida La Premiere Dame De France.

When O'Reilly appeared on The Daily Show before the second episode of The Colbert Report aired, he commented, "Before we get started, somebody told me walking in here, you got some French guy on after you making fun of me?", and made several references in the following interview to 'the French Guy'. In a subsequent Newsweek interview, O'Reilly said that he "feels it's a compliment" to have Colbert parody him because Colbert "isn't mean-spirited" and does not "use [his] platform to injure people". Later, Colbert replied on-air, "I like you too. In fact, if it wasn't for you, this show wouldn't exist."

== Themes ==
Colbert disagreed that the show's emphasis on politics represented a liberal bias, noting that he himself was uninterested in modern politics. He believed that political issues reflect basic human behavior, which he viewed as his satirical specialty, noting, "If I thought I had a political point, I'd be in big trouble." In another interview, Colbert remarked, "I'm not someone with a particular political ax to grind. I'm a comedian. I love hypocrisy."

== Episodes ==
=== Notable episodes ===
==== Early years ====
The Colbert Report premiered on October 17, 2005. The first guest was Stone Phillips, a partial influence on the character. In the debut episode, Colbert coined the word truthiness, defined as "a quality characterizing a 'truth' that a person making an argument or assertion claims to know intuitively 'from the gut' or because it 'feels right' without regard to evidence, logic, intellectual examination, or facts." Truthiness was named the 2005 Word of the Year by the American Dialect Society and for 2006 by Merriam-Webster. The character's forceful nature confused some in the program's early days. During an appearance on the segment "Better Know a District" in the show's first season, a frustrated Barney Frank declined to continue, deeming the conversation too dumb. In one early episode, the Colbert character purported to be a former member of a 1980s new wave group, Stephen & the Colberts, and released a fictional music video from the band for the song "Charlene (I'm Right Behind You)".

The show's popularity resulted in Colbert headlining the 2006 White House Correspondents' Dinner, which he performed in character. The controversial, searing routine targeted President George W. Bush and the media, and was greeted with chilly reception from the audience. Although President Bush shook Colbert's hand after his presentation, several of Bush's aides and supporters walked out during Colbert's speech, and one former aide commented that the President had "that look that he's ready to blow." Colbert's performance quickly became an Internet and media sensation. According to Vanity Fair, the speech transformed Colbert as a "folk hero" for liberals, and was later described by Frank Rich as the "defining moment" of the 2006 midterm elections. Adam Sternbergh of New York, a year after the show's debut, deemed the character "something very close to what he's parodying, a kind of Bill O'Reilly for the angry left."

In 2006, Colbert encouraged fans to vote for his name to be the new name of a bridge in Hungary, which was being decided via an online poll, beating the runner-up by more than 14 million votes. He was, however, disqualified, as the name of the bridge was intended to be a memoriam. Later that year, he began a mock feud with indie rock group the Decemberists over the subject of who was the first to challenge fans to create a green screen video; the fake conflict culminated in a guitar solo competition against Decemberists guitarist Chris Funk on the show's final episode of the year, featuring guest appearances from guitarist Peter Frampton, New York Governor-Elect Eliot Spitzer, and Dr. Henry Kissinger. Colbert later recalled it as the show's "craziest" moment, changing the way the staff viewed the program: "Because you realize the character believes anything he thinks, says, [or] cares about is important, anything fits on the show. [...] That is the show where we said, oh, there is unlimited open field running."

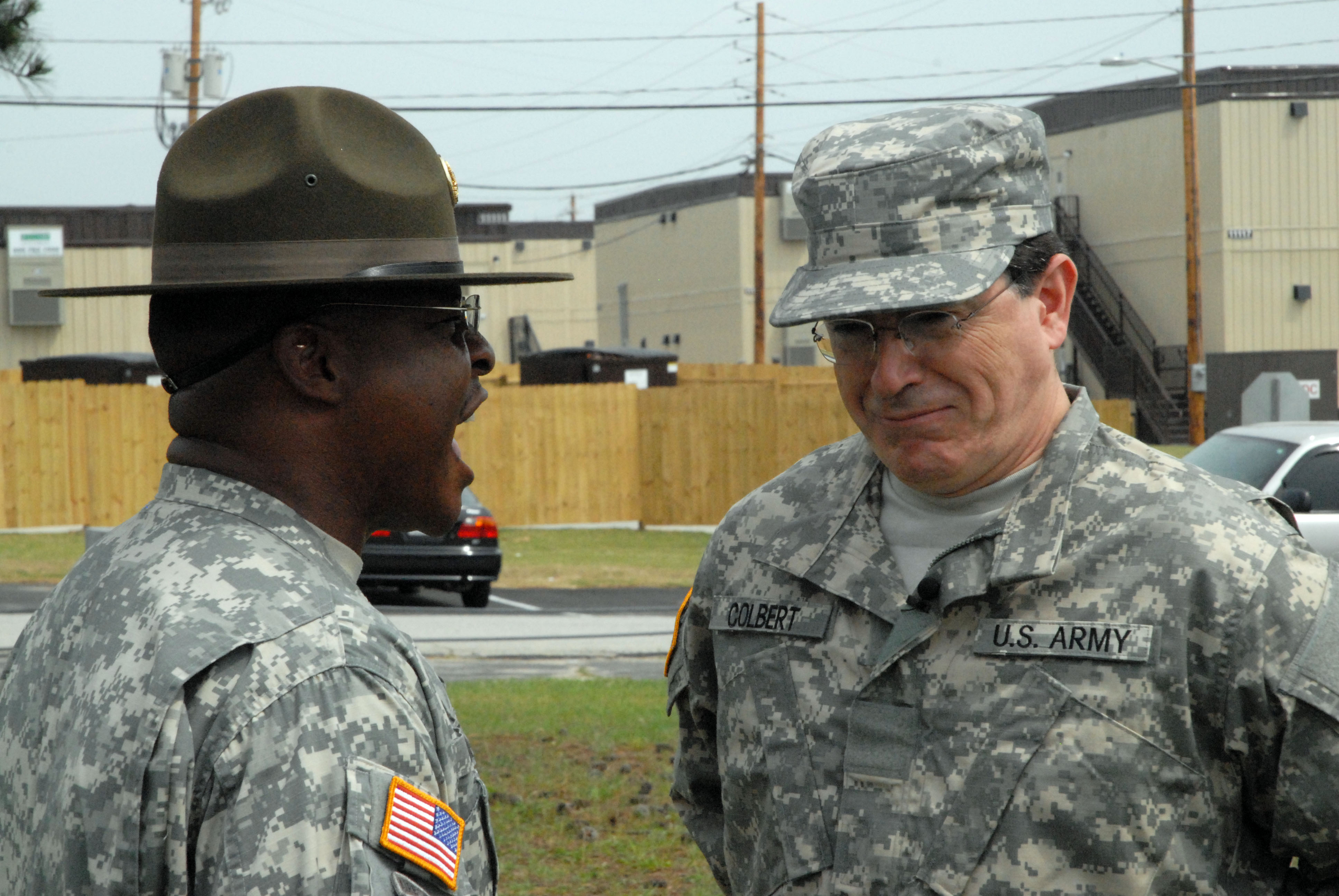
Drill sergeant SFC Chantz correcting PVT Colbert at Fort Jackson

In February 2007, Ben & Jerry's unveiled a new ice cream flavor in honor of Stephen Colbert, named Stephen Colbert's AmeriCone Dream. All proceeds were donated to charity through the Stephen Colbert AmeriCone Dream Fund, which distributed the money to various causes. In June 2007, Colbert broke his left wrist while performing his warm-up for the show. It was the subject of an extended bit on the program, including the creation of the "Wriststrong" wrist band, based on Lance Armstrong's "Livestrong" wrist band, which donated all proceeds to the Yellow Ribbon Fund. Colbert remained on the air without writers during the Writers Guild of America strike in 2007–08. Colbert modified the pronunciation of the show's name, pronouncing both of the formerly elided final "t"s (/ˈkoʊlbərt rəpɔːrt/); a similar move was made by The Daily Show which returned to air as A Daily Show. During this period, he staged a mock feud between himself, Jon Stewart, and Late Night host Conan O'Brien over who made Republican Presidential candidate Mike Huckabee.

In 2008, Colbert made a series of jokes directed at various towns in the United States named "Canton", with many attracting negative responses from each respective area's local government and residents. The same year, the show filmed a tongue-in-cheek Christmas special titled A Colbert Christmas: The Greatest Gift of All!. In 2009, Colbert filmed a series of four episodes for the troops in Baghdad, Iraq. He had a suit tailored for him in the Army Combat Uniform pattern and went through an abbreviated version of the Army's basic training regimen. On the first of the four episodes, Colbert had his head shaved on stage by General Ray Odierno who was jokingly "ordered" to do so by President Barack Obama, who appeared on the episode via a pre-recorded segment from the White House.

==== Later years ====
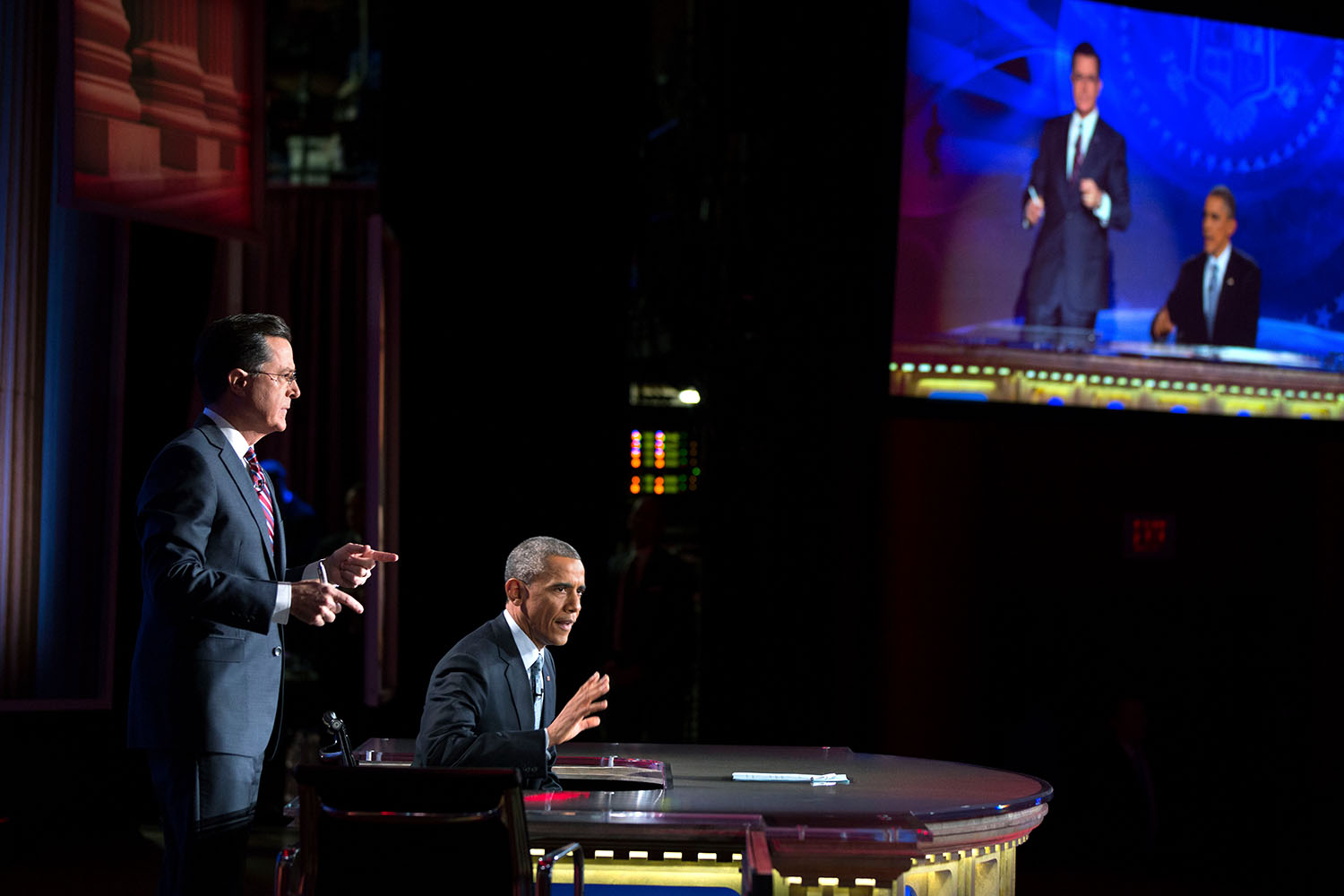
President Barack Obama guest-hosting the show in 2014

In 2010, while in character, Colbert appeared before judiciary subcommittee hearing on the issue of farm workers and immigration. The New Yorker used Colbert's testimony before Congress as an example of the "third" Colbert: "Colbert was thoughtful and sincere—and had ruined the whole thing. By speaking honestly, he had become the very thing he was mocking, a celebrity testifying before Congress." While most representatives were pleased with Colbert's testimony as it brought greater attention to the issue, some such as Representative Steve Cohen, were not amused by Colbert's satirical ingenuity stating that "inviting Colbert was a mistake." Andrew C. Jones, a communications professor at LCC International University in Lithuania, breaks down Colbert's testimony into two separate forms of irony, Socratic irony and Sophistic irony. Furthermore, Jones' article expands on how Colbert's utilization of these types of irony helps viewers process information through a critical lens (Sophistic) and how Colbert compels viewers to "wrestle with the truth" (Socratic).

Beginning in June 2011, the show created a long-running gag that involved Colbert starting his own actual super PAC, Americans for a Better Tomorrow, Tomorrow, described by the character as "100 percent legal and at least 10 percent ethical."

In 2012, Colbert interviewed illustrator/author Maurice Sendak, who managed to get him to break character; show staff and Colbert himself retrospectively labeled the segment one of the show's more memorable moments. The Los Angeles Times called the September 2013 interview with political commentator and former CIA official Philip Mudd Colbert's "most awkward interview", stating Mudd "could barely disguise his contempt" for Colbert.

President Barack Obama guested during the show's final month, in a show taped from George Washington University in Washington, D.C.; Obama sat in Colbert's seat and presided over "The Wørd" segment.

The final episode aired on December 18, 2014. In the episode Stephen becomes immortal after accidentally killing "Grimmy" during the opening of the segment of "Cheating Death with Dr. Stephen T. Colbert, D.F.A.". This leads to Stephen singing "We'll Meet Again" in its entirety along with a large group of famous friends including Jon Stewart, Jeff Daniels, Sam Waterston, Big Bird, Charlie Rose, Terry Gross, Keith Olbermann, Tom Brokaw, Alan Alda, Yo-Yo Ma, Ken Burns, Cyndi Lauper, Patrick Stewart, Randy Newman, Doris Kearns Goodwin, Henry Kissinger, Alex Trebek, Mandy Patinkin, Lesley Stahl, George Lucas, Kareem Abdul-Jabbar, Gloria Steinem, Elijah Wood, Jake Tapper, Bob Costas, Smaug and Cookie Monster.

== Reception ==
=== Critical response ===
==== Initial reviews ====
Reviews of The Colbert Report upon its 2005 premiere were positive, although critics were generally skeptical that the character could extend beyond one season without growing tiresome. While positively reviewing the program as a whole, Maureen Ryan of the Chicago Tribune echoed these sentiments: "The biggest question hanging over The Colbert Report is whether the show's sendup of the pomposity and fear-mongering of cable news blowhards will be as appealing in the long term." Melanie McFarland of the Seattle Post-Intelligencer summarized the show's early reaction: "Critics and bloggers either loved the premiere or declared themselves to be unmoved, but that's the standard reaction after any late-night program's debut. A truer measure will be seen in coming weeks, after the hype wears off and the ratings lose their exuberance."

Gilbert Cruz of Entertainment Weekly noted that "Colbert proves that the line between serious TV journalism and utter nonsense is a very thin one indeed." Heather Havrilesky of Salon was effusive, remarking, "Not only does Colbert maintain his persona without skipping a beat throughout the entire show, but he's got great comic timing, the show's writers are brilliant, and the whole thing is pure foolish, bizarre, idiotic fun." Barry Garron of The Hollywood Reporter dubbed it an "auspicious debut", writing, "The new show dovetails nicely with its lead-in to present a solid hour of skewered news and punctured pomposity." Variety's Brian Lowry commented that the show had an "impressive start with a topnotch premiere followed by a respectable second outing." Paul Brownfield of the Los Angeles Times wrote, "In the run-up to the show it all sounded a bit hard to get your head around, but in the flesh the show zinged, at least this first week."

The Boston Globe's Matthew Gilbert praised the show's wordplay, summarizing, "Colbert's a clever creation, and a necessary one, and he deserves an opportunity to offend as many people as possible with his pompous blather." Alessandra Stanley of The New York Times commented that the show was a welcome addition to the Comedy Central lineup, remarking, "What puts Mr. Colbert over the top is that he is not just impersonating well known television personalities, he also uses parody to score larger points about politics and the press." Nevertheless, there were more negative reviews: USA Today's Robert Bianco opined that the show "tried too hard", writing, "Unfortunately, in just two weeks on the air, this half-hour spoof of a no-spin-zone type show has already stretched Colbert's character and the artifice that supports it past its natural breaking point."

==== Later reviews ====
The New Yorker remarked that the show had remained funny throughout its entire run. The Colbert Report currently scores favorable reviews, with 65/100 on Metacritic (first season), while its viewers' ranking on the site is higher at 8.7/10.

In a 2009 academic analysis of the show's popularity, Temple University researcher, Heather LaMarre found that the show appealed to both liberals and conservatives, concluding, "there was no significant difference between the groups in thinking Colbert was funny, but conservatives were more likely to report that Colbert only pretends to be joking and genuinely meant what he said while liberals were more likely to report that Colbert used satire and was not serious when offering political statements". Canadian journalist Malcolm Gladwell discussed LaMarre's findings in his Revisionist History podcast, "The Satire Paradox" (2016).

=== Ratings ===
The ratings of The Colbert Report, from its premiere, benefited from the lead-in The Daily Show provided, which at the time of the show's debut averaged 1.3 million viewers per night. Comedy Central had previously struggled to produce a hit program on par with The Daily Show, and were counting on Colbert after a string of failures. The Colbert Report drew 1.13 million viewers for its premiere episode, 47 percent greater than the average for that time slot over the previous four weeks, and 98 percent of the viewership of The Daily Show, which had Comedy Central's second-largest viewership. Averaged over its opening week, The Report had 1.2 million viewers per episode, more than double the average for the same time the previous year, when the time slot was occupied by Too Late with Adam Carolla.

The show regularly began attracting over one million viewers with near immediacy. The show also drew more young men, a powerful demographic, than other late-night hosts (at that time, Jay Leno, David Letterman, and Conan O'Brien). Within a year, The Colbert Report began averaging 1.5 million viewers per night. In early 2008, in the midst of the writer's strike, Colbert posted an eleven-percent gain over its averages from the following fall.

From 2012 to 2013, viewership decreased from 1.2 million to 1.1 million. In 2013, The Colbert Report was the second most-watched late-night talk show (behind The Daily Show) among the demographic of adults 18–49, beating competition The Tonight Show with Jay Leno in that demographic for the first time. That year, The Colbert Report attracted $52.1 million in advertising for an audience whose median age was 39.4, about a year younger than The Daily Show. In 2014, the final year of the show's run, ratings were down three percent (coinciding with a general ratings slide for cable television).

The series finale on December 18, 2014, was watched by 2.4 million viewers, making it the most watched episode ever in the show's history. The finale was the most watched cable program of the night in its time slot, beating The Daily Show which was seen by two million viewers.

=== Awards ===
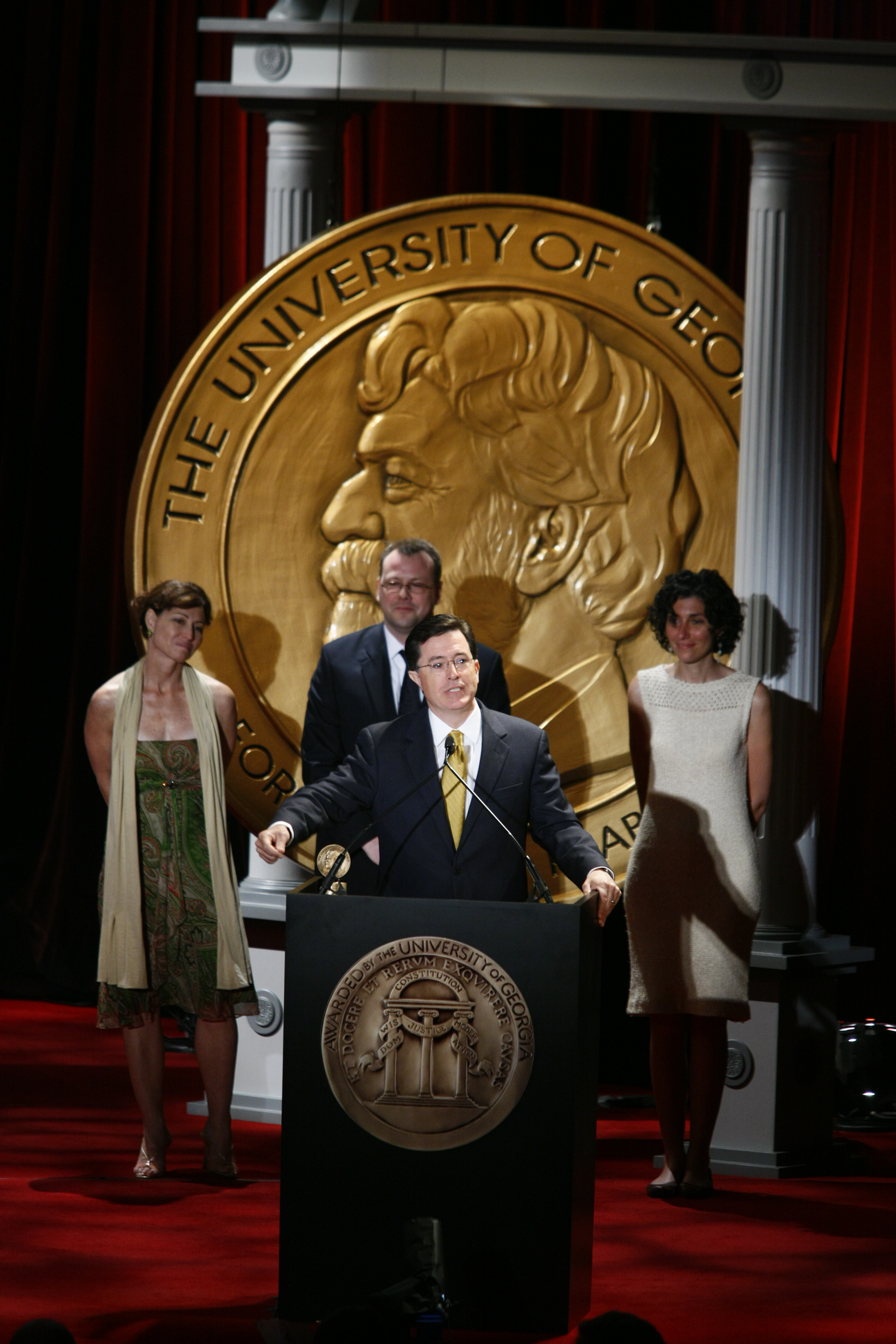
Stephen Colbert and the crew of The Colbert Report at the 67th Annual Peabody Awards

The Colbert Report received numerous awards and accolades throughout its run. The show was nominated for four Emmy Awards in its inaugural year, but lost to The Daily Show. The Report was nominated each year for the rest of its run for Outstanding Variety, Music, or Comedy Series, but lost each time to The Daily Show until 2013— breaking the longest winning streak for a television show in Primetime Emmy Award history. Colbert subsequently referenced his win on his program as the conclusion of Stewart's "reign of terror." The Report also won the award the following year, and received a subsequent nomination in 2015.

The show received two Peabody Awards, recognizing its excellence in news and entertainment. It also won two Grammy Awards, one for Best Comedy Album for the soundtrack to the special A Colbert Christmas, and later for Best Spoken Word Album for the audiobook to America Again. Colbert and Stewart's Rally to Restore Sanity and/or Fear was nominated for four Daytime Emmy awards in 2011, including the Outstanding Special Class Special category and the Outstanding Special Class Writing category.

== Legacy ==
The New Yorker wrote that "Colbert has made vital observations about the American political system, particularly about the sordid role that money plays within it. The Colbert Report and the Daily Show [...] have changed the way that young liberals of a certain class think and talk about civic culture."

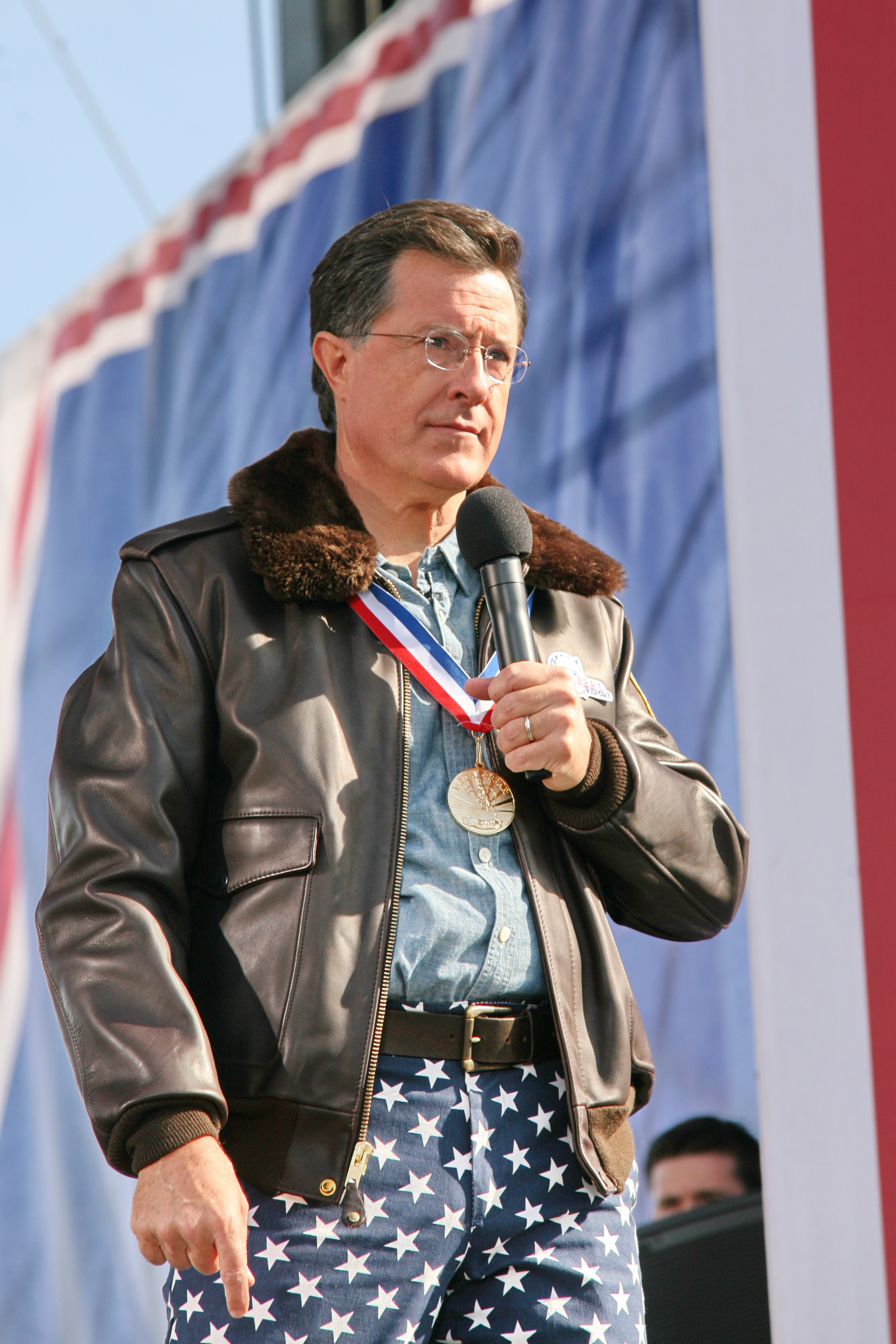
Colbert at the Rally to Restore Sanity and/or Fear in 2010, which attracted over 215,000 people

The show also coined another word, wikiality, that means "reality as decided on majority rule." Viewers of the show also coined a word, freem, based on its inclusion in the show's opening sequence; the word refers to "'freedom' without having to 'do' anything—without any responsibility or action." In response to the "Better Know a District" segment, Rahm Emanuel, then the Democratic Caucus chair, instructed incoming freshmen not to do appearances on the show in 2007. In 2008, East Carolina University associate professor Jason Bond named a species of trapdoor spider Aptostichus stephencolberti in honor of Stephen Colbert.

The "Colbert Bump" is defined, connotatively by the Report, as an increase in popularity of a person (author, musician, politician, etc.) or thing (website, etc.) as a result of appearing as a guest on or (in the case of a thing) being mentioned on the show. For example, if a politician appears on The Colbert Report, they may become more popular with certain voters and thus are more likely to be elected. According to the American Political Science Association, contributions to Democratic politicians rose 40% for 30 days after an appearance on the show. Magazines such as GQ, Newsweek, and Sports Illustrated have all had sales spikes when Colbert appeared on their covers.

Viewers of The Colbert Report were on numerous occasions cited as being more knowledgeable about current events than traditional news viewers. In April 2007, a Pew Research Center report cited both Colbert and The Daily Show viewers as more well-informed than those who gathered their information via newspapers, television news and radio. Colbert's Super PAC coverage was widely lauded, and studies later found that this coverage was more effective than traditional news programs at educating the audience on campaign finance. He was awarded a Peabody Award for the parody, which was described as an "innovative means of teaching American viewers about the landmark court decision". The Annenberg Public Policy Center reported in 2014 that the Colbert Super PAC segments increased viewers' knowledge of PAC and 501(c)(4) campaign finance regulation more successfully than other types of news media.

From 2008 to 2024, official archive clips of the show going back to 2005 were available first on the Colbert Nation website, and then on the Comedy Central website.

== International distribution ==
Outside the United States, The Colbert Report was shown in Canada on the cable service The Comedy Network, simultaneously with its original American broadcast (beginning a few weeks after the series debuted). Episodes would also air in Canada on traditional over-the-air broadcaster CTV, one hour after their appearance on The Comedy Network. On September 22, 2014, due to The Comedy Network's acquisition of Canadian rights to Jimmy Kimmel Live!, the program began airing on M3 and did so for the remainder of the show's run.

It airs on The Comedy Channel in Australia, Comedy Central in New Zealand, and on Maxxx in the Philippines. As of 2012, The Colbert Report has also been broadcast in Africa on DSTV's version of Comedy Central. It aired on FX in the United Kingdom until they decided not to renew their contract in May 2009. In Portugal, it airs on Sic Radical.

Beginning June 3, 2008, The Colbert Report also aired on the ShowComedy channel of Showtime Arabia (Currently OSN First HD), a channel which broadcasts in the Middle East and North Africa. The show is transmitted on a one-day delay from original transmission in the United States.

The show was shown during prime time on Australia's free-to-air ABC2 in 2010, however the channel was outbid for rights for 2011. The show was available directly on the colbernation.com website for part of 2011, with Australian advertisements; however, Australian access is now blocked.

Several international markets also aired The Colbert Report Global Edition, which showed highlights from the previous week's shows and included a special introduction by Stephen Colbert at the start of the program. This meant a new or newly repackaged episode could be screened every weekday.

In addition, most recent episodes (usually 3 weeks back) would be available in full length on colbertnation.com. By the end of the series's run, the colbernation.com website was integrated into Comedy Central's website. As of 2021, almost seven years after the show ended, many episodes were presented in individual clips there.

== Related multimedia ==
The show spawned various merchandise and multimedia related to the show. Three books were released to accompany the show's humor, the first being I Am America (And So Can You!), released both in print and as an audiobook in 2007. In 2012, two spinoff books of the show were released. America Again is a sequel to the show's first book, and addresses topics including Wall Street, campaign finance, energy policy, healthcare, eating on the campaign trail, and the United States Constitution. Another book, I Am a Pole (And So Can You!), was released the same year and purports to be a children's book telling the story of a fictional pole finding its purpose in life.

Segments from the show were also released on DVD during its run. The Best of The Colbert Report, released in 2007, contains several of the show's most memorable early moments. The show's Christmas special, A Colbert Christmas: The Greatest Gift of All!, was also released on DVD the following year. The soundtrack of that special also saw a digital release on the iTunes Store after its broadcast, and contains music from Feist, John Legend, Willie Nelson, Toby Keith, Jon Stewart, Elvis Costello, and Colbert himself. In 2011, Jack White's record label Third Man Records released a 7" vinyl single of Stephen Colbert and The Black Belles performing "Charlene II (I'm Over You)", which they also performed together on the show.

== See also ==
- List of late-night American network TV programs
- The Daily Show
- Tooning Out the News
