= Colbert Super PAC =

American satirical political action committee

Americans for a Better Tomorrow, Tomorrow
- Formation: August 17, 2011
- Dissolved: 2012
- Type: Political action committee
- Registration no.: C00498097
- Legal status: Super PAC
- Region served: United States
- President: Stephen Colbert; Jon Stewart (pro tempore)
- Treasurer: Shauna Polk
- Revenue: $1,248,426 (2011-2012)

The Colbert Super PAC (officially registered as "Americans for a Better Tomorrow, Tomorrow, Inc." and "Colbert Super PAC SHH Institute") was a United States political action committee (PAC) established by Stephen Colbert, who portrayed a character of the same name who was a mock-conservative political pundit on Comedy Central's satirical television series The Colbert Report. As a super PAC the organization could raise unlimited sums of money from corporations, unions and other groups, as well as wealthy individuals. Speaking in character, Colbert said the money would be raised not only for political ads, but also "normal administrative expenses, including but not limited to, luxury hotel stays, private jet travel, and PAC mementos from Saks Fifth Avenue and Neiman Marcus".

Colbert Super PAC reported raising over $1.22 million in their January 2012 filing with the Federal Election Commission. Colbert has been credited with increasing awareness of Super PACs through his late night television show. In April 2012, Colbert received a Peabody Award for his show's series of parody reporting about super PACs as an "innovative means of teaching American viewers about the landmark court decision" (referring to Citizens United v. FEC). On November 12, 2012, Colbert announced his intention to dissolve Colbert Super PAC, citing the death of his fictional advisor Ham Rove. On December 13, 2012, Colbert announced that he was not required to say where the entire balance of the Super PAC's funds ($773,704.83) had gone. Immediately following this, however he stated that a group called "The Ham Rove Memorial Foundation" had received an anonymous donation of $773,704.83, which it would use to support various charities.

== Founding ==
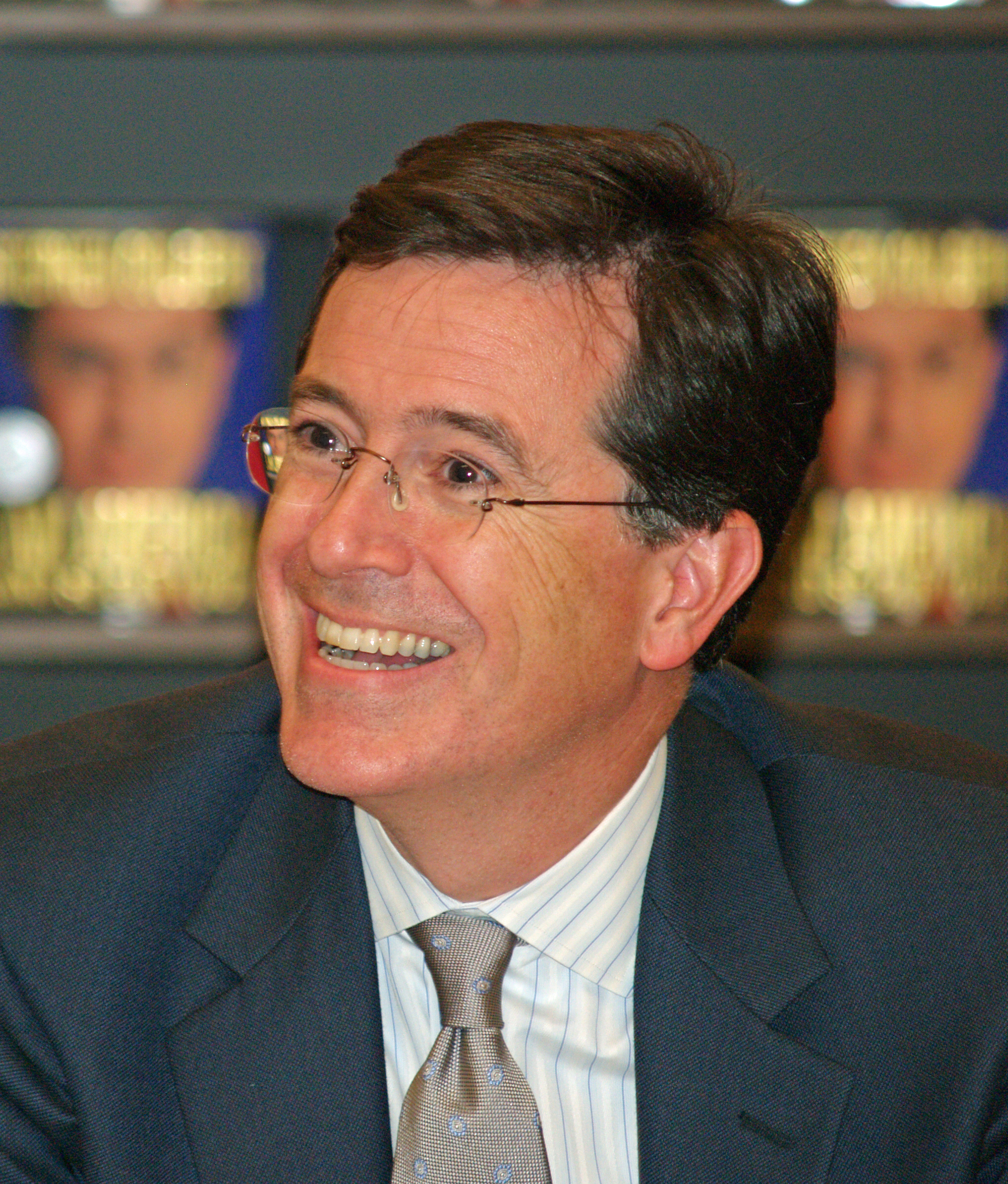
Stephen Colbert at a 2007 book signing

On March 10, 2011, during a Colbert Report segment about 2012 presidential contender Tim Pawlenty's political action committee (PAC), Colbert announced the formation of his own PAC. Parodying a Pawlenty advertisement, Colbert chose to end his ad with a card saying "ColbertPAC", mocking Pawlenty's PAC. In a 2012 interview, Colbert recalled that an executive from Comedy Central then called to ask if he was serious about founding a PAC; "And they said, 'Because if you actually get a PAC, that could be trouble.' And I said, 'Well then, I'm definitely going to do it...' Because I like the idea of, why is it trouble? Everybody can do it, why can't I do it?" Colbert saw the value of this as a way to showcase the impact of the Citizens United v. FEC (2010) decision, in which the Supreme Court held that corporations have free-speech rights to spend unlimited amounts of money in support of political candidates, including political advertising.

On March 30, Colbert hosted former Federal Election Commission (FEC) Chairman Trevor Potter on the program to help him fill out the paperwork for the PAC. On April 14, Colbert revealed that Viacom, which owned Comedy Central, sent him a letter denying him permission to establish a PAC, but Colbert had Potter back on the show, who explained to Colbert and his audience that as a result of the Citizens United decision, Super PACs can be formed, which are less restrictive than regular PACs.

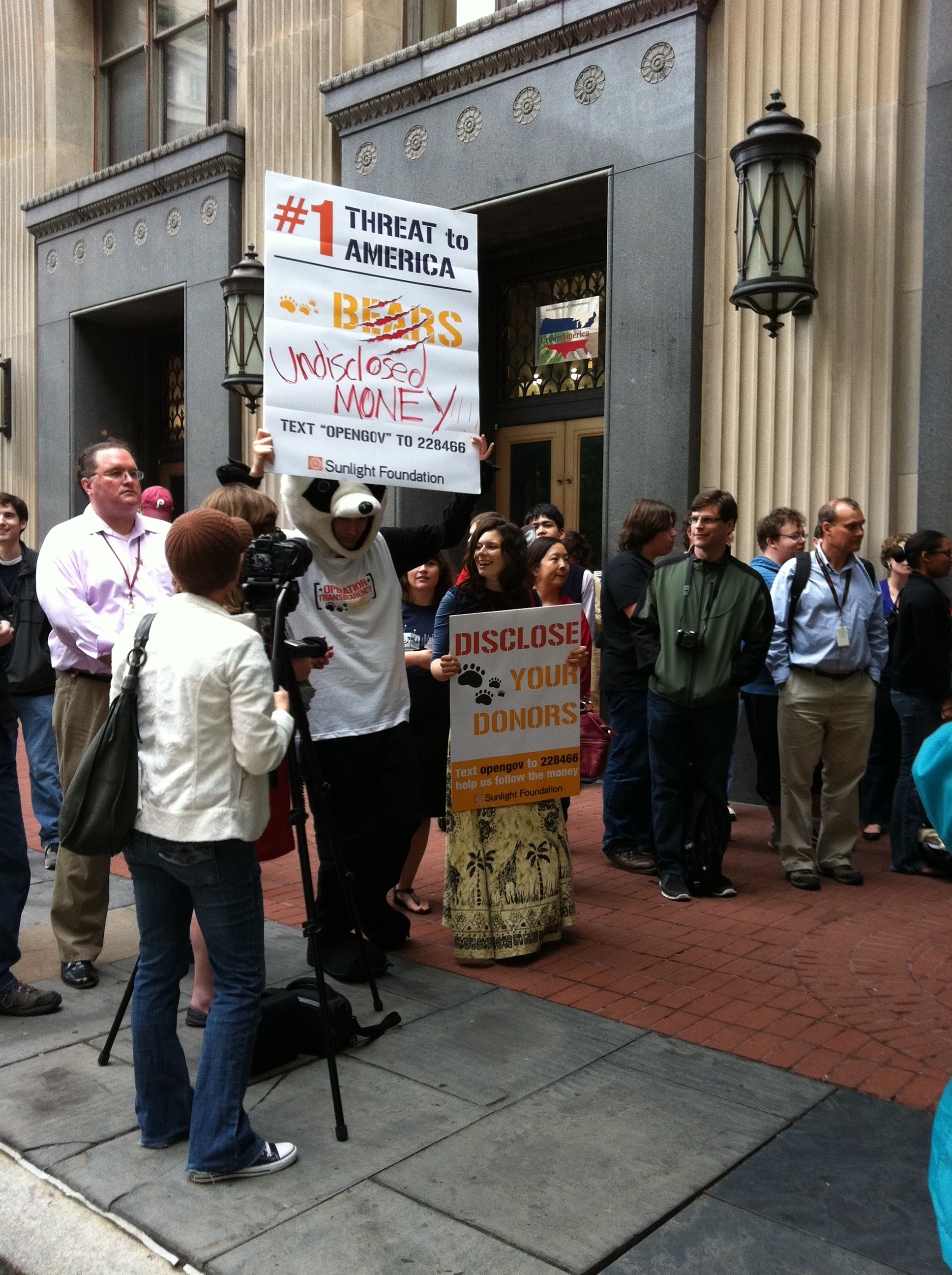
Demonstrators from the Sunlight Foundation outside FEC offices

Colbert filed a request with the FEC asking for a media exemption to allow his then-prospective Super PAC to be promoted on The Colbert Report without being subject to normal campaign finance rules and disclosure requirements. The FEC voted 5–1 to grant The Colbert Report a limited media exemption during a June 2011 public meeting. Following the hearing, Colbert formally filed paperwork for the creation of his super PAC with the FEC secretary. The FEC approved Colbert's bid to form a super PAC on June 30, 2011.

Troubled by the fact that large corporations were not donating to his super PAC, on September 29, 2011, Potter explained that corporations prefer to remain anonymous when supporting political causes. Therefore, he helped Colbert set up in Delaware a 501(c)(4) shell corporation to which donations can be given anonymously without limit and used for political purposes, similar to American Crossroads. It was initially named the "Anonymous Shell Corporation", but according to the Delaware Secretary of State's Office the official name was changed to "Colbert Super PAC SHH Institute" on the same day.

Donations made to the shell corporation could be funneled to ColbertPAC without disclosure of the ultimate source of the donation. When Colbert asked what the difference is between this and money laundering, Potter answered, "It's hard to say."

Colbert was the sole board member of the shell corporation and initially served as president, secretary, and treasurer of his organization, whose stated purpose was to educate the public. However, the organization could legally donate to his Super PAC, lobby for legislation, and participate in political campaigns and elections, as long as campaigning is not the organization's primary purpose. Colbert's organization could legally accept unlimited funds which may be donated by anonymous donors. Since the FEC doesn't require full disclosure, Colbert likened his 501(c)(4) to a "Campaign finance glory hole": "You stick your money in the hole, the other person accepts your donation, and because it's happening anonymously, no one feels dirty!" Colbert said in September 2011 that he was looking for a billionaire donor, or in the language of Colbert, a "sugar daddy".

According to experts, Colbert's actions were perfectly legal and shine a light on how the financing of elections has dramatically changed since the Citizens United ruling. Speaking in 2014, Trevor Potter said:

[Colbert] was able to show America the loopholes (or "loop-chasms" as he called them) in the laws designed to regulate coordination between candidates and supposedly "independent" groups. By having his own Super PAC and 501(c)(4), Stephen could evolve right alongside the campaigns—or often be a step ahead of them. His understanding of the possibilities inherent in the legal confusion was keen enough to discover and exploit absurd legalities before it became clear that actual candidates and political activists were doing the same thing.

Potter called Colbert's ability to not only quickly understand complicated financial and legal concepts but to also make them funny "pure genius".

== Funds ==
In an October 2011 email to his supporters Colbert explained how his 501(c)(4) could be used to legally launder anonymous donations to his Super PAC, "Americans for a Better Tomorrow, Tomorrow".

As you know, when we began Colbert Super PAC, we had a simple dream; to use the Supreme Court's Citizens United ruling to fashion a massive money cannon that would make all those who seek the White House quake with fear and beg our allegiance ... in strict accordance with federal election law.

And you've responded generously; giving your (or, possibly, your parents') hard-earned money in record numbers. And although we value those donations, we were somewhat surprised to note that none of them ended in "-illion".

That is why I formed the Colbert Super PAC S.H.H., a 501(c)(4), to help lure the big donors. As anybody who thumbs through the tax code on the toilet knows, a 501(c)(4) organization is a nonprofit that can take unlimited donations and never has to report the donors. This should be especially helpful considering that establishing this new 501(c)(4) has quadrupled our parentheses budget.

Already, we have gotten a massive donation from [NAME WITHHELD], a kind and [ADJECTIVE WITHHELD] person who only wants to [OBJECTIVE WITHHELD].

In a January 31, 2012, FEC filing, the Super PAC reported raising over $219,000, making a grand total of $1.02 million raised. The filing also listed donors who gave more than $200 to the Super PAC, including Lieutenant Governor of California Gavin Newsom ($500), actor Bradley Whitford ($250), and actress Laura San Giacomo ($250). In a press release Colbert said, "We raised it on my show and used it to materially influence the elections — in full accordance with the law. It's the way our founding fathers would have wanted it, if they had founded corporations instead of just a country." Colbert Super PAC reported raising over $33,000 in February 2012, with approximately $780,000 cash on hand. In the final pre-election filing for the 2012 general election, Americans for a Better Tomorrow, Tomorrow reported $776,731 still on hand, with total contributions for the election cycle of $1,231,916. In 2024 it was revealed that an unnamed billionaire had offered to donate $500,000 on top of the $1.02 million already raised, which Colbert rejected.

Colbert Super PAC had more donors in the state of Texas than Restore Our Future, the super PAC supporting Mitt Romney's 2012 presidential campaign.

== Ad campaigns ==
On August 10, 2011, the first ad by the Super PAC, titled "Episode IV: A New Hope" ran in Iowa, telling Iowans to write-in "Rick Parry" ("With an 'A' for America -- With an 'A' for IowA") instead of Rick Perry at the Ames Straw Poll. The following day the second ad ("Behind the Green Corn") was run. Two Iowa television stations ran the ads; however, WOI-TV told Colbert that they would not run the ads because they considered them confusing to viewers.

In October 2011, the Super PAC released its third ad, titled "Foul Balls", concerning the 2011 NBA lockout. It also released a fourth ad, also related to the NBA lockout, titled "Ball Gags".

== Run for "President of the United States of South Carolina" ==
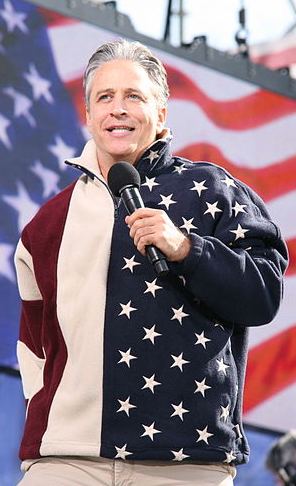
Jon Stewart, the president pro tempore of the Colbert Super PAC, at the Rally to Restore Sanity and/or Fear

During the January 12, 2012 episode of The Colbert Report, Colbert announced his plans to run for "President of the United States of South Carolina". Colbert's lawyer, Trevor Potter, made it clear that it is illegal for Colbert to run for president while active in his Super PAC (though it would be perfectly legal for him to "volunteer" on its behalf). Colbert then signed over control of his Super PAC to Jon Stewart as president pro tempore, and announced that the organization would now be referred to as "The Definitely Not Coordinating With Stephen Colbert Super PAC". Immediately after this legal block was removed, Colbert announced his decision to form an exploratory committee for his run for "President of the United States of South Carolina". Super PACs are not allowed to coordinate directly with candidates or political parties since they are "independent"; however, a candidate may talk to his super PAC through the media and the Super PAC can listen, just like everybody else.

In a press release, the new PAC president, Jon Stewart, denied that he and Colbert would secretly coordinate their efforts: "Stephen and I have in no way have worked out a series of Morse-code blinks to convey information with each other on our respective shows."

During the run-up to the South Carolina primary, the super PAC released an "over the top negative ad" attacking Mitt Romney ("If Mitt Romney really believes 'corporations are people, my friend' then Mitt Romney is a serial killer") and another which first attacked Stephen Colbert and then attacked the Super PAC itself. Both urged South Carolinians to vote for Herman Cain (a former candidate who had suspended his campaign but whose name still appeared on the primary ballot), whom Colbert was using as a proxy as it was too late to get on the ballot himself.

A January 19 poll showed that if Colbert were to run for "president of the United States of South Carolina", 18% said they were at least "kinda somewhat likely" to cast their ballot for Colbert, including 4% who were very likely, 7% who were somewhat likely, and 7% who were "kinda somewhat likely". However, 13% reported they were not too likely, 56% say they were not likely at all, 8% didn't know enough about him, and 4% were unsure. Poll results showed that 52% of the potential Republican primary electorate in South Carolina were aware that Stephen Colbert was exploring a potential candidacy for president of the United States of South Carolina, while 48% were unaware or unsure. 21% of the potential Republican primary electorate reported they would be more likely to vote for former candidate Herman Cain if that vote served as encouragement for Colbert, while 62% would be less likely to cast their ballot for Cain, and 9% were unsure. On January 21, the "Cain/Colbert" combo received over 6,000 votes, a fifth-place finish.

== College campus chapters ==
Colbert announced that the Colbert Super PAC would come to college campuses, with the first college chapter of Colbert Super PAC recognized at the University of Texas at Austin. To facilitate this expansion, kits were available for purchase on the Super PAC website that contained instructions on how to start a Super PAC and several other seemingly unrelated items. Also included was a treasure map, which allowed students who started their own Super PAC to begin a scavenger hunt with a personal appearance by Colbert himself as the prize. On June 29, it was announced that a student from the University of Pittsburgh won the challenge and would receive the visit.

== Dissolution of the Super PAC ==
On November 12, 2012, Colbert announced his intention to dissolve Colbert Super PAC, citing the death of his fictional advisor "Ham Rove", a parody of Republican strategist Karl Rove. Colbert reported that the Super PAC still had nearly $800,000 in funds. Colbert's lawyer, Trevor Potter, advised Stephen that he could form a second anonymous 501(c)(4), then make out a check with the remaining funds to his first 501(c)(4) along with an Agency Letter which instructed the original 501(c)(4) to pay those funds to the second 501(c)(4) and give dispersal instructions to that second 501(c)(4). In doing so, he could avoid telling anyone - even the IRS - where the money went.

On December 13, 2012, Colbert reported that a nonprofit called the "Ham Rove Memorial Foundation", which Colbert was "surprised" he was on the board of, received a donation of $773,704.83, which was the amount that was left over from the Super PAC according to termination reports filed with the FEC. This money was distributed in $125,000 increments equally to four charities: DonorsChoose Hurricane Sandy Relief Fund, Team Rubicon, Habitat for Humanity, and the Yellow Ribbon Fund. The remaining money was split between the Campaign Legal Center and OpenSecrets, which both focus on campaign finance reform in the United States. As part of the acceptance of the "Ham Rove Memorial Fund" donation, the Campaign Legal Center agreed to name their meeting space "The Ham Rove Memorial Conference Room". Additionally, OpenSecrets agreed to name its conference room "The Colbert Super Pac Memorial Conference Room".

== Recognition and impact ==
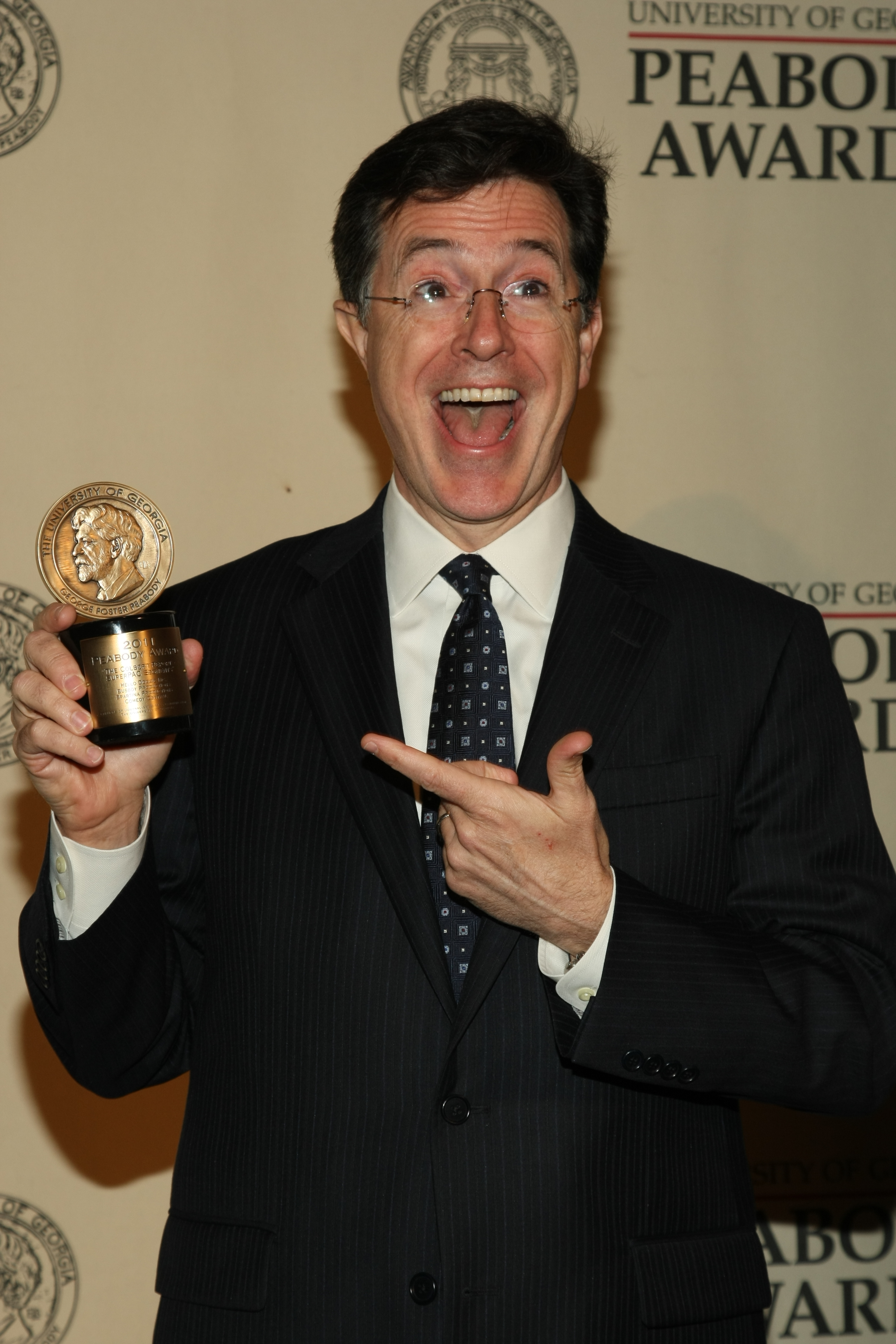
Stephen Colbert at the 71st Annual Peabody Awards

In April 2012, Stephen Colbert was the recipient of a Peabody Award for his Super PAC parody, which was cited as an "innovative means of teaching American viewers about the landmark court decision". In June 2014, the Annenberg Public Policy Center reported that the Colbert Super PAC segments increased viewers' knowledge of PAC and 501(c)(4) campaign finance regulation more successfully than other types of news media.

Additionally, a 2012 election interview ascertained that viewing The Colbert Report increased knowledge and perception of super PACs and "501(c)(4) groups". It showed an increase in knowledge of campaign finance regulation regarding independent expenditure groups. Their findings emphasize how the political satirist was successful in informing his viewers, even more than alternative types of news and media. Observing The Colbert Report affected how viewers perceived money in politics.

== See also ==
- Buddy Roemer, who starred in an advertisement for the Colbert Super PAC
- Alex Rigopulos, who donated to the PAC
- Stephen Colbert's AmeriCone Dream, the lid of which "Superpack" referred to the PAC
- Our Lady of Perpetual Exemption
