= Stone Phillips =

American reporter (born 1954)

- Born: December 2, 1954 (age 71); Texas City, Texas, U.S.
- Education: Yale University
- Occupations: Television news anchor and correspondent
- Years active: 1978–2014
- Employer(s): ABC News, NBC News, PBS
- Spouse: Debra Del Toro-Phillips

Stone Phillips (born December 2, 1954) is an American retired television reporter and correspondent on ABC, NBC, and PBS. He is widely known as the former co-anchor of Dateline NBC, a news magazine TV series. He has also worked as a substitute anchor for NBC Nightly News and Today and as a substitute moderator on Meet the Press. Prior to his tenure at NBC, he was an ABC News correspondent for 20/20 and World News Tonight.

== Early life ==
Born December 2, 1954, in Texas City, Texas, Phillips is the son of Victor and Grace Phillips, a Monsanto chemical engineer and school teacher, respectively. Victor Phillips is a veteran of World War II. Phillips and his siblings—brother Victor III and sister Minta—were raised in the Claymont section of Ballwin, Missouri, in the Greater St. Louis area.

As a boy Phillips was an acolyte at St. Martin's Episcopal Church in Ellisville, Missouri, where his parents were founding members of the congregation. Phillips attended Parkway West High School in Ballwin, Missouri, where he was an honor student and starting quarterback on the football team. Phillips is of Scottish ancestry.

Phillips matriculated at Yale University where he continued to excel in academics and in athletics. In 1976, he was starting quarterback for the Yale Bulldogs squad that won the Ivy League football championship. Phillips was a member of Yale's Scroll and Key secret society and earned the university's prestigious F. Gordon Brown Award for outstanding academic and athletic leadership. Phillips graduated with honors from Yale in 1977, earning a Bachelor of Philosophy.

== Career ==
After graduating from Yale, Phillips moved to Atlanta, Georgia, where he worked as a remedial reading and math teacher at the Fulton County Juvenile Detention Center. He was supplementing his pay by moonlighting as a waiter when he landed an entry-level news position at WXIA-TV, the local NBC affiliate.

In 1980, after less than two years as a reporter, writer, and broadcast producer in Atlanta, Phillips was hired by ABC News as an assignment editor for its Washington, D.C., news bureau. In 1982, he began filing stories as an on-air correspondent for ABC, covering such major events as the war in Lebanon, the exodus of Vietnamese boat people in the mid-1980s, and Rajiv Gandhi's election campaign following the assassination of his mother, Indira Gandhi. In 1986, Phillips was promoted to a regular role on the ABC news magazine 20/20. Beginning that year, he also served as a substitute host on Good Morning America and a sports anchor for ABC's World News Sunday.

Phillips ended his twelve-year relationship with ABC in 1992, joining NBC News to serve 15 years as co-anchor with Jane Pauley and co-anchoring with Ann Curry 4 years on Dateline NBC. While at NBC News, Phillips also hosted Weekend Magazine with Stone Phillips. He conducted a long list of notable interviews during his time with NBC. Among them was the first network interview with Lynndie England, the U.S. Army soldier, about her role in the Abu Ghraib prison scandal. Others included notorious serial killer Jeffrey Dahmer, Russian president Boris Yeltsin, and Bernhard Goetz (a man who shot four black teenagers in the New York City Subway). The last earned Phillips an Emmy Award for Outstanding Interview. Phillips co-anchored Dateline NBC from its inception until July 2, 2007, when NBC did not renew his $7 million contract.

On October 17, 2005, Phillips was the guest on the premiere episode of The Colbert Report. Phillips' delivery was part of the inspiration for comedian Stephen Colbert's persona on The Daily Show with Jon Stewart. On December 18, 2014, Phillips would again appear on the final episode of The Colbert Report.

As of 2012, Phillips was contributing reports to the PBS NewsHour. In 2013, he reported on golf course water usage for The Golf Channel.

In May 2013, Phillips produced and hosted Moving with Grace, a documentary airing on PBS stations that chronicled his efforts and those of his siblings to provide care for their aging parents. It also explored various issues faced by other baby boomers in similar circumstance.

Stone Phillips was portrayed by Bill Heck in Primetime (2026).

== Personal life ==
Phillips lives in New York with his wife, Debra Del Toro-Phillips, who is Puerto Rican and moved to New York City as a child. After a successful career in the fashion industry, she returned to college and earned a master's degree in social work.
