= List of The Colbert Report characters =

The Colbert Report is an American late-night talk show and news satire hosted by Stephen Colbert that aired four days a week on Comedy Central from 2005 to 2014. The show focused on a fictional anchorman character named Stephen Colbert, a caricature of televised political pundits, by his real-life namesake. The program lampooned current events and American political happenings.

== Main characters ==
- Stephen Colbert (played by Stephen Colbert) – Described as a "well-intentioned, poorly informed high-status idiot," the show's host is a blustery, self-obsessed right-wing commentator with a strong distaste for facts. He incorporates aspects of the real Colbert's life and interests, but is modelled primarily as a parody of cable news pundits, particularly Bill O'Reilly.
- The Bullet – The bullet point produces the words that appear on the right side of the screen during the show's "The Wørd" segment. It frequently provides comedic asides and counterpoints to what Colbert is saying, occasionally even contradicting or arguing with him. As the real Colbert explains it, often "the bullet points end up being their own character. Sometimes they're reinforcing my argument, sometimes they're countermanding my argument. It's a textual addition of jokes or satire to the verbal essay I'm doing at the moment."

== Retired characters ==
- Jimmy (played by Peter Gwinn) – The show's director, who shared his name with real-life Colbert Report director Jim Hoskinson, he was often heard but rarely seen on the show, though Colbert frequently addressed him to ask for video or graphics to be brought up on the screen. He was also a huge fan of the band Rush, to the point of replacing the video of Colbert with a shot of Neil Peart's drum kit on the episode in which Rush appeared as guests.
- Wilford Brimley (played by Stephen Colbert) – Colbert's "Spiritual Advisor" with whom he occasionally had phone conversations. These conversations usually took place in the middle of the night, with Colbert only half-awake, and end up with Brimley (voiced by Colbert) going off on angry tangents that he usually blames on "The Diabeetus".
- Ching Chong Ding Dong (played by Stephen Colbert) – Colbert's stereotypical Asian impression, who "roves" tea. Colbert (the character) defended himself against criticism for the character by stating that as Ching Chong Ding Dong was merely a fictional character, he was not a racist and he could not be held responsible for what Ding Dong says, a jab at the relationship between Colbert the character and Colbert the actor.
- Esteban Colberto (played by Stephen Colbert) – A Cuban themed version of Colbert who was actually a self-described Mexican. He hosts the Colberto Reporto Gigante and was usually flanked by two dancing chicas. He appeared in numerous immigration-themed segments.
- Benjamin Franklin (played by Ralph Archbold) – The Founding Father made occasional appearances in the show. He first featured in a "Better Know a District" spin-off called "Better Know a Founder", and later returned as a recurring character when The Colbert Report did four special shows live from Philadelphia's University of Pennsylvania in the run-up to the Democratic Party's 2008 Pennsylvania primary.
- Killer (uncredited) – A roadie for Colbert. Due to his constant scowl, threatening stare, and probable criminal history, he was the only staff member that Colbert was afraid to abuse. He also has been described by Colbert as a "Demolitions Expert".
- Meg (played by Meg DeFrancesco) – A female intern on Colbert's staff, she frequently endured sexual harassment and suggestive remarks from him and in a 2008 appearance mentions that she has filed more than five complaints against him.
- The Professor (uncredited) – A homeless man who was mentioned as Colbert's "protégé" from time to time. This mention was usually accompanied by a picture of 'The Professor' howling madly.
- Sweetness – Colbert's pistol, "life partner," and the "co-host" of "Trigger Happy", a segment which dealt with gun-related issues. Colbert claimed that he can hear Sweetness talking to him and would often converse with "her" by holding the gun up to his deaf ear and then relaying what "she" has supposedly said. Sweetness made a final appearance as the weapon that killed Grimmy with Colbert tossing it away into the possession of a fan. Resembles a Colt Detective Special, Third Issue.
- Tad (played by Paul Dinello) – The building manager at Colbert's studio. He hosted several special segments, such as a fire drill, a visit to a bank auction for Randy "Duke" Cunningham's assets and a trip to Colbert County, Alabama, to open The Stephen Colbert Museum and Gift Shop. It is implied that Colbert and Tad maintain a secret relationship, even almost getting married on the show. The relationship mirrors that of Colbert and Dinello's characters on Strangers with Candy.
- Gorlock (uncredited) – A luminous green alien in a business suit who only appeared in stills. Gorlock was Colbert's financial adviser, although he did not fill the role particularly well, failing to warn Colbert of impending financial crises despite being from the future. Colbert claimed Gorlock was recommended to him by Tom Cruise, and made his portfolio "thetan-free". Gorlock has an associate called "Hal", a reference to Arthur C. Clarke's fictional computer character HAL 9000.
- P.K. Winsome (played by Tim Meadows) – (Percy Kittens Winsome) A political commentator, entrepreneur, and black Republican. P.K. sells questionable Barack Obama commemorative merchandise. He was played by former Saturday Night Live cast member Meadows, who also starred with Colbert in an episode of Strangers With Candy. Meadows appeared as Winsome in a pre-taped segment at the Rally to Restore Sanity and/or Fear, and also voiced him in the audiobook of America Again.
- Homer (played by Kumail Nanjiani) – A Greek man mistaken by Colbert for an Arab terrorist called "Omar" and imprisoned in a cell beneath Colbert's desk. He returned to the Report as a member of the staff.
- Barry the Starbucks guy (played by Barry Julien) – A Starbucks barista employed at the Starbucks under Stephen Colbert's desk, who appears in Starbucks related segments.
- An Audience Member (played by Tom Purcell) – An audience member that Stephen often shot in the knee either on purpose or accidentally.
- Tek Jansen – an animated Science Fiction character.
- Charlene – A woman whom Colbert stalked since the 1980s. Although she never physically appeared on the show, she was the subject of two songs Colbert wrote.
- Jay the Intern (played by Jay Katsir) – A young man Stephen occasionally mock abused in stories relating to internships and college students.
- Hans Beinholtz (played by Erik Frandsen) – The existentialist fictional UN ambassador from Germany. He was portrayed as replying to Colbert's questions and statements with deeply philosophical (and often aggressively depressing) remarks.
- Buddy Cole (played by Scott Thompson) – originally from The Kids in the Hall, he appeared during the week of the 2014 Winter Olympics.
- Randy Ferrar – A fictional Huffington Post writer.
- James – An Asian intern whose name Colbert mispronounced as "Jah-mes"
- Grimmy – Colbert's travel agent who appeared in the opening of the "Cheating Death" segments and becoming more recurring as the series came to its end. Though intended to be the guest of the final episode, Grimmy accidentally got killed off by Colbert during a last "Cheating Death" segment.

The recurring character 'Ham Rove'

- Alan (played by Jordan Carlos) – Colbert's former token black friend, he was demoted to "black acquaintance" after Colbert saw him march in an anti-war demonstration.
- Bobby (played by Eric Drysdale) – A stage manager, played by Colbert Report writer Eric Drysdale. He frequently was called upon to do degrading things or to answer questions from Colbert and was responsible for keeping track of the whereabouts of Colbert's "son", Stephen Jr. On the April 21, 2008 show, following Drysdale's departure from the writing staff, it was insinuated that Colbert had eaten Bobby during a commercial break. Bobby's ghost made an appearance on December 11, 2008, where he was again cannibalized by Colbert. On 28 October 2009, Bobby reappeared (in living form) as part of a joke about time travel and the Higgs boson.
- Russ Lieber (played by David Cross) – A satirical liberal radio talk show host from Madison, Wisconsin, and the nemesis of Colbert. He is ultra-sensitive to political correctness, and often worries that his own words might be misconstrued as offensive. Colbert frequently encountered him during the early days of the show. Lieber has appeared several times on the show to debate. He appears to be a satirical take on Al Franken.
- Gulpy –An anthropomorphic Gulpzilla soda that Colbert kept as a pet to drink. Gulpy would normally try to kill him, but Colbert later said that they had gone to therapy and were all better. When Michael Bloomberg banned all drinks larger than 16 oz. in New York City, Colbert "killed" Gulpy.
- Ham Rove – A raw canned ham with glasses that stood in for Republican strategist Karl Rove in various discussions of statements Rove had made or topics like Super PAC's which Rove was related to. After the 2012 election, fearing reprisal for not wielding enough influence with his Colbert Super PAC, Colbert stabbed and killed Ham Rove. Colbert Super PAC's website featured a memorial to Ham Rove, including his list of ingredients.
