= Yellow Ribbon Fund =

Charity that helps returning American service men & women

- Formation: March 1, 2005
- Type: Non-profit
- Headquarters: Bethesda, Maryland, United States
- Key people: Bill Scott (Board Chairman) Gina Harrow (Executive Director)
- Website: https://yellowribbonfund.org/

The Yellow Ribbon Fund (YRF) is a charity that primarily helps returning American service men & women, injured during active service, who are recovering at Walter Reed Army Medical Center and Bethesda Naval Hospital. The charity was founded on March 1, 2005 and is based in Bethesda, MD.

== Mission ==
The YRF helps recovering service members through various events and programs, arranged by staff and volunteers, aimed to help the patients and their families enjoy the community. The YRF has arranged numerous parties, trips (to places like Fredericksburg, the carnival, etc.), and even weddings.

== Support from celebrities and other organizations ==
Several high-profile people have supported the charity, including Mandy Moore, Marty Cordova, Dana White and Forrest Griffin. The charity has also received help from the satirical television program The Colbert Report. Stephen Colbert announced that he would donate all proceeds made by his WristStrong wrist bands and the auction of his cast would go to the Yellow Ribbon Fund. The winning bid for his cast was $17,200. As of January 23, 2008, over 30,000 WristStrong Bracelets were sold. Marie Wood, Director of Communications, was presented a gigantic novelty cheque for $171,525 on The Report that day.

Many companies and organizations have worked with, and donated to, the YRF to support them in their mission of helping injured service members. Those organizations include, but are not limited to Independent Benefit Services, the Army Navy Country Club, American Airlines, Mary House, and Barwood Taxi.

== See also ==
- H. Timothy "Tim" Vakoc – the first U.S. military chaplain to die from wounds received in the Iraq War.
