= List of The Colbert Report episodes (2010) =

- No. of episodes: 161

Release
- Original network: Comedy Central

Season chronology
- ← Previous; 2009 episodes Next → 2011 episodes

This is a list of episodes for The Colbert Report in 2010.

== 2010 ==
=== January ===
|- |- |- |- |- |- |- |- |- |- |- |- |- |- |-

No.	"The Wørd"	Guest(s)	Introductory phrase	Original release date	Prod. code
653	"None"	Erick Erickson	"(we see Stephen in the old studio) Welcome to the show, and Happy New Year, everybody. It's 2010, and we've upgraded to high definition, the cutting-edge technology of 2007. Over our break, digital wizards retooled the broadcasts, and plastic surgeons retooled my face. I just hope the butt fat I had injected into my cheeks wasn't from the butt... (suspense sound) ...of a murderer. I'm also getting a whole new set which means it's time to say a-goodbye to some old friends. (walks over to the guest desk and chairs) Lots of great memories here. So many amazing guests sat in this chair, and absorbed my rage. (Stephen then walks to the shelves) Oh! Then there's this one time I almost read these books. Oh, Rock 'Em Sock 'Em Robots with your fighting! (briefly plays around with it) Get a room already. But I think I'll miss you most of all... box containing Gwyneth Paltrow's head. (shakes the box around and puts it back on the shelf) Well, set, we had a great run, but like all good relationships, I need to be the one who ends it. So I'll just grab the essentials. (walks over to the desk and grabs his Emmy Award and Peabody Award trophies as he is about to leave the set) Come on guys, moving on. What the... How long has that been there? (as Stephen walks to the door, we reveal that it leads to the new HD studio) My god, this is The Colbert Report!"	January 4	6001
Colbert says goodbye to his studio set in anticipation of a new one, which is introduced after the titles amid jokes about the show now broadcasting in widescreen high-definition. In a remote segment, the host attempts another Winter Olympics sport, curling, with the official U.S. Olympics curling team. Erick Erickson, managing editor of RedState, is the guest.
654	"Ideal Or No Deal"	Riley Crane	"Happy 79th birthday, Robert Duvall. I love the smell of Metamucil in the morning. This is The Colbert Report."	January 5	6002
In response to the attempted Christmas Day 2009 bombing, the show begins a "A Colbert Report Special Report: Night of Terror – The Crapification of the American Pant-scape." The attacker's base country of Yemen is profiled on Better Know an Enemy, featuring a new touch-screen monitor that soon stole focus from the subject. Guest Dr. Riley Crane completed a Pentagon-created challenge to find ten balloons randomly located throughout the United States.
655	"None"	Ezra Klein, Linda Douglass, Charles J. Moore	"God never closes a door without opening a window. His heating bills are outrageous. This is The Colbert Report."	January 6	6003
Stephen interviews Ezra Klein about the current state of the health care reform bill. Linda Douglass appears via satellite to discuss the same bill and defend herself from allegations made by Monday's guest, Erick Erickson. In Alpha Dog of the Week, Stephen praises Domino's Pizza for a new ad campaign which condemns their own previous recipe. Guest Charles Moore discovered the Great Pacific Garbage Patch.
656	"None"	Barry Scheck, James H. Fowler	"No one tell me who won the college football championship tonight. Because I do not care. This is The Colbert Report."	January 7	6004
Talks about the death penalty with Barry Scheck, co-director of the Innocence Project, and then interviews James Fowler about his book Connected: The Surprising Power of Our Social Networks and How They Shape Our Lives. When Fowler describes how obesity can spread from person to person, Stephen replies "Okay, I've gained some weight. Just come out and say that I'm fat."
657	"None"	Eugene Jarecki, Morgan Freeman	None	January 11	6005
Harry Reid saying Obama has "no negro dialect", moving money to smaller banks, estate tax expiring for one year, ivy league secret societies, Invictus.
658	"None"	Philip Glass, Raj Patel	"Simon Cowell is leaving American Idol. He wants to spend more time berating his family. This is The Colbert Report."	January 12	6006
Roxy the Sex Robot, Dick Cheney saying Obama is "trying to pretend we are not at war", mobile phone use may reverse Alzheimer's, medicine to treat jetlag, drug to enhance libido in women, The Value of Nothing.
659	"None"	John Heilemann	"One-third of the American adults are now obese. In fact, one-third of American adults are now one-half of American adults. This is The Colbert Report."	January 13	6007
Game Change, Gilbert Arenas pulling out a gun in locker room, Mark McGwire admits to using steroids, criticism of Avatar from the Vatican, Avatar causing depression, Na'vi sex scene on Avatar DVD,
660	"Honor Bound"	Kathleen Sebelius	"Why isn't anyone talking about what NBC did to Johnny Carson? He's dead! This is The Colbert Report."	January 14	6008
Iron Chef America White House garden scandal, Wall Street CEOs testify in front of Congress, Haiti earthquake, proposed health care bill, H1N1 vaccine
661	"None"	Margaret Palmer, Emily Pilloton	"It's King day and I gave my staff the day off so you and I could be alone. I have a dream. This is The Colbert Report."	January 18	6009
United States Senate special election in Massachusetts, 2010, mountaintop coal mining, Goldman Sachs considers charity requirement, Own a Piece of Histor-Me: A Colbert Nation Liquidation, humanitarian design.
662	"None"	Stephen Bosworth	"Apple's about the introduce their new iTablet. You're gonna wanna buy two of 'em, iMoses. This is The Colbert Report."	January 19	6010
Jesus rifles, Colbert Nation US Speedskating pledge drive, Stephen races speedskater Shani Davis (part 1), North Korea
663	"None"	Dick Ebersol	"Love means never having to say you're sorry. That's why I never apologize to my mirror. This is The Colbert Report."	January 20	6011
Massachusetts special election, NBC coverage of the Winter Olympics, Stephen races speedskater Shani Davis (part 2)
664	"Two-Faced"	John Farmer Jr.	"Never let them see you sweat. Especially in HD 'cause it looks like a mudslide. This is The Colbert Report."	January 21	6012
Own a Piece of Histor-Me: A Colbert Nation Liquidation, the Taliban's new code of conduct, Brad Pitt's beard's 1 year anniversary, Barack Obama's first year of presidency, Threatdown airport security edition, The Ground Truth
665	"Manifest Density"	Kati Marton	"Did ya hear? I'm the new quarterback of the Minnesota Vikings. This is The Colbert Report."	January 25	6013
Obama's article "Why Haiti Matters", Biden's article "Why America Needs Trains", Alpha Dog of the Week: Harold Ford Jr. challenging Kirsten Gillibrand in New York senate primary election, Enemies of the People
666	"None"	Paul Begala, Mika Brzezinski	None	January 26	6014
André Bauer's comments about people on social welfare programs, Democrats losing Massachusetts's senate seat to Scott Brown, Tip of the Hat, Wag of the Finger: Creigh Deeds, iPhone's ScareBear app, All Things at Once
667	"Prece-Don't"	Arthur T. Benjamin	"Seriously, give me an iPad. This is The Colbert Report."	January 27	6015
Hamid Karzai's hat, Citizens United v. Federal Election Commission, James O'Keefe arrested by US Marshalls, Secrets of Mental Math, The Joy of Mathematics
668	"None"	David Gergen	None	January 28	6016
2010 State of the Union Address, response to the address by Governor Bob McDonnell (R-VA), comparison of Obama and JFK, Sport Report: whites-only basketball league, Australian Olympic hurdler has breast implant removed to increase speed

=== February ===
|- |- |- |- |- |- |- |- |- |- |-

No.	"The Wørd"	Guest(s)	Introductory phrase	Original release date	Prod. code
669	"Siren Song"	Nicole Miller, Jessica Smith, Harold Ford Jr.	None	February 1	6017
Stephen won a Grammy Award, Obama invited to Republican Annual Retreat, Stephen's job as assistant sports psychologist, Harold Ford Jr. challenging Kirsten Gillibrand in Senate Democratic primary election
670	"Cognoscor Ergo Sum"	Henry Allen, Eliot Spitzer	"Happy Black History Month to all my black viewer. This is The Colbert Report."	February 2	6018
blippy.com: a social networking website where people post their credit card purchases, tribute to J. D. Salinger, lack of restructuring in financial services sector
671	"None"	Peter Cove, John Durant	"Jon Stewart went on The O'Reilly Factor tonight. I hope he brought me back a toaster. This is The Colbert Report."	February 3	6019
Repeal of "Don't ask, don't tell", unemployment in America, caveman diet
672	"None"	Henry Louis Gates Jr.	"If it's an eye for an eye and a tooth for a tooth, why is there no eye-fairy? This is The Colbert Report."	February 4	6020
LGBT people serving in the military, Tip of the Hat, Wag of the Finger: waterboarding, The Beaver magazine changing name to Canada's History, Formidable Opponent: civil trial of Khalid Sheikh Mohammed in New York, Faces of America
673	"Faux 'n' Tell"	Jonathan Safran Foer	None	February 8	6021
674	"None"	Chris Dodd, George Stephanopoulos	None	February 9	6022
675	"None"	Mike Quigley, Claire Danes	"Honda is recalling almost a million vehicles for faulty airbags. It seems the only Japanese company we can trust these days are the guys who make sex robots. This is The Colbert Report."	February 10	6023
676	"Political Suicide"	Al Michaels, David A. Ross	None	February 11	6024
677	"None"	Ed Colbert, Ujjal Dosanjh, Shaun White	"It's 11:30 at night, and the sun is still shining. They wonder why there's no snow here! This is The Colbert Report!"	February 22	6025
Colbert's copyright lawyer brother Ed warns Stephen against using terms such as "the Olympics" or "Vancouver" in his coverage in order to avoid lawsuit, leading Stephen to introduce his elaborately named "Vancouverage." Coverage follows of the opening ceremony, and differences between Canada and the U.S.. In Better Know a Riding, Vancouver South is profiled and Ujjal Dosanjh is interviewed. Snowboarder Shaun White is interviewed in the New York studio.
678	"None"	Lindsey Vonn, Bob Costas	None	February 23	6026
Stephen recaps the latest USA victories in the games and interviews Lindsey Vonn via satellite from the New York studio. In a field segment, Stephen visits the official Switzerland, Ireland and Russia international houses stationed in Vancouver. First Stephen visits the Switzerland house where he challenges Director Manuel Salchli to Fondue pong. But despite Manuel's win, Stephen got to chug a $30 bowl of cheese for free. Then Stephen heads to the Irish house. Despite the crowd's anticipation to celebrate Ireland's culture, Stephen reads the book "Ulysses" by James Joyce. After reporting a bar fight, he "got the hell out of there". Stephen's last stop was the Russian house where he challenges Russian Olympic bobsled team member Evgeny Plechnkin to table hockey. Stephen distracts him by saying "Look! Vladimir Putin!" and with Al Michaels "Do You Believe In Miracles" in the background, Stephen triumphs in table hockey. After those three visits, Stephen decides to end his trip... at Irish House! Stephen ends the field segment by narrating that "USA house doesn't have a bar". Bob Costas of NBC broadcasting is interviewed on the outdoor Vancouver stage, who ends the interview by climbing on to the set's stuffed moose.
679	"None"	Mike Eruzione	None	February 24	6027
A "Cold War Update: Olympic Edition" includes a one-question interview with Mike Eruzione, and via satellite, Colbert and figure-skating commentator Scott Hamilton discuss Evgeni Plushenko awarding himself a "platinum medal" after his loss to U.S. skater Evan Lysacek. In part one of the "Freud Rage: The Iceman Counseleth" field segment, Stephen uses his position as Assistant Psychologist on the U.S. Speedskating team to give advice to Mitchell Whitmore, Lauren Cholewinski and Tucker Fredricks. Aerial skiers Ryan St. Onge and Jeret Peterson are interviewed on the Vancouver stage.
680	"None"	Shani Davis, Seth Wescott	"I've got Olympic Fever! Either that, or I ate some really bad poutine! This is The Colbert Report."	February 25	6028
With his set overlooking NBC's, Stephen pesters NBC host Bob Costas. In part two of "Freud Rage: The Iceman Counseleth," Stephen discusses strategy with the entire U.S. Speedskating team. He fails to connect with Shani Davis, who then appears via satellite to the New York studio. Stephen attempts to cheer up Canada, who are behind in the overall medal count, before taking them off the On Notice board. From the Vancouver stage, Stephen interviews snowboarder Seth Wescott and thanks those that made his trip to Vancouver possible.

=== March ===
|- |- |- |- |- |- |- |- |- |- |- |- |- |-

No.	"The Wørd"	Guest(s)	Introductory phrase	Original release date	Prod. code
681	"None"	Michael Bublé, Don Cheadle	"This is The Colbert Report."	March 1	6029
682	"Kid-Owe"	David Brooks	"Happy birthday, Dr. Seuss! This is The Colbert Repeuss."	March 2	6030
683	"None"	Scheherazade Rehman, Garry Wills	None	March 3	6031
684	"None"	Barry Schwartz	None	March 4	6032
685	"None"	Ezra Klein, Tom Hanks	None	March 8	6033
686	"Define & Conquer"	Annie Leonard	None	March 9	6034
687	"None"	Charlie Cook, Sean Carroll	"I'm Colbert. Let's Report it, Jimmy."	March 10	6035
688	"None"	Scott Rasmussen, David Aaronovitch	None	March 11	6036
689	"Afghanistan"	Raj Patel, Robert Baer	"The Census is already over budget, and these are the people in charge of counting? This is The Colbert Report."	March 15	6037
690	"None"	Eric Foner, Rebecca Skloot	"Genesis (band) was inducted into the Rock and Roll Hall of Fame. Leviticus missed it by that much. This is The Colbert Report."	March 16	6038
691	"None"	Nell Irvin Painter	None	March 17	6039
692	"None"	James Martin, Mary Matalin	None	March 18	6040
693	"Napolean Blown Apart"	Claire McCaskill	None	March 29	6041
694	"Forgive and Forget"	Simon Johnson	"The Large Hadron Collider is up and working. However, it prefers to be called the Big-boned Hadron Collider. This is The Colbert Report."	March 30	6042
695	"None"	Craig Mullaney	"President Obama has approved off-shore oil exploration. Or, in layman's terms: Yes we can...drill, baby, drill. This is The Colbert Report."	March 31	6043

=== April ===
|- |- |- |- |- |- |- |- |- |- |- |- |- |- |- |-

No.	"The Wørd"	Guest(s)	Introductory phrase	Original release date	Prod. code
696	"None"	David Frum, Judith Shulevitz	"The new iPads are out and I didn't get a free one...or did I? This is The Colbert Report."	April 1	6044
697	"Bait and Snitch"	Dean Kamen	"Word of advice to anyone that bought an iPad: they are NOT dishwasher-safe. This is The Colbert Report."	April 5	6045
698	"None"	Joe Bastardi, Brenda Ekwurzel, Al Sharpton	None	April 6	6046
699	"None"	Jeff Goldblum, David Simon	None	April 7	6047
700	"Affirmative Inaction"	Neil deGrasse Tyson	"I hope they can resolve the situation in Kyrgyzstan: they are our nation's top supplier of consonants. This is The Colbert Report."	April 8	6048
701	"None"	Jeffrey Toobin, Julian Assange	None	April 12	6049
702	"The Lost Cause"	Hans Beinholtz^{[a]}, Jon Mooallem	None	April 13	6050
703	"None"	Jake Tapper, Bill Adair, David Shields	None	April 14	6051
704	"None"	Aimee Mullins	"The Vatican has forgiven The Beatles. That explains why the altar boys are singing, "Help!" This is The Colbert Report."	April 15	6052
705	"None"	Andrew Ross Sorkin, George Will	None	April 19	6053
706	"None"	Jeffrey Katzenberg	"Don't cry over spilled milk; get angry and punch a cow. This is The Colbert Report."	April 20	6054
707	"No Problemo"	Craig Robinson	None	April 21	6055
708	"Straight To Video; Bønus Wørd: Defamation of Independents"	Gorillaz	None	April 22	6056
Lindsey Graham needs to release a sex tape, and Stephen refuses to interview Gorillaz. Includes the first ever Bønus Wørd: Defamation of Independents.
709	"Docu-Drama"	Sharon Jones & The Dap-Kings	"If I come across as patronizing, maybe it's because I'm more patriotic than you. This is The Colbert Report."	April 26	6057
710	"None"	Conn Iggulden	"Senators Schumer and Franken want to improve Facebook's privacy practices. Guys, just go on MySpace: you can have all the privacy in the world. This is The Colbert Report."	April 27	6058
711	"None"	Gregg Easterbrook	"Sandra Bullock has adopted an African-American child! NFL scouts, I'd sign him now. This IS THE COLBERT REPORT!"	April 28	6059
712	"None"	Abel Maldonado, OK Go	"This is The Colbert Report."	April 29	6060
Show opens with a Rube Goldberg–like device that reveals the various images revealed in the normal digital opening sequence. (This is inspired by OK Go's new album.) Colbert moves across the studio to interview the band on a treadmill that is pushed by stagehands. (This is in reference to a video made by the band in which they moved around on treadmills.) OK Go plays "This to Shall Pass."

=== May ===
|- |- |- |- |- |- |-

No.	"The Wørd"	Guest(s)	Introductory phrase	Original release date	Prod. code
713	"None"	Elizabeth Warren	None	May 3	6061
714	"Flight Risk"	Michael J. Fox, Mark Moffett	"Don't put off till tomorrow what you can do today. I meant to tell you that yesterday, but...f@!k it. This is The Colbert Report."	May 4	6062
715	"None"	David Isay	"BP has shut off one of the three oil leaks. Now they just have to take care of the premium and super leaks. This is The Colbert Report."	May 5	6063
716	"None"	Andrew Sullivan, Stewart Brand	None	May 6	6064
717	"None"	Scheherazade Rehman, Gary Johnson	"Sigmund Freud was born today in eighteen-fifty-sex. Did I say sex? I meant boobs. This is The Colbert Mommy."	May 10	6065
718	"None"	Dahlia Lithwick, Hampton Sides	"Prime Minister Gordon Brown has stepped down. Evidently, he wants to spend more time boring his family. This is The Colbert Report."	May 11	6066
719	"None"	Deepak Chopra	"General Hospital has 18 daytime Emmy nominations, and all I can say to that is: I'm pregnant with my twin brother's baby. This is The Colbert Report!"	May 12	6067
720	"None"	The Hold Steady	"Larry King got back together with his wife. I always knew she was the one of the ones. This is The Colbert Report."	May 13	6068

No new shows the last two weeks of May.

=== June ===
|- |- |- |- |- |- |- |- |- |- |- |- |- |- |- |- |-

No.	"The Wørd"	Guest(s)	Introductory phrase	Original release date	Prod. code
721	"None"	The Atlantis Crew, Ayaan Hirsi Ali	"It's Fleet week! The one time of year I can get away with my Snow White bell-bottoms. This is The Colbert Report."	June 1	6069
Stephen discusses the dangers of vodka eyeballing and determines that Dawn dishwashing liquid is responsible for the oil spill in the Gulf of Mexico.
722	"None"	Kazuo Myazaki, Lisa Miller	"James Cameron has been called in to help BP stop the oil spill. Soon, they'll be failing in 3D. This is The Colbert Report."	June 2	6070
Stephen talks about the Japanese national elections occurring in six weeks and shows the campaign process with the help of several Japanese game show clips. Featured a reenactment of one of the clips using mice and a block of cheese.
723	"None"	Liam McCormick, Vampire Weekend	"Good thing there's no umpire here to ruin my perfect show. This is The Colbert Report."	June 3	6071
An update on the BP oil spill and an endorsement of the nuclear option.
724	"None"	James Carville, Jonathan Alter	"The new iPhone was announced today! It only has one major flaw: I don't have one! This is The Colbert Report."	June 7	6072
Using the word "Bing" earns a $2500 donation to charity, fighting the effects of the gulf oil spill, included a short interview with James Carville, and a mock beatdown of (mock) BP CEO Tony Hayward.
725	"P.R.-mageddon"	Mark Frauenfelder	None	June 8	6073
The first segment features a short clip from the 1993 music video for "Whoomp! (There It Is)" which features someone who looks remarkably like Barack Obama. First usage of "The Word" segment in June.
726	"None"	Michael Oren, Sam Nunn	None	June 9	6074
Stephen talks about Helen Thomas and her comments regarding Israel for which she was "forced into retirement". He also discusses said conflict in Israel. Featured a bonus interview with Michael Oren, Israeli Ambassador to the United States, which was triggered from a "Formidable Opponent" segment.
727	"None"	Marc Fisher, Mark Starr, Alan Bean	None	June 10	6075
A further update on the BP oil spill and the status of their stock, which by this episode has lost $82 billion, Lord Tebbit is quoted criticizing Obama's administration, and Marc Fisher debates soccer with Mark Starr. Alan Bean shows Stephen some of his moon paintings in the interview segment.
728	"None"	Stephen Prothero	"Free Wi-Fi is coming to Starbucks! Great news for people who can't afford Wi-Fi because they pay $6 for coffee at Starbucks. This is The Colbert Report. BANG!"	June 14	6076
729	"None"	Hanna Rosin, Carl Safina	"Brazil defeats North Korea in the World Cup; I guess we know who they're nuking first. This is The Colbert Report."	June 15	6077
Stephen criticizes lesbian parents for raising good children and encourages them to instead raise troubled teenagers like everyone else. Includes a bonus interview with Hanna Rosin, author of "The End of Men", an article in The Atlantic.
730	"$tay the Cour$e"	Devo	"And now, the five-day forecast: Thursday, Friday, Saturday, Sunday, Monday. This is The Colbert Report."	June 16	6078
731	"None"	Bob Inglis, David Mamet	None	June 17	6079
732	"None"	Steve Lindsey, Wes Moore	None	June 21	6080
733	"None"	Gloria Steinem	None	June 22	6081
Included a segment on the firing of Gen Stanley McChrystal in which Colbert implied that McChrystal had covered up the circumstances of Pat Tillman's death and also leaked a classified report to try to force President Obama's hand.
734	"None"	Father Guido Sarducci, Tim Westergren	"A 5.5 magnitude earthquake hits Canada. Even their earthquakes are bland. This is The Colbert Report."	June 23	6082
735	"Who War it Best?"	Michael Specter	"The longest tennis match ever ended today. That's funny: I thought every tennis match was the longest ever. This is The Colbert Report."	June 24	6083
736	"None"	Michael Hastings, John Waters	None	June 28	6084
737	"None"	Mike D'Antoni, Julian Castro	"I've got butterflies in my stomach because I ate a cocoon quesadilla. This is The Colbert Report."	June 29	6085
738	"None"	Nicholas G. Carr	None	June 30	6086

=== July ===
The Colbert Report broadcast no new episodes from 12 to 23 Jul 2010 due to a scheduled break. This coincided with a similar two week break for The Daily Show.

|- |- |- |- |- |- |- |-

No.	"The Wørd"	Guest(s)	Introductory phrase	Original release date	Prod. code
739	"None"	Manny Howard	"It's the 4th of July weekend, or as I call it: exploding Christmas. This is The Colbert Report."	July 1	6087
740	"None"	Cindy Cohn, Paul Krugman, Michio Kaku	None	July 5	6088
Stephen is sick. Throughout the duration of the show, he sits in a plush leather chair wearing a bathrobe, bunny slippers, and a blanket.
741	"The White Stuff"	Garret Keizer	"Good news, nation! Either I no longer have a fever, or the heatwave has matched my internal temperature. This is The Colbert Report."	July 6	6089
742	"None"	Steve Carell	"It was just a dream... This is The Colbert Report. NOOO!"	July 7	6090
743	"None"	Ilya Shapiro, Jackie Hilly, Arturo Rodriguez	"She sells seashells by the seashore...and I bet she qualifies for a claim against BP. This is The Colbert Report."	July 8	6091
Stephen discusses the Candwich (the canned sandwich), the "recent breakthrough in the field of sandwich."
744	"None"	Hephzibah Anderson	"Russia has elected its first black official. Shame on you, Russia! They prefer to be called African-Americans. This is The Colbert Report."	July 26	6092
Quotes: "Do you think that men put pressure on women to have sex without emotion?" - Colbert to guest [Yes] "What about the pressure that women put on men to have emotion without sex?...Maybe we don't feel like having emotions *tonight* honey...I don't have a heart *tonight.*
745	"None"	Tom Blanton, Kevin Kline	"Chelsea Clinton is getting married and, despite Hillary's early lead, Obama has been elected mother of the bride. This is The Colbert Report."	July 27	6093
WikiLeaks scandal, interview with Tom Blanton, director of the National Security Archives, bit on how Dick Cheney now has no pulse, contest with Kevin Kline on who was better at representing Shakespearean characters with only facial expressions and a grunt.
746	"Ownership Society"	Elon Musk	None	July 28	6094
747	"None"	Andy Cohen	"Turns out a stitch in time does not save nine. I'd like to apologize to the nine people who drowned while I was crocheting. This is The Colbert Report!"	July 29	6095

=== August ===
|- |- |- |- |- |- |- |- |- |- |- |- |- |-

No.	"The Wørd"	Guest(s)	Introductory phrase	Original release date	Prod. code
748	"None"	Jimmy Cliff	"Newsweek has been sold to an investor for one dollar. Idiot, you can read it online for free. This is The Colbert Report."	August 2	6096
749	"None"	Barney Frank, Laura Ingraham	None	August 3	6097
750	"None"	Michael Posner	None	August 4	6098
751	"None"	Savion Glover	"BP started pumping cement into the well. Get ready for a huge cement spill. This is The Colbert Report."	August 5	6099
752	"None"	Akhil Amar, Dylan Ratigan	"Van Halen will release a new album with David Lee Roth. At their age, 'Hot for Teacher' is now creepy from the other side. This is The Colbert Report."	August 10	6100
753	"None"	David Finkel	None	August 11	6101
"First of all, I just want to say Happy Birthday to everybody. Let's just get that out of the way. Check. Done. That covers everybody for the next year."
754	"Weapon of Mass Construction"	Chuck Close	"Tomorrow is Friday the 13th. Bad luck for you, I don't do shows on Fridays. This is The Colbert Report."	August 12	6102
755	"None"	Richard A. Clarke, John Fetterman	None	August 16	6103
John Vines was quoted as saying that the group of agencies was in total, not overseen by anyone and thus cannot be assessed for efficacy; Richard Clarke gave a short interview, in which he claimed that the number of agencies is now too large, and that they were getting in each others way and failing to protect the US.
756	"None"	J. Patrick Boyle, Barry Levine	"The Ninth District Appeals Court has put a hold on gay marriage. Or as they said in the ruling: 'Sike Sike!' This is The Colbert Report."	August 17	6104
757	"Borderline Personality"	Thomas French	"Wired magazine says the Internet is dead. I hope the Lolcats made it out alive. This is The Colbert Report."	August 18	6105
758	"What If You Threw A Peace And Nobody Came?"	Michael Blum, Jon Krakauer	"Three million eggs have been recalled. I'd hate to be guy in charge of getting them back into that chicken. This is The Colbert Report."	August 19	6106
759	"Losing His Religion"	Leslie Kean	None	August 23	6107
760	"Control-Self-Delete"	Jeffrey Goldberg	"Ladies, Tiger Woods' divorce is final, which means he's dating less. This is The Colbert Report."	August 24	6108
Noting a recent story The Daily Show did regarding the Fox News story on "tracing the money" behind the 9/11 mosque, Stephen said, "To stop terrorism, we must stop watching Fox News." Regarding the Colbert Report Terror Bunker 5200: "The terror bunker...where fear craps its pants."
761	"None"	Andrew Hacker, Heidi Cullen	None	August 25	6109
762	"None"	Richard Engel	"Toyota recalls the Matrix. Personally, I think they should have recalled the sequels: they sucked. This is The Colbert Report."	August 26	6110

=== September ===
|- |- |- |- |- |- |- |- |- |- |- |- |- |-

No.	"The Wørd"	Guest(s)	Introductory phrase	Original release date	Prod. code
763	"None"	Anthony Romero	"It's the first day of school. Guys, do not hit on your teacher. Play it cool, let her come to you. This is The Colbert Report."	September 7	6111
764	"Over & Out"	Raymond T. Odierno, Joe Biden	(shooting a 'C' with a tank gun into a wall) "Jay Leno doesn't have one of these. This is The Colbert Report."	September 8	6112
765	"None"	Jim Webb, Brent Cummings, Josh Bleill, John Legend	None	September 9	6113
766	"None"	Lisa Birnbach	"Violent crime is down for the third year in a row. I say that calls for a celebratory riot. This is The Colbert Report."	September 13	6114
767	"Mutually Assured Coercion"	Sean Wilentz	"Oprah is taking her audience to Australia, so I'm taking my studio to the Outback Steakhouse. This is your treat: Colbert Report."	September 14	6115
768	"None"	Saul Griffith	"The new Halo game was released today, so I assume you're not watching this. This is The Colbert Report."	September 15	6116
769	"None"	Jerome Goddard, Lawrence O'Donnell	None	September 16	6117
770	"None"	Pavement	"A man with no arms and no legs has swum the English Channel. Wow, is he gonna be pissed when he finds out about the Channel Tunnel train. This is The Colbert Report."	September 20	6118
771	"None"	Mark Shriver, Eric Schmidt	"All your favorite shows are back this week. But remember, I'm the only one who never left you. This is The Colbert Report."	September 21	6119
772	"The More You No"	Guillermo del Toro	"Hey FOX, I would make a great American Idol judge: American Idol should be canceled. See, how well I judged it? This is The Colbert Report."	September 22	6120
773	"None"	Oscar Goodman	"Facebook founder Mark Zuckerberg gives 100 million dollars to the Newark school system. So kids, support your school by spending all day on Facebook. This is The Colbert Report."	September 23	6121
774	"Army of Mum"	Ken Burns	"It's Banned Book Week. Why not sit down and redact a story with your child. This is The Colbert Report."	September 27	6122
775	"None"	Paul Begala, Ross Douthat	"I always run on the balls of my feet. That's right, even my feet have balls. This is The Colbert Report."	September 28	6123
776	"Original Spin"	Steven Rattner	None	September 29	6124
777	"None"	Aaron Sorkin	"It's the fourth day of Banned Books Week. Or the third, I don't know, the first banned book was my day planner. This is The Colbert Report."	September 30	6125

=== October ===
|- |- |- |- |- |- |- |- |- |- |-

No.	"The Wørd"	Guest(s)	Introductory phrase	Original release date	Prod. code
778	"It's A Small-Minded World"	Eugene Robinson	"The Postal Service is gonna be charging more for floppy bulk mail: bad news for anyone who signed up for my jelly fish of the month club. This is The Colbert Report."	October 4	6126
779	"None"	John Burnett, Leon Botstein	"You say 'potato', I also say 'potato'. This is America: no accents. This is The Colbert Report."	October 5	6127
780	"None"	Mavis Staples, Jeff Tweedy	"Michael Steele doesn't know the minimum wage. Which means they're paying him more than he's worth. This is The Colbert Report."	October 6	6128
781	"None"	Joseph Califano, Gary Johnson, Davis Guggenheim	None	October 7	6129
782	"None"	Robert Reich	"The Chilean Miners are about to be freed, so let me be the first to say: Get back to work! This is The Colbert Report."	October 11	6130
783	"None"	Brendan Steinhauser	"McDonald's is now offering wedding services. So there's no longer a lag between getting married and letting yourself go. This is The Colbert Report."	October 12	6131
784	"None"	Austan Goolsbee	"Apple has patented anti-sexting technology. Brett Favre, you're gonna want a Droid. This is The Colbert Report."	October 13	6132
785	"None"	Bill Bryson	None	October 14	6133
786	"Midterm Erection"	Nicholas Negroponte	None	October 25	6134
787	"Invisible Inc."	Garry Wills	"Joy Behar says Sharron Angle is going to hell. Funny, I didn't know Angle was going on The View. This is The Colbert Report."	October 26	6135
788	"None"	Apolo Anton Ohno	"You can lead a horse to water, but why not ride it there? You've got a horse! This is The Colbert Report."	October 27	6136
789	"None"	Maira Kalman	None	October 28	6137

=== November ===
|- |- |- |- |- |- |- |- |- |- |- |- |-

No.	"The Wørd"	Guest(s)	Introductory phrase	Original release date	Prod. code
790	"None"	Jonathan Alter	"Fear is still alive! Listen! Listen! I can hear fear's beating heart! This is The Colbert Report!"	November 01	6138
791	"None"	David Frum, Katrina vanden Heuvel	"Shaka brah! This is The Colbert Report!"	November 02	6139
792	"None"	Doris Kearns Goodwin	"Thanks to everyone that came to my rally and watched my live election show and an especial big thanks to those little pills I've been taking to keep me awake. This is The Colbert Report."	November 03	6140
793	"None"	Elvis Costello	"George Bush admits to approving waterboarding. Hmmm, I wonder how they got him to admit that? This is The Colbert Report."	November 04	6141
794	"Nothingness"	Reza Aslan	None	November 08	6142
795	"None"	Abbe Lowell, Cee Lo Green	None	November 09	6143
796	"None"	Beri Fox, Martha Stewart	None	November 10	6144
797	"None"	Quincy Jones	"Wal-Mart is offering free online shipping. Now you can put a mom-and-pop store out of business anywhere in the country. This is The Colbert Report."	November 11	6145
798	"None"	Jeffrey Goldberg, David Stern	None	November 15	6146
799	"None"	John Legend	"Little known fact: when they made the Tower of Babel, they also made the doggie steps of Babel - that's why we can't understand dogs. This is The Colbert Report."	November 16	6147
800	"None"	Ian Frazier	"They've broken ground on the George W. Bush presidential library. Next, they're gonna amass its collection of book. This is The Colbert Report."	November 17	6148
801	"None"	Salvatore Giunta	None	November 18	6149
802	"None"	Dan Savage	"I was born with a silver spoon in my mouth: it was a painful birth for my mom. This is The Colbert Report."	November 29	6150
803	"None"	James Rubin, Tom Vilsack	None	November 30	6151

=== December ===
|- |- |- |- |- |- |- |- |-

No.	"The Wørd"	Guest(s)	Introductory phrase	Original release date	Prod. code
804	"None"	Jake Tapper, Michelle Rhee	None	December 01	6152
805	"The Great White Wail"	David Stockman	"NASA scientists have discovered a new form of life. Unfortunately, it won't date them either. This is The Colbert Report."	December 02	6153
806	"Unrequited Gov"	Garry Trudeau	None	December 06	6154
807	"None"	Julie Nixon Eisenhower and David Eisenhower	None	December 07	6155
808	"None"	Brent Glass, Steve Martin, Frank Stella, Shepard Fairey, Andres Serrano	None	December 08	6156
809	"None"	Daniel Ellsberg, William Wegman, Julie Taymor	None	December 09	6157
810	"Swift Payment"	Patti Smith	"The Minnesota Vikings' stadium roof collapsed...and it still has a better shot at the Super Bowl than the team. This is The Colbert Report."	December 13	6158
811	"None"	David Boies, Biz Stone, Stephen Sondheim	None	December 14	6159
812	"None"	Omar Wasow, Laird Hamilton	"TIME's person of the year is Mark Zuckerberg. Sorry, Julian Assange, I guess you didn't violate enough people's privacy. This is The Colbert Report."	December 15	6160
813	"None"	Amy Sedaris, Paul Simon	None	December 16	6161

== Notes ==
^a Hans Beinholtz is a fictional character played by Erik Frandsen.
