= Wikipedia in culture =

References to and discussion about Wikipedia

References to Wikipedia in popular culture have been widespread. Many parody Wikipedia's openness, with individuals vandalizing or modifying articles in nonconstructive ways. Others feature individuals using Wikipedia as a reference work, or positively comparing their intelligence to Wikipedia. In some cases, Wikipedia is not used as an encyclopedia at all, but instead serves more as a character trait or even as a game, such as Wikiracing. Wikipedia has also become culturally significant with many individuals seeing the presence of their own Wikipedia entry as a status symbol.

== In the arts and entertainment ==
=== In art ===
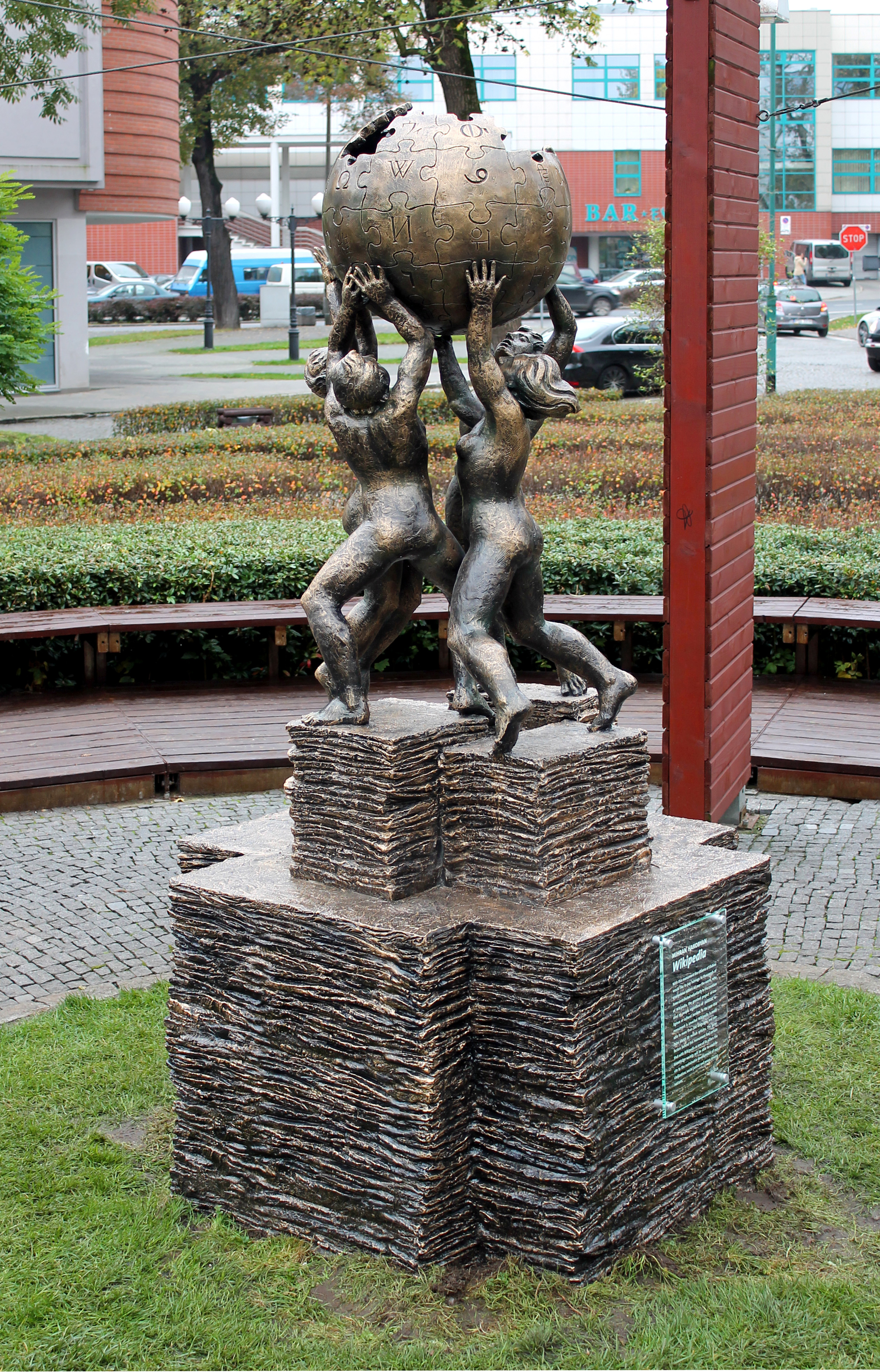
Wikipedia Monument in Słubice, Poland

The Wikipedia Monument, located in Słubice, Poland, is a statue designed by Armenian sculptor Mihran Hakobyan honoring Wikipedia contributors. It was unveiled in Frankfurt Square (Plac Frankfurcki) on 22 October 2014 in a ceremony that included representatives from both local Wikimedia chapters and the Wikimedia Foundation.

=== In music ===
A scene in the 2006 music video for the "Weird Al" Yankovic song "White & Nerdy" shows Yankovic vandalizing the Wikipedia page for Atlantic Records, replacing it with the words "YOU SUCK!", referencing recent trouble he had had with the company in getting permissions.

Ukrainian composer Andriy Bondarenko wrote a musical piece, "Anthem of Wikipedia", which was performed in a concert devoted to the 15th anniversary of Wikipedia in Kyiv in 2016.

=== In webcomics ===
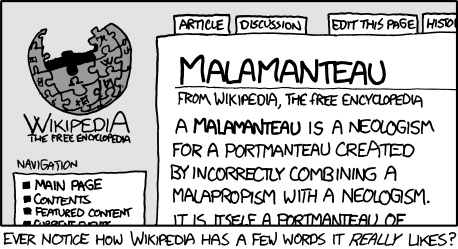
"Malamanteau", parodying Wikipedia's writing style

References to Wikipedia have been made several times in the webcomic xkcd. A facsimile of a made-up Wikipedia entry for "malamanteau" (a stunt word created by Munroe to poke fun at Wikipedia's writing style) provoked a controversy.

=== In Internet culture ===
During the Russo-Ukrainian war, a meme titled Battle of Techno House 2022, featuring footage of a Russian soldier's failed effort at opening a door, was reposted millions of times. Media coverage included discussion of a (later removed) Wikipedia page for the incident, which lampooned the event by using Wikipedia formatting generally used only for actual battles.

Annie Rauwerda's Depths of Wikipedia social media accounts document bizarre or otherwise humorous items on Wikipedia, later expanded into a live comedy show.

=== In fiction ===
In drama-film Tár (2022), Lydia Tár discovers her Wikipedia page being anonymously vandalized, contributing to her mental health decline.

The 2024 novel The Editors, by Stephen Harrison, centers around editors of Infopendium, an online encyclopedia based on Wikipedia.

The 2025 novel The Expert of Subtle Revisions, whose cover is styled after a Wikipedia article, follows a historical mystery with clues scattered throughout Wikipedia edits and deleted articles.

== Stephen Colbert incident ==
In a July 2006 episode of the satirical comedy The Colbert Report, Stephen Colbert announced the neologism "wikiality", a portmanteau of the words Wiki and reality, for his segment "The Wørd". Colbert defined wikiality as "truth by consensus" (rather than fact), modeled after the approval-by-consensus format of Wikipedia. He ironically praised Wikipedia for following his philosophy of truthiness in which intuition and consensus is a better reflection of reality than fact:

You see, any user can change any entry, and if enough other users agree with them, it becomes true. ... If only the entire body of human knowledge worked this way. And it can, thanks to tonight's word: Wikiality. Now, folks, I'm no fan of reality, and I'm no fan of encyclopedias. I've said it before. Who is Britannica to tell me that George Washington had slaves? If I want to say he didn't, that's my right. And now, thanks to Wikipedia, it's also a fact. We should apply these principles to all information. All we need to do is convince a majority of people that some factoid is true. ... What we're doing is bringing democracy to knowledge.

Colbert suggested that viewers change the elephant page to state that the number of African elephants has tripled in the last six months. The suggestion resulted in numerous incorrect changes to Wikipedia articles related to elephants and Africa. (Note: "Loxodonta", "African forest elephant", "African bush elephant", "Pachydermata", "Babar the Elephant", "Elephant", "Oregon", "George Washington", "Latchkey kid", "Serial killer", "Hitler", "The Colbert Report" and "Stephen Colbert" are/were temporarily protected. "Mûmak" (formerly at "Oliphaunt") has also been vandalized.) (Note: Wikipedia administrators subsequently restricted edits to the pages by anonymous and newly created user accounts.) Colbert went on to type on a laptop facing away from the camera, claiming to be making the edits to the pages himself. Because initial edits to Wikipedia corresponding to these claimed "facts" were made by a user named Stephencolbert, many believe Colbert himself vandalized several Wikipedia pages at the time he was encouraging other users to do the same. Whether the account was Stephen Colbert himself or someone posing as him, it was blocked from Wikipedia indefinitely. (Note: Wikipedia blocked the account for violating Wikipedia's username policies (which state that using the names of celebrities as login names without permission is inappropriate), not for the vandalism, as believed.)

== Contexts ==
Wikipedia is not always referenced in the same way. The ways described below are some of the ways it has been mentioned.

=== Citations of Wikipedia in culture ===
- People who are known to have used or recommended Wikipedia as a reference source include comedian Rosie O'Donnell and Rutgers University sociology professor Ted Goertzel.
- Various people including Sir Ian McKellen, Nicolas Cage, and Marcus Brigstocke have criticized or commented about Wikipedia's articles about themselves.

=== In politics ===
- In June 2011, Wikipedia received attention for attempts by editors to change the "Paul Revere" article to fit Sarah Palin's accounting of events during a campaign bus tour. The New York Times reported that the article "had half a million page views" by June 10, and "after all the attention and arguments, the article is now much longer ... and much better sourced ... than before Palin's remarks."
- In a speech given on October 28, 2013, to support Ken Cuccinelli for the candidacy of the governor of Virginia, Senator Rand Paul appeared to include close paraphrasing of the Wikipedia entry on the 1997 film Gattaca (version prior to speech) in his comments on eugenics, as noted by MSNBC host Rachel Maddow.
- In April 2015, The Guardian reported claims that Grant Shapps, then-Chairman of the Conservative Party, or a person working under his orders, had edited Wikipedia pages about Shapps and other members of the British Parliament during the runup to the 2015 election, to which Shapps had denied involvement.
- In October 2018, Jackson A. Cosko, a former staff member for US Senator Maggie Hassan, edited Wikipedia to dox several Congresspersons after being fired. Republican Senators Lindsey Graham, Orrin G. Hatch, Mitch McConnell, and Mike Lee had their personal addresses, cell phone numbers, and email addresses inserted into their respective Wikipedia pages. The Senators were targeted for the role they played as Republican members of the Senate Judiciary Committee during the contentious Supreme Court nomination hearings of Brett Kavanaugh. Cosko pleaded guilty in April 2019 and on 19 June 2019 was sentenced to four years in federal prison on five charges related to the event.
- In February 2022, journalists at The Independent found that text from Wikipedia articles on Constantinople and the list of largest cities throughout history had been lifted by civil servants from the UK's Department for Levelling Up, Housing and Communities and placed verbatim into the government's Levelling Up White Paper.

=== Wikipedia as comedic material ===
- Wikipedia is parodied at several websites, including Uncyclopedia and Encyclopedia Dramatica.
- In May 2006, British chat show host Paul O'Grady received an inquiry from a viewer regarding information given on his Wikipedia page, to which he responded, "Wikipedia? Sounds like a skin disease."
- Comedian Zach Galifianakis claimed to look himself up on Wikipedia in an interview with The Badger Herald, stating about himself, "...I'm looking at Wikipedia right now. Half Greek, half redneck, around 6-foot-4. And that's about it... The 6-foot-4 thing may be a little bit off. Actually, it's 4-foot-6."

=== General information source ===
- Slate magazine compared Wikipedia to the fictional device The Hitchhiker's Guide to the Galaxy from the series of the same name by Douglas Adams. "The parallels between The Hitchhiker's Guide (as found in Adams' original BBC radio series and novels) and Wikipedia are so striking, it's a wonder that the author's rabid fans don't think he invented time travel. Since its editor was perennially out to lunch, the Guide was amended 'by any passing stranger who happened to wander into the empty offices on an afternoon and saw something worth doing.' This anonymous group effort ends up outselling Encyclopedia Galactica even though 'it has many omissions and contains much that is apocryphal, or at least wildly inaccurate.'" This comparison of rivaling texts resembles the mainstream comparisons between Wikipedia and professional encyclopedias.
- In the post-apocalyptic world of Station Eleven (2021), a young boy plans to download Wikipedia to benefit his community of survivors before they lose access to the Internet.

=== As the basis of games ===
Wikiracing is a game in which players attempt to get from one Wikipedia page to another using only the links on each page. By 2010, 20,000 to 30,000 games had been played on a dedicated website.

Redactle is a game in which the player must identify a Wikipedia article (chosen from the 10,000 vital articles) after it appears with most of its words redacted. Prepositions, articles, the verb "to be", punctuation and word lengths are shown. Players guess words, which are revealed if present in the article. As of June 2024, there had been over 800 daily games.

Catfishing is a game created in 2026 in which the player must identify each of ten Wikipedia articles from only its list of categories.

== Criticism ==
=== Claims of negative impact of Wikipedia on culture ===
Andrew Keen's 2007 book The Cult of the Amateur: How Today's Internet Is Killing Our Culture asserted the proliferation of user-generated content on Wikipedia obscured and devalued traditional, higher-quality information outlets.

== See also ==
- Truth in Numbers? Everything, According to Wikipedia, 2010 documentary
