= Barry Levine =

Barry Levine may refer to:

- Barry B. Levine (1941–2020), American professor of sociology
- Barry Levine (journalist), American journalist
