= List of The Colbert Report episodes (2009) =

- No. of episodes: 161

Release
- Original network: Comedy Central

Season chronology
- ← Previous; 2008 episodes Next → 2010 episodes

This is a list of episodes for The Colbert Report in 2009.

== 2009 ==
=== January ===
No.	"The Wørd"	Guest(s)	Introductory phrase	Original release date	Prod. code
492	"None"	Alan Colmes, John King	None	January 5	5001
Colbert announces that Alan Colmes is joining him as co-host on his new show, Colbert and Colmes. They then discuss Roland Burris's appointment to the Senate, as well as Al Franken winning his Senate race in Minnesota. Colbert then premieres Chapter 3 in the Tek Jansen series. He then interviews John King about the media and politics. Finally, Colbert gets angry with Colmes and fires him.
493	"None"	David Leonhardt, Matt Miller	None	January 6	5002
Colbert begins with the Bernard Madoff scandal and interviews David Leonhardt about it. In "Better Know a District," he profiles Utah's 3rd congressional district and speaks with its congressman, Jason Chaffetz. Finally, Colbert interviews Matt Miller about his book, The Tyranny of Dead Ideas. The phrase next to Colbert in the opening credits changes to "COLMES-FREE SINCE 2009".
494	"Statute of Liberty"	Benicio del Toro	"It's the year of the Ox. Good. I was getting sick of eating Rat. This is The Colbert Report."	January 7	5003
Colbert discusses nominations to President-elect Obama's Cabinet, including Bill Richardson, Leon Panetta and Sanjay Gupta. He then worries that Obama will seek to overturn Ledbetter v. Goodyear Tire & Rubber Co. In "Tip of the Hat, Wag of the Finger," he wags his finger at Chinese bootleggers, tips his hat to the EPA, wags his finger at scientists studying drug addiction by putting cocaine on bees and tips his hat to this year's honey. Finally, Colbert interviews Benicio del Toro about his new film, Che.
495	"None"	Lawrence Lessig	(singing) "The hills are alive with the sound of WOLVES! RUN, MARIA! RUN! This is The Colbert Report."	January 8	5004
Colbert mentions The New York Times beginning to run ads on its front page. He then talks about Roland Burris' appointment to the Senate. He introduces a new segment, "Yahweh or No Way," discussing Burris, Pat Robertson and Neale Donald Walsch. He then talks about Jason Chaffetz challenging him to a leg wrestling rematch. Finally, Colbert interviews Lawrence Lessig about copyrights and his book, Remix.
496	"Sweet Smell of Success"	Anthony Romero	"Fool me once, shame on you. Fool me twice, shame you on again. I am shameless. This is The Colbert Report."	January 12	5005
Colbert briefly mentions last night's Golden Globe Awards. He then discusses President Bush's final press conference, which leads to a report of a study that found women are attracted to men who appear confident. Next, he gives an update on his eagle "son," Stephen Jr. Finally, Colbert interviews Anthony Romero about Guantanamo Bay and the Bush presidency.
497	"None"	Niall Ferguson	"A house divided against itself cannot stand, but it's worth squat in this market anyway. This is The Colbert Report."	January 13	5006
Colbert briefly mentions Treasury Secretary-designate Timothy Geithner not paying some of his taxes. In the "Cold War Update," he talks about Russia and Cuba. He then discusses some Great Britain people that are eating squirrels and puts "Limey Squirrel Eaters" "On Notice." Finally, Colbert interviews Niall Ferguson about economics.
498	"None"	Alan Khazei	"Hey, I don't pay my taxes; why can't I be Treasury Secretary? This is The Colbert Report."	January 14	5007
Iranians burning pictures of Obama, over-marketing of Obama, interview with P. K. Winsome, Milky Way Galaxy has been found to be about the same size as the Andromeda Galaxy, national service.
499	"None"	David Gregory, Shepard Fairey	"It's my way or the tollway. No free rides. This is The Colbert Report."	January 15	5008
Colbert discusses the relationship between the media and President Bush and interviews David Gregory about it. In "Tip of the Hat, Wag of the Finger," he wags his finger at the New York Mets, tips his hat to PETA and wags his finger at Clearwater, Florida police. Finally, Colbert interviews Shepard Fairey about designing the Barack Obama "HOPE" poster.
500	"Sacrifice"	Frank Rich, Christine Ebersole	"Just 12 more hours until all those Bush countdown clocks explode. YOU FOOLS! This is The Colbert Report."	January 19	5009
Colbert cheers for his 500th episode. In honor of Martin Luther King Jr. Day, he introduces the day's new mascot, Dreamy. He then discusses President Bush's legacy. Next, he interviews Frank Rich about Bush's presidency. Christine Ebersole then sings a farewell tribute to President Bush and his supporters. Finally, Colbert talks about the boiling frog story and places a frog skeleton on his shelf in honor of President Bush's last day.
501	"None"	Jabari Asim	None (show begins with opening sequence)	January 20	5010
Colbert discusses the inauguration of Barack Obama and speaks with P.K. Winsome. In "Stephen's Sound Advice," he tells Obama how to appear more "Lincoln-ish." Next, he interviews Jabari Asim about his book, What Obama Means. Finally, Colbert decides he is black because, along with other African Americans, Obama's inauguration meant something to him.
502	"None"	Elizabeth Alexander	"I, Stephen Colbert, promise...faithfully to...I mean, faithfully prom...f--k it, Colbert Report."	January 21	5011
Colbert talks about Chief Justice Roberts incorrectly reciting President Obama's oath of office. He then discusses the 2012 presidential election and speaks with Chuck Todd via satellite about the Republican front-runners' chances. Next, he shows a video he created using a fan-made audio remix of his interview with Lawrence Lessig. Finally, Colbert interviews Elizabeth Alexander about poetry.
503	"None"	Jon Meacham	"Congratulations to The Curious Case of Benjamin Button on its 13 Oscar nominations. See? Americans do support torture. This is The Colbert Report."	January 22	5012
Colbert briefly comments on Caroline Kennedy withdrawing from consideration for Hillary Clinton's former Senate seat. He then talks about President Obama and Chief Justice Roberts redoing the oath of office. In "Un-American News: President Obama Edition," he discusses the world's reaction to Obama's inauguration. Next, in "Better Know a Lobby," he speaks with Benjamin Jealous about the NAACP. Finally, Colbert interviews Jon Meacham about Andrew Jackson and his book, American Lion.
504	"None"	Chris Mooney, Ed Young	"Hey, Iceland! You can't make a Molotov cocktail with yogurt. This is The Colbert Report."	January 26	5013
Colbert discusses President Obama's decision to close Guantanamo Bay and secret CIA prisons, which causes him to release his prisoner. He then interviews Chris Mooney on the politics of science policy. In "Tip of the Hat, Wag of the Finger," he tips his hat to Roe v. Wade, wags his finger at Indian marriage rituals and tips his hat to John Yarmuth. Finally, Colbert interviews Ed Young about sex and marriage.
505	"None"	Philippe Petit	"America, here is my stimulus package: (removes glasses) Hello, ladies. This is The Colbert Report."	January 27	5014
Colbert talks about President Obama's interview on Al Arabiya. In "Cheating Death with Dr. Stephen T. Colbert, D.F.A.," he discusses lung health, weight loss and corporate health. He then "interviews" Bill O'Reilly about Caroline Kennedy withdrawing from consideration for Hillary Clinton's former Senate seat using clip editing. Next, Colbert interviews Philippe Petit about his experiences as a tightrope walker. Finally, Colbert's prisoner returns and he reluctantly sets him free again.
506	"None"	Denis Dutton	"What do I have to do to get nominated for an Oscar, make a movie? This is The Colbert Report."	January 28	5015
Colbert discusses the Great Recession, which causes him concern about the decreased supply of chicken wings. In a new segment, Better Know a Beatle, he speaks with Paul McCartney about The Beatles and his new album, Electric Arguments. Finally, Colbert interviews Denis Dutton about art appreciation and evolution.
507	"The Audacity of Nope"	John Podesta	"Scotch Tape, either change your name or get me drunk. I nearly choked last night. This is The Colbert Report."	January 29	5016
Colbert briefly mentions Illinois Governor Rod Blagojevich being impeached. He then praises all Republicans in the U.S. House for voting against the economic stimulus package. In "Stephen Colbert's Sport Report", he discusses Super Bowl XLIII, its commercials and the buffalo wings shortage. He then speaks with Richard Lobb about the shortage. Finally, Colbert interviews John Podesta about President Obama's transition and progressivism.

=== February ===
No.	"The Wørd"	Guest(s)	Introductory phrase	Original release date	Prod. code
508	"None"	Dan Zaccagnino	"It's Groundhog Day. Gentlemen, start your groundhogs. This is The Colbert Report."	February 2	5017
Colbert talks about the Ledbetter law being passed. In "It Could Be Worse," he discusses the government of Iceland's collapse. In "Nailed 'Em," Colbert profiles a man who was arrested at Penn Station for taking pictures of Amtrak trains. Finally, he interviews Dan Zaccagnino about his website and remixing previous clips of Colbert.
509	"Army of One"	Henry Louis Gates Jr.	"Hey, Lady Liberty! Isn't it time you settled down and found yourself a man?" (straightens tie) "This is The Colbert Report."	February 3	5018
Colbert talks about Tom Daschle withdrawing from consideration for Secretary of Health and Human Services. He then claims Michael Steele's selection as chairman of the Republican National Committee is irrelevant because Rush Limbaugh is the real leader of the Republican Party. In "Colbert Platinum: Ass-Covering Edition," he talks about John Thain, Richard Fuld and Marcus Schrenker. Finally, Colbert interviews Henry Louis Gates Jr. about Abraham Lincoln.
510	"None"	Steve Martin	"Here's a brain teaser for ya: your brain is ugly. This is The Colbert Report."	February 4	5019
Colbert berates Steve Martin for walking through his line of sight. In "Yahweh or No Way," he talks about Super Bowl XLIII, Fred Milani and Pope Benedict XVI. In "Who's Not Honoring Me Now," Colbert complains he hasn't won a Newbery Medal or the Bocuse d'Or, but feels good about his chances to win a Grammy Award. Finally, he interviews Steve Martin about his career and challenges him to a "read-off" and a "'Dueling Banjos'-off." The phrase next to Colbert in the opening credits changes to "SEVEN-INCH GANGLY WRENCH".
511	"None"	James Surowiecki, Jonah Lehrer	"Don't put off until tomorrow what your team of personal assistants can do today. This is The Colbert Report."	February 5	5020
Colbert announces that UC Santa Cruz's marine lab named an elephant seal after him. He then discusses the contents of the economic stimulus bill and speaks with James Surowiecki about them. He then names the Boy Scouts of America the "Alpha Dog of the Week." Finally, Colbert interviews Jonah Lehrer about how humans make decisions. The phrase next to Colbert in the opening credits changes to "JUICE IT!"
512	"None"	TV on the Radio	"It's official: highway patrolmen are not susceptible to the Jedi mind trick. This is The Colbert Report."	February 9	5021
Colbert claims Michael Steele should be appointed "word czar." The "ThreatDown:" 5. Michael Phelps! 4. Bill Gates! 3. Japanese Sewage! 2. Gay Divorce! 1. Shadow God! He then finds out he lost the Grammy Award for Best Spoken Word Album to Al Gore. Colbert then interviews TV on the Radio about their career. Finally, the band performs "Dancing Choose" from their latest album, Dear Science.
513	"Loyal Opposition"	Robert Ballard	"Let's agree to disagree with anybody who disagrees with me. This is The Colbert Report."	February 10	5022
Colbert gets enraged over the cover of The Atlantic and the new Visa Black. He then discusses Republican Congressman Pete Sessions' claim that "insurgency may be required" to fight the Democrats. In "Shout Out!," Colbert praises Gene E. Robinson, John Sununu and one of his former security guards. Finally, he interviews Robert Ballard about his work in underwater archaeology.
514	"None"	Steven Pinker	"I'll never use steroids to get stronger; I just use them for the 'roid rage.' This is The Colbert Report."	February 11	5023
Colbert complains that he didn't win the Westminster Kennel Club Dog Show. He then discusses a bill that would give the District of Columbia voting rights and speaks with Eleanor Holmes Norton about it. He then talks about a segment on Glenn Beck's show in which Beck's eyes were featured in close-up, which causes Colbert to show his colonoscopy. Finally, he interviews Steven Pinker about the human genome.
515	"None"	David Ross, Ed Colbert, Adam Gopnik	None (show begins with opening sequence)	February 12	5024
Colbert wishes Abraham Lincoln a happy 200th birthday. He then discusses Shepard Fairey suing the AP over the Barack Obama "Hope" poster and interviews David Ross and his brother, Ed Colbert, about it. In "The DaColbert Code," he predicts who will win Oscars. Colbert then interviews Adam Gopnik about the similarities between Abraham Lincoln and Charles Darwin. Finally, he bids farewell to Conan O'Brien.
516	"None"	James Martin, Helen Fisher	"When life deals you lemons, make scrambled eggs. I make the worst scrambled eggs. This is The Colbert Report."	February 23	5025
Colbert discusses Mastermedia International urging people to pray for him today and prays for himself. He then talks about rising church attendance due to the Great Recession and speaks with James Martin about it. After testing his "moral dimension," he proclaims "The DaColbert Code" went 5-for-5 in predicting the Oscars. Finally, Colbert interviews Helen Fisher about matchmaking.
517	"None"	Cliff Sloan	None (show begins with opening sequence)	February 24	5026
Colbert celebrates Mardi Gras. He then reacts to the Dow Jones Industrial Average reaching its lowest level since 1997. In "Stephen Colbert's Bears & Balls," he discusses Sbarro, Six Flags and Muzak. In "Nailed 'Em," he profiles a man who was arrested for sharing a buffet. Finally, Colbert interviews Cliff Sloan about his new book, The Great Decision.
518	"Ablacknophobia"	John Fetterman	"It's Ash Wednesday. For Lent, I'm giving up listening. This is The Colbert Report."	February 25	5027
Colbert discusses Bobby Jindal's response to President Obama's address to Congress, as well as the address itself. He then talks about Eric Holder's speech on race. In "Tip of the Hat, Wag of the Finger," Colbert wags his finger at gorillas and Gandhi. Finally, he interviews John Fetterman about his city's financial troubles.
519	"The Swede Hereafter"	Kris Kristofferson	"Hey, Amazon! Congratulations on that new Kindle. Now we play the waiting game. This is The Colbert Report."	February 26	5028
Colbert talks about Claire McCaskill using Twitter during President Obama's congressional address. He then discusses Obama's tax plan and the potential nationalization of banks. Colbert then talks about Michael Steele wanting the Republican Party to become more "hip hop." Next, he interviews Kris Kristofferson about his career. Finally, Kristofferson performs "Help Me Make It Through the Night."

=== March ===
No.	"The Wørd"	Guest(s)	Introductory phrase	Original release date	Prod. code
520	"None"	David Byrne	None (show begins with opening sequence)	March 2	5029
Colbert briefly mentions New York's winter weather. He then talks about some people feeling cheated by Barack Obama commemorative coins and speaks with P.K. Winsome about his own commemorative plates. He then claims Michael Steele accepted his challenge for a "rap-off," but after Steele doesn't show up, he delivers a presentation called "The Rap Battle." Colbert then interviews David Byrne about his new album and career. Finally, Byrne performs "Life Is Long."
521	"Share The Wealth"	Mark Bittman	"Ever get the feeling 1.3 million people are watching you? This is The Colbert Report."	March 3	5030
Colbert talks about a report of a correlation between beer pong the spread of herpes and complains the CDC called the report a hoax. He then discusses President Obama's plan to raise taxes on the rich to pay for universal health care. Next, he talks about police in Columbia, SC offering a "Guns for Roses" exchange program. He then announces that NASA is letting people decide the name of a module on the International Space Station and urges people name it after him. Finally, he interviews Mark Bittman about "conscious eating."
522	"None"	Jack Jacobs, Stephen Moore, Carl Wilson	"Birds of a feather stick together, especially after they've flown into your glue trap. This is The Colbert Report."	March 4	5031
Colbert brags that his name is now ahead of Xenu in the vote to name a module on the International Space Station and claims that makes him Scientology's new galactic overlord. He then talks about "War Room," a segment on Glenn Beck's Fox News show. This leads to "Stephen Colbert's Doom Bunker," in which he speaks with Jack Jacobs and Stephen Moore about various doomsday scenarios. Finally, Colbert interviews Carl Wilson about his book, Let's Talk About Love.
523	"None"	Jim Cramer, Steven Berlin Johnson	"I retain all my vitamins because I am always steamed. This is The Colbert Report."	March 5	5032
Colbert briefly mentions President Obama installing a swing set outside the Oval Office. He then discusses various television pundits' reactions to the 2008 financial crisis and speaks with Jim Cramer about it. In "Tip of the Hat, Wag of the Finger," he tips his hat to Rush Limbaugh, theoretically wags his finger at Sean Hannity and wags his finger at God. Finally, Colbert interviews Steven Berlin Johnson about his book, The Invention of Air.
524	"Locked & Loathed"	Lisa Hannigan	(sitting in his underwear, eating a sandwich and reading Soap Opera Digest) "By the way, when's Daylight Savings Time start?"	March 9	5033
Colbert congratulates one of his writers on the birth of his son. He then discusses an online database that allows searches for concealed weapon permits in Tennessee. In "Better Know a District," he profiles Wyoming's at-large congressional district and speaks with its Congresswoman, Cynthia Lummis. Finally, Colbert briefly interviews Lisa Hannigan, who then performs her song, "I Don't Know."
525	"None"	William Gerstenmaier, Jay Keasling	"I don't sugarcoat the news; I drench it in high-fructose corn syrup. This is The Colbert Report."	March 10	5034
Colbert talks about Michael Steele's troubles within the Republican Party. He then urges people to keep voting for his name to be on a new module on the International Space Station and discusses India and Iran's space plans. He then speaks, via satellite, to William Gerstenmaier about the Kepler Mission. Next, Colbert worries his coffee intake has been causing hallucinations. Finally, he interviews Jay Keasling about engineering bacteria to produce fuel.
526	"Rand Illusion"	Howard Fineman	"Hey, Dr. Manhattan, where's your glowing blue medical degree? This is The Colbert Report."	March 11	5035
Colbert first discusses President Obama's inconsistency on earmarks in Congressional legislation. Then he talks about how Obama is planning to tax the wealthy to pay for government programs, and how Republicans are continuing to cite Atlas Shrugged, the infamous book by Ayn Rand. In the segment Cheating Death, Stephen talks about the Supreme Court ruling against a drug company, sweat, and designer babies. Finally, he interviews Howard Fineman about his book "The Thirteen American Arguments."
527	"None"	Simon Johnson, Peter Singer	"Bernie Madoff, here's some advice: on the first day of jail, find the biggest guy in the yard, and defraud him. This is The Colbert Report."	March 12	5036
528	"None"	Jonathan Chait, Neil Gaiman	"Hey, did you read today's London Financial Times? Then why are you watching this show? This is The Colbert Report."	March 16	5037
529	"None"	David Grann	"It's Saint Patrick's Day, so you can kiss my blarney stones. This is The Colbert Report."	March 17	5038
530	"Keeping Our Heads"	Juan Cole	"Hey, Bartlett's, here's a quotation: 'Put me in your book, or you're a jerk.' This is The Colbert Report."	March 18	5039
531	"None"	John McCardell	"Let's play Rock-paper-scissors. Mail in your answers, and we'll see who won. This is The Colbert Report."	March 19	5040
532	"None"	Emily Yoffe, Derrick Pitts	"Hey, former GM CEO Rick Wagner, if you're looking for a job: I need someone to stand in my parking space. This is The Colbert Report."	March 30	5041
533	"None"	David Plotz	"I thought March was supposed to go out like a lamb. Where's my mint jelly? This is The Colbert Report."	March 31	5042

=== April ===
No.	"The Wørd"	Guest(s)	Introductory phrase	Original release date	Prod. code
534	"Fine Line"	Dambisa Moyo	"Hey, songbirds nesting outside my window, you're now 82 months behind on your rent. This is The Colbert Report."	April 01	5043
535	"None"	Biz Stone	"ER is off the air after 15 seasons. That's what you get with Obama's socialized medicine. This is The Colbert Report."	April 02	5044
536	"None"	Tom Brokaw, Rich Lowry	"It's April 6th: only nine more days to hide your assets offshore. This is The Colbert Report."	April 06	5045
537	"Morally Bankrupt"	H.M. Queen Noor of Jordan	"Vermont just legalized gay marriage. Ben, you can finally propose to Jerry. This is The Colbert Report."	April 07	5046
538	"None"	Phil Bronstein	"Put your money where your mouth is, it's a lot safer than a bank. This is The Colbert Report."	April 08	5047
539	"None"	Bart Ehrman	None (show begins with opening sequence)	April 09	5048
540	"Have Your Cake And Eat It, Too"	Sunita Williams, Susie Orbach	"Hey Navy Seals, why don't you take a crack at Captain Morgan? That guy made me feel like I was captive in a boat for 5 days. This is The Colbert Report."	April 14	5049
541	"None"	Jim Lehrer	"Do not adjust your set -- unless you want to make my face even redder. This is The Colbert Report."	April 15	5050
542	"None"	Kanishk Tharoor, Douglas Kmiec	"I hate to pet myself on the back, so I have my assistant do it. This is The Colbert Report."	April 16	5051
543	"None"	Ken Quinn, Sheriff Joe Arpaio	"Spoiler alert! Ugly duckling, you're actually a swan. An ugly swan. This is The Colbert Report."	April 20	5052
544	"Stressed Position"	Mike Krzyzewski	"For NHL play-off highlights and scores: move to Canada. This is The Colbert Report."	April 21	5053
545	"None"	Ira Glass	"I float like a butterfly, sting like a bee, and if that fails I curl up like an armadillo. This is The Colbert Report."	April 22	5054
546	"Brunt Double"	Elizabeth Bintliff, Daisy	"My show is suitable for ages 9 to 99. After that you're Willard Scott's problem. This is The Colbert Report."	April 23	5055
547	"None"	The Decemberists	"I say potahto — end of story. This is The Colbert Report."	April 27	5056
548	"None"	Richard Engel, Daniel Gross	"The Colbert Report is filmed before whatever follows it. This is The Colbert Report."	April 28	5057
549	"None"	David Kessler	"Hey mom, let me say in advance: Happy belated mother's day. This is The Colbert Report."	April 29	5058
550	"None"	Jonathan Alter, Ethan Nadelmann	"I don't know how many licks it takes to get to the center of a Tootsie Pop, but it takes 12,809 licks to get to the center of an iPhone. This is The Colbert Report."	April 30	5059

=== May ===
No.	"The Wørd"	Guest(s)	Introductory phrase	Original release date	Prod. code
551	"None"	J. J. Abrams	None (show begins with opening sequence)	May 04	5060
552	"Captain Kangaroo Court"	Cliff Sloan, Paul Rieckhoff	"Hey, codebreakers, here's a hint: try harder! This is The Colbert Report."	May 05	5061
553	"None"	Laurie Garrett	"If the eyes are the window to the soul, then why does it hurt when I spray them with Windex? This is The Colbert Report."	May 06	5062
554	"None"	Mitchell Joachim	"Remember, when you hear the secret word, scream real loud. Tonight's secret word: Shhh. This is The Colbert Report."	May 07	5063
555	"None"	Tamara Draut, Jeff Daniels	"If a tree falls in the forest and there's no-one there to hear it, my illegal logging business succeeds. This is The Colbert Report."	May 11	5064
556	"None"	Julia Sweig, Ron Howard	"All proceeds from tonight's show go to a worthy cause: my advertisers. This is The Colbert Report."	May 12	5065
557	"None"	Michael Pollan	"When in Rome, I find a McDonald's where they speak English. This is The Colbert Report."	May 13	5066
558	"None"	Yusuf	"Hey, blessings in disguise, what are you hiding? This is The Colbert Report."	May 14	5067
559	"Tough Cell"	Meghan McCain	(waving) "Hey you! Watching this on mute! Turn up the volume! This is The Colbert Report!"	May 18	5068
560	"I Know You Are But What Am I?"	Walter Kirn	"I don't like to brag; I love it. This is The Colbert Report."	May 19	5069
561	"None"	Bob Graham, Seth Shostak	"You can catch more flies with honey than with vinegar. It also makes them taste better. This is The Colbert Report."	May 20	5070
562	"None"	Green Day	"I'm all that and a bag of celery. I'm trying to slim down for bikini season. This is The Colbert Report."	May 21	5071

=== June ===
No.	"The Wørd"	Guest(s)	Introductory phrase	Original release date	Prod. code
563	"None"	Jeffrey Toobin, Byron Dorgan	"Congratulations to Conan O'Brien on his first show tonight. Which, I believe (checks watch) starts at 12:00 tonight. This is the Colbert Report."	June 01	5072
Byron Dorgan doesn't believe in the kind of banking modernization that caused the Great Depression.
564	"None"	Katty Kay	"Hey, hold your horses. Even horses need to be held sometimes. This is the Colbert Report."	June 02	5073
Katty Kay explains the significant value of women in the workplace, even though they work in different ways than men.
565	"I Do, You Don't"	Eric Schlosser	"I cannot tell a lie. I prefer to tell them in packs o' three. This is the Colbert Report."	June 03	5074
Eric Schlosser exposes the bizarre development of science-fiction factory farming systems over the last 30 years.
566	"Just Don't Do It"	Dag Soderberg	"This show's got everything from soup to nuts. By the way, stay away from the soup, my nuts were in there. This is the Colbert Report."	June 04	5075
Tonight Stephen welcomes the co-founder and creative visionary of The Bible Illuminated, Dag Soderberg.
567	"Why Are You Here?"	General Ray Odierno, Barack Obama	"This is Operation Iraqi Stephen: Going Commando. Broadcasting from Camp Victory, Baghdad, Iraq."	June 08	5076
General Ray Odierno steps up to the plate to be Stephen's first guest in Iraq.
568	"None"	Bill Clinton, George H. W. Bush, Sergeant Robin Balcom, Specialist Tareq Salha	"This is Operation Iraqi Stephen: Going Commando. Broadcasting from Camp Victory, Baghdad, Iraq."	June 09	5077
Stephen welcomes Sergeant Robin Balcom and Specialist Tareq Salha to his international desk of wisdom and truthiness.
569	"None"	Joe Biden, Sarah Palin, General Charles Jacoby	"This is Operation Iraqi Stephen: Going Commando. Broadcasting from Camp Victory, Baghdad, Iraq."	June 10	5078
Lieutenant General Charles Jacoby pays a visit to the Colbert Nation, which is coincidentally in Iraq for the time being.
570	"None"	George W. Bush, Senator Jim Webb, Sergeant Major Frank Grippe	"This is Operation Iraqi Stephen: Going Commando. Broadcasting from Camp Victory, Baghdad, Iraq."	June 11	5079
Stephen wraps up his stay in Iraq with Command Sergeant Major Frank Grippe.
571	"None"	Austan Goolsbee	"Bathing suit season is right around the corner ... for you prudes who wear them. This is the Colbert Report."	June 15	5080
Austan Goolsbee takes a break from Obama's Council of Economic Advisers to talk shop with Stephen.
572	"None"	Jim Rogers	"No sense beating a dead horse, unless it's one of those zombie horses. You can't beat them enough. This is the Colbert Report."	June 16	5081
Jim Rogers electrifies The Colbert Report when the Duke Energy CEO joins Stephen for a chat.
573	"Bohemian Grove"	Joshua Micah Marshall	"Wow! Those Iranians are really pissed at Letterman. This is the Colbert Report."	June 17	5082
Stephen proves he's fair and balanced by giving favorable news coverage of Barack Obama killing a fly.
574	"None"	Paul Muldoon	"To make a long story short, give Joe Biden a sedative. This is the Colbert Report."	June 18	5083
Princeton Prof and White House poetry slam participant, Paul Muldoon hits Stephen with some of his words.
575	"None"	Simon Schama	"Summer is in full swing. Hey, summer, consider a jockstrap. This is the Colbert Report."	June 22	5084
Promotional appearance by Jeff Goldblum. Simon Schama and Stephen discuss the author's new book, The American Future: A History.
576	"None"	David Kilcullen	None	June 23	5085
Stephen first talks to former presidential candidate Howard Dean about health care reform, and wraps up the evening by chatting with Dave Kilcullen about his new book, The Accidental Guerilla.
577	"None"	Matthew Crawford	"You snooze, you lose... unless it's a sleeping contest. This is the Colbert Report."	June 24	5086
Stephen joins Matthew Crawford on his journey from Ph.D to motorcycle repairman as they look through the author's debut tome, "Shop Class as Soulcraft."
578	"Stonewalling"	Jim Fouratt	"Hey yogurt, if you're so cultured, how come I never see you at the opera? This is the Colbert Report."	June 25	5087
Gay exorcism, Obama's promise to LGBT community, Prescription for America
579	"Noncensus"	Neil DeGrasse Tyson, Cheap Trick	None	June 29	5088
Death of Michael Jackson, Mark Sanford, Census, Jeff Goldblum, Nova scienceNOW
580	"None"	Alexi Lalas, Kevin Mattson	"Bernie, look on the bright side. When you get out, no one will suspect a 221-year-old man. This is the Colbert Report."	June 30	5089
Al Franken, War on the 4th of July, Soccer, Jimmy Carter

=== July ===
No.	"The Wørd"	Guest(s)	Introductory phrase	Original release date	Prod. code
581	"None"	Nicholas Kristof	"Today is Canada Day, and I celebrated the way I always do, by not knowing it's Canada Day. This is The Colbert Report."	July 01	5090
The Supreme Court takes its recess, and Nicholas Kristof crosses five lanes of busy traffic
582	"Ban de Soleil"	Ed Viesturs	"Next week it's reruns. I'll still be here doing the shows, but the cameras are on vacation. This is The Colbert Report."	July 02	5091
Anderson Cooper's Michael Jackson exclusive, Climate change, Lost Treasures of Babylon
583	"None"	Paul Krugman	"A broken clock is right twice a day. So go out and get yourself 720 clocks. This is The Colbert Report."	July 13	5092
The end of Michael Jackson coverage. Stephen's Sound Advice - How to bork a nominee. Paul Rieckhoff
584	"Guns, Credit, and Corn"	Leymah Gbowee	"Tonight's the all-star game. But don't let the exciting name fool you - it's still baseball. This is The Colbert Report."	July 14	5093
The Sotomayor Confirmation Hearings, Obama's health care plan, J. D. Salinger lawsuit
585	"None"	Douglas Rushkoff	"Is this a wand in my pocket, or am I just happy to see the new Harry Potter movie? This is The Colbert Report."	July 15	5094
Governor Mark Sanford coverage. "Tip of the Hat, Wag of the Finger" - a wag at Leon Panetta, tip to the Texas Board of Education, tip to straight penguins. Difference Makers - Senator Doug Jackson
586	"Neutral Man's Burden"	Edmund Andrews	"The Sears Tower is now called the Willis Tower. Man - Bruce Willis is loaded. This is The Colbert Report."	July 16	5095
Emmy nomination announcements. Supreme Court neutrality. Cheating Death - diabetes, sports medicine, pain management
587	"None"	Bob Park	None	July 20	5096
Death of Walter Cronkite. Reverse racism and personal responsibility with Geoffrey Canada. Sport Report - Tony Romo dropping Jessica Simpson, taekwondo champion Logan Campbell, UFC sponsorship
588	"A Perfect World"	Aaron Carroll	"It's all fun and games till someone loses an eye. Then the game becomes 'Find The Eye'. This is The Colbert Report."	July 21	5097
The Moon landing anniversary. Proposed torture prosecutions. Better Know A Lobby - ACORN
589	"None"	Chris Anderson	"A mother's work is never done. Which reminds me - mom, cue the theme music. This is The Colbert Report."	July 22	5098
Solar eclipse in Asia, Matthew Waxman discusses assassination squads, Pope Benedict's hospitalization
590	"None"	Zev Chafets	None	July 23	5099
Obama's health care plan and The Matrix. The "ThreatDown:" - 4. The US Senate!, 3. Henry Louis Gates!, 2. Bill Gates!, 1. Unemployed Wilford Brimley!
591	"None"	Movits!	"If anyone at Comic-Con found a pair of dark brown Princess Leia pin-on buns with the initials S.C., they're not mine - but you can send them here. This is The Colbert Report."	July 27	5100
Sarah Palin steps down as Governor. "Stephen Colbert's Current Events" - Tasers. "Nailed 'Em" - Nazareth Library bans young Dominic Philip for living in the wrong district
592	"None"	Arianna Huffington	None	July 28	5101
Obama's response to the Henry Louis Gates incident and Teachable moments. "Womb Raiders" - Obama's birth certificate. Interview with Orly Taitz on the birther movement
593	"He Who Smelt It, Dealt It"	Kevin Baker	"Today's Colbert Club kids' activity - color in more of my hair! This is The Colbert Report."	July 29	5102
Viacom reports a 2nd quarter profit fall, Stephen cuts costs and takes on roommate Frank. Media coverage of the Henry Louis Gates incident. "Stephen Colbert's Sport Report" - Lance Armstrong doesn't win the Tour de France, and Japan invents a robotic baseball pitcher and batter
594	"None"	Kathryn Bigelow	(roommate Frank is relaxing at the desk, Stephen enters) "Frank, what are you doing? This is The Colbert Report."	July 30	5103
Beer selections at the Henry Louis Gates summit. "Stephen Colbert's meTunes" - I Gotta Feeling by The Black Eyed Peas, Birthday Sex by Jeremih and Fire Burning by Sean Kingston. "Tip of the Hat, Wag of the Finger" - wag at textbooks for political correctness, tip at Stephen Colbert for helping Movits! boost their Amazon sales ranking, wag at Stephen Colbert for giving Movits! too much publicity. A tribute to Gidget, the Taco Bell chihuahua.

=== August ===
No.	"The Wørd"	Guest(s)	Introductory phrase	Original release date	Prod. code
595	"None"	Anthony Zinni	"If at first you don't succeed, redefine what you did as success. This is The Colbert Report."	August 3	5104
Dominick Philip gets back his library card and a box of books as punishment. "Stephen Colbert's Bears & Balls" - the cost of health care reform. "Nailed 'Em" - Virginia student suspended for taking the pill on campus.
596	"Hippie Replacement"	David Wondrich, Kurt Andersen	None	August 4	5105
Merry Barackmas - Obama's 48th birthday. The 40th anniversary of the Woodstock Festival. David Wondrich discusses the history of cocktails and introduces the Colbert Bump cocktail.
597	"None"	Kris Kobach	None	August 5	5106
Bill Clinton visits Korea to secure the release of two American journalists. Candidates for the 2010 midterms and interview with Pennsylvania congressman Joe Sestak. Shark Week returns to the Discovery Channel and shark coverage in the media.
598	"None"	Meryl Streep	"Twitter went down today. If only there was some short, shallow, self-indulgent way to express my horror. This is The Colbert Report."	August 6	5107
Jeremih becomes the Chicago Public Schools new spokesman. Yahweh or No Way - a Florida judge clears the way for government seizure of creationist theme park Dinosaur Adventure Land, President Obama's ancestors may have been posthumously baptized by Mormons, and a New Jersey federal corruption probe results in the arrest of politicians and 5 rabbis accused of money laundering and an Orthodox Jewish man accused of kidney trading. Movies That Are Destroying America - G.I. Joe: The Rise of Cobra, Orphan, 2012, and Julie & Julia.
599	"None"	Barbara Boxer	"You can make an omelette without breaking eggs - it's just a really bad omelette. This is The Colbert Report."	August 10	5108
Sarah Palin and Newt Gingrich discuss details of health care reform which don't appear in the bill. Cold War Update - President Obama turns off the electronic ticker at the diplomatic headquarters in Havana, Cuba runs low on toilet paper, and Vladimir Putin appears shirtless. Better Know a District profiles Maine's 1st district with Chellie Pingree.
600	"None"	Jonathan Cohn	"Well after 20 years, Brooks & Dunn broke up. (shakes fist) Yoko! This is The Colbert Report."	August 11	5109
Risks of texting while driving. Discussion of the upcoming elections in Afghanistan and interview with James Carville. Alpha Dog of the Week - Betty Lichtenstein of Connecticut awards herself a fake Nurse of the Year award from a non-existent organization at a phony awards ceremony.
601	"None"	Mark Johnson	"Hey, Perseid meteor shower - thank you for proving that the sky is falling. This is The Colbert Report."	August 12	5110
Report that Americans would be willing to sacrifice their iPod to save the environment. Who's Not Honoring Me Now? - Sidney Poitier receives the Presidential Medal of Freedom, Sarah Palin receives the NRA's Gold Medal Award of Merit for the Promotion of Gun Collecting, and the Jonas Brothers get a haircut on the Teen Choice Awards. Formidable Opponent - shouting people down at town hall meetings. Playing for Change perform "Stand by Me".
602	"None"	Mark Devlin	"Dick Cheney's coming out with his memoirs - and good news, just reading it violates the Geneva Convention. This is The Colbert Report."	August 13	5111
Texas congresswoman Sheila Jackson-Lee takes a phone call during a cancer survivor's question at a town hall meeting. Glenn Beck loses sponsors over his comments on the President. Cheating Death with Dr. Stephen T. Colbert, D.F.A. - Spinal Health - spinal injuries in rats mended by blue M&M's, Vitamins - U.S. children lacking vitamin D due to TV and computers, Women's Health - Wyeth Pharmaceuticals found to have hired ghost writers to author papers downplaying the risks of taking hormones for menopausal women. Mark Devlin discusses launching the BLAST telescope using weather balloons.
603	"Must-Be TV"	Bill McKibben	"Ninety percent of US currency has traces of cocaine on it. That should boost our exchange rate. This is The Colbert Report."	August 17	5112
Obama's op-ed "Why We Need Health Care Reform", price of postage stamps, Better Know a District: Colorado's 2nd congressional district (Jared Polis), climate change
604	"Arch Enemies"	Robert Wright	"Congratulations, Brett Favre, on setting the NFL record for incomplete retirements. This is The Colbert Report."	August 18	5113
Afghan presidential election, 2009, Archie proposes to Veronica, Tip of the Hat, Wag of the Finger, The Evolution of God
605	"None"	Marion Nestle, Ang Lee	None	August 19	5114
Barney Frank's response in a town hall meeting about health care reform, sugar shortage in the US, Colbert Platinum: AIG's CEO planned vacation, Taking Woodstock
606	"None"	Chris Matthews	"After the show I'm on vacation, so nobody do anything newsworthy for three weeks! This is The Colbert Report."	August 20	5115
French town bans circus elephants from beach, anti-Obama items sold on eBay, world population projected to reach 7 billion in 2011, Chris Matthews running for Senate, The Kennedy Brothers documentary

=== September ===
No.	"The Wørd"	Guest(s)	Introductory phrase	Original release date	Prod. code
607	"None"	Cory Booker	"I'm back from vacation. What did you bring me? This is The Colbert Report."	September 14	5116
608	"Let Freedom Ka-Ching"	Jeffrey Toobin, Christiane Amanpour	None	September 15	5117
609	"None"	The Flaming Lips	"Don't pee on my leg and tell me it's raining---pee on my leg and tell me you love me. This is The Colbert Report."	September 16	5118
610	"Allison!"	Frank Bruni	None	September 17	5119
Stephen stares at a goat by means of resurrecting a 1970s psychic military program, and interviews via satellite Jon Ronson, author of The Men Who Stare at Goats. In "Stephen Colbert's Sport Report" he tries to predict the football season's gossip with his "NFL wheel of scandal". Guest of the night Frank Bruni talks about his new book and how he got to become a food critic. The Wørd and the following montage is a good-bye devoted to executive producer of the show Allison Silverman.
611	"None"	Shai Agassi	"Obama was on five shows this sunday morning: sounds like somebody hates church. This is The Colbert Report."	September 22	5120
Promotional appearance by Jeff Goldblum.
612	"None"	Michael Moore, A. J. Jacobs	None	September 23	5121
613	"Blackwashing"	Ken Burns	"Television is the most important communication tool in history... now can I have an Emmy? This is The Colbert Report."	September 24	5122
614	"None"	Sheryl WuDunn	None	September 28	5123
615	"Out Of The Closet"	Matt Latimer	"Congratulations, Kate Plus 8, sorry, Jon plus none. This is The Colbert Report."	September 29	5124
616	"None"	Richard Dawkins	"The Obamas are going to Kopenhagen... Party at Biden's house! This is The Colbert Report."	September 30	5125

=== October ===
No.	"The Wørd"	Guest(s)	Introductory phrase	Original release date	Prod. code
617	"None"	George Wendt, Francis Collins	None	October 01	5126
618	"Learning Is Fundamental"	Andrew Gellman, Arne Duncan	"The socialists take power in Greece... I didn't even know Obama was on the ballot. This is The Colbert Report."	October 05	5127
619	"None"	Lara Logan, The Mountain Goats	None	October 06	5128
620	"None"	Alison Gopnik	"Time heals all wounds. So if you're uninsured, get a watch. This is The Colbert Report."	October 07	5129
621	"None"	Colin Beavan	"No, thanks, loose leaf paper, I prefer abstinence leaf paper, you whore! This is The Colbert Report."	October 08	5130
622	"None"	Shashi Tharoor, Dr. Sanjay Gupta	"Hey, has anybody seen my bathwater? I may have accidentally thrown something out with it. This is The Colbert Report."	October 12	5131
Discussion of Obama's Nobel Peace prize, "Why do other countries like Obama?" with Shashi Tharoor, Fallback Position with James Blake, discussion of Cheating Death with Dr. Sanjay Gupta
623	"Symbol-Minded"	David Javerbaum, Sylvia Earle	"The health care bill is out of committee. Hip Hip replacement! This is The Colbert Report."	October 13	5132
624	"None"	Amy Farrell, RZA	None	October 14	5133
625	"None"	Jerry Mitchell	"Barack Obama is sending each senior citizen 250 dollars, inside 50 birthday cards. This is The Colbert Report."	October 15	5134
626	"Don't Ask Don't Tell"	Cornel West	None	October 26	5135
627	"None"	Gail Collins	"I'm sittin' in the cat bird seat. Sorry, cat bird, you should have called 'savesies'. This is The Colbert Report."	October 27	5136
628	"You-Genics"	Brian Cox	"World Series tonight.. assuming the world only includes New York to Pennsylvania. This is The Colbert Report."	October 28	5137
629	"None"	Rosanne Cash, Bill Simmons	"Sorry, uh.. the show's running long, I'm not gonna say anything here. Colbert Report."	October 29	5138

=== November ===
No.	"The Wørd"	Guest(s)	Introductory phrase	Original release date	Prod. code
630	"None"	Dan Jansen, Nicholas Thompson	"What's that? It's an hour earlier because daylight savings time is over and we haven't actually done the show yet? Oh. Then this is The Colbert Report."	November 02	5139
631	"The Green Mile"	Andrew Sullivan	"Mayor Bloomberg, congratulations on another term, sir! Unless you lost, in which case I never liked you. This is The Colbert Report."	November 03	5140
632	"None"	Al Gore, Harold Evans	"Quitters never win. Unless they're competing in a quitting contest. This is The Colbert Report."	November 04	5141
633	"None"	Joey Cheek, William Bratton	"I can prove the free market works: the Yankees won the World Series. This is The Colbert Report."	November 05	5142
634	"None"	Thomas Campbell	"Happy 40th birthday, Sesame Street! That bird's not getting any bigger; I say we eat him now. This is The Colbert Report."	November 09	5143
635	"None"	Karim Sadjadpour, Maria Shriver	"If you can't beat 'em, join 'em. Then beat 'em. They'll never see it coming. This is The Colbert Report."	November 10	5144
636	"None"	Christopher Caldwell	"Don't cry over spilled milk. By this time tomorrow, it'll be free yogurt. This is The Colbert Report."	November 11	5145
637	"The Money Shot"	Woody Harrelson	"TGIF: Thank God It's Fursday. This is The Colbert Report."	November 12	5146
638	"Skeletons In The Closet"	Paul Goldberger	"If it walks like a duck, and quacks like a duck, send it back, it's a little undercooked. This is The Colbert Report."	November 16	5147
639	"None"	Marc Kielburger, Malcolm Gladwell	"Sarah Palin's book goes on sale today. I just hope this finally gets her some media exposure. This is The Colbert Report."	November 17	5148
640	"Grand Old Pity Party"	Norah Jones	"For the 4th year in a row Sexiest man alive did not go to Matthew McConaughey: there is no god! This is The Colbert Report."	November 18	5149
Stephen criticizes Going Rogue, calling it "a steaming pile of shit" in The Word. In Threat Down, he names himself as a Threat, saying that he angered Quetzacoatl by calling him a pussy in 2005, and he refuses to apologize. He interviews Norah Jones, and she sings.
641	"None"	John Pike, Elvis Costello	None	November 19	5150
642	"None"	Dan Esty, Cevin Soling	"Hey, I must be an athlete! I have the same number of wins as the New Jersey Nets. This, this is The Colbert Report."	November 30	5151

=== December ===
No.	"The Wørd"	Guest(s)	Introductory phrase	Original release date	Prod. code
643	"None"	Guy Consolmagno, Sherman Alexie	"Only 24 more shopping days to accept Jesus Christ as your Lord and Savior. This is The Colbert Report."	December 01	5152
644	"None"	Craig Watkins	"The Colbert Report will begin after this important message: This is The Colbert Report."	December 02	5153
645	"None"	Janet Napolitano	"The inventor of the Hokey Pokey has died. That is going to be one long burial. This is The Colbert Report."	December 03	5154
646	"None"	Bill T. Jones	"Let's make this easier. Raise your hand if you didn't have an affair with Tiger Woods. This is The Colbert Report."	December 07	5155
647	"None"	Bernie Sanders, Andy Schlafly	"A warning: in the next few weeks, you may hear Paul McCartney's Simply Having a Wonderful Christmastime. Stay calm, it will pass. This is The Colbert Report."	December 08	5156
648	"Grand Old Purity"	Matt Taibbi	"An independent panel said the TARP program worked. Hmm, I wonder what program funded that panel? This is The Colbert Report."	December 09	5157
649	"None"	Lara Logan	None	December 10	5158
650	"None"	Katherine Reutter, Snoop Dogg	"No Man Is an Island, but I have one hell of a peninsula. This is The Colbert Report."	December 14	5159
651	"None"	Alicia Keys	"Christmas is coming, the goose's cholesterol count is through the roof. I am really worried about him. This is The Colbert Report."	December 15	5160
652	"Spyvate Sector"	Tom Brokaw	None	December 16	5161
