= Jerome Goddard =

American entomologist (born 1957)

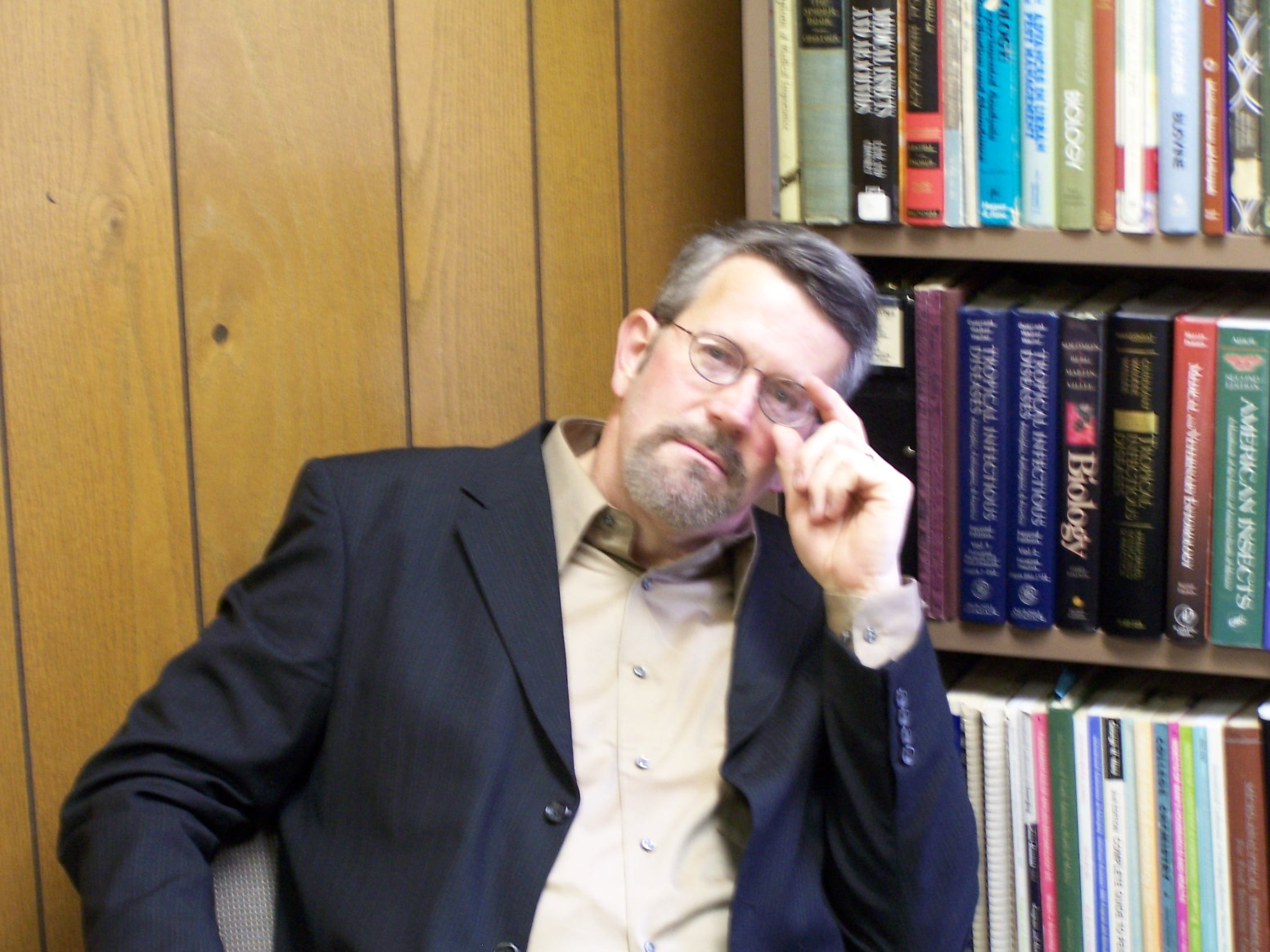
- Born: 1957 (age 68–69)
- Citizenship: United States
- Known for: research on ticks and bed bugs
- Scientific career
- Fields: entomology
- Workplaces: Mississippi State University

Jerome Goddard (born 1957) is an American entomologist currently located at Mississippi State University who is known for research on a number of medically important arthropods, most notably ticks and the common bed bug. His work on the health effects of bed bugs has helped clarify the pathophysiology of cutaneous reactions to their bites.

Prior to coming to Mississippi State, Goddard was an Air Force medical entomologist for 3 years and then State Medical Entomologist for the Mississippi Department of Health for 20 years. After Hurricane Katrina (2005), Goddard was the health department official responsible for the mosquito and vector control program along the Mississippi Gulf Coast. He is the author of a medical textbook used by physicians which won "Highly Commended" in 2003 in the British Medical Association's Best Medical Book of the Year competition. Over the last two decades Goddard has served as an educational resource concerning medically important arthropods to a U.S. Congressional Committee, in various newspapers and magazines such as Reader's Digest, and on television programs such as The Learning Channel ("Living with Bugs") and the Colbert Report.

== See also ==
- Bed bug
- Insect bites and stings
- List of The Colbert Report episodes (2010) (Jerome Goddard appears on the Colbert report)
