= Candwich =

Canned food product

- A peanut-butter-and-jelly Candwich
- Inventor: Mark Kirkland
- Inception: 2011
- Manufacturer: MK1 Foods (formerly Mark One Foods, LLC.)
- Website: www.candwich.com

Candwich is a canned food product created and produced by Mark One Foods, LLC (aka MK1 Foods). Candwich is marketed as "the only sandwich in a can." Its slogan is, "Quick & Tasty, Ready to Eat".

== History ==
Founder and creator Mark Kirkland claims he came up with the idea for Candwich when he was drinking a can of soda with a cookie, and wondered if he could sell cookies in a can out of vending machines. In 2003, Kirkland received a patent for placing food and non-food items in a can to be dispensed from a vending machine. and also found that the military had developed a process for shelf-stable bread. Mark One Foods, LLC was formed in 2009 to market and produce Candwich. In 2010, the United States Securities and Exchange Commission filed a lawsuit against Travis L. Wright, a money manager who raised $145 million to invest in Mark One Foods, among other companies, when Wright had told investors that the money was for real estate investments. Wright had invested approximately $1 million into Mark One Foods. Wright was not part of Mark One Foods, just an investor, and the company was not charged with any wrongdoing. The Candwich is also being marketed for disaster preparedness and relief. On July 9, 2010, Stephen Colbert featured the Candwich in an episode of The Colbert Report.

== Products ==
As of November 2011, the only flavor available is "Peanut Butter and Jelly - Grape", although the website claims that "Peanut Butter and Jelly - Strawberry" and "Barbecue Chicken" will be offered. Other potential ideas included pepperoni pizza pocket, French toast, and cinnamon rolls. A can of "Peanut Butter and Jelly - Grape" can contains "a small hoagie roll, a packet of peanut butter, a packet of jelly, a plastic knife and a handi-wipe" and a piece of Laffy Taffy. The Candwich had a one year shelf life. As of 2011, the Candwich was available online and at 7-Eleven stores in Salt Lake City, Utah. Starting September 15, 2016, Candwich could be pre-ordered via a crowdfunding campaign on Indiegogo. In 2021, the Candwich underwent a relaunch, announcing they were now available to purchase from vending machines in the locale. They also rebranded as Mk1 Foods Corp.
