= List of The Colbert Report episodes =

The Colbert Report is a late-night series that aired nightly on Comedy Central. Hosted by Stephen Colbert, it was produced by Colbert, Jon Stewart, and Ben Karlin and revolved around Colbert playing the role of a populist blowhard journalist character, similar to his role on The Daily Show. In The Colbert Report, the former correspondent became the host of his own parody of media pundit programs, such as The O'Reilly Factor and Hannity & Colmes.

There are a number of noteworthy recurring elements in most episodes of The Colbert Report. Many episodes feature "The Wørd" of the day, which serves as a theme for a monologue early in the episode. Each has a studio guest later in the episode, and each begins with a brief summary of what the episode will contain, followed by an introductory phrase and then by the theme music. This introductory phrase very often inserts the word truth into a common phrase, such as "Apply Truth liberally to the inflamed area," or says, "this is The Colbert Report," though there are exceptions.
