= Barry Levine (journalist) =

American journalist

Barry Levine is an American journalist who served as executive editor of tabloid news journal The National Enquirer. He is the author of The Spider: Inside the Tangled Web of Jeffrey Epstein and Ghislaine Maxwell and co-author of All the President's Women: Donald Trump and the Making of a Predator.

== History ==
Levine worked at Temple News during the 1970s, ultimately becoming the journal's editor-in-chief. He worked at the National Enquirer from 1999 to 2016.

According to Ronan Farrow, Levine hid documents containing damaging information on United States president Donald Trump leading up to the 2016 presidential election. American Media Inc, which owned the National Enquirer, ordered the destruction of the documents in November of that year, right after the company was asked about its payment to Karen McDougal for her silence on her alleged relationship with Trump.

Levine left the Enquirer in 2016 in order to write his book about Trump's sexual life. The published version of the book did not discuss Trump's hush money payments to female celebrities through American Media's publisher David Pecker. He said that the omission was partly due to a non-disclosure agreement.
