= Recurring segments on The Colbert Report =

Television series segments

In addition to its standard interviews, The Colbert Report featured many recurring segments that cover a variety of topics.

== Alpha Dog of the Week ==
Alpha Dog of the Week is a segment in which Colbert heaps praise on one specific news maker from the previous week for, as Colbert himself puts it, being "such an imposing presence that people automatically fall in place behind you, deferentially sniffing your butt." The irony of the segment comes from the fact that the honoree has typically fallen from grace as a result of the supposed alpha behavior Colbert is celebrating.

== Atone Phone ==
The Atone Phone was introduced in the 2006 season during the Jewish High Holidays. Colbert interprets the Ten Days of Repentance to mean that Jewish people should apologize specifically to him, and introduces a hotline (1-888-OOPS-JEW) that Jews can call to apologize for anything that they may have done to "wrong" Colbert. The phone occasionally rings during the show, with an old style bell ringer that rings to the tune of Hava Nagila. The segment is reintroduced every season during the High Holidays, and each subsequent season it is revealed that the number to call has to be shared with another hotline that shares the same number, first 1-888-MOPS-KEY and later 1-888-MOSS-LEW., 1-888-MOS-PLEX, 1-888-NORS-LEZ, 1-888-O-MRS-LEX, and 1-888-O-NPR-LDY.

== Better Know a District ==
Better Know a District is a recurring segment where Colbert interviews members of Congress from specific districts, hoping to fill all 434 spaces on his map. (The missing 435th district is California's 50th, which was declared dead to Stephen in 2005 following the Duke Cunningham scandal, because it had "let Duke down." On Ash Wednesday in 2006, its status was changed to "never existed to me," making it the only item in that category.) The segment features Colbert first giving a short history lesson on the district, then interviewing the representative and asking them "loaded" questions.

=== Spinoffs ===
- Better Know a Challenger, a segment during the 2006 Congressional Elections where Colbert interviewed challengers because the incumbent declined to appear on his show.
- Better Know a Protectorate, a 4-part series focusing on the protectorates of the United States.
- Better Know a Founder, a 56-part series focusing on the signers of the United States Declaration of Independence.
- Better Know a President, a 43-part series where Colbert interviews former Presidents by speaking to impersonators.
- Meet an Ally, a series focusing on the nations in the Coalition of the Willing.
- Betterer Know a District, features extended versions of previously shown interviews.
- Better Know a Memory, a "recap" of sorts following the 2006 elections, showing "better known" representatives that had been returned to Congress.
- Better Know a Presidential Candidate Who'll Talk to Me, an indefinite series featuring interviews with presidential candidates from the 2008 presidential election. To date, only Republicans Mike Huckabee (who asked Colbert to be his running mate) and Ron Paul have appeared for such interviews, although Hillary Clinton, Barack Obama, and John Edwards have all made appearances on the Report.
- Better Know a Governor, a series focusing on state governors (starting with Mark Sanford)
- Better Know a Lobby, a 35,000-part (originally infinite-part) series, introduced on the February 6, 2008 episode, focusing on lobbyists that work on Capitol Hill.
- Better Know a Beatle, a 4-part series focusing on the members of The Beatles.
- Better Know a Cradle of Civilization, a 1-part series about the history of Iraq shown during Operation Iraqi Stephen.
- Better Know a Made Up District, a [unintelligible] part series about made up districts; a reference to inaccurate submissions to the United States government's website that tracks the spending of stimulus money, by business people who made up congressional districts.
- Better Know a Stephen, a segment introduced December 16, 2009 in which Colbert interviews other prominent men named Stephen (specifically spelled with a "ph").
- Better Know an Enemy, a series focusing on the terrorist enemies.
- Better Know a Riding, a 1-part segment focusing on the Canadian Electoral District held by Member of Parliament Ujjal Dosanjh which took place on February 22, 2010 during the 2010 Winter Olympics in Vancouver, British Columbia, Canada. The riding profiled was Vancouver South, where the Olympics took place.
- Better Know a Kissinger, A one part series on Henry Kissinger prior to Colbert's interview of Henry Kissinger.
- Better Know a Salinger/Hemingway, One-part series on whoever he profiles in the Colbert book club.
- Better Know a America, A one part series in which Stephen Colbert interviews President Obama.

== The Blitzkrieg on Grinchitude ==
A segment that is featured around Christmas season where Colbert covers stories that involve people suggested to be attacking Christmas getting foiled in various ways.

== The Boards ==
Originating from phrases used by Colbert as a warning or condemnation, the On Notice and Dead to Me boards are giant blue boards listing people and things that have angered Colbert. When the On Notice board is full, Colbert is forced to either remove an item or transfer it to the Dead to Me board, which is reserved for his most hated nemeses. One-off variations have included a Called Out white board on August 14, 2006, a red Fantasies board on January 31, 2007, a Do Not Say board on April 25, 2007 and a pocket-sized "On Notice" board on October 2, 2007.

== Cheating Death with Dr. Stephen T. Colbert, D.F.A. ==
Cheating Death is a medical and health-related segment. During Cheating Death, Colbert refers to himself as Dr. Stephen T. Colbert, D.F.A., a reference to the Honorary Fine Arts Doctorate that was awarded to him by Knox College.

The introduction graphic to this segment is a reference to the chess game with Death in Ingmar Bergman's film The Seventh Seal, with Colbert wearing scrubs as he uses trickery to literally cheat Death and win (another variant has him conning Death out of its money at three card monte). Colbert usually then prefaces each segment by noting that he is not a medical doctor, but a Doctor of Fine Arts, followed by a joke about what he is allowed to do (example: delivering babies through Georgia O'Keeffe paintings). The segment usually features accounts of actual medical and health news, including recent breakthroughs and announcements of the type found on other medical and health segments which then segue into plugs for the (fictional) sponsor, Prescott Pharmaceuticals, and their highly dubious "Vaxa" product line. (Prescott Pharmaceuticals is apparently part of a large, rather shady company known as the Prescott Group, whom Colbert frequently promotes. Their other divisions include Prescott Oil and Prescott Finance.) This health advice is generally dangerous or unhelpful, and said products also cause bizarre side effects such as "Skeletal Xylophoning", or "REO Speedlung". The segment always ends with Colbert saying, "I'll see you in health!," a play on the phrase, "I'll see you in hell!"

On the April 25, 2011 episode, Colbert renamed his product line "Vacsa", after he received a cease-and-desist letter from a company whose line of homeopathic products is actually called Växa. He insisted that any similarities between the two names was purely "axidental".

The segment was used as the culmination of the program's series finale; Death (who is referred to as Grimmy), who was intended to be the show's final guest, does not fall for Colbert's tricks and strangles him upon watching him actually cheat. This results in a struggle that ends with Colbert accidentally killing Death with his pistol Sweetness and becoming an immortal.

== Colbert Platinum (CP) ==
Colbert Platinum is a segment devoted to news regarding expensive and high-profile items, like personal submarines and $750,000 pens, which only the "super rich" could afford. In the introduction, Colbert reminds viewers that the segment is for billionaires "only," instructing "poor" millionaire viewers to change the channel. On October 20, 2008, in recognition of the 2008 financial crisis, the segment was replaced with Colbert Aluminum to cover the formerly wealthy (with Colbert telling viewers not to watch "if you haven't had a yacht repossessed in the last six months"). As of August 20, 2009, Colbert announced that the recession was over and that Colbert Platinum had been reinstated.

During the final edition of the segment on December 17, 2014, Colbert jokingly announced that he had sold the naming rights to The Colbert Report to the whisky brand Dewar's, renaming it The ColbDewar’s Repewars.

== Cold War Update ==
Cold War Update is a segment where Colbert dismisses "rumors" that the Cold War ended with the dissolution of the Soviet Union in 1991. The segment covers news from former Soviet Bloc countries, such as Cuba, North Korea, Russia, China, and Yugoslavia.

== The Craziest F#?king Thing I've Ever Heard ==
The Craziest F#?king Thing I've Ever Heard is a segment in which Colbert highlights a "bizarre" recent news item. It likens to The O'Reilly Factor's "The Most Ridiculous Item of the Day." Variants include "The Most Poetic F#?king Thing I've Ever Heard."

== The DaColbert Code ==
A parody of Dan Brown's The Da Vinci Code, "The DaColbert Code" is an occasional segment in which Colbert uses his mysterious code (actually an elaborate word association game) to uncover past and future events. This typically leads Colbert to form absurd conclusions, such as that Mike Myers was responsible for the Hurricane Katrina debacle — although in 2006 and 2009 he used the DaColbert Code to accurately predict the five top Oscar winners and shortly before the 2008 elections, the code repeatedly said that Barack Obama would be the next US president. The segment uses Leonardo da Vinci's Mona Lisa as its opening graphic, with Colbert's face edited in. On every occasion, he illustrates how it works by giving a test of it by predicting who killed John F. Kennedy, which at each time had led to a different suspect, including Jacqueline, Johnson, Nixon, and Kennedy himself.

== Democralypse Now! ==
Democralypse Now! was introduced during the 2008 presidential primaries and covered how the Democratic party was "destroying itself" through Hillary Clinton and Barack Obama's competing bids for the presidential nomination. The title is a portmanteau, combining the title of left-leaning progressive syndicated news program Democracy Now! with that of the film Apocalypse Now. (The opening sequence alludes to the film with the song "Ride of the Valkyries" and a cutout of John McCain's head quoting the film's famous line "The horror ... the horror!")

== Difference Makers ==
Difference Makers pays tribute to ordinary Americans whom Colbert deems to be making a difference, usually in promoting a passionate cause of dubious value, such as a woman who believes that teaching pole dancing is a feminist cause. The Difference Maker being profiled is described in heroic superlatives, and the segments feature patriotic background music, but the interviews shown invariably contradict the narrator's praising statements. This is one of the few segments in which Colbert does not feature at all, except as the narrator. The name bears a similarity to that of the NBC Nightly News human interest segment "Making A Difference".

== The Enemy Within ==
The Enemy Within is part of a series of segments labeled as Colbert Report Special Reports. The intro features a seemingly ordinary family taking a picture, only for aliens to pop out at the end. In the segment, Stephen uses a faux narration style to label a seemingly benign thing that has bended a law (like toddlers and unicycles) as an enemy.

== Formidable Opponent ==
For the Formidable Opponent, Colbert debates a topic against the only person he deems truly worthy of his opposition: himself. The segment gives the appearance that there are two Stephen Colberts, each facing the other, wearing different colored ties (usually a blue tie for the liberal Colbert and red for the conservative) and standing against different backdrops, an illusion attained through use of a green screen and chroma-key technology to change the color of Colbert's tie. One of the Colberts will generally take a more liberal position, while the other will take a more characteristic ultra-conservative view. The conservative Colbert will almost always win, generally posing an extremely unlikely hypothetical situation (either concerning special circumstances or hypothetical fallout), and using that for his justifications.

To date, the only time the 'liberal' Colbert has won was on the episode airing on November 4, 2009. In this episode, the 'liberal' Colbert called on Al Gore (who was there in person) to help him argue. The ultra-conservative Colbert then called his own version of Al Gore (also played by the real Al Gore). However, unlike the two debating Stephens, "both" Al Gores were of the same opinion, and convinced the conservative Colbert that they were right.

The final installment of Formidable Opponent aired on December 15, 2014. During a debate on the United States' use of torture — the same topic the two had debated during the show's first month — the liberal Colbert convinced his conservative counterpart to admit to being an imaginary character. As the segment ended, the conservative Colbert faded from existence, leaving only the liberal Colbert.

== Four Horsemen of the A-Pop-calypse ==
In the Four Horsemen of the A-Pop-calypse segment Colbert criticizes the media (radio, film, television, and books) for hastening the end of civilization. The name of the segment is a reference to the biblical characters of the Four Horsemen of the Apocalypse

== Freedom Trivia ==
These short messages frequently appeared on screen immediately before or after commercial breaks during the show's first season. The titles were typically portmanteaux, ranging from Fracts (Freedom Facts), to Friddles (Freedom Riddles), Franagrams (Freedom Anagrams) and Frnaps (Freedom Snaps). Drinking games and Freedom Trivia were also offered. The messages displayed were typically reflective of Colbert's exaggerated patriotism and inflated ego, for instance, "Did you know… In 1983, Stephen legally changed his middle name to 'Gettysburg Address'." They were discontinued soon after the commencement of the show's second season; the last Freedom Trivia message appeared in the January 26, 2006 episode of the Report.

== Indecision 2010: Revenge of the Fallen ==
Coverage of the 2010 midterm elections. Republicans were poised to re-take the House of Representatives and possibly the Senate. The segment subtitle is from the movie Transformers: Revenge of the Fallen. In this case, the "fallen" are the Republicans. Senator Mitch McConnell is shown as transforming from a turtle, and Minority Leader John Boehner is shown as transforming from an orange traffic cone.

== Monkey on the Lam ==
The opening graphic of Monkey on the Lam

Monkey on the Lam first appeared in August 2007 after a monkey escaped and went "on the lam" in Wisconsin. It has recurred occasionally, featuring stories of escaped monkeys, but mostly revolving around Colbert's disappointment upon the discovery that whatever story is being profiled has been resolved and will not need follow up, giving him no excuse to use the graphic featuring a monkey riding a lamb and firing a gun. A "Lobster Edition" of the segment was also featured, using the same graphic.

== Movies That Are Destroying America ==
Movies That Are Destroying America is a film review segment in which Colbert provides his opinions on recently released movies—often, he admits, without actually having seen anything more than the trailers (which he claims "give you the best part of the movie anyway"). This often leads to a humorous and mistaken impression of the movies being reviewed as Colbert viciously attacks films that most would consider to be benign (such as Over the Hedge and Pride and Prejudice), then praises a movie that conservatives have found objectionable (such as Brokeback Mountain). The segment has featured an "Awards Edition," a "Christmas Edition," and a "Summer Blockbuster Edition."

== Nailed 'Em ==
Nailed 'Em is a segment where Colbert covers a dubious triumph of "Order & Law". The segment involves someone breaking a minor or absurd law, and being brought to justice - for example, a man who was charged for allowing his spouse to eat from his plate at an all-you-can-eat restaurant. The segment is narrated by Colbert, who uses various dramatic rhetoric and strange metaphors to portray the law-breaker as a horrid criminal. In certain cases, Colbert follows up a story on this segment by "punishing" the "criminal" in a way that sarcastically underscores the absurdity of the crime for which they were "nailed." An example of this is when a young boy who loved to read had his library card revoked because his family lived in a different borough than their library of choice, and as such did not pay taxes that supported that library. He was featured on this segment, and Colbert responded by "forcing" the boy to read even more books, which he enacted by sending him a box full of books previously featured on his show, as well as a collector's box-set of the entire Harry Potter series, signed by Colbert himself.

== People Destroying America ==
In a similar style to that of Nailed 'Em and Difference Makers, People Destroying America features interviews surrounding a person who has committed some sort of trivial action or offense that Colbert deems to be "destroying America." The narration, usually read by Colbert, tends to describe the subject and their supposed offense in ominous superlatives which are invariably contradicted by the benign responses of the interviewees.

== Sam Waterston Says Things You Should Never Believe in a Trustworthy Manner ==
Sam Waterston Says Things You Should Never Believe in a Trustworthy Manner is a brief segment featuring Law & Order star Sam Waterston, who, as the title suggests, says things you should never believe in a trustworthy manner—things such as, "I'm from the future. Come with me if you want to live." It was introduced in January 2008 to illustrate the perils of relying on the "folksy" charms of then-presidential candidate and Law & Order costar Fred Thompson, who, to the distress of Colbert, was frequently hailed as a "Reagan figure" by the press. The segment ran three times (although Colbert claimed that he has proven the case "dozens of times"), and was discontinued after Thompson withdrew from his campaign for the presidency.

== Smokin' Pole: The Fight for Arctic Riches ==
Smokin' Pole: The Fight for Arctic Riches is a segment in which Colbert recaps news surrounding the world's nations laying claim to the resources of the Arctic Circle. This segment was originally titled "Arc! Who goes there?"

== Stephen Colbert's Balls for Kidz ==
Stephen Colbert's Balls for Kidz is an "educational" children's segment providing lessons on what Colbert deems to be important issues. It features a panel of four children interviewing adult "experts" whose typically absurd answers elicit bemused or horrified reactions from the young panel. The segment is filmed in two separate parts - field interviews with, or re-cut news footage of the "experts"; and the children's questions and reactions - which are then edited together to create the final piece.

== Stephen Colbert's Bears & Balls ==
A financial advice segment in the style of Mad Money, Bears and Balls features an over-sized red button that, when pressed, bleats out simplistic answers (frequently "Bees!") to finance-related questions, although Colbert will sometimes have to press it several times (each time emitting irrelevant and often comedic answers) before eliciting a response relevant to the question. The button occasionally gives an answer before Colbert even presses it.

== Stephen Colbert's Fallback Position ==
A segment in which Colbert searches for a job other than being a political pundit, such as a spy or a Thunderbird. In each of these segments, he interviews someone in the profession he is considering and asks them why he should choose that job. At the end of the interview, Colbert becomes convinced and tries out his fallback position.

== Stephen Colbert's Skate Expectations ==
Stephen Colbert's Skate Expectations: Kicking Ice and Taking Donations On the Slippery Slope Down the Icy Path to the Frozen Road Up to Vancouver '010 was a four-part series where Colbert would profile a sport in the 2010 Winter Olympics and try out for the corresponding US team. In each of the segments, skeleton, bobsledding, curling, and speed skating were all profiled. Luge was passed upon, due to it being considered the "gayest sport". The final segment featured the race between Colbert and Olympic skater Shani Davis, which was issued after Davis called Colbert "a jerk" for slamming Canada for not allowing the US speedskating team to practice in their arena.

== Stephen Colbert's Sport Report ==
Stephen Colbert's Sport Report (both pronounced with silent "t"s) was originally created to cover the Saginaw Spirit, an Ontario Hockey League junior ice hockey team whose secondary mascot, Steagle Colbeagle, was named after Colbert. The Spirit was the driving force of the segment at its inception, with Colbert recapping games, trash-talking upcoming opponents and advising the team's coach, but it later became a segment for general sports-related topics, once taking up an entire show on its own during the writer's strike.

== Stephen Hawking is Such an A-Hole ==
Presented as covering stories regarding astro physicist Stephen Hawking, by which Colbert portrays him in a light that suggests that he is a jerk.

== Stephen's Sound Advice ==
Stephen's Sound Advice is an advice segment during which Colbert offers absurdist remedies for problems such as taxes, power blackouts and identity theft.

== Tek Jansen ==
Fully titled: Stephen Colbert Presents: Stephen Colbert's Alpha Squad 7: The New Tek Jansen Adventures, the Tek Jansen shorts are animated adventures, purportedly of the main character of Colbert's (fictional) unpublished book, Stephen Colbert's Alpha Squad 7: Lady Nocturne: A Tek Jansen Adventure. The shorts could be said to be formulaic and over the top, with each one featuring Jansen taking part in heroic adventures, becoming amorous with every woman (human and otherwise) he meets, spouting one-liners, and falling into mortal danger in a cliffhanger ending. Invariably the real Colbert will react to the animated goings-on as if he, too, finds it as exciting as the narrator does.

== Thought for Food ==
In this recurring segment, Colbert presents food issues of the day like obesity, Coney Islands Hot Dog Eating Contest or new fast food offerings, targeting overboarding creations. Some quotes:

- Americans are always reaching for the stars...in our boxes of Lucky Charms.
- The Coney Island Hot Dog eating contest is the most patriotic observance of the Fourth of July short of a hot dog shooting contest.
- The Friendly's Grilled Cheese Burger Melt is "like your lunch, and two other people's lunches are having a three-way in your mouth.
- What if you had a grilled cheese sandwich, where the bread was two other grilled cheese sandwiches? And then, what if those two grilled cheese sandwiches also had grilled cheese sandwiches for bread, and so on, in an endlessly recursive series of dual-state cheese sandwich bread cheese sandwiches, extending into infinity? Prepare yourself nation, for I have invented the Mobius Melt: You'll never want to stop eating it, and in theory, you never could.

== ThreatDown ==
The ThreatDown is one of the show's longest running segments, listing the five biggest threats to Americans as identified by Stephen Colbert. Bears and robots (and, occasionally, robot bears) each frequently feature high on the list, either as their own entry or in connection with another entry. The threats posed are often a threat to no one but Colbert himself; for example, in January 2006, Colbert declared the Associated Press the number one threat to America for failing to credit him with the coining of the word "truthiness". Variations on this segment have included a GreatDown, in which Colbert listed the five greatest things in America; a Mini ThreatDown that featured a single "threat number .5", which Colbert had neglected to mention in the previous night's ThreatDown; a ShredDown, the title given to the guitar solo competition between Colbert and Chris Funk; a Threat StandDown, the antithesis of the ThreatDown, in which viewers are told to stop being afraid; and a number of themed ThreatDowns, including an all animal, science and technology, and most frequent threats editions.

The Xbox Live Arcade game Command and Conquer: Red Alert 3 Commander's Challenge has an achievement referencing the ThreatDown. You have to destroy all the bears in the level 'Number One Threat to America'

== Tip of the Hat, Wag of the Finger ==
Tip of the Hat, Wag of the Finger (Also referred to as "T-Dubs" or "Tip/Wag") is a segment in which Colbert expresses approval or disapproval of people or news items. It is not uncommon for Colbert to praise someone with a "Tip of the Hat", only to immediately turn around and condemn them with a "Wag of the Finger", sometimes for the same reason. In one such instance, Colbert lavish approval on then-Prime Minister of Australia John Howard for his criticism of Barack Obama, expressing agreement with the remarks, before showering Howard with abuse for daring to speak ill of an American citizen. He also has tipped his hat to Roe v. Wade, the abortion case, because he wants to be able to "Roe" across a lake in a boat, not "Wade" across and ruin his jacket.

== Un-American News ==
Un-American News is a segment in which Colbert reports on news from around the world.

== Where in the World and when in Time is Stephen Colbert Going to be in the Persian Gulf? ==
Where in the World and when in Time is Stephen Colbert Going to be in the Persian Gulf? was a segment that was created in response to both the cancellation of Matt Lauer's Today Show segment Where in the World is Matt Lauer? and Colbert's announcement that he would take his show to the Persian Gulf for a week of shows. The segment profiles a random region in the Persian Gulf using the Press Your Luck board. On the May 6, 2009 airing, Colbert changed the title to Where in the When and Who in How is Stephen Someone Going to be in the Something Where? per Pentagon's request, as it was stated that the segment's theme song gave out too much information about the location of where the show would be taping. On June 8, 2009, The Colbert Report aired from the Al-Faw Palace (Also known as the Water Palace), at Camp Victory, Baghdad, Iraq. He interviewed Gen. Raymond T. Odierno. Senator John McCain and President Barack Obama made special appearances, as did Presidents Bill Clinton and George H. W. Bush on day two.

See: Operation Iraqi Stephen: Going Commando 2009 Visit to Baghdad, Iraq for further information.

== Who's —ing Me Now? ==
Variants of this segment include Who's Honoring Me Now? and Who's Not Honoring Me Now?, where Colbert brings attention to a media outlet that is recognizing him for something, or failing to recognize him for something he feels he should be recognized for respectively, playing on the character's self-centered nature. Who's Attacking Me Now? parodies the tendency of conservative pundits to portray themselves as besieged by foes in order to rally supporters to their defence. Who's Riding My Coattails Now? is another variation.

== Words in the title sequence ==
During the title sequence for the show a bunch of words can be seen, usually words describing patriotic characteristics. The last word shown changes from time to time, sometimes changed specifically for a particular episode. (Line breaks are not indicated in this table.) With the current title sequence, Stephen is seen jumping over this last word while giving a sort of "battle-cry" and holding an American flag.

"Word/phrase"	General episode dates they appeared*	Notes
Grippy	Oct 05+	
Megamerican	Feb 06+	
Lincolnish	4/17/06+	
Superstantial	9/11/06+	A play on substantial. Start of season 2.
Freem	Jan 07+	See also 8/27/14.
Eneagled	2/26/07+	
Flagaphile	4/9/07+	
Good	7/16/07+	
Gutly	9/10/07+	
Warrior-poet	10/29/07+	
President Bush Have a Hotdog with Me	3/10/08-7/17/08	The previous week, Bush had a "hot dog date" with John McCain, and Stephen claimed this invitation was in his opening and he was snubbed.
Self-Evident	4/14/08-4/17/08	When visible, during convention coverage
Rock On!	7/16/08	Rush was a guest
Multi-Grain	7/21/08+	
Vote	10/15/08+	
Factose Intolerant	11/5/08+	A play on lactose intolerant
Colmes-Free Since 2009	1/6/09+	A reference to Alan Colmes, the liberal counterpart to Sean Hannity on the Fox News Hannity & Colmes show. Colmes was basically a prop for Fox to label the show as "Fair and Balanced", while Hannity did most of the talking. Colbert ran a "Colbert and Colmes" segment when Colmes retired from the show.
Seven-Inch Gangly Wrench	2/4/09	A nod to episode-long guest Steve Martin
Juice It!	2/5/09+	
Purple-Mounted	4/20/09+	A reference to "Purple mounted majesties" in the first verse of America the Beautiful
346X	5/4/09	In the interview of evening guest, it was brought up how J. J. Abrams liked to place hidden "clues" within his TV works which would somehow relate to some of the mysteries of the particular show. After it was hinted he had placed various "clues" in this episode, various random symbols/messages appeared, and the 346x can be inferred to be connected these clues, suggesting that clues together could form some sort of secret meaning.
Farewellison	9/17/09	A farewell to executive producer Allison
Fundit	9/22/09+	Fun + pundit
Applepious	1/4/10+	Beginning the new opening for HD
Libertease	3/29/10+	A portmanteau of "liberty" and "tease"
SCILF	6/1/10+	As in MILF
Flurpy	7/5/10	Stephen did the whole show sick, with several pre-taped segments, presumably feeling "flurpy"
TBD	8/2/10-8/4/10	To be determined
Überballed	8/5/10+	
Army of Won	9/8/10	Armed forces special part 1
Ready, Vet, Go!	9/9/10	Armed forces special part 2
Heterosapien	9/13/10+	[sic], despite the term "Homo sapiens" being two words and having an "s"
Cinco de Me-o	10/25/10	In honor of the 5-year anniversary of the Report, which happened during a week off
March Madness	10/26/10	Referring to the Rally to Restore Sanity and/or Fear to occur the following Saturday on October 30 in Washington, D.C.
Let Feardom Ring	10/27/10	Referring to the Rally to Restore Sanity and/or Fear to occur the following Saturday on October 30 in Washington, D.C.
When Scary Met Rally	10/28/10	Referring to the Rally to Restore Sanity and/or Fear to occur the following Saturday on October 30 in Washington, D.C.
Fearnix Rising	11/1/10	Referring to the Rally to Restore Sanity and/or Fear to occur the following Saturday on October 30 in Washington, D.C.
Hang 2010	11/2/10	Live Election Night special (with a Hawaii 5-0 theme)
Batter-Fried	11/3/10-11/4/10	
Downtrickler	11/8/10+	
Thankstaking	11/18/10	Last show before Thanksgiving
Christmust	11/29/10	First show after Thanksgiving
Deck the balls	12/7/10+	
Van Gogh-Getter	12/8/10	Episode focusing on Stephen's art project
Lad Liberty	1/3/11-2/3/11	
Yay-Hole	2/14/11-3/10/11	
Winning!	2/28/11	In reference to Charlie Sheen's outrageous interviews about the controversy of his frequent partying and then subsequent hiatus of his popular show, Two and a Half Men.
Strong Swimmer	3/21/11-4/14/11	
Word Hurdler	4/25/11-5/19/11	Literally referring to his jumping over these word phrases in the title sequence.
I'm in England	4/28/11	Part of Colbert's attempt to convince people he was in England to attend the British Royal Wedding of Prince William and Kate Middleton, which was to occur the following morning.
Win Laden	5/2/11	Referring to the news of the killing of Osama bin Laden, announced the previous night.
Pacman	5/31/11	Referring to the Super PAC, ColbertPAC (Colbert Super Pac), Colbert was trying to and subsequently did form while also relating to the popular arcade video game and brand Pac-Man
#hashtag	6/1/11	The lettering is actually in all lowercase when normally they are in all capital letters
#ivebeenhacked	6/2/11	Referred to Rep. Anthony Weiner's sexting scandal when Weiner accidentally tweeted an inappropriate photo of his penis, although it was inside his underwear (but still explicit, especially for a government official), with his Twitter account. At this time Weiner had claimed his account was hacked and then the hacker tweeted the photo. However Weiner did not outright deny it was a picture of him, stating he could not with, quote, "certitude" say it was a photo of him or not. Stephen then on his own Twitter account posted a string of 16 "tweets" with links to photos while stating similarly, "I cannot say with certitude that this is not part of my body." The photos were typically various outrageous and humorous pictures that obviously were not human body parts, male or otherwise, or made suggestive references to "inappropriate" parts of the (male) human body. He included in all these posts the hashtag: #ivebeenhacked. The letters in this phrase were all lowercase as well.
#iwasnthacked	6/6/11	This followed Anthony Weiner's press conference admitting the indecent photo posted on his Twitter account was indeed accidentally done by him and the photo was of him taken by himself. He also admitted that he was lying when he claimed his account had been hacked. The letters were again in all lowercase.
Your Ad Here	6/7/11+	
Less Talk, More Rock	6/20/11-6/23/11	Commemorating "Stephest Cobechella '011."
Tighty Righty	6/27/11+	
Freeberty	8/1/11-9/15/11	
From C to Silent T	9/20/11+	Referring to pronunciation of Stephen's last name and to the last line of the song, America the Beautiful ("From sea to shining sea").
Antonia Winslow Jones	11/8/11	One night only, with no explanation known to date (2017).
Consubstantial?	11/28/11; 11/29/11	Shown after the revised Catholic mass began to use this word during the profession of faith with the question mark signifying the confusion felt by many Catholics attending mass the previous Sunday. This topic and specifically this word were brought up and discussed on the November 29 Tuesday episode on Colbert's segment, "Yahweh or No Way."
Frankincensed	12/5/11-12/15/11	A portmanteau of sorts of frankincense and incensed
Caucus Tease	1/3/12	A play on the phrase of cock tease with the Iowa Republican Caucus that occurred that day (see also: Caucus, Iowa caucuses, United States presidential primary)
Star-Freckled	1/4/12-1/9/12	Reference to "star-spangled" as in The Star-Spangled Banner
Uptrodden	1/10/12-	As opposed to "downtrodden"
Coordinated	1/12/12	With Stephen's presidential campaign he had to turn his SuperPAC over to Jon Stewart and this was the last day he could coordinate with it.
Uncoordinated	1/16/12	See above.
Vote Herman Cain	1/17/12	Stephen could not get write-in votes in the South Carolina primary but since Herman Cain was out of the race and still on the ballot, Stephen urged people to use Cain to help gauge voter interest.
Oh, the Hermanity!	1/23/12	With "Herman Cain" getting 1% of the SC vote, Stephen decided to drop out. Play on radio coverage of the Hindenburg disaster.
EmPACted	1/30/12; 1/31/12	During a long toss, Stephen officially took his SuperPAC back from Jon Stewart.
#PrepareThem	2/1/12	During the show, Stephen urged viewers to tweet nasty attacks to Mitt Romney and Newt Gingrich to help them prepare for vicious campaign ads.
T.G.I.S.C.	2/2/12+	
O Brother, Where Wast I?	2/20/12	Referencing to the two canceled shows the previous week on Feb. 15 and 16 where Stephen reportedly left New York to see his mom who was reportedly ill though the illness wasn't disclosed. Feb. 20 was the first show for the next week and the first show back since his departure, which he addressed a little before the start of the actual show. The phrase is a direct reference to the movie and saying, O Brother, Where Art Thou?
National Manthem	3/26/12-5/10/12	A play on national anthem
Michelle N'Man	4/11/12	Michelle Obama was a guest. Possibly a reference to the Michelin Man, perhaps with the ill-punctuated intention of suggesting "Michelle 'n' man", i.e., Michelle Obama and (the) man (Stephen).
Hellaware	4/24/12	To go with Delaware primary coverage.
Smartyr	5/29/12-6/28/12	A portmanteau of smart(er) and martyr
Freedominant	7/16/12+	A portmanteau of freedom and dominant
Rock the Boat!	8/13/12	A series of references to music for the StePhest Colbchella '012 Rocktaugustfest during this week. Rock the boat and shiprocked refer to the festival's venue, the Intrepid. The third day's references "these go to eleven" from the movie This Is Spinal Tap and to the "'012" in the festival's name. Conservative bass is a play on the term "conservative base".
This One Goes to '012	8/14/12	A series of references to music for the StePhest Colbchella '012 Rocktaugustfest during this week. Rock the boat and shiprocked refer to the festival's venue, the Intrepid. The third day's references "these go to eleven" from the movie This Is Spinal Tap and to the "'012" in the festival's name. Conservative bass is a play on the term "conservative base".
Shiprocked	8/15/12	A series of references to music for the StePhest Colbchella '012 Rocktaugustfest during this week. Rock the boat and shiprocked refer to the festival's venue, the Intrepid. The third day's references "these go to eleven" from the movie This Is Spinal Tap and to the "'012" in the festival's name. Conservative bass is a play on the term "conservative base".
Conservative Bass	8/16/12	A series of references to music for the StePhest Colbchella '012 Rocktaugustfest during this week. Rock the boat and shiprocked refer to the festival's venue, the Intrepid. The third day's references "these go to eleven" from the movie This Is Spinal Tap and to the "'012" in the festival's name. Conservative bass is a play on the term "conservative base".
Hi, Mom!	9/4/12-9/7/12	One week of DNC coverage.
Flag, You're It!	9/17/12+	
Book 'em, Steve-O!	10/2/12-10/15/12	For a few weeks, starting on the release date of Stephen's new book. Reference to "Book 'em, Danno" from Hawaii 5-0.
Text REDCROSS To 90999	10/31/12; 11/1/12	For two shows after Hurricane Sandy. All on one line, with small caps for letters shown here in lowercase.
Vote!	11/5/12	One night only, with exclamation mark (not used in 2008).
Raging Election	11/6/12	Live election night special.
Scared Mittless	11/7/12	One night only, after Mitt Romney lost the election.
Stars and Gripes	11/8/12+	
One Tolkien over the Line	12/3/12	For "Tolkien week", the regular intro cut away to a special one, after the usual tagline.
Elbereth!	12/4/12	For "Tolkien week", the regular intro cut away to a special one, after the usual tagline.
Elendil!	12/5/12	For "Tolkien week", the regular intro cut away to a special one, after the usual tagline.
Precious!	12/6/12	For "Tolkien week", the regular intro cut away to a special one, after the usual tagline.
Claustrophelia	12/10/12+	Play on claustrophobia, misspelling of its opposite, claustrophilia.
Eleven Dark Thirty	1/7/13+	Play on the movie title of Zero Dark Thirty to refer to the East Coast airing time of new episodes for the show at 11:30 PM ET (the "dark" referring to the airings being at night, also the new episodes first air at 11:30 PM PT for the Pacific Coast feeds of The Colbert Report).
Sorry, Pitt!	1/21/13	Referring to Colbert's cancellation of his January 18 scheduled appearance to the University of Pittsburgh because he reportedly came down with the flu shortly after his last show of the week the previous day. Colbert's scheduled visit was for the students at the university who successfully completed the show's treasure hunt set out the previous Spring for colleges that formed student chapters of his Colbert Super PAC. The show is reportedly planning on rescheduling his visit.
As Seen on Twitter	2/19/13-3/7/13	
Me Pluribus Unum	3/25/13+	From E pluribus unum on the Great Seal of the United States and a common motto for the United States.
Mano-a-Bubba!	4/8/13	For Bill Clinton appearance (a special on the Clinton Global Initiative). A play on the phrase "mano a mano" and its frequent misinterpretation as a literal "man to man" that "mano" can be swapped out for a specific person or description of a person.
Vote!	5/6/13	One night only, since Stephen's sister was in a special election in SC to fill a congressional seat. (She lost.)
Young Sport	5/9/13	One night only for a Great Gatsby special; a play on the relevant phrase "old sport".
'Tis of Me	6/3/13+	
Hello, Handsome!	6/11/13	One night only, possibly in reference to the NSA's PRISM program covered that night and addressing a possible covert viewer of Stephen's activity.
	6/12/13-6/19/13	6/12 was an hourlong Paul McCartney special with no tagline, and 6/13 was a half-hour repeat of the same. Stephen's mother died on 6/12, and this explains not only the moment-of-silence blank but also the lack of new shows immediately following. The 6/19 episode was Stephen's first show since then; in the show's cold open he gave a straight-faced eulogy for his mother, and the word was kept blank.
Jump!	7/15/13-8/15/13	
Lollapawinna	8/6/13	A single night, for Colbchella '013, obvious play on Lollapalooza inverting the apparent "loser" in the festival name.
11:30 Cowboy	9/3/13+	A play on the title of the movie (and novel the movie was based on), Midnight Cowboy, with the show's first airings occurring at 11:30 ET (in the Eastern Time Zone, and 11:30 PT in the Pacific Time Zone), just a little before exact midnight.
For the Fat Lady	9/10/13	For Colbert's cOlbert's Book Club [sic] episode, a version of sorts of the popular and widely known Oprah's Book Club monthly book club review on The Oprah Winfrey Show, hence the capitalizing of the 'O' in Colbert and keeping the first 'C' lowercase and the strong emphasis in pronouncing the 'o' in his name to further tie it to Oprah Winfrey's name. The focus for this version of his book club review was on JD Salinger and the phrase is in reference to a key phrase in the 1957 novella, Zooey, which was published along with the short story Franny (1955) in the book Franny and Zooey in 1961.
Mazel Tov!	10/3/13	One night only, because with the government shutdown putting 24 weddings scheduled at national monuments in jeopardy, Stephen officiated one on that night's show instead.
20 More!	10/9/13	One night only, unknown reason
Ameriwill!	10/21/13+	
20% More Most	12/2/13+	
A-myrrh-ica	12/16/13+	
Not a Rerun!	1/6/14	One night only, after two weeks off
Mangerous!	1/7/14-1/8/14	Unclear meaning, possibly a late Christmas pun (manger + dangerous), or else maybe combining man + anger
People Chosen	1/9/14	One night only, in nonstandard font, after winning a People's Choice Award for best late night talk show host.
Meedom	1/13/14+	
Book 'em Steph-O	1/21/14	One night only, for a book segment, leading to a special intro; compare October 2012.
Gridiron Man	1/27/14-1/30/14	One week only (then back to "Meedom"), in reference to American football season.
Full Pipe	2/10/14+	Overlapping with Olympics season.
Ladies Watch Free	2/24/14+	
Public Frenemy	2/27/14	One night only, leading to a special intro; as this was a vaguely-Black History Month-themed show on the last possible day of the month, this is probably a play on the rap group Public Enemy and the neologism "frenemy".
Love Me!	3/24/14+	
Welcome Back, Carter	3/25/14	One night only, for Jimmy Carter guest appearance, along with reference to Welcome Back, Kotter
#NotCanceled	3/31/14	One night only, using small caps where lowercase letters are listed here; this is in reference to the #CancelColbert hashtag that came out of a brief controversy over a confusingly-attributed social media post.
Rocks and Garbage!	4/10/14	One night only, on the day Stephen's takeover of The Late Show with David Letterman was announced; the phrase is a reference to an old Letterman bit.
Hail Hydra	4/21/14	One night only, most likely in reference to Captain America: The Winter Soldier and a relevant guest.
97/96/95	5/13/14-5/15/14	The beginning of a countdown to the final episode of the Report, though it only went to 73 before the number was largely dropped. Each night had only a single number, of course, but this list clusters them for conciseness.
94/93/92/91	5/19/14-5/22/14	
90/89/88/87; 86/85/84/83; 82/81/80/79; 78/77/76/75	6/2/14-6/5/14	
74/73	7/14/14-7/15/14	The last use of the standard countdown.
Fear Goggles	7/16/14+	Countdown interrupted for several weeks. Pun on Beer goggles.
Defrost Nixon	8/4/14	One night only, for a Nixon special, punning on the Frost/Nixon interviews.
Colbore	8/26/14	One night only, since at the Emmy Awards the night before, Gwen Stefani became tongue-twisted and called the show "The Colbore Repore".
Exit in 57	8/27/14	One night only, resuming countdown briefly. In this episode, the title-sequence word "freem" from 2007 appeared on a Scrabble board of non-words.
Burglkaf	8/28/14	One night only, the fake word Stephen attempted to play in the Scrabble game on the previous episode.
Amber Waves of Gluten	9/2/14	One night only
Paid-triot	9/3/14+	
Denise!	9/2/14	One night only, unknown reason
For Frodo	9/17/14	One night only, with focus on Comic-Con and guest Viggo Mortensen.
News Rancor	9/30/14+	Last title sequence phrase to run for more than one week.
Solitocity	10/2/14	One night only, explained as a secret made-up word for rich people, after a rich person tried to keep people off the beach he lived near, wanting solitude from the common masses; the form of this word is probably meant to fit Stephen's style of mangling word construction.
Stop Fast-Forwarding DVR Now	11/3/14+	All on one line, stretching far back into the screen.
Boothiness	11/4/14	One night only, for live election night coverage, combining the iconic voting booth with Stephen's trademark "truthiness".
#hashtagwars (UNOFFICIAL)	11/6/14	Not technically part of The Colbert Report (which used the DVR tagline), but rendered in official style; for the last day of @midnight's New York City week, Chris Hardwick ran from his set to Colbert's set to insist on an appearance to fulfill a promise to introduce that day's Hashtag War, so Stephen introduced it along with an abbreviated clip of his main title sequence, with this tagline (in small or regular caps).
19 Bottles of Show on the Wall	11/10/14	One night only, with "on the wall" on a second line; this was the 20th-to-last episode, so as long as the current one is not on the wall, there were indeed 19 left in reserve. Clear play on the song 99 Bottles of Beer, and the last title sequence to refer to the number of episodes left.
Simulcast in Elvish	11/11/14-11/13/14	
Best Before: 12/18/14	11/17/14-11/18/14	Two nights only, all on one line, in reference to the date of the final episode.
Colbertucopia	11/19/14-11/20/14	Two nights only, in a smaller font, just before the Thanksgiving break.
Good to the Last Drop	12/1/14-12/4/14	Last title sequence phrase to run for more than one night.
Stephen's Greetings	12/9/14	One night only (12/8's episode, for those counting, had a special opening sequence).
4th Wise Man	12/10/14	One night only, with an errant extra space between "wise" and "man".
Desolation of Smug	12/11/14	One night only, reflecting in particular an "interview" with Smaug later in the show to go with the newest Hobbit movie.
End with Benefits	12/15/14	One night only, with a combination of large and small caps (matching the capitalization style to the left).
Bye Partisan (and unofficial Drink!)	12/16/14	One night only; during the show, a title sequence for a fake spinoff used the "Drink!" tagline.
The Shark	12/17/14	One night only, for penultimate episode, perhaps in reference to the moment at which shows are seen to be past their prime, a.k.a. "Jumping the Shark", especially since Stephen jumps (off) the tagline in the new sequence.
Grippest	12/18/14	One night only, most likely bookending the taglines by making the very first one, 2005's "grippy", superlative, even though it should probably be "grippiest".

*ordered by the episode date in which the word/phrase first appeared or the date of its only appearance

== The Wørd ==
The Wørd (Note: The slashed o is here merely a graphical styling, and the word "wørd" is pronounced by Colbert as the regular word "word".) is a frequently recurring segment during which Colbert chooses a word or phrase as a theme for a rant on a topical subject or news item, while messages displayed in a sidebar either highlight or sarcastically undercut what he is saying. This segment is a parody of The O'Reilly Factor segment Talking Points Memo and can also be likened to Mark Hyman's The Point conservative commentaries for Sinclair Broadcasting Group's former News Central concept. The Wørd was the longest running segment on the Colbert Report, having been a feature since the first episode on October 17, 2005. The first "The Wørd" was the originator of the now famous word/concept Truthiness.

As Colbert himself explains it:

I'm speaking a completely self-sufficient, standalone essay, hopefully comedic... The bullet points [excerpt] parts of what I said, or [comment] on what I just said. And the bullet points end up being their own character. Sometimes they're reinforcing my argument, sometimes they're countermanding my argument. It's a textual addition of jokes or satire to the verbal essay I'm doing at the moment.

In the episode aired on April 17, 2008, former Democratic presidential candidate John Edwards appeared on The Report and performed his own variation of The Wørd, called EdWørds. The April 22, 2010, episode, where Colbert attacked William Gheen for accusing Stephen's home state's senator Lindsey Graham of being a homosexual, featured a Bønus Wørd.

On the December 8, 2014, episode, President Barack Obama appeared on The Report and performed his own variation of The Wørd, called De¢ree.

On July 18, 2016, Colbert briefly revived his Colbert Report persona in an episode of The Late Show with Stephen Colbert covering the 2016 Republican National Convention, which included a The Wørd segment about "Trumpiness." On the July 27, 2016, episode, after stating that another company—implied to be Viacom—had threatened CBS over his use of aspects from The Colbert Report on Late Show, Colbert introduced a character that is the “identical twin cousin” of the Colbert character and also named Stephen Colbert, and brought back the segment once more as the W~~E~~RD. On September 18, 2025, with CBS and Viacom having since re-merged, Colbert brought back the Colbert persona and The Wørd, discussing the suspension of Jimmy Kimmel Live! due to comments regarding the assassination of Charlie Kirk.

== Wrist Watch ==
Following a July 2007 wrist injury, Colbert took up wrist injuries in general as a "pet cause" debuting Wrist Watch on July 31. The segment purports to expose "Hollywood's 'glamorization' of wrist violence." Generally the segment shows scenes from television and film featuring someone either hurting their arm or wrist in some way or having it removed. Colbert also wore and marketed "Wriststrong" gel bracelets, a parody of Lance Armstrong's Livestrong wristbands. The cast that he wore afterwards was removed on the show on August 23, 2007.

== Yahweh or No Way ==
In this segment, Colbert determines whether various news events were influenced by divine intervention (Yahweh) or run contrary to what he thinks would be God's will (No Way). One example was the news story stating that Mormons may have baptized President Barack Obama's relatives. Colbert labeled this "No Way", explaining that Mormons are teetotalers and Obama uses even the flimsiest excuse to have a beer. Another was the story of Dinosaur Adventureland, a Creationist dinosaur theme park whose owner claimed that he was not required to pay the $600,000 in payroll taxes he owed to the IRS because he was employed by God. Colbert labeled this "Yahweh", and then said that God should not be imagined as He was by Hollywood films such as King of Kings, but more like Mr. Six of the Six Flags television commercials. He also claimed that the manna that fell in the desert was funnel cake. Rarely, Colbert used a "Middle Way' or 'Maybewey, because he was unsure if an event was in "Yahweh or "No Way" territory, or in one case where he refused to take sides, "I Don't Know Weh."

== See also ==
- List of The Colbert Report episodes
- The Daily Show
- Comedy Central
- Stephen Colbert at the 2006 White House Correspondents' Dinner
- Colbert's Shred-Off with The Decemberists following Green Screen Challenge dispute
- Rally to Restore Sanity and/or Fear
- List of late-night American network TV programs
