= Garth Hewitt =

English priest and singer-songwriter (born 1946)

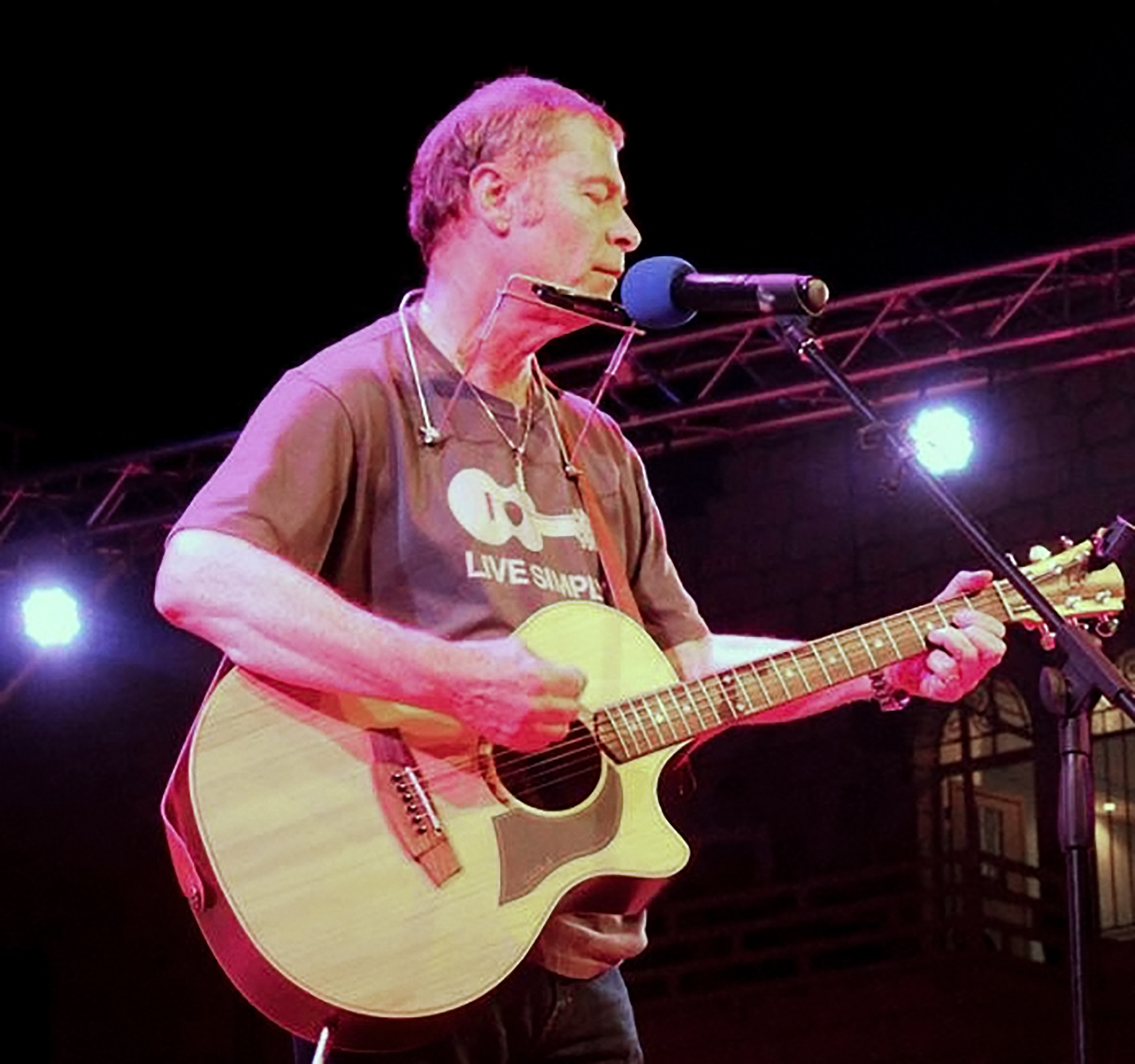
- At Bet Lahem Live Festival 2013
- Born: December 1946 (age 79)
- Occupations: Christian singer-songwriter; Anglican priest; author; activist; founder of Amos Trust
- Years active: Early 1970s–present
- Family: Gavin Hewitt (brother)
- Website: www.garthhewitt.org

Garth Hewitt (born December 1946) is an English Christian singer‑songwriter and Anglican priest, active since the early 1970s to the present. His commitment to social justice pervades his music and led him to found the human rights charity Amos Trust in 1985. He continues to raise awareness of social justice issues by recording and releasing albums, and also through writing books and articles.

== Background ==
The son of Anglican Reverend Thomas Hewitt and brother of broadcaster, Gavin Hewitt, Garth Hewitt attended St John's School in Leatherhead, Surrey. He graduated from St John's College, Durham in 1968 and from London College of Divinity in 1970. He began his ministry as curate at St Luke's Church in the Diocese of Canterbury and was ordained by the Archbishop of Canterbury, Michael Ramsey, in 1971. Performing and writing songs from an early age, in 1973 Hewitt's musical talent was noted by well-known hymn writer Timothy Dudley-Smith of the Anglican Church Pastoral Aid Society, which then employed him for the next six years to develop his music for the benefit of young people within the church. As his songs became known to Anglican audiences, he played in schools, churches, and larger venues. By age 40 he achieved recognition as "the elder statesman of the British gospel music scene."

== Musical career ==
=== Working with Cliff Richard ===
An early partnership with Sir Cliff Richard was formed in 1977 when Hewitt wrote the music for a film about third world poverty, in which Richard performed, called A World of Difference. Backed by the Christian relief agency, Tearfund, the film featured Hewitt singing the title song "A World of Difference." The following year Richard provided backing vocals on Hewitt's album I'm Grateful. A year later, he produced Hewitt's album Did He Jump... or Was He Pushed? Richard subsequently covered two tracks from that record. First was the single issued from it, "Did He Jump," which did not chart. Hewitt was ambivalent about its release in any event since the long playing album was his preferred medium as he later recalled. However, Richard recorded the song live at the Hammersmith Odeon in 1979, when he spoke of Hewitt as "a fine singer-songwriter." The second track was "A World of Difference", which Richard knew from the Tearfund film. He sang it at the Live Aid after‑party at a nightclub in London in 1985. With backing vocals by DJ Kenny Everett, Richard recorded Hewitt's 1981 track "Under the Influence" for the B side of his single "The Only Way Out" in 1982. Richard later added the track to his album Now You See Me, Now You Don't on the album's re‑release in 2002.

=== Other collaborations and tours ===
Hewitt has also worked with an eclectic array of singers, arrangers, and instrumentalists on his records. They include fellow Christian musicians Bryn Haworth and Paul Field, pedal steel guitarist B. J. Cole, gospel singer Jessy Dixon, protest singer-songwriter Martyn Joseph, vocalist Denise Ogbeide, contemporary Christian artist Randy Stonehill, producer and world musician Ben Okafor, Palestinian singer Reem Kelani, folk-rock singer Mark Heard, experimental composer Paul Pilot, pianist and singer Duke Special, and renowned harpsichordist Penelope Cave.

Hewitt has regularly toured in Germany, Switzerland, Spain, Poland, US, Belgium, Netherlands, France, Sweden, Norway, Denmark, Finland, Ireland, New Zealand, Australia (once), and Canada (once). He has performed in venues ranging from high security prisons in Singapore and Bolivia to the Grand Ole Opry in Nashville, after being invited by country singer George Hamilton IV.

=== International recognition ===
Hewitt sang at several events organised by American evangelist Billy Graham: in 1973 at the UK Spree '73 festival; in 1975 at Eurofest '75, held in Heysel Stadium, Brussels; and in 1980 in evangelistic campaigns at Oxford and Cambridge universities.

In 1983 Hewitt won wide acclaim in the developing world upon the release of his Indian and African influenced album, Road to Freedom. It featured the track "Namirembe" about a hill in Kampala, Uganda. The track became so popular in that country that the people of Uganda nicknamed him "Namirembe."

In 1988 he was named International Artist of the Year at the Gospel Music Association's Dove Awards in Nashville. The award was for what the judges said was his many years of commitment to the disadvantaged. One song specifically mentioned was Hewitt's "A Child is the Future" with its concern for children born into poverty.

== Social activism, ministry, music ==
Having been influenced in his early thinking and theology by Martin Luther King Jr, Archbishop Trevor Huddleston, Canon John Collins, Monsignor Bruce Kent among others, Hewitt's invitation by Tearfund to travel with the organisation to Haiti in 1978 confirmed the direction of his music and ministry. From that point he began to focus his understanding of the role of a priest in the context of activism and protest.

Hewitt traces his awareness of social issues to a sermon he heard as a teenager by Martin Luther King Jr when King was guest preacher at London's St Paul's Cathedral. King, who was on his way to Oslo, Norway, to receive the Nobel Peace Prize, attracted a congregation of more than 4,000 that afternoon. He had been invited by another of Hewitt's exemplars, the canon of St Paul's, John Collins, and he spoke on "The Three Dimensions of a Complete Life"—the love you should have for yourself, the love you should show to your neighbour, and love for God.

An example of Hewitt using his lyrics for protest and awareness-raising was his song, "You Are Loved Stephen Lawrence", written on the murder of 18-year-old Stephen Lawrence, killed in a racist attack in Eltham, London, in 1993. Stephen's mother Doreen Lawrence selected the song as a choice when she appeared on BBC Radio 4's Desert Island Discs. Another instance was his song for American peace activist Rachel Corrie on her death in Gaza in 2003, "Light a Candle in the Darkness."

In 1989 Hewitt controversially gave open support to Viraj Mendis, a Sri Lankan refugee who claimed sanctuary in a Manchester church in an attempt to avoid deportation from the UK. While Mendis was there, Hewitt gave a concert in the church to highlight what he considered to be the moral issues.

In 1989–90 Hewitt toured with poet Stewart Henderson and mime artist Geoffrey Stevenson in an interdisciplinary and multimedia show called Broken Image. Sponsored by Tearfund, the production focussed on the plight of the poor in the Philippines. All three performers addressed the issue of poverty, with the Church Times reporting in its review that Hewitt's songs were "full of peace and justice slogans, which had the audience singing along."

=== Greenbelt ===
In 1974 Hewitt played at the first Greenbelt Festival and was subsequently deeply involved in its development from a Christian music festival to a broad annual Christian celebration of the arts, faith, and justice.

=== TV ===
In 1979 Granada TV's weekly programme Pop Gospel selected Hewitt's song "That's Why We're Here" as its theme tune. The following year, Hewitt presented the programme, a light religious musical show aimed at young people, with singer Bernie Flint. In June 1981 Hewitt joined Southern TV's short-lived religious affairs show, Royle Progress, presented by Reverend Roger Royle. Hewitt's role was to place "the emphasis on youth and music", which he did each week until the programme ceased a month later.

=== Amos Trust ===
In 1985 Hewitt founded the human rights charity Amos Trust to support his visits to projects in parts of the world where funding would not be available to finance his trips. It had a particular mission to encourage musicians in developing nations to raise their voices in ways that were true to their respective cultures.

Hewitt named his charity after the Old Testament prophet Amos, who in Amos 5:24 relates God's command to let justice roll on like a river. The trust took this as its credo, the text particularly resonating with Hewitt as it comes immediately after God's rejection of music—the only place in the Bible where this occurs apparently—when it is produced by musicians who ignore the poor.

In the 1990s Amos Trust began organizing trips to the international projects it supports, to introduce people to the problems in different countries, with a view both to enlarging a global understanding of poverty and encouraging activism when visitors returned to the UK.

Hewitt served as director from the trust's inception until 2011 when the Reverend Chris Rose was appointed to the role of director, while Hewitt retained the position of founder. In his period as director he was Guildford Diocesan World Affairs and World Mission Advisor from 1994 to 1996. Toward the end of this advisory role he wrote a book for Lent called Pilgrims & Peacemakers, which by way of featuring Palestinian and Jewish mediators, espoused his progressive approach to Christian mission.

=== Christian Aid ===
In 1996 Hewitt started a new job with Christian Aid as Head of the London and South East Team and Area Coordinator for the Westminster area. During his time with the charity he released a musical, The Feast of Life, for churches to perform during Christian Aid Week to bring attention to the causes supported by the agency. It didn't consist entirely of new material. Some songs were recycled from previous albums. Nevertheless, the musical was widely successful. It was soon performed not only during Christian Aid Week but throughout the year. With churches still reviving the show, it proved a lasting legacy of Hewitt's tenure at Christian Aid. He left the London and South East Team after six years.

=== All Hallows-on-the-Wall ===
Between 1997 and 2012, at All Hallows-on-the-Wall Church in central London, Hewitt was Guild Vicar, so-called because the church retained links with the ancient guilds, or livery companies as they are also known, found in the City of London. On 4 May 2010, Hewitt was made a freeman of one of these guilds, the Worshipful Company of Carpenters, for leading their annual election day service at All Hallows-on-the-Wall.

Catering to the traditions of the carpenters was part of a very wide ministry Hewitt conducted at All Hallows that also embraced peace, justice, and art. At one point he brought five charities under the church's roof: Amos Trust, Greenbelt Festivals, Stamp Out Poverty, Art and Christianity Enquiry (ACE), and the Wall Gallery, also known as Wallspace, which they described as "a spiritual home for the visual arts."

== Interests ==
=== Palestine ===
Hewitt's interest in the work of peacemakers in Israel/Palestine began when he read the best-selling book, Blood Brothers, by the Palestinian-Israeli Abuna, Elias Chacour, and after inviting him to speak to the Greenbelt Festival in 1988. In respect of his support for Palestinians working for peace, on 11 June 2006, the Bishop of Jerusalem, Riah Abu El Assal, made Hewitt a canon of St George's Cathedral in Jerusalem. In 2006, the House of Poetry in Ramallah awarded Hewitt a certificate of appreciation for his songs on Palestine, and in 2007, British relief and development agency, Interpal, honoured him during a two-day conference, "Partners for Peace and Development for Palestine", for his commitment to the Palestinian people. Hewitt is a patron of Palestine Solidarity Campaign. And of ABCD Bethlehem (Action around Bethlehem Children with Disability). His writings on the Palestinians include the book Occupied Territories, which one critic describes as "passionate but level-headed."

=== Nicaragua ===
Hewitt cites as one of his influences Gustavo Parajón, Nicaraguan Baptist pastor and founder of the Council of Protestant Churches of Nicaragua (CEPAD). Through CEPAD, Amos Trust supports various projects in Nicaragua involved with sustainable community development.

=== Street children ===
Hewitt's earliest encounters with street children were in Brazil, which inspired his protest song "Little Outlaws, Dirty Angels" on his Lonesome Troubadour album in 1991. This led to Amos Trust supporting projects in South Africa: initially Isaiah 58 in East London, then Umthombo in Durban, and eventually Amos Trust's involvement with Umthombo in setting up the Street Child World Cup in 2010.

=== Dalits ===
While at Christian Aid, Hewitt travelled to India to research an album about Dalits, the most marginalised caste in the country. Accompanied by Paul Field, the resulting 11 songs became their album Dalit Drum. Later, Amos Trust became involved in supporting various educational programmes with Dalits in Tamil Nadu in Southern India.

=== Chartists ===
Acknowledging the legacy of previous Christian protesters, Hewitt recorded songs from an 1845 hymnal compiled by the Chartists, who campaigned for social justice in Victorian Britain. Containing lyrics but no tunes, the hymn book was discovered by a lecturer in nineteenth-century writing at Manchester University, Mike Sanders, who discussed its egalitarian content in 2012. Following contact with Sanders, Hewitt put music to the lyrics in a unique album, Liberty is Near!, the first recording of Chartist hymns.

== Writings ==
Among his writings are two works of autobiography. The first of these was Nero's Watching Video, a summary of his first few years of world travel, issued in 1987. This was followed by a more substantial reflection on his life and career, Against the Grain, published in 2018.

== Collected works ==
=== Albums ===
- The Lion and the Lamb (1973, Myrrh)
- I Never Knew Life Was in Full Technicolor (1974 Myrrh)
- Love Song For the Earth (1976 Myrrh)
- I'm Grateful (1978 Myrrh)
- Did He Jump ... or Was He Pushed? (1979 Patch/EMI)
- The Best of Garth Hewitt (1980 Myrrh)
- Under the Influence (1981 Marshalls)
- Record of the Weak (1982 Tearfund)
- Road To Freedom (1983 Myrrh)
- Mud on My Eyes (1984 Scripture Union)
- The Bride (1984 Scripture Union)
- Alien Brain (1985 Myrrh)
- Portfolio (1987 Myrrh)
- The Greatest in the Land (1987 Scripture Union)
- Scars (1988 Myrrh)
- Un Niño es el Futuro (1991 De La Raiz)
- Lonesome Troubadour (1991 Myrrh)
- Memories (1992 Myrrh)
- Blood Brothers with Ben Okafor (1992 What? Records)
- I Shall Be Made Thy Musique with Penelope Cave (1992 Eagle)
- Walk the Talk (1993 Myrrh)
- Stronger Than the Storm (1995 Myrrh)
- The Greatest Gift (1995 Bible Lands)
- Journeys 1, The Holy Land (1996 Myrrh)
- Journeys 2, Africa (1996 Myrrh)
- Journeys 3, Asia (1997 Myrrh)
- Journeys 4, Latin America (1998 Myrrh)
- Gospel Singer (1999 ICC)
- The Dalit Drum with Paul Field, Christian Aid (2001 ICC)
- 30 double album (2003 ICC)
- The Road Home with artist Daniel Bonnell (2003 SPCK)
- Stealing Jesus Back (2006 ICC)
- Journeys – Africa – Wings of Love Over Africa (2007 Amos)
- Bethlehem, Palestine (2008 Amos)
- Gaza, Palestine (2009 Amos)
- Moonrise (2010 Amos)
- Justice Like A River (2012 Kevin Mayhew)
- Liberty is Near! (2013 Kevin Mayhew)
- Something For the Soul (2014 GingerDog Records)
- Songs From the Fifth Gospel (2014 GingerDog Records)
- Peace at Christmas (2016 GingerDog Records)
- Against the Grain double album (2018 GingerDog Records)
- My Name Is Palestine (2019 GingerDog Records)
- Easter Revolution (2022 GHF Publications)

=== Singles ===
- "That's Why We're Here" (1978 Word Music UK)
- "Did He Jump" (1979 Patch/EMI)
- "I Can Hear Love" / "Come Out Fighting" (1980 PYE)
- "The Hungry Wind" (1982 Blue Moon)
- "Litany for Africa" (1986 Greenbelt)
- "Chain of Love" (1990 CMS)
- "My Name Is Palestine" (2019 GHF Publications)

=== Musicals ===
- The Feast of Life (1999 Authentic)

=== DVDs ===
- Wide Open Arms (2016 GHF Publications)
- Garth Hewitt – Live in Sheffield (2018 GHF Publications)

=== Books ===
- Nero's Watching Video (1987 Hodder)
- Pilgrims & Peacemakers (1996 Bible Reading Fellowship)
- A Candle of Hope (1999 Bible Reading Fellowship)
- The Road Home (2003 SPCK)
- Towards the Dawn (2005 SPCK)
- Making Holy Dreams Come True (2006 SPCK)
- Holy Dreams to Feed the Soul (2007 SPCK)
- Bethlehem Speaks (2008 SPCK)
- Occupied Territories (2014 IVP)
- Against the Grain (2018 GHF Publications)
- Easter Revolution Companion Booklet (2022 GHF Publications)

=== Songbooks ===
- The Garth Hewitt Songbook (1975 Word Music UK)
- The Champion (1979 Scripture Union)
- Mud on My Eyes (1984 Scripture Union)
- Dance on Injustice (1987 Scripture Union)
- Songs of Justice and Peace Vol 1 (1987 Word Music UK)
- Chain of Love (1990 CMS)
- Songs of Justice and Peace Vol 2 (1991 Amos Trust)
- Walk the Talk (1993 Amos Trust)
- Justice Like a River (2012 Kevin Mayhew)

== Memoir ==
- Hewitt, Garth (2018). Against the Grain: Choices on a Journey with Justice. London: GHF Publications. ISBN 978-1-5272-1965-6.
