= Eurofest '75 =

European International Youth Conference

Eurofest '75 was an International Youth Conference and Evangelistic Campaign organised by the Billy Graham Evangelistic Association held in Brussels, Belgium. It followed on from Spree '73 held in London. The General Secretary for both was Harvey Thomas.

Graham preached from Phillipians teaching on the connections between joy and prayer - two of the book's major themes. He insisted: "Young people should learn to pray."

The festival took place from 24 July - 2 August 1975, in the Centenary Palace Exhibition Halls whilst the public Campaigns were in the near-by Heysel Stadium, Brussels.

== Personnel ==
Many well-known evangelical figures first came to prominence at the festival, such as Luis Palau, Bishop Festo Kivengere, Annie Vallotton the French-Swiss Good News Bible illustrator and Manfred Siebald the German singer-songwriter. Vallotton gave a talk each morning before the Bible expositions, that she illustrated on an overhead projector, fitted with an acetate scroll.

=== Committees ===
==== Executive committee ====
Chairman: Werner Bürklin (Federal Germany)

Vice-Chairman: Brian Kingsmore (Ireland)

Secretary: Elon Svanell (Sweden)

Richard Bewes (U.K)

Ingulf Diesen (Norway)

Juan Gili (Spain)

Gien Karssen (Netherlands)

Elio Milazzo (Italy)

Richard Møller Petersen (Denmark)

Herbert Müller (Federal Germany)

Jean-Jacques Weiler (France)

==== Programme Committee ====
Chairman: Richard Bewes (U.K.)

Vice-Chairman/Training: Arnold van Heusden (Netherlands)

Vice-Chairman/Music: Svante Widen (Sweden)

Maisie Adamson (Ireland)

Ruth Büchli (Switzerland)

Hermogenes Fernandez (Spain)

Herbert Müller (Federal Germany)

Yves Perrier (France)

Paul Vandenbroeck (Belgium)

==== Prayer Committee ====
Chairlady: Eliana Vuffray (Switzerland)

Moises Gomes (Portugal)

Sheila Stone (U.K.)

Veli-Pekka Toiviainen (Finland)

Dora Winston (Belgium)

=== Administration ===
General Director: John Corts

General Secretary: Harvey Thomas

==== Full-time co-ordinators ====
German-speaking Europe: Hans-Jürgen Beulshausen

Iberia: Hermogenes Fernandez

Denmark and Norway: Peter Hofman-Bang

Finland and Sweden: Peo Lannerö

Greece and Italy: Salvatore Loria

Ireland: Cassells Morrell

Netherlands: Bouke Ottow

Great Britain: Tony Stone

French-speaking Europe: Jean-Jacques Weiler

The Co-ordinators were also supported by more than 3,000 district and local voluntary representatives.

=== Developers ===
The morning programmes and materials were developed by:-

George Brucks (Netherlands)	"Developing a Lifestyle"
Tom Houston (U.K.)	"Building the Relationship with God"
Anton Schulte (Federal Germany)	"Going Home"
Ralph Shallis (France)	"Understanding the Fellowship"
Gilbert Kirby (U.K.)	"Knowing Salvation"
Alfred Kuen (France)	"Evangelism"
Don Stephens (Switzerland)	"Spiritual Warfare"

=== Expositors ===
Anglican Bishop Festo Kivengere (Uganda) and evangelist Luis Palau (Argentina & USA) led the Bible expositions. The handbook labelled Palau "Mexico" as he recently had been a Missionary there.

=== Seminar teams ===
Apostolos Bliates (Greece); George Brucks (Netherlands); Alain Burnand (Switzerland); Alain Choiquier (France); Gert Doornenbal (Netherlands); Knut Magne Ellingsen (Norway); Bill Freel (U.K.); Juan Gili (Spain); Charles Guillot (France); Martin Homann (Federal Germany); Tom Houston (U.K.); Brian Kingsmore (N. Ireland); Alfred Kuen (France); Kalevi Lehtinen (Finland); Johannes Lukasse (Belgium); Elio Milazzo (Italy); Yves Perrier (France); Bernhard Rebsch (Federal Germany); Dagfinn Saether (Norway); Anton Schulte (Federal Germany); Hugh Silvester (U.K.); Emmanouel Smpraos (Greece); Theo Sorg (Federal Germany); Don Stephens (Switzerland); Billy Strachan (U.K.); Don Summers (U.K.); Paul Vandenbroeck (Belgium); Virgilio Vangioni (Spain); Jim Wilson (Switzerland).

Artist	Annie Vallotton	Switzerland
Children's programme	Ursel Nawak	Federal Germany
Counsellors co-ordinators	Ingulf Diesen	Norway
Counsellors co-ordinators	Gien Karssen	Netherlands
Euroshop manager	Jean Wilson	U.K.
Lonely hearts patrol	Vijay Menon	U.K.
Masters of ceremonies	Werner Burklin	Federal Germany
Masters of ceremonies	Arnold van Heusden	Netherlands
Masters of ceremonies	David Pope	U.K.
Masters of ceremonies	Bernd Schlottoff	Federal Germany
Prayer co-ordinator	Eliane Vuffray	Switzerland
Production manager	Harvey Thomas	U.K.
Witnessing co-ordinator	Claude Lefebvre	Belgium

== Music ==
The Finnish group Treklangen sang the theme song: "I don't know what you came to do, but I came to praise the Lord" by Dallas Holm. They recorded on the Pilot label in English and Swedish as well as their own language.

One of the special guests was Cliff Richard. He was secured for the conference too late to be mentioned in the handbook. Choralerna, who had featured at Spree '73, performed their gospel oratorio Living Water. The Dutch gospel band 'The Lighters' also gave several performances.

The organisers wanted to cater to all tastes, so they invited a selection of groups and singers from all over Europe.

Les Ambassadeurs	France
The Advocates	U.K.
Lois Buckley	U.K.
Choralerna	Sweden
Croix de Camargue	Switzerland
Garth Hewitt	U.K.
Pelle Karlsson	Sweden
The Lighters	Netherlands
Manfred Siebald	Federal Germany
Evie Tornquist	Norway
Treklangen	Finland
Trio Emmanuel	France
Voces de Nueva Vida	Spain
Emanuel Wieser	Austria

The resident staff musician was Peter Bye (U.K.) who, with his band and vocal group, led the morning music spots and accompanied the other sessions.

The handbook in each Eurofest language included a songbook of 28 songs. The words for most of the songs were translated, if not original, and a further six remained untranslated. The non-English songs in the English handbook were:

6. GUD JEG VIL VÆRE KRISTEN (Norwegian)

16. MIJN VADER, DANK U WEL (Dutch)

17. OH, JOVENES VENID (Spanish)

20. QUAND LES MONTAGNES (French)

22. SIGNOR T'ADORIAMO (Italian)

26. VERGISS NICHT ZU DANKEN (German)

The non-English handbooks did not translate number 21. SEEK YE FIRST, as it had recently been written (1973) by Karen Lafferty.

== Languages ==
Delegates registered in one of seven official languages. On sign-in they were given a handbook in that language and a colour coded wristband for access to the site. The languages were: English - pink; French - blue; German - yellow; Italian - green; Dutch - white; Spanish - orange and Norwegian - violet.

There were seminars in each of the seven Eurofest languages, as well as in Finnish and Greek. Most seminars had a "Teach Team" of two people that shared the teaching.

The meetings were held in the main hall that was divided into eight language areas with wide walkways in between. They were simultaneously translated from English into the other six official languages delivered by overhead speakers in the language areas. English speakers were told to sit anywhere so that their area could be used for on-the-ground simultaneous translation into the additional seminar languages of Finnish and Greek as well as Swedish and other languages.

== Minigroups ==
All participants were assigned a "minigroup" of 8 - 10 people with a leader to work through each day's Worksheet based on the seminar and pray together. "Minigroup" was the organisers' term for cell group. Some worksheet questions required further subdivision (in half or in partners) to achieve the best group dynamic for the task.

== Daily Timetable ==
	Thursday 24 July	Friday 25 July	Saturday 26 July	Sunday 27 July	Monday 28 July	Tuesday 29 July	Wednesday 30 July	Thursday 31 July	Friday 1 August	Saturday 2 August
Daily Theme		Knowing Salvation	Building the Relationship with God	_____	Understanding the Fellowship	Developing a Lifestyle	Spiritual Warfare	Evangelism	Going Home	Facing the Future
07.00 - 09.00		Quiet Time, Breakfast and Music								
09.00 - 10.30		Bible Exposition (Luis Palau)	Bible Exposition (Festo Kivengere)	_____	Bible Exposition (Festo Kivengere)	Bible Exposition (Luis Palau)	Bible Exposition (Festo Kivengere)	Bible Exposition (Luis Palau)	Bible Exposition (Festo Kivengere)	Bible Exposition (1) (Luis Palau) Bible Exposition (2) (Festo Kivengere) Minigroups Prayer
*				10.30 Worship Service						Bible Exposition (1) (Luis Palau) Bible Exposition (2) (Festo Kivengere) Minigroups Prayer
11.00 – 13.00		Seminar	Seminar	10.30 Worship Service	Seminar	Seminar	Seminar	Seminar	Seminar	Bible Exposition (1) (Luis Palau) Bible Exposition (2) (Festo Kivengere) Minigroups Prayer
*										
14.00 – 18.00		Optional ^{+}	Optional	_____	Optional	Optional	Optional	Optional	Optional	Clear Up
14.00 – 18.00		Optional ^{+}	16.00 Campaign	16.00 Campaign	Optional	Optional	Optional	Optional	Optional	16.00 Campaign
*										Close
20.00 – 22.00	Welcome Rally (Participants only)	Campaign	International Gospel Music Festival	Together in Music	Campaign	Campaign	Campaign	Campaign	Campaign	
*										
22.30 - 23.30	_____	Late Night Special	_____	_____	Late Night Special	Late Night Special	Late Night Special	Late Night Special	Late Night Special	

=== ^{+}Optional programme ===
Options offered for the 14.00 - 18.00 slot included:

- Joining a witnessing team traveling into the city centre
- Joining prayer groups for the witnessing teams
- Special interest seminars (detailed below)

==== Special interest seminars ====
Personnel	Title	Time
Apostolos Bliates (Greece)	"Leading a Youth Group"	first Saturday 14.00
Pieter Boomsma (Netherlands)	"The Young Christian in the Local Church"	Wednesday 16.00
Stuart Briscoe (U.S.A.)	"Sex and Marriage"	Monday 16.00
Karl Erik Freed (Sweden)	"Helping New Christians"	first Friday 14.15
Gilbert Kirby (U.K.)	"The Occult"	Monday 14.15
Bill Latham (U.K.)	"The Christian Viewpoint on Social Problems"	Tuesday 14.30
Hans Rookmaaker (Netherlands)	"Reaching Thinking People"	Wednesday 14.15
Hugh Silvester (U.K.)	"Giving a Talk"	second Friday 16.00
John Stott (U.K.)	"The Calling and Qualifications of a Minister"	Thursday 16.00
Svante Widen (Sweden)	"The Christian and Music"	first Friday 16.00
A panel including bishop Festo Kivengere and Luis Palau	Question and answer plenary session	second Friday 14.15

Stott's seminar on leadership was originally intended for "pastors or those interested in full-time service". Graham believed that Stott deserved a wider audience, so he up-graded it to a plenary session that he chaired so that "everyone could be present".
