= James Byres =

Scottish architect, antiquary and dealer in Old Master paintings and antiquities

James Byres of Tonley FRSE FSAScot FSA (1733 — 1817) was a Scottish architect, antiquary and dealer in Old Master paintings and antiquities.

== Biography ==
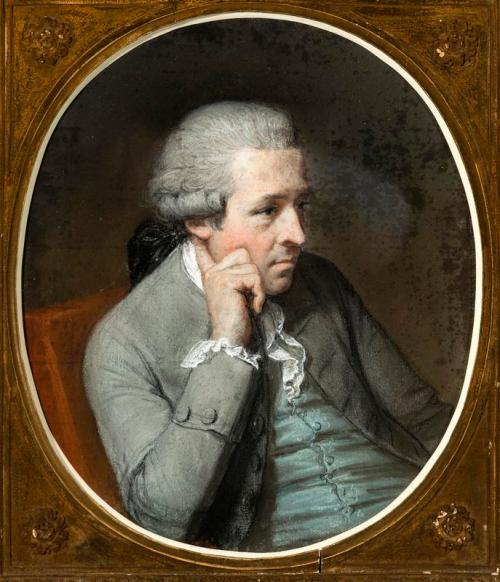
Portrait of James Byres by Hugh Douglas Hamilton, ca.1782-1791

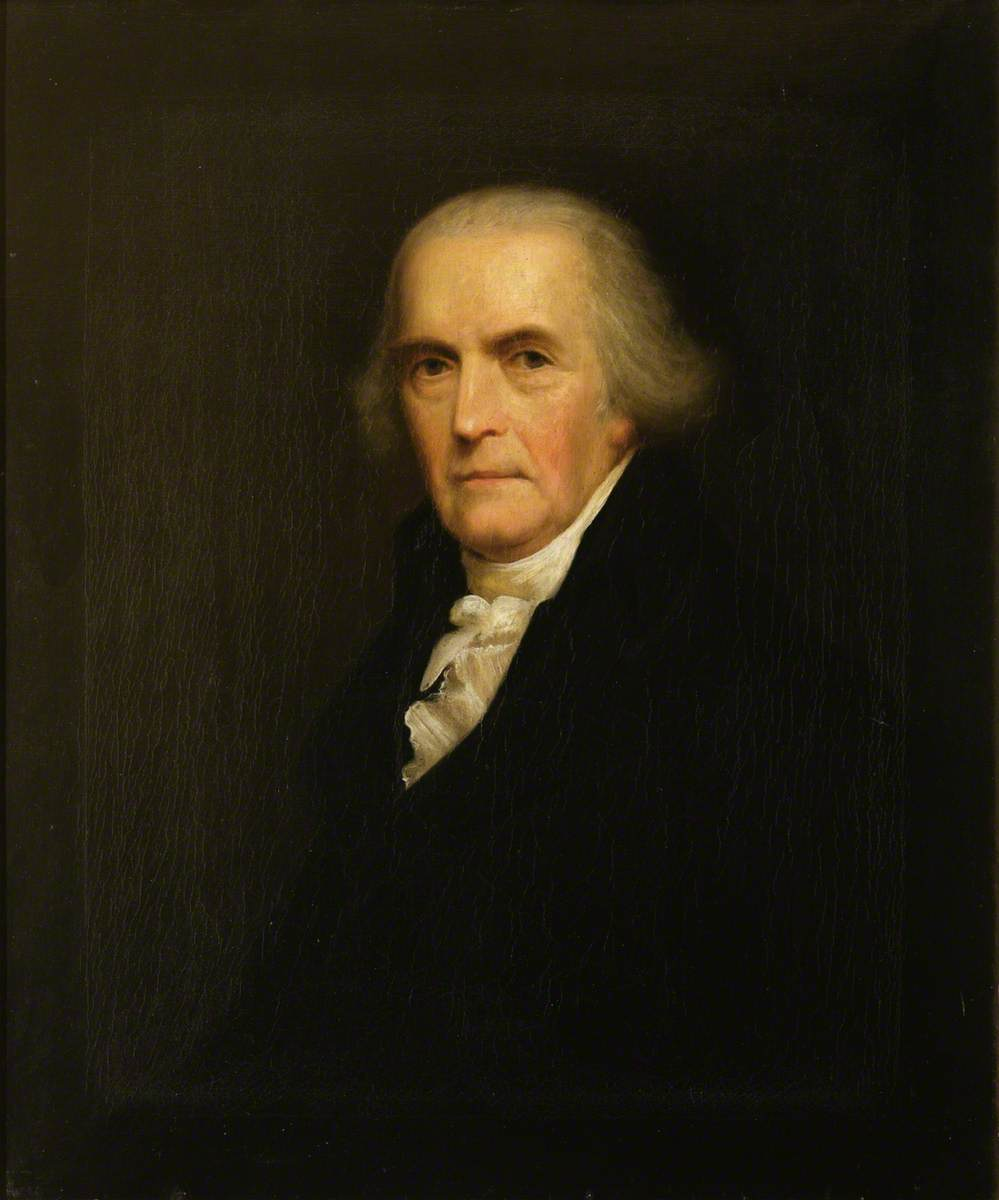
Portrait of James Byres painted in 1810.

He was born in Aberdeenshire in 1733.

Byres was a member of a family of Scottish Jacobite sympathisers. As a young man he joined Ogilvie's Regiment in the French service, but did not pursue a military career for long. In 1758 he settled in Rome, where he studied painting and architecture and became a cicerone and an art dealer, mainly to Scottish and English gentlemen on the Grand Tour until his return to Scotland in 1790. His house was in Via Paolina.

Byres was a painter and an adept designer, whose Vanvitellian design for a palazzo facade won a prize from the Accademia di San Luca in 1762. As an architect, his clients included the Duke of Gordon, Sir Lawrence Dundas and the College of Physicians in Edinburgh. In Rome members of his circle were drawn by Angelica Kauffman in a sketchbook she used from 1762 to 1764: the portraits include the English painter Nathaniel Dance, Gavin Hamilton, and the abbé Peter Grant. By 1764 he was so well acquainted with the ancient sites and the cabinets of collectors that he took about a party of colonial Americans, including Samuel Powel of Philadelphia, who unlike his British peers, took assiduous notes. Other clients in his role as cicerone included Edward Gibbon, Charles Townley, the Dukes of Northumberland and Grafton, the Duke of Hamilton and Lord Clive. Byres, as well as some others British residents in Rome such as Thomas Jenkins and Colin Morison, worked as an art dealer, working with important European collectors. In Rome, Byres lived with his business partner, the engraver Christopher Norton.

William Constable purchased from Byres many of the Italian paintings and marble copies after Roman sculptures at Burton Constable, Yorkshire, and Byres was responsible for introducing the artist Anton Maron, who painted William Constable and his sister in the pose and dress of Cato and Marcia. Among the antiquities that passed through his hands, the most famous may be the Portland Vase, which he sold to Sir William Hamilton in 1770. Among the commissions for which he acted as agent was the Noli me Tangere of Raphael Mengs, 1771, for an altarpiece for All Souls College, 1771.

In 1783 he was one of the founder members of the Royal Society of Edinburgh.

A clear idea of his own collection can be gleaned from a 1790 inventory made upon his return to Tonley. Though he sent many of his clients to Pompeo Batoni, the only Batoni portrait hanging in his house was of his sister Isabella, Mrs Robert Sandilands.

As an archaeologist, Byres' main interest was in the Etruscans. He prepared a volume of text and plates of which only the plates were posthumously published under the title Hypogaei or Sepulchral Caverns of Tarquinia. He formulated the hypothesis that Etruscan literature has not come down to us because it was purposely destroyed by the Romans.

After the French occupation of Rome in 1788 many of the artworks and antiquities Byres owned were sent to the Magazin National de la Republique Francaise in Paris. Before he left the city in 1790 he made a payment to the maître d'hôtel of Henry Benedict Stuart, Cardinal York in favour of the Duchess of Albany, illegitimate daughter of Bonnie Prince Charlie, so it may be inferred that his Jacobite sensibility ran deep. Byres was close friends with Elyza Fraser.

He died at Tonley in Aberdeenshire on 3 September 1817.
