= Good News Study Bible =

The Good News Study Bible is an edition of the Good News Bible with Bible study notes and articles.

== Versions ==
Study Bible versions of the Good News Bible / Today's English Version (GNB/TEV) include:

=== American Bible Society ===
The Good News Study Bible with Deuterocanonicals/Apocrypha (Today's English Version) was published by the American Bible Society. It uses the 1992 second edition of the GNB /TEV (with American spelling), hence the "Today's English" designation. The study notes were translated from the Spanish Version Popular Study Bible notes by Eugene A. Nida and edited by Erroll F. Rhodes, Ph.D. Notes are arranged in a section underneath the Biblical text, in similar style to the NIV Study Bible. Imprimatur is for the Biblical text only, not the notes. 3 Maccabees and Psalm 151 are not included in this Bible.

=== The Bible Societies ===
Published in 1997 by The Bible Societies / HarperCollins, the Good News Study Bible uses the second edition of the GNB/TEV (with British spelling). General Editor The Reverend Professor Paul Ellingworth, 2039 pages. There is a greater emphasis on book and section introductions (including information about the context of the book and how it came to be written and transmitted) so notes for each verse are less comprehensive than those of ISBN 1-58516-120-9 and many other study Bibles. Biblical text is in a single column with the study notes in another column to the right. Section introductions are interspersed throughout the Biblical text, these being differentiated from it by a blue background.

== Comparisons ==
Neither of these editions includes Annie Vallotton's line drawing art. The study notes in both editions attempt to explain the text and give additional information without introducing doctrinal bias.

Although substantial works by major organisations in the field of Bible publishing, these Bibles came out in a market that had been dominated by the NIV Study Bible for some years and did not gain significant market share.
