= George Dance the Younger =

English architect, surveyor and painter (1741–1825)

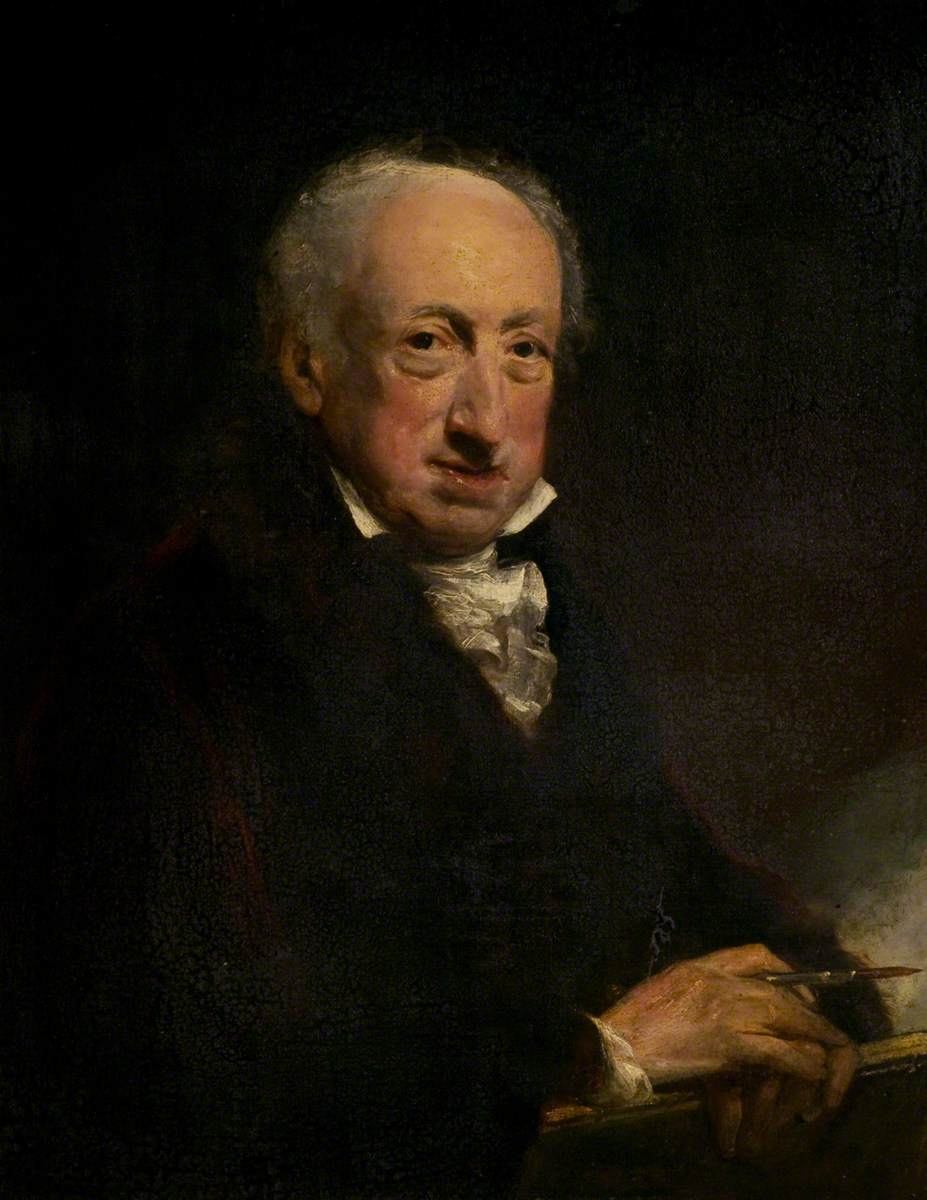
- Portrait by John Jackson
- Born: 1 April 1741; Chiswell Street, London
- Died: 14 January 1825 (aged 83); Bloomsbury, London
- Occupation: Architect
- Awards: Royal Academician
- Practice: City Corporation
- Buildings: Guildhall, London; Mansion House; Newgate Prison; Royal College of Surgeons; etc.
- Projects: Barts Hospital; Commercial Road; Finsbury Circus & HAC HQ; Old Billingsgate Market; etc.

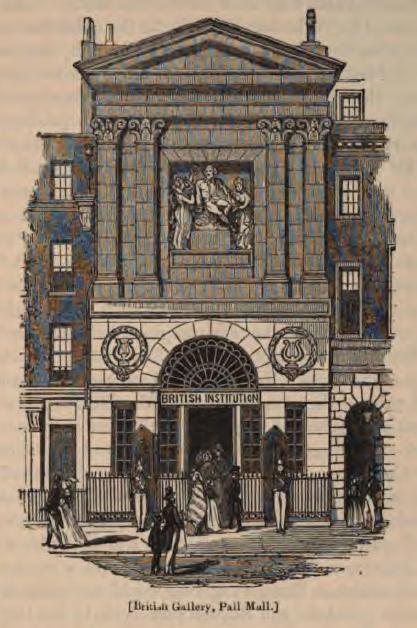
George Dance the younger's Shakespeare Gallery building (1788), shown in 1851 after its purchase by the British Institution (from a wood-engraving in London edited by Charles Knight)

George Dance the Younger RA (1 April 1741 – 14 January 1825) was an English architect, surveyor and painter who specialised in portrait painting. The fifth and youngest son of the architect George Dance the Elder, he came from a family of architects, artists and dramatists. He was described by Sir John Summerson as "among the few really outstanding architects of the century", but few of his buildings remain.

== Life ==
=== Background and education ===
The architect George Dance the elder married Elizabeth Gould in 1719. Their fifth son, George, was born 1 April 1741 at the family home in Chiswell Street, London and was educated at St Paul's School.

Dance spent the six years between 1759 and 1765 studying architecture and draughtsmanship in Rome. Aged 17, he set off on his Grand Tour, sailing from Gravesend, Kent in December 1758. After a short stay in Florence, where he was joined by his brother Nathaniel, who was already studying painting in Italy, he and his brother set off for Rome, arriving in early May 1759. By the early 1760s the brothers were living at 77 Strada Felice. At Rome, Dance was acquainted with the architect James Adam, who was staying nearby at the Casa Guarini, Robert Mylne (they remained lifelong friends), Abbot Peter Grant and Giovanni Battista Piranesi. As a student of the Accademia di San Luca, Dance measured and drew several buildings in Rome, including the three remaining columns of the Temple of Castor and Pollux, the Arch of Constantine and the dome of St. Peter's Basilica, showing much promise as a draughtsman. Much of his later work was inspired by Piranesi. In late 1759 Dance received his first commission – to design two chimneypieces for Sir Robert Mainwaring.

In early 1762 Dance was measuring and drawing the Temple of Vesta, Tivoli and later that year he entered a competition organised by the Academy of Fine Arts of Parma to design A Public Gallery for Statues, Pictures & c.. His drawings were dispatched to Parma in April 1763, and a few weeks later it was announced that he had won the gold medal, and his designs were exhibited at the Ducal Palace. The projected building was in the latest style of neoclassical architecture. During June 1764 the Dance brothers were in Naples, but later that year they were back in Rome, entertaining the actor David Garrick and his wife. On 21 December 1764 George Dance and his brother were elected to the Accademia di San Luca, where he was described as Giorgo Danze, architetto Inglese. On 16 February 1765 Dance dined with the painter Angelica Kauffman and James Boswell, who was visiting Rome. A few weeks later the brothers left Rome to return to London.

=== Career ===
On his return from the Grand Tour, George joined his father's office. His earliest London project was the rebuilding of All Hallows-on-the-Wall Church. He was one of five architects asked to submit designs, and his design was chosen on 8 May 1765. Work on the building starting in June 1765, at a cost of £2,941, and the building was consecrated on 8 September 1767.

In 1768, when he was only 27, George succeeded as Architect and Surveyor to the Corporation of London on his father's death. His first major public works were the rebuilding of Newgate Prison in 1770 and building the front of the Guildhall, London. Other London works of his include the rebuilding of the Church of St Bartholomew the Less (1793), a former chapel within the precincts of St Bartholomew's Hospital.

At Bath, Somerset he largely designed the Theatre Royal, built by John Palmer in 1804–5.

Coleorton Hall was one of his few buildings in the Gothic style.

Many of Dance's buildings have been demolished, including the Royal College of Surgeons (apart from the portico), Newgate Prison, St Luke's Hospital for Lunatics, the Shakespeare Gallery in Pall Mall, the library at Lansdowne House, the Common Council Chamber and Chamberlain's Court at the Guildhall, Ashburnham Place, and Stratton Park (demolished save for its Doric portico). Dance retired from practice in 1815.

Dance's long career spanned several of the conventional phases of the Neo-Classical movement, from mid-18th century French Classicism to the full blown Greek Revival of the early 19th century. As such, he also played an important role in the careers of several major architects within this continuum, such as Sir John Soane and Sir Robert Smirke. His innovative interiors for the church of All Hallows-on-the-Wall, the Guildhall Common Council Chamber, and the sculpture gallery of Lansdowne House, were key to the development of Soane's first work at the Bank of England, the Bank Stock Office in 1792. On Dance's recommendation, Robert Smirke joined Soane's office as a pupil in 1796, but when the two fell out after less than a year, Dance continued to champion Smirke; who went on to become the country's leading Greek Revival architects. Significantly, some of Dance's later work embraced the increasingly austere Greek Revival style, such as the unfluted Doric portico on Stratton Park of 1803, derived from the temples at Paestum, and the unfluted Ionic portico on the Royal College of Surgeons (built 1806 onwards, so representing one of the first Greek Revival porticos in London).

=== The Royal Academy ===
With his brother Nathaniel, George Dance was a founder member of the Royal Academy, founded on 10 December 1768. In 1795, with William Tyler, Dance was appointed to examine the accounts of the Royal Academy following the resignation of Sir William Chambers, and in 1796 they became the Academy's first auditors, helping put the institution on a sounder financial footing.

In 1798 Dance succeeded Thomas Sandby as professor of architecture at the Royal Academy, but as he failed to deliver a single lecture he was dismissed in 1805 and replaced by his former pupil, Sir John Soane. For a number of years he was the last survivor of the 40 original Royal Academicians.

=== A Collection of portraits ===
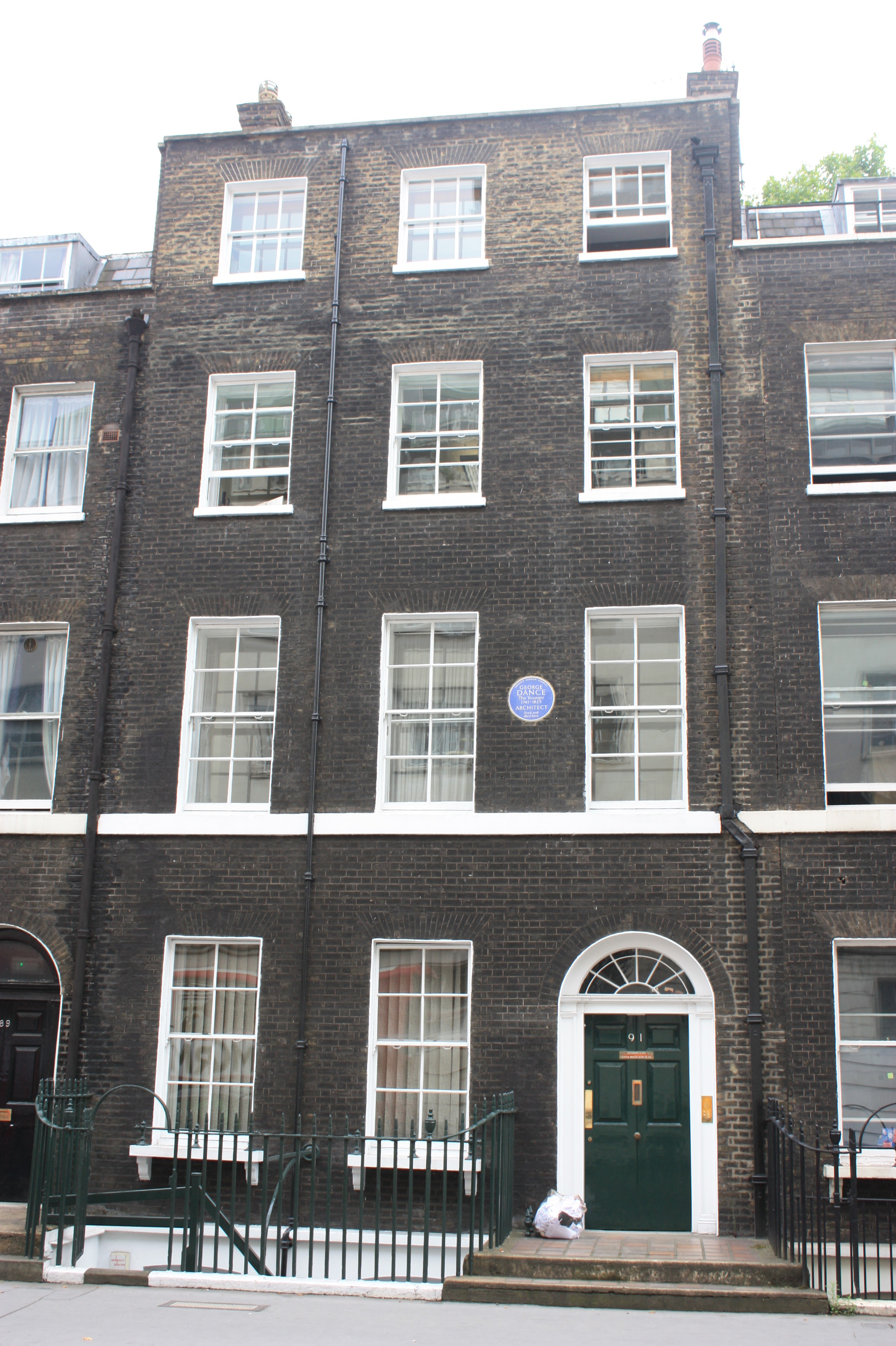
91 Gower Street, London where Dance lived and died

Dance's years after 1798 were devoted to art rather than architecture. His Academy contributions consisted of highly finished pencil profile portraits of his friends in Regency London's artistic establishment. 72 etchings were engraved after them by William Daniell and A Collection of Portraits were published over ten years from 1804. Many are now held by the National Portrait Gallery, London.

=== Personal life ===
Dance married Mary Gurnell (born 7 February 1752 in Pitzhanger Manor) on 24 March 1772 at St. George's, Bloomsbury. Their first child, Thomas, was born in Autumn 1773 and died in 1813. Two more sons followed: George (1778–1813) and Charles Webb (1785–1844). Mary Dance died at the age of 38 in 1791.

Dance suffered from ill health for the last three or four years of his life. He died on 14 January 1825, at No. 91 Gower Street, which is now marked with a blue plaque. He was buried in the crypt at St Paul's Cathedral.

== List of works ==
=== Works in London ===
- All Hallows on the Wall Church (1765)
- Duroure Monument, in Westminster Abbey Cloisters (1766)
- Minories, development of Crescent, Circus, etc (1767 onwards), bombed during The Blitz and demolished
- Newgate Prison & Sessions House (1769–1777) damaged in the Gordon riots (1780) and restored (1780–1783), demolished (1902–04)
- Whitecross Street, Lord Mayor's coach house (1768–71) & almshouses (1770–71), both demolished
- Fleet Market, repairs and new office for Collector (1770–74), demolished
- Stratford Place, Oxford Street, development and alterations to conduits (1771–72)
- Guildhall, London, repairs (1772), rooms over Matted Gallery (1773), Old Council Chamber (1774), New Council Chamber (1777), alterations to Chapel (1774 & 1782), Town Clerk's House (1781), new façade (1785–88), Chamberlain's House (1785–86), New Houses, west side of the Yard (1795), exterior stuccoed (1805), windows of the Great Hall redesigned (1806) & Court of the King's Bench, altered (1804–06), all now demolished save the Guildhall's Façade
- Smithfield Market, new bell & frame (1775), & alterations (1804), rebuilt
- All Hallows Staining, foot passage under porch (1775–76), demolished
- Billingsgate Fish Market, alterations (1776), iron column inserted to support upper floor (1777–78) & New Market house and embankment (1798), rebuilt
- Banner Street and Finsbury Square (1777), none of Dance's buildings are still standing
- New wall and Gates for the Honourable Artillery Company's, Artillery Ground, Bunhill Fields, (c. 1777)
- New houses, Chiswell Street (1777)
- Mr Lowry's House, Lombard Street (1777), demolished
- New House for Keeper of Bunhill Fields (1777), demolished
- Newgate Market, alterations (1777) & (1784–85), demolished
- Obelisk erected on Putney Heath to commemorate invention of Fire insurance marks (1777)
- Lady Dacre's Almshouses, repairs (1778)
- Wesley's Chapel, Finsbury (1778)
- Jewin Street, widened (1779)
- Blackfriars, London, creation of new streets and platform adjoining bridge (1779–92), none of Dance's buildings survive
- Mansion House, London, new entrance, covering of internal courtyard with a roof, new ceiling and lowered the roof of the Egyptian Hall (1782)
- St Luke's Hospital for Lunatics, Old Street (1780), demolished
- Market in Honey Lane rebuilt (1780–88), demolished
- Whitefriars Wharf abutment (1781–82), demolished
- Monument to the Great Fire of London, repairs (1783)
- Fleet Bridge repairs (1783), demolished
- Roger's Almshouses, Hart Street, repairs & alterations (1783)
- Borough Compter, rebuilding (1785), demolished
- Castle Street, Spitalfields widened (1786)
- Beech Street, constructed (1786–88)
- Jewin Crescent, (1786–88), demolished
- Lansdowne House Gallery and other Alterations (1786)
- Giltspur Street Compter (1787–91), demolished
- Boydell Shakespeare Gallery (1788), demolished
- Moorfields, Watch and Engine House (1790), demolished
- Leadenhall Market re-roofed (1790–92) & new warehouses (1813), rebuilt
- Development and improvements of Holborn, (1790 onwards)
- St Bartholomew's Hospital, Surgeon's Theatre and other buildings (1791–96), demolished
- Martin's Bank, Lombard Street, rebuilt (1793), demolished
- St Bartholomew the Less Church, rebuilt (1793)
- Formation of Pickett Street, The Strand improvements (1793 onwards)
- Legal Quays, rebuilt (1793–96)
- St Margaret at Hill Court House Southwark, new façade (1796), demolished
- Tottenham Court Road, estate to the east, North & South Crescents and Alfred Place, (1796 onwards), none of Dance's buildings survive
- Limehouse Canal & warehouses West India Docks (1796 onwards), largely demolished
- London Custom House, repairs (1799), demolished
- St George in the East, alterations to the Rectory (1802)
- Commercial Road, laid out (1803)
- 33 Hill Street, Mayfair (1803), demolished
- Royal College of Surgeons of England, Lincoln's Inn Fields, rebuilt (1806 onwards) later altered by Sir Charles Barry, Dance's portico survives
- 143 Piccadilly for his brother Nathaniel Dance-Holland (his brother changed his name) (1807)
- Whitecross Street Penitentiary (1808–14), demolished
- Lombard Street, widened (1811)
- New Court, St Swithin's Lane, alterations to Nathan Mayer Rothschild's house (1811), demolished
- Finsbury Circus (1815–16), none of Dance's buildings survive.

=== Works outside London ===
- Pitzhanger Manor, Ealing, Dance's own house (1768) later owned by Sir John Soane, who demolished all Dance's work bar the south wing
- Cranbury Park, Hampshire, extensive remodelling, including the new-classical Ballroom (1776–81)
- Monument to Jeremiah Meyer, St. Anne's Church, Kew (1790)
- Coleorton Hall, Leicestershire (1802)
- Laxton Hall, Northamptonshire, alterations to interiors, including Entrance Hall (1806-11)
- Stratton Park, Hampshire, (1803) demolished apart from the Greek Doric portico and replaced by a modern house (1963–65)
- Theatre Royal, Bath, (1804) burnt down (1863) main façade to Beauford Square survives
- St Mary's Church, Micheldever, Hampshire (1806)
- East Stratton, Hampshire, cottage in the village (1806)
- Ashburnham Place, Sussex, alterations (1812)
- Kidbrooke House, Sussex, alterations (1814), demolished
- Camden Place, Chislehurst, remodelling including "the Mixed lounge, the Oval Room, the Office and the beautiful oak panelled Entrance hall with its two secret doors".

=== Gallery of architectural works ===
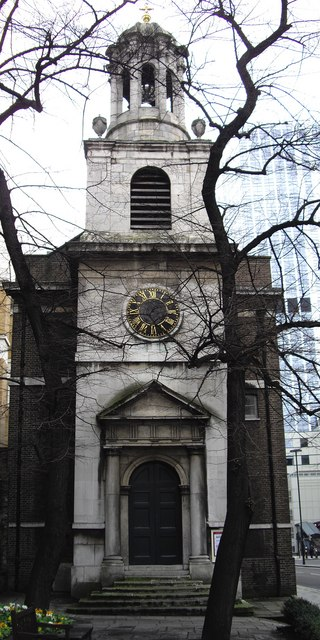
West front of All Hallows Church, London

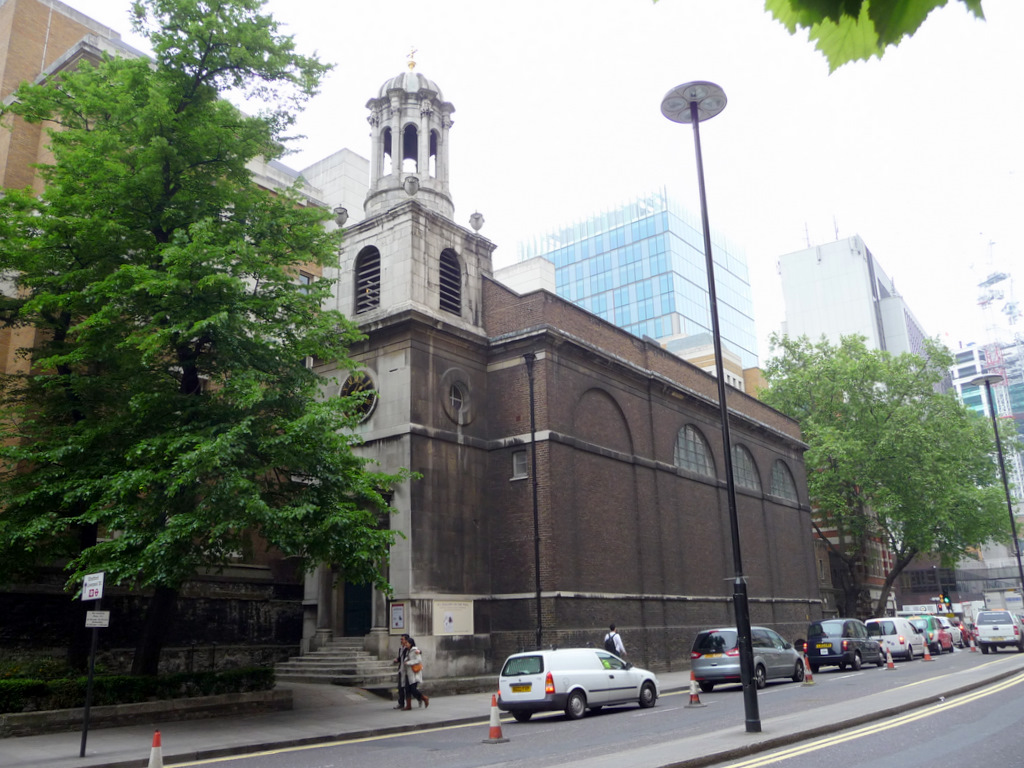
All Hallows-on-the-Wall, London

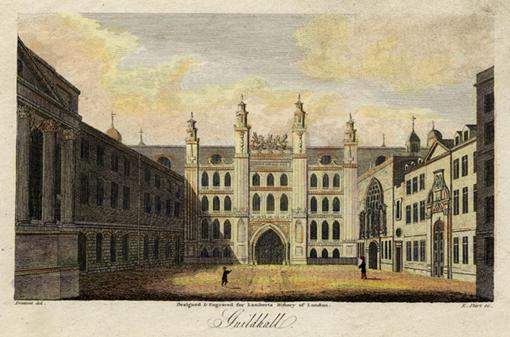
London Guildhall, c. 1805

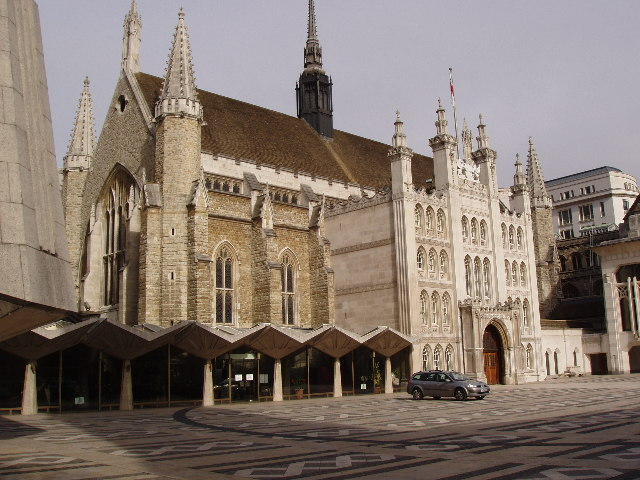
City of London Guildhall, Dance's façade on right

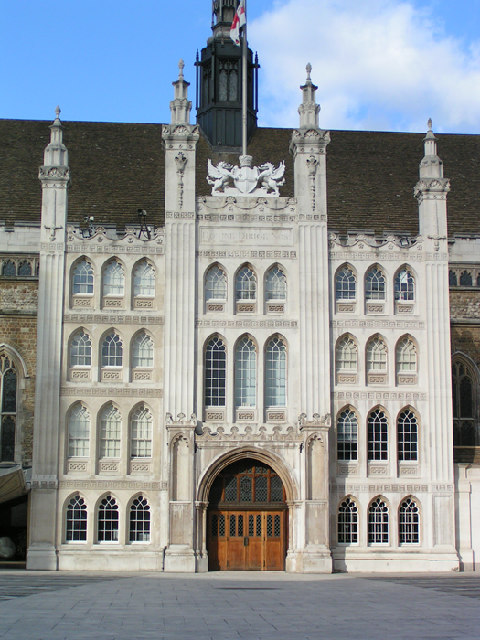
City of London Guildhall, Dance's façade

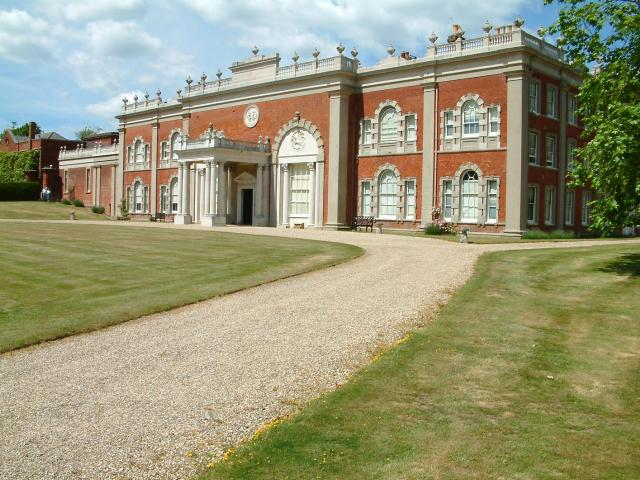
Cranbury House, Hampshire

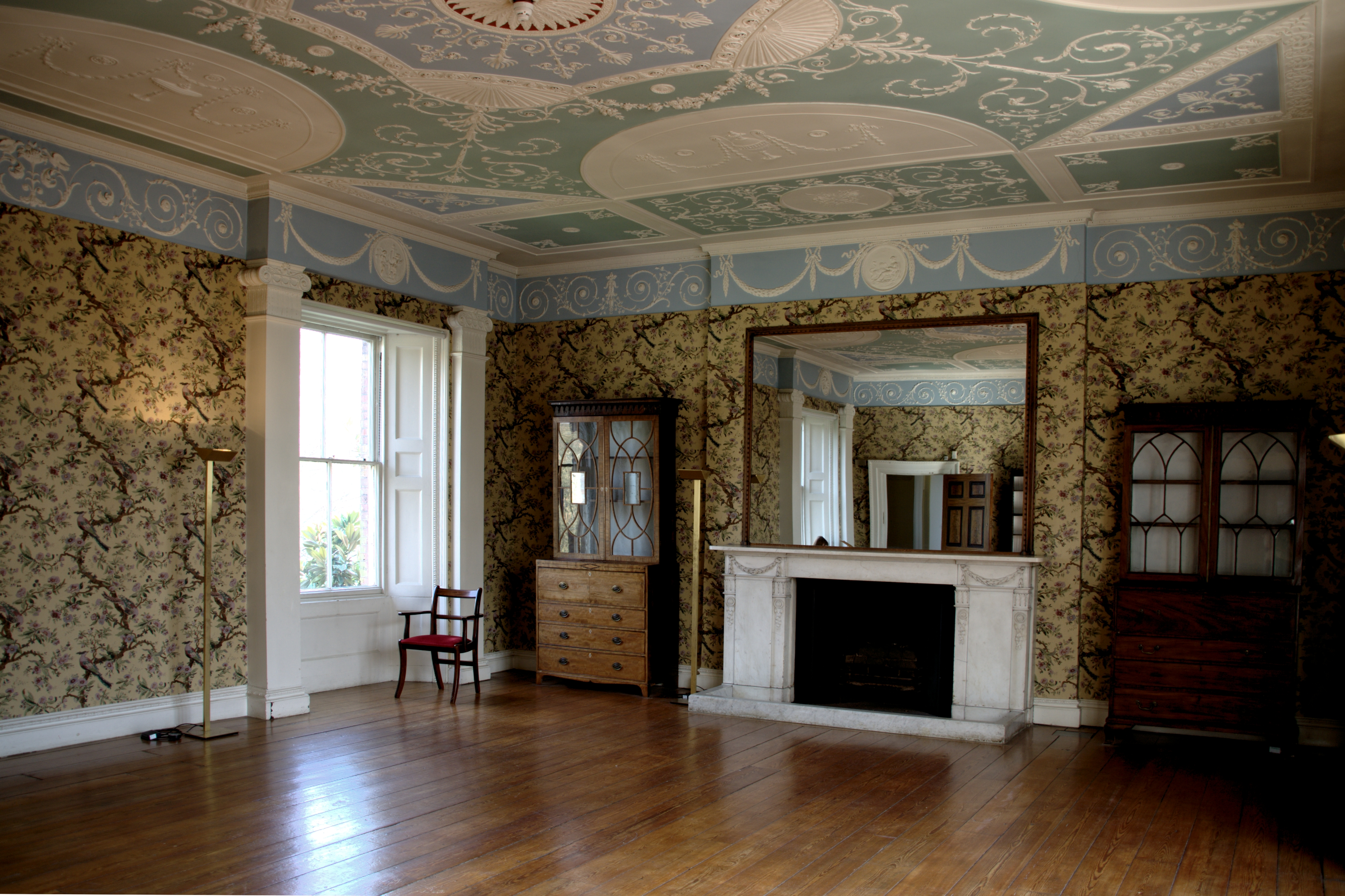
Drawing room at Pitzhanger, Ealing

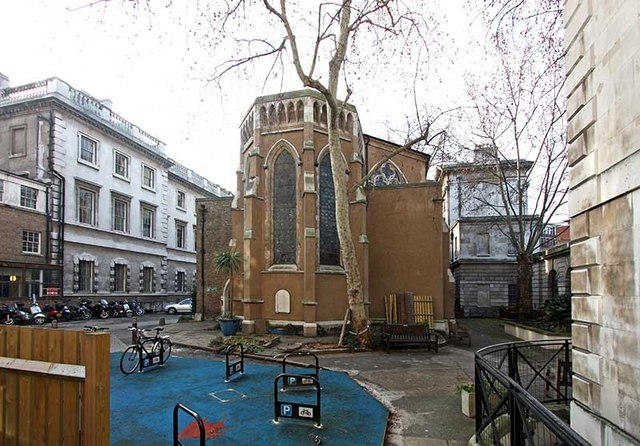
St Bartholomew the Less Church in Barts Hospital, London

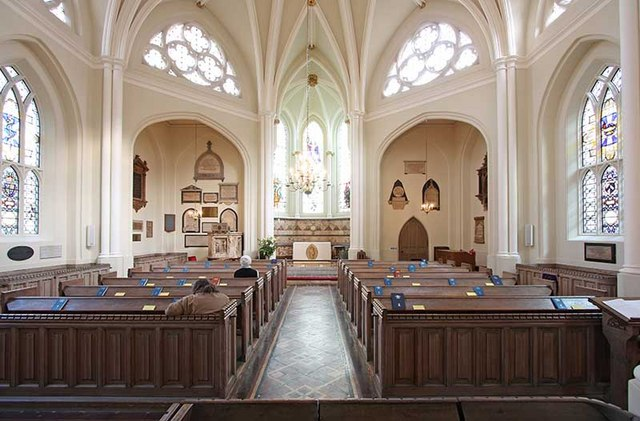
St Bartholomew the Less, West Smithfield, London

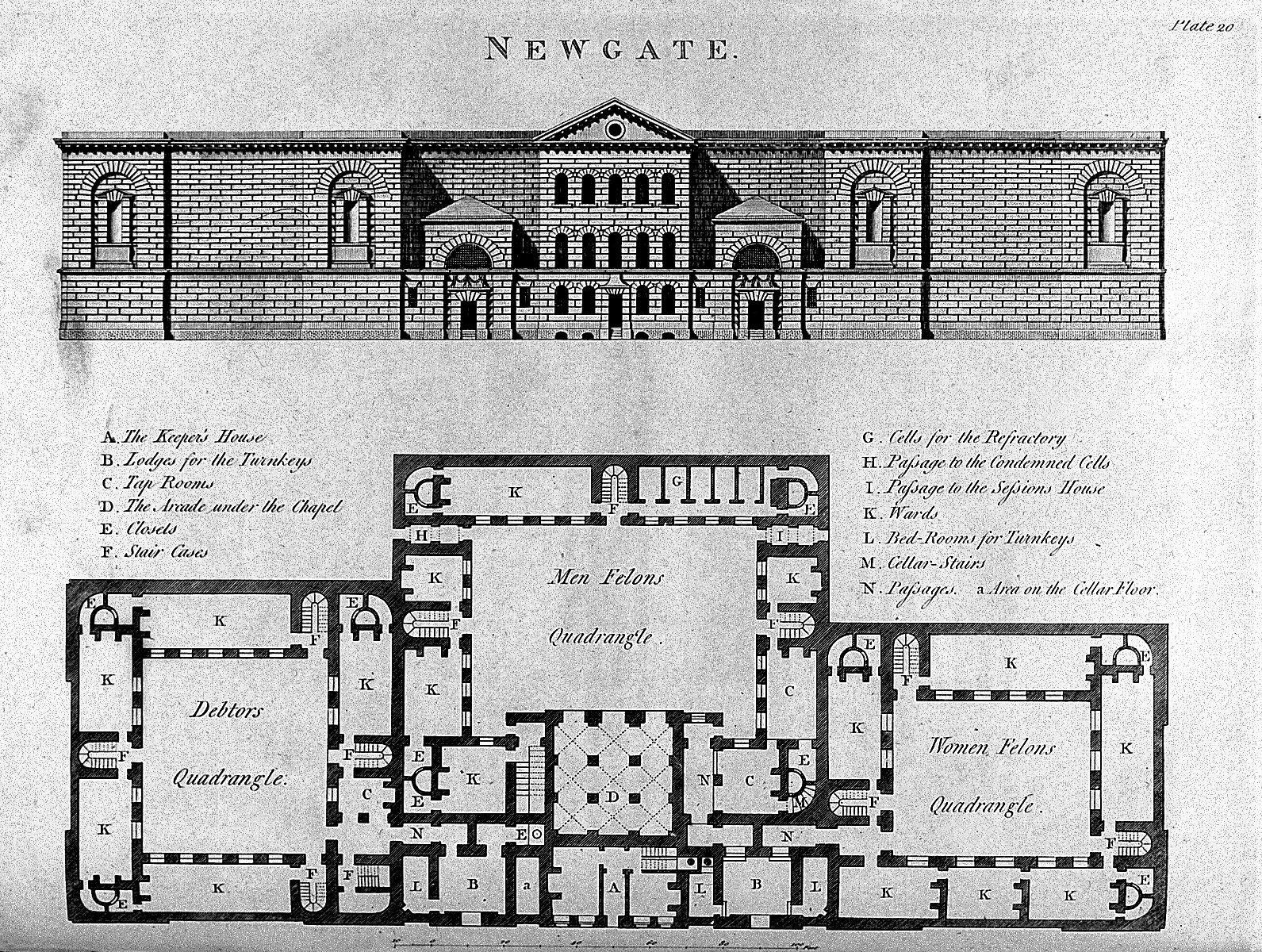
Newgate Gaol, London, demolished

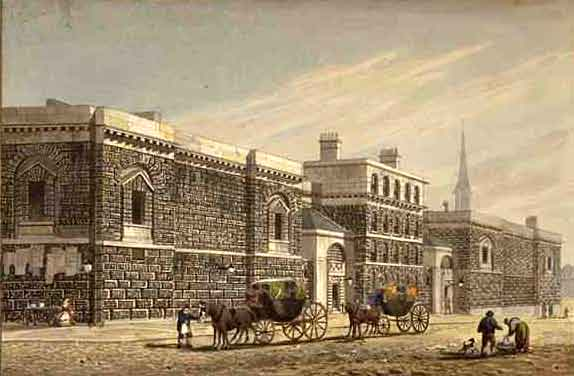
Newgate Gaol, London, demolished

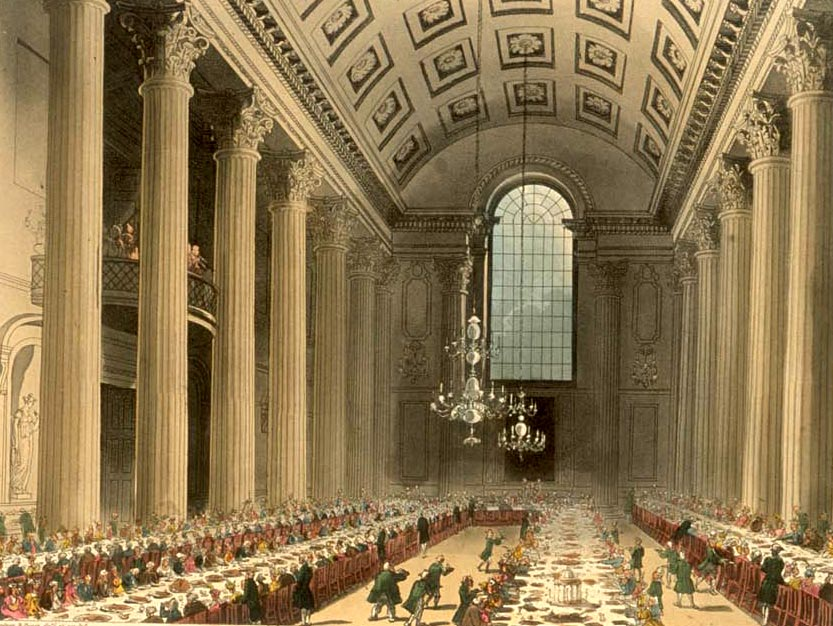
Dance's Egyptian Hall ceiling in the Mansion House, London

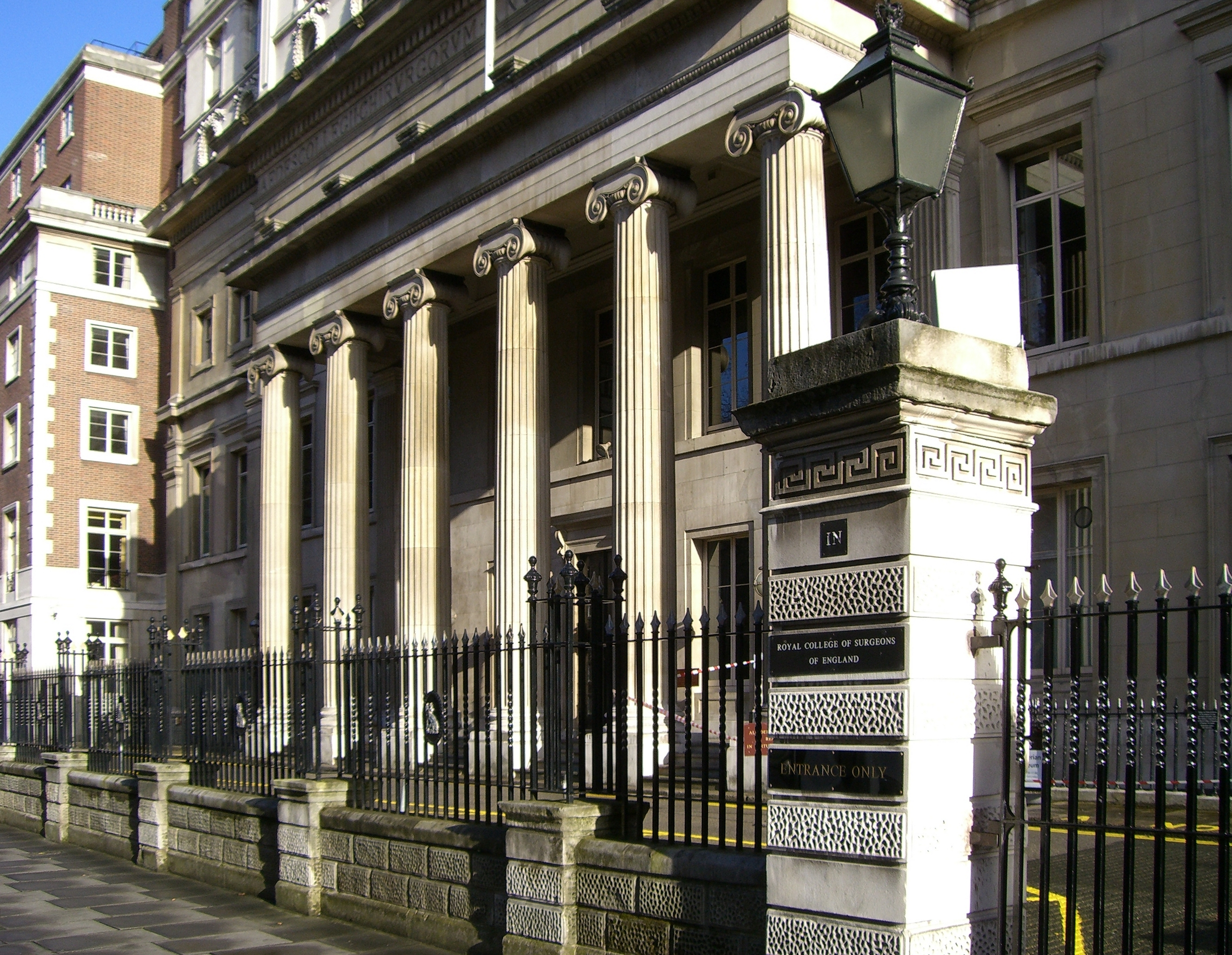
Portico of Royal College of Surgeons at Lincoln's Inn Fields, London

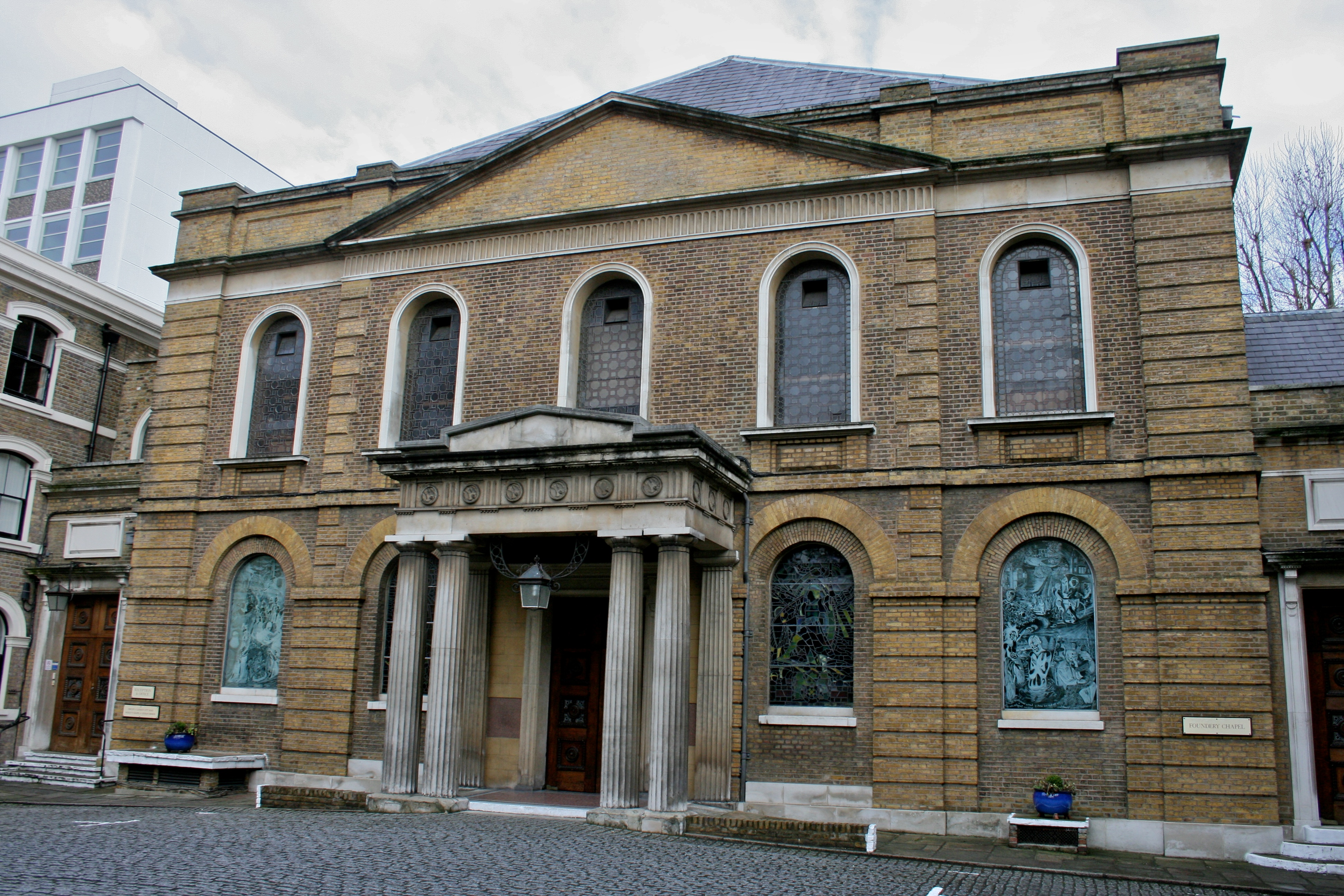
Wesley's Chapel, London

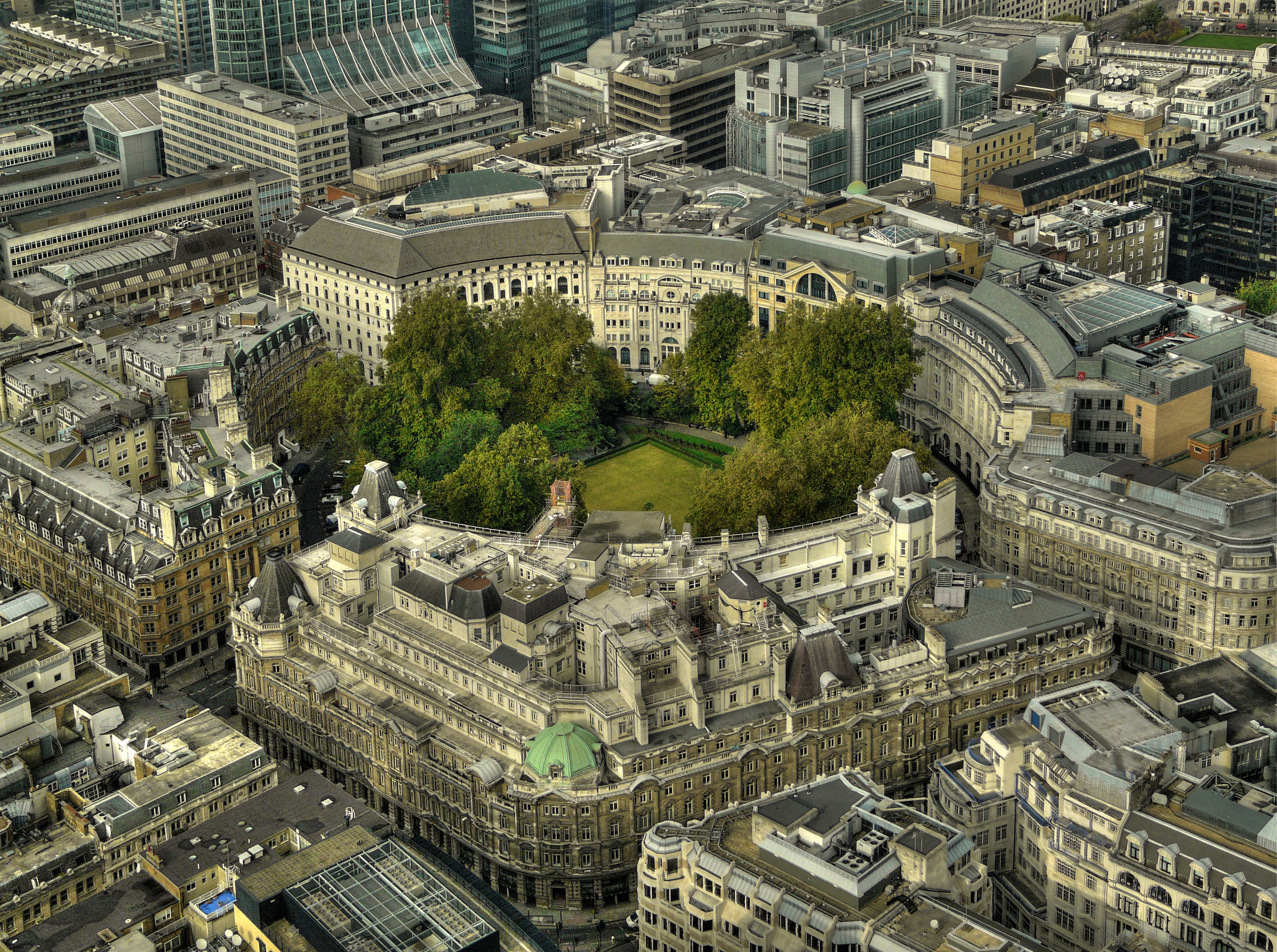
Finsbury Circus layout, all Dance's houses now being replaced by offices

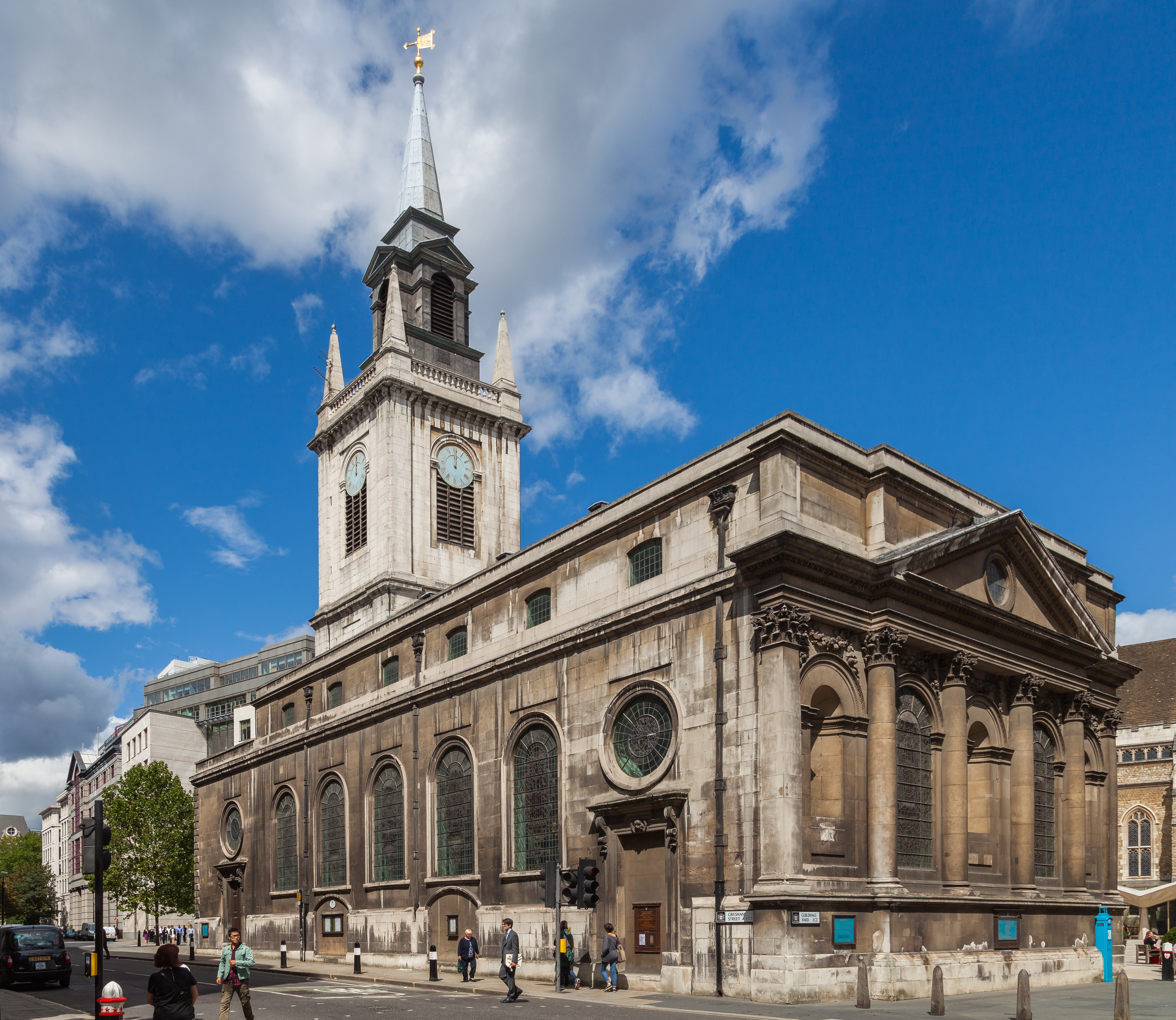
St Lawrence Jewry Church, near Guildhall

== See also ==
- Ammonite Order
