= Festo Kivengere =

Ugandan Anglican leader (1919–1988)

- Bishop of Kigezi
- Church: Church of Uganda
- Diocese: Kigezi
- See: Kigezi

Personal details
- Born: 1918 Rukungiri District, Uganda
- Died: 1988 (aged 69–70) Uganda
- Denomination: Anglican
- Occupation: Bishop, evangelist, author

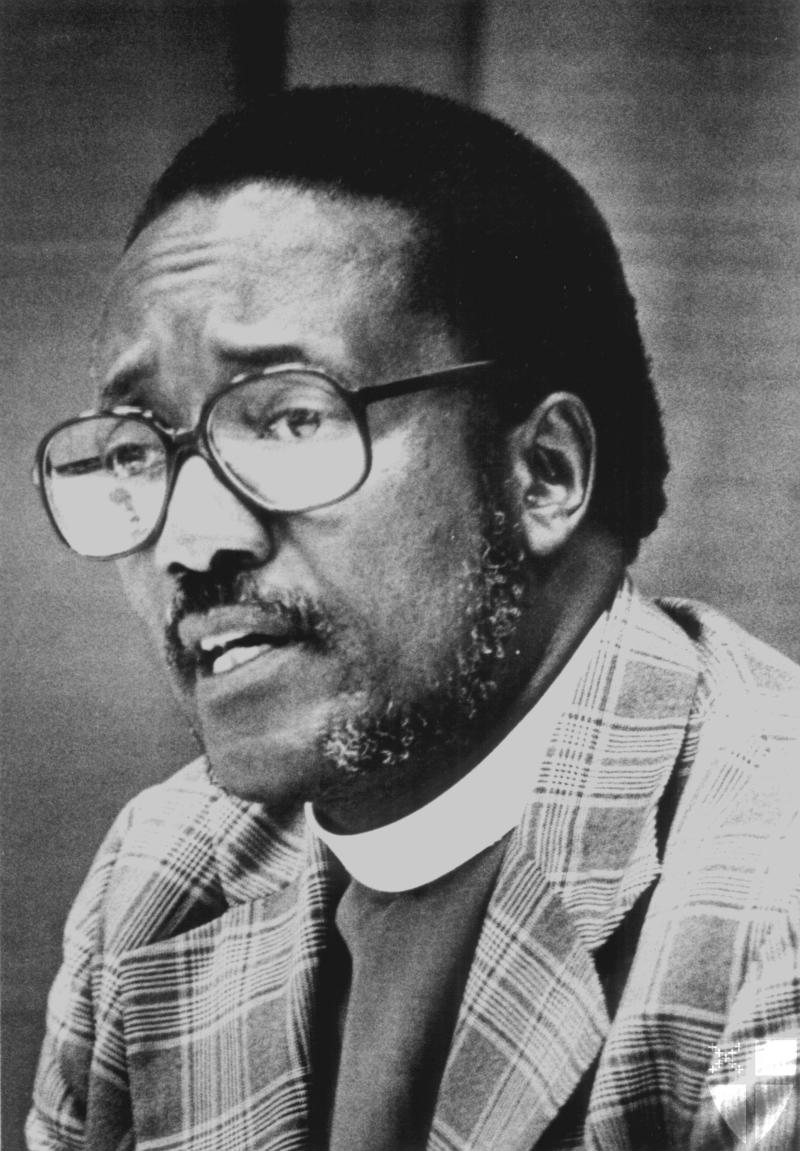
Bishop Festo Kivengere

Festo Kivengere (1918–1988) was a Ugandan Anglican leader sometimes referred to as "the Billy Graham of Africa". He played a huge role in a Christian revival in southwestern Uganda, but had to flee in 1977 to neighboring Rwanda in fear for his life after speaking out against Idi Amin's tyrannical behavior.

== Early life ==
Kivengere was born in Rukungiri and became a Christian while at school; he became a primary school teacher before joining the Church Missionary Society in 1946 and being sent to Tanzania.

== Career in Uganda ==
Kivengere had been made bishop of Kigezi and was among several bishops summoned to Amin's quarters. Angry mobs called for their deaths. Eventually, all were permitted to leave but one, the archbishop, Janani Luwum. The others waited for Luwum to join them but he never came out. The next day the government announced that Luwum had died in an automobile accident. Four days later, despite government threats, 45,000 Ugandans gathered in the Anglican cathedral in Kampala for a memorial service honoring their fallen leader. Kivengere did not attend the service. Urged to flee by friends who said, "One dead bishop is enough," he and his wife that night drove as far as their vehicle could take them and with the help of local church people in the hills they walked until the next morning brought them to safety across the border in Rwanda.

He later authored the book I Love Idi Amin to emphasize the qualities of forgiveness for those who wronged you and love of those who persecute you. Kivengere stated, "On the cross, Jesus said, 'Father, forgive them, because they know not what they do.' As evil as Idi Amin is, how can I do less toward him?" A second article about Kivengere is found in the same online dictionary. Another reporter asked: "If you were standing face to face with Amin, and someone gave you a revolver, what would you do?" "Well," replied Kivengere, "I would hand the revolver back, and say 'This is not my weapon. My weapon is love.'"

Bishop Festo was invited by Michael Cassidy to join African Enterprise in 1969 and to build up a team of AE evangelists in East Africa.

In 1975, Kivengere shared the Bible Expositor post at Eurofest '75 with Luis Palau. Eurofest '75 was co-sponsored by the Billy Graham organisation and was held in Brussels, Belgium at the Palais du Centenaire and the Heysel Stadium from 24 July til 2 August.

He returned to Uganda after Amin's downfall to continue an active ministry until his death by leukemia in 1988.

Kivengere was known as a great storyteller and often thrilled his own and other's children with his storytelling skills. A favorite story of his: "One day a little girl sat watching her mother working in the kitchen. She asked her mummy, 'What does God do all day long?' For a while the mother was stumped, but then she said, 'Darling, I'll tell you what God does all day long. He spends his whole day mending broken things.'"

== Publications ==
Kivengere wrote several books including;

- When God Moves in Revival (1973) ISBN 0842379908
- I Love Idi Amin: The Story of Triumph Under Fire In The Midst Of Suffering And Persecution In Uganda (1977) ISBN 0551055774
- Revolutionary Love (1983) ISBN 1882840038
- The Spirit is Moving ISBN 9781882840274
- Love Unlimited ISBN 0830703748

== Family ==
Kivengere was married to Merab and they had four daughters named Peace, Joy, Hope and Charity.

== See also ==
- John Edward Church
- Zac Niringiye

== Bibliography ==
- Coomes, Anne (1990). Festo Kivengere Eastbourne: Monarch. ISBN 1854240218. Authorised biography.
