= Choralerna =

- Genres: Christian

Choralerna, was a gospel-choir from Gothenburg, Sweden active from 1968 to 1981. They were conducted by Jan-Olof "Jum-Jum" Johansson 1968-1969 and then by Lars Brandström^{sv} 1969-1981. Choralerna was one of Sweden's first and most well known gospel-choirs.

They increased their international following by playing at Spree '73 and performing Living Water at Eurofest '75 as one of the main attractions.

== Discography ==
- 1969 Gospel Soul (EP) (Signatur^{sv})
- 1969 Over My head (Signatur)
- 1970 Get back, Satan (single) (Signatur)
- 1971 Step Out (Signatur)
- 1972 Choralerna Live (Signatur)
- 1973 Power (Signatur)
- 1974 Let's Celebrate (Key Records)
- 1975 Living Water (Choralerna production)
- 1976 Let There Be Light (Myrrh UK)
- 1976 Varde ljus (Signatur)
- 1978 Danniebelle Live in Sweden (Sparrow) (with Danniebelle Hall)
- 1979 Vingar som bär (Signatur)
