= Illuminated World =

Swedish publishing group

The cover of Bible Illuminated: The Book: New Testament

Illuminated World (formerly Förlaget Illuminated Sweden, AB), Lidingö, is a Swedish publishing group best known for releasing Bible Illuminated: The Book. Composed of business executives and headed by Dag Söderberg and Jan Carlzon, the group was formed to foster the Book’s production. Illuminated World has partnerships with both the American Bible Society and Midpoint Trade Books.

== Bible Illuminated: THE BOOK - Nya testamentet ==
In 2007, Illuminated World published Bible Illuminated: The Book, a two-volume glossy release that combines a Swedish translation of the Bible with contemporary photographs in the format of a 300-page glossy magazine, Instead of the Swedish word "Boken", "The Book", English was chosen to sound more challenging and modern. The two volumes were subtitled "Gamla testamentet" and "Nya testamentet".

The publication was developed following a discussion of the Bible’s readership and accessibility; according to Söderberg, the group decided to reproduce both Testaments "in a magazine style with interesting images and running text instead of chapters, verses... a format most people are familiar with when reading news stories." The first run of Bible Illuminated: The Book increased bible sales in the mostly secular Sweden by nearly 50 percent.

=== Bible Illuminated: The Book (English edition) ===
The text of the Good News Translation replaces the original Swedish in the English-language version, which was published October 2008. Bible Illuminated: The Book and its author Dag Söderberg were featured on the June 4, 2009 episode of The Colbert Report.
