= Luis Palau =

Argentine-American evangelist (1934–2021)

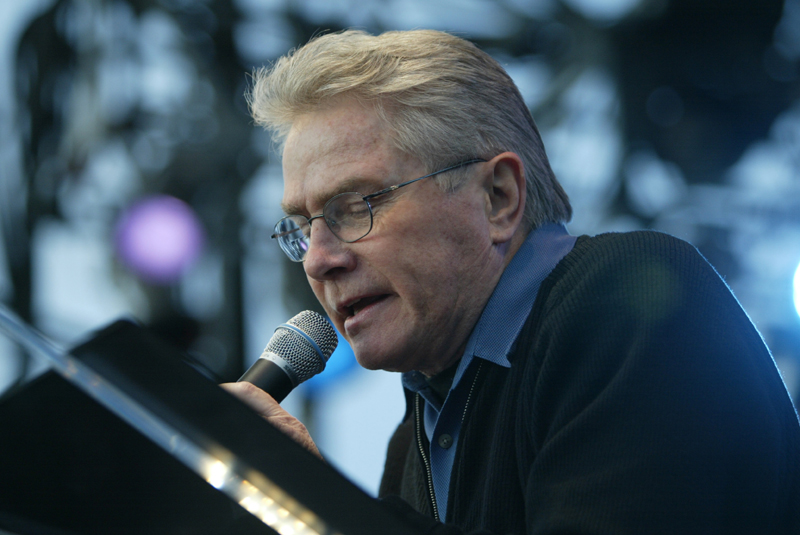
- Palau speaking at an event in 2004
- Born: November 27, 1934; Ingeniero Maschwitz, Buenos Aires, Argentina
- Died: March 11, 2021 (aged 86); Portland, Oregon, U.S.
- Education: Multnomah Bible College
- Occupation: Evangelist
- Years active: 1960–2021
- Notable work: A Friendly Dialogue between an Atheist and a Christian; Calling America and the Nations to Christ
- Political party: Palau made a point of staying out of politics, refusing to endorse ballot measures or candidates.
- Spouse: Patricia Palau (m. 1961)
- Children: 4
- Website: palau.org

Luis Palau Jr. (November 27, 1934 – March 11, 2021) was an Argentine-American international Christian evangelist. He was born in Argentina but moved to Portland, Oregon, in his mid-twenties to enroll in a graduate program in Biblical studies.

Palau had a long and close relationship with evangelist Billy Graham, and was characterized by many as Graham's successor. "One of the world’s leading evangelical Christian figures," he was known for his strong appeal to young people, and for his efforts to reach out to secular leaders to address issues like homelessness.

In 2007, Palau was estimated to have shared the message of Jesus Christ with 25 million people in 70 nations. Palau's ministry employs 70 people in their headquarters in Beaverton, Oregon, and another 25 around the world which include offices in Buenos Aires, Argentina and London.

In 2018, Palau shared on Facebook and YouTube that he had stage-four lung cancer; he died in March 2021.

== Early life ==
Luis Palau Jr. was born November 27, 1934, in Maschwitz, Buenos Aires, Argentina. He has five younger sisters and one brother. His father, a construction executive, died when Palau was 10. Within a matter of years after his father's death, because of poor financial management by relatives, Palau, his siblings, and his widowed mother were left nearly destitute. Palau was forced to leave his education at a British-run boarding school and began working as the sole provider for the family at a bank in Córdoba, Argentina.

Palau says that he was born again at the age of 12, devoting his life to Christ. He first heard Billy Graham on a radio broadcast from Portland, Oregon, while still living in Argentina in 1950, and drew inspiration from him. He later worked for Graham as a Spanish translator and as an evangelist. In 1970, Graham contributed the seed money for Palau to start his own ministry, which he modeled after Graham's.

Since then, Palau held many large-scale evangelistic festivals and gatherings around the world.

== Settling in the US ==
Palau arrived in Portland in 1960 to attend a graduate program at Multnomah Bible College, from which he graduated in 1961. His travel and tuition was paid by U.S. benefactors. There he met his wife, Pat, a Beaverton kindergarten teacher, who was a fellow student. They married in 1961 and settled in Cedar Mill, an unincorporated area of the Portland metropolitan area just north of Beaverton. They would go on to have four children: Kevin, Keith, Andrew, and Stephen Palau. He became a U.S. citizen in 1962. The Palaus spent the next eight years serving as missionaries in Mexico and Colombia, before returning to Oregon. After receiving $100,000 as seed money in 1970 from Billy Graham, in quarterly payments of $25,000, Palau worked to build up his ministry in Oregon through the 1970s.

In 1975, Palau shared the Bible Expositor post at Eurofest '75 with Bishop Festo Kivengere. Eurofest '75 was co-sponsored by the Billy Graham organisation and was held in Brussels, Belgium, at the Palais du Centenaire and the Heysel Stadium from July 24 until August 2, 1975. In October 1978, the Luis Palau Evangelistic Association, based in Beaverton, was incorporated.

== Growing local popularity and secular service ==
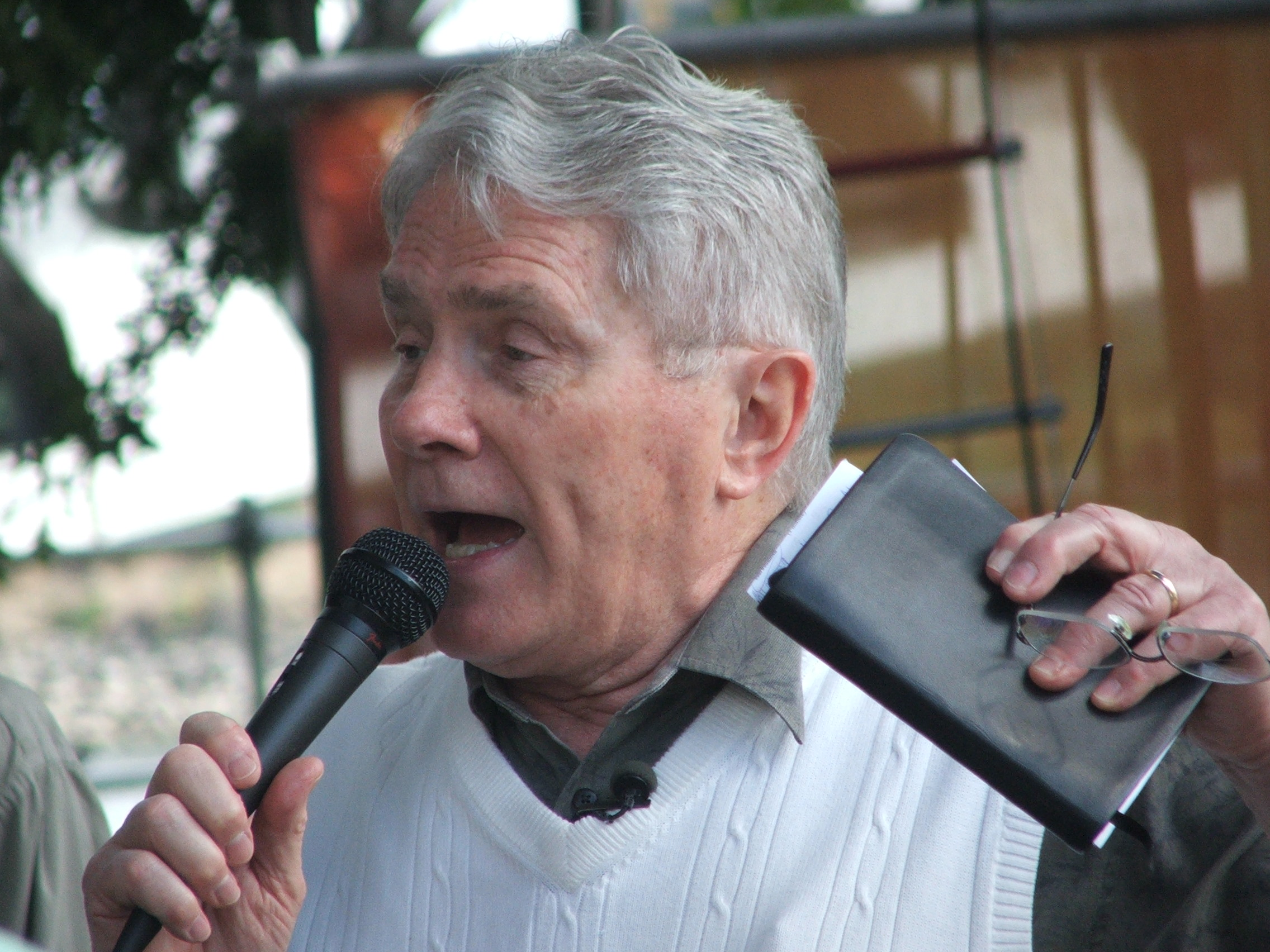
Palau in 2008

In 1999, a writeup in a Portland weekly newspaper noted that Palau had assembled an 80,000-member audience in "the nation's least-churched major city." It also noted the contrast with the previous large revival, led by an aging Graham, which drew larger numbers but not as many young people as Palau's. Media coverage of Palau's event mentioned Palau as a potential successor to Graham. The annual budget of his ministry was estimated that year at $6 million.

His ministry, the Luis Palau Evangelical Association, continued to be based in nearby Beaverton as of 2003. Three of his four sons were working for his ministry at that time.

As of 2003, Palau hosted three daily radio programs: an English show carried by 900 stations in 23 countries, and two Spanish programs carried by 880 stations in 25 countries. In that year he was noted for being "at the forefront of efforts to make evangelism more active, contemporary and accessible to a younger audience," and his ministry's annual budget was estimated at $11 million.

In August 2003, Palau mobilized several thousand volunteers from numerous churches to "spruce up" local public schools.

In November 2005, Palau visited China, wrapping up a week-long visit by attending a Beijing church service along with U.S. President George W. Bush. He launched a book venture after holding a conversation with a former government Chinese official during his trip to Beijing; Palau launched a book venture based on the transcribed work. The book, now published by Zondervan, is entitled A Friendly Dialogue Between An Atheist and a Christian.

Palau made a point of staying out of politics, refusing to endorse ballot measures or candidates. Recently he has partnered with secular leaders as well. Portland Mayor Vera Katz did not attend his first big Portland event in 1999, but her successor, Tom Potter, who is not a churchgoer, approached Palau at a 2005 Portland appearance by First Lady Laura Bush. Potter asked for Palau's assistance in getting other evangelical leaders to address Portland's homelessness problems.

Palau got in touch with fellow evangelicals, and cooperated with Portland Commissioner Erik Sten, Potter, Beaverton Mayor Rob Drake, and Gresham Mayor Shane Bemis in 2008 in planning his August 22–23 festival, which focused on volunteerism in support of the homeless. Palau's last Portland event drew about 140,000 people over two days. Palau addressed 500 Christian pastors in March 2008, joined by Portland City Commissioner Sam Adams, in the buildup to the August event. He calls the effort the "Season of Service".

In 2013, Palau was residing in Cedar Mill, but in late 2018 was residing in nearby Bethany, another unincorporated area also north of Beaverton and immediately west of Cedar Mill. A November 2018 article in the Beaverton Valley Times referred to the Cedar Mill Bible Church as Palau's "home base".

In 2015, Palau hosted CityFest, an evangelistic event in New York City that drew 60,000 people to Central Park. This was a year-long effort that involved over 1,700 churches.

== Illness and death ==
On January 17, 2018, Palau shared on Facebook and YouTube that he had stage-four lung cancer. In late November 2018, he told a reporter for the Beaverton Valley Times that his cancer had "stabilized for now". His health worsened in early 2021, however, leading to hospitalization in February and a subsequent decision to discontinue treatment.

On March 11, 2021, Palau died of lung cancer, in his home, surrounded by family. He was 86.

== Works ==
Palau wrote numerous books including:

- Where Is God When Bad Things Happen? ISBN 978-0385492645
- Calling America and the Nations to Christ ISBN 978-0785279846
- God is Relevant ISBN 978-0385486798
- High Definition Life ISBN 978-0800718657
- A Friendly Dialogue between an Atheist and a Christian ISBN 978-0-310-28533-5

== Movie ==
A film entitled Palau the Movie was released in 2019. It tells the story of Palau's life and ministry. Starring Gastón Pauls and Alexia Moyano, the film is in color and is 117 minutes long.
