= Wallspace (gallery) =

British art gallery

Coordinates: 51°30′59.77″N 0°5′3.60″W

Wallspace was an art gallery housed in the Church of England church, All Hallows-on-the-Wall in the City of London. Founded in 2006 by Meryl Doney and aimed at providing a 'spiritual home for visual arts.', the space inspired Damien Hirst to produce several paintings for the gallery. The gallery was associated with the Young British Artists and exhibited work from Damien Hirst and Sam Taylor-Wood.
