= Good News Bible =

English translation of the Bible

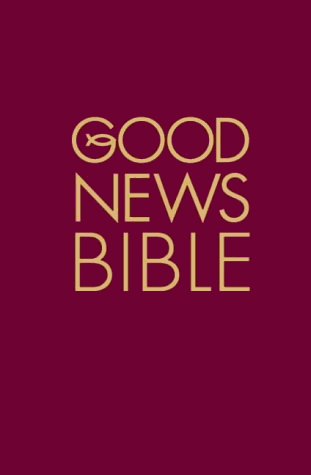
- The international cover of the Good News Bible, used since 2004
- Full name: Good News Bible
- Other names: Good News Translation, Today's English Version
- Abbreviation: GNB (or GNT/TEV)
- OT published: 1976
- NT published: 1966
- Complete Bible published: 1976
- Textual basis: Medium Correspondence to Nestle-Aland Novum Testamentum Graece 27th edition
- Translation type: Dynamic equivalence
- Publisher: Bible Societies, HarperCollins
- Copyright: American Bible Society 1966, 1967, 1970, 1971, 1976, 1979 (Deuterocanonicals/Apocrypha), 1992; Anglicizations British and Foreign Bible Society 1994
- Genesis 1:1–3 In the beginning, when God created the universe, the earth was formless and desolate. The raging ocean that covered everything was engulfed in total darkness, and the Spirit of God was moving over the water. Then God commanded, "Let there be light" — and light appeared. John 3:16 For God loved the world so much that he gave his only Son, so that everyone who believes in him may not die but have eternal life.

Good News Bible (GNB), formerly named Today’s English Version, and also called the Good News Translation (GNT) in the United States, is an English translation of the Bible by the American Bible Society. It was anglicised by the British and Foreign Bible Society with the use of metric measurements for the Commonwealth market. It is a multi-denominational translation, with editions used by many Christian denominations. It is published by HarperCollins, a subsidiary of News Corp.

== Beginnings ==
The beginnings of the Good News Bible can be traced to requests made by people in Africa and the Far East for a version of the Bible that was easier to read. In 1961, a home missions board also made a request for the same type of translation. Besides these requests, the GNB was born out of the translation theories of linguist Eugene Nida, the Executive Secretary of the American Bible Society's Translations Department. In the 1960s, Nida envisioned a new style of translation called dynamic equivalence. That is, the meaning of the Hebrew and Greek would be expressed in a translation "thought for thought" rather than "word for word". The dynamic theory was inspired by a Spanish translation for Latin American native peoples.

The American Bible Society, impressed with Nida's theories, decided to use them. Due to these requests and Nida's theories, Robert Bratcher (who was at that time an employee at the American Bible Society), did a sample translation of the Gospel of Mark. This later led to a translation of the full New Testament. The result, titled Good News for Modern Man: The New Testament in Today's English Version, was released in 1966 as a 599-page paperback with a publication date of January 1, 1966. It received a mass marketing effort with copies even being made available through grocery store chains. The New Testament would see second, third, and fourth editions released in 1967, 1971, and 1976, respectively..

The Psalms were published in 1970 as The Psalms For Modern Man in Today's English Version. Other portions of the Old Testament began to appear over the course of the 1970s—Job in 1971, Proverbs and Ecclesiastes in 1972, Jonah in 1973, Ruth, Hosea, Amos, and Micah in 1974, and Exodus in 1975.

In 1976, the Old Testament was completed and published as the Good News Bible: The Bible in Today's English Version. In 1979, the Deuterocanonical books were added to the Good News Bible and published as Good News Bible: Today's English Version with Deuterocanonicals/Apocrypha and also later published as part of subsequent Catholic Editions. In 1992, the translation was revised with inclusive language.

It was formerly known as Today's English Version (TEV), but in 2001 was renamed the Good News Translation in the U.S., because the American Bible Society wished to improve the GNB's image as a translation where it had a public perception as a paraphrase. Despite the official terminology, it is still often referred to as the Good News Bible in the United States.

The Bible Societies released the Contemporary English Version in 1995, also using jargon-free English. While this translation is sometimes perceived as a replacement for the GNB, it was not intended as such, and both translations continue to be used. While the American Bible Society promotes both translations, the British and Foreign Bible Society and HarperCollins have since 2007 refocused their publishing efforts on the GNB including the Good News Bible iPhone App.

== Popularity ==
The GNB has been a popular translation used across multiple denominations of Christianity. By 1969, Good News for Modern Man had sold 17.5 million copies. By 1971, that number had swelled to 30 million copies.

It has been endorsed by Billy Graham and several Christian denominations, including the Catholic Church in the United States (Today's English Version, Second Edition), the Southern Baptist Convention, and the Presbyterian Church (USA). Excerpts from the New Testament were used extensively in evangelistic campaigns, such as the Billy Graham crusades and others, from the late 1960s right through to the early 1980s. In 1991, a Gallup poll of British parishioners showed that the GNB was the most popular Bible version in that nation.

In 2003, the GNB was used as the basis for a film version of the Gospel of John. In 2008, Swedish group Illuminated World paired the text of the GNB with contemporary photography for the English translation of Bible Illuminated: The Book.

A catholic edition with the imprimatur of the Catholic Church Episcopal conference was also published by the British & Foreign Bible Society in 2017. This version of the Good News Bible (GNB) incorporates the catholic Bible books canon and features the iconic line illustrations by Annie Vallotton.

The publisher HarperCollins has identified Vallotton as the best-selling artist of all time, thanks largely to the success of the Good News Bible, of which more than 225 million copies have been distributed.

== Features ==
The GNB is written in a simple, everyday language, with the intention that everyone can appreciate it, and so is often considered particularly suitable for children and for those learning English. There are introductions to each book of the Bible. Unlike most other translations, some editions of the GNB contain line drawings of biblical events with a snippet of text. The line drawings were done by Annie Vallotton (1915–2013).

Since the focus is strongly on ease of understanding, poetry is sometimes sacrificed for clarity. This choice can be seen in the example quotation of John 3:16, which is rendered, "For God loved the world so much that ...", which is more conversational than the familiar "For God so loved the world". The phrase contains a figurative, if not literal, translation: the Greek word for "so" in that passage is οὕτως, which likely means "in such a way" as well as "so much". Because the implication of the phrase "in such a way that he would sacrifice his only son" includes the implication of "so much" and could certainly not include the opposite "loved the world so little," the translators chose the phrase "so much" for its brevity and clarity.

== See also ==
- The Gospel of John - a movie based word-for-word on the Good News Bible.
- Bible translations into English
- List of English Bible translations
  - New Living Translation
  - Good News Study Bible
