= Spree '73 =

1973 Christian festival in London, England

Spree '73 (a portmanteau of "spiritual re-emphasis", also spelt Spre-e), was a major Christian festival held in Earls Court and Wembley Arena, London during August 1973. At its peak at Wembley it was estimated that there was an attendance of over 30,000.

It was organised by the Billy Graham Evangelistic Association and was addressed by Billy Graham himself. It was inspired by America's Christian youth event Explo '72.

Featured throughout was the Swedish Gospel choir Choralerna from Gothenburg and music by Kevin Gould.

The final event in Wembley on August 4 featured Cliff Richard, Johnny Cash, Kevin Gould, June Carter, Carl Perkins and Betty Lou Mills with Dave Price on Guitar and Pat Morgan on bass. An album of the event was released in August 1974 called "Live at Spre·e" with liner notes written by Dave Foster.

Its success led to the Billy Graham association organising Eurofest '75 in Brussels.
