= Alfred Kuen =

- Born: Alfred Frédéric Kuen; 31 August 1921; Strasbourg
- Died: 6 April 2018 (aged 96); Strasbourg

Alfred Frédéric Kuen (August 31, 1921 – April 6, 2018) was a French evangelical theologian, Biblical translator, writer and teacher.

== Biography ==
Kuen was born on August 31, 1921, in Strasbourg, and he died on Friday April 6, 2018, at the age of 96. Kuen was the son of Albert Kuen and Lina, née Kaetzel. In 1937, Kuen entered the École Normale des Instituteurs in Strasbourg. In 1938 Kuen became ill with preuresis, which complicated into tuberculosis. That same year his mother died. In 1939 Kuen began work on a synopsis of various versions of the Bible.

Between 1939 and 1945, during the Second World War in Alsace, he was drafted several times, sometimes by Germany, sometimes by France, depending on the course of the fighting. On a battlefield he met young Christians. They used to pray together and read the Bible, at first, to give them courage. Reading the Bible made an impact on them as they wanted to know more about what they were reading. On several occasions, Kuen was in danger of death, especially when he was sent to the front. Each time he came out unscathed, he believed it was a miracle, that God preserved him. When he was called up for forced labor service in Germany and in order to avoid exile, he went into exile in Switzerland (1943). There he came into contact with the Emmaüs Institute in Vennes sur Lausanne, and began to collaborate with various churches in the city. At the end of 1944, he returned to France and served in the French army, joining the Baptist Church of Mulhouse.

In 1945 he returned to Strasbourg to work as a teacher of literature and music at the Lycée Kléber. After the war, Kuen was reunited with his friends in Strasbourg and rebuilt his former Bible study group as an independent church (between Assembly of Brethren and Baptist Church) under the name and with them, he founded the evangelical church Église Évangélique La Bonne Nouvelle in Strasbourg and served as an elder/pastor for 25 years, until he left the city in 1976. In 1947 he married and worked as a teacher at the Strasbourg Normal School until 1976. Kuen assisted by other teachers initiated and coordinated the translation of La Bible du Semeur and the Bible d'étude du Semeur.

=== Academic work ===
He wrote over 90 books, including the 8-volume Encyclopédies des difficultés bibliques, and Parole Vivante, which transcribed the Nouveau Testament in a vocabulary accessible to everyone.

After retiring at the age of 55, Alfred Kuen became director of the Association d'Accréditation Européenne des Écoles Bibliques. He also became director of Emmaüs Editions and professor at the Institut Biblique of the same name, in Vevey, Switzerland, until the age of 94.

He is the author of numerous books translated into several languages, including his scholarly Introductions to the New Testament and his commentaries on the Gospels and Acts, the letters of Paul, the General Epistles and Revelation.

== Works ==
=== Books ===
- Kuen, Alfred (2005-11-01). Encyclopedie des difficultes bibliques 7. Les epitres generales (in French). Vol. 7. Editions Emmaüs. ISBN 9782828700959.
- Kuen, Alfred (2006-11-01). Encyclopédie des difficultés bibliques 1. Pentateuque (in French). Vol. 1. Editions Emmaüs. ISBN 9782828701055.
- Kuen, Alfred (2009-02-15). Encyclopédie des difficultés bibliques 2a. Les livres historiques : Josué a Samuel (in French). Vol. 2a. Editions Emmaüs. ISBN 9782828701185.
- Kuen, Alfred (2010-01-01). Encyclopédie des difficultés bibliques 2b. Les Livres historiques de Rois à Esther (in French). Vol. 2b. Editions Emmaüs. ISBN 9782828701192.
- Kuen, Alfred (2009-03-19). Encyclopédie des difficultés bibliques 3. Livres poétiques (in French). Vol. 3. Editions Emmaüs. ISBN 9782828701208.

Encyclopédie des difficultés bibliques 3. Livres poétiques
