= Annie Vallotton =

Swiss and French artist

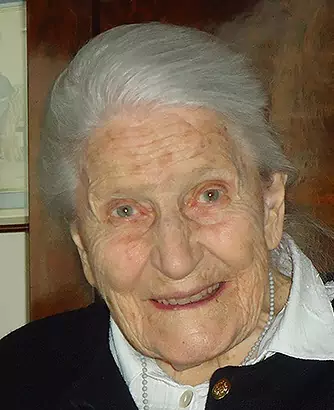
Annie Vallotton (Circa. 2007)

Anne Marie Vallotton (21 February 1915 – 28 December 2013) was a Swiss and French artist best known for her illustrations in the Good News Bible. According to HarperCollins, Vallotton is the bestselling artist of all time, thanks to worldwide sales of the Good News Bible in excess of 225 million.

== Early life ==
Vallotton was born in Lausanne, Switzerland, the daughter of Swiss writer, teacher and journalist Benjamin Vallotton who had studied theology in Munich and Paris; her mother had been born in Alsace, the granddaughter of a Lutheran pastor. Her father's cousin was the painter, Félix Vallotton. During World War II, she and her sister Gritou worked for the Resistance; she used her Swiss nationality to help her transport mail. Vallotton also worked in a refugee centre in Toulouse where she painted murals on the walls in attempt to make them more welcoming to families from Poland, Estonia and other Baltic states. While at the centre, Vallotton befriended Resistance fighter Berty Albrecht who had been baptized by Vallotton's grandfather.

== Career as an Illustrator ==
A lifelong Christian, Vallotton set out to simplify the Gospel message with the use of illustration. Aside from the Good News Bible, her works include From the Apple to the Moon, (1970), Who Are You Jesus (1973), The Man who said No: Story of Jonah (1977) and The Mighty One and Sam, (1982). Prior to her success with the Good News Bible, her only work had been one called Priority, a collection of 60 illustrations covering the life of Jesus and considered so unmarketable by her agent that he dumped 3,000 copies in the Seine. At Eurofest '75, the Billy Graham organised conference in Belgium, Vallotton gave an illustrated talk on an overhead projector, fitted with an acetate scroll, each morning before the Bible exposition.

== Good News For Modern Man ==
In the early 1960s, impressed by the illustrations he had seen in Priority, New York publisher Eugene Nida contacted Vallotton about illustrating a children's Bible. After a ten-minute meeting with Nida at Stuttgart Airport, Vallotton agreed to begin work on the Good News For Modern Man Bible. Vallotton created over 500 illustrations and drew some of them up to 90 times to get them right. Vallotton's distinctive style uses simple lines and shading to convey character and emotion: “I wanted to simplify them the most I could. I wanted to get to the truth... the most important thing!”

== Later life ==
Vallotton continued to illustrate religious books after her success with the Good News Bible. She also designed six stained-glass windows depicting the Creation at the Reformed Church of Saint-Dié-des-Vosges in Lorraine, northeastern France where her brother Paul Vallotton was the minister. In later life she had a storytelling ministry to children at a Protestant church in Paris.
