= All Hallows-on-the-Wall =

Coordinates: 51°30′59.77″N 0°5′3.60″W

- Guild Church of All Hallows on the Wall
- All Hallows London Wall
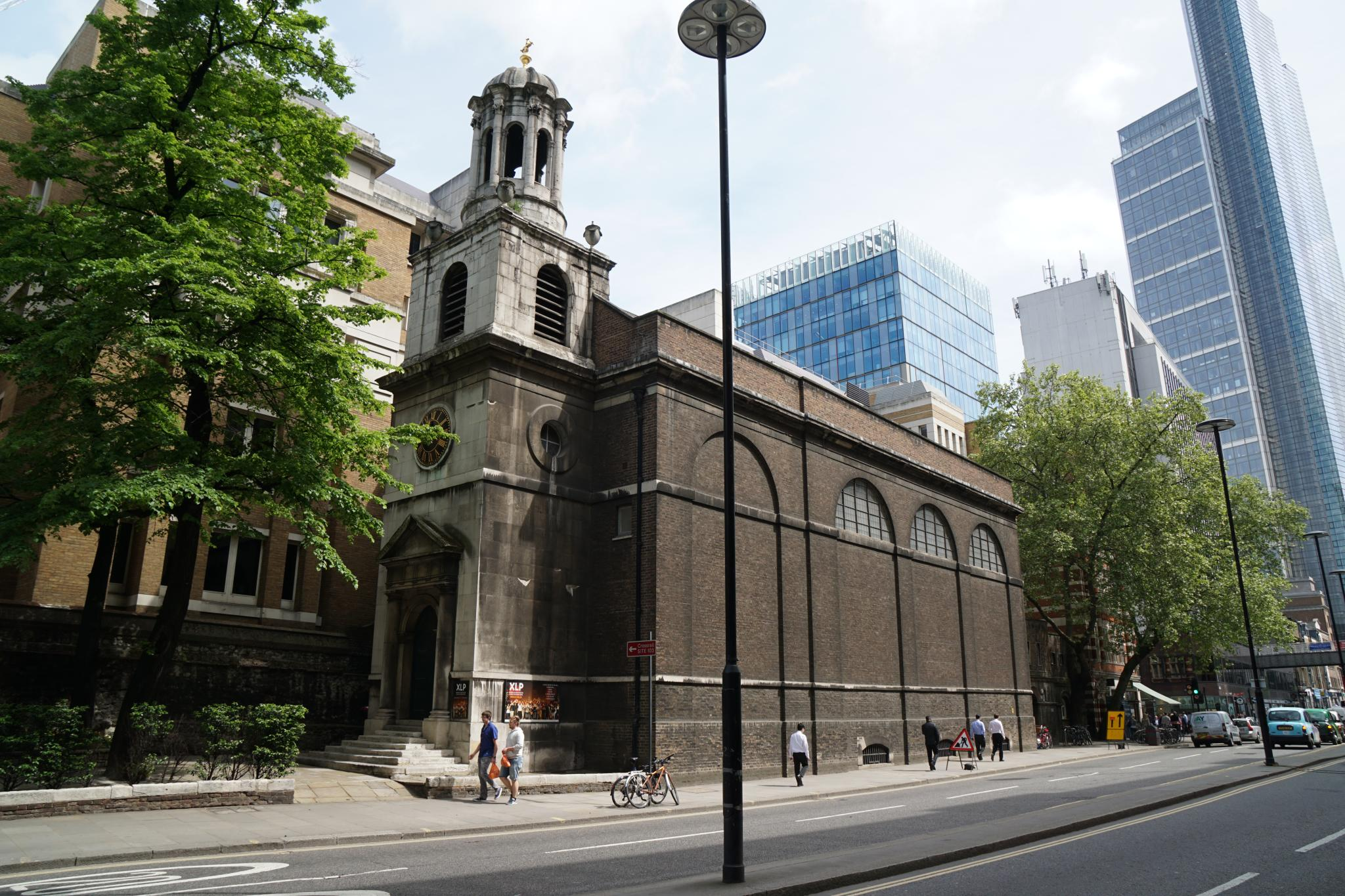

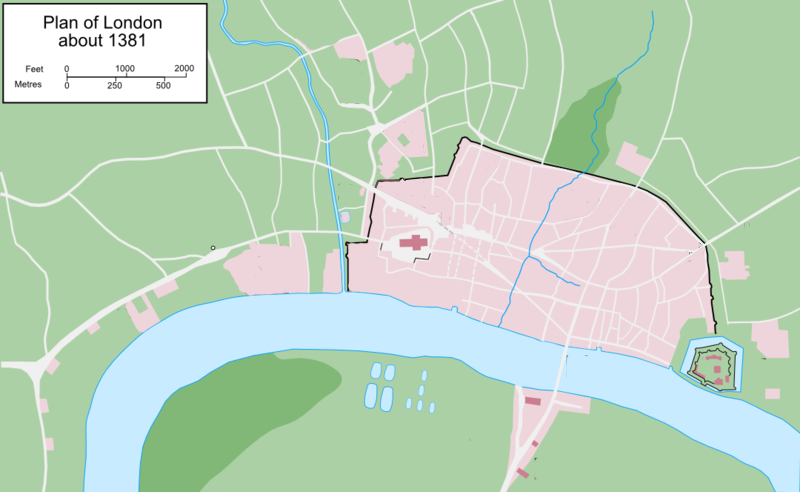
- Location within City of London Location within City of London in 1300
- Address: 83 London Wall, London
- Country: England
- Language: English
- Denomination: Church of England
- Previous denomination: Roman Catholic (to 1538); Greek Orthodox Antiochan (1997–98)
- Website: squaremilechurches.co.uk/our-churches/church/all-hallows-london-wall/

History
- Founded: Early 12th century
- Dedication: All Saints

Architecture
- Heritage designation: Grade I listed building
- Architect: George Dance the Younger
- Style: Neoclassical / Georgian
- Years built: 1767

Administration
- Diocese: London

All Hallows-on-the-Wall is a Church of England church located in the City of London. Its name refers to its location, inside and adjacent to London Wall, the former city wall.

== History ==
The present church was constructed by George Dance the Younger in 1767, replacing an earlier church built some time in the early 12th century on a bastion of the old Roman wall. It became renowned for its hermits, who lived in cells in the church. All Hallows escaped destruction in the Great Fire of London in 1666 due to its position under the wall, but subsequently fell into dereliction.

Dance rebuilt the church when he was only 24 years old. He had recently returned from Italy where he had conducted detailed studies of Classical buildings. The new All Hallows took its inspiration from the Classical world and was remarkably simple in form, with no aisles; its interior consists solely of a barrel-vaulted nave with a half-dome apse at the far end, with decoration deriving from the ancient Temple of Venus and Rome in the city of Rome. Attached Ionic columns support a frieze, rather than the usual entablature. The exterior is plain and of brick, except for the stone-faced tower above the porch at the west end.

The church was noted for its work in offering its services to the poor; many workers, including women in domestic service, would take the early trains into the City to avoid peak fares. A demand for services and refreshment in the Parish led to the vicar of the church, the Reverend Sir Montague Fowler, 4th Baronet, third son of Sir John Fowler, to operate services for their benefit. This was a popular initiative (which also had tents constructed in the churchyard to provide refreshments) which led to the construction of the buildings behind the church which were to be used as an educational institute. Because of this the church had one of the largest congregations in the City at a time when many City churches were beginning to seem redundant.

All Hallows was damaged during the Second World War but was restored in the early 1960s. It is a guild church associated with the Worshipful Company of Carpenters, which has held its annual elections in the church for over 600 years. Until 1994, it was the headquarters of the Council for the Care of Churches. On 14 December 1994 the Council for the Care of Churches and the Cathedrals Fabric Commission for England moved out of All Hallows, leaving the church empty for two and a half years. Then in April 1997 the London and South East Team of Christian Aid were given use of the building and Garth Hewitt, the Team Leader, was appointed Guild Vicar and licensed by the Bishop of London on 18 June 1997. All Hallows went on to become the centre of a thriving community for Christian Aid and its supporters, becoming a centre for issues of Justice, Development and Peace. Under the wing of Christian Aid other organisations have been based at All Hallows, including the Community Fundraising Unit of Christian Aid, the Amos Trust (a small charity with a commitment to justice issues), The Time of Our Lives (the archbishop of Canterbury's Millennium youth event organised from the crypt of All Hallows), and Greenbelt festivals (an arts festival with a Christian viewpoint and a partner of Christian Aid). Under Archpriest Michael Harper, the English-speaking Antiochian Orthodox congregation temporarily worshipped on Sunday mornings and during Holy Week evening services from 1997 for about 18 months.

The church was designated a Grade I listed building on 4 January 1950.

== Current use ==
From 2014 All Hallows became the headquarters of the urban youth charity XLP, and the home of City Gates Church, London. XLP creates positive futures for young people in impoverished urban areas. It combats bullying and intimidation, weapons, and gangs. It develops a response to boredom due to a lack of organised activities, absent parents, and living in areas with a high crime rate. The church is often used to host XLP events and has received an annual visit from the Duke and Duchess of Cambridge.

City Gates Church is a congregation with roots in the British New Church Movement, and Ichthus Christian Fellowship. It meets at All Hallows at 11am every week, and is the first community to hold regular services there since 1941. City Gates builds on All Hallows’ previous traditions of serving the poor. It runs the Better Job Project, English Conversation Classes, live music nights and other events. Covid19 brought activities to a halt. The church resumed its meetings in September 2021, and returned to serving the community with its projects in December 2022.

== Notable parishioners ==
- Robert Woodford, a lawyer who is best known as the author of an extensive diary that covers the period 1637-1641, married Hannah Haunch at All Hallows in 1635.
- Samuel John Stone was Rector of All Hallows until 1900.

== See also ==
- List of churches and cathedrals of London
