= Gustavo Parajón =

Nicaraguan doctor and pastor

- Born: November 22, 1935; Nicaragua
- Died: March 13, 2011 (aged 75); Managua, Nicaragua
- Occupations: Doctor, Pastor
- Known for: Peacemaking, Healthcare in Nicaragua

Gustavo Parajón was a Nicaraguan doctor and pastor, most known for his peacemaking efforts during the Contra War and his contributions to rural health care, vaccination campaigns, and disaster relief in Nicaragua.

Parajón attended Denison University, Case Western Reserve University School of Medicine, Harvard School of Public Health and earned a master's degree in Public Health before returning to Nicaragua.

He founded the Nicaragua Vaccination and Community Development Program (PROVADENIC) in 1967 in order to facilitate vaccination in rural areas of Nicaragua, beginning with smallpox, tuberculosis, leprosy, and polio vaccines administered via a jet injector. PROVADENIC also trained locals in basic health practices to maintain prevention efforts.

Parajón also helped found the Council of Protestant Churches of Nicaragua (CEPAD) on December 23, 1972, in response to a massive earthquake that devastated Managua, Nicaragua. CEPAD facilitated disaster relief within four days, quickly became the largest relief organization in the country, and later expanded to other development programs.

Parajón played several key roles in bringing about the end of the Contra War. He visited Washington D.C. to raise awareness of what was happening in Nicaragua. He hosted the American volunteers who came to Nicaragua as part of the Witness for Peace campaign and traveled with them and other peace commissions. He traveled unarmed, without bodyguards. In 1987, Parajón worked with an organization comprising Nicaraguan Moravian Church leaders and U.S. Mennonites headed by John Paul Lederach to mediate conflict between the Sandinista Nicaraguan government and the Contras. Afterward, Parajón served as a citizen representative of Nicaragua during the discussions that led to the Esquipulas Peace Agreement.
