= Peter Grant (abbé) =

Portrait of Grant by Angelica Kauffman, 1761.

Abbé Peter Grant (15 August 1708 – 1 September 1784) was a Scottish Roman Catholic priest, agent for the Scottish Catholic Mission and, later in life, an important liaison for British Catholic visitors in Rome.

== Life ==
Grant was born in the diocese of Moray, a member of the Grant family of Blairfind in Glenlivet. He was a Gaelic speaker. He entered the Scotch College at Rome in 1726, and returned to Scotland as a priest in 1735. He was sent to the mission at Glengarry. There he remained until 1737, when, after the murder of the Scottish Catholic Mission's Roman agent Stuart, he was appointed to fill that office. In Rome he occupied apartments in the Piazza di Navona.

He became valued as a well-connected contact by British travellers visiting Rome, and rendered them many services. Indeed, his reputation for high connections earned him the name l'introduttore. Although widely regarded as a Jacobite, he secured the patronage as cicerone of influential visitors, including William Beckford, Lord Shelburne, Lady Mary Wortley Montagu, Sir James Grant and Lord Hope. He also acted as chaperone to Catherine Read and Anne Forbes. For a long period hardly any British subject of distinction visited Rome without being provided with letters of introduction to the Abbé Grant. Clement XIV was very fond of him, and intended to create him a Cardinal; but died before doing this.

Grant died at Rome on 1 September 1784.
