= List of The Colbert Report episodes (2013) =

- No. of episodes: 157

Release
- Original network: Comedy Central

Season chronology
- ← Previous; 2012 episodes Next → 2014 episodes

This is a list of episodes for The Colbert Report in 2013.

== 2013 ==
=== January ===
No.	"The Wørd"	Guest(s)	Introductory phrase	Original release date	Prod. code
1,131	TBA	Jimmy Wales	It's 2013. Suck it Mayans.	January 7	9039
Republicans agree to tax the wealthy, a coin solves the debt ceiling debate, Bill O'Reilly insults Asians, and Jimmy Wales shares Wikipedia's next steps.
1,132	TBA	Chris Kluwe	Jimmy Kimmel starts his new 11:35 time slot tonight, but since he's my direct competition I refuse to mention him.	January 8	9040
The Forever Stamp skyrockets in value, blood transfusions restore youthfulness, the Senate questions Zero Dark Thirty, and Chris Kluwe defends same-sex marriage.
1,133	TBA	Neil Shubin	2012 was the hottest year on record. We think, the record book burst into flames.	January 9	9041
Idaho builds a firearms village, the NRA solves gun violence with more guns, wheat addiction spirals, and Neil Shubin explores humans' shared history with rocks.
1,134	TBA	Ben Gibbard	N/A	January 10	9042
A man makes love to a couch, Obama flaunts his testosterone-filled Cabinet, Kevin Garnett hassles Carmelo Anthony, and musician Ben Gibbard grows up.
1,135	TBA	Piers Morgan	N/A	January 14	9043
Joe Biden develops gun law recommendations, Ted Nugent references Rosa Parks, a nonprofit disputes Vitaminwater, and Piers Morgan talks gun control.
1,136	TBA	Jared Diamond	A shipment of 18 human heads showed up at O'Hare International Airport, when I clearly said I was flying to Omaha.	January 15	9044
Lance Armstrong spends hours with Oprah, Stephen runs Extra Special Report on Florida's mystery monkey, and Jared Diamond examines traditional New Guinea Culture.
1,137	TBA	Tom Brokaw	A Utah smoothie shop is charging an extra fee to liberal customers. That is really gotta sting for Utah's liberal.	January 16	9045
HSBC launders cartel money, Matt Taibbi chews out big banks, Pat Robertson educates "slatternly" wives, and Tom Brokaw tells the plight of second presidential terms.
1,138	"United We Standoff"	Akhil Reed Amar	N/A	January 17	9046
Subway cons consumers, President Obama tightens gun control, Megyn Kelly reveals her porn name, and Akhil Reed Amar shares his book, "America's Unwritten Constitution."
1,139	TBA	Ta-Nehisi Coates	Atari has filed for bankruptcy today, but they're thinking about just taking it out, blowin' on it and seeing if it'll work again.	January 21	9047
Obama launches the Presidential Pride Parade, Kate Middleton contaminates America, and Ta-Nehisi Coates reflects on Obama's second inauguration.
1,140	"Win, Lose, or Redraw"	Kathryn Bigelow	N/A	January 22	9048
Obama obscures America's hopelessness in his speech, Republicans pursue advanced redistricting, Dustin Hoffman shrinks his cast, and Kathryn Bigelow talks Zero Dark Thirty.
1,141	TBA	Sally Field	N/A	January 23	9049
Beyonce-Gate riles the media, Ayn Rand admirers find love, Virginia Republicans surprise Democrats with new districts, and Sally Field describes her character in Lincoln.
1,142	TBA	Tavi Gevinson	N/A	January 24	9050
France sends troops into Mali, Edward Berenson outlines French martial history, Hillary Clinton answers questions about Benghazi, and Tavi Gevinson chats about "Rookie."
1,143	"The New Abnormal"	Michael Shellenberger	Axe Body Spray has announced a contest that will send the winner to space, still not far enough to get away from the smell.	January 28	9051
The TSA abandons nude scanners, Australia and conservatives cope with climate change, North Korea goes after America, and Michael Shellenberger debates energy sources.
1,144	TBA	George Saunders	Eating lunch earlier can help you lose weight. That's why I always eat tomorrow's lunch tonight.	January 29	9052
Iran launches a monkey into space, states work to nullify Obama's gun grab, Cliff Sloan explains supreme law, Gitmo stays open, and George Saunders boasts about short stories.
1,145	"It Gets Worse"	Bill Gates	The truth will set you free. So convicted murderers, turn off your TVs now.	January 30	9053
Gay men stress less, Paul Clement defends DOMA in court, the KKK drops its racist message, and Bill Gates shares global health updates.
1,146	TBA	Matthew Guerrieri	N/A	January 31	9054
Super Bowl ads release teasers, Gatorade does away with BVO, a clever crow uses utensils, and Matthew Guerrieri explores Beethoven's cultural impact.

=== February ===
No.	"The Wørd"	Guest(s)	Introductory phrase	Original release date	Prod. code
1,147	TBA	Sonia Sotomayor	Fidel Castro made his first public appearance in three years, then he saw his shadow, so fifty more years of communism!	February 4	9055
A blackout stalls the Super Bowl, Senate members tackle immigration reform, Barack Obama claims to enjoy skeet shooting, and Justice Sonia Sotomayor details My Beloved World.
1,148	TBA	Julie Andrews	A math professor has discovered a new seventeen million digit prime number. His other discovery, he is very lonely.	February 5	9056
A parking lot covers up royal remains, CBS brings unemployment to reality TV, Californians thank a hatchet-armed hitchhiker, and Julie Andrews responds to kids' book critics.
1,149	TBA	Lawrence Wright	Home Depot is going to hire 80,000 new workers for the spring. You know where they can find some cheap labor? In their parking lot.	February 6	9057
Lobbyists try to save the penny, Elizabeth Colbert-Busch takes on 16 GOP candidates, and Lawrence Wright confirms abuse within the Church of Scientology.
1,150	TBA	Benh Zeitlin	A new poll says that Fox News is both the most trusted name and the least trusted name in the news. See? They do report both sides of the story.	February 7	9058
A snowstorm slams the Northeast, Senator Stacey Campfield homes in on kids' sexuality, Facebook promotes hookups, and Benh Zeitlin explores Louisiana's Bathtub country.
1,151	TBA	Garry Wills	N/A	February 11	9059
The Bush family gets hacked, Pope Benedict becomes the first pope to resign in 717 years, Father Jim Martin details papal appointment, and Garry Wills talks priests.
1,152	TBA	Roger Hodge	Ted Nugent will attend The State of The Union tonight, or as deer call it, the greatest night of their lives.	February 12	9060
The GOP holds a conference to self-reflect, Karl Rove targets Tea Party movement, Steven Seagal trains volunteer gun posses, and Roger Hodge touts Southern literature.
1,153	TBA	Dave Grohl	N/A	February 13	9061
President Obama focuses on the middle class and infrastructure, Marco Rubio suffers from dry mouth, and Dave Grohl relives rock 'n' roll history.
1,154	TBA	Gavin Newsom	N/A	February 14	9062
A fertility feast leads to Valentine's Day, the Obama administration targets S&P, and "Citizenville" author Gavin Newsom brings government into the digital age.
1,155	TBA	Emily Bazelon	N/A	February 19	9063
A meteor streaks over Russia, Detroit gleans a libertarian investor, Obama goes golfing with Tiger Woods, and Emily Bazelon explores the culture of bullying.
1,156	TBA	David Goldhill	N/A	February 20	9064
The UK responds to a horse meat scare, Alexi Lalas assesses soccer match fixing, Norway celebrates firewood, and David Goldhill critiques health insurance.
1,157	TBA	Lil Buck	N/A	February 21	9065
A rumor links Chuck Hagel to a made-up Islamic group, for-profit incarceration teams up with football, MTV cons BET Twitter fans, and Lil Buck explains jookin'.
1,158	"Silent But Deadly"	Simon Garfield	Cuban president Raúl Castro says he'll retire in five years. Don't believe him Conan.	February 25	9066
Michelle Obama crashes the Oscars, the CDC researches gun violence, sex scandal gossip plagues the Vatican, and Simon Garfield endorses handmade maps.
1,159	TBA	Michio Kaku	Iceland is considering a ban on internet porn. Now... there is nothing to do in Iceland.	February 26	9067
Pope Benedict shares the Vatican with his successor, Jeremy Bird disrupts the natural order in Texas, Al Qaeda evades drone attacks, and Michio Kaku tracks asteroid paths.
1,160	TBA	Paola Antonelli	It's Chuck Hagel's first day as Secretary of Defense. Tomorrow we start the two-month confirmation process for his second day of work.	February 27	9068
Stephen endorses Halls cough drops, the government bugs Khalid Sheikh Mohammed's trial, John Kerry makes a case for dimwits, and Paola Antonelli shares the future of design.
1,161	TBA	Jon Favreau	Girls Gone Wild has filed for bankruptcy. Maybe those girls should have Gone Business School.	February 28	9069
Pat Robertson confirms that demons occupy garments, shops sell Pope Benedict XVI memorabilia, federal spending cuts loom, and Jon Favreau describes speech writing methods.

=== March ===
No.	"The Wørd"	Guest(s)	Introductory phrase	Original release date	Prod. code
1,162	TBA	Kirk Bloodsworth	N/A	March 4	9070
Obama confuses Star Wars with Star Trek, Stephen investigates scallop gonad research, Texas reconsiders gun training, and Kirk Bloodsworth opposes the death penalty.
1,163	TBA	James Franco	Queen Elizabeth has been released from the hospital for what they say is a stomach bug. Either that, or there's another Royal Baby on the way.	March 5	9071
Hugo Chavez passes away, Obama travels to Israel, Michael Oren discusses Iran, married couples retreat to Mars, and James Franco talks "Oz."
1,164	TBA	Brendan O'Connell	N/A	March 6	9072
The media introduces "Snowquester," Alabama calls the Voting Rights Act into question, Michael Bloomberg bans soda deliveries, and Wal-Mart inspires Brendan O'Connell.
1,165	TBA	John Sexton	N/A	March 7	9073
Rand Paul talks for 13 hours, North Korea creates an ominous music video, The Bachelor incites emotionally charged staring, and John Sexton compares baseball and religion.
1,166	TBA	Junot Diaz	N/A	March 25	9074
The Vatican welcomes Pope Francis, Roma Downey stars in The Bible, Trevor Potter memorializes Ham Rove, and Junot Diaz shares the Freedom University project.
1,167	"Narcicitizenship"	Eric Topol	N/A	March 26	9075
Republicans contemplate a Celebrity Task Force, Senator Rob Portman flip-flops on gay marriage, and Eric Topol shares his book, "The Creative Destruction of Medicine."
1,168	TBA	Carl Edgar Blake II	Jon Hamm is sick of everyone talking about his giant penis, so media... you can start talking about mine.	March 27	9076
Papa Bear reassess gay marriage, scientists study Facebook "Likes," Tennessee lawmakers mistrust a mop sink, and Carl Edgar Blake II shows off his pigs.
1,169	TBA	Robert Lustig	N/A	March 28	9077
Same-sex marriage divides the Supreme Court, Emily Bazelon explains Proposition 8 and the Defense of Marriage Act, and Robert Lustig warns against sugar.

=== April ===
No.	"The Wørd"	Guest(s)	Introductory phrase	Original release date	Prod. code
1,170	TBA	Sigourney Weaver	This is NOT The Colbert Report... April Fools... This is The Colbert Report.	April 1	9078
Google pays tribute to Cesar Chavez, Pope Francis breaks a New Testament tradition, Tennessee uses a health care lottery, and Sigourney Weaver talks theater.
1,171	TBA	Jim McGreevey	N/A	April 2	9079
Sue Everhart warns of gay marriage fraud, Victor Cha dissects North Korea's bomb threats, Florida plans to outlaw bongs, and Jim McGreevey advocates in-prison rehab.
1,172	TBA	A.C. Grayling	N/A	April 3	9080
Mark Sanford runs against Elizabeth Colbert Busch, Louie Gohmert compares gun control to bestiality, the GOP surveys young people, and A.C. Grayling talks God and reason.
1,173	TBA	Francis Collins	The Queen of England just got a 7.5 million dollar raise. It was that or lose her to the Miami Heat.	April 4	9081
An Exxon pipeline bursts in Arkansas, Jeremy Irons compares gay marriage to incest, and NIH Director Francis Collins explains Obama's BRAIN Initiative.
1,174	TBA	Bill Clinton	N/A	April 8	9082
At the Clinton Global Initiative University Meeting, President Bill Clinton discusses foreign aid, poverty, TED Talks, Twitter and the Colbert Galactic Initiative.
1,175	TBA	Charlie LeDuff	Scientists discovered a new tarantula that's the size of a human face. Correction, the size of a screaming human face.	April 9	9083
Stephen attends the Clinton Global Initiative University Exchange, Exxon sweeps oil into storm drains, and Charlie LeDuff shares his book, "Detroit: An American Autopsy."
1,176	TBA	Shane Smith	N/A	April 10	9084
The Navy builds a laser missile, Senate Republicans give in to gun control, Anthony Weiner ponders the mayoral race, and VICE cofounder Shane Smith talks storytelling.
1,177	TBA	Cass Sunstein	N/A	April 11	9085
NASA develops an asteroid lasso, Nick Gillespie talks about pot legalization, New York City targets filthy Times Square mascots, and Cass Sunstein slams the food pyramid.
1,178	TBA	Caroline Kennedy	Here's what I know... These maniacs may have tried to make life bad for the people of Boston, but all they can ever do, is show just how good those people are.	April 16	9086
Terrorists attack the Boston Marathon, Canada manufactures Sexcereal, the Rollie Eggmaster cooks up gelatinous egg rods, and Caroline Kennedy recites poetry with Stephen.
1,179	TBA	Alan Cumming	N/A	April 17	9087
The media dreams up Boston bombing suspects, Adam Davidson explains Bitcoin, Brad Paisley makes a sucky song about racism, and Alan Cumming tackles an almost one-man play.
1,180	TBA	Richard Engel	N/A	April 18	9088
The New York Post misidentifies Boston bombing suspects, Stephen debuts the Bucket, the Senate opposes gun background checks, and Richard Engel describes Syrian militias.
1,181	TBA	Michael Pollan	Today is the 43rd Annual Earth Day. At that age, no wonder its ice caps are receding.	April 22	9089
The Boston manhunt ends, Canadian police expose an Al Qaeda plot, America's infrastructure earns a bad grade, and Michael Pollan describes the four ways of cooking.
1,182	TBA	Eric Schmidt	N/A	April 23	9090
Chris Christie is full of Scooby-Doo-doo, Thomas Herndon takes down Reinhart and Rogoff, and Google's Eric Schmidt talks digital identities.
1,183	TBA	Danica Patrick	N/A	April 24	9091
Twitter hackers trigger a market crash, Bill Clinton picks a dignified Twitter name, the Mars rover draws a penis in the sand, and NASCAR's Danica Patrick manages her rage.
1,184	TBA	Gene Robinson	TBA	April 25	9092
Stephen starts an "O" Book Club, Matt Cartwright speaks Spanish, Fox & Friends gets the word out about a guy singing like a canary, and Gene Robinson advocates gay rights.
1,185	"We Shall Undermine"	Iggy And The Stooges	A Wisconsin woman called police after seeing kittens having sex in her yard. Quick! No one show her the internet.	April 29	9093
Jason Collins comes out as gay, New Zealand sanctions same-sex marriage, conservatives get defensive, criminals turn to Yelp, and Iggy Pop performs shirtless.
1,186	"Medical Leave"	Evan Spiegel & Bobby Murphy	A new study says fish use sign language. Maybe now I can figure out what all that flopping around on the bottom of my boat means.	April 30	9094
Congress disregards the Army's wishes, Iowa cracks illegal immigration, Budweiser encourages Facebook friendships, and Evan Spiegel and Bobby Murphy make photos disappear.

=== May ===
No.	"The Wørd"	Guest(s)	Introductory phrase	Original release date	Prod. code
1,187	"N.R.A-vana"	Macklemore & Ryan Lewis	N/A	May 1	9095
A Newtown victim's daughter confronts Senator Kelly Ayotte, pro-gun senators lose voters' support, and Macklemore and Ryan Lewis share their album, The Heist.
1,188	TBA	Ben Kingsley	A man arrested for shooting at the White House says he was upset over US marijuana laws. Man, if only there was some way to mellow that guy out.	May 2	9096
The Feds identify three accomplices in the Boston bombings, President Obama addresses the Gitmo hunger strike, and Sir Ben Kingsley chats about Iron Man 3.
1,189	TBA	Robert Caro	Chris Christie killed a spider. It picked the wrong guy to steal curds and whey from.	May 6	9097
Stephen plugs Colbert's Book Club, conspiracy theorists explain the government's ammo purchases, dogs ride the Mary Jane train, and Robert Caro scares Republicans.
1,190	TBA	Douglas Rushkoff	N/A	May 7	9098
Fox News prepares for the Benghazi whistleblowers, Rep. Donna Edwards deals with a senile senior, teens amp up their promposals, and Douglas Rushkoff pinpoints the present.
1,191	TBA	Richard Besser	Deadly giant snails have been found in Houston. Quick! Saunter for your lives!	May 8	9099
Stephen's sister loses her run for Congress, Republicans spite Obama, parents forego diapers, and Richard Besser shares his book, "Tell Me the Truth, Doctor."
1,192	TBA	Baz Luhrmann	N/A	May 9	9100
Carey Mulligan divulges a dark secret, Jennifer Egan discusses The Great Gatsby's place in American letters, and Baz Luhrmann pays homage to F. Scott Fitzgerald.
1,193	TBA	Jessica Buchanan & Erik Landemalm	N/A	May 13	9101
The Obama administration lies about Benghazi talking points, the IRS inspects Tea Party groups, and Jessica Buchanan and Erik Landemalm share their book, "Impossible Odds."
1,194	TBA	Dan Brown	Business networking site LinkedIn is cracking down on prostitutes. Now if they'd just crack down on those people who keep inviting me to join LinkedIn.	May 14	9102
The House tries to repeal Obamacare again, an immigration study slams Hispanics, Maxim honors Miley Cyrus, and Dan Brown takes inspiration from Dante.
1,195	TBA	Cyndi Lauper	N/A	May 15	9103
The UN describes bugs as "mini-livestock," Congresswoman Gwen Moore rides shotgun, and Cyndi Lauper outlines her Broadway musical, "Kinky Boots".
1,196	TBA	Daniel Lieberman	A prison inmate is suing Taco Bell for stealing his Doritos Taco Shell idea. And also for his Doritos Taco Shiv idea.	May 16	9104
Congress peppers and grills Eric Holder, China seeks peace in the Middle East, a nonprofit provides access to printable guns, and Daniel Lieberman endorses toe shoes.
1,197	TBA	David Sassoon	N/A	May 20	9105
ABC's Jonathan Karl lies about the Benghazi scandal, Stephen applies for Tea Party tax exemption, and David Sassoon from InsideClimate News shares his e-book, "The Dilbit Disaster."
1,198	TBA	Noah Feldman	A London auction house is offering a rare Christmas card signed by Adolf Hitler. Even more rare... His Happy Hanukkah card.	May 21	9106
Scientists solve the mystery of the Great Famine of Ireland, pot boosts metabolism, Rep. Jeff Duncan plans to ban the census, and Noah Feldman describes the Cool War with China.
1,199	TBA	The National	A Minnesota man found a comic book inside the walls of his house that's worth over $100,000, but be careful, its only valuable if you keep it in its original wall.	May 22	9107
Lois Lerner won't spill the IRS scandal beans, Mitch McConnell endorses hemp, PBS appeases David H. Koch regarding Citizen Koch, and The National shares their album "Trouble Will Find Me."
1,200	TBA	Christopher Chivers	N/A	May 23	9108
Barack Obama addresses his usage of drones, Andrew Bacevich thinks war is bad, Pope Francis embraces atheists, and C.J. Chivers reports on Syrian rebels.

=== June ===
Taping of June 13, 17 and 18 was cancelled due to the death of Colbert's mother.

No.	"The Wørd"	Guest(s)	Introductory phrase	Original release date	Prod. code
1,201	TBA	John Dingell	N/A	June 3	9109
Mark Pocan tempts Stephen with divorce, precision-guided guns promote skill-free killing, and John Dingell wants Congress to learn how to compromise.
1,202	TBA	Alex Gibney	N/A	June 4	9110
The Report pays tribute to Michele Bachmann, NASA researches printable food, the IRS invests in line dancing, and Alex Gibney explores WikiLeaks.
1,203	TBA	Jonathan Alter	The TSA has dropped its plans to allow golf clubs on airplanes. Great, now the putting green in First Class is useless.	June 5	9111
Superman gets a makeover, Laurie Garrett reviews Monsanto's wheat incident, the Chicago Sun-Times scraps photojournalism, and Jonathan Alter dissects the 2012 election.
1,204	TBA	T-Bone Burnett, Stephen King, & John Mellencamp	N/A	June 6	9112
The Obama administration snoops on Verizon customers, Stephen becomes a spy, and Stephen King writes a musical with John Mellencamp and T Bone Burnett.
1,205	TBA	Dan Savage	N/A	June 10	9113
The NSA whistle-blower explains himself, violent protests break out in Turkey, missile launch officers dislike their jobs, and Dan Savage criticizes DOMA.
1,206	TBA	Daniel Bergner	Mayor Mike Bloomberg unveiled a twenty billion dollar plan to fight climate change. It will limit the oceans to no more than 16 ozs.	June 11	9114
Obama commits cyber snooping, dishwashers get surveillance chips, the TSA targets Chewbacca, and Daniel Bergner reveals what turns women on.
1,207	TBA	Paul McCartney	N/A	June 12	9115
The NSA builds a data compound, Paul McCartney describes his music career with The Beatles and Wings, and Michael Bloomberg's bike share "begrimes" New York.
1,208	TBA	The Postal Service	TBA	June 19	9116
Stephen honors his late mother, Cap'n Crunch lies about his rank, house flipping makes a comeback, and the Postal Service discusses their electronic music.
1,209	TBA	Joss Whedon	A new study says 70% of Americans are on prescription drugs. If you find that number depressing, talk to your doctor about Cymbalta.	June 20	9117
Iran replaces outgoing President Mahmoud Ahmadinejad, Rep. Steve King opposes chicken cage laws, Nestle markets to higher-income women, and Joss Whedon talks Shakespeare.
1,210	"Truthinews"	Andrew Solomon	N/A	June 24	9118
NSA leaker Edward Snowden goes missing, Darrell Issa probes the IRS, news becomes truthinews, the KKK engineers a laser, and Andrew Solomon defines "exceptional" children.
1,211	TBA	Peniel Joseph	Italy's Silvio Berlusconi was convicted of paying for sex with an underage prostitute, which means it could be months before he is re-elected Prime Minister.	June 25	9119
The Supreme Court guts part of the Voting Rights Act, Brazilians protest government spending, and Peniel Joseph criticizes the Supreme Court's decision.
1,212	TBA	Bill Moyers	Scientists have found a way for paralyzed rats to regain the ability to urinate. Finally, a solution to the world's deficit of rat urine.	June 26	9120
Gay marriage gets a legal boost, Emily Bazelon analyzes the Supreme Court's decisions, and Bill Moyers chronicles the slow death of the American middle class.
1,213	TBA	Chuck Schumer	N/A	June 27	9121
Mayor Michael Bloomberg declares war on the 4th of July, the Senate enacts immigration reform, and Senator Chuck Schumer talks tattoos and gang signs.

=== July ===
No.	"The Wørd"	Guest(s)	Introductory phrase	Original release date	Prod. code
1,214	TBA	Jeremy Scahill	N/A	July 15	9122
A Florida jury acquits George Zimmerman, Stephen inspects a SkyMiles scandal, Asiana Airlines sues KTVU over made-up pilot names, and Jeremy Scahill criticizes drone strikes.
1,215	TBA	David Karp	J.K. Rowling announced that she secretly wrote a crime novel under the name Robert Galbraith. What a coincidence, I wrote a series of wizard books under the name J.K. Rowling.	July 16	9123
Britain prepares for the royal baby, George Zimmerman protestors sing instead of riot, NPR critiques multitaskers, and David Karp promises not to police Tumblr.
1,216	TBA	Jerry Seinfeld	N/A	July 17	9124
Rolling Stone features the Boston bombing suspect, Congress removes food stamps from the farm bill, and Jerry Seinfeld shares his series, Comedians in Cars Getting Coffee.
1,217	TBA	Jeff Bridges	N/A	July 18	9125
Edward Snowden seeks asylum in Russia, San Diego's mayor faces sexual harassment charges, Eliot Spitzer runs for NYC comptroller, and Jeff Bridges shares his film, R.I.P.D.
1,218	TBA	Kjerstin Gruys	N/A	July 22	9126
Kate Middleton delivers her baby, Geraldo Rivera tweets a naked selfie, fast food workers protest the minimum wage, and Kjerstin Gruys examines body image issues.
1,219	"Color-bind"	Kenneth Goldsmith	N/A	July 23	9127
The Prince of Wails is born, George Zimmerman helps a family in need, Barack Obama shares his experiences with racism and poet Kenneth Goldsmith revisits seven U.S. tragedies.
1,220	TBA	Anant Agarwal	N/A	July 24	9128
The royal couple name their baby George, Anthony Weiner apologizes for his latest sexts, Kanye West designs a blank t-shirt, and Anant Agarwal discusses his nonprofit, edX.
1,221	TBA	Olympia Snowe	N/A	July 25	9129
An MC crashes the royal birth, Detroit files for bankruptcy, Steve King incites Jorge Ramos, and Olympia Snowe shares her book, "Fighting For Common Ground."
1,222	TBA	The Lumineers	China is launching a 24-hour Panda-cam. Ohhh!!! I can't wait to see those majestic creatures assemble an iPad.	July 29	9130
FreedomWorks burns fake Obama insurance cards, North Carolina allows concealed weapons in bars, and The Lumineers share their self-titled debut album.
1,223	"Secrets & Laws"	Atul Gawande	CNN is offering dos & don'ts for summer time sex. First don't... watch CNN.	July 30	9131
The North Pole becomes a lake, Tea Partiers criticize Mitch McConnell, lawmakers brainstorm tax reform in secret, and Atul Gawande shares his article, "Slow Ideas."
1,224	TBA	Emily Matchar	Simon Cowell has reportedly impregnated his friend's wife. That is shocking! Simon Cowell has a friend?	July 31	9132
Chelsea Manning is found not guilty, Barack Obama and Hillary Clinton have lunch, Chris Christie and Rand Paul feud, and Emily Matchar shares the "new domesticity."

=== August ===
No.	"The Wørd"	Guest(s)	Introductory phrase	Original release date	Prod. code
1,225	TBA	Bryan Cranston	Science can now grow teeth from stem cells found in urine. So, careful next time your dentist says open wide.	August 1	9133
Russia protects Edward Snowden, Mayor Bob Filner blames San Diego for his sexual misconduct, Gitmo prisoners read erotic romance, and Bryan Cranston talks meth and Malcolm.
1,226	TBA	Hugh Laurie	N/A	August 5	9134
The U.S. government warns of a looming terror threat somewhere, Alex Rodriguez gets suspended for doping, and Hugh Laurie shares his blues album, Didn't It Rain.
1,227	TBA	Robin Thicke	N/A	August 6	9135
Daft Punk abandons StePhest Colbchella '013, Stephen angers his Hyundai sponsors, and Blurred Lines singer Robin Thicke saves Stephen's career.
1,228	TBA	Ashton Kutcher	N/A	August 7	9136
Online critics bash StePhest Colbchella '013, union activist Mary Kay Henry supports fast-food strikers, the SEC comes down on a trader, and Ashton Kutcher talks "Jobs."
1,229	TBA	Colum McCann	N/A	August 8	9137
CNN's doctor switches his position on pot, Matt Damon comes to Stephen's rescue, Darrell Issa wants ocean waters named after Reagan, and Colum McCann talks TransAtlantic.
1,230	TBA	Sheldon Whitehouse	N/A	August 12	9138
The Today Show features twerking, Senator Rush Holt champions public education, and Senator Sheldon Whitehouse chats about his book, On Virtues.
1,231	TBA	John Lewis	N/A	August 13	9139
Mayor Mike Bloomberg defends New York's stop-and-frisk, the TSA expands its duties, and Congressman John Lewis chats about his graphic novel, March.
1,232	TBA	Kevin Spacey	In Boston, mobster Whitey Bulger has been convicted on 31 counts. Here in New York, Tighty-Whitey Bulger continues his run for Mayor.	August 14	9140
Russia's anti-gay laws affect Olympic athletes, Obama hires psychologists to "nudge" public opinion, and Kevin Spacey talks "House of Cards."
1,233	"Gag Gift"	Richard Brodhead	N/A	August 15	9141
A rodeo clown wears an Obama mask, fracking companies put gag orders on families, Obama talks NSA transparency, and Professor Richard Brodhead promotes the humanities.

=== September ===
No.	"The Wørd"	Guest(s)	Introductory phrase	Original release date	Prod. code
1,234	TBA	Timothy Cardinal Dolan	Sunlight reflecting off a London skyscraper has been melting cars. That is shocking! There is sunlight in London?	September 3	9142
Syrian dictator Bashar al-Assad employs chemical weapons, The Daily Show gets Jon back, Rep. Dan Kildee promotes sugar beets, and Timothy Cardinal Dolan examines the papacy.
1,235	TBA	Gary England	Happy Birthday to Google, which turned 15 today. Just three more years and they can turn the safe search off.	September 4	9143
Barack Obama endorses military action in Syria, The New Yorker's Steve Coll unpacks the president's decision, and meteorologist Gary England talks twisters.
1,236	TBA	John Prine	Happy Rosh Hashanah, which we all know is the Jewish holiday of... I have no idea, my writers all left early.	September 5	9144
Ariel Castro commits suicide, kittens close down the NYC subway, Stephen assigns reading for Colbert's Book Club, and John Prine shares his folk album, "The Missing Years."
1,237	TBA	Billie Jean King	N/A	September 9	9145
Americans oppose military action in Syria, Fox News dreams up "Super Reagan," Iowa grants gun permits to blind people, and Billie Jean King recalls the "Battle of the Sexes."
1,238	TBA	Shane Salerno	N/A	September 10	9146
JD Salinger releases "The Catcher in the Rye" in 1951, Tobias Wolff debates Salinger's short stories, and Shane Salerno co-authors Salinger's biography.
1,239	TBA	Sheryl Crow	N/A	September 11	9147
New York City holds the mayoral primary, Syria agrees to surrender its chemical weapons, Rand Paul flip-flops, and Sheryl Crow discusses her album, "Feels Like Home."
1,240	TBA	Philip Mudd	N/A	September 12	9148
The New York Times prints Vladimir Putin's op-ed on Syria, Rep. Jim McDermott defends gay rights, and Philip Mudd shares his book, "Takedown: Inside the Hunt for Al Qaeda."
1,241	"The Guilted Age"	Andrew Bacevich	NPR is cutting their staff by 10%, so enjoy this week's edition of... Wait...Wait... Don't fire me.	September 16	9149
Stephen honors the Lehman Brothers, pundits criticize government "moochers," Miss America receives racist comments, and Andrew Bacevich shares his book, Breach of Trust.
1,242	TBA	Arne Duncan	A new study says 85% of users don't become addicted to meth. Unfortunately the same can't be said for viewers of Breaking Bad.	September 17	9150
Billionaires get left behind, Kanye West performs for Kazakhstan's controversial leader, Cheerios cashes in on death, and Arne Duncan endorses early education.
1,243	TBA	Nicholson Baker	N/A	September 18	9151
Andrew Sullivan supports U.N. intervention in Syria, conservatives attack gun violence in video games, and Nicholson Baker shares his book, "Traveling Sprinkler."
1,244	TBA	Jack Johnson	N/A	September 19	9152
Michelle Obama promotes H2O, Republicans regulate Obamacare navigators, Jihawg Ammo makes bacon bullets, and Jack Johnson shares his album, "From Here to Now to You."
1,245	TBA	Metallica	N/A	September 24	9153
Jon Stewart congratulates Stephen on his Emmys, Pope Francis speaks out on Catholic teachings, and Metallica presents its film, "Metallica: Through the Never."
1,246	TBA	Joseph Gordon-Levitt	N/A	September 25	9154
Google cracks down on YouTube, Fox News assesses the "war on football," Ted Cruz gives a 21-hour anti-Obamacare speech, and Joseph Gordon-Levitt describes his film, "Don Jon."
1,247	TBA	Chris Fischer	An Australian flight was grounded because there was a snake on the plane. It's just like that Samuel L. Jackson movie, Django Unchained.	September 26	9155
AmeriCone Dream shows up on "Breaking Bad," CNN's "Crossfire" encourages incoherent yelling, Rush Limbaugh writes for kids, and Chris Fischer talks sharks.
1,248	TBA	Vince Gilligan	N/A	September 30	9156
Congress shuts down the government, Butterball appeases male cooks, and "Breaking Bad" creator Vince Gilligan discusses the final season.

=== October ===
No.	"The Wørd"	Guest(s)	Introductory phrase	Original release date	Prod. code
1,249	TBA	Daniel Radcliffe	N/A	October 1	9157
The government shuts down, Americans flood the Patient Protection and Affordable Care Act website, anti-Obamacare groups target youth, and Daniel Radcliffe describes his film, "Kill Your Darlings."
1,250	TBA	Chris Matthews	The New York City Opera is closing. Well I say it isn't over until the Fat Lady doesn't sing.	October 2	9158
Barack Obama meets with congressional leaders about the government "slimdown," Bill O'Reilly talks divine inspiration, and Chris Matthews compares Obama and Reagan.
1,251	TBA	David Finkel	N/A	October 3	9159
Congressional leaders fail to compromise on the government shutdown, Stephen officiates a wedding, and David Finkel examines post-war trauma in "Thank You for Your Service."
1,252	TBA	James Spithill	N/A	October 7	9160
Republicans hold Obama responsible for the government shutdown, Emily Bazelon reviews McCutcheon v. Federal Election Commission, and James Spithill shares some history of the America's Cup.
1,253	TBA	Paul Giamatti	A new wifi tea kettle will text you when your water boils. The text reads, Why the hell did you leave your house with the kettle on?	October 8	9161
The debt ceiling looms, Eric Holder permits pro-pot laws, and Paul Giamatti talks "Parkland."
1,254	TBA	Tom Hanks	The Congressional Fitness Center is still open during the shutdown. Wow! It is really hard to get out of a gym membership.	October 9	9162
Truckers organize "Ride for the Constitution," and Tom Hanks talks about Captain Phillips (film) and Somali pirates.
1,255	TBA	Reed Albergotti & Vanessa O'Connell	N/A	October 10	9163
Hanksy dolls up Stephen's studio, and Reed Albergotti and Vanessa O'Connell discuss Lance Armstrong.
1,256	TBA	The Reflektors	N/A	October 21	9164
The government reopens, New Jersey allows gay marriage, and The Reflektors perform "Normal People."
1,257	TBA	A. Scott Berg	Researchers have developed a Breathalyzer for marijuana. Aaaaaaaaand it's already been turned into a bong.	October 22	9165
Stephen weighs in on lions and tigers, KFC invents the "Go Cup," and A. Scott Berg discusses his book, "Wilson."
1,258	TBA	Judy Woodruff & Gwen Ifill	N/A	October 23	9166
Obamacare's website crashes, Stephen investigates, and Judy Woodruff and Gwen Ifill discuss the news.
1,259	"Philanthrophy"	Stephen Fry	A new study suggests plants have the ability to tell time. Good, cause for Christmas I got my ficus a Swatch.	October 24	9167
Girly hats could emasculate the Marines, and Stephen Fry discusses his role in "Twelfth Night."
1,260	TBA	Orlando Bloom	N/A	October 28	9168
Stuffed animals go sight-seeing and Orlando Bloom discusses his Broadway turn in "Romeo and Juliet."
1,261	"On Your Feet"	Billy Collins	The Jonas Brothers have announced they're breaking up. YOKOOOOOOOOOOOOOOOO!!!	October 29	9169
Americans resort to harvesting their bodies, and Billy Collins talks about his book, "Aimless Love."
1,262	TBA	Jack Andraka	There's a national wine shortage. Great, now people in book clubs are actually going to have to read.	October 30	9170
Shepard Smith battles digital addiction, and Jack Andraka shares his passion for science.
1,263	"See No Evil"	Zach Sims	Happy Thanksgiving! April Fools. Happy Halloween.	October 31	9171
The NSA spying scandal reaches the Vatican, and Codecademy founder Zach Sims discusses programming.

=== November ===
No.	"The Wørd"	Guest(s)	Introductory phrase	Original release date	Prod. code
1,264	"Inc. God We Trust"	David Folkenflik	They say a lie gets half way around the world before the truth has a chance to get its pants on. Why did the truth have its pants off?	November 4	9172
Corporations find religion, and author David Folkenflik discusses "Murdoch's World."
1,265	TBA	Julius Erving	N/A	November 5	9173
A bong-shaped mascot upsets a Canadian town, and Julius Erving discusses "Dr. J: The Autobiography."
1,266	TBA	Brian Lehrer	N/A	November 6	9174
Toys "R" Us mocks nature, and the host of The Brian Lehrer Show discusses New York City politics.
1,267	TBA	Daniel Lieberman	N/A	November 7	9175
The Senate cracks down on sexual discrimination in the workplace, Stephen is nominated for a People's Choice Award, and author Daniel Lieberman discusses "The Story of the Human Body."
1,268	TBA	Peter Baker	N/A	November 11	9176
"60 Minutes" anchor Lara Logan apologizes for her flawed Benghazi story, and "Days of Fire" author Peter Baker discusses George W. Bush's rocky relationship with Dick Cheney.
1,269	TBA	David Christian	Lady Gaga says she's addicted to pot. So be on the lookout in case she starts exhibiting any odd behavior.	November 12	9177
HealthCare.gov glitches lead to low enrollment, France rejects a nuke deal with Iran, a luxury hotel offers poverty-themed vacations, and David Christian talks "Big History."
1,270	TBA	Blind Boys of Alabama	N/A	November 13	9178
Human Rights groups protest U.S. drone attacks, Richard Cohen faces backlash over race comments, and the Blind Boys of Alabama perform a song from "I'll Find a Way."
1,271	TBA	Alexis Ohanian	N/A	November 14	9179
Stephen calls for aid to the Philippines, The Today Show airs live prostate exams, and Alexis Ohanian discusses online democracy and his book Without Their Permission.
1,272	TBA	Steve McQueen	Butterball warns that there may be a turkey shortage. Apparently they were caught off guard by this whole Thanksgiving thing.	November 18	9180
The Colbert Nation helps the Philippines, conservatives gloat over Obamacare, Chip Wilson defends his yoga pants, and Steve McQueen talks 12 Years A Slave.
1,273	TBA	Rick Santorum	N/A	November 19	9181
Wal-Mart hosts a food drive for its own employees, Robert Reich argues for better income equality, and Rick Santorum discusses his movie, "The Christmas Candle."
1,274	TBA	M.I.A.	Amsterdam is paying alcoholics beer to clean the streets, but you know they're just gonna spend that beer on weed.	November 20	9182
Congressman Trey Radel pleads guilty to cocaine possession, Russia cracks down on "gay propaganda," and guest M.I.A. performs a song from her album "Matangi."
1,275	TBA	J. J. Abrams	The X-Men have introduced a new character who is gay and has the power to make people like him. Wait a second, Neil Patrick Harris is a mutant?	November 21	9183
Senate Democrats go nuclear, Oklahoma Governor Mary Fallin blocks same-sex benefits, Stephen invites himself to Thanksgiving dinner, and J. J. Abrams discusses his novel, "S."

=== December ===
No.	"The Wørd"	Guest(s)	Introductory phrase	Original release date	Prod. code
1,276	TBA	Daniel Goleman	A new study found that energy drinks can alter your heart function. So Red Bull gives you wings, but they might be angel wings.	December 2	9184
HealthCare.gov relaunches, turkeys compete for Obama's pardon, Amazon embraces drones, a Christmas tree takes a bullet, and Daniel Goleman discusses his book, "Focus."
1,277	TBA	Ed Stone	North Korean Kim Jong-un reportedly fired his own uncle. No word yet whether he fired him into a mountain or the sea.	December 3	9185
The pope might lead a secret life, the FDA targets trans fat, the McRib is scrutinized, a tech firm invents an office robot, and Ed Stone discusses the Voyager missions.
1,278	TBA	Bryan Stevenson	N/A	December 4	9186
Congress's productivity hits a record low, the rich get a floating tax shelter, Common Core threatens cursive, and Bryan Stevenson argues for an equitable justice system.
1,279	TBA	Alan Mulally	Hackers have stolen the passwords of over two million internet accounts, so it's time for me to change mine from Password1 to Password2.	December 5	9187
Stephen weighs flight against invisibility, Colorado legalizes pot, the GOP learns how to talk to women, and Alan Mulally discusses the Ford Mustang's 50-year legacy.
1,280	TBA	David Keith	N/A	December 9	9188
Stephen honors Mandela, Bill O'Reilly & John Stossel discourage giving, "America Again" vies for a Grammy, and author David Keith discusses "A Case For Climate Engineering."
1,281	"Channel Serfing"	Alex Blumberg	There's a 2014 calendar of sexy New York Taxi Drivers, although back in their home countries they were sexy professors.	December 10	9189
Walmart becomes an elite institution, Virginia Postrel examines the value of television, Venezuela starts Christmas early, and Alex Blumberg discusses "The T-Shirt Project."
1,282	TBA	Elizabeth Gilbert	N/A	December 11	9190
Festivus comes to the Florida Capitol, Obama's handshake causes outrage, Mike Huckabee fights Obamacare with music, and Elizabeth Gilbert talks "The Signature of All Things."
1,283	TBA	George Packer	TBA	December 12	9191
Congress agrees on a budget, a sleeping aid has terrifying side effects, Megyn Kelly argues that Santa is white, and author George Packer discusses "The Unwinding."
1,284	TBA	Jonah Peretti	TBA	December 16	9192
Google buys a robotics company, the NSA infiltrates online games, Stephen and Billy Crystal compete for a Grammy, and Jonah Peretti discusses BuzzFeed's journalism initiative.
1,285	TBA	Garry Trudeau	George Zimmerman is auctioning an original painting for $100,000. $100,000? Man, this guys getting away with murder!	December 17	9193
Edward Snowden seeks political asylum in Brazil, China embraces pollution, Ted Cruz gets his own coloring book, and Garry Trudeau discusses his show, "Alpha House."
1,286	TBA	Keanu Reeves	Doctors say an apple a day may prevent hearty attacks. If only there were a rhyme to remember that.	December 18	9194
Customer satisfaction is worthless, Germany joins the debate over Santa's ethnicity, Keanu Reeves talks "47 Ronin," and Aaron Neville performs with members of MusiCorps.
1,287	TBA	Ben Stiller	TBA	December 19	9195
Jamie Dimon flaunts his wealth with a decadent Christmas card, A&E suspends Phil Robertson for anti-gay remarks, and Ben Stiller talks "The Secret Life of Walter Mitty."
