= List of The Colbert Report episodes (2014) =

- No. of episodes: 160

Release
- Original network: Comedy Central

Season chronology
- ← Previous; 2013 episodes Next → Season 2015

The Colbert Report is an American late-night talk and news satire television program hosted by Stephen Colbert that aired four days a week on Comedy Central beginning in 2005, and running for 1,447 episodes. The show focuses on a fictional anchorman character named Stephen Colbert, played by his real-life namesake. The character, described by Colbert as a "well-intentioned, poorly informed, high-status idiot", is a caricature of televised political pundits.

2014 was the final year of the series; the final episode aired on December 18, 2014.

== January ==
No.	"The Wørd"	Guest(s)	Introductory phrase	Original release date	Prod. code
1,288	TBA	Kenneth Roth	It is really cold.	January 6	9196
America endures a polar vortex, the FDA targets antibiotics in livestock, recreational weed goes on sale in Colorado, and Ken Roth discusses Human Rights Watch.
1,289	TBA	John Seigenthaler	TBA	January 7	9197
Donald Trump takes on global warming, Pope Francis criticizes wealth disparity, scientists look for time travelers online, and John Seigenthaler discusses Al Jazeera America.
1,290	TBA	Ishmael Beah	Happy Birthday to North Korea's Kim Jong-un. Please accept our gift of Dennis Rodman. No returns.	January 8	9198
Scandal engulfs Chris Christie, the media explains the concept of cold weather, and Ishmael Beah talks being a child soldier and his book, Radiance of Tomorrow.
1,291	TBA	Jeffrey Skoll	TBA	January 9	9199
Chris Christie's bridge scandal deepens, Robert Gates's Duty has harsh words for Obama, and Jeff Skoll discusses his film company, Participant Media.
1,292	"Never-Ender's Game"	David Fanning	The new Ford F-150 is made of 97% aluminum. Which means it's lighter, but you can't put it in the microwave.	January 13	9200
A chemical spill threatens West Virginia's water supply, Obama's Iraq policy comes under fire, a company provides retroactive advertising, and David Fanning talks Frontline.
1,293	TBA	Deborah Solomon	TBA	January 14	9201
A-Rod is suspended for drug use, Pat Buchanan supports Russia's anti-gay laws, Billie Jean King is a U.S. Olympic delegate, and Deborah Solomon talks American Mirror.
1,294	TBA	Gabriel Sherman	TBA	January 15	9202
America gets its own commercial, college athletes struggle with literacy, a sex scandal rocks France, and Gabriel Sherman talks The Loudest Voice In The Room.
1,295	TBA	Naquasia LeGrand	TBA	January 16	9203
The NSA infects personal computers, a jewelry company sells diamond pacifiers, Carol Burnett gets sarcastic, and Naquasia LeGrand talks "Fast Food Forward."
1,296	"Thrift Justice"	Scott Stossel	Kraft has recalled over 1.7 million pounds of Velveeta products for mislabeled ingredients. They accidentally called it cheese.	January 20	9204
Peyton Manning chants for Omaha, a drug shortage threatens the death penalty, Pope Francis encourages breastfeeding in church, and Scott Stossel talks My Age of Anxiety.
1,297	TBA	Michael Chabon & Mariel Hemingway	TBA	January 21	9205
cOlbert's Book Club begins with a primer on Ernest Hemingway, Michael Chabon talks A Farewell To Arms, and Mariel Hemingway discusses her grandfather's romantic side.
1,298	TBA	Charles Duhigg	The recent blizzard cracked a giant glass panel at New York's Apple Store. They can get it fixed for free if they don't tell Apple it got wet.	January 22	9206
NASA discovers a Martian doughnut, U.S. nuclear officers cheat on proficiency tests, the Westminster Dog Show allows mutts, and Charles Duhigg talks The Power of Habit.
1,299	TBA	Patricia Churchland	TBA	January 23	9207
Riots break out in Kyiv, Tim Wu weighs in on net neutrality, China bootlegs The Report, and Patricia Churchland discusses Touching A Nerve.
1,300	TBA	Nate Silver	TBA	January 27	9208
The NFL prohibits mention of the Super Bowl, Richard Sherman unleashes a post-game rant, the Grammys embrace gay marriage, and FiveThirtyEight's Nate Silver discusses sports.
1,301	TBA	Justin Tuck	TBA	January 28	9209
The NFL cracks down on extra points, Stephen trains to be a quarterback, spotted owls fight for survival, and Justin Tuck describes the thrill of football.
1,302	TBA	Cris Carter	TBA	January 29	9210
Stephen trains for Super Bowl greatness, the Puppy Bowl gets a new player, Joe Biden distracts at the State of the Union, and Cris Carter discusses football and Going Deep.
1,303	TBA	Drew Brees	TBA	January 30	9211
The NFL rethinks their marijuana policy, football might cause brain damage, the mayors of Denver and Seattle root for their home team, and Drew Brees talks "Playoff Face Off."

== February ==
No.	"The Wørd"	Guest(s)	Introductory phrase	Original release date	Prod. code
1,304	TBA	Jennifer Senior	TBA	February 3	9212
Coca-Cola's Super Bowl ad sparks outrage, cheerleaders sue the Oakland Raiders, J.K. Rowling regrets pairing Hermione and Ron, and Jennifer Senior talks All Joy and No Fun.
1,305	TBA	Maria Alyokhina & Nadezhda Tolokonnikova of Pussy Riot	TBA	February 4	9213
Black History Month coincides with Children's Dental Health Month, Chris Christie's bridge scandal worsens, and Pussy Riot discusses human rights and the Putin regime.
1,306	TBA	Lake Street Dive	New York City is running low on road salt, no wonder my commute was so bland.	February 5	9214
Critics argue that Obamacare will destroy jobs, Mort Zuckerman weighs in on Tom Perkins' Nazi analogy, and Lake Street Dive performs a song from Bad Self Portraits.
1,307	TBA	Paul Krugman	TBA	February 6	9215
Obama faces pressure to approve the Keystone Pipeline, Olympic journalists share Sochi horror stories, TSA agents gawk at body scan images, and Paul Krugman talks Obamacare.
1,308	TBA	Patrick Kennedy	TBA	February 10	9216
The Sochi Olympics open with a technical glitch, Buddy Cole investigates Russia's anti-gay laws, the Taliban captures a spy dog, and Patrick Kennedy discusses Project SAM.
1,309	TBA	Charlie Crist	According to the Department of Agriculture, one in six men eat pizza every day. The other five eat yesterday's pizza.	February 11	9217
Stephen launches a fundraiser for the U.S. speed skating team, Buddy Cole helps athletes appear straight, Michael Sam comes out, and Charlie Crist discusses The Party's Over.
1,310	TBA	Godfrey Reggio	TBA	February 12	9218
Stephen attends the White House State Dinner, Bill O'Reilly gloats over his Obama interview, Shepard Smith recites the White House menu, and Godfrey Reggio talks Visitors.
1,311	TBA	Brian Greene	Employers in Spain are getting rid of daytime naps. Meanwhile, employers in America are getting rid of nighttime sleep.	February 18	9219
Stephen welcomes Jimmy Fallon to The Tonight Show, Piers Morgan offends the trans community, Janet Mock explores gender identity, and Brian Greene discusses World Science U.
1,312	TBA	Alexander Payne	Georgia is offering a license plate featuring The Confederate Flag. Well I certainly hope State Troopers don't use it to racially profile white people.	February 19	9220
U.S. ice dancers nab a gold medal, Buddy Cole investigates gay propaganda in Sochi, Al-Qaeda members accidentally kill themselves, and Alexander Payne talks "Nebraska."
1,313	TBA	Stanley McChrystal	TBA	February 20	9221
Bill O'Reilly accuses Stephen of mockery, Bode Miller discusses his Olympic win, Buddy Cole goes undercover in Sochi, and Stanley McChrystal talks "My Share of the Task."
1,314	TBA	Darlene Love	Major League Baseball is eliminating Home Plate collisions. Apparently they violate baseball's long standing ban on action.	February 24	9222
A Dutch Olympics coach slams the U.S. speedskating team, protesters oust the Ukrainian president, and Darlene Love talks 20 Feet From Stardom.
1,315	"Jobsolete"	St. Vincent	TBA	February 25	9223
Huffington Post asks parents if their kid is Hitler, critics fume over military budget cuts, a lobby fights for paper, and St. Vincent performs "Digital Witness."
1,316	TBA	Meryl Davis & Charlie White	TBA	February 26	9224
Michelle Obama tackles child obesity, a Gumby thief terrorizes a small town, critics target Hillary Clinton's age, and Meryl Davis & Charlie White bask in Olympic glory.
1,317	TBA	Jeff Goldblum	The Oscar's are on Sunday! Damn! I had Tuesday in our office pool.	February 27	9225
Jan Brewer vetoes anti-gay legislation, a study suggests that race is subjective, the KKK embraces sci-fi technology, and Jeff Goldblum discusses "The Grand Budapest Hotel."

== March ==
No.	"The Wørd"	Guest(s)	Introductory phrase	Original release date	Prod. code
1,318	TBA	Caitlin Flanagan	TBA	March 3	9226
Slavery makes history at the Oscars, an anti-Obamacare ad spreads falsehoods, Barbie poses for Sports Illustrated, and Caitlin Flanagan talks "The Dark Power of Fraternities".
1,319	TBA	Jaron Lanier	Singapore is now the world's most expensive place to live. For the world's cheapest place, check your clothing label.	March 4	9227
Stephen gives a primer on Crimea, Republicans blame Obama for the Ukraine crisis, Steve King defends Arizona's anti-gay bill, and Jaron Lanier talks "Who Owns the Future?"
1,320	TBA	Beau Willimon	Vladimir Putin has been nominated for a Nobel Peace Prize. Nice try Norway, he's still going to invade.	March 5	9228
Bill O'Reilly cites the "downside" of woman presidents, Chevron delivers pizza, Headline News targets the social media generation, and Beau Willimon talks "House of Cards".
1,321	TBA	Theaster Gates	Staples is closing 225 stores, great, now where will I not find the ink cartridges that I need.	March 6	9229
Massachusetts allows upskirt photography, teens pursue the "thigh gap", Warner Music holds "Happy Birthday" hostage, and Theaster Gates uses art to revitalize urban spaces.
1,322	"Pew! Pew! Pew!"	Neil deGrasse Tyson	Daylight Savings Time started this weekend and I finally won the four month battle with my oven clock.	March 10	9230
Atheists protest a cross displayed at the 9/11 memorial, a Kentucky church group hosts a gun giveaway, and Neil deGrasse Tyson discusses his Fox series, "Cosmos".
1,323	TBA	Ronan Farrow	The E.U. wants to ban American cheese makers from using the name "Parmesan". Fine, then they can't use the name "Whiz".	March 11	9231
The Pope gets his own magazine, the Huffington Post investigates anal sex, the government sues Sprint over wiretapping fees, and Ronan Farrow discusses "Ronan Farrow Daily".
1,324	TBA	Maria Shriver	TBA	March 12	9232
Obama appears on Between Two Ferns, Liz Wahl discusses her resignation from Russia Today, the NSA hires an advice columnist, and Maria Shriver talks "Paycheck to Paycheck".
1,325	TBA	Simon Schama	TBA	March 13	9233
Recreational marijuana sales skyrocket in Colorado, Obama expands overtime pay for millions of Americans, and Simon Schama talks The Story of the Jews.
1,326	TBA	Bryan Cranston	TBA	March 24	9234
G. K. Butterfield gives a primer on North Carolina, cable news pundits embrace wild theories about Malaysia's missing plane, and Bryan Cranston discusses All The Way.
1,327	TBA	Jimmy Carter	TBA	March 25	9235
Former president Jimmy Carter visits The Report to discuss his lifelong passion for human rights and his book A Call to Action.
1,328	TBA	Errol Morris	TBA	March 26	9236
Secret Service agents go on a bender, a Belgian baby gets a soccer contract, the Washington Redskins reach out to Native Americans, and Errol Morris talks "The Unknown Known".
1,329	TBA	Darren Aronofsky	Idaho has raised its speed limit to 80 MPH. Now we can get out of there even faster.	March 27	9237
Russia seizes Ukraine's dolphin army, morning news shows pander to millennials, Hawaii's cops lose the right to have sex with prostitutes, and Darren Aronofsky talks Noah.
1,330	TBA	Biz Stone	TBA	March 31	9238
Apple announces ethnically diverse emoticons, Stephen responds to the #CancelColbert Twitter fiasco, and Biz Stone discusses his Jelly app and "Things A Little Bird Told Me".

== April ==
No.	"The Wørd"	Guest(s)	Introductory phrase	Original release date	Prod. code
1,331	TBA	John Malkovich	TBA	April 1	9239
Obamacare enrollment hits a major milestone, college athletes seek union rights, and John Malkovich chats about his movie Cesar Chavez.
1,332	"Silent But Deadly"	Dan Harris	TBA	April 2	9240
A U.N. report warns of devastating climate change, Tennessee seeks new death penalty drugs, aging tech workers resort to plastic surgery, and Dan Harris talks 10% Happier.
1,333	TBA	Mark Mazzetti	TBA	April 3	9241
Experts claim to have found the Holy Grail, Emily Bazelon weighs in on money in politics, Bill O'Reilly embraces inequality, and Mark Mazzetti talks The Way of The Knife.
1,334	TBA	Edward Frenkel	TBA	April 7	9242
Jeb Bush defends illegal immigrants, Alaska outlaws drone-assisted hunting, a GOP candidate speaks at a cockfighting rally, and Edward Frenkel talks Love And Math.
1,335	TBA	Jane Goodall	Newly released FBI documents allege that Al Sharpton was a mob informant. He must have joined MSNBC as part of the witness protection program.	April 8	9243
A Senate report reveals that the CIA made false claims about enhanced interrogation, Common Core math tests create mass confusion, and Jane Goodall talks Seeds of Hope.
1,336	TBA	Sheryl Sandberg	Hillary Clinton announced that she may run for President. I have not been this shocked since Mitt Romney announced he ran for President.	April 9	9244
An Internet bug causes panic, Andrew Sullivan weighs in on Brendan Eich's resignation from Mozilla, Obama pushes for equal pay, and Sheryl Sandberg talks Lean In.
1,337	TBA	Sting	TBA	April 10	9245
David Letterman announces his retirement, Botox helps treat depression, Bill O'Reilly fights the grievance-industrial complex, and Sting performs The Last Ship.
1,338	TBA	Ken Burns	Oscar Mayer is recalling ninety-six thousand pounds of hot dogs for containing cheese. Uggg... A hot dog being made with an identifiable food? Gross!	April 21	9246
An Al Qaeda video tips off U.S. forces, critics advance conspiracy theories about Hillary Clinton, a church embraces mixed martial arts, and Ken Burns talks The Address (see Gettysburg Address)
1,339	TBA	George Will	The Vatican Library is digitizing its archives. So that the next Dan Brown novel will just be Robert Langdon alone with an iPad.	April 22	9247
The U.S. Postal Service honors gay activist Harvey Milk, Stephen examines California's 29th district, and George Will talks A Nice Little Place On The North Side.
1,340	TBA	John Calipari	Market analysts say that iPad fever is cooling, meanwhile Kindle dysentery still runs rampant.	April 23	9248
Canada's middle class surges past that of the United States', college athletes get unlimited snacks, a senator defends cockfighting, America faces a lime shortage due to disease, and John Calipari talks "Players First".
1,341	TBA	George Saunders	TBA	April 24	9249
The Supreme Court upholds a ban on affirmative action, a cattle rancher battles the federal government, and author George Saunders discusses Congratulations, By The Way.
1,342	TBA	Michael McFaul	TBA	April 28	9250
Pope Francis grants sainthood to his predecessors, Paul Offit makes the case for vaccination, and Michael McFaul expands on Russia's complicated relationship with the U.S.
1,343	TBA	Robert Rodriguez	There's a critical security flaw in Internet Explorer, which is terrible news for anyone living in 1995.	April 29	9251
Donald Sterling lands in hot water over his racist remarks, Congress names a mountain after Reagan, Obama pushes for prisoner clemency, and Robert Rodriguez talks El Rey.
1,344	TBA	Audra McDonald	A new project will give each MIT undergrad student 100 dollars' worth of Bitcoin... wait 60 dollars' worth of bit coin... no, wait 800 dollars' worth of bit coin.	April 30	9252
Syria's president runs for reelection, Clay Aiken discusses his bid for Congress, a lesbian trio gets married, and Audra McDonald talks Lady Day At Emerson's Bar & Grill.

== May ==
No.	"The Wørd"	Guest(s)	Introductory phrase	Original release date	Prod. code
1,345	TBA	Saul Williams	TBA	May 1	9253
Jesse Watters mocks America's youth, CNN waits endlessly for news on Flight 370, and poet and musician Saul Williams talks about his role in Broadway's Holler If Ya Hear Me.
1,346	TBA	Edward O. Wilson	Sony has developed a 185 terabyte cassette. Finally, your mix tape can include two Phish songs.	May 5	9254
Stephen examines Virginia's 3rd District, Kareem Abdul-Jabbar weighs in on racism in America, and renowned biologist Edward O. Wilson talks A Window On Eternity.
1,347	TBA	Bette Midler	Skidmore College is offering a course on Miley Cyrus. It's not that easy. There's a lot of hometwerk. (Gives high-five to hand from under desk.)	May 6	9255
Rand Paul courts Rupert Murdoch at the Kentucky Derby, Georgia allows guns in public, Satanists build a statue in Oklahoma, and Bette Midler talks A View From A Broad.
1,348	TBA	David Remnick	17% of Americans say they'd have sex with a robot. The other 83% are liars.	May 7	9256
A vibrating pill fights constipation, scientists discover the world's first female penis, violence escalates in Ukraine, and The New Yorker's David Remnick talks The 40s.
1,349	TBA	Elliot Page	TBA	May 8	9257
Stephen interviews a vampire running for Congress, Fox Business anchor Stu Varney gushes about his popular appeal, and Elliot Page talks X-Men: Days of Future Past.
1,350	TBA	Glenn Greenwald	TBA	May 12	9258
Michael Sam becomes the NFL's first openly gay draft pick, conspiracy theories swirl around Monica Lewinsky's Vanity Fair essay, and Glenn Greenwald talks No Place To Hide.
1,351	TBA	The Black Keys	TBA	May 13	9259
Pope Francis embraces socialism, Rosemary Nyirumbe talks #BringBackOurGirls, the Koch brothers target the Columbus Zoo, and The Black Keys perform a song from Turn Blue.
1,352	"F**k It"	Keri Russell	The CDC says half of Americans take prescription drugs. The other half are too drunk to open the child proof cap.	May 14	9260
The pope declares that he would baptize Martians, climate change (global warming) reaches the point of no return, Amazon secures a questionable patent, and Keri Russell talks The Americans.
1,353	TBA	Thomas Friedman	TBA	May 15	9261
Russia kicks the U.S. out of the International Space Station, robots get lessons in morality, and Thomas Friedman talks Years of Living Dangerously.
1,354	TBA	Elizabeth Warren	A man in Tennessee was arrested for attempting to have sex with an ATM. Even worse, he had to pay a penalty for early withdrawal.	May 19	9262
Scientists embrace gender equality for lab rats, a product revolutionizes beef jerky, and Elizabeth Warren discusses the financial industry and her memoir, A Fighting Chance.
1,355	TBA	Matthew Weiner	TBA	May 20	9263
The U.S. accuses China of cyber spying, Republicans take ferocious aim at Hillary Clinton, the E.U. offers people a clean slate on Google, and Matthew Weiner talks "Mad Men."
1,356	TBA	Patrick Stewart	TBA	May 21	9264
Eccentric candidates dominate Idaho's gubernatorial debate, a Middle Eastern virus migrates to the U.S., and Patrick Stewart chats about X-Men: Days of Future Past.
1,357	TBA	Ray Mabus	The restaurant industry says that fast food workers could soon be replaced by robots. Unfortunately, even robots can't live on minimum wage.	May 22	9265
Paul Rieckhoff weighs in on a growing Veterans Affairs scandal, Marco Rubio dodges a question about his marijuana use, and Ray Mabus sheds light on the U.S. Navy.

== June ==
No.	"The Wørd"	Guest(s)	Introductory phrase	Original release date	Prod. code
1,358	TBA	Thomas Piketty	TBA	June 2	9266
Obama negotiates a prisoner swap with the Taliban, a Florida man installs a firing range in his yard, and Thomas Piketty discusses Capital in the Twenty-First Century.
1,359	TBA	Morgan Freeman	This week marks the 25th Anniversary of Tiananmen Square. Or as they call it in China, Tank Man Happy Day.	June 3	9267
Open-carry gun advocates make the NRA uncomfortable, Dan Esty weighs in on Obama's climate change initiative, and Morgan Freeman talks Through The Wormhole.
1,360	TBA	Jonah Hill	TBA	June 4	9268
Female hurricanes cause more deaths than male ones, Sherman Alexie discusses the Amazon-Hachette feud, The Report educates the public, and Jonah Hill talks 22 Jump Street.
1,361	TBA	Chrissie Hynde	A study found smoking marijuana can make men infertile. So remember, it you're going to have unprotected sex, get high first.	June 5	9269
Conservatives scrutinize Sgt. Bowe Bergdahl, North Korea invents a mushroom sports drink, football players sue the NFL, and Chrissie Hynde performs songs from Stockholm.
1,362	TBA	Esther Perel	TBA	June 9	9270
A GOP candidate changes his name in order to win Hispanic votes, Vincent van Gogh's ear finds new life at an art museum, and Esther Perel talks "Mating in Captivity."
1,363	TBA	John Waters	TBA	June 10	9271
A computer passes for a human being, a robot demands civil rights, the Jacksonville Jaguars install swimming pools in their stadium, and John Waters talks Carsick.
1,364	"Debt or Prison"	Rob Rhinehart	Police in Arizona arrested a man who was trying to shoot the moon with a handgun. What an idiot, you gotta wait until it's full.	June 11	9272
Tea Party challenger David Brat defeats Eric Cantor, debtors' prison makes a comeback in the U.S., and Rob Rhinehart discusses his food substitute Soylent.
1,365	TBA	James Webb	TBA	June 12	9273
Ted Cruz drops his Canadian citizenship, Led Zeppelin faces a plagiarism lawsuit, Hans Beinholtz discusses the World Cup, and James Webb talks I Heard My Country Calling.
1,366	TBA	Ta-Nehisi Coates	TBA	June 16	9274
Ben Van Heuvelen discusses the ISIS threat in Iraq, a study finds that financial hardship can lead to racist attitudes, and Ta-Nehisi Coates talks The Case for Reparations.
1,367	"A Darker Shade of Pale"	David Boies & Theodore B. Olson	TBA	June 17	9275
Team USA defeats Ghana at the World Cup, Hispanics prove that being white is a choice, and David Boies and Theodore B. Olson discuss Redeeming the Dream.
1,368	TBA	Katty Kay & Claire Shipman	Police in Fresno California busted a meth lab in a retirement community. They got suspicious when no one there had any teeth.	June 18	9276
The RNC sends a giant squirrel after Hillary Clinton, Thad Cochran reminisces about indecent acts with animals, and Katty Kay and Claire Shipman talk The Confidence Code.
1,369	TBA	Jay Carney	TBA	June 19	9277
Dick Cheney slams Obama over Iraq, Doritos unveils experimental flavors, an app reduces all messages to "yo," and Jay Carney chats about being White House press secretary.
1,370	TBA	John Green	TBA	June 23	9278
1,371	TBA	Edie Falco	A new study says casual sex may be good for you. Well... it was good for me...	June 24	9279
ISIS militants invade the Twittersphere, Ben & Jerry's becomes GMO-free, New York lawmakers ban tiger selfies, and Edie Falco talks about Showtime's Nurse Jackie.
1,372	TBA	Eleanor Holmes Norton	TBA	June 25	9280
Obama raises eyebrows at a Chipotle, John Burnett discusses America's child immigrant crisis, and Eleanor Holmes Norton reflects on Mississippi's Freedom Summer.
1,373	TBA	Paul Rudd	TBA	June 26	9281
Fox News's Keith Ablow floats a conspiracy theory about the World Cup, North Carolina upholds a possum-dropping tradition, and Paul Rudd chats about They Came Together.

== July ==
No.	"The Wørd"	Guest(s)	Introductory phrase	Original release date	Prod. code
1,374	TBA	Jad Abumrad & Robert Krulwich	My show was nominated for six Emmys and it had nothing to do with all my lesbian prison sex.	July 14	9282
The World Cup draws to an end, John Boehner sues Obama, a company invents a beverage-identifying cup, and Jad Abumrad and Robert Krulwich talk Radiolab.
1,375	TBA	Vint Cerf	TBA	July 15	9283
Obama develops a case of senioritis, bears continue to threaten America, and Google's Vint Cerf describes his role in co-creating the Internet.
1,376	TBA	Bill de Blasio	TBA	July 16	9284
Rick Perry faces criticism over his fashion choices, Joe Quesada discusses Captain America's replacement, and Bill de Blasio weighs in on the challenges facing New Yorkers.
1,377	TBA	Steven M. Wise	TBA	July 17	9285
A Malaysia Airlines plane crashes in Ukraine, conservatives react to the child immigrant crisis, coal rollers embrace pollution, and Steven M. Wise talks Rattling the Cage.
1,378	TBA	Nancy Pelosi	The world's second richest man says we should have a three-day work week. Now you know why he's only the second richest man.	July 21	9286
Tensions rise over the downing of Malaysia Airlines Flight 17, Edan Lepucki's "California" becomes a best seller, and Nancy Pelosi discusses the "Middle Class Jumpstart" plan.
1,379	TBA	Julia Ioffe	TBA	July 22	9287
Rep. Steve Pearce investigates the child immigrant problem, P.K. Winsome offers advice on impeaching Obama, and Julia Ioffe discusses the Russia-Ukraine conflict.
1,380	TBA	Mary Mazzio & Oscar Vazquez	TBA	July 23	9288
Tim Draper discusses his "Six Californias" initiative, Lowe's employees deliver top-notch health care for veterans, and Mary Mazzio and Oscar Vazquez talk "Underwater Dreams."
1,381	TBA	Elon Musk	TBA	July 24	9289
Darth Vader polls higher than all 2016 presidential candidates, True Blood slams conservatives, a typo threatens Obamacare, and Elon Musk shares his visionary technology.
1,382	"See No Equal"	Beck	TBA	July 28	9290
Stephen hosts The Hobbit panel at Comic-Con, a luxury apartment complex includes a "poor door", and Beck performs a song off his album Morning Phase.
1,383	TBA	Jon Batiste and Stay Human	TBA	July 29	9291
A week's worth of horrible news weighs on Stephen, Sarah Palin launches her own TV channel, and Jon Batiste and Stay Human perform a song off their album Social Music.
1,384	TBA	James Franco	TBA	July 30	9292
Orlando Bloom throws a punch at Justin Bieber, Allan Sloan discusses corporate tax dodgers, nudity becomes a big hit on reality TV, and James Franco talks Child of God.
1,385	TBA	Campbell Brown	TBA	July 31	9293
Obama supports putting women on U.S. currency, controversy swirls around coverage of the Gaza crisis, Satan sends text messages, and Campbell Brown talks education reform.

== August ==
No.	"The Wørd"	Guest(s)	Introductory phrase	Original release date	Prod. code
1,386	TBA	Pat Buchanan & John W. Dean	TBA	August 4	9294
Stephen commemorates the 40th anniversary of President Nixon's resignation, Pat Buchanan discusses The Greatest Comeback, and John Dean talks The Nixon Defense. The majority of this episode features Colbert dressed in 1970s apparel, while the picture is framed inside a graphic of a 1970s television set.
1,387	TBA	James Cameron	TBA	August 5	9295
Open-carry gun supporters publish a children's book, Hillary Clinton discusses Hard Choices, and James Cameron talks about DeepSea Challenge 3D.
1,388	TBA	Michael Fassbender	TBA	August 6	9296
Kim Jong-un tours a lube factory, Rand Paul runs away from immigration activists, a five-year-old gives a stellar TV interview, and Michael Fassbender chats about Frank.
1,389	TBA	Brian Chesky	Hawaii is facing back-to-back hurricanes. So just when they're saying aloha to one, they'll be saying aloha to another.	August 7	9297
The Ebola panic spreads across America, Vladimir Putin bans food from the West, Stephen takes sides in a sandwich showdown, and Brian Chesky chats about his company, Airbnb.
1,390	TBA	Jeff Bridges & Lois Lowry	TBA	August 26	9298
The Report wins the Emmy for Outstanding Variety Series, Stephen chats with Rep. Marcia Fudge about Ohio's 11th District, and Jeff Bridges and Lois Lowry talk "The Giver."
1,391	TBA	Michael Sheen	A new study says breakfast is no longer the most important meal of the day. It has fallen to eighth place.	August 27	9299
Protests erupt over the shooting of an unarmed black teenager, Scrabble adds thousands of trendy words to its dictionary, and Michael Sheen talks about Masters of Sex.
1,392	TBA	JR	TBA	August 28	9300
Critics blast Obama as ISIS advances in Syria, a company provides a convenient way to inhale alcohol, and JR shares his award-winning street art.

== September ==
No.	"The Wørd"	Guest(s)	Introductory phrase	Original release date	Prod. code
1,393	TBA	Mandy Patinkin	TBA	September 2	9301
Hackers post nude photos of female celebrities, Norm Stamper discusses the implications of militarizing the police, and Mandy Patinkin talks Homeland.
1,394	TBA	Randall Munroe	Former House Majority Leader Eric Cantor has taken a new job at a Wall Street investment bank. Now he can finally have some influence in Congress.	September 3	9302
Critics demand that Obama go to war with ISIS, Frank Underwood from House of Cards offers leadership advice, and Randall Munroe discusses his book What If?.
1,395	TBA	Doris Kearns Goodwin	Authorities in California are searching for a dangerous escaped albino cobra. Though to be safe, police have arrested seven black cobras.	September 4	9303
New York City's St. Patrick's Day Parade welcomes gays, Cosmopolitan covers the midterms, Al-Qaeda expands into India, and Doris Kearns Goodwin discusses "The Bully Pulpit."
1,396	TBA	John Lithgow	Olive Garden is introducing a $100, all-you-can-eat "Pasta Pass" that lasts seven weeks. Though technically the last two weeks are for your next of kin.	September 8	9304
Pundits rejoice over a royal pregnancy, immigration reform remains in limbo, a fitness bracelet shocks people into exercising, and John Lithgow discusses Love Is Strange.
1,397	TBA	Jason Segel	TBA	September 9	9305
Apple unveils its smartwatch, Detroit firefighters manage to innovate despite a lack of resources, and Jason Segel discusses his children's book, Nightmares!
1,398	TBA	Henry Kissinger	Researchers say there may be a male birth control shot by 2017, which will sit in your wallet until 2020.	September 10	9306
President Obama plans to destroy ISIS, Donald Trump tries to protect his name, the BuyPartisan app helps people shop politically, and Henry Kissinger discusses "World Order."
1,399	TBA	Lonn Taylor	TBA	September 11	9307
President Obama declares military action against ISIS, global warming threatens birds, and Lonn Taylor discusses "The Star-Spangled Banner: The Making of an American Icon."
1,400	TBA	Mindy Kaling	TBA	September 15	9308
A new Miss America is crowned, The Guardian editor Matt Wells weighs in on Scottish independence, think tanks accept foreign money, and Mindy Kaling talks The Mindy Project.
1,401	TBA	Unlocking the Truth	Ryan Gosling has welcomed his first born child into the world. Wait, what do you call a baby Gosling?	September 16	9309
President Obama gathers allies to battle ISIS, a detailed report insults the Olive Garden's menu, and teen metal band Unlocking the Truth performs their song Monster.
1,402	TBA	Viggo Mortensen	TBA	September 17	9310
Stephen dresses up as Prince Hawkcat at Comic-Con, California school districts receive armored military vehicles, and Viggo Mortensen chats about The Two Faces of January.
1,403	TBA	Terry Gilliam	TBA	September 18	9311
A new app helps people cut down on their smartphone usage, Sean Hannity reminisces about being spanked, and Terry Gilliam discusses his film The Zero Theorem.
1,404	TBA	Jeff Tweedy	TBA	September 22	9312
Afghan soldiers go missing from Cape Cod, climate change protesters descend on Manhattan, Charles Krauthammer psychoanalyzes Obama, and Jeff Tweedy performs a song from "Sukierae."
1,405	TBA	Naomi Klein	TBA	September 23	9313
The U.S. launches airstrikes in Syria, Jared Huffman chats about California's 2nd district, a Russian brewer acquires Pabst, and Naomi Klein talks "This Changes Everything."
1,406	TBA	Bill Cosby	TBA	September 24	9314
Jeff Tweedy calls the Atone Phone hotline, Obama comes under fire for saluting with a coffee cup, and Bill Cosby sits down with Stephen.
1,407	TBA	Walter Mischel	A New Mexico police officer claims to have seen a ghost on a surveillance camera, but he let it go because it was white.	September 25	9315
Attorney General Eric Holder resigns, Staten Island's famous groundhog dies under suspicious circumstances, and Walter Mischel discusses "The Marshmallow Test."
1,408	TBA	Jamie Oliver	TBA	September 29	11001
Pundits imply that Obama is mimicking George W. Bush, Hillary Clinton becomes a grandmother, Kim Jong-un battles a cheese addiction, and Jamie Oliver talks "Comfort Food."
1,409	TBA	Jeffrey Tambor	TBA	September 30	11002
A Muslim NFL player gets punished for praying, Bobby Jindal rethinks his pro-knowledge agenda, Hans Beinholtz accentuates the negative, and Jeffrey Tambor talks "Transparent."

== October ==
No.	"The Wørd"	Guest(s)	Introductory phrase	Original release date	Prod. code
1,410	TBA	Mike Mullen	TBA	October 1	11003
Author Louisa Lim discusses civil unrest in Hong Kong, Stephen offends Bill O'Reilly, and retired Admiral Mike Mullen talks about ISIS and the Middle East.
1,411	TBA	Lynn Sherr	Adam Sandler has signed a four movie deal with Netflix. Big deal, I get unlimited movies from them.	October 2	11004
Dr. Kent Sepkowitz discusses America's first Ebola case, rich Americans develop new ways to exclude others, and Lynn Sherr talks "Sally Ride: America's First Woman in Space."
1,412	TBA	James M. McPherson	Investigators found that ISIS has used ammunition from 21 different countries including China. Oh no, some of those bullets might contain lead.	October 6	11005
Gay marriage becomes legal in 30 states, Allison Orr Larsen discusses amicus briefs, the CDC attempts to quell Ebola fears, and James M. McPherson talks "Embattled Rebel."
1,413	TBA	Leon Wieseltier	TBA	October 7	11006
CNN compares Ebola to ISIS, Rep. Tammy Duckworth talks about Illinois's 8th district, and The New Republic's Leon Wieseltier discusses "Insurrections of the Mind."
1,414	TBA	Carol Burnett	The Neiman Marcus catalog is selling a custom perfume for $475,000. It's the perfect gift for anyone who wants to smell like an idiot.	October 8	11007
John Boehner raises money for an openly gay politician, Obama faces pressure to name the war against ISIS, and Carol Burnett talks about her role in "Love Letters."
1,415	TBA	Robert Plant	A new study says that on average men need 7.8 hours of sleep a day. Really? On top to the 12 hours I get each night?	October 9	11008
Seattle puts an end to Columbus Day, two toddlers argue about the weather, and Robert Plant performs songs from "Lullaby and... The Ceaseless Roar."
1,416	TBA	Walter Isaacson	Netscape Navigator launched 20 years ago today and it is just now finished loading.	October 13	11009
Michelle Obama flubs a candidate's name, South Dakota's Senate race heats up, Stephen prepares for his final 32 episodes, and Walter Isaacson discusses The Innovators.
1,417	TBA	Neil Young	TBA	October 14	11010
The Vatican promotes acceptance of gays, a Republican ad compares Governor Rick Scott to a wedding dress, and "Special Deluxe" author Neil Young performs a duet with Stephen.
1,418	TBA	Justin Simien	TBA	October 15	11011
Google botches Stephen's height, Stan Lee creates an Indian superhero, Sean Hannity shares his fitness secrets, and writer-director Justin Simien talks "Dear White People."
1,419	TBA	William Deresiewicz	TBA	October 16	11012
C.J. Chivers weighs in on abandoned WMDs found in Iraq, Rick Scott and Charlie Crist face off in an unusual debate, and author William Deresiewicz discusses "Excellent Sheep."
1,420	TBA	Meredith Vieira	TBA	October 27	11013
The Ebola virus arrives in New York City, Texas Rep. Louie Gohmert argues against gays in the military, and Meredith Vieira discusses "The Meredith Vieira Show."
1,421	TBA	Michael Lewis	TBA	October 28	11014
The government takes the fun out of Halloween, the NRA defeats a bill against pet eating, Gov. Tom Corbett gets caught using Photoshop, and Michael Lewis talks "Liar's Poker."
1,422	TBA	Jill Lepore	TBA	October 29	11015
Anita Sarkeesian discusses Gamergate, Kevin Vickers stops a shooting spree in Canada's parliament building, and Jill Lepore talks "The Secret History of Wonder Woman."
1,423	TBA	David Miliband	TBA	October 30	11016
Stephen unveils the paperback edition of "America Again", George Takei defends democracy, and David Miliband discusses the International Rescue Committee.

== November ==
No.	"The Wørd"	Guest(s)	Introductory phrase	Original release date	Prod. code
1,424	TBA	Chuck Todd	Hello Kitty turns 40 today. Now she's as old as the men who love her.	November 3	11017
Voters receive shame-inducing flyers, Hitler's face appears on Swiss coffee creamers, Disney offers animated cakes, and Chuck Todd talks "Meet the Press" and "The Stranger."
1,425	TBA	Andrew Sullivan	TBA	November 4	11018
Stephen provides live coverage of the midterms, cable news pundits flaunt high-tech gadgets, and "The Dish" blogger Andrew Sullivan weighs in on the election results.
1,426	TBA	Kirsten Gillibrand	A New York doctor infected with Ebola is reportedly now well enough to play the banjo. People quickly stopped wishing him a speedy recovery.	November 5	11019
Rep. Barbara Lee talks about California's 13th district, voters legalize marijuana in Washington, D.C., and Sen. Kirsten Gillibrand discusses "Off the Sidelines."
1,427	TBA	Steven Johnson	The upcoming Star Wars movie is titled The Force Awakens. It fell asleep during The Phantom menace.	November 6	11020
Police arrest an elderly man for feeding the homeless, conservative leaders embrace their lack of scientific knowledge, and Steven Johnson talks "How We Got to Now."
1,428	"It's a Trap!"	Andy Cohen	A scientist in Germany has discovered a way to make diamonds from peanut butter. So fellas, you can now propose with a jar of JIF.	November 10	11021
North Korea releases two American prisoners, Rush Limbaugh warns the GOP against governing, snack technology leaps forward, and Andy Cohen discusses "The Andy Cohen Diaries."
1,429	TBA	Diane von Furstenberg	TBA	November 11	11022
The U.S. targets the leader of ISIS, President Obama faces criticism after visiting China, and Diane von Furstenberg chats about "The Woman I Wanted to Be."
1,430	TBA	Terence Tao	Kobe Bryant has set the NBA's all time record for missed shots. But remember Kobe, you always make 100% of the shots you don't miss.	November 12	11023
A drone is used to film people having sex, a Colorado lawmaker claims that President Obama is possessed by demons, and Terence Tao discusses his passion for math.
1,431	TBA	Jennifer Lawrence	TBA	November 13	11024
Emily Bazelon discusses a Supreme Court challenge to Obamacare, gay marriage spreads to South Carolina, and Jennifer Lawrence talks The Hunger Games: Mockingjay - Part 1.
1,432	TBA	Bernie Sanders	TBA	November 17	11025
U2's Bono loses his luggage in midair, Good Morning America offers sensational survival tips, and Senator Bernie Sanders discusses health care and his plans for 2016.
1,433	TBA	Eva Longoria	Jose Canseco is selling his amputated finger on eBay, because thanks to steroids he's already grown a new one back.	November 18	11026
Freezing temperatures grip the nation, Esteban Colberto talks immigration reform, salvage stores sell expired food to the poor, and Eva Longoria discusses "Food Chains."
1,434	TBA	Toni Morrison	TBA	November 19	11027
A police drill causes panic at a Florida school, activists in New Hampshire target meter maids, Black Friday gets an early start, and Toni Morrison discusses her writing.
1,435	TBA	Jon Stewart	TBA	November 20	11028
President Obama's amnesty plan outrages Republicans, the world's chocolate supply drops to catastrophic levels, and Jon Stewart discusses his movie "Rosewater."

== December ==
No.	"The Wørd"	Guest(s)	Introductory phrase	Original release date	Prod. code
1,436	TBA	John McCain	Researchers are developing a breathalyzer that detects marijuana, the best part is, you can turn it into a bong.	December 1	11029
"Star Wars" fans react to a new lightsaber design, members of the St. Louis Rams protest the Ferguson decision, and Senator John McCain discusses his book Thirteen Soldiers.
1,437	"Crook and Ladder"	Tony Bennett & Lady Gaga	A Major League umpire has revealed that he is gay, or as he put it: "I'm out!"	December 2	11030
Stephen announces an upcoming special in Washington, D.C., T.G.I. Friday's deploys mistletoe drones, and Tony Bennett and Lady Gaga talk about their album, "Cheek to Cheek."
1,438	TBA	Christopher Nolan	After 40 years, Burger King has brought back the Yumbo sandwich, don't worry, some of them are new.	December 3	11031
Congress bans Social Security benefits for Nazis, Pizza Hut introduces a mind-reading menu, Amy Sedaris pays a surprise visit, and Christopher Nolan talks Interstellar.
1,439	TBA	Paul Farmer	TBA	December 4	11032
Stephen lands an interview with President Obama, a grand jury decision sparks outrage, a soap opera producer becomes an ambassador, and Paul Farmer talks Partners In Health.
1,440	"To Health in a Handbasket"	President Barack Obama	TBA	December 8	11033
Stephen hosts the show from George Washington University in Washington, D.C. President Barack Obama takes over "The Wørd" segment, which he re-brands as "The De¢ree".
1,441	TBA	James Corden	TBA	December 9	11034
Stephen addresses Discovery Channel's Eaten Alive disappointing outcome, representative Jack Kingston features in the last installment of "Better Know a District" and James Corden talks Into the Woods and The Late Late Show with James Corden.
1,442	TBA	Sarah Koenig	TBA	December 10	11035
Pundits react to a scathing Senate report on torture, Tom Blanton discusses deceit at the CIA, and Sarah Koenig talks about her investigative podcast, Serial.
1,443	TBA	Smaug	TBA	December 11	11036
Gov. Scott Walker botches a Jewish phrase, Ridley Scott casts white actors to play Egyptians, Stephen raffles off set pieces from The Report, and Smaug discusses The Hobbit.
1,444	TBA	Seth Rogen	A New York high schooler made $72 million trading stocks on his lunch hour. In a couple more years, he might have enough to pay for college.	December 15	11037
Michele Bachmann shares her holiday wish with President Barack Obama, Stephen argues with himself about torture, recent hacker attack on Sony is analyzed and Seth Rogen talks The Interview.
1,445	TBA	Kendrick Lamar	TBA	December 16	11038
Jeb Bush eyes a presidential run, Jason Bordoff discusses OPEC's oil price war, Stephen lets a sponsor rebrand The Report, and Kendrick Lamar debuts an untitled track.
1,446	TBA	Phil Klay	NASA has found methane on Mars, though I believe it originated from Uranus.	December 17	11039
The Report set moves to cyberspace, Stephen hosts a yard sale to clear out the studio, lifting of United States' embargo against Cuba is discussed and author Phil Klay talks Redeployment.
1,447	"Same to You, Pal"	"Grimmy"	TBA	December 18	11040
Stephen becomes immortal after accidentally killing "Grimmy" during the opening of the segment of "Cheating Death with Dr. Stephen T. Colbert, D.F.A.". This leads to Stephen singing "We'll Meet Again" in its entirety along with a large crowd of several recognizable figures, before meeting with Santa Clause on the roof of the studio.
