= Reed Albergotti =

American journalist

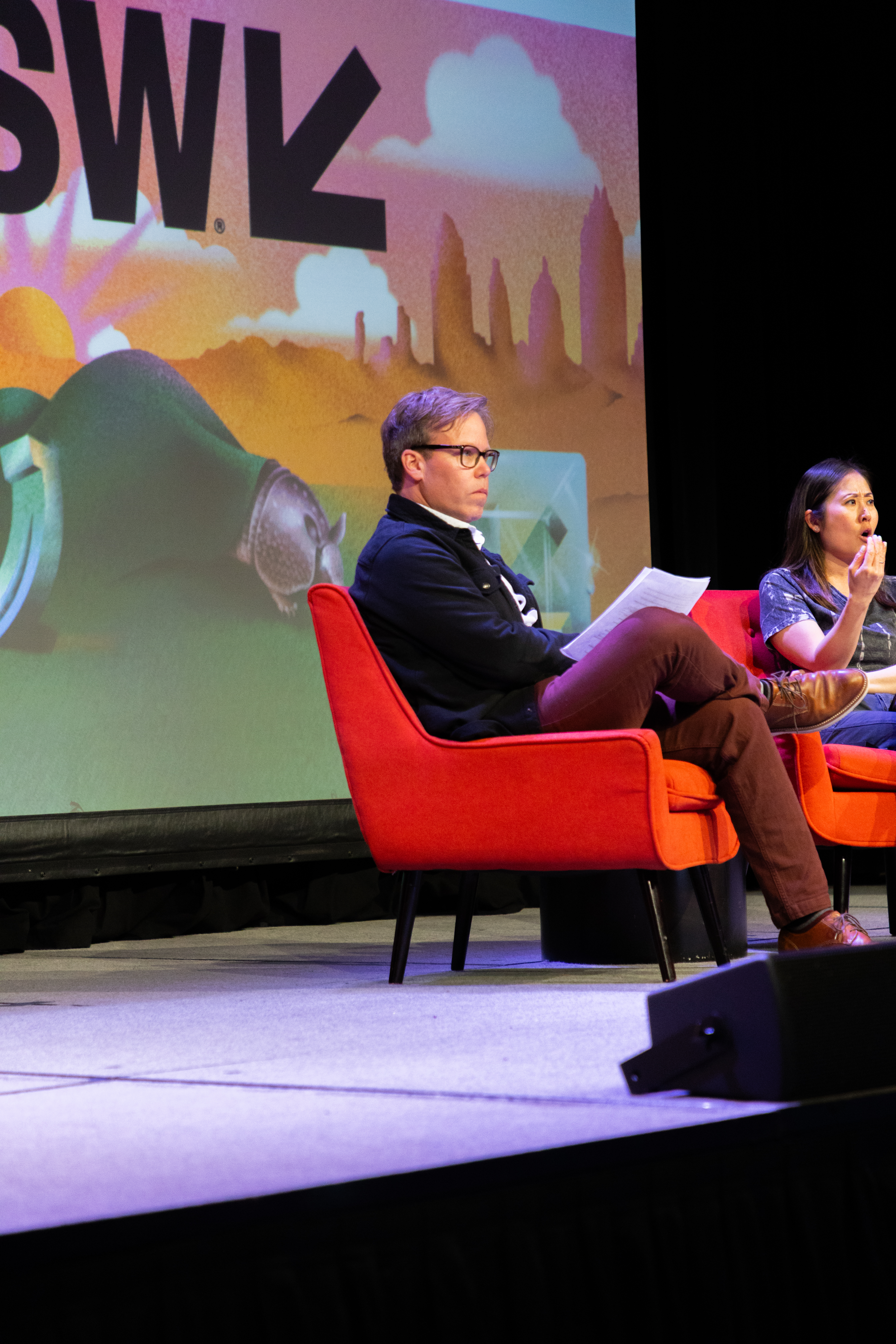
- Courtesy of The Wall Street Journal
- Born: Reed Albergotti
- Status: Married
- Education: San Diego State University
- Occupations: Journalist, author
- Notable credit(s): The Wall Street Journal; Wheelmen

Reed Albergotti (born in Minneapolis) is an American journalist and the co-author of Wheelmen: Lance Armstrong, the Tour de France, and the Greatest Sports Conspiracy Ever. This non-fiction book co-written with Vanessa O'Connell was published by Gotham Books on October 15, 2013. He has written about law and sports, including the doping scandal in American cycling.

In 2008, Albergotti was one of a small group of journalists who helped found The Wall Street Journal's sports page.

In 2010, Albergotti created the ongoing Wall Street Journal video series called The Olympics: How Hard Can it Be? In the series, Albergotti tried out Olympic sports including hockey and figure skating with American athletes like hockey goalie Martin Brodeur and gold medal-winning figure skater Sarah Hughes.
