= Wheelmen =

2013 book by Reed Albergotti and Vanessa O'Connell

- Author: Reed Albergotti; Vanessa O'Connell
- Language: English
- Genre: Non-fiction
- Publisher: Gotham Books
- Publication date: October 15, 2013
- Publication place: United States
- Media type: Hardcover
- Pages: 384
- ISBN: 978-1-59240-848-1

Wheelmen: Lance Armstrong, the Tour de France, and the Greatest Sports Conspiracy Ever is a non-fiction book about American cycling and Lance Armstrong, as well as his teammates, including Floyd Landis. The book was released in the United States and Canada by Gotham Books on October 15, 2013, and in the United Kingdom by Headline Publishing. Wheelmen was co-authored by American journalists Reed Albergotti and Vanessa O'Connell who worked for The Wall Street Journal. The Wall Street Journal ran a pre-release excerpt of the book on October 7, 2013, with the headline "Lance Armstrong: The Downfall of a Champion".

In its review of Wheelmen, The Economist described it as "a level-headed view of the culture and business of cycling".
