= Andrew Bacevich =

American military historian (born 1947)

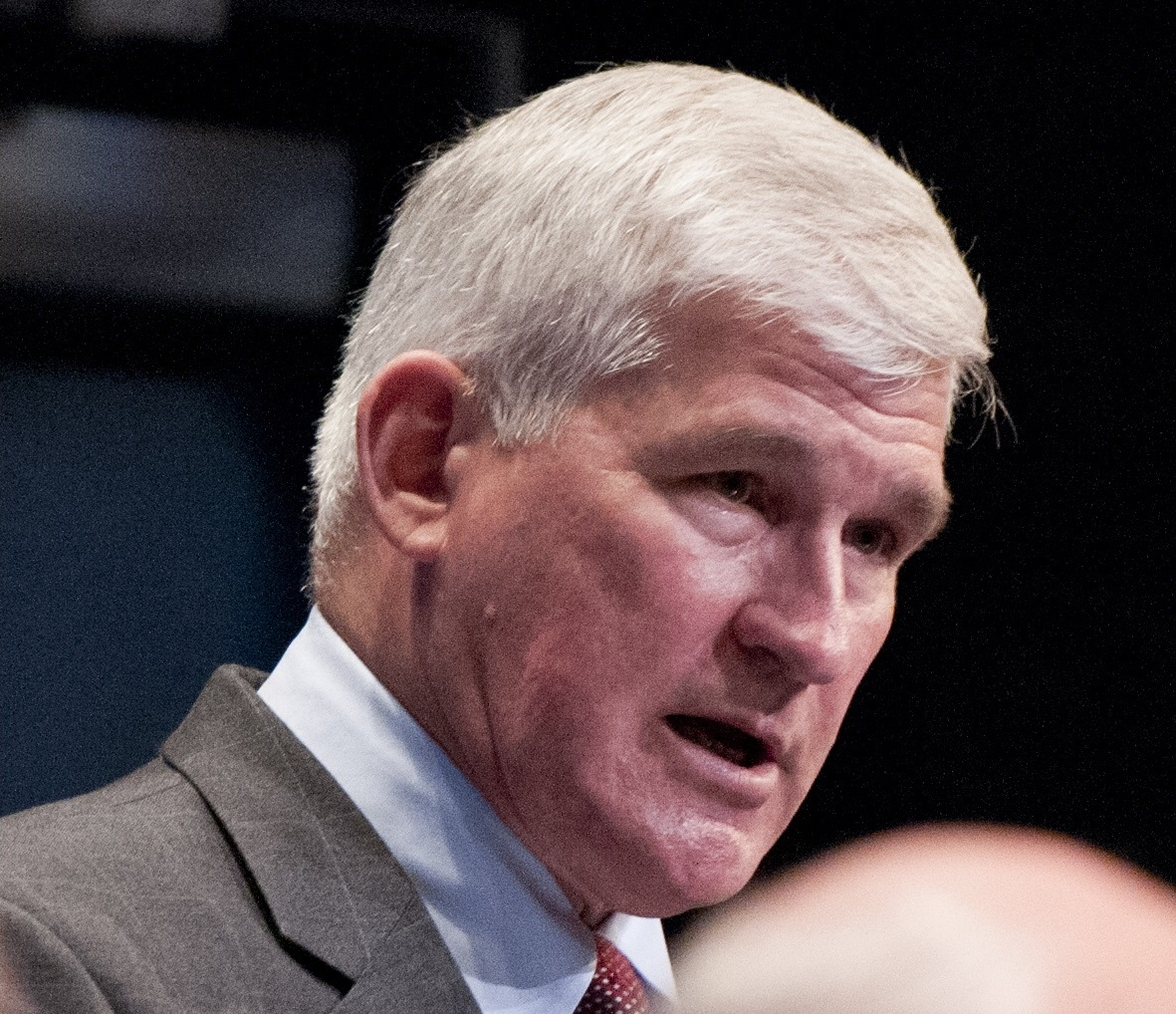
- Bacevich in 2012
- Born: Andrew Joseph Bacevich Jr. July 5, 1947 (age 79); Normal, Illinois, U.S.
- Education: United States Military Academy (BS); Princeton University (MA, PhD)
- Occupations: Historian, writer, professor; Colonel, U.S. Army (retired)
- Employer: Boston University
- Known for: Analysis of U.S. foreign policy
- Spouse: Nancy
- Children: 4
- Military career
- Allegiance: United States
- Branch: United States Army
- Service years: 1969–1992
- Rank: Colonel
- Conflicts: Vietnam War; Gulf War

Andrew J. Bacevich Jr. (/ˈbeɪsəvɪtʃ/, BAY-sə-vitch; born 5 July 1947) is an American historian specializing in international relations, security studies, American foreign policy, and American diplomatic and military history. He is professor emeritus of international relations and history at the Boston University Frederick S. Pardee School of Global Studies.

He is a retired career officer in the Armor Branch of the United States Army, retiring in the rank of colonel. He is former director of Boston University's Center for International Relations (from 1998 to 2005), now part of the Pardee School of Global Studies. Bacevich is cofounder and president of the Quincy Institute for Responsible Statecraft.

He has been "a persistent, vocal critic of the U.S. occupation of Iraq, calling the conflict a catastrophic failure." In March 2007, he described George W. Bush's endorsement of such "preventive wars" as "immoral, illicit, and imprudent." His son, Andrew John Bacevich, also an Army officer, died fighting in the Iraq War in May 2007.

In July 2024, he signed an open letter against inviting Ukraine into NATO.

In 2016, Bacevich argued that U.S. militarization of the Greater Middle East dated to the Carter administration, arguing that the stated U.S. goals of intervention masked a broader objective of demonstrating American exceptionalism through military dominance.

== Early life and education ==
Bacevich was born in Normal, Illinois, the son of Martha Ellen (née Bulfer; later Greenis) and Andrew Bacevich Sr. His father was of Lithuanian descent, and his mother was of Irish, German, and English ancestry. Bacevich described himself as a "Catholic conservative."

He graduated from the United States Military Academy in 1969 and served in the United States Army during the Vietnam War, serving in Vietnam from the summer of 1970 to the summer of 1971.

Later he held posts in Germany, including in the 11th Armored Cavalry Regiment; the United States; and the Persian Gulf up to his retirement from the service with the rank of colonel in the early 1990s. His early retirement is thought to be the result of him taking responsibility for the Camp Doha (Kuwait) explosion in 1991 in command of the 11th Armored Cavalry Regiment. He holds a Ph.D. in American Diplomatic History from Princeton University, where his 1982 doctoral thesis was entitled American military diplomacy, 1898–1949: the role of Frank Ross McCoy. Bacevich taught at West Point and Johns Hopkins University before joining the faculty at Boston University in 1998.

== Writings ==
Bacevich initially published writings in a number of politically oriented magazines, including The Wilson Quarterly. He advocates for a non-interventionist foreign policy. His writings have professed a dissatisfaction with the Bush administration and many of its intellectual supporters on matters of U.S. foreign policy.

On August 15, 2008, Bacevich appeared as the guest of Bill Moyers Journal on PBS to promote his book, The Limits of Power. As in both of his previous books, The Long War (2007) and The New American Militarism: How Americans are Seduced by War (2005), Bacevich is critical of U.S. foreign policy in the post-Cold War era, maintaining the United States has developed an over-reliance on military power, in contrast to diplomacy, to achieve its foreign policy aims. He also asserts that policymakers in particular, and the U.S. people in general, overestimate the usefulness of military force in foreign affairs. Bacevich believes romanticized images of war in popular culture (especially films) interact with the lack of actual military service among most of the U.S. population to produce in the U.S. people a highly unrealistic, even dangerous notion of what combat and military service are really like.

Bacevich conceived The New American Militarism as "a corrective to what has become the conventional critique of U.S. policies since 9/11 but [also] as a challenge to the orthodox historical context employed to justify those policies." Finally, he attempts to place current policies in historical context, as part of a U.S. tradition going back to the Presidency of Woodrow Wilson, a tradition (of an interventionist, militarized foreign policy) which has strong bi-partisan roots. To lay an intellectual foundation for this argument, he cites two influential historians from the 20th century: Charles A. Beard and William Appleman Williams. Ultimately, Bacevich eschews the partisanship of current debate about U.S. foreign policy as short-sighted and ahistorical. Instead of blaming only one president (or his advisors) for contemporary policies, Bacevich sees both Republicans and Democrats as sharing responsibility for policies which may not be in the nation's best interest.

In March 2003, at the time of the U.S. invasion of Iraq, Bacevich wrote in the Los Angeles Times that "if, as seems probable, the effort encounters greater resistance than its architects imagine, our way of life may find itself tested in ways that will make the Vietnam War look like a mere blip in American history."

Bacevich's book American Empire: The Realities and Consequences of US Diplomacy, published in 2004, was highly praised by Professor of International Relations and author Peter Gowan for being "a tonic to read: crisp, vivid, pungent, with a dry sense of humour and sharp sense of hypocrisies." Gowan describes Bacevich as a "conservative, who explains that he believed in the justice of America's war against Communism, and continues to do so, but once it was over came to the conclusion that U.S. expansionism both preceded and exceeded the logic of the Cold War, and needed to be understood in a longer, more continuous historical durée."

Bacevich wrote an editorial about the Bush Doctrine published in The Boston Globe in March 2007.

In an article of The American Conservative dated March 24, 2008, Bacevich depicts Democratic presidential candidate Barack Obama as the best choice for conservatives in the fall. Part of his argument includes the fact that "this liberal Democrat has promised to end the U.S. combat role in Iraq. Contained within that promise, if fulfilled, lies some modest prospect of a conservative revival." He also goes on to mention that "For conservatives to hope the election of yet another Republican will set things right is surely in vain. To believe that President John McCain will reduce the scope and intrusiveness of federal authority, cut the imperial presidency down to size, and put the government on a pay-as-you-go basis is to succumb to a great delusion."

In the October 11, 2009, issue of The Boston Globe, he wrote that the decision to commit more troops to Afghanistan may be the most fateful choice of the Obama administration. "If the Afghan war then becomes the consuming issue of Obama's presidency – as Iraq became for his predecessor, as Vietnam did for Lyndon Johnson, and as the Korean War did for Harry Truman – the inevitable effect will be to compromise the prospects of reform more broadly."

In his article "Non Believer" in the July 7, 2010, issue of The New Republic, Bacevich compared President George W. Bush, characterized as wrong-headed but sincere, with President Obama, who, he says, has no belief in the Afghanistan war but pursues it for his own politically cynical reasons: "Who is more deserving of contempt? The commander-in-chief who sends young Americans to die for a cause, however misguided, in which he sincerely believes? Or the commander-in-chief who sends young Americans to die for a cause in which he manifestly does not believe and yet refuses to forsake?"

In an October 2010 interview with Guernica Magazine, Bacevich addressed his seemingly contradictory stance on Obama. While Bacevich supported Obama during the 2008 presidential race in which Obama repeatedly said he believed in the Afghanistan war, Bacevich has become increasingly critical of Obama's decision to commit additional troops to that war: "I interpreted his campaign rhetoric about Afghanistan as an effort to insulate him from the charge of being a national security wimp. His decision to escalate was certainly not a decision his supporters were clamoring for."

Regarding nuclear policy in particular, Bacevich noted in The Limits of Power that there is no feasible scenario under which nuclear weapons could sensibly be used and keeping them entails many other risks: "For the United States, they are becoming unnecessary, even as a deterrent. Certainly, they are unlikely to dissuade the adversaries most likely to employ such weapons against us – Islamic extremists intent on acquiring their own nuclear capability. If anything, the opposite is true. By retaining a strategic arsenal in readiness (and by insisting without qualification that the dropping of atomic bombs on two Japanese cities in 1945 was justified), the United States continues tacitly to sustain the view that nuclear weapons play a legitimate role in international politics ... ."

Bacevich's papers are archived at the Howard Gotlieb Archival Research Center at Boston University.

== Camp Doha incident ==
In July 1991, while Bacevich commanded the 11th Armored Cavalry Regiment at Camp Doha, Kuwait, a fire in an ammunition carrier triggered a series of explosions that caused extensive equipment damage and injuries. Bacevich accepted command responsibility for the disaster and retired from the Army the following year; available accounts do not establish that he personally caused the accident or committed misconduct.

== Personal life ==
On May 13, 2007, Bacevich's son, Andrew John Bacevich, was killed during the Iraq War by an improvised explosive device south of Samarra in Saladin Governorate. His son was a first lieutenant in the U.S. Army, assigned to the 3rd Battalion, 8th U.S. Cavalry Regiment, 1st Cavalry Division. Bacevich also has three daughters.

== Works ==
=== Books ===
- Bacevich, Andrew J. (1986). The Pentomic Era: The US Army between Korea and Vietnam (PDF). Washington, DC: National Defense University Press. OCLC 13525013.
- Diplomat in Khaki: Frank Ross McCoy and American Foreign Policy, 1898–1949 (Lawrence, Kansas: University Press of Kansas, 1989) ISBN 0-7006-0401-4.
- American Empire: The Realities and Consequences of U.S. Diplomacy (Cambridge, Massachusetts: Harvard University Press, 2004) ISBN 0-674-01375-1.
- The New American Militarism: How Americans Are Seduced by War (New York: Oxford University Press, 2005) ISBN 0-19-517338-4.
- The Long War: A New History of U.S. National Security Policy Since World War II (New York: Columbia University Press, 2007) ISBN 0-231-13158-5.
- The Limits of Power: The End of American Exceptionalism (New York: Macmillan, 2008) ISBN 0-8050-8815-6.
- Washington Rules: America's Path to Permanent War (New York: Macmillan, 2010) ISBN 0-8050-9141-6.
- Breach of Trust: How Americans Failed Their Soldiers and Their Country (New York: Metropolitan Books, 2013) ISBN 978-0-8050-8296-8.
- America's War for the Greater Middle East: A Military History (New York: Random House, 2016) ISBN 978-0-553-39393-4.
- Twilight of the American Century (Notre Dame, Indiana: University of Notre Dame Press, 2018) ISBN 978-0-268-10485-6
- The Age of Illusions: How America Squandered Its Cold War Victory (New York: Metropolitan Books, 2020) ISBN 978-1-2501-7508-3
- After the Apocalypse: America's Role in a World Transformed (New York: Metropolitan Books, 2021) ISBN 978-1-2507-9599-1
- On Shedding an Obsolete Past (Haymarket Books, November 15, 2022) ISBN 9781642598674
- Ravens on a Wire (Falling Marbles Press, July, 2024) ISBN 9798990565821

=== Essays and reporting ===
- Bacevich, Andrew J. (Spring 1982). "Family Matters: American Civilian and Military Elites in the Progressive Era". Armed Forces and Society. 8 (3): 405–418. doi:10.1177/0095327X8200800303. JSTOR 45346265.
- Bacevich, Andrew J. (September–October 2008). "America Decides: Is Change in the Heir?". The Diplomat. 7 (3): 28–30.
- Bacevich, Andrew J. (January 2011). "Breaking Washington's Rules". The American Conservative. Vol. 10, no. 1. pp. 23–26.
- Bacevich, Andrew J. (September 2012). "How we became Israel: peace means dominion for Netanyahu—and now for us". The American Conservative.
  - Reprinted: Bacevich, Andrew J. (November 2012). "How we became Israel". Readings. Harper's Magazine. Vol. 325, no. 1950. pp. 17–20.
- Bacevich, Andrew J. (April 27, 2016). "The battle for truth over Saudi Arabia's Role in 9/11".
- Bacevich, Andrew J. (March 2020). "The Old Normal: Why We Can't Beat Our Addiction to War". Harper's Magazine. Vol. 340, no. 2038. pp. 25–32.
- Bacevich, Andrew J. (March–April 2023). "The Reckoning That Wasn't: Why America Remains Trapped by False Dreams of Hegemony". Foreign Affairs. 102 (2): 6–21.

== See also ==
- Republican and conservative support for Barack Obama in 2008
- The Imperial Presidency
