= Operation VETO =

Operation VETO, the investigation by Europol and the police into match fixing in professional football, was announced on 4 February 2013. The investigation was carried out by Europol, the European Union's law enforcement agency, and centred on the influence of organised crime syndicates based in Asia on the results of 380 football matches played in 15 countries around the world, with 425 match officials, club officials, players and criminals were under suspicion. At the time of the announcement, 50 people had been arrested in connection to the scandal.

== Details ==
Details of the investigation revealed that crime syndicates based in Singapore paid almost €2,000,000 in bribes—with the largest individual bribe being €140,000—to fix matches, with accomplices in Europe placing bets via the internet with bookmakers in Asia; these bets would be illegal in Europe, but unregulated in Asia. The scam reportedly produced profits of over €8,000,000.

The operation was active from July 2011 until January 2013.

== Matches affected ==
The majority of matches affected by match-fixing were reportedly played as part of German, Swiss and Turkish football leagues. Further matches in Asia, Africa and Latin and South America were also identified as having been affected. Two World Cup qualifying matches were also named as being under suspicion.

A UEFA Champions League fixture staged in England "within the last three to four years" was cited as one of the matches affected by match-fixing, though Europol declined to give any further details of the match in question. The Danish newspaper Ekstra Bladet claimed that the match involved was Liverpool’s 1–0 win over Hungarian side Debrecen in the group stage of the 2009–10 UEFA Champions League.

== See also ==
- 2011 Turkish football match-fixing scandal
- 2011–12 Italian football match-fixing scandal
- 2013 Lebanese football match-fixing scandal
