= Breach of Trust (Bacevich book) =

2013 US politics book by Andrew J. Bacevich

Breach of Trust: How Americans Failed Their Soldiers and Their Country
- Author: Andrew J. Bacevich
- Language: English
- Genre: Non-fiction
- Publisher: Metropolitan Books
- Publication date: 2013
- Publication place: United States
- ISBN: 978-0-8050-8296-8
- OCLC: 827256998

Breach of Trust: How Americans Failed Their Soldiers and Their Country is a 2013 book by Andrew J. Bacevich, a political scientist whose several areas of expertise include American foreign policy and United States military history. The book is published by the Metropolitan Books imprint of Henry Holt & Company, and is centered on Bacevich's assertion that America's continued mobilization into the future is untenable and ill-advised. This is based on U.S. foreign policy's intention to continually commit the military to overseas engagements, even after the Afghan war's scheduled end in December 2014. Also, this is partially evinced by Army troop strength that will be 10,000 more than in September 2001 by war's end, even as the conflict is currently winding down.

== Bacevich criticism ==
In the book, Bacevich asserts that various facets of American society are accountable for this policy. Parties responsible are an apathetic public, the Pentagon with its budget concerns, "profiteering" contractors, and "naturally" U.S. political leaders. Also included is a "conscience-easing" event staged by the Boston Red Sox one July 4. Furthermore, accountability is affixed to well-known left and right "pro-war" writers, with David Brooks being the most criticized. Bacevich explains that attitudes such as shown by this set of writers has developed from a lack of suffering consequences because consistent forecasting inaccuracies are overlooked, "as long as those failures favor the use of military force". Bacevich also states that citizens of the United States are tasked with the "responsibility for defending the country", and this should not abdicated to resignation, reticence, or a professional contractor army.

== Excerpt ==
Bacevich opens the book with "War is an unvarnished evil. Yet as with other evils—fires that clear out forest undergrowth, floods that replenish soil nutrients—war's legacy can include elements that may partially compensate (or at least appear to compensate) for the havoc inflicted and incurred." Brief statements about the American Civil War and her engagement in World War II follow, which illustrate how the United States emerged, both times, as an "economic power" in the world, after both wars.

== The Washington Post criticism ==
A blog of The Washington Post published concerns about Rachel Maddow's possible conflict of interest in The New York Times review of this book.
