= Rollie Eggmaster =

Kitchen appliance

A Rollie Eggmaster with a skewer inside

The Rollie Eggmaster is a kitchen appliance manufactured by Florida-based company Kedem LLC, first released in 2013. It is described as a "vertical grill" that cooks eggs into a cylindrical, sausage-shaped omelette or "egg lollipop". Eggs (or other food material) are inserted into the hole in the top of the appliance alongside a skewer; it then cooks and extrudes the food upwards, on the skewer. It has been criticized for producing unattractive food.

The Eggmaster consists of a non-stick cylinder surrounded by a heating element. It comes with a cleaning brush, skewers to hold the cooked food, and a recipe book (described as a "dossier of culinary hate crimes" by Rhik Shamadder of The Guardian); its recipes include a hot dog in egg, an "Energy Bar" made of egg white, trail mix, and brown sugar, and a "Pork Egg Master" made of biscuit dough and precooked pork. The primary recipe involves two whole eggs cracked into the top of the Eggmaster after spraying non-stick material inside.

Chef Alton Brown said the Eggmaster "attracts and repels me in equal measure". Lily Hay Newman of Gizmodo described the process of using the Eggmaster as "surreal, somewhat phallic". Shamadder called the Eggmaster "a horrifying, unholy affair" and said its exterior "screams cut-price, mail-order adult toy". Olivia Solon of The Daily Mirror described its shape as "a little bit like a Fleshlight", concluding that "If you really like eggs and single-purpose kitchen utensils, then it might be a worthwhile investment, but otherwise you shouldn't bother shelling out for the Rollie Eggmaster." A Silicon Republic review by Elaine Burke said "While the eggs are edible, the unappetising appearance and unholy smell are too much to overcome." Stephen Colbert joked about the product on The Colbert Report.

Cooked egg on a skewer, from an Eggmaster dupe
