= Fight Pastor =

Mixed martial arts promoter and community services

Fight Pastor is a Christian ministry organization led by Pastor Brandon Beals of Venture Church (formally Canyon Creek Church) in Mill Creek, Washington. Venture Church is a large multi-site church in the Seattle Area. The Fight Pastor ministry provides the mixed martial arts (MMA) community with a wide range of services, including chaplaincy and MMA news from a Christian perspective. Pastor Brandon Beals also hosts a weekly podcast titled Pastors Unfiltered.

== History ==
Fight Pastor was started by Beals in 2009 as a blog on the Venture Church website. Beals is an avid MMA fan and decided to start a separate MMA blog at FightPastor.com.

Beals was interviewed at UFC 100 by the Las Vegas Review-Journal and soon after Yahoo Sports due to the unusual nature of his work. Shortly thereafter, a handful of other media outlets took notice.

Fight Pastor was featured by The New York Times after a reporter stumbled upon Beals' blog and featured it in an article with front page column space.

== Ministry focus ==
The main focus of the Fight Pastor ministry outlined as:

- To be an ambassador for Christ to the MMA community, and,
- to be an ambassador for MMA to the Christian culture.

The ministry of Fight Pastor has been featured on NBC affiliates in Seattle, WA, Montgomery, Alabama, Fort Myers, FL and Augusta, GA as well as international television stations Canal+ and ARD. The Fight Pastor has also been featured in many newspapers nationally from The Herald (Everett, Washington) to Seattle Post-Intelligencer. The May 2011 issue of Ultimate MMA Magazine features an article called "Religious Firestorm" that discusses the Christian faith in mixed martial arts, and Beals' ministry to provide spiritual direction to fighters.

== Chaplaincy and fighter sponsorship ==
Another purpose of Fight Pastor is to provide a chaplain presence in the MMA community, as well as sponsor fighters. Currently, Fight Pastor sponsors Justin Wren and Demico Rogers who were competitors on the tenth season of The Ultimate Fighter.

In 2010 The Fight Pastor began sponsoring and chaplaining Joe Brammer who fought Aaron Riley at UFC 114. Fight Pastor also chaplains Jeremy Stephens and Otto Olson.
