= Vanessa O'Connell =

American journalist

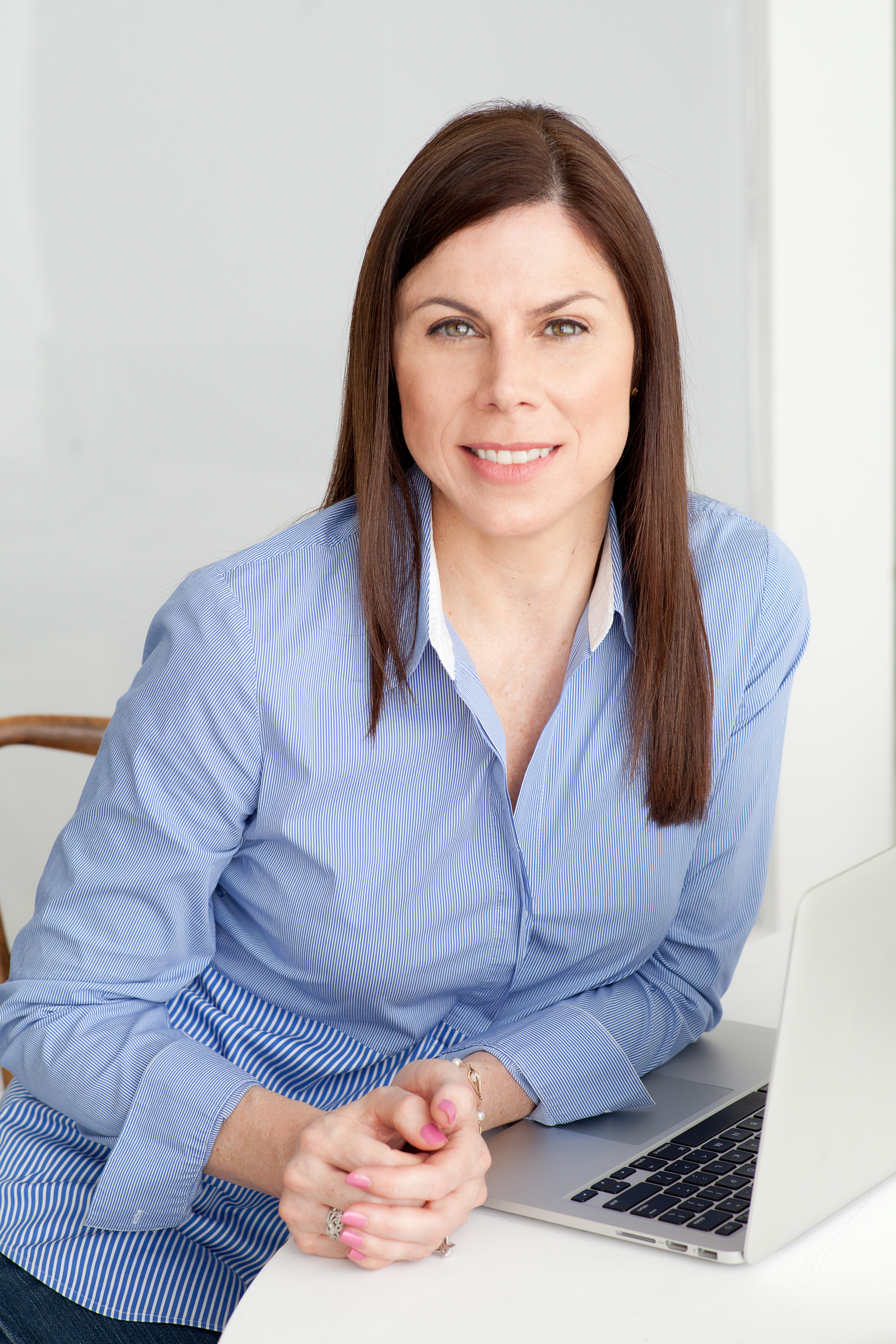
- Born: Vanessa O'Connell; New York, U.S.
- Occupations: Journalist, author, editor
- Notable credit: The Wall Street Journal Reuters

Vanessa O'Connell is an American journalist at Reuters and co-author of Wheelmen: Lance Armstrong, the Tour de France, and the Greatest Sports Conspiracy Ever. As an editor and reporter, O'Connell wrote award-winning stories at The Wall Street Journal.

== Awards ==
- 2011 Gerald Loeb Award for Large Newspapers for the story "Deep Trouble"
