= Stephanie Feeney =

English lutenist, documentary film maker, historical re-enactor, radio presenter

- Born: England
- Genres: Renaissance music
- Occupation(s): Instrumentalist, documentary film maker, historical re-enactor, radio presenter, campaigner, comedian
- Instrument: lute
- Website: {{URL|example.com|optional display text}}

Stephanie Feeney (also commonly performing under the name Lovely Lady Lute) is an English lutenist, documentary film maker, historical re-enactor, radio presenter for Resonance FM, committee member of the British Lute Society, comedian and brain injury campaigner.

== Filmography ==
- Lovely Lady Lute: The Documentary (2018)
