= List of The Colbert Report episodes (2012) =

- No. of episodes: 157

Release
- Original network: Comedy Central

Season chronology
- ← Previous; 2011 episodes Next → 2013 episodes

This is a list of episodes for The Colbert Report in 2012.

== 2012 ==
=== January ===
No.	"The Wørd"	Guest(s)	Introductory phrase	Original release date	Prod. code
974	TBA	Bernie Sanders	N/A	January 3	8036
Stephen tries to guess the outcome of the Iowa caucuses and mourns the death of his archenemy, Kim Jong-il.
975	TBA	John Heilemann	N/A	January 4	8037
The "Santorum surge", Pat Robertson's messages from god about the Republican nominee and the end of the world.
976	"Catch 2012"	Steve Case	A drunk woman rubbed her butt and tried to pee on a $30m expressionist painting. Come on! My five-year old could do that.	January 5	8038
George Will thinks that Rick Santorum is fun, Pat Robertson gets a message from God, and Steve Case explores the benefits of sharing.
977	TBA	Melissa Harris-Perry	Axe body spray has a new product for women. I'm guessing it's mace.	January 9	8039
Stephen covers the build-up to the New Hampshire primary, suggesting the candidates adopt positions based on Magna Carta and other historical documents and whether or not Rick Santorum said black people shouldn't receive welfare.
978	TBA	Bill Moyers	TBA	January 10	8040
Mitt Romney takes heat for a firing gaffe, conservative pundits attack White House celebrations, and Bill Moyers considers corporate personhood a threat to democracy.
979	TBA	George Stephanopoulos	Congratulations on your new baby, Beyoncé. One word of advice: "If you feed it, then you'd better put a bib on it".	January 11	8041
Stephen mulls over the "inevitability" of Mitt Romney, announces that he is considering jumping into the South Carolina Republican primary following polling that put him ahead of Jon Huntsman, Jr. and reports on the failure of the Russian probe Fobos-Grunt.
980	TBA	Michael Allen	TBA	January 12	8042
Stephen makes Jon Stewart the new head of his Super Pac, which is renamed "The definitely not coordinating with Stephen Colbert Super PAC", announces that he is forming an exploratory committee to run for President of the "United States of South Carolina" and talks to Mike D about a crossword clue provided by Will Shortz.
981	"Raise Cain"	Reverend Scott Douglas	Happy Martin Luther King Day! I don't see race, but I do see holidays when I should not be working.	January 16	8044
Stephen claims his formation of an exploratory committee has forced Jon Huntsman, Jr. out of the race, talks about social conservative leaders' endorsement of Rick Santorum and negative advertising in South Carolina.
982	TBA	Jennifer Granholm	Romney and Gingrich are polling ahead of Rick Perry in his home state. It is official - you can mess with Texas.	January 17	8045
A controversial Colbert Super PAC ad surfaces, Pastor Ed Young leads a sexperimental crusade, and Jennifer Granholm confesses secrets from her past.
983	TBA	David Frum	President Obama is going to speak at Disney World tomorrow. He is cutting all funding to Space Mountain.	January 18	8046
Mitt Romney faces questions about his tax rate, Stephen announces his South Carolina rally, and David Frum shares his hopes for the Republican Party.
984	TBA	Carrie Rebora Barratt	TBA	January 19	8047
Rick Perry drops out of the GOP race, Newt Gingrich's ex-wife exposes his controversial marital request, and Carrie Rebora Barratt discusses historical American art.
985	TBA	Bruce Bueno de Mesquita	Congratulations Giants and Patriots! Way to stick it to those dwarves and traitors.	January 23	8048
Newt Gingrich wins South Carolina, Stephen recalls the South Cain-olina Primary Rally with Herman Cain, and Bruce Bueno de Mesquita explores the applications of game theory.
986	TBA	Andrew Sullivan	A dentist used paper clips in a root canal. So that's what MacGyver's been doing.	January 24	8049
Rick Santorum panders to the elderly, Maurice Sendak discusses his literary work, and Andrew Sullivan praises Barack Obama's greatest accomplishments.
987	TBA	Terry Gross	TBA	January 25	8050
Barack Obama delivers his State of the Union address, Maurice Sendak gives Stephen a storybook ending, and Terry Gross provides a fresh perspective on in-depth interviews.
988	TBA	Drew Barrymore	TBA	January 26	8051
Newt Gingrich and Mitt Romney woo Florida; John Harwood, Katrina vanden Heuvel and David Cassidy answer hard-hitting questions; and Drew Barrymore considers an "E.T." prequel.
989	TBA	Laurence H. Tribe	TBA	January 30	8052
Stephen repossesses the Colbert Super PAC, Newt Gingrich and Mitt Romney compete for the Hispanic vote in Florida, and Laurence Tribe explores constitutional law.
990	"American History X'd"	Björk	A Dutch zoo put contact lenses on an elephant. He looks so much younger without the glasses!	January 31	8053
Sarah Palin spitefully endorses Newt Gingrich, Tennessee Tea Partiers strive to remove slavery from school textbooks, and Björk explores new methods for creating music.

=== February ===
Taping of February 15 and 16 were cancelled due to illness of Colbert's Mother.

No.	"The Wørd"	Guest(s)	Introductory phrase	Original release date	Prod. code
991	TBA	Ameena Matthews	This is shaping up to be second warmest winter in U.S. history. Finally, I can wear my down tankini.	February 1	8054
Mitt Romney beats Newt Gingrich in Florida, Stephen announces Americone Dream's 2012 election edition packaging, and Ameena Matthews strives to end gang violence.
992	TBA	Christiane Amanpour	Sunday is the big game, and did you know there's a version of the Puppy Bowl, but with people?	February 2	8055
Stephen unveils GOP super PACs' biggest donors, Newt Gingrich faces a copyright infringement lawsuit, and Christiane Amanpour examines Iran's political environment.
993	TBA	Bill McKibben	A college student found cocaine in a book she ordered off of Amazon. Customers who purchased this book also bought 20 dollar bills, hand mirrors, and tape recorders for all their brilliant ideas.	February 13	8056
The New York Knicks' Jeremy Lin seduces America, Stephen writes a love letter to Jimmy Fallon, and Bill McKibben fights the Keystone XL pipeline.
994	TBA	William J. Broad	Arizona turns 100 today, finally catching up with most of its residents.	February 14	8057
Catholics oppose the Obama administration's birth control mandate, a Seattle woman marries a building, and William Broad considers the effects of yoga on the mind and body.
995	TBA	Ann Patchett	TBA	February 20	8058
Mitt Romney deploys Donald Trump in Michigan, Rick Santorum attacks environmentalists, and Ann Patchett fights to revive bookstores.
996	TBA	Robert Kagan	It's Fat Tuesday or, as Americans call it, Tuesday.	February 21	8059
Prince Pierre Casiraghi of Monaco sustains a beating, Nancy Pelosi slams Colbert Super PAC, and Robert Kagan examines Iran's potential nuclear threat.
997	"Surrender To A Buyer Power"	Nancy Pelosi	Nevada has legalized driverless cars, proving there's nothing they won't gamble on.	February 22	8060
Stephen gives up something he truly enjoys for Lent, Target knows when customers miss their periods, and Nancy Pelosi objects to super PACs.
998	TBA	Plácido Domingo	TBA	February 23	8061
Mitt Romney wins the Arizona GOP debate, Elie Wiesel protests the Mormon conversion of dead Jews, and Plácido Domingo discusses his operatic performances.
999	TBA	King Peggy	TBA	February 27	8062
The Oscars' liberal clusterfarce unfolds, Rick Santorum criticizes Barack Obama's promotion of higher learning, and Peggielene Bartels talks about her kingship.
1,000	TBA	Ross Eisenbrey	McDonald's is launching the McBaguette in France. Wait 'til those people try French fries.	February 28	8063
The Colbert Report airs its 1000th episode, rising oil prices threaten Barack Obama's approval rating, and Ross Eisenbrey examines the problem of unpaid labor.
1,001	"Change We Can Believe In"	William Shatner	North Korea agrees to suspend its nuclear program. Kim Jong-il must be rolling over in his shoebox.	February 29	8064
Mitt Romney takes Michigan, researchers develop a male birth control pill, and William Shatner revels in his own beauty.

=== March ===
No.	"The Wørd"	Guest(s)	Introductory phrase	Original release date	Prod. code
1,002	TBA	Claire Danes	TBA	March 1	8065
Republicans eye Jeb Bush as a potential GOP candidate, researchers discover a 3500-year-old "Yo Mama" joke, and Claire Danes discusses mental health.
1,003	TBA	Audra McDonald	TBA	March 5	8066
Stephen yields to the inevitability of Mitt Romney, Rush Limbaugh apologizes to Sandra Fluke, and Stephen performs "Summertime" with Audra McDonald.
1,004	"Due or Die"	Jonathan Safran Foer	TBA	March 6	8067
Stephen prepares a Super Tuesday tailgating party, Attorney General Holder redefines due process, candy bars shrink, and Jonathan Safran Foer talks Passover traditions.
1,005	TBA	Willem Dafoe	Happy hundredth birthday Oreos. To celebrate, I'll be eating a hundred Oreos today. Same as every day.	March 7	8068
Stephen prepares for Super Tuesday results, CNN visits a virtual Republican National Convention, Iran poses a new threat, and Willem Dafoe goes Martian for "John Carter."
1,006	TBA	Don Fleming, Elvis Costello, & Emmylou Harris	TBA	March 8	8069
Stephen prank calls Eric Bolling, is inspired by Herman Cain's avant-garde ad, and talks folk music with Elvis Costello, Emmylou Harris and Don Fleming.
1,007	TBA	Katherine Boo	TBA	March 12	8070
The Republican Southern primary leads to blue collar pandering, Dave "Mudcat" Saunders talks Southern strategy, and Katherine Boo discusses poverty and Mumbai's slums.
1,008	TBA	Andrew Bird	TBA	March 13	8071
Seattle's Pop Conference overlooks Stephen's dissertation; Pat Robertson and Muslim-American reality shows pose threats; and Andrew Bird performs "Eyeoneye."
1,009	TBA	Mark McKinnon	TBA	March 14	8072
Greg Smith is a "Banker-dict Arnold," Rick Santorum condemns teleprompters, Kermit the Frog weighs in on the GOP primaries, and Mark McKinnon talks about reforming Congress.
1,010	TBA	Dexter Filkins	TBA	March 15	8073
Stephen is suspicious of geriatric jihadists, Rick Santorum speaks from his heart, and Dexter Filkins tells Stephen why we need other countries.
1,011	"Dressed to Kill"	David Page	A Canadian court has legalized brothels. But by the time all those layers of wool come off, the hour's up.	March 26	8074
Geraldo Rivera blames the Trayvon Martin shooting on hoodies, Mitt Romney boosts Etch A Sketch sales, and biomedical researcher Dr. David Page defends the Y chromosome.
1,012	TBA	Charles Murray	The U.S. soccer team failed to make the Olympics. Now if only soccer would fail to make the Olympics.	March 27	8075
The Barack Obama-gun control conspiracy continues, a new drug cures prejudice, taco delivery meets technology, and Charles Murray discusses the state of white America.
1,013	TBA	Mark Ruffalo	TBA	March 28	8076
The Supreme Court weighs in on Obamacare, a new magazine targets conservative teens, and Mark Ruffalo discusses the dangers of fracking.
1,014	TBA	Peter Beinart	Atlantic City has a new slogan: "Do AC". Meanwhile, Anderson Cooper has a new slogan: "What are you doing? Get off me".	March 29	8077
Stephen involves college students with Colbert Super PAC, Mitt Romney tries comedy, and Peter Beinart discusses Israel.

=== April ===
No.	"The Wørd"	Guest(s)	Introductory phrase	Original release date	Prod. code
1,015	TBA	Gary Johnson	The Himalayas will stop growing in 20 million years, but until then we still have to buy them new sneakers every six months.	April 2	8078
College students order up Colbert Super PAC's Super Fun Pack, beef state governors defend pink slime, and Governor Gary Johnson runs as the 2012 Libertarian candidate.
1,016	TBA	Nikki Haley	N/A	April 3	8079
Colbert Super PAC Super Fun Pack adds not-legal advice, Colbert Super PAC SHH! faces scrutiny, Rick Santorum speaks from his heart, and Governor Nikki Haley challenges Stephen.
1,017	TBA	Robert Ballard	The NFL debuted more aerodynamic uniforms, now there will be less drag when players are carted off the field.	April 4	8080
Colbert Super PAC segments earn a Peabody award, Mitt Romney must appeal to Latino voters, Quaker Oats gets a facelift, and deep sea explorer Robert Ballard talks Titanic.
1,018	TBA	Anne Rice	N/A	April 5	8081
Unemployment drops, Colbert's Very Wanted tracks a mailbox mutilator, a biker brightens Stephen's commute, and Anne Rice deals with werewolf psychology in "The Wolf Gift."
1,019	TBA	Bob Lutz	N/A	April 9	8082
The Easter Bunny gets competition down under, Mitt Romney seeks a potential running mate, Germany's elderly gymnast depresses Stephen, and Bob Lutz talks car business.
1,020	TBA	Richard Hersh	30% of online traffic is porn, according to the New England Journal of Underestimating Things.	April 10	8083
Rick Santorum drops his presidential campaign, the EPA sets coal industry regulations, Stephen honors male "Lady Heroes," and Richard Hersh examines higher education.
1,021	"Whuh-How?"	Michelle Obama	N/A	April 11	8084
Troops and their families face unique economic challenges, Stephen trains a Marine to be a pundit, and Michelle Obama voices support for military families.
1,022	TBA	James Cameron	The Newt Gingrich campaign bounced a $500 check. It was returned for insufficient grip on reality.	April 12	8085
Mitt Romney flips the "war on women" script with the help of Hilary Rosen, survivalist singles embrace online dating, and director James Cameron talks "Titanic 3D."
1,023	TBA	Bonnie Raitt	N/A	April 16	8086
The Secret Service commits a sex scandal, Newt Gingrich endorses global gun rights, and blues performer Bonnie Raitt sings from her album "Slipstream."
1,024	TBA	Jonah Lehrer	A Connecticut 5-year old brought 50 bags of heroin to his class for show and tell. Well, at least he brought enough for everyone.	April 17	8087
Mitt Romney reveals his prankster side, insects add food color, chickens take drugs, to Starbucks drinks, GSA spending spurs outrage, and Jonah Lehrer explores creativity.
1,025	"Gateway Hug"	Arianna Huffington	Only 100 days until the London Olympics. I can't wait to see the Queen in the Hammer throw.	April 18	8088
Mitt Romney seeks a bland running mate, Tennessee outlaws "gateway sexual activity" education, survivalists plan for the unthinkable, and Arianna Huffington talks journalism.
1,026	TBA	Tavis Smiley & Cornel West	Ted Nugent met with the secret service today. No word no how much he charged them for the Wango Tango.	April 19	8089
Cory Booker saves one of his constituents, bologna smuggling is on the rise, Time Magazine honors Stephen, and guests Tavis Smiley and Cornel West talk poverty in America.
1,027	TBA	Don McLeroy	Neil Diamond has married someone 29 years his junior, don't worry, she'll be a woman... soon.	April 23	8090
Steve Doocy reports on Barack Obama's subtext, Arizona redefines pregnancy, Mitt Romney insults a Pittsburgh bakery, and Don McLeroy discusses textbook standards.
1,028	TBA	Magnus Carlsen	N/A	April 24	8091
Super Tuesday II goes live, Stephen plugs his children's book, Julie Andrews discusses fairy tales, Canada creates a bioluminescent coin, and Magnus Carlsen talks chess.
1,029	"United We Can't Stand Them"	Michael Sandel	I like to think outside the box. Then, when I'm tired of thinking, I get back in my box.	April 25	8092
NASA shuts down Spacebook, CAPS blames immigrants for global warming, feeding tube diets and male birth control gain popularity, and Michael Sandel considers market ethics.
1,030	TBA	Jack White	James Carville says Mitt Romney stole one of his famous lines. I don't remember Romney saying "Hello children, I live in your nightmares."	April 26	8093
Republicans attack Barack Obama's slow jam, Stephen releases the first Super Fun Pack treasure hunt clue, and Jack White discusses his first solo album, "Blunderbuss."
1,031	""Don't ask, don't show & tell""	Diane Keaton	The New York Yankees have their own cologne, it's made from the most expensive ingredients of all the competing colognes.	April 30	8094
Chen Guangcheng escapes house arrest, Missouri wants to outlaw sexuality dialogue in schools, companies offer "concealed carry" clothing, and Diane Keaton promotes her memoir.

=== May ===
No.	"The Wørd"	Guest(s)	Introductory phrase	Original release date	Prod. code
1,032	TBA	Carne Ross	The TSA says explosives may be hidden in fake breasts, be on the look out for Mula Achmed Mu-Hmna Hmna Hmna Hmna.	May 1	8095
Barack Obama makes an Osama bin Laden ad, Paul Ryan plans cuts to poor people, Rev. Thomas Reese contests Paul Ryan's budget, and Carne Ross recommends leaderless democracy.
1,033	"Debt Panels"	Jonathan Haidt	A California treasure hunter says he found Bin laden's body, he has a very loose definition of the word treasure.	May 2	8096
Designers craft a Richard Branson ice mold, debt collectors infiltrate hospitals, Germany censures Kermit the Frog, and Jonathan Haidt discusses conflict and politics.
1,034	TBA	Lena Dunham	N/A	May 3	8097
Newt Gingrich suspends his campaign and backs Mitt Romney, Stephen tracks a Super PAC rival, Buzz Aldrin presents a space award, and writer Lena Dunham talks "Girls."
1,035	TBA	Andy Cohen	According to a new study, dinosaur farts may have caused prehistoric Global Warming. You know what they say, he who stinked it, is extinct.	May 7	8098
L.A. teens drink Purell, Joe Biden supports same-sex marriage, Eric McCormack plays a straight man, bears hijack broadcasting, and TV host Andy Cohen talks entertainment.
1,036	TBA	Michelle Alexander	N/A	May 8	8099
Billionaires need donor anonymity, Claire McCaskill opposes secret money, Stephen honors the late Maurice Sendak, and Michelle Alexander examines racial inequality.
1,037	TBA	Anna Wintour	N/A	May 9	8100
An ex-Playmate jolts Mexico's debate, North Carolina snubs gay marriage as Barack Obama backs it, Jon McNaughton paints socialist America, and Anna Wintour talks fashion.
1,038	TBA	Dr. Francis Collins	Nearly 40% of New York's 911 calls are butt dials. Which begs the question, who is attacking New York's butts?	May 10	8101
Stephen salutes Mother's Day, Barack Obama rejects Jesus, gay strokes and monkeys threaten America, Republicans forge identities, and Francis Collins examines obesity.
1,039	TBA	Charlize Theron	Romney wins the Texas primary. Congratulations Mitt Romney, you've gone from presumptive nominee to zumptive nominee.	May 29	8102
The Peabody Awards and Maxim honor Stephen, Donald Trump supports Mitt Romney, Egyptians protest both presidential candidates, and Charlize Theron explores dark fables.
1,040	TBA	Alan Alda	Facebook stock continues to plummet, people started selling once they found out their mom bought it too.	May 30	8103
A Mexican cartel burns down PepsiCo, gay bars target bachelorettes, Mitt Romney breaks into iPhone apps, Robert Mugabe heads global tourism, and Alan Alda talks science.
1,041	"Two Birds With One Drone"	Jack Hitt	N/A	May 31	8104
"I Am A Pole (And So Can You!)" gains Best Seller status, the Obama administration redefines "combatants," Michael Bloomberg confronts soda, and Jack Hitt talks amateurism.

=== June ===
No.	"The Wørd"	Guest(s)	Introductory phrase	Original release date	Prod. code
1,042	"Sink or Swim"	John Lewis	N/A	June 4	8105
America's leaders talk like teens, North Carolina bans climate change models, Represent-O-Map 6000 fuels BKAD bookings, and John Lewis describes the civil rights movement.
1,043	TBA	Jill Biden	Celine Dion says she is sick of the theme from Titanic. So now it's unanimous.	June 5	8106
The CDC denies the zombie apocalypse, America exports the most sperm, a North Dakota woman marries herself, and Dr. Jill Biden reflects on teaching and troops.
1,044	TBA	Neil Patrick Harris	N/A	June 6	8107
The private sector plans Mars reality TV, Scott Walker prevails in Wisconsin, an Arkansas town bans bingo, Neil Patrick Harris talks theater, and Stephen honors Ray Bradbury.
1,045	TBA	Regina Spektor	Scientists say dinosaurs were skinnier than we think, well the ones in the museum certainly nothing but bone.	June 7	8108
Pakistan's "Sesame Street" faces corruption, Mitt Romney's house meets critique, a pig divides America, and singer Regina Spektor talks about music and Russia.
1,046	TBA	Martin Sheen	N/A	June 11	8109
Neil deGrasse Tyson wrecks movies, the Church scorns a nun's sex book, Simone Campbell explores service, the Banana Bunker prevents bruising, and Martin Sheen talks acting.
1,047	TBA	Will Allen	The LA Kings won the Stanley Cup, or Stanley King won the LA Cup. I don't follow hockey.	June 12	8110
Mitt Romney owns a competition horse, the U.S. leaks anti-terror info, Barack Obama blunders, Stephen seeks Sweden's Twitter, and Will Allen talks urban farms.
1,048	"Free Lunch"	Gregg Allman	N/A	June 13	8111
Niagara Falls welcomes a stuntman, cafeteria workers demand expired food, orangutans operate iPads, and Gregg Allman recalls his rock 'n' roll past.
1,049	TBA	Steve Coll	N/A	June 14	8112
Marijuana initiatives enter the election, Super PACs raise more money than ad space, Xiaflex treatment corrects curved penises, and Steve Coll examines ExxonMobil.
1,050	TBA	Paul Krugman	Mike Tyson's one man show is coming to Broadway. Finally a show as dangerous as Spider-man.	June 18	8113
Barack Obama changes immigration policy, Neil Munro interrupts the president, Sweden confronts Stephen's Twitter-control crusade, and Paul Krugman talks economic strategy.
1,051	TBA	Olivia Wilde	N/A	June 19	8114
John Kerry plays Mitt Romney in practice debates, Stephen invents a dressage tradition, PooPrints tracks suburban dog waste, and Olivia Wilde talks Maxim and politics.
1,052	TBA	Daniel Klaidman	A beverage company has developed a beer for dogs. Great, now I need a new designated driver.	June 20	8115
Asians outnumber Mexican immigrants, the "Fast and Furious" scandal proves complex, a gun control ad causes controversy, and Daniel Klaidman examines the war on terror.
1,053	TBA	Lawrence Krauss	N/A	June 21	8116
Officials delay Egypt's presidential election, penguins engage in erotic sex, Stephen sings to Sweden's Twitter executives, and Lawrence Krauss discusses the universe.
1,054	"Silver Maligning"	Frank Deford	A Swedish woman had to sit next to a corpse on a ten-hour flight. Well, at least she got both armrests.	June 25	8117
The Supreme Court postpones Obamacare rulings, Mitt Romney asks Florida to limit good jobs news, recession, teens abuse drugs to study better, and Frank Deford explores sports writing.
1,055	TBA	Richard Ford	There's going to be a Spice Girls musical! I'll tell you what I want, what I really, really want. Not that.	June 26	8118
The Supreme Court overturns Arizona's immigration law, Pixar flaunts its gay agenda, Dish Network's AutoHop eliminates TV ads, and novelist Richard Ford talks "Canada."
1,056	TBA	Melinda Gates	TBA	June 27	8119
Democrats fall behind in fundraising, Mike Turzai spurs voter ID controversy, Oreo cookies come out of the closet, and Melinda Gates talks global health and family planning.
1,057	TBA	Aaron Sorkin	TBA	June 28	8120
Obamacare passes as constitutional, Republicans slam John Roberts, Emily Bazelon explains the Obamacare tax, and Aaron Sorkin romanticizes TV journalism in "The Newsroom."

=== July ===
No.	"The Wørd"	Guest(s)	Introductory phrase	Original release date	Prod. code
1,058	TBA	Anne-Marie Slaughter	Sarah Palin hasn't been invited to the GOP Convention, but that's okay, she can see it from her front porch.	July 16	8121
Katie Holmes divorces Tom Cruise, Mitt Romney retroactively retires from Bain Capital, Starbucks hits funeral homes, and Anne-Marie Slaughter talks career choice and family.
1,059	"On The Straight & Narrow-Minded"	Nas	TBA	July 17	8122
Nevada's presidential ballot threatens Mitt Romney, Texas Republicans reject critical thinking education, the Rosenbach Museum honors Stephen, and Nas talks hip-hop.
1,060	TBA	Mayor Annise D. Parker	The man with the world's largest penis was patted down by the TSA. Come on! You're supposed to put that thing in a separate tray.	July 18	8123
Mitt Romney spotlights struggling waiters, tablet computers go Christian, Def Leppard forges its songs, and Houston Mayor Annise Parker talks gay marriage.
1,061	TBA	Lisa Jackson	N/A	July 19	8124
Police bust Fred Willard for lewd conduct, Dave Leonhardt explores the Libor scandal, Canadians out-earn Americans, and Lisa Jackson talks green standards.
1,062	TBA	Vikram Gandhi	It's National Vanilla Ice Cream Day, and, if Romney is elected, it'll go on for four more years.	July 23	8125
Mike Tyson bails on The Report, liberal shills love Shepard Smith, pundits speculate James Holmes' political ties, and filmmaker Vikram Gandhi explores made-up philosophy.
1,063	TBA	James Fallows	A London newspaper says the Olympics will open with thirty Mary Poppins' fighting a forty foot Voldemort... again?	July 24	8126
Late night television triggers depression, America faces a disastrous drought, NASA schedules vegan meals, and James Fallows talks about China's aircraft and airlines.
1,064	"1 Man Show"	Dan Gross	N/A	July 25	8127
Mitt Romney values his Anglo-Saxon heritage, Barack Obama discusses entrepreneurship, "Fifty Shades of Grey" reaches hotels, and Dan Gross shares his gun control campaign.
1,065	TBA	Peter Westmacott	North Korean Dictator Kim Jong Un has married. The couple is registered at Bed, Bath, and Enriched Uranium.	July 26	8128
Engineers enhance Olympic sounds, Mitt Romney offends England, Chick-Fil-A opposes gay marriage, and Peter Westmacott discusses the 2012 London Summer Olympics.
1,066	TBA	Joan Rivers	TBA	July 30	8129
Danny Boyle directs the 2012 Olympics opening ceremony, Mitt Romney lacks dressage expertise, Tony Robbins' fire stunt burns participants, and Joan Rivers shares her memoir.
1,067	TBA	Jeff Koons	India is crippled by power failures. Have they tried unplugging the country and plugging it back in?	July 31	8130
Mitt Romney's press secretary lashes out, Rafalca delays Mitt's VP announcement, Colbert Nation plans for StePhest Colbchella '012, and Jeff Koons explores arts education.

=== August ===
No.	"The Wørd"	Guest(s)	Introductory phrase	Original release date	Prod. code
1,068	TBA	John Grunsfeld	N/A	August 1	8131
Obamacare mandates birth control coverage, Democrats pass a Democratic tax bill, U.S. women's gymnastics wins Olympic gold, and John Grunsfeld shares NASA's plan for Mars.
1,069	TBA	Chris Hayes	N/A	August 2	8132
Rafalca finishes one round of Olympic dressage, Russ Carnahan touts Missouri's redistricted district, plants talk to each other, and Chris Hayes describes U.S. elitism.
1,070	TBA	Pete Seeger	Porn star Jenna Jameson has endorsed Mitt Romney for President. Well, she is a job creator.	August 6	8133
NASA's Curiosity rover arrives on Mars, Mike Huckabee's "Chick-fil-A Appreciation Day" boosts sales, and activist Pete Seeger discusses his music career and upbringing.
1,071	TBA	Mark Shriver	N/A	August 7	8134
Alisyn Camerota criticizes U.S. patriotism, Wikipedia writers sway elections, Steve King defends dogfighting, and Mark Shriver highlights his father's civic influence.
1,072	TBA	Liza Mundy	July was the hottest month in US history. I blame Magic Mike.	August 8	8135
Obamacare increases Papa John's pizza rates, digital pills hold seniors accountable, General Mills backs same-sex marriage, and Liza Mundy examines women in the workforce.
1,073	TBA	Woody Harrelson	N/A	August 9	8136
Michele Bachmann dabbles in McCarthyism, Representative Keith Ellison turns down Mitt Romney, scientists analyze truthiness, and Woody Harrelson talks theater.
1,074	TBA	fun.	N/A	August 13	8137
StePhest Colbchella '012 gets underway, Mitt Romney picks Paul Ryan as his running mate, and fun. reviews their history and hygiene.
1,075	TBA	Grizzly Bear	N/A	August 14	8138
Colbchella '012 launches into night two, Mitt Romney's foreign experience comes into question, celebrities simulate soldiers, and Grizzly Bear describes their indie style.
1,076	TBA	Santigold	N/A	August 15	8139
StePhest Colbchella '012 embarks on night three, U.S. gymnastics' Fierce Five stops by The Report, Stephen visits the USS Intrepid, and Santigold discusses her music.
1,077	TBA	The Flaming Lips	N/A	August 16	8140
Mitt Romney and Paul Ryan connect over policy, GOP Senate candidates challenge the 17th Amendment, and The Flaming Lips' Wayne Coyne shares his latest album.
1,078	TBA	Andrew Sullivan	Episode MMXII AMERICA STRIKES BACK It is a dark time for America, but not on a racist way. Democratic minions have driven universal health care through Congress, and now threaten to do the unthinkable: be re-elected. Hungry for power, DARK LORD OBAMA - again, not "racist" dark, just evil - has summoned a hurricane to scatter the Patriotic Alliance. But all is not lost. A group of freedom fighters led by Mitt Romney and his billionaire mentor Obi-Wan REDACTED, have established a new secret base in the remote, humid city of Tampa...	August 28	8141
Hurricane Isaac hits the 2012 GOP convention, Stephen hosts Colbert Super PAC's Convention, Rep. Todd Akin blunders on rape pregnancy, and Andrew Sullivan talks U.S. politics.
1,079	TBA	Jennifer Burns	Episode II RETURN OF THE AMERICA STRIKES BACK, AGAIN Desperate to maintain their grip on power, the EVIL DEM-PIRE has dispatched countless attack ads into the far reaches of the Swing States. Also, Solyndra. Meanwhile on the swamp planet of Tampa, PRINCESS ANN ROMNEIA and CHRISTIE THE HUTT rally the Republican troops with news of the Rebel leader MITT ROMNEY's detailed plans to save America - which he will probably reveal right after the Election...	August 29	8142
The "Mitt Romney story" storms the GOP convention, Ann Romney tries to reach women voters, Paul Ryan breaks from Ayn Rand, and Jennifer Burns explores Ayn Rand's objectivism.
1,080	TBA	Jon Huntsman	Episode III The PHANTOM MONEY The EVIL EMPEROR OBAMA-TINE continues to run up the Empire's debt with entitlement programs Tatooine can't afford, like Ewokcare and tuition block grants for inner-city Jawas. But a new hero from the Republican Alliance emerges: JAR JAR RYAN. After years on the ice planet Wisconsin, training with his mentor AYN-BIN-WAN RAND-OBI, he is ready to slash all non-Death Star spending and unleash the invisible Force of the Free market...	August 30	8143
Mitt Romney struggles to attract African American voters, Paul Ryan lies in his GOP convention speech, and Jon Huntsman examines campaign finance and the Republican Party.
1,081	TBA	James Carville	Episode IV A NEW-ISH HOPE After plunging the Dem-pire into $15 trillion of Astro debt, GRAND MOFF OBAMA threatens to "slow the rise of the oceans and heal the planet." But the Republican Alliance has a secret weapon: the brave droid R2-MITT-2, who has assembled a crack team of freedom fighters: QUI-GON RYAN, HAN RUBIO, and CLINT CALRISSIAN with his faithful companion CHAIRBACCA. R2-MITT-2 vows to end Obama's reign of environmental terror, making the galaxy safe for the Jedi Knights (The Top 1%, The Force Creators)...	August 31	8144
Mitt Romney wraps up the GOP convention, Clint Eastwood's empty chair joins Stephen, Neil Armstrong passes away, and James Carville talks about the middle class.

=== September ===
No.	"The Wørd"	Guest(s)	Introductory phrase	Original release date	Prod. code
1,082	TBA	Reihan Salam	N/A	September 4	8145
The DNC convention begins, Congresswoman Yvette Clarke praises Brooklyn's diversity, Paul Ryan lies about marathon times, and Reihan Salam explores election politics.
1,083	TBA	Michael Grunwald	N/A	September 5	8146
Brit Hume critiques the DNC convention noise level, Michelle Obama rakes in record tweet numbers, and Michael Grunwald explores the American Recovery and Reinvestment Act.
1,084	TBA	Bill Richardson	N/A	September 6	8147
Storms disrupt the Democratic National Convention, Bill Clinton delivers a charming speech, Democrats reinstate "God" language, and Bill Richardson talks Hispanic outreach.
1,085	TBA	Ed Rendell	TBA	September 7	8148
Destroyed morals attract the youth, Barack Obama accepts the Democratic nomination, Stephen compares the conventions, and Ed Rendell blasts government leadership.
1,086	TBA	Drew Faust	It's the one year anniversary of Occupy Wall Street. Remember, one IS the pepper spray Anniversary.	September 17	8149
Rick Santorum blunders at a conservative summit, Mitt Romney comments on the Middle East riots, Ira Glass calls the Atone Phone, and Drew Faust reviews Civil War history.
1,087	TBA	Jeffrey Toobin	Walmart is turning 50 years old. It's finally old enough to be a greeter at itself.	September 18	8150
USA Today redesigns its logo, Mitt Romney responds to secret fundraiser footage, Apple wins a patent lawsuit, and Jeffrey Toobin details Supreme Court cases.
1,088	"Ask Not"	Itzhak Perlman	Swedish doctors have performed the world's first uterus transplant. Unfortunately, the guy went in for a new heart.	September 19	8151
Fox News slams Barack Obama's secret video, Mitt Romney explains what he won't do in office, a papyrus scrap mentions Jesus' wife, and violinist Itzhak Perlman performs live.
1,089	TBA	Errol Morris	N/A	September 20	8152
Vladimir Putin hang-glides with cranes, Mitt Romney tries to sway Hispanics, an amateur art restorer defaces Jesus, and Errol Morris talks Jeffrey MacDonald and filmmaking.
1,090	TBA	Claressa Shields	I have got an iPhone 5... and Apple Maps says I'm in Norway.	September 25	8153
Barack Obama leads Mitt Romney in the polls, Peggy Noonan gives Mitt advice, the NFL lockout bumps up ratings, and boxer Claressa Shields describes a satisfying punch.
1,091	TBA	Jim Holt	The University of Tennessee frat members were caught butt-chugging wine. That sounds like some drunk assholes.	September 26	8154
The world faces an unavoidable bacon shortage, President Obama restores the Ottoman Empire, churchgoers pray for Mitt Romney, and Jim Holt ponders the universe.
1,092	TBA	Vince Gilligan	N/A	September 27	8155
Stephen promotes "America Again," Mitt Romney ignores discouraging polls, Fox News doubts the election forecast, and Vince Gilligan explores his series "Breaking Bad."

=== October ===
Taping of October 29 and 30 were cancelled due to Hurricane Sandy.

No.	"The Wørd"	Guest(s)	Introductory phrase	Original release date	Prod. code
1,093	"Supply Chained"	Ben Folds Five	N/A	October 1	9001
Paul Ryan tiptoes around tax plan costs, U.S. prison labor threatens small business, Iran's presidential aides visit Costco, and Ben Folds Five explains their album title.
1,094	TBA	Jorge Ramos	The lead singer of Creed says he won't endorse President Obama. Well that settles it, Obama will not win the 1998 Presidential Election.	October 2	9002
Stephen releases "America Again," Skyline Church pastor endorses politicians on Pulpit Freedom Sunday, the Romney camp praises Obama's rhetoric, and Jorge Ramos talks immigration policy.
1,095	TBA	Kenny Rogers	Amateur pornographers were found filming in the Cornell University library. Clearly, they could not get into the Harvard library.	October 3	9003
America meets Mitt Romney for the first time, George Will points out Obama's racial advantage, doctors treat low testosterone, and Kenny Rogers recounts his music career.
1,096	TBA	Dr. George Church	N/A	October 4	9004
Mitt Romney pledges to defund PBS, Chris Matthews berates Barack Obama, Pennsylvania rules against voter ID laws, and Harvard geneticist George Church explores DNA.
1,097	"It's Not Easy Having Green"	Mark Kelly	It's Columbus Day. Don't forget to infect an Indian.	October 8	9005
Lower unemployment rates prompt GOP conspiracy theories, rich Americans want Obama's respect, World of Warcraft shapes a state campaign, and Mark Kelly talks mice in space.
1,098	TBA	Morrissey	NASA's Curiosity Rover has found a small shiney object on Mars. It's either the top of a giant metal city buried beneath the sands, or a screw.	October 9	9006
Barack Obama seeks "obsessive" supporters, the Russian Church blesses the North Pole, Mitt Romney vaguely bullies four countries, and Morrissey slams the British Royal Family.
1,099	"Meducation"	Naomi Wolf	The New York Aquarium has a new baby walrus. Great, another Brooklyn hipster with a ridiculous moustache.	October 10	9007
7-Eleven and Pizza Hut participate in politics, doctors prescribe Adderall for bad test scores, bears invade America's malls, and Naomi Wolf sheds light on female anatomy.
1,100	TBA	Chrystia Freeland	Scientists have found a turtle that pees from its mouth, or has a penis that looks like a face.	October 11	9008
Joe Biden debates Paul Ryan, Martian Obama rumors surface, Stephen argues with Stephen over Mitt Romney's conservative credentials, and Chrystia Freeland talks "Plutocrats."
1,101	TBA	Evan Thomas	The inventor of the cardboard bicycle says it will change the world, provided that "change" includes never raining again.	October 15	9009
Red Bull sponsors a record sky dive, the European Union receives the Nobel Peace Prize, Florida deals with a marauding monkey, and Evan Thomas details Eisenhower's views on war.
1,102	TBA	Cory Booker	N/A	October 16	9010
CNN enhances debate viewing, Emily Bazelon talks affirmative action, Paul Ryan pretends to volunteer, and Mayor Cory Booker explores party platforms and social media.
1,103	TBA	Tyler Perry	N/A	October 17	9011
Mitt Romney's Benghazi accusations backfire, two-parent households fix gun problems, Congressman Scott DesJarlais flip-flops on abortion, and Tyler Perry talks "Madea."
1,104	TBA	The Killers	N/A	October 18	9012
A squirrel votes for Mitt Romney, a farmer puts candy in cow feed, Stephen reports on the world's only Corn Palace, and The Killers discuss their clean-cut reputation.
1,105	TBA	Donald Sadoway	N/A	October 22	9013
Colin Small trashes voter registrations, CEOs threaten personnel over the election, Andrew Cuomo seeks to decriminalize pot, and Donald Sadoway shares his battery brainchild.
1,106	TBA	John Grisham	N/A	October 23	9014
Mitt Romney's presidential smile wins out, undecided voters skip the debates, Lance Armstrong's doping taints LIVESTRONG, and John Grisham writes about crookedlawyers.
1,107	TBA	Anthony Everitt	Only seven days until Halloween, but I tell my kids it's ten. I get a great deal on costumes.	October 24	9015
Donald Trump wants Barack Obama's passport papers, Fox News rehashes the Benghazi attacks, Richard Mourdock justifies rape pregnancies, and Anthony Everitt talks Rome.
1,108	TBA	Mitch Daniels	Anonymous sources say, Mitt Romney uses spray tan. Those anonymous sources? Anyone with eyes.	October 25	9016
Ovulation cycles sway female voting, Tom Hanks concocts neutral Halloween costumes, and Indiana Governor Mitch Daniels talks about his book, "Keeping The Republic."
1,109	TBA	Lilly Ledbetter	N/A	October 31	9017
Hurricane Sandy wreaks havoc on New Jersey, Mitt Romney hosts a relief rally, Donald Trump cuts Obama some slack, and Lilly Ledbetter explores gender pay discrimination.

=== November ===
No.	"The Wørd"	Guest(s)	Introductory phrase	Original release date	Prod. code
1,110	TBA	David Byrne & St. Vincent	A new report says that Paul Ryan likes to shoot deer with hand guns. And when he finds out who leaked that to the media, that deer is gonna get it.	November 1	9018
Michael Bloomberg issues post-Sandy travel mandates, Mitt Romney sways Billy Graham on Mormonism, and music marvel David Byrne teams up with St. Vincent.
1,111	TBA	Nate Silver	N/A	November 5	9019
Colbert Super PAC inspires Mitt Romney, Sasha Issenberg talks data-driven politics, Joe Scarborough doubts liberal math models, and Nate Silver reviews election statistics.
1,112	TBA	Andrew Sullivan	N/A	November 6	9020
America snubs the nice Romney boy and picks Obama, Andrew Sullivan sheds light on the election, and Joe Donnelly beats Richard Mourdock in Indiana.
1,113	TBA	Doris Kearns Goodwin	**No dialogue. Stephen wore a robe and backwards hat while sulking.**	November 7	9021
Liberals and conservatives taint the election, Bill O'Reilly blames Romney's loss on non-whites, wind turbines affect mental health, and Doris Kearns Goodwin recites history.
1,114	TBA	Rachel Maddow	A nine-year-old boy spent his parents life savings on candy. He shouldn't have paid full price on that hundred thousand dollar bar.	November 8	9022
New York experiences a nor'easter, an Albany strip club claims to sell art, platonic friends learn the scientific truth, and Rachel Maddow talks election night.
1,115	TBA	Ken Burns	N/A	November 12	9023
CIA Director David Petraeus steps down after an affair, Karl Rove faces angry benefactors, Jon Stewart assists Colbert Super PAC, and Ken Burns shares "The Central Park Five."
1,116	TBA	Newt Gingrich	Duke University has developed a working invisibility cloak. Now the Bluedevils quidditch team will be unstoppable.	November 13	9024
The media weighs presidential nominees for 2016, Sonia Sotomayor crushes girlish pipe dreams, and Newt Gingrich admits he guessed wrong about the election.
1,117	TBA	Tony Kushner	An oil painting of Bob Barker is on eBay for 3.5 million dollars. I bid, $1.	November 14	9025
"America Again" offends Canadians, Wall Street chucks its weakest link, Christopher Steiner reviews computer trading, and screenwriter Tony Kushner talks "Lincoln."
1,118	"Stars and Gripes"	Chris Stringer	The President is about to pardon a turkey. What did the turkey know about Benghazi?	November 15	9026
Campbell's promotes soups for millennials, the Petraeus scandal escalates, meth protects against influenza, and Chris Stringer talks primitive humans.
1,119	TBA	Jake Tapper	I'm back and I am better than sometimes.	November 26	9027
Shoppers break Black Friday records, the Supreme Court deliberates copyright law, Pope Benedict XVI modifies the nativity, and Jake Tapper discusses the Afghanistan War.
1,120	TBA	Dolly Parton	N/A	November 27	9028
Police bust a Canadian for lying about Santa, congressional Republicans abandon Grover Norquist, Reihan Salam describes Reagan's tax plan, and Dolly Parton promotes literacy.
1,121	"Sisters Are Doing It To Themselves"	Frank Oz	GM & Apple are teaming up to bring Siri to cars. Or as Siri understood it, M&M and Snapple are teaming up to bring cherries to Mars.	November 28	9029
Powerball sales skyrocket, Fox News explains why women can't get married, Harry Reid tries to curb filibusters, and Frank Oz talks Muppets.
1,122	TBA	Sean Carroll	NASA claims they found ice on Mercury. Well I'll believe that when the closest planet to the sun freezes over.	November 29	9030
America foregoes a nuclear Moon missile, Boeing blocks pension benefits to gay couples, Stephen pushes "America Again," and Sean Carroll explains the Higgs field.

=== December ===
No.	"The Wørd"	Guest(s)	Introductory phrase	Original release date	Prod. code
1,123	"Base Instincts"	Ian McKellen	N/A	December 3	9031
The Report hosts Hobbit Week, safer streets weaken a Republican wedge issue, medical grade pods replace nursing homes, and Sir Ian McKellen prefers Gandalf The Grey.
1,124	TBA	Martin Freeman	N/A	December 4	9032
Hobbit Week continues with Bilbo Baggins, testosterone gels trigger family hair growth, morning sickness socks Kate Middleton, and Martin Freeman talks TV roles and Tolkien.
1,125	"Hire Learning"	Andy Serkis	N/A	December 5	9033
Hobbit Week honors Denny's, the Senate votes down universal disability rights, and Andy Serkis compares "The Lord of the Rings" Gollum to "The Hobbit" Gollum.
1,126	TBA	Peter Jackson	N/A	December 6	9034
Hobbit Week ends, Stephen gets the Madame Tussauds treatment, and Peter Jackson receives clarification on Tolkien lore.
1,127	TBA	Diana Krall	N/A	December 10	9035
Fans lobby for Stephen's Senate appointment, David Petraeus declines a presidential proposal from Roger Ailes, and Diana Krall resists jazz standards.
1,128	TBA	Malcolm Gladwell	It is now legal to carry a concealed weapon in all fifty states. So if you are in one of them, be careful.	December 11	9036
Budget deal talks hit a wall, North Korea unearths a unicorn lair, California's ban on ex-gay therapy meets resistance, and Malcolm Gladwell chats about man's best friend.
1,129	TBA	Mandy Patinkin	N/A	December 12	9037
"America Again" defeats Papa Bear's bestseller, Jeff Bingaman gives Stephen a Senate how-to, Fox News attacks the "9/11 site mosque", and Mandy Patinkin talks national security.
1,130	TBA	Simone Campbell	N/A	December 13	9038
Rockers raise money for Hurricane Sandy victims, Vince Gilligan leaks "Breaking Bad" footage, Colbert Super PAC money finds a home, and Simone Campbell talks social justice.
