= The Rise of Rome =

The Rise of Rome may refer to:

- The Rise of Rome (Livy), the first five books of Livy's History of Rome
- The Rise of Rome (Everitt book), a 2012 book by Anthony Everitt
- Age of Empires: The Rise of Rome, an expansion pack for the 1997 video game Age of Empires
