= List of The Colbert Report episodes (2011) =

- No. of episodes: 160

Release
- Original network: Comedy Central

Season chronology
- ← Previous; 2010 episodes Next → 2012 episodes

This is a list of episodes for The Colbert Report in 2011.

== 2011 ==
=== January ===
No.	"The Wørd"	Guest(s)	Introductory phrase	Original release date	Prod. code
814	"N/A"	Ed Rendell	"This year I will not break my New Year's Resolution. G'OH! My resolution was to break my New Year's Resolution!"	January 3	7001
Stephen believes he lives in a nation of wusses due to a postponed football game, and explores the Spider-Man musical.
815	"N/A"	Ron Paul, David Leonhardt, Geoffrey Canada	"Greece is building a border wall. Man, those Mexicans are persistent!"	January 4	7002
Stephen has a message for America's new Indian overlords in light of Obama's endorsement of the U.N. declaration on the rights of indigenous peoples. He also addresses the value of gold.
816	"N/A"	Atul Gawande	"John Boehner is the new Speaker of the House. Either that or the mahogany podium has learned to talk."	January 5	7003
NewSouth Books needs to do more with its censorship of Huckleberry Finn, and Stephen talks about Reince Priebus.
817	"N/A"	Neil deGrasse Tyson, Ronald A. DePinho	N/A	January 6	7004
Gullible bowel syndrome is treated by a placebo, scientists can cure mouse infertility, and a wild lynx increases the walking speeds of elderly patients. Notable moment - Stephen tries to tape his face and cannot properly handle the tape. Quotes: "I just wanna give a big shout-out to one of our sponsors: Arby's. If I was about to be killed, I would eat it. After I'm dead, I'd like to be sliced paper-thin and served with horsey sauce!"; "Finally a cure for mouse infertility! The species is saved!"; "Oh wow, it has a creamy center. So, Hostess makes our DNA."
818	"N/A"	Fen Montaigne	"The south has been crippled by a winter storm - or as they call it, the weather of northern aggression."	January 10	7005
Mike Fitzpatrick and Pete Sessions miss their swearing into office, but swear in through television, and a difference-maker is interviewed regarding aliens coming to Earth. "Lad Liberty" appears in introduction sequence.
819	"N/A"	Dan Auerbach, Patrick Carney, Ezra Koenig, Chris Hughes	"Myspace slashes its staff in half. Wow! They fired both people?"	January 11	7006
Colbert picks his winners for the 2011 Grammy Awards and Chris Hughes talks about his life since the Obama campaign. Ezra Koenig of Vampire Weekend and the Black Keys make a special appearance in the first segment and compete for Colbert's Grammy vote by listing commercials their songs appear in.
820	"Life, Liberty and the Pursuit of Angriness"	Bernard-Henri Lévy	N/A	January 12	7007
50 Cent makes $8 million on Twitter while Bernard-Henri Levy discusses public intellectualism. Stephen indicates that he believes Americans think of public intellectualizing in the same way as public urination. First usage of "The Wørd" in 2011.
821	"N/A"	Kevin Spacey	N/A	January 13	7008
In his segment "Thought For Food", a red alert is brought to surface regarding the shrinking of 7/11's "Super Big Gulp". Meanwhile, a Doritos ad angers Catholics, Pepsi has made fruit drinkable, and Obama moves Colbert by "doing a great job" speaking at a memorial in Tucson. Actor Kevin Spacey talks about Jack Abramoff, whom Stephen considers a patriot.
822	"Run for Your Life"	Wade Hampton, Sherry Turkle	"Starbucks introduced the new 31 ounce 'trenta', which I believe is Italian for 'kidney failure'."	January 17	7009
Sears offers 50% off mattresses for Martin Luther King Day, and Kmart offers free shipping. Gun control is explored, and Sherry Turkle talks about how technology is alienating.
823	"Disintegration"	Cornel West	"Dick Cheney may need a new heart. I say we waterboard the Wizard of Oz."	January 18	7010
Stephen looks at education reform and assumes Cornel West's book is about Obama joining the circus.
824	"N/A"	Ron Reagan, Jr.	"Joe Lieberman announced he won't run for reelection. In a related story, Steven Seagal removed himself from Oscar contention."	January 19	7011
Stephen gets a present from Afghanistan and talks to Ron Reagan about his memoir.
825	"N/A"	Christine Todd Whitman, Chris Matthews	N/A	January 20	7012
Christine Todd Whitman discusses state budget shortfalls, and Chris Matthews defends JFK's legacy.
826	"Coverage of Denial"	Charlie Rose	"A court has ruled that Rahm Emanuel is not legally allowed to run for mayor of Chicago. Which, in Chicago, I believe means he won."	January 24	7013
House Republicans repeal health care to create new jobs, and Stephen talks to Charlie Rose.
827	"N/A"	Amy Chua	"The state of our union is strong, though I think it may be juicing."	January 25	7014
Stephen covers home appliance safety and talks to Amy Chua about her controversial book.
828	"N/A"	Michael Waldman, Christine Yvette Lewis	N/A	January 26	7015
Michael Waldman rates the State of the Union, and Christine Yvette Lewis fights for domestic workers.
829	"N/A"	Daryl Bem, Brian Greene	"New York is set to break the record of its snowiest month. Also, its yellow-snowiest month."	January 27	7016
Stephen wonders if ESP exists and asks Brian Greene if there is a universe where people buy books.
830	"N/A"	Samer Shehata, Paul Offit	"The Malawi government is making farting illegal. But I say, he who suppressed it, expressed it."	January 31	7017
There's a breakthrough in taser technology, and Dr. Paul Offit discusses the importance of vaccines.

=== February ===
No.	"The Wørd"	Guest(s)	Introductory phrase	Original release date	Prod. code
831	"N/A"	Leslie Dach, Michael Lewis	N/A	February 1	7018
Egyptian protests, the gut brain, Wyngz, Michelle Obama's veggiehad, The Big Short
832	"N/A"	Sean Dorrance Kelly	"For the first time ever, there won't be any cheerleaders at the Super Bowl. What will we watch between concussions?"	February 2	7019
Bing copying Google, Hosni Mubarak supporters punching Anderson Cooper, Christiane Aman-Purr, Henry Cavill as Superman, Big Flats beer, All Things Shining.
833	"N/A"	Jane McGonigal	"I just hit 2 million followers on Twitter, which I believe means Ashton Kutcher has to give me Demi Moore for one night."	February 3	7020
Crisis in Egypt, Bill O'Reilly wonders about the tides, $200 outdoor Super Bowl tickets, Black History Month, Ohio governor John Kasich's all-white cabinet, playing games is productive.
834	"N/A"	LCD Soundsystem	"Arcade Fire won the Grammy for best album yet I set an arcade on fire and all I get is five years for arson."	February 14	7021
Hosni Mubarak steps down onto a pillowy mound of money, and LCD Soundsystem performs.
835	"N/A"	Christiane Amanpour, David Albright	"Watson the Computer is on Jeopardy! this week. Meanwhile, my Speak & Spell keeps beating me at Wheel of Fortune."	February 15	7022
President Twitter Bird will lead Egypt, and David Albright talks about Iran's computer virus.
836	"N/A"	Eric Foner	"The Census says Chicago has shrunk by 200,000 people and yet the voter rolls have grown by a million."	February 16	7023
Rupert Murdoch takes a new approach to journalism, and Eric Foner talks about Abraham Lincoln.
837	"N/A"	H. Jeffrey Leonard	N/A	February 17	7024
Stephen poses for Project, and Jeffrey Leonard calls out big companies' late payment policies.
838	"N/A"	Eugene Jarecki	N/A	February 21	7025
Rick Santorum complains about his Google problem, and Eugene Jarecki dispels the myths of Reagan.
839	"N/A"	Randi Weingarten, Jon Erpenbach, Bing West	"I'm a man of very few words. This..."	February 22	7026
Wisconsin Democrats waddle out of the state, and Bing West discusses the way out of Afghanistan.
840	"N/A"	Stephanie Coontz	"There's a Mad Man cookbook. I can't wait to taste chicken a la cigarette."	February 23	7027
Stephen brings a criminal to justice, and Stephanie Coontz talks about women in the 60s.
841	"N/A"	Glenn Greenwald, Mike Huckabee	N/A	February 24	7028
Aaron Barr threatens WikiLeaks, and Mike Huckabee doesn't believe Obama is a Muslim.
842	"N/A"	Michael Scheuer	"The King's Speech: Best Picture? They didn't even cure him - at the end, he still had that debilitating English accent."	February 28	7029
Stephen's portrait goes up for auction, and Michael Scheuer talks about Osama bin Laden.

=== March ===
No.	"The Wørd"	Guest(s)	Introductory phrase	Original release date	Prod. code
843	"No Country for Old Men"	Evan Osnos	TBA	March 1	7030
Stephen addresses America's elderly and talks to Evan Osnos about the Oscars.
844	"Economic Boom"	Harry Connick Jr.	"Federal authorities declare the Eastern Cougar extinct. Have they checked the appletini night at Hotel Gansevoort?"	March 2	7031
There's a new hope for American manufacturing, and Harry Connick, Jr. won't be tickling the ivories.
845	"N/A"	Mark W. Moffett	N/A	March 3	7032
Features an eleven-minute segment promoting Jimmy Fallon's new ice cream flavor. Guest appearances during the segment include Fallon, Jon Stewart, Ben Cohen, & Jerry Greenfield.
846	"N/A"	Joshua Foer	"Airlines are considering charging for reclining seats. Also, your scrotum now counts as a carry-on bag."	March 7	7033
Stephen examines new questions about Obama's past and asks Joshua Foer where he put his car keys.
847	"N/A"	Dale Bryk, Dan Sinker	N/A	March 8	7034
Congress bans the sale of traditional light bulbs, and Dan Sinker impersonates Rahm Emanuel.
848	"N/A"	Anthony Weiner, David Brooks	"It's time for me to tell you about the birds and the bees: pesticide works on both of them."	March 9	7035
Clarence Thomas may have a conflict of interest, and David Brooks talks about "The Social Animal."
849	"N/A"	Reza Aslan	"Rio's Carnivale festival has ended and Rio's 'go to the doctor to see what I just contracted' festival has just begun."	March 10	7036
Al Qaeda recruits Americans, and Reza Aslan talks about the Islamic-American experience.
850	"N/A"	Simon de Pury, Steve Martin	"Barry Bonds' perjury trial starts today or, as Barry Bonds puts it, no it didn't."	March 21	7037
Stephen's self-portrait goes up for auction, and Steve Martin does some bluegrass.
851	"N/A"	Ayman Mohyeldin	"Fidel Castro now says he resigned five years ago, but his beard is still in power."	March 22	7038
The art world buzzes about Stephen's portrait, and Ayman Mohyeldin talks in the Situation Mosque.
852	"Over-Reactor"	Nathan Myhrvold	N/A	March 23	7039
Simon de Pury dances to Snoop Dogg, and Nathan Myhrvold uses modern scientific methods to cook food.
853	"N/A"	Laurie Garrett, Jody Williams	"Elizabeth Taylor has passed away. I guess I should return this to the jeweler."	March 24	7040
Food prices skyrocket, a cable news feud escalates, and Jody Williams wants to advance equality.
854	"N/A"	Michael Moore	"The inventor of superglue has died. I assume he finally fell off that girder."	March 28	7041
Labor unions fight on, and Stephen stands outside with a bullhorn to interview Michael Moore.
855	"N/A"	Stephen Prothero, Dr. Anthony Fauci	"The Bronx Zoo is still missing its Egyptian Cobra. Airports, be on the lookout for a very skinny man in a trenchcoat buying a one-way ticket to Cairo."	March 29	7042
Stephen questions Obama's plan for Libya and talks infectious diseases with Dr. Anthony Fauci.
856	"N/A"	Trevor Potter, Tim Shriver	N/A	March 30	7043
Stephen practices Rebecca Black's "Friday" and does a PSA for Tim Shriver.
857	"N/A"	Piers Gibbon	"It's baseball's opening day - better luck next year, Mets."	March 31	7044
The Wisconsin anti-union law faces trouble, and Piers Gibbon talks about cannibalism.

=== April ===
No.	"The Wørd"	Guest(s)	Introductory phrase	Original release date	Prod. code
858	"That New-Smell Smell"	Andrew Chaikin	N/A	April 4	7045
Stephen prepares for a world without Glenn Beck, and Andrew Chaikin wants humans to travel to Mars.
859	"N/A"	James Franco	N/A	April 5	7046
Tim Pawlenty raps about pop culture, and James Franco proves he's a Tolkien fan.
860	"N/A"	Hugo Vickers, Sir David Tang	N/A	April 6	7047
Stephen prepares for the royal wedding, and David Tang corrects celebrity rumors.
861	"N/A"	Hugo Vickers, Jeff Greenfield	"America is producing fewer Caucasian babies. Great, I suppose China is beating us at that now too."	April 7	7048
Stephen gets ready for the royal wedding and talks to Jeff Greenfield about alternate histories.
862	"N/A"	Adam Savage & Jamie Hyneman	N/A	April 11	7049
Walgreens offers Pap smears, and Jamie Hyneman and Adam Savage test the blue ice myth.
863	"N/A"	Rick Brookhiser, Ray Kurzweil	"Iceland's penis museum got its first human specimen and its owner wants to point out it's extremely cold up there."	April 12	7050
Mitt Romney throws his hat in the ring, and Ray Kurzweil says man and machine are becoming one.
864	"Buy and Cellulite"	Morgan Spurlock	N/A	April 13	7051
Unilever creates armpit insecurity among women, and Morgan Spurlock addresses product placement.
865	"N/A"	Trevor Potter, Caroline Kennedy	N/A	April 14	7052
Trevor Potter helps Stephen fill out super PAC forms, and Caroline Kennedy recites poetry.
866	"N/A"	Ron Paul	N/A	April 25	7053
In this episode, Stephen recovers from a Catholic bender, and Donald Trump leads in the potential Republican candidate polls. Masturbation cures restless leg syndrome, and Ron Paul criticizes the Federal Reserve.
867	"N/A"	A.C. Grayling	"Social Security checks are going paperless - because if there's one thing seniors are good at, it's online banking."	April 26	7054
The climate change debate continues, and A.C. Grayling writes a secular Bible.
868	"N/A"	Ice-T	"Fatah and Hamas have signed a unity pact: they've agreed to hate the Jews together."	April 27	7055
The new danger in air travel comes with a $25 fee, and Ice-T talks about his memoir.
869	"N/A"	Russ Feingold, Wade Graham	"Put another shrimp on the barbie - I'm in England."	April 28	7056
Stephen travels to England for the royal wedding, and asks Wade Graham about Covent Garden.

=== May ===
No.	"The Wørd"	Guest(s)	Introductory phrase	Original release date	Prod. code
870	"N/A"	Richard Haass, Francis Fukuyama	"Seth Meyers did a great job at the Correspondents' Dinner, but I gotta say this weekend Barack Obama really killed."	May 2	7057
Stephen throws a "We Got Bin Laden" party, and Francis Fukuyama warns of the Chinese threat.
871	"N/A"	Rex Ryan	"Scott Pelley has been named the new CBS Evening News anchor. Personally, I don't think he has the gams for it."	May 3	7058
Stephen covers new details in the hunt for Bin Laden and talks to Rex Ryan for six minutes.
872	"N/A"	Amy Farrell	"The first Republican debate is tomorrow night. Good seats still available...on stage."	May 4	7059
"Atlas Shrugged" comes to the big screen, and Amy Farrell wants to end the persecution of fat people.
873	"N/A"	Bill James	N/A	May 5	7060
Donald Trump applies his wisdom to same-sex marriage, and Bill James discusses true crime.
874	"Autocratic for the People"	Lupe Fiasco	"Animal Kingdom wins the Kentucky Derby. Don't worry plants: you'll get 'em next year."	May 9	7061
Stephen looks at a unique solution to the debt crisis in Michigan, and Lupe Fiasco performs.
875	"N/A"	Geoffrey Rush	N/A	May 10	7062
A billboard predicts the end of the world, and Geoffrey Rush explains why he's not a method actor.
876	"N/A"	Trevor Potter, Eric Greitens	"They got Bin Laden's hand-written diary. Apparently, he thought America was totally stuck-up."	May 11	7063
Stephen receives an unexpected honor, and Eric Greitens talks about being a Navy Seal.
877	"N/A"	Lawrence Wright, John Bradshaw	"Sarah Palin claims she knows all the lyrics to Rapper's Delight. Alaska karaoke bars, you've been warned."	May 12	7064
Stephen warns of a new government intrusion and talks to John Bradshaw about dog behavior.
878	"N/A"	Alison Klayman	N/A	May 16	7065
Stephen files his super PAC request, and Alison Klayman talks about Chinese artist Ai Weiwei.
879	"Enhanced Rejustification"	Amy Kremer	"CNN anchor Don Lemon has come out as gay...but can he find the courage to tell his family he's on CNN?"	May 17	7066
Stephen covers tax breaks for oil companies and talks to Amy Kremer dressed as an American patriot.
880	"N/A"	Austan Goolsbee	"Starbucks is being sued for firing a dwarf...or as Starbucks calls him, a tall."	May 18	7067
Newt Gingrich struggles to stay on message, and Austan Goolsbee talks about the debt ceiling.
881	"N/A"	John Lithgow, Aaron Schock, Kareem Abdul-Jabbar	N/A	May 19	7068
John Lithgow performs Gingrich's press release, and Kareem Abdul-Jabbar discusses the Harlem Rens.
882	"N/A"	Trevor Potter, James B. Stewart	"I just spent seven days on a boat with no showers. I'm not sure if this is a beard or barnacles."	May 31	7069
Stephen wonders if the world ended and lies about reading James Stewart's book.

=== June ===
No.	"The Wørd"	Guest(s)	Introductory phrase	Original release date	Prod. code
883	"N/A"	Robert Kennedy Jr	"I got rid of my beard and let's just say the lack of carpet matches the lack of drapes."	June 1	7070
Stephen examines the Weiner scandal, and Robert F. Kennedy, Jr. makes a mountain out of a molehill.
884	"N/A"	Salman Khan	"Mitt Romney has announced that he is running for president in 2012 and, to save time, he's announced he'll be running again in 2016."	June 2	7071
Congress rejects raising the debt ceiling, and Salman Khan teaches over 53 million students.
885	"N/A"	Werner Herzog	N/A	June 6	7072
Sarah Palin describes Paul Revere's midnight ride, and Werner Herzog talks about cave paintings.
886	"Hear No Evil"	Sugar Ray Leonard	N/A	June 7	7073
Rand Paul identifies terrorists, and Stephen thumb wrestles Sugar Ray Leonard.
887	"N/A"	John Garamendi, Bre Pettis	N/A	June 8	7074
Anthony Weiner captures the manscaping vote, and Bre Pettis print a 3-D copy of Stephen's head.
888	"The Business End"	Tom Ridge	N/A	June 9	7075
Andrew Breitbart shows a photo of Anthony Weiner's penis, and Tom Ridge talks about natural gas.
889	"N/A"	Henry Kissinger	N/A	June 13	7076
Freestyle canoe dancing heats up, and Henry Kissinger discusses America's relationship with China.
890	"N/A"	Janny Scott	"Spider-Man the Musical finally reopens just in time to save New York's struggling hospitals."	June 14	7077
Stephen explores "Sesame Street" corruption and talks to Janny Scott about Barack Obama's mother.
891	"Shock the Vote"	Keith Olbermann	"A 99-year old Oregon man just graduated from college. Ouch. Terrible time to enter the job market."	June 15	7078
Seniors face a shocking new threat, and Keith Olbermann returns to television.
892	"N/A"	Bon Iver	"Eight percent of U.S. kids have food allergies. Luckily, very little of what they eat is technically food."	June 20	7079
Summer Concert Series, Night One. Stephen looks at new developments in technology, and Bon Iver performs.
893	"N/A"	Jack White, Florence & the Machine	N/A	June 21	7080
Summer Concert Series, Night Two. Jack White helps Stephen revive his music career, and Florence and the Machine perform.
894	"The Defining Moment"	Jack White, Talib Kweli	N/A	June 22	7081
Summer Concert Series, Night Three. Stephen comes clean with Jack White, Obama defends actions in Libya, and Talib Kweli performs.
895	"N/A"	Jack White & The Black Belles	N/A	June 23	7082
Summer Concert Series, Night Four. Jack White presents "Charlene II (I'm Over You)," and Stephen performs with the Black Belles.
896	"N/A"	Grover Norquist	"The Supreme Court ruled it's legal to sell violent video games to kids. Get ready for Grand Theft Tetris."	June 27	7083
Ted Nugent writes an Op-ed, and Stephen wants to claim Grover Norquist as a dependent.
897	"Too Big to Nail"	Alexandra Pelosi	"The Pope wrote his first tweet today; he is truly the vessel in which God wastes time."	June 28	7084
The Supreme Court throws out a class action lawsuit against Wal-Mart, and Alexandra Pelosi discusses her documentary on immigrant naturalization in the U.S.
898	"N/A"	Trevor Potter, Gary Sinise	"Every time God closes a door, he opens a window. Clearly, he's not the one paying for air conditioning."	June 29	7085
The FEC makes a decision about Stephen's Super PAC, and Gary Sinise entertains American troops.
899	"N/A"	Timothy Garton Ash	"A French couple has adopted a 265-pound gorilla. And in tomorrow's news: a French couple is mauled by a newly-orphaned gorilla."	June 30	7086
The FEC allows Stephen to form his Super PAC, and Timothy Garton Ash discusses subversive facts.

=== July ===
No.	"The Wørd"	Guest(s)	Introductory phrase	Original release date	Prod. code
900	"N/A"	Hans Beinholtz^{[a]}, Michael Shermer	"A new study has found that men like to cuddle, and another new study shows that men will say anything to get a researcher into bed."	July 11	7087
The natural gas industry tries to counter bad press, and Michael Shermer discusses "Skeptic Magazine."
901	"N/A"	Dan Savage	N/A	July 12	7088
Michele Bachmann signs a controversial pledge, and Dan Savage talks about marriage and monogamy.
902	"N/A"	Naftali Bendavid, David McCullough	"A six-year-old beauty queen has retired. I'm not surprised: she was starting to get crow's dimples."	July 13	7089
The Republican Party has a fresh young face that's only 235 years old, and David McCullough has a new book about Americans in Paris.
903	"N/A"	Jose Antonio Vargas	"Who's got two thumbs and is incredibly bad at gesturing at himself?"	July 14	7090
The Rupert Murdoch scandal deepens, and Jose Antonio Vargas comes out of the border-gay closet.
904	"N/A"	Sean Parnell, Sheila Krumholz, John Prendergast	"Congratulation to the Japanese women's soccer team for rescuing America from the brink of caring about soccer."	July 18	7091
Fox News blows the lid back onto the Murdoch story, and John Prendergast discusses South Sudan.
905	"N/A"	David Carr	N/A	July 19	7092
Newt Gingrich drowns in debt, and David Carr feels like the tallest leprechaun in "Page One."
906	"N/A"	Michael Sandel	N/A	July 20	7093
A pie attack makes Rupert Murdoch sympathetic, Republicans limit who can vote, and Michael Sandel examines the ethical issue of sailor cannibalism.
907	"N/A"	David Eagleman	"You say potato, I say: who are you and why are you saying potato to me?"	July 21	7094
California passes a law requiring public schools to teach gay history, NBC loves breasts, and neuroscientist David Eagleman discusses the secret lives of the brain.
908	"N/A"	Brian Cox	N/A	July 25	7095
The media assumes Norway's native gunman is Muslim, Summer's Eve uses vaginal puppetry to market their product to vaginas, and Brian Cox reveals the mysteries of space.
909	"N/A"	Peter Edelman, Brooke Gladstone	"NASA has found volcanoes on the dark side of the Moon, and they erupt in sync with The Wizard of Oz."	July 26	7096
Herman Cain breaks Stephen's heart, Peter Edelman talks "poors," and Brooke Gladstone reflects on the media's influence.
910	"N/A"	Mary "Missy" Cummings	N/A	July 27	7097
Home-owning vampire Patrick Rodgers turns the tables on Wells Fargo, electric car drivers face a critical deadline, and Missy Cummings develops a new breed of flying robots.
911	"N/A"	Matthew Dowd, Buddy Roemer	N/A	July 28	7098
John McCain enrages Tea Partiers by calling them "Hobbits," and Republican presidential candidate Buddy Roemer won't take special-interest donations.

=== August ===
No.	"The Wørd"	Guest(s)	Introductory phrase	Original release date	Prod. code
912	"With Great Power Comes No Responsibility"	Tony Hsieh	"A new study says colon cleansing can be risky, but I think they just pulled that finding out of their ass."	August 1	7099
Stephen tells the "Billy Goats Gruff" debt ceiling story, an Alabama company turns ashes into bullets, and Zappos' C.E.O. Tony Hsieh talks about delivering happiness.
913	"N/A"	David Leonhardt, Al Hunt	"A woman was arrested turning tricks out of a donut shop: the perfect place to avoid detection by the cops."	August 2	7100
Scandal rocks Newt Gingrich's Twitterverse, David Leonhardt knows how to save America's credit rating, and Al Hunt thinks everyone lost the debt ceiling deal.
914	"N/A"	Robert Wittman	"God said 'Thou shalt have no gods before me', so don't spoil your appetite with Vishnu-poppers."	August 3	7101
A half-Hispanic teenager steals Spider-Man's job, Monopoly gets a makeover, and Robert Wittman solves art crimes.
915	"N/A"	Anthony Bourdain	"Cargill has recalled 36 million pounds of tainted ground turkey. Personally, I don't know why anyone would buy ground turkey taint."	August 4	7102
Wisconsin Democrats get bad absentee ballot applications, Stephen takes over MLB's Twitter feed, and Anthony Bourdain describes the grossest things he's ever eaten.
916	"N/A"	Nassir Ghaemi	N/A	August 8	7103
America's credit rating plummets, Prescott Group has a cheap doomsday solution, and Nassir Ghaemi thinks madness creates first-rate leaders.
917	"Head in the Cloud"	The Cars	"Captain Morgan's ship has been found. If it's anything like the drink, it doesn't know what happened to it either."	August 9	7104
The liberal media's hot-airheads have started indoctrinating America's kids.
918	"N/A"	Jim Martin, Elliott Ackerman	"Chad Ochocinco says he'll live with a fan for three weeks. Wow...those NFL contract negotiations did not go well."	August 10	7105
Father Jim Martin discusses God's job performance, political junkies donate money for a fix, and Elliot Ackerman lets voters directly nominate a president.
919	"N/A"	Gloria Steinem	N/A	August 11	7106
Mitt Romney thinks corporations are people too, Stephen reveals his super PAC ad, and Gloria Steinem discusses gender equality.
920	"N/A"	Ambassador Susan Rice	N/A	August 15	7107
Stephen apologizes to WOI in Des Moines, Michele Bachmann wins the Iowa straw poll, and Ambassador Susan Rice discusses the role of the United Nations.
921	"N/A"	Frank Luntz, STS-135 Astronauts	N/A	August 16	7108
Barack Obama spins "Obamacare," Frank Luntz transforms the Colbert Super PAC, and Atlantis' crewmembers talk about their final space mission.
922	"N/A"	Jeff Bridges	"152 people set the world record for biggest group shower. Afterwards, they set another record for the longest awkward silence."	August 17	7109
Rick Perry hires Colbert Super PAC's treasurer, Rick Santorum puts gay marriage into everyday napkin terms, and Jeff Bridges looks good by having fun.
923	"N/A"	Kevin Mitnick	"It's my last broadcast for two weeks, but I promise to give you one last great show before I go. This!...just roll it."	August 18	7110
America wants a badass president, WOI reports on the "Rick Parry" write-in scandal, and hacker Kevin Mitnick is the ghost in the wires.

=== September ===
No.	"The Wørd"	Guest(s)	Introductory phrase	Original release date	Prod. code
924	"Happy Endings"	Tim Pawlenty	N/A	September 6	7111
People enjoy a story more when they know how it ends, Prescott Group unveils its toning shoes, and Tim Pawlenty explains why he pulled out of the presidential race.
925	"N/A"	Robin Wright	"Texas A&M is joining the SEC. This concludes today's installment of initials I don't understand."	September 7	7112
The TSA makes changes to airport security, controversy surrounds Martin Luther King Jr.'s memorial, and Robin Wright discusses the cultural impact of the Arab Spring.
926	"N/A"	Tom Brokaw	N/A	September 8	7113
The GOP debate drives Stephen to watch MSNBC, Rick Perry calls Social Security a Ponzi scheme, and Tom Brokaw follows the progress of 9/11 victims' family members.
927	"N/A"	Diane Sawyer	N/A	September 12	7114
Stephen reports on an old-school reporter, America profits from grief, and Diane Sawyer discusses "Jacqueline Kennedy: In Her Own Words."
928	"N/A"	Paul Krugman, Al Gore	"Anderson Cooper's daytime talk show started. Either that, or he's reporting from the disaster area known as daytime TV."	September 13	7115
Barack Obama unveils his jobs plan, Paul Krugman discusses the Lesser Depression, and Al Gore focuses on climate reality.
929	"N/A"	Phil Rubio, Michael Moore	N/A	September 14	7116
Fox News objects to Barack Obama's jobs bill binder clip, Stephen unveils his postal solution, and Michael Moore talks about his memoir "Here Comes Trouble."
930	"N/A"	Jimmy Fallon, David Copperfield	"The proof is in the pudding, but good luck finding where I hid the pudding."	September 15	7117
Swiss banking giant UBS reports a $2 billion loss, Jimmy Fallon loves Stephen, and David Copperfield discusses the mind-bending science of perception.
931	"Death and Taxes"	Jeffrey Kluger	N/A	September 20	7118
Barack Obama unveils his deficit reduction plan; the repeal of "don't ask, don't tell" changes everything; and Jeffrey Kluger examines the bond between siblings.
932	"N/A"	Chrystia Freeland, Daniel Yergin	"The Federal Reserve wants to stimulate the economy. Well, then Ben Bernanke's gonna have to show a little leg."	September 21	7119
Reuters' Chrystia Freeland discusses Europe's financial crisis, protestors occupy Wall Street, and Daniel Yergin discusses the world's quest for energy.
933	"N/A"	Jeremy Ben-Ami	N/A	September 22	7120
A defunct satellite threatens the earth, the Marine Corps limits troops to silent farts in Afghanistan, and Jeremy Ben-Ami discusses the Israeli-Palestinian peace process.
935	"I Think, Therefore I Brand"	Radiohead	"Prepare yourselves, Radiohead. You're about to meet Televisionface."	September 26	7121
America reaches a milestone in corporate civil rights, Thom Yorke and Ed O'Brien discuss global warming, and rock legend Radiohead performs. First ever hour-length episode of The Colbert Report.
936	"N/A"	Melinda Gates	N/A	September 27	7122
Rick Perry owns his horrific debate performance, the NFL tightens stadium security, and Melinda Gates works on improving America's public schools.
937	"Labor Chains"	Ken Burns	"Amazon unveiled its new iPad competitor, the Kindle Fire. I'm gonna use mine to order the new iPhone."	September 28	7123
Rick Perry talks immigration, America gets tough on pregnant Mexicans, John Lithgow calls the Atone Phone, and Ken Burns discusses his Prohibition documentary.
938	TBA	Mark Cuban	TBA	September 29	7124
Karl Rove's fundraising takes a turn, Trevor Potter arms Stephen with a 501(c)(4), Kevin Kline hosts The Donating Game, and Mark Cuban talks billionaires.

=== October ===
No.	"The Wørd"	Guest(s)	Introductory phrase	Original release date	Prod. code
939	TBA	Jerome Groopman	TBA	October 3	8001
Rick Perry's hunting camp once bore a racially charged name, Obamacare heads to the Supreme Court, and Jerome Groopman discusses medical decision-making.
940	TBA	John Lithgow	"NBC has cancelled The Playboy Club. Apparently, people just watched it for the articles."	October 4	8002
Rick Davis weighs in on Chris Christie fever, ESPN pulls Hank Williams Jr.'s song, and John Lithgow talks drama.
941	TBA	Black Star	"The Nobel Committee has awarded-I can't believe they didn't last! If they don't make it, nobody can!"	October 5	8003
Herman Cain gives his take on homosexuality, Mexico City proposes two-year marriage licenses, and Black Star performs.
942	TBA	Jason Amerine	"A scientific panel recommended against prostate testing, but my prostate was up all night cramming."	October 6	8004
Sarah Palin bows out of the presidential race, Stephen apologizes to Karl Rove, and Lieutenant Colonel Jason Amerine discusses the early days of the Afghanistan War.
943	"Look Out for the Little Guy"	Harry Belafonte	TBA	October 17	8005
The Occupy Wall Street movement goes global, Stephen unveils Colbert Super PAC's NBA lockout ad, and Harry Belafonte talks political activism.
944	TBA	Steven Pinker	TBA	October 18	8006
Herman Cain may or may not be joking about an electrified border fence, schools take potatoes off their menus, and Steven Pinker discusses the decline of human violence.
945	TBA	Ali Soufan	" The world population will hit 7 billion people by Halloween, so you may want to buy an extra bag of Snickers."	October 19	8007
Herman Cain blames the unemployed, Republican candidates want to end EPA regulations, and Ali Soufan provides an inside look at the war on terror.
946	TBA	Coldplay	"Antidepressant use is up since 1988. Someone should do something about that, but God, it just seems so impossible."	October 20	8008
Libyan rebels kill Muammar al-Gaddafi, Tea Party Nation demands a hiring freeze from its members, and Coldplay perform from "Mylo Xyloto."
947	TBA	Jon Huntsman, Jr.	TBA	October 24	8009
Stephen unveils Colbert Super PAC's message, Frank Luntz conducts a focus group, and GOP presidential candidate Jon Huntsman talks about fixing America.
948	TBA	Susan Saladoff	"Gaddafi will be buried in a secret location that no one can find. Maybe that's where he should've hidden".	October 25	8010
Herman Cain's campaign ad gets buzz, Ben & Jerry's endorses Occupy Wall Street, and Susan Saladoff explores the myth of frivolous lawsuits.
949	TBA	Taylor Branch	"It's the tenth anniversary of the Patriot Act, but what do you get for the government that knows everything?"	October 26	8011
PETA files a lawsuit to free captive whales, immigrant farm workers flee Alabama, and Taylor Branch discusses the multi-billion dollar college sports industry.
950	TBA	Toby Keith	"A Californian doctor was caught selling painkillers out of a Starbucks. Hey, everyone else in Starbucks, now you've finally got a great idea for that screenplay."	October 27	8012
Occupy Wall Street wears out its welcome, Stephen unveils his second NBA lockout Super PAC ad, and Toby Keith performs.
951	TBA	Neil MacGregor	TBA	October 31	8013
Stephen joins Occupy Wall Street, Wisconsin allows concealed weapons in its Capitol, and Neil MacGregor tells the history of the world with 100 objects.

=== November ===
No.	"The Wørd"	Guest(s)	Introductory phrase	Original release date	Prod. code
952	TBA	Yo-Yo Ma	"A new study found that happy people live 35% longer. Yeah, but unhappy people's lives seem longer."	November 1	8014
Herman Cain's sexual harassment controversy unfolds; Stephen returns to Wall Street; and Yo-Yo Ma, Stuart Duncan, Edgar Meyer and Chris Thile perform.
953	"Bite The Hand That Feeds You"	Michael Pollan	"Bank of America will drop its five dollar debit card fee. Of course, this comes with a six dollar fee removal fee."	November 2	8015
Herman Cain discusses the Chinese nuclear threat, the government releases information on Muffingate, and Michael Pollan talks food.
954	TBA	Nathan Wolfe	A new report says that New York City has shrunk by more than 2 square miles. Hey, come on, it's cold outside!"	November 3	8016
Hans Beinholtz hawks Europe to investors, Colbert Super PAC adopts Herman Cain's fundraising strategy, and Nathan Wolfe examines viral pandemics.
955	TBA	Niall Ferguson	TBA	November 7	8017
Make Us Great Again airs its Rick Perry ad, Colbert Super PAC takes on issue advocacy, and Niall Ferguson discusses the end of western dominance.
956	TBA	Seth Meyers	TBA	November 8	8018
Herman Cain holds a press conference to address sexual harassment charges, Stephen saves Christmas, and Seth Meyers talks "Saturday Night Live."
957	"Bully Pulpit"	Father James Martin	"Italian debt threatens to swamp the Eurozone. I knew they shouldn't have offered unlimited breadsticks!"	November 9	8019
Herman Cain blames Democrats for his troubles, Michigan Senate Republicans amend an anti-bullying bill, and Father James Martin explores the role of comedy in religion.
958	TBA	Brian Eno	TBA	November 10	8020
Barack Obama plans to station U.S. troops in Australia, Rick Perry bungles another debate, and Brian Eno sings a cappella with Michael Stipe and Stephen.
959	TBA	Thomas Thwaites	"The new Italian Prime Minister has passed new austerity measures. He's going to cut back to one bunga."	November 14	8021
Michele Bachmann gets an e-mail snub, Bill McKibben opposes construction of the Keystone XL pipeline, and Thomas Thwaites talks toasters.
960	TBA	Elijah Wood	TBA	November 15	8022
The NYPD dismantles Occupy Wall Street, investors accuse Goldline International of theft, and Elijah Wood talks Middle-earth and penguins.
961	TBA	Chris Matthews	"North Korea is opening to tourists. You'll come for the kimchee, you'll stay because you can't leave."	November 16	8023
Newt Gingrich defends his Greek cruise, Ron Paul supporters publish a pin-up calendar, and Chris Matthews discusses John F. Kennedy's elusive heroism.
962	"The 1%"	Susan Orlean	"In honor of Thanksgiving, I'm doing the whole show with my pants unbuttoned."	November 17	8024
People Magazine picks its sexiest man, the congressional super committee eyes veterans' healthcare benefits, and Susan Orlean discusses the life of Rin Tin Tin.
963	TBA	Siddhartha Mukherjee	"A recent study claims women think about sex ten times a day. But I don't buy it; my show is only on four times a day."	November 28	8025
Barack Obama omits God from his online Thanksgiving address, CNN lays off staffers in favor of user-generated content, and Siddhartha Mukherjee researches cancer.
964	TBA	Tinariwen	"Stalin's daughter is dead at the age of 85. Your move, Cindy Hitler."	November 29	8026
Herman Cain rethinks his candidacy, Pope Benedict XVI gets caught breaking the law, and Malian musical group Tinariwen performs.
965	TBA	Stephen Sondheim	TBA	November 30	8027
Newt Gingrich denies lobbying, conservatives bid Barney Frank farewell, and Stephen Sondheim ponders the artist life.

=== December ===
No.	"The Wørd"	Guest(s)	Introductory phrase	Original release date	Prod. code
966	TBA	Richard Branson	TBA	December 1	8028
Senator Lori Klein defends Herman Cain, Bret Baier grills Mitt Romney, and Richard Branson explains why he wants to screw business as usual.
967	TBA	Jimmie Johnson	TBA	December 5	8029
Herman Cain abandons his campaign, William Tapley studies apocalyptic signs, and Jimmie Johnson reveals NASCAR racing details.
968	TBA	The Black Keys	TBA	December 6	8030
Iran claims to have captured an American drone, Donald Trump organizes his own GOP debate, and The Black Keys perform.
969	TBA	David Hallberg	TBA	December 7	8031
Stephen sets the date for his GOP debate, Dick Harpootlian helps Colbert Super PAC with its referendum, and ballet dancer David Hallberg performs.
970	TBA	Jack Abramoff	Vladimir Putin has accused Hillary Clinton of instigating protests in Russia. Why don't they just do it already?	December 8	8032
Rick Perry puts out a controversial ad, doctors perform fecal transplants, and Jack Abramoff exposes the truth about Washington corruption.
971	TBA	Samuel L. Jackson	"Newt Gingrich says he is against gay marriage. That explains why it's the only type of marriage he hasn't tried yet."	December 12	8033
Newt Gingrich alerts America to electromagnetic threats, Norway faces a butter crisis, and Samuel L. Jackson considers Martin Luther King Jr.'s personal life.
972	"Let Them Buy Cake"	Mark Whitaker	"An Italian woman left $13 million to her cat. Well... hello!"	December 13	8034
Donald Trump backs out of his debate, Madison charges protesters for the right to protest, and Mark Whitaker pays tribute to his parents with his memoir.
973	TBA	General Raymond T. Odierno	TBA	December 14	8035
Christine O'Donnell backs Mitt Romney, Michele Bachmann frets over military bestiality, and Ray Odierno celebrates the troops homecoming from Iraq.
974	TBA	Daniel Craig	TBA	December 15	8036
Nat Geo Wild pulls out their lion humping footage and Animal Planet sends honeydew melons to get in on Stephen's debate. Megyn Kelly clarifies that Mitt Romney and Barack Obama are not the same person. Daniel Craig reveals his technique for staying sexy and arm-wrestles Stephen.

== Notes ==
^a Hans Beinholtz is a fictional character played by Erik Frandsen.
