= Piers Gibbon =

British television and radio presenter

- Born: Lincolnshire
- Education: Oxford University
- Occupations: Television presenter, radio host, author
- Gibbon's voice recorded February 2014
- Website: piersgibbon.com

Piers Gibbon is an English television and radio presenter, writer, and self-styled "adventurer".

Gibbon has hosted a number of travel documentaries about indigenous peoples and traditional medicine. He is the author of Tribe: Endangered Peoples of the World (Cassell 2010).

== Career ==
In the early 1990s, Gibbon worked as a business manager, including for public relations firm Lawson Dodd. He left that role to begin his television presenting work. Gibbon then studied human sciences at Oxford University. His thesis, Plant Use in Tribal Societies, became the basis of a documentary film, Jungle Trip, in which he travels to the Peruvian Amazon to drink ayahuasca and to collect a live plant, which he hopes will be accepted as a display specimen at Kew Gardens. He did submit the specimen, but the Gardens were obligated to destroy it, as Gibbon failed to document it properly with the Peruvian authorities.

Jungle Trip aired on Channel 4 in 2001 as an episode of To the Ends of the Earth. The broadcast led to a number of radio show appearances, including a regular spot on Resonance FM. He and David McCandless hosted a radio programme called The Good Drugs Guide, which was nominated for a Sony Award.

=== Jungle Trip ===
In Jungle Trip, Gibbon expresses his desire to try ayahuasca, having read so much about it. He flies to the Amazonian city of Iquitos, where he meets with an American expatriate named Alan Shoemaker. Shoemaker officiates Gibbon's first ayahuasca ceremony, as well as others involving the ingestion of tobacco juice and flogging with nettles.

To continue the quest, the crew employs wilderness guide Richard Fowler, who takes them further afield to experience something of the traditional medicine of the Matsés people. When they arrive, David Fleck (an anthropologist doing fieldwork with the Matsés) serves as translator. With the women and children looking on, the Matsés men administer a tobacco snuff called rapé, which is blown into the nostrils through a hollow bone or other tube. Later, the men capture a frog that, although gentle and calm, secretes protective toxins, which the Matsés collect. After administering the poison through superficial burns, the men hunt and kill an armadillo.

But Gibbon wants to further his experience of ayahuasca. With the assistance of anthropologists David Fleck and Françoise Barbira Freedman, he meets with a healer (or curandero) called Don Guillermo, who in turn refers him to a more powerful healer, Don Demetrio. After the film crew leave, Gibbon stays with Don Demetrio for thirty days of ayahuasca drinking.

Near Don Demetrio's home, Gibbon collected a live plant to send to the Kew Gardens in London. There it was analysed and named for him.

=== The Witch Doctor Will See You Now ===
In each episode of The Witch Doctor Will See You Now (2011), Gibbon escorts two Americans to a different country to try traditional medicines alleged to treat various conditions. His stated aim was to test the healing powers and credibility of people whom Western society sometimes calls "witch doctors".

=== Other ===
Gibbon has been Master of Ceremonies for the University of Warwick graduation ceremonies since July 2022.

== Documentary filmography (as presenter) ==
Show	Channel	Year
Jungle Trip	Channel 4	2001
Tasting History	ITV	2008
Headshrinkers of the Amazon	Channel 5 National Geographic Channel	2009; 2011
Dining with Cannibals; Search for the Living Cannibals	National Geographic Channel	2010
The Witch Doctor Will See You Now	National Geographic Channel; SBS2	2011; 2013
