= Anthony Everitt =

British author (born 1940)

Anthony Everitt (born 31 January 1940) is a British author. He publishes regularly in The Guardian and The Financial Times. He worked in literature and visual arts. He was Secretary-General of the Arts Council of Great Britain. He is a visiting professor in the performing and visual arts at Nottingham Trent University. Everitt is a companion of the Liverpool Institute for Performing Arts and an Honorary Fellow of the Dartington College of Arts.

Everitt has written books about Roman history, amongst which biographies of Augustus, Hadrian and Cicero and a book on The Rise of Rome. He lives in Wivenhoe near Colchester.

Everitt read English literature at the University of Cambridge.

== Books ==
- Everitt, Anthony. Cicero: The Life and Times of Rome's Greatest Politician. Random House, 2001.
- Everitt, Anthony. Augustus: The Life of Rome's First Emperor. Random House, 2006.
- Everitt, Anthony. Hadrian and the Triumph of Rome. Random House, 2009.
- Everitt, Anthony. The Rise of Rome: The Making of the World's Greatest Empire. Random House, 2012.
- Everitt, Anthony and Roddy Ashworth. SPQR: A Roman Miscellany. Head of Zeus, 2015.
- Everitt, Anthony. The Rise of Athens: The Story of the World's Greatest Civilization. Random House, 2016.
- Everitt, Anthony. Alexander the Great: His Life and His Mysterious Death. Random House, 2019.
- Everitt, Anthony and Roddy Ashworth. Nero: Matricide, Music, and Murder in Imperial Rome. Random House, 2022.
