= The Rise of Rome (Everitt book) =

Book by Anthony Everitt

The Rise of Rome: The Making of the World's Greatest Empire
- Author: Anthony Everitt
- Language: English
- Subject: Rise of the Roman Republic and Roman Empire
- Publisher: Random House
- Publication date: 7 August 2012
- Media type: Hardcover
- Pages: 512
- ISBN: 978-1400066636

The Rise of Rome: The Making of the World's Greatest Empire is a book by the British author Anthony Everitt chronicling the rise of the Roman Republic and its evolution into the Roman Empire. It was written partly as a response to Edward Gibbon's The Decline and Fall of the Roman Empire. The book explores the development of Rome to become a world leader, how it managed to achieve dominance over Italy and most of Europe. It answers why and how the Romans achieved this spectacular dominance. The author has an interest in the history of Rome as it can be seen in his previous publications like Hadrian and the Triumph of Rome, Augustus, and Cicero. Like his previous three books, The Rise of Rome: The Making of the World's Greatest Empire tackles the topic of Rome, but from a much broader angle. The author touches on different topics such as citizenship, expansion, and the relationship between the senate and the emperor. It also talks about how Rome was able to transform from a small market town in the hills into a world power. The book was published on August 7, 2012. It was published by Penguin Random House LLC.
