= Resonance FM =

Community radio station in London

Coordinates: 51°30′10″N 0°05′33″W

- London; England
- Broadcast area: Central London
- Frequency: 104.4 MHz
- RDS: RES104.4

Programming
- Format: Community radio, Radio Art

Ownership
- Owner: London Musicians Collective Limited

History
- First air date: June 1998

Links
- Webcast: Webcast
- Website: www.resonancefm.com

Resonance 104.4 FM is a London based non-profit community radio station specialising in the arts run by the London Musicians' Collective (LMC). The station has been called "the best radio station in London" by The Guardian and "the best radio station in the world" by The Village Voice. Resonance is operated by hundreds of volunteer technical and production staff. Its Chief Executive Officer is Peter Lanceley, the Artistic Director is Milo Thesiger-Meacham, and its Chair is the critic K Biswas. Other staff members include Solen Fluzin and Iñaki Ramirez.

Until September 2007, its studios were located on Denmark Street before moving to its second location at 144 Borough High Street, Southwark. The station is now located at 7 Risborough Street, Southwark, and broadcasts to a three-mile (4.8 km) radius on 104.4 MHz FM from a transmitter on the roof of Guy's Hospital at London Bridge. Its schedule includes nearly 100 shows catering to many sub-communities of the London area on a wide variety of subjects including a multitude of musical genres, local and foreign current affairs and subjects of local interest. Noted for its policy of giving broadcasters free rein of their creative outlet, it has been described by Time Out as "brilliantly eccentric". The station receives funding grants from Arts Council England.

== Ethos ==
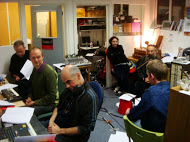
Resonance Radio Orchestra performing Dr Jekyll and Mr Hyde.

The station describes itself as "the world's first radio art station" which aims to provide a radical alternative to mainstream broadcasting. Resonance 104.4 FM features programmes made by musicians, artists and critics who represent the diversity of London’s arts scenes, with regular weekly contributions from nearly two hundred musicians, artists, thinkers, critics, activists and instigators; plus numerous unique broadcasts by artists on the weekday "Clear Spot".

The station presents material ranging from a programme presented by the staff of the experimental music magazine The Wire to Calling All Pensioners, which aims to inform the elderly about local events and benefits entitlement. Live music sessions are featured on shows such as Hello Goodbye, You Are Hear, Hooting Yard on the Air, and Glass Shrimp. Other shows include foreign-language programmes aimed at communities in London that are not served by other broadcasters.

In addition to locally produced programming, Resonance is a member of Radia and a rebroadcaster of American news program Democracy Now!. Resonance FM has received a Sony Award nomination for The Good Drugs Guide, a documentary series presented by Piers Gibbon and David McCandless. The station has been profiled in the pages of The Guardian, The Independent on Sunday, The Daily Telegraph and the Morning Star amongst others.

In 2006 the station was nominated for "The Community Award" by the Sony Radio Academy Awards, but has won the Radio Academy Nations and Regions Award for London for three consecutive years between 2009 and 2011 Station manager Ed Baxter was nominated for "Programmer of the Year" by the Sony Radio Academy Awards in 2010.

== History ==
The London Musicians' Collective originally put together a four-week programme of radio art as part of 1998's Meltdown festival at the South Bank Centre, curated by John Peel. The station operated from the Royal Festival Hall on a month-long restricted service licence on 107.3 FM.

Phil England, an organiser of the original broadcast, described the origins of the station in a text written to accompany the printed programme. The aim, he wrote, was "to raise the specter of radio art in a country where the notion has no common currency".

After a four-year hiatus, the station returned on 1 May 2002 as part of the Ofcom Access Radio Pilot Scheme from studios on Denmark Street in the Soho area of London's West End.

Resonance was awarded a five-year Community Radio licence in December 2005, enabling the station to broadcast 24/7. Ofcom extended the station's FM broadcasting licence in July 2010.

Resonance FM resumed scheduled broadcasting in September 2007 after a short hiatus whilst moving into a new studio building on Borough High Street, Southwark; a short walk from the area where they launched in 1998.

In 2011, Resonance presented a six-week exhibit at the Raven Row Gallery Exhibit in East London. The exhibition theme was the relation of sound to art, and included work from Max Eastley and Takehisa Kosugi.

Between 2022 and 2024, Resonance won 'Network of the Year' an unprecedented three times in a row at the Audio Production Awards.

== Broadcasting ==
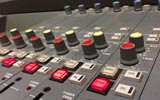
Engineer broadcast desk

The station is broadcast from a transmitter on the roof of Guy's Hospital at London Bridge on 104.4 MHz FM. The transmission power is low compared with London's main radio stations due to the terms of its community radio licence. It can be received throughout central London but does not cover the whole Greater London area. Interference from local pirate radio stations, particularly at weekends, has been and is a problem in some areas. It is also broadcast on DAB digital radio as part of the U.DAB local multiplex covering north and central London. It can also be streamed from the station's web site. Resonance uploads every show to its Mixcloud account throughout each day.

A second station, Resonance Extra, is broadcast on DAB and online only. This is also carried on several of the local DAB multiplexes outside of London.

== Funding ==
The station receives funding grants from Arts Council England as part of the national portfolio funding programme, which began in 2012. The grant for 2012–2013 was £160,000; 2013–2014 £163,680; 2014–2015 £167,936.
