= Primetime Emmy Award for Outstanding Directing for a Variety Series =

Television award category

Primetime Emmy Award for Outstanding Directing for Variety Series
- Awarded for: Outstanding Directing for Variety Series
- Country: United States
- Presented by: Academy of Television Arts & Sciences
- Currently held by: Yvonne De Mare, The Late Show with Stephen Colbert (2026)
- Website: emmys.com

The Primetime Emmy Award for Outstanding Directing for Variety Series is awarded to one television series each year. After being grouped together for decades as Outstanding Directing for Variety or Music Program, categories were divided for series and Outstanding Directing for a Variety Special in 2009.

In the following list, the first titles listed in gold are the winners; those not in gold are nominees, which are listed in alphabetical order. The years given are those in which the ceremonies took place:

== Winners and nominations ==
=== 1970s ===
Year	Program	Episode	Nominee(s)	Network
Outstanding Directorial Achievement in Variety, Comedy or Music
1970
1970	Kraft Music Hall	"The Sound of Burt Bacharach"	Dwight A. Hemion	NBC
1970	New York Philharmonic Young People's Concerts	"Berlioz Takes a Trip"	Roger Englander	CBS
1970	The Second Bill Cosby Special		Seymour Berns	NBC
Outstanding Directing for a Comedy-Variety or Music Series
1971
1971	Rowan & Martin's Laugh-In	"Orson Welles"	Mark Warren	NBC
1971	The Andy Williams Show	"Christmas Show"	Art Fisher	NBC
1971	The Flip Wilson Show	"David Frost, James Brown and The Muppets"	Tim Kiley	NBC
1972
1972	The Sonny & Cher Comedy Hour	"Tony Randall"	Art Fisher	CBS
1972	The Carol Burnett Show	"Carol Channing and Steve Lawrence"	Dave Powers	CBS
1972	The Flip Wilson Show	"Petula Clark and Redd Foxx"	Tim Kiley	NBC
1973
1973	The Julie Andrews Hour	"Lisa Doolittle and Mary Poppins"	Bill Davis	ABC
1973	The Flip Wilson Show	"Roberta Flack and Burt Reynolds"	Tim Kiley	NBC
1973	The Sonny and Cher Comedy Hour	"Mike Connors"	Art Fisher	CBS
1974
1974	The Carol Burnett Show	"The Australia Show"	Dave Powers	CBS
1974	In Concert	"Cat Stevens"	Joshua White	ABC
1974	The Sonny and Cher Comedy Hour	"Ken Berry and George Foreman"	Art Fisher	CBS
1975
1975	The Carol Burnett Show	"Alan Alda"	Dave Powers	CBS
1975	Cher	"Bette Midler, Flip Wilson and Elton John"	Art Fisher	CBS
1976
1976	Saturday Night Live	"Paul Simon"	Dave Wilson	NBC
1976	The Carol Burnett Show	"Maggie Smith"	Dave Powers	CBS
1976	The Sonny and Cher Show	"Premiere"	Tim Kiley	CBS
1977
1977	The Carol Burnett Show	"Eydie Gormé"	Dave Powers	CBS
1977	Saturday Night Live	"Paul Simon"	Dave Wilson	NBC
1977	Van Dyke and Company	"John Denver"	John Moffitt	NBC
1978
1978	The Carol Burnett Show	"Steve Martin and Betty White"	Dave Powers	CBS
1978	The Muppet Show	"Elton John"	Peter Harris	Syndicated
1978	The Richard Pryor Show	"Paula Kelly"	John Moffitt	NBC
1978	Saturday Night Live	"Steve Martin"	Dave Wilson	NBC
1978	Shields and Yarnell	"John Aylesworth"	Steve Binder	CBS
Outstanding Directing in a Comedy or Comedy-Variety or Music Series
1979 (Note: In 1979, there were no variety programs nominated for the comedy directing award.)
1979	Barney Miller	"The Harris Incident"	Noam Pitlik	ABC
1979	All in the Family	"California, Here We Are, Part 2"	Paul Bogart	CBS
1979	M*A*S*H	"Dear Sis"	Alan Alda	CBS
1979	M*A*S*H	"Point of View"	Charles S. Dubin	CBS
1979	Soap	"Episode 27"	Jay Sandrich	ABC

=== 1980s ===
Year	Program	Episode	Nominee(s)	Network
1980	Outstanding Directing for a Variety, Music or Comedy Program			
1980	Baryshnikov on Broadway		Dwight Hemion	ABC
1980	The Big Show	"Mariette Hartley and Dean Martin"	Steve Binder	NBC
1980	John Denver and the Muppets: A Christmas Together		Tony Charmoli	ABC
1980	The Muppet Show	"Liza Minnelli"	Peter Harris	Syndicated
1981
1981	The Kennedy Center Honors: A Celebration of the Performing Arts		Don Mischer	CBS
1981	The 53rd Annual Academy Awards		Marty Pasetta	ABC
1981	Barbara Mandrell and the Mandrell Sisters	"Dolly Parton and John Schneider"	Bob Henry	NBC
1981	Linda in Wonderland		Dwight Hemion	CBS
1981	Nureyev and the Joffrey Ballet in Tribute to Nijinsky (Great Performances)		Emile Ardolino	PBS
1981	Sylvia Fine Kaye's Musical Comedy Tonight II		Tony Charmoli	PBS
1982
1982	Goldie and Kids... Listen to Us		Dwight Hemion	ABC
1982	The 54th Annual Academy Awards		Marty Pasetta	ABC
1982	Baryshnikov in Hollywood		Don Mischer	CBS
1982	Live from Lincoln Center: An Evening with Danny Kaye		Robert Scheerer	PBS
1982	Night of 100 Stars		Clark Jones	ABC
1983
1983	Sheena Easton... Act One		Dwight Hemion	NBC
1983	The 55th Annual Academy Awards		Marty Pasetta	ABC
1983	Lincoln Center Special — Stravinsky and Balanchine: A Genius Has a Birthday!		Emile Ardolino	PBS
1983	Live from Lincoln Center: Zubin Mehta Conducts Beethoven's Ninth with the New York Philharmonic		Kirk Browning	PBS
1983	Motown 25: Yesterday, Today, Forever		Don Mischer	NBC
1983	SCTV Network	"The Energy Ball" / "Sweeps Week Show"	John Blanchard and John Bell	NBC
1984
1984	Here's Television Entertainment		Dwight Hemion	NBC
1984	Burnett "Discovers" Domingo		Marty Pasetta	CBS
1984	The 6th Annual Kennedy Center Honors		Don Mischer	CBS
1984	The 1984 Tony Awards		Clark Jones	CBS
1985
1985	Sweeney Todd (Great Performances)		Terry Hughes	PBS
1985	Late Night with David Letterman	"3rd Anniversary Special"	Hal Gurnee	NBC
1985	Motown Returns to the Apollo		Don Mischer	PBS
1985	Night of 100 Stars II		Waris Hussein	ABC
1986
1986	Copacabana		Waris Hussein	CBS
1986	The 58th Annual Academy Awards		Marty Pasetta	ABC
1986	The Gospel at Colonus (Great Performances)		Kirk Browning	PBS
1986	Neil Diamond... Hello Again		Dwight Hemion	CBS
1987
1987	The Kennedy Center Honors		Don Mischer	CBS
1987	Late Night with David Letterman	"5th Anniversary Special"	Hal Gurnee	NBC
1987	Liberty Weekend: Opening Ceremonies		Dwight Hemion	ABC
1987	The 41st Annual Tony Awards		Walter C. Miller	CBS
1987	The Tracey Ullman Show	"Meg and Tina in August" / "Pre-School" / "Golf"	Ted Bessell and Stuart Margolin	Fox
1988
1988	Celebrating Gershwin (Great Performances)		Patricia Birch and Humphrey Burton	PBS
1988	Irving Berlin's 100th Birthday Celebration		Walter C. Miller	CBS
1988	Late Night with David Letterman	"6th Anniversary Special"	Hal Gurnee	NBC
1988	The Smothers Brothers Comedy Hour: The 20th Reunion		David Grossman	CBS
1989
1989	The Jim Henson Hour	"Dog City"	Jim Henson	NBC
1989	Dance in America: Gregory Hines — Tap Dance in America (Great Performances)		Don Mischer	PBS
1989	The Debbie Allen Special		Debbie Allen	ABC
1989	Late Night with David Letterman	"In Chicago"	Hal Gurnee	NBC
1989	The Tracey Ullman Show	"D.U.I." / "Family Therapy" / "9 Minutes & 52 Seconds Over Tokyo" / "Conjugal Visit"	Ted Bessell	Fox

=== 1990s ===
Year	Program	Episode	Nominee(s)	Network
1990
1990	The Kennedy Center Honors		Dwight Hemion	CBS
1990	The 62nd Annual Academy Awards	"100 Years at the Movies" (segment)	Chuck Workman	ABC
1990	Billy Crystal: Midnight Train to Moscow		Paul Flaherty	HBO
1990	The Jim Henson Hour	"The Song of the Cloud Forest"	Jim Henson	NBC
1990	Sammy Davis Jr.'s 60th Anniversary Celebration		Jeff Margolis	ABC
1991
1991	Late Night with David Letterman	"1425"	Hal Gurnee	NBC
1991	The 63rd Annual Academy Awards		Jeff Margolis	ABC
1991	The Kennedy Center Honors		Dwight Hemion	CBS
1992
1992	Unforgettable... with Love: Natalie Cole Sings the Songs of Nat King Cole (Great Performances)		Patricia Birch	PBS
1992	The 64th Annual Academy Awards		Jeff Margolis	ABC
1992	Late Night with David Letterman	"10th Anniversary Special"	Hal Gurnee	NBC
1992	The Tonight Show Starring Johnny Carson		Bobby Quinn	NBC
1992	The 45th Annual Tony Awards		Walter C. Miller	CBS
1993
1993	The 1992 Tony Awards		Walter C. Miller	CBS
1993	The 65th Annual Academy Awards		Jeff Margolis	ABC
1993	Black and Blue (Great Performances)		Robert Altman	PBS
1993	Late Night with David Letterman	"1723"	Hal Gurnee	NBC
1994
1994	The Tony Awards		Walter C. Miller	CBS
1994	The 66th Annual Academy Awards		Jeff Margolis	ABC
1994	Late Show with David Letterman	"160"	Hal Gurnee	CBS
1994	Saturday Night Live		Dave Wilson	NBC
1994	The Tonight Show with Jay Leno	"463"	Ellen Brown	NBC
1994	Tracey Ullman Takes On New York		Don Scardino	HBO
1995
1995	The 67th Annual Academy Awards		Jeff Margolis	ABC
1995	Barbra Streisand: The Concert		Barbra Streisand and Dwight Hemion	HBO
1995	The Kennedy Center Honors		Louis J. Horvitz	CBS
1995	Late Show with David Letterman	"384"	Hal Gurnee	CBS
1995	The Tonight Show with Jay Leno	"541"	Ellen Brown	NBC
1996
1996	The Kennedy Center Honors		Louis J. Horvitz	CBS
1996	The 68th Annual Academy Awards		Jeff Margolis	ABC
1996	Late Show with David Letterman	"503"	Jerry Foley	CBS
1996	Marsalis on Music	"Sousa to Satchmo"	Michael Lindsay-Hogg	PBS
1996	The Tonight Show with Jay Leno	"914"	Ellen Brown	NBC
1997
1997	Centennial Olympic Games: Opening Ceremonies		Don Mischer	NBC
1997	The 69th Annual Academy Awards		Louis J. Horvitz	ABC
1997	Bette Midler: Diva Las Vegas		Marty Callner	HBO
1997	The Tonight Show with Jay Leno	"1062"	Ellen Brown	NBC
1997	Tracey Takes On...	"1976"	Thomas Schlamme	HBO
1998
1998	The 70th Annual Academy Awards		Louis J. Horvitz	ABC
1998	Fleetwood Mac: The Dance		Bruce Gowers	MTV
1998	Garth: Live from Central Park		Marty Callner	HBO
1998	Rodgers & Hammerstein's Cinderella		Robert Iscove	ABC
1998	Stomp Out Loud		Luke Cresswell and Steve McNicholas	HBO
1998	Tracey Takes On...	"Smoking"	Don Scardino	HBO
1999
1999	The 1998 Tony Awards		Paul Miller	CBS
1999	The 41st Annual Grammy Awards		Walter C. Miller	CBS
1999	The Kennedy Center Honors		Louis J. Horvitz	CBS
1999	Saturday Night Live	"Host: Jennifer Love Hewitt"	Beth McCarthy-Miller	NBC
1999	The Tonight Show with Jay Leno	"1613"	Ellen Brown	NBC

=== 2000s ===
Year	Program	Episode	Nominee(s)	Network
2000
2000	The 72nd Annual Academy Awards		Louis J. Horvitz	ABC
2000	Chris Rock: Bigger & Blacker		Keith Truesdell	HBO
2000	The Gershwins' "Crazy for You" (Great Performances)		Matthew Diamond	PBS
2000	Late Show with David Letterman	"1294"	Jerry Foley	CBS
2000	Saturday Night Live: The 25th Anniversary Special		Beth McCarthy-Miller	NBC
2000	The Tonight Show with Jay Leno	"1770"	Ellen Brown	NBC
2001
2001	Cirque Du Soleil's Dralion		David Mallet	Bravo
2001	The 73rd Annual Academy Awards		Louis J. Horvitz	ABC
2001	Bruce Springsteen & The E Street Band: Live in New York City		Chris Hilson	HBO
2001	Late Show with David Letterman	"1527"	Jerry Foley	CBS
2001	The 54th Annual Tony Awards		Paul Miller	CBS
2002
2002	Opening Ceremony Salt Lake 2002 Olympic Winter Games		Bucky Gunts, Ron de Moraes and Kenny Ortega	NBC
2002	The 74th Annual Academy Awards		Louis J. Horvitz	ABC
2002	America: A Tribute to Heroes		Joel Gallen and Beth McCarthy-Miller	(Note: America: A Tribute to Heroes was simulcast live on 35 network and cable outlets. The Emmys listed no individual network with this nomination.)
2002	From Broadway: Fosse (Great Performances)		Matthew Diamond	PBS
2002	Late Show with David Letterman		Jerry Foley	CBS
2003
2003	The 56th Annual Tony Awards		Glenn Weiss	CBS
2003	The 75th Annual Academy Awards		Louis J. Horvitz	ABC
2003	Bruce Springsteen & The E Street Band: Live in Barcelona		Chris Hilson	CBS
2003	Late Show with David Letterman	"1876"	Jerry Foley	CBS
2003	Saturday Night Live	"Host: Christopher Walken"	Beth McCarthy-Miller	NBC
2004
2004	The 76th Annual Academy Awards		Louis J. Horvitz	ABC
2004	Bill Maher: Victory Begins at Home		John Moffitt	HBO
2004	Chappelle's Show	"204"	Neal Brennan, Andre Allen and Scott Vincent	Comedy Central
2004	The Daily Show with Jon Stewart	"8086"	Chuck O'Neil	Comedy Central
2004	Elaine Stritch: At Liberty		Andy Picheta, Nick Doob, Chris Hegedus and D.A. Pennebaker	HBO
2004	Late Show with David Letterman	"2170"	Jerry Foley	CBS
2005
2005	The Games of the XXVIII Olympiad - Opening Ceremony		Bucky Gunts	NBC
2005	The 77th Annual Academy Awards		Louis J. Horvitz	ABC
2005	Da Ali G Show	"Rekognize"	James Bobin	HBO
2005	The Daily Show with Jon Stewart	"9010"	Chuck O'Neil	Comedy Central
2005	Late Show with David Letterman	"2269"	Jerry Foley	CBS
2006
2006	The 78th Annual Academy Awards		Louis J. Horvitz	ABC
2006	American Idol	"Finale"	Bruce Gowers	Fox
2006	The Colbert Report	"110"	Jim Hoskinson	Comedy Central
2006	The Daily Show with Jon Stewart	"10140"	Chuck O'Neil	Comedy Central
2006	Saturday Night Live	"Host: Steve Martin"	Beth McCarthy-Miller	NBC
2007
2007	Tony Bennett: An American Classic		Rob Marshall	NBC
2007	American Idol	"The Final Two"	Bruce Gowers	Fox
2007	The Colbert Report	"2161"	Jim Hoskinson	Comedy Central
2007	The Daily Show with Jon Stewart	"12061"	Chuck O'Neil	Comedy Central
2007	Saturday Night Live	"Host: Alec Baldwin"	Don Roy King	NBC
2008
2008	The 80th Annual Academy Awards		Louis J. Horvitz	ABC
2008	The Colbert Report	"4051"	Jim Hoskinson	Comedy Central
2008	Company (Great Performances)		Lonny Price	PBS
2008	The Daily Show with Jon Stewart	"13050"	Chuck O'Neil	Comedy Central
2008	Saturday Night Live	"Host: Tina Fey"	Don Roy King	NBC
2009	Outstanding Directing for a Variety Series			
2009	American Idol	"833 (The Final Three)"	Bruce Gowers	Fox
2009	The Colbert Report	"4159"	Jim Hoskinson	Comedy Central
2009	The Daily Show with Jon Stewart	"13107"	Chuck O'Neil	Comedy Central
2009	Late Show with David Letterman	"2932"	Jerry Foley	CBS
2009	Real Time with Bill Maher	"705"	Hal Grant	HBO
2009	Saturday Night Live	"Host: Justin Timberlake"	Don Roy King	NBC

=== 2010s ===
Year	Program	Episode	Nominee(s)	Network
2010	Saturday Night Live	"Host: Betty White"	Don Roy King	NBC
2010	The Colbert Report	"5076 (in Iraq)"	Jim Hoskinson	Comedy Central
2010	The Daily Show with Jon Stewart	"15054"	Chuck O'Neil	Comedy Central
2010	Late Show with David Letterman	"3289"	Jerry Foley	CBS
2010	The Tonight Show with Conan O'Brien	"146"	Allan Kartun	NBC
2011	Saturday Night Live	"Host: Justin Timberlake"	Don Roy King	NBC
2011	American Idol	"1024/1025A"	Gregg Gelfand	Fox
2011	The Colbert Report	"6112"	Jim Hoskinson	Comedy Central
2011	The Daily Show with Jon Stewart	"16048"	Chuck O'Neil	Comedy Central
2011	Late Show with David Letterman	"3333"	Jerry Foley	CBS
2012	Saturday Night Live	"Host: Mick Jagger"	Don Roy King	NBC
2012	The Colbert Report	"7121A"	Jim Hoskinson	Comedy Central
2012	The Daily Show with Jon Stewart	"17087"	Chuck O'Neil	Comedy Central
2012	Late Show with David Letterman	"3602"	Jerry Foley	CBS
2012	Portlandia	"One Moore Episode"	Jonathan Krisel	IFC
2013	Saturday Night Live	"Host: Justin Timberlake"	Don Roy King	NBC
2013	The Colbert Report	"8131"	Jim Hoskinson	Comedy Central
2013	The Daily Show with Jon Stewart	"17153"	Chuck O'Neil	Comedy Central
2013	Jimmy Kimmel Live!	"13-1810"	Andy Fisher	ABC
2013	Late Show with David Letterman	"3749"	Jerry Foley	CBS
2013	Portlandia	"Alexandra"	Jonathan Krisel	IFC
2014	Saturday Night Live	"Host: Jimmy Fallon"	Don Roy King	NBC
2014	The Colbert Report	"9135"	Jim Hoskinson	Comedy Central
2014	The Daily Show with Jon Stewart	"18153"	Chuck O'Neil	Comedy Central
2014	Portlandia	"Getting Away"	Jonathan Krisel	IFC
2014	The Tonight Show Starring Jimmy Fallon	"Episode 1 (Will Smith/U2)"	Dave Diomedi	NBC
2015	The Daily Show with Jon Stewart	"20103"	Chuck O'Neil	Comedy Central
2015	The Colbert Report	"11040"	Jim Hoskinson	Comedy Central
2015	Inside Amy Schumer	"12 Angry Men Inside Amy Schumer"	Amy Schumer and Ryan McFaul	Comedy Central
2015	Late Show with David Letterman	"4214"	Jerry Foley	CBS
2015	The Tonight Show Starring Jimmy Fallon	"203"	Dave Diomedi	NBC
2016
2016	Inside Amy Schumer	"Madonna/Whore"	Ryan McFaul	Comedy Central
2016	Last Week Tonight with John Oliver	"303"	Paul Pennolino	HBO
2016	The Late Late Show with James Corden	"Post-Super Bowl Episode"	Tim Mancinelli	CBS
2016	Saturday Night Live	"Host: Tina Fey & Amy Poehler"	Don Roy King	NBC
2016	The Tonight Show Starring Jimmy Fallon	"325"	Dave Diomedi	NBC
2017
2017	Saturday Night Live	"Host: Jimmy Fallon"	Don Roy King	NBC
2017	Drunk History	"Hamilton"	Derek Waters and Jeremy Konner	Comedy Central
2017	Jimmy Kimmel Live!	"The (RED) Show"	Andy Fisher	ABC
2017	Last Week Tonight with John Oliver	"Multi-Level Marketing"	Paul Pennolino	HBO
2017	The Late Show with Stephen Colbert	"0179"	Jim Hoskinson	CBS
2018
2018	Saturday Night Live	"Host: Donald Glover"	Don Roy King	NBC
2018	Full Frontal with Samantha Bee	"2061"	Andre Allen	TBS
2018	Last Week Tonight with John Oliver	"421"	Paul Pennolino	HBO
2018	The Late Late Show with James Corden	"0416"	Tim Mancinelli	CBS
2018	The Late Show with Stephen Colbert	"438"	Jim Hoskinson	CBS
2018	Portlandia	"Riot Spray"	Carrie Brownstein	IFC
2019
2019	Saturday Night Live	"Host: Adam Sandler"	Don Roy King	NBC
2019	Documentary Now!	"Waiting for the Artist"	Alex Buono and Rhys Thomas	IFC
2019	Drunk History	"Are You Afraid of the Drunk?"	Derek Waters	Comedy Central
2019	Last Week Tonight with John Oliver	"Psychics"	Paul Pennolino	HBO
2019	The Late Show with Stephen Colbert	"Live Midterm Election Show"	Jim Hoskinson	CBS
2019	Who Is America?	"Episode 102"	Sacha Baron Cohen, Nathan Fielder, Daniel Gray Longino and Dan Mazer	Showtime

=== 2020s ===
Year	Program	Episode	Nominee(s)	Network
2020
2020	Saturday Night Live	"Host: Eddie Murphy"	Don Roy King	NBC
2020	A Black Lady Sketch Show	"Born at Night, But Not Last Night"	Dime Davis	HBO
2020	The Daily Show with Trevor Noah	"Dr. Fauci Answers Trevor's Questions About Coronavirus"	David Paul Meyer	Comedy Central
2020	Last Week Tonight with John Oliver	"Episode 629"	Paul Pennolino and Christopher Werner	HBO
2020	The Late Show with Stephen Colbert	"Live Show; Chris Christie; Nathaniel Rateliff"	Jim Hoskinson	CBS
2020	Tiffany Haddish Presents: They Ready	"Flame Monroe"	Linda Mendoza	Netflix
2021
2021	Saturday Night Live	"Host: Dave Chappelle"	Don Roy King	NBC
2021	Last Week Tonight with John Oliver	"Trump & Election Results / F*ck 2020"	Christopher Werner	HBO
2021	Late Night with Seth Meyers	"Episode 1085a"	Alexander J. Vietmeier	NBC
2021	The Late Show with Stephen Colbert	"Live Show Following Capitol Insurrection; Senator Amy Klobuchar, Rep. Adam Kinzinger, Performance by Jamila Woods"	Jim Hoskinson	CBS
2021	Real Time with Bill Maher	"Episode 1835"	Paul G. Casey	HBO
2022
2022	A Black Lady Sketch Show	"Save My Edges, I'm a Donor!"	Bridget Stokes	HBO
2022	Last Week Tonight with John Oliver	"Union Busting"	Paul Pennolino and Christopher Werner	HBO
2022	Late Night with Seth Meyers	"Episode 1252"	Alexander J. Vietmeier	NBC
2022	The Late Show with Stephen Colbert	"Artistic Musical Performance by Chance the Rapper; Monologue: Ukraine & Russian War, January 6 Committee Evidence on Trump & Donald Jr.; Guest Beanie Feldstein"	Jim Hoskinson	CBS
2022	Saturday Night Live	"Host: Billie Eilish"	Don Roy King and Liz Patrick	NBC
2023
2023	Saturday Night Live	"Co-Hosts: Steve Martin & Martin Short"	Liz Patrick	NBC
2023	Jimmy Kimmel Live!	"20th Anniversary Special"	Andy Fisher	ABC
2023	Last Week Tonight with John Oliver	"Afghanistan"	Paul Pennolino	HBO
2023	The Late Show with Stephen Colbert	"John Oliver; Broadway Cast of the Lion King"	Jim Hoskinson	CBS
2023	The Problem with Jon Stewart	"Chaos, Law, and Order"	André Allen	Apple TV+
2024
2024	Saturday Night Live	"Host: Ryan Gosling"	Liz Patrick	NBC
2024	The Daily Show	"Jon Stewart Returns to The Daily Show"	David Paul Meyer	Comedy Central
2024	Jimmy Kimmel Live!	"Trump Still Mad About Oscars Joke and Thinks Jimmy is Al Pacino, Chris Stapleton's Ballad for John Stamos, Guest Rob McElhenney & The Return of Our Outdoor Stage!"	Andy Fisher	ABC
2024	The Late Show with Stephen Colbert	"December 21, 2023: GOP Wants Biden Kicked Off Ballot, Bankrupt Rudy Hawks Supplements, Elf on the Shelf for Parents; Meanwhile; Anderson Cooper & Andy Cohen; Louis Cato and The Late Show Band"	Jim Hoskinson	CBS
2025
2025	The Late Show with Stephen Colbert	"David Oyelowo, Finn Wolfhard, Special Appearance by Alan Cumming, Performance by Ok Go"	Jim Hoskinson	CBS
2025	The Daily Show	"Jon Stewart Delivers a Mug-Smashing Take on Musk's DOGE"	David Paul Meyer	Comedy Central
2025	Jimmy Kimmel Live!	"Anthony Mackie, Lizzy Caplan, and Musical Guest Bartees Strange"	Andy Fisher	ABC
2025	Last Week Tonight with John Oliver	"India Elections"	Paul Pennolino	HBO
2026
2026	The Late Show with Stephen Colbert	"The Late Show with Stephen Colbert Series Finale"	Yvonne De Mare	CBS
2026	Jimmy Kimmel Live!	"Guests: Robert De Niro as The New FCC Chair, Glen Powell, and Musical Guest Sarah McLachlan"	Andy Fisher	ABC
2026	Saturday Night Live	"Host: Olivia Rodrigo"	Liz Patrick	NBC

== Programs with multiple wins ==
13 wins

- Saturday Night Live

4 wins

- The Carol Burnett Show

2 wins

- The Late Show with Stephen Colbert

== Programs with multiple nominations ==
Totals include nominations for Primetime Emmy Award for Outstanding Directing for Nonfiction Programming.

26 nominations

- Saturday Night Live

15 nominations

- The Daily Show
- Late Show with David Letterman

10 nominations

- The Colbert Report
- The Late Show with Stephen Colbert

9 nominations

- Last Week Tonight with John Oliver

7 nominations

- Late Night with David Letterman

6 nominations

- American Idol
- The Carol Burnett Show
- Jimmy Kimmel Live!
- The Tonight Show with Jay Leno

4 nominations

- Portlandia

3 nominations

- The Flip Wilson Show
- The Sonny and Cher Comedy Hour
- The Tonight Show Starring Jimmy Fallon

2 nominations

- A Black Lady Sketch Show
- Da Ali G Show
- Drunk History
- Inside Amy Schumer
- The Jim Henson Hour
- Late Night with Seth Meyers
- The Late Late Show with James Corden
- The Muppet Show
- Real Time with Bill Maher
- Tracey Takes On...
- The Tracey Ullman Show

== Individuals with multiple wins ==
10 wins

- Don Roy King

6 wins

- Louis J. Horvitz

5 wins

- Dwight Hemion

4 wins

- Dave Powers

3 wins

- Don Mischer

2 wins

- Patricia Birch
- Bucky Gunts
- Walter C. Miller
- Liz Patrick

== See also ==
- Primetime Emmy Award for Outstanding Directing for a Comedy Series
