= Primetime Emmy Award for Outstanding Directing for a Variety Special =

Television award category

Primetime Emmy Award for Outstanding Directing for Variety Special
- Awarded for: Outstanding Directing for Variety Special
- Country: United States
- Presented by: Academy of Television Arts & Sciences
- Currently held by: Hamish Hamilton, The Apple Music Super Bowl LX Halftime Show Starring Bad Bunny
- Website: emmys.com

The Primetime Emmy Award for Outstanding Directing for Variety Special is awarded to one television special each year. After being grouped together, the category was initiated alongside Outstanding Directing for a Variety Series in 2009. From the 1980s to 2000s, specials competed alongside series for Outstanding Directing for a Variety, Music or Comedy Program.

In the following list, the first titles listed in gold are the winners; those not in gold are nominees, which are listed in alphabetical order. The years given are those in which the ceremonies took place:

== Winners and nominations ==
Outstanding Directing for a Comedy-Variety or Music Special

=== 1970s ===
Year	Program	Nominees	Network
1971
1971	Peggy Fleming at Sun Valley	Sterling Johnson	NBC
1971	The Anatomy of a Symphony Orchestra (New York Philharmonic Young People's Concerts)	Roger Englander	CBS
1971	George M!	Martin Charnin and Walter C. Miller	NBC
1972
1972	Jack Lemmon in 'S Wonderful, 'S Marvelous, 'S Gershwin	Martin Charnin and Walter C. Miller	NBC
1972	Julie and Carol at Lincoln Center	Dave Powers	CBS
1972	Liszt and the Devil (New York Philharmonic Young People's Concerts)	Roger Englander	CBS
1973
1973	Liza with a Z	Bob Fosse	NBC
1973	Duke Ellington... We Love You Madly	Stan Harris	CBS
1973	Jack Lemmon: Get Happy	Martin Charnin and Dave Wilson	NBC
1973	Once Upon a Mattress	Ron Field and Dave Powers	CBS
1973	You're a Good Man Charlie Brown (Hallmark Hall of Fame)	Walter C. Miller	NBC
1974
1974	Barbra Streisand...and Other Musical Instruments	Dwight Hemion	CBS
1974	Magnavox Presents Frank Sinatra	Marty Pasetta	NBC
1974	Mitzi... A Tribute to the American Housewife	Tony Charmoli	CBS
1974	Peggy Fleming Visits the Soviet Union	Sterling Johnson	NBC
1975
1975	An Evening with John Denver	Bill Davis	ABC
1975	Ann-Margret Olsson	Dwight Hemion	NBC
1975	Shirley MacLaine: If They Could See Me Now	Tony Charmoli	ABC
1976
1976	Steve and Eydie: "Out Love Is Here to Stay"	Dwight Hemion	CBS
1976	John Denver: Rocky Mountain Christmas	Bill Davis	ABC
1976	Mitzi... Roarin' in the 20's"	Tony Charmoli	CBS
1977	Outstanding Directing in a Comedy-Variety or Music Special		
1977	America Salutes Richard Rodgers: The Sound of His Music	Dwight Hemion	CBS
1977	The Barry Manilow Special	George Schaefer	ABC
1977	Doug Henning's World of Magic	Walter C. Miller	NBC
1977	Sills and Burnett at the Met	David Powers	CBS
1977	The Shirley MacLaine Special: Where Do We Go from Here?	Tony Charmoli	CBS
1977	Outstanding Achievement in Coverage of Special Events - Individuals (Note: As a juried award, nominees had to garner 50% approval to win the award.)		
1977	The 28th Annual Emmy Awards	John Moffitt	ABC
1977	The 48th Annual Academy Awards	Marty Pasetta	ABC
1978	Outstanding Directing in a Comedy-Variety or Music Special		
1978	The Sentry Collection Presents Ben Vereen: His Roots	Dwight Hemion	ABC
1978	Doug Henning's World of Magic	Walter C. Miller	NBC
1978	Mitzi... Zings Into Springs	Tony Charmoli	CBS
1978	The Paul Simon Special	Dave Wilson	NBC
1978	The Second Barry Manilow Special	George Schaefer	ABC
1978	Outstanding Achievement in Coverage of Special Events - Individuals (Note: As a juried award, nominees had to garner 50% approval to win the award. The nominee did not meet the benchmark and no award was given.)		
1978	Footlights: The 1978 Tony Awards	Clark Jones	CBS

=== 1980s ===
Year	Program	Nominees	Network
1984	Outstanding Individual Achievement - Classical Music/Dance Programming (Note: As a juried award, nominees had to garner 50% approval to win the award.)		
1984	Dance in America: A Song for Dead Warriors - San Francisco Ballet (Great Performances)	Merrill Brockway	PBS
1984	A Lincoln Center Special: New York City Ballet's Tribute to George Balanchine	Emile Ardolino	PBS
1984	Live from the Met Centennial Gala	Kirk Browning	PBS
1985	Outstanding Individual Achievement - Classical Music/Dance Programming - Directing (Note: As a juried award, nominees had to garner 50% approval to win the award.)		
1985	Dance in America: Baryshnikov by Tharp with American Ballet Theatre (Great Performances)	Don Mischer and Twyla Tharp	PBS
1985	I Pagliacci (Great Performances)	Franco Zeffirelli	PBS
1985	Tosca (Live from the Met)	Kirk Browning	PBS
1986	Outstanding Individual Achievement - Classical Music/Dance Programming (Note: As a juried award, nominees had to garner 50% approval to win the award.)		
1986	Cavalleria Rusticana (Great Performances)	Franco Zeffirelli	PBS
1986	Dance in America: Choreography by Jerome Robbins with the New York City Ballet (Great Performances)	Emile Ardolino	PBS
1986	The Verdi Requiem	Kirk Browning	PBS
1987	Outstanding Individual Achievement - Classical Music/Dance Programming - Directing (Note: As a juried award, nominees had to garner 50% approval to win the award.)		
1987	Goya with Plácido Domingo (Great Performances)	Kirk Browning	PBS
1987	Vladimir Horowitz: The Last Romantic	Albert and David Maysles	PBS
1987	Dance in America: In Memory of... A Ballet by Jerome Robbins (Great Performances)	Emile Ardolino	PBS
1988	Outstanding Individual Achievement - Classical (Note: As a juried award, nominees had to garner 50% approval to win the award.)		
1988	The Metropolitan Opera Presents: Turandot	Kirk Browning	PBS
1988	Dance in America: David Gordon's Made in U.S.A. (Great Performances)	Don Mischer	PBS
1988	Outstanding Individual Achievement - Special Events (Note: As a juried award, nominees had to garner 50% approval to win the award. The nominee did not meet the benchmark and no award was given.)		
1988	The 60th Annual Academy Awards	Marty Pasetta	ABC
1989	Outstanding Directing in Classical Music/Dance Programming (Note: As a juried award, nominees had to garner 50% approval to win the award. The nominee did not meet the benchmark and no award was given.)		
1989	A Pavarotti Celebration: Scenes from La Bohème	Kirk Browning	PBS
1989	Outstanding Directing for Special Events (Note: As a juried award, nominees had to garner 50% approval to win the award.)		
1989	The 11th Annual Kennedy Center Honors: A Celebration of the Performing Arts	Dwight Hemion	CBS

Outstanding Directing for a Variety Special

=== 2000s ===
Year	Program	Nominees	Network
2009	Beijing 2008 Olympic Games Opening Ceremony	Bucky Gunts	NBC
2009	The 81st Annual Academy Awards	Roger Goodman	ABC
2009	Bruce Springsteen and the E Street Band Super Bowl Halftime Show	Don Mischer	NBC
2009	The Neighborhood Ball: An Inauguration Celebration	Glenn Weiss	ABC
2009	You're Welcome America. A Final Night with George W. Bush	Marty Callner	HBO

=== 2010s ===
Year	Program	Nominees	Network
2010	Vancouver 2010 Olympic Winter Games Opening Ceremony	Bucky Gunts	NBC
2010	In Performance at the White House: A Celebration of Music from the Civil Rights Movement	Ron de Moraes	PBS
2010	The Kennedy Center Honors	Louis J. Horvitz	CBS
2010	The 25th Anniversary Rock and Roll Hall of Fame Concert	Joel Gallen	HBO
2010	The 63rd Annual Tony Awards	Glenn Weiss	CBS
2011	Sondheim! The Birthday Concert (Great Performances)	Lonny Price	PBS
2011	The 83rd Annual Academy Awards	Don Mischer	ABC
2011	The 53rd Annual Grammy Awards	Louis J. Horvitz	CBS
2011	Lady Gaga Presents the Monster Ball Tour: At Madison Square Garden	Laurieann Gibson	HBO
2011	The 64th Annual Tony Awards	Glenn Weiss	CBS
2012	The 65th Annual Tony Awards	Glenn Weiss	CBS
2012	The 84th Annual Academy Awards	Don Mischer	ABC
2012	The 54th Annual Grammy Awards	Louis J. Horvitz	CBS
2012	Louis C.K.: Live at the Beacon Theatre	Louis C.K.	FX
2012	New York City Ballet: George Balanchine's The Nutcracker (Live from Lincoln Center)	Alan Skog	PBS
2013	The Kennedy Center Honors	Louis J. Horvitz	CBS
2013	Louis C.K.: Oh My God	Louis C.K.	HBO
2013	The Oscars	Don Mischer	ABC
2013	London 2012 Olympic Games Opening Ceremony	Bucky Gunts and Hamish Hamilton	NBC
2013	12-12-12: The Concert for Sandy Relief	Michael Dempsey	(Note: 12-12-12: The Concert for Sandy Relief was simulcast live on 39 U.S. television stations and more than 25 websites. The Emmys listed no individual network with this nomination.)
2014	The 67th Annual Tony Awards	Glenn Weiss	CBS
2014	The Beatles: The Night That Changed America	Gregg Gelfand	CBS
2014	The Kennedy Center Honors	Louis J. Horvitz	CBS
2014	The Oscars	Hamish Hamilton	ABC
2014	Six by Sondheim	James Lapine	HBO
2014	The Sound of Music Live!	Beth McCarthy-Miller and Rob Ashford	NBC
2015	Saturday Night Live 40th Anniversary Special	Don Roy King	NBC
2015	Annie Lennox: Nostalgia Live in Concert	Natalie Johns	PBS
2015	The Kennedy Center Honors	Louis J. Horvitz	CBS
2015	The Oscars	Hamish Hamilton	ABC
2015	The 68th Annual Tony Awards	Glenn Weiss	CBS
2016
2016	Grease: Live	Thomas Kail and Alex Rudzinski	Fox
2016	Adele Live in New York City	Beth McCarthy-Miller	NBC
2016	Amy Schumer: Live at the Apollo	Chris Rock	HBO
2016	The 58th Annual Grammy Awards	Louis J. Horvitz	CBS
2016	The Kennedy Center Honors	Glenn Weiss	CBS
2016	Lemonade	Kahlil Joseph and Beyoncé Knowles Carter	HBO
2017
2017	The Oscars	Glenn Weiss	ABC
2017	Full Frontal with Samantha Bee Presents Not the White House Correspondents' Dinner	Paul Pennolino	TBS
2017	Stephen Colbert's Live Election Night Democracy's Series Finale: Who's Going to Clean Up This Sh*t?	Jim Hoskinson	Showtime
2017	Tony Bennett Celebrates 90: The Best Is Yet to Come	Jerry Foley	NBC
2018
2018	The Oscars	Glenn Weiss	ABC
2018	Dave Chappelle: Equanimity	Stan Lathan	Netflix
2018	Jerry Seinfeld: Jerry Before Seinfeld	Michael Bonfiglio	Netflix
2018	Steve Martin & Martin Short: An Evening You Will Forget for the Rest of Your Life	Marcus Raboy	Netflix
2018	Super Bowl LII Halftime Show Starring Justin Timberlake	Hamish Hamilton	NBC
2019
2019	Springsteen on Broadway	Thom Zimny	Netflix
2019	Carpool Karaoke: When Corden Met McCartney Live from Liverpool	Ben Winston	CBS
2019	Homecoming: A Film by Beyoncé	Beyoncé Knowles Carter and Ed Burke	Netflix
2019	Live in Front of a Studio Audience: Norman Lear's 'All in the Family' and 'The Jeffersons'	James Burrows and Andy Fisher	ABC
2019	The Oscars	Glenn Weiss	ABC

=== 2020s ===
Year	Program	Nominees	Network
2020
2020	Dave Chappelle: Sticks & Stones	Stan Lathan	Netflix
2020	The 62nd Grammy Awards	Louis J. Horvitz	CBS
2020	Live in Front of a Studio Audience: 'All in the Family' and 'Good Times'	Pamela Fryman and Andy Fisher	ABC
2020	Super Bowl LIV Halftime Show Starring Jennifer Lopez and Shakira	Hamish Hamilton	Fox
2020	The 73rd Annual Tony Awards	Glenn Weiss	CBS
2021
2021	Bo Burnham: Inside	Bo Burnham	Netflix
2021	David Byrne's American Utopia	Spike Lee	HBO
2021	8:46 - Dave Chappelle	Dave Chappelle, Steven Bognar and Julia Reichert	Netflix
2021	Friends: The Reunion	Ben Winston	HBO Max
2021	A West Wing Special to Benefit When We All Vote	Thomas Schlamme	HBO Max
2022
2022	Adele: One Night Only	Paul Dugdale	CBS
2022	Dave Chappelle: The Closer	Stan Lathan	Netflix
2022	Jerrod Carmichael: Rothaniel	Bo Burnham	HBO
2022	Norm Macdonald: Nothing Special	Norm Macdonald (posthumous) and Jeff Tomsic	Netflix
2022	The Pepsi Super Bowl LVI Halftime Show Starring Dr. Dre, Snoop Dogg, Mary J. Blige, Eminem, Kendrick Lamar and 50 Cent	Hamish Hamilton	NBC
2023
2023	The Apple Music Super Bowl LVII Halftime Show Starring Rihanna	Hamish Hamilton and Shawn Carter	Fox
2023	Carol Burnett: 90 Years of Laughter + Love	Paul Miller	NBC
2023	Chris Rock: Selective Outrage	Joel Gallen	Netflix
2023	The Oscars	Glenn Weiss	ABC
2023	Wanda Sykes: I'm an Entertainer	Linda Mendoza	Netflix
2024
2024	The Oscars	Hamish Hamilton	ABC
2024	Dave Chappelle: The Dreamer	Stan Lathan	Netflix
2024	Dick Van Dyke 98 Years of Magic	Russell Norman	CBS
2024	Tig Notaro: Hello Again	Stephanie Allynne	Prime Video
2024	The 76th Annual Tony Awards	Glenn Weiss	CBS
2024	Trevor Noah: Where Was I	David Paul Meyer	Netflix
2025
2025	SNL50: The Anniversary Special	Liz Patrick	NBC
2025	The Apple Music Super Bowl LIX Halftime Show Starring Kendrick Lamar	Hamish Hamilton	Fox
2025	Beyoncé Bowl	Beyoncé Knowles-Carter and Alex Rudzinski	Netflix
2025	The Oscars	Hamish Hamilton	ABC
2025	SNL50: The Homecoming Concert	Beth McCarthy-Miller	Peacock
2025	The 77th Annual Tony Awards	Glenn Weiss	CBS
2026
2026	The Apple Music Super Bowl LX Halftime Show Starring Bad Bunny	Hamish Hamilton	NBC
2026	Dave Chappelle: The Unstoppable...	Rikki Hughes	Netflix
2026	Taylor Swift | The Eras Tour | The Final Show	Glenn Weiss	Disney+
2026	The 78th Annual Tony Awards	Glenn Weiss	CBS
2026	Wanda Sykes: Legacy	Julie Dash	Netflix
