= 57th Primetime Emmy Awards =

2005 American television programming awards

- Promotional poster
- Date: September 18, 2005 (Ceremony); September 11, 2005 (Creative Arts Awards)
- Location: Shrine Auditorium, Los Angeles, California
- Presented by: Academy of Television Arts and Sciences
- Hosted by: Ellen DeGeneres

Highlights
- Most awards: Major: Everybody Loves Raymond / The Life and Death of Peter Sellers (3); All: The Life and Death of Peter Sellers (9)
- Most nominations: Everybody Loves Raymond (8)
- Outstanding Comedy Series: Everybody Loves Raymond
- Outstanding Drama Series: Lost
- Outstanding Miniseries: The Lost Prince
- Outstanding Reality-Competition Program: The Amazing Race
- Outstanding Variety, Music or Comedy Series: The Daily Show with Jon Stewart
- Website: http://www.emmys.com/

Television/radio coverage
- Network: CBS
- Produced by: Ken Ehrlich
- Directed by: Bruce Gowers

The 57th Primetime Emmy Awards were held on Sunday, September 18, 2005, and were hosted by Ellen DeGeneres. The ceremony was broadcast on CBS. BBC America received its first major nomination this year. Twenty seven awards were presented.

The ceremony, which aired three weeks after Hurricane Katrina hit, featured a mini-telethon for Habitat for Humanity and gave DeGeneres more opportunity to use the ceremony to somberly remember the victims of the Gulf Coast. Opening the ceremony was the famous 1970s band Earth, Wind & Fire with a comedic version of "September", in collaboration with The Black Eyed Peas. The ceremony featured tributes to ABC-TV anchor Peter Jennings (who died six weeks earlier) presented by rival anchors Dan Rather and Tom Brokaw, and to talk show host Johnny Carson (who died on January 23, 2005) by close friend and Late Show host David Letterman. Also, the show featured Emmy Idol, five segments in which famous TV stars performed popular TV theme songs in a format like American Idol.

Everybody Loves Raymond became the first comedy to have its final season win the Primetime Emmy Award for Outstanding Comedy Series since Barney Miller in 1982. The CBS comedy series also tied for the lead in major nominations and wins with ten and three, respectively. Freshman series Desperate Housewives became just the second series to earn three nominations in a lead acting category, joining The Golden Girls which had three nominations for Outstanding Lead Actress in a Comedy Series for four separate years. In the drama field, new series Lost won Outstanding Drama Series.

Actress Angela Lansbury received her eighteenth and final nomination for Outstanding Guest Actress in a Drama Series. However, she failed to win causing her record losing streak to be extended. Lansbury died on October 11, 2022.

== Winners and nominees ==
Winners are listed first and highlighted in bold:

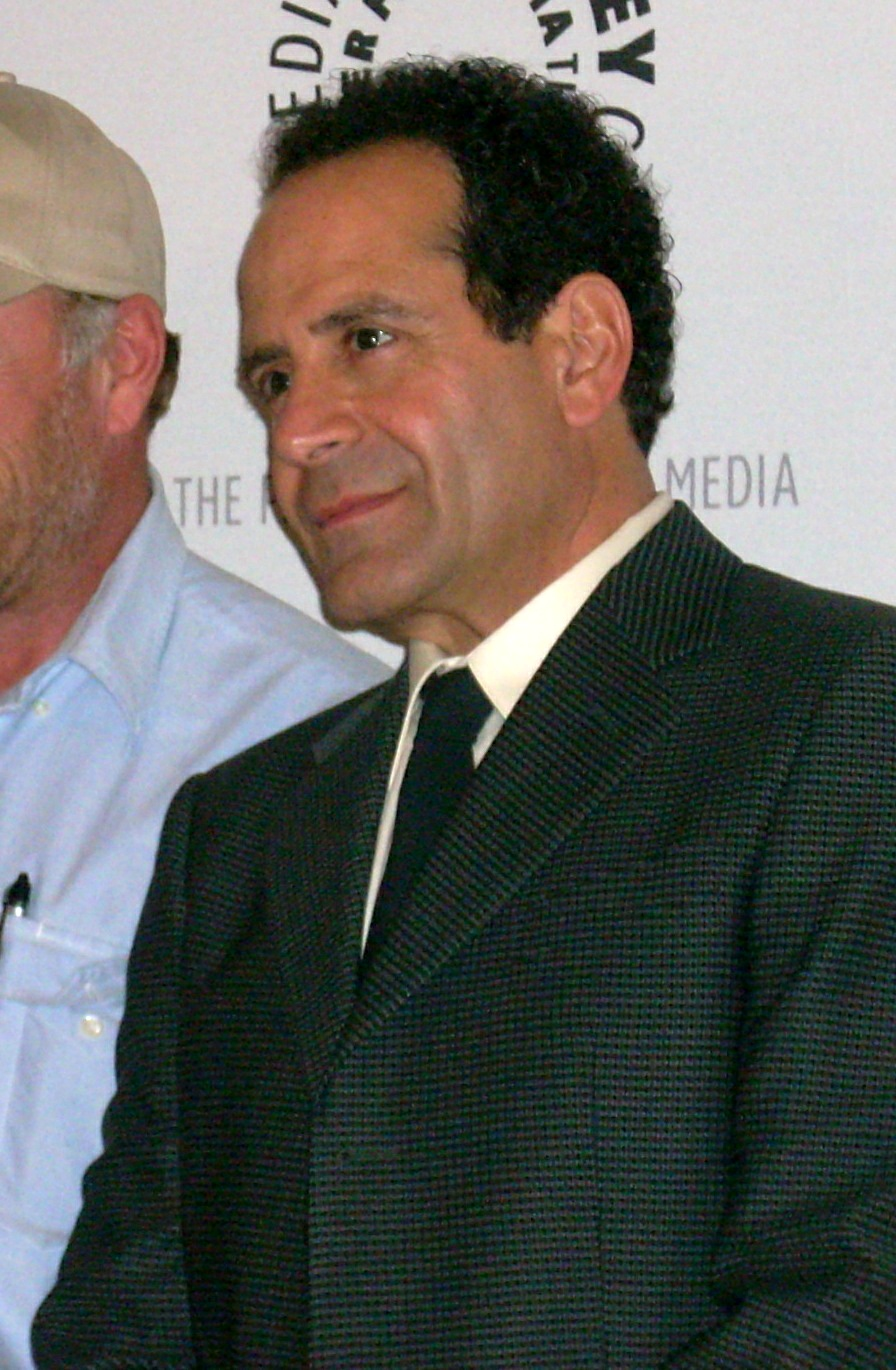
Tony Shalhoub, Outstanding Lead Actor in a Comedy Series winner

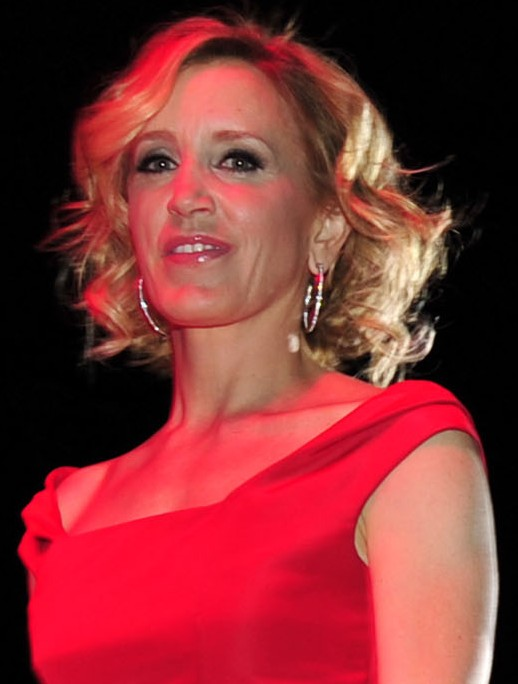
Felicity Huffman, Outstanding Lead Actress in a Comedy Series winner

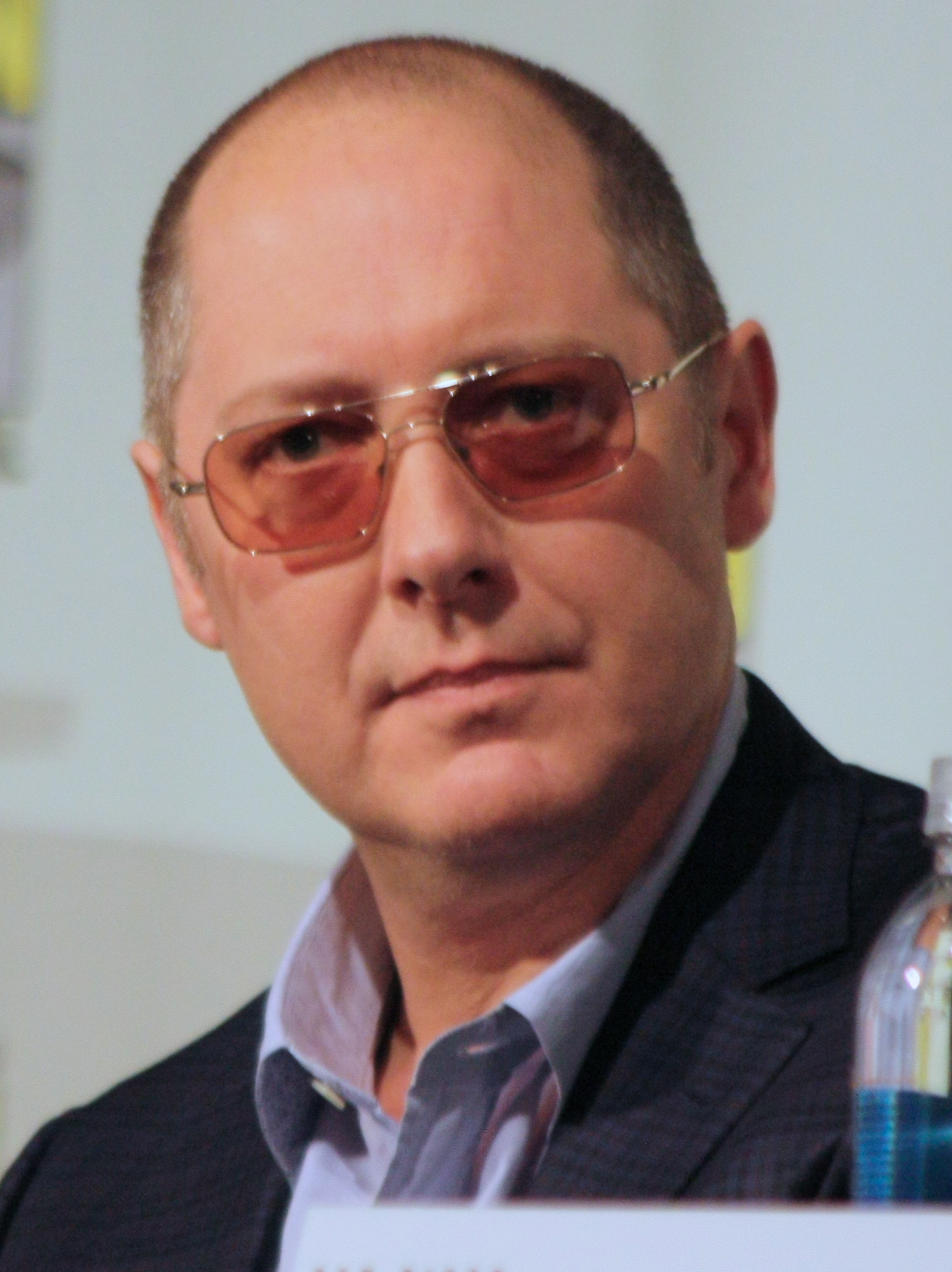
James Spader, Outstanding Lead Actor in a Drama Series winner

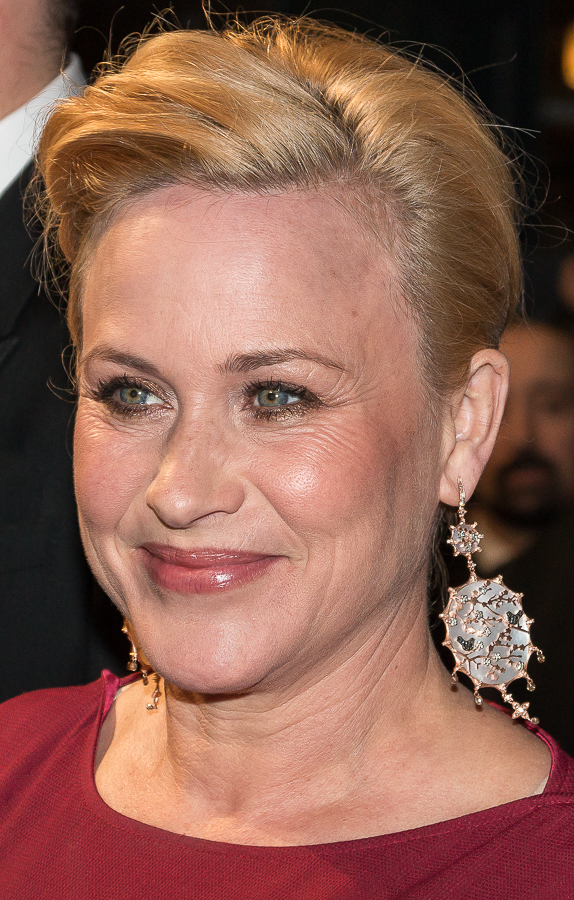
Patricia Arquette, Outstanding Lead Actress in a Drama Series winner

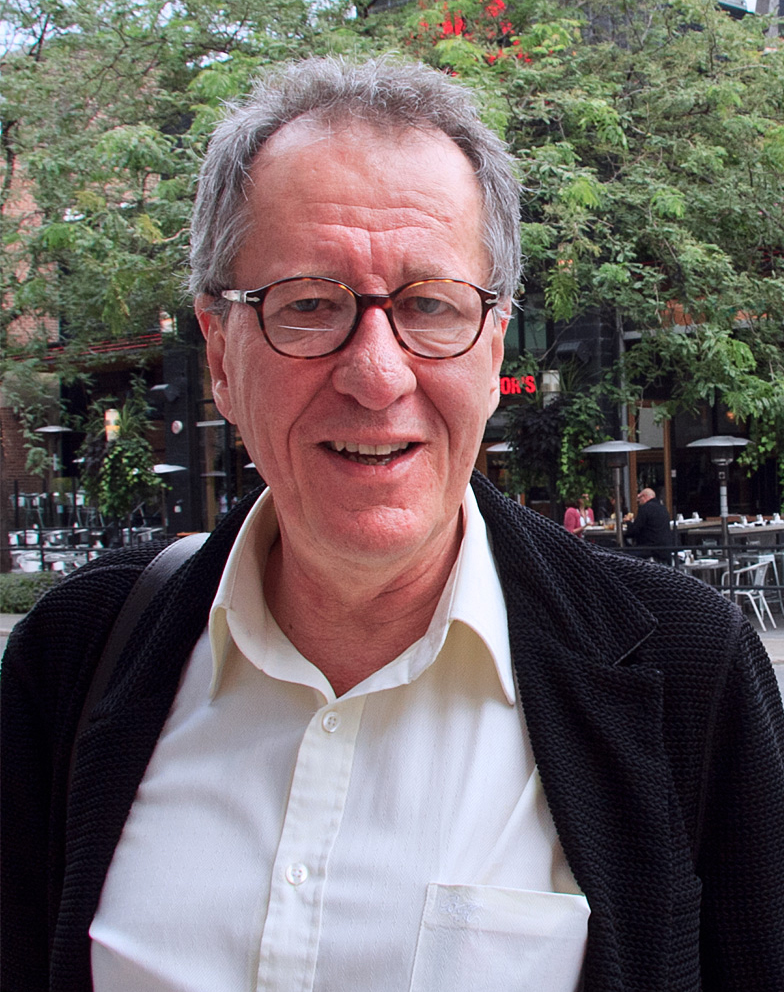
Geoffrey Rush, Outstanding Lead Actor in a Miniseries or Movie winner

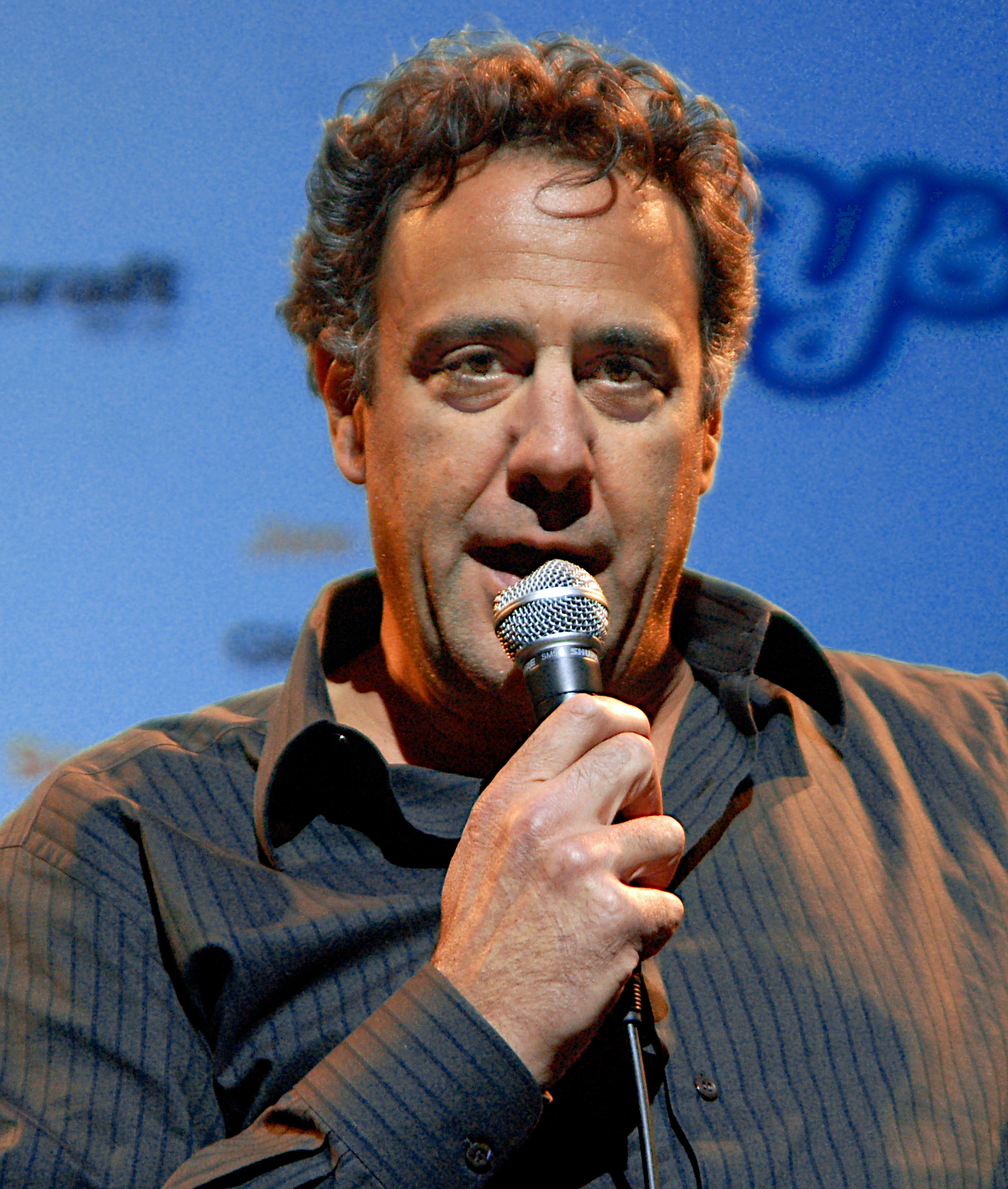
Brad Garrett, Outstanding Supporting Actor in a Comedy Series winner

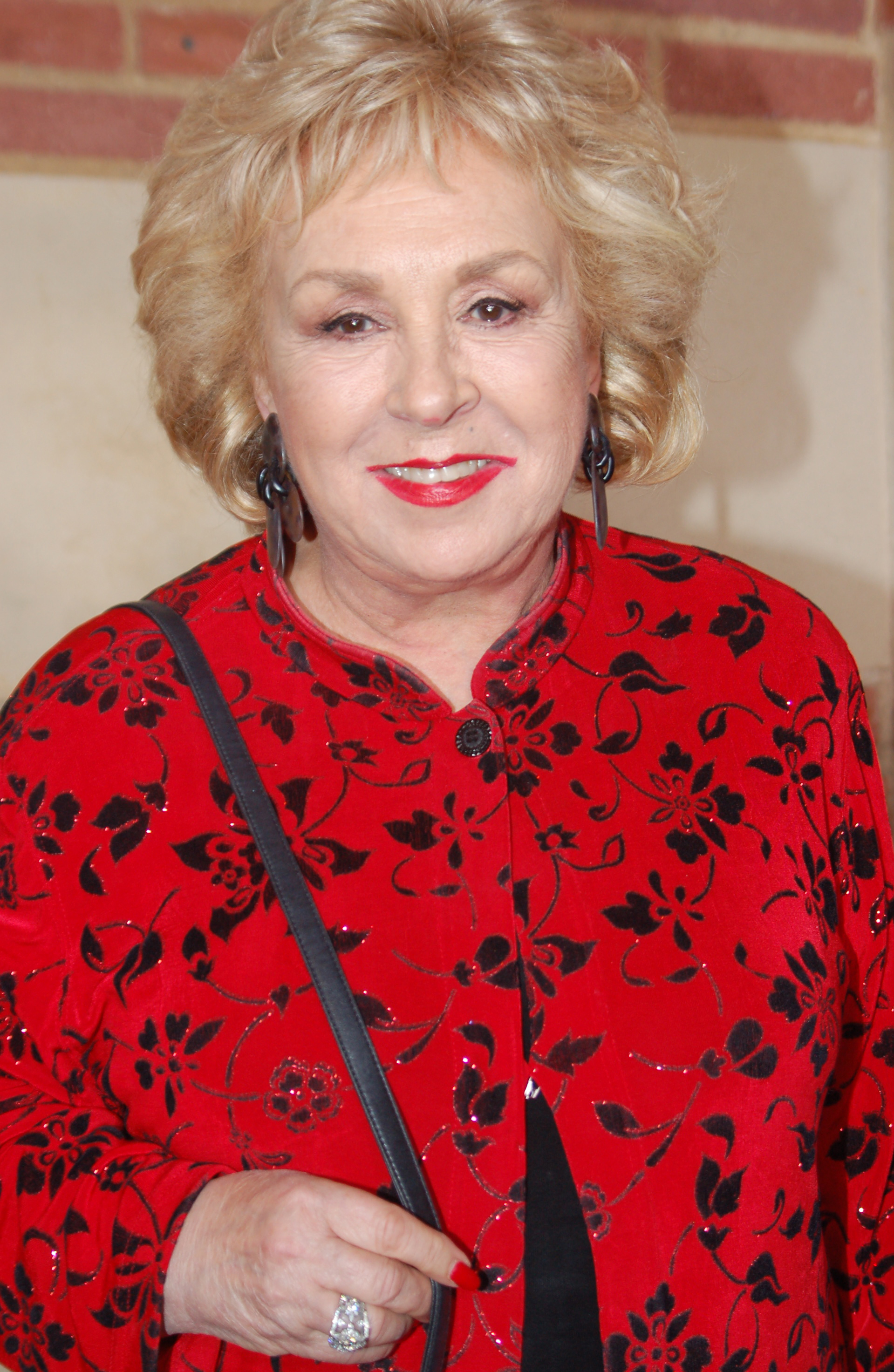
Doris Roberts, Outstanding Supporting Actress in a Comedy Series winner

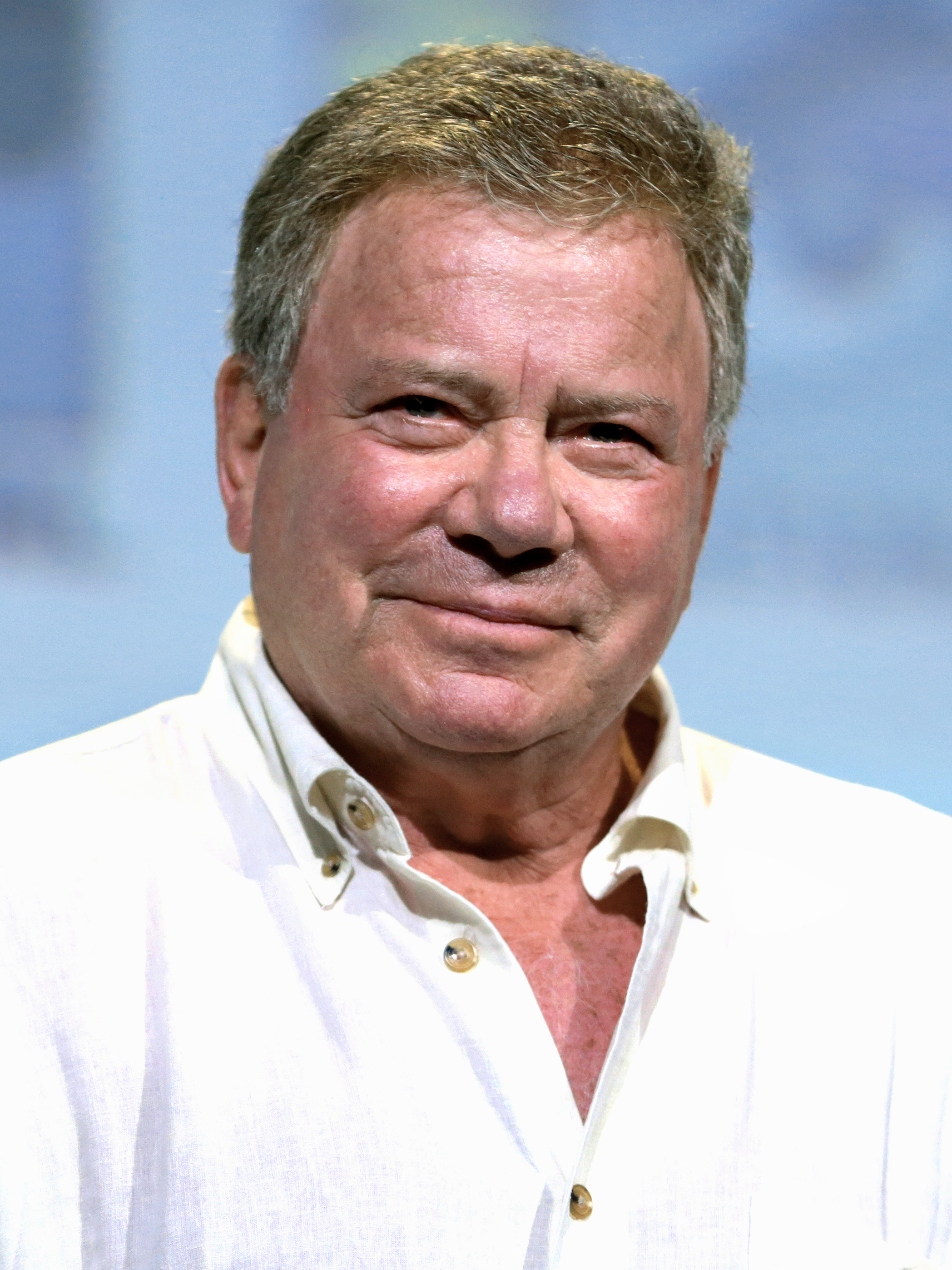
William Shatner, Outstanding Supporting Actor in a Drama Series winner

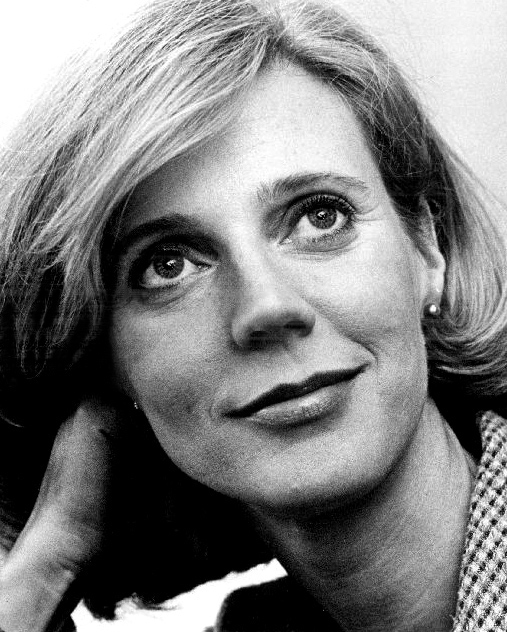
Blythe Danner, Outstanding Supporting Actress in a Drama Series winner

Paul Newman, Outstanding Supporting Actor in a Miniseries or Movie winner

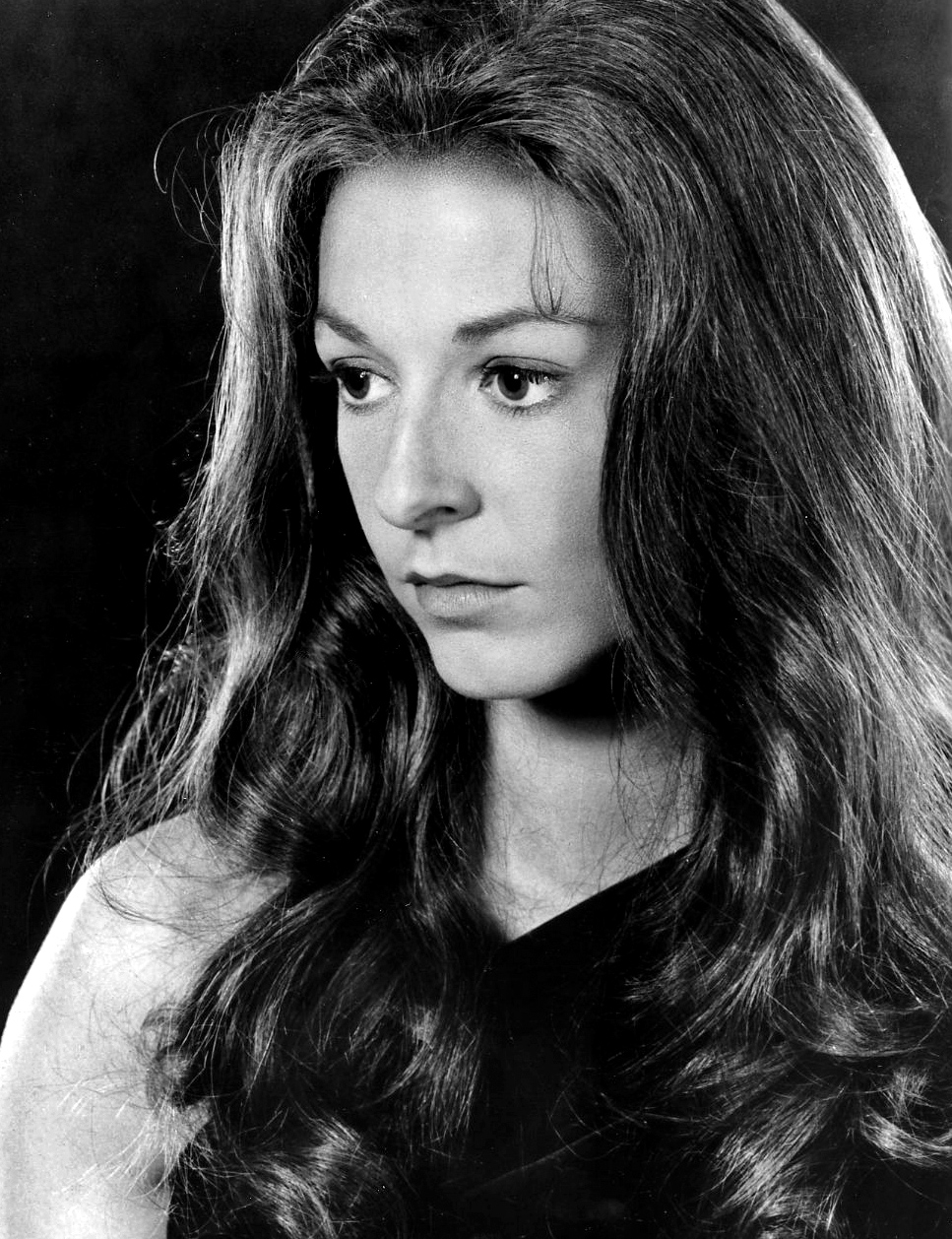
Jane Alexander, Outstanding Supporting Actress in a Miniseries or Movie winner

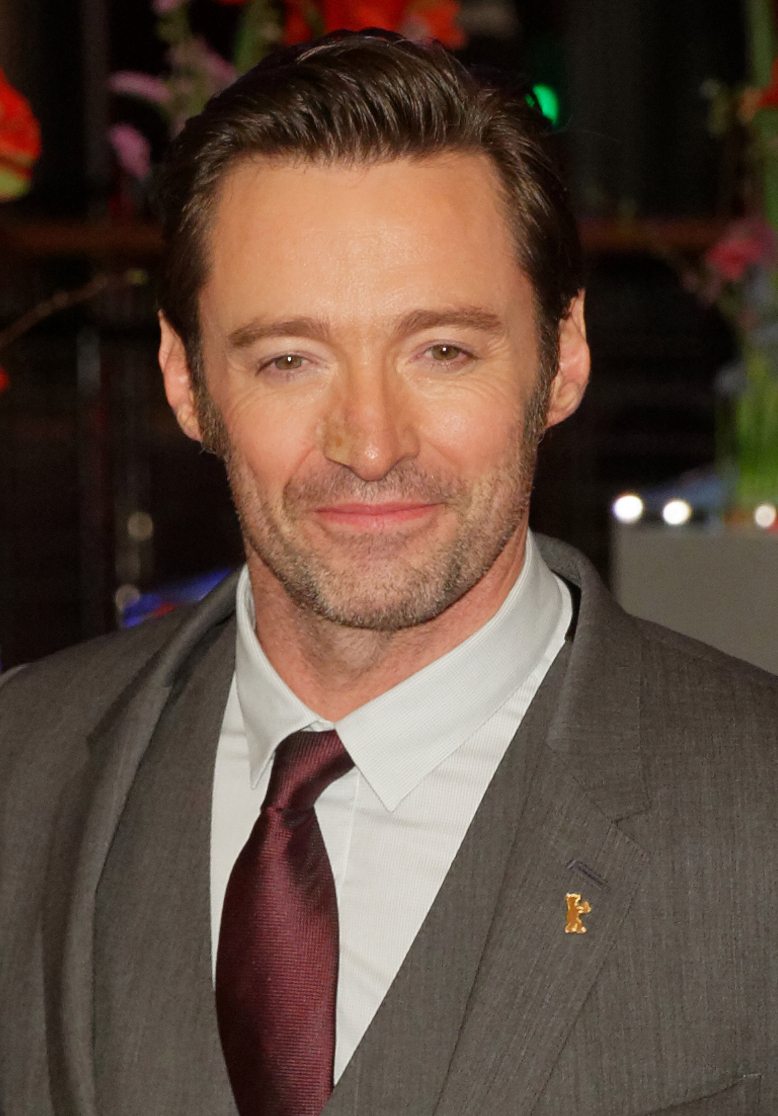
Hugh Jackman, Outstanding Individual Performance in a Variety or Music Program winner

=== Programs ===
Programs
**Outstanding Comedy Series**: **Everybody Loves Raymond (CBS)**; Arrested Development (Fox); Desperate Housewives (ABC); Scrubs (NBC); Will & Grace (NBC)	**Outstanding Drama Series**: **Lost (ABC)**; 24 (Fox); Deadwood (HBO); Six Feet Under (HBO); The West Wing (NBC)
**Outstanding Made for Television Movie**: **Warm Springs (HBO)**; Lackawanna Blues (HBO); The Life and Death of Peter Sellers (HBO); The Office: "Christmas Special" (BBC America); The Wool Cap (TNT)	**Outstanding Miniseries**: **The Lost Prince (PBS)**; The 4400 (USA); Elvis (CBS); Empire Falls (HBO)
**Outstanding Variety, Music or Comedy Series**: **The Daily Show with Jon Stewart (Comedy Central)**; Da Ali G Show (HBO); Late Night with Conan O'Brien (NBC); Late Show with David Letterman (CBS); Real Time with Bill Maher (HBO)	**Outstanding Reality-Competition Program**: **The Amazing Race (CBS)**; American Idol (Fox); The Apprentice (NBC); Project Runway (Bravo); Survivor (CBS)

=== Acting ===
==== Lead performances ====
Lead performances
**Outstanding Lead Actor in a Comedy Series**: **Tony Shalhoub – Monk as Adrian Monk (USA)**; Jason Bateman – Arrested Development as Michael Bluth (Fox); Zach Braff – Scrubs as Dr. John "J.D." Dorian (NBC); Eric McCormack – Will & Grace as Will Truman (NBC); Ray Romano – Everybody Loves Raymond as Ray Barone (CBS) (Episode: “The Power of No”)	**Outstanding Lead Actress in a Comedy Series**: **Felicity Huffman – Desperate Housewives as Lynette Scavo (ABC) (Episode: "Pilot")**; Marcia Cross – Desperate Housewives as Bree Van de Kamp (ABC) (Episode: “Running to Stand Still”); Teri Hatcher – Desperate Housewives as Susan Mayer (ABC) (Episode: “Move On”); Patricia Heaton – Everybody Loves Raymond as Debra Barone (CBS) (Episode: “The Finale”); Jane Kaczmarek – Malcolm in the Middle as Lois (Fox) (Episode: “Lois vs Jaime”)
**Outstanding Lead Actor in a Drama Series**: **James Spader – Boston Legal as Alan Shore (ABC)**; Hank Azaria – Huff as Craig Huffstodt (Showtime); Hugh Laurie – House as Dr. Gregory House (Fox); Ian McShane – Deadwood as Al Swearengen (HBO); Kiefer Sutherland – 24 as Jack Bauer (Fox)	**Outstanding Lead Actress in a Drama Series**: **Patricia Arquette – Medium as Allison DuBois (NBC)**; Glenn Close – The Shield as Monica Rawling (FX); Frances Conroy – Six Feet Under as Ruth Fisher (HBO); Jennifer Garner – Alias as Sydney Bristow (ABC); Mariska Hargitay – Law & Order: Special Victims Unit as Olivia Benson (NBC)
**Outstanding Lead Actor in a Miniseries or Movie**: **Geoffrey Rush – The Life and Death of Peter Sellers as Peter Sellers (HBO)**; Kenneth Branagh – Warm Springs as Franklin D. Roosevelt (HBO); Ed Harris – Empire Falls as Miles Roby (HBO); William H. Macy – The Wool Cap as Gigot (TNT); Jonathan Rhys-Meyers – Elvis as Elvis Presley (CBS)	**Outstanding Lead Actress in a Miniseries or Movie**: **S. Epatha Merkerson – Lackawanna Blues as Rachel Crosby (HBO)**; Halle Berry – Their Eyes Were Watching God as Janie Starks (ABC); Blythe Danner – Back When We Were Grownups as Rebecca Holmes Davitch (CBS); Cynthia Nixon – Warm Springs as Eleanor Roosevelt (HBO); Debra Winger – Dawn Anna as Dawn Anna Townsend (Lifetime)
**Outstanding Individual Performance in a Variety or Music Program**: **Hugh Jackman – The 58th Annual Tony Awards (CBS)**; Whoopi Goldberg – Whoopi Back to Broadway – The 20th Anniversary (HBO); Jay Leno – The Tonight Show with Jay Leno (NBC); Jon Stewart – The Daily Show with Jon Stewart (Comedy Central)

==== Supporting performances ====
Supporting performances
**Outstanding Supporting Actor in a Comedy Series**: **Brad Garrett – Everybody Loves Raymond as Robert Barone (CBS) (Episodes: “A Job For Robert” and "Pat’s Secret")**; Peter Boyle – Everybody Loves Raymond as Frank Barone (CBS) (Episodes: "Boys’ Therapy" and “Tasteless Frank”); Sean Hayes – Will & Grace as Jack McFarland (NBC); Jeremy Piven – Entourage as Ari Gold (HBO); Jeffrey Tambor – Arrested Development as George Bluth Sr. (Fox)	**Outstanding Supporting Actress in a Comedy Series**: **Doris Roberts – Everybody Loves Raymond as Marie Barone (CBS) (Episodes: “Tasteless Frank” and "The Finale")**; Conchata Ferrell – Two and a Half Men as Berta (CBS) (Episodes: "Can You Eat Human Flesh With Wooden Teeth?" & "Woo Hoo, A Hernia Exam"); Megan Mullally – Will & Grace as Karen Walker (NBC); Holland Taylor – Two and a Half Men as Evelyn Harper (CBS) (Episodes: "Those Big Pink Things With Coconuts" & "A Sympathetic Crotch To Cry On"); Jessica Walter – Arrested Development as Lucille Bluth (Fox)
**Outstanding Supporting Actor in a Drama Series**: **William Shatner – Boston Legal as Denny Crane (ABC)**; Alan Alda – The West Wing as Arnold Vinick (NBC); Naveen Andrews – Lost as Sayid Jarrah (ABC); Terry O'Quinn – Lost as John Locke (ABC); Oliver Platt – Huff as Russell Tupper (Showtime)	**Outstanding Supporting Actress in a Drama Series**: **Blythe Danner – Huff as Isabelle "Izzy" Huffstodt (Showtime)**; Stockard Channing – The West Wing as First Lady Abbey Bartlet (NBC); Tyne Daly – Judging Amy as Maxine Gray (CBS); Sandra Oh – Grey's Anatomy as Dr. Cristina Yang (ABC); C. C. H. Pounder – The Shield as Claudette Wyms (FX)
**Outstanding Supporting Actor in a Miniseries or Movie**: **Paul Newman – Empire Falls as Max Roby (HBO)**; Brian Dennehy – Our Fathers as Father Dominic Spagnolia (Showtime); Philip Seymour Hoffman – Empire Falls as Charlie Mayne (HBO); Christopher Plummer – Our Fathers as Cardinal Bernard Francis Law (Showtime); Randy Quaid – Elvis as Colonel Tom Parker (CBS)	**Outstanding Supporting Actress in a Miniseries or Movie**: **Jane Alexander – Warm Springs as Sara Roosevelt (HBO)**; Kathy Bates – Warm Springs as Helena Mahoney (HBO); Camryn Manheim – Elvis as Gladys Presley (CBS); Charlize Theron – The Life and Death of Peter Sellers as Britt Ekland (HBO); Joanne Woodward – Empire Falls as Francine Whiting (HBO)

=== Directing ===
Directing
**Outstanding Directing for a Comedy Series**: **Desperate Housewives: "Pilot" – Charles McDougall (ABC)**; Entourage: "Pilot" – David Frankel (HBO); Everybody Loves Raymond: "The Finale" – Gary Halvorson (CBS); Monk: "Mr. Monk Takes His Medicine" – Randall Zisk (USA); Will & Grace: "It's a Dad, Dad, Dad, Dad World" – James Burrows (NBC)	**Outstanding Directing for a Drama Series**: **Lost: "Pilot" – J. J. Abrams (ABC)**; CSI: Crime Scene Investigation: "Grave Danger" – Quentin Tarantino (CBS); Deadwood: "Complications" – Gregg Fienberg (HBO); Grey's Anatomy: "A Hard Day's Night" – Peter Horton (ABC); Huff: "Crazy Nuts & All Fucked Up" – Scott Winant (Showtime); Rescue Me: "Guts" – Peter Tolan (FX); The West Wing: "2162 Votes" – Alex Graves (NBC)
**Outstanding Directing for a Variety, Music or Comedy Program**: **Games of the XXVIII Olympiad Opening Ceremony – Bucky Gunts (NBC)**; The 77th Annual Academy Awards – Louis J. Horvitz (ABC); Da Ali G Show: "Rekognize" – James Bobin (HBO); The Daily Show with Jon Stewart – Chuck O'Neil (Comedy Central); Late Show with David Letterman – Jerry Foley (CBS)	**Outstanding Directing for a Miniseries, Movie or Dramatic Special**: **The Life and Death of Peter Sellers – Stephen Hopkins (HBO)**; Empire Falls – Fred Schepisi (HBO); Lackawanna Blues – George C. Wolfe (HBO); Warm Springs – Joseph Sargent (HBO)

=== Writing ===
Writing
**Outstanding Writing for a Comedy Series**: **Arrested Development: "Righteous Brothers" – Mitchell Hurwitz and James Vallely (Fox)**; Arrested Development: "Sad Sack" – Barbara Feldman (Fox); Arrested Development: "Sword of Destiny" – Brad Copeland (Fox); Desperate Housewives: "Pilot" – Marc Cherry (ABC); Everybody Loves Raymond: "The Finale" – Philip Rosenthal, Ray Romano, Tucker Cawley, Lew Schneider, Steve Skrovan, Jeremy Stevens, Mike Royce, Aaron Shure, Tom Caltabiano, and Leslie Caveny (CBS)	**Outstanding Writing for a Drama Series**: **House: "Three Stories" – David Shore (Fox)**; Lost: "Pilot" – J. J. Abrams, Damon Lindelof, and Jeffrey Lieber (ABC); Lost: "Walkabout" – David Fury (ABC); Rescue Me: "Guts" – Peter Tolan and Denis Leary (FX); The Wire: "Middle Ground" – George Pelecanos and David Simon (HBO)
**Outstanding Writing for a Variety, Music or Comedy Program**: **The Daily Show with Jon Stewart (Comedy Central)**; Da Ali G Show (HBO); Late Night with Conan O'Brien (NBC); Late Show with David Letterman (CBS); Real Time with Bill Maher (HBO)	**Outstanding Writing for a Miniseries, Movie or Dramatic Special**: **The Life and Death of Peter Sellers – Christopher Markus and Stephen McFeely (HBO)**; The 4400: "Pilot" – Scott Peters and René Echevarria (USA); Empire Falls – Richard Russo (HBO); The Office: "Christmas Special" – Ricky Gervais and Stephen Merchant (BBC America); Warm Springs – Margaret Nagle (HBO)

== Most major nominations ==
Networks with multiple major nominations (Note: "Major" constitutes the categories listed above: Program, Acting, Directing, and Writing. Does not include the technical categories.)
Network	No. of Nominations
HBO	35
NBC	28
CBS	28
ABC	24
Fox	14

Programs with multiple major nominations
Program	Category	Network	No. of Nominations
Everybody Loves Raymond	Comedy	CBS	8
Arrested Development	Comedy	Fox	7
Empire Falls	Miniseries	HBO	7
Warm Springs	Movie	HBO	7
Desperate Housewives	Comedy	ABC	6
Lost	Drama	ABC	6
The Life and Death of Peter Sellers	Movie	HBO	5
Will & Grace	Comedy	NBC	5
Elvis	Miniseries	CBS	4
The Daily Show with Jon Stewart	Variety	Comedy Central	4
Huff	Drama	Showtime	4
The West Wing	Drama	NBC	4
Da Ali G Show	Variety	HBO	3
Deadwood	Drama	HBO	3
Lackawanna Blues	Movie	HBO	3
Late Show with David Letterman	Variety	CBS	3
24	Drama	Fox	2
The 4400	Miniseries	USA	2
Boston Legal	Drama	ABC	2
Entourage	Comedy	HBO	2
Grey's Anatomy	Drama	ABC	2
House	Drama	Fox	2
Late Night with Conan O'Brien	Variety	NBC	2
Monk	Comedy	USA	2
The Office Christmas Special	Movie	BBC America	2
Our Fathers	Movie	Showtime	2
Real Time with Bill Maher	Variety	HBO	2
Rescue Me	Drama	FX	2
Scrubs	Comedy	NBC	2
The Shield	Drama	FX	2
Six Feet Under	Drama	HBO	2
Two and a Half Men	Comedy	CBS	2
The Wool Cap	Movie	TNT	2

== Most major awards ==
Networks with multiple major awards
Network	No. of Awards
HBO	7
ABC	6
CBS	5
Comedy Central	2
Fox	2
NBC	2

Programs with multiple major awards
Program	Category	Network	No. of Awards
Everybody Loves Raymond	Comedy	CBS	3
The Life and Death of Peter Sellers	Movie	HBO	3
Boston Legal	Drama	ABC	2
The Daily Show with Jon Stewart	Variety	Comedy Central	2
Desperate Housewives	Comedy	ABC	2
Lost	Drama	ABC	2
Warm Springs	Movie	HBO	2

== Presenters ==
The awards were presented by the following people:

Presenter(s)	Role(s)
The cast of Desperate Housewives	Presented the award for Outstanding Supporting Actor in a Comedy Series
Kyra Sedgwick; Kiefer Sutherland	Presented the award for Outstanding Supporting Actor in a Drama Series
Jon Cryer; Charlie Sheen	Presented the award for Outstanding Individual Performance in a Variety or Music Program
Blue Man Group	Presented the award for Outstanding Reality Competition Program
Hugh Laurie; Zach Braff	Presented the award for Outstanding Supporting Actress in a Drama Series
Jason Lee; Debra Messing	Presented the award for Outstanding Supporting Actor in a Miniseries or Movie
Lauren Graham; Jennifer Love Hewitt	Presented the award for Outstanding Supporting Actress in a Miniseries or Movie
Bobby Cannavale; Kathryn Joosten	Presented the awards for Outstanding Directing for a Variety, Music or Comedy Program and Outstanding Writing for a Variety, Music or Comedy Program
Adrian Grenier; Mischa Barton	Presented the award for Outstanding Supporting Actress in a Comedy Series
The cast of Everybody Loves Raymond	Presented the award for Outstanding Variety, Music or Comedy Series
Amanda Plummer; Ray Liotta	Presented the awards for Outstanding Directing for a Drama Series and Outstanding Writing for a Drama Series
Halle Berry	Presented the award for Outstanding Lead Actor in a Miniseries or Movie
Ellen Pompeo; Patrick Dempsey	Presented the awards for Outstanding Directing for a Miniseries, Movie or Dramatic Special and Outstanding Writing for a Miniseries, Movie or Dramatic Special
Geena Davis; Matthew Fox	Presented the award for Outstanding Lead Actress in a Miniseries or Movie
Jon Stewart	Presented the awards for Outstanding Directing for a Comedy Series for Outstanding Writing for a Comedy Series
Quentin Tarantino; Marg Helgenberger	Presented the award for Outstanding Made for Television Movie
Mariska Hargitay; Jimmy Smits	Presented the award for Outstanding Miniseries
Conan O'Brien	Presented the award for Outstanding Lead Actress in a Comedy Series
James Spader	Presented the award for Outstanding Lead Actress in a Drama Series
Sela Ward; Craig Ferguson	Presented the award for Outstanding Lead Actor in a Comedy Series
Charles S. Dutton	Presented the award for Outstanding Lead Actor in a Drama Series
Hugh Jackman; Whoopi Goldberg	Presented the awards for Outstanding Drama Series and Outstanding Comedy Series

== In Memoriam ==
Dan Rather and Tom Brokaw presented a tribute to Peter Jennings and David Letterman presented a tribute to Johnny Carson

- Eddie Albert
- Anne Bancroft
- Mason Adams
- Barbara Bel Geddes
- William Bell
- Shana Alexander
- Dana Elcar
- Rodney Dangerfield
- Greg Garrison
- John Fiedler
- Ossie Davis
- Frank Gorshin
- Perry Lafferty
- Howard Morris
- James Doohan
- Paul Henning
- Brian Kelly
- Bob Denver
- Howard Keel
- Brock Peters
- Christopher Reeve
- Pat McCormick
- Herb Sargent
- Chris Schenkel
- Danny Simon
- Hal Sitowitz
- Michael Weisbarth
- Ruth Warrick
- Paul Winchell
- Jerry Orbach
