= Liz Patrick =

American television director

Liz Patrick is an American television director. She has been the director of Saturday Night Live since 2021. She is also known for directing 13 seasons of The Ellen DeGeneres Show and starting her directing career at MTV.

== Education ==
Patrick attended Boston University, where she graduated with a degree in Film and Television.

== Career ==
Patrick began her television directing career in New York City at MTV. From 1998 to 2017, she directed numerous shows, live music and awards specials for the network such as Total Request Live, MTV Spring Break, MTV Beach House, MTV New Year's Eve, among others.

In 2008, Patrick moved to Los Angeles to direct The Ellen DeGeneres Show, becoming the show's first female director. She spent 13 seasons at Ellen, directing a total of 2,195 episodes. In 2018, Patrick also became a producer of the show.

In 2021, Patrick became the director of Saturday Night Live, making her the show's fifth director, and only second female director (behind Beth McCarthy-Miller), in SNL's 47 year history. She replaced director Don Roy King, who retired December 2021. At the start of the season, both King and Patrick co-directed together, with Patrick observing King on two episodes, until Patrick started directing Saturday Night Live solo on January 15, 2022. For her work on Saturday Night Live, she has won two Emmy Awards, including the show's record-breaking 101st Emmy Award in 2024.

On February 16, 2025, Patrick directed Saturday Night Live 50th Anniversary Special, commemorating the 50th anniversary of Saturday Night Live. The three-hour live television special required Patrick and show designers to bring together SNL's current and former cast members, musical guests, and celebrity hosts to honor five decades of cultural impact and groundbreaking television. The live broadcast was produced without the traditional dress rehearsal. Patrick won a Primetime Emmy Award for Outstanding Directing for a Variety Special for SNL50.

In July 2025, Patrick directed the first televised edition of the Las Culturistas Culture Awards, co-created, and co-hosted by Bowen Yang and Matt Rogers. The show was produced in Los Angeles, and broadcast on Bravo, and streamed on Peacock on August 5, 2025.

== Filmography ==
Year	Title	Notes
2007	MTV Goes Gold: New Year's Eve 2007	TV Special
2007	MTV News Presents: The Hottest MCs in the Game	TV Movie
2007	Making the Band 4	TV Series (1 episode)
2007	Wild 'n Out	TV Series (13 episodes)
2008–2021	The Ellen DeGeneres Show	TV Series (2,195 episodes)
2008	Tila Tequila's New Year's Eve Masquerade 2008	TV Special
2008	Jackassworld.com: 24 Hour Takeover	TV Special
2008	Spring Break 2008: Pretty Smart	TV Special
2008	New Now Next Awards	TV Special
2008	FNMTV Premieres	TV Special
2008	FNMTV Presents: A Miley-Sized Surprise... New Year's Eve 2009	TV Special
2010	The Hills Live: A Hollywood Ending	TV Special
2010	The 2010 VH1 Do Something Awards	TV Special
2010	Follow Me: The Search for the First MTV TJ	TV Special
2010	MTV New Year's Bash 2011	TV Special
2013	Guy Court	TV Series (8 episodes)
2014	Wolf Watch	TV Series (7 episodes)
2015	Repeat After Me	TV Series (8 episodes)
2016	MTV Fandom Awards	TV Special
2016	Wanda Sykes: What Happened... Ms. Sykes?	TV Special
2017	MTV Movie and TV Awards 2017 Pre-Show	TV Special
2017	Heads Up!	TV Series (50 episodes)
2017	2017 Logo Trailblazer Honors	TV Special
2018	2018 VH1 Trailblazer Honors	TV Special
2020–2021	Ellen's Game of Games	TV Series (20 episodes)
2021–present	Saturday Night Live	TV Series
2021	Rupi Kaur Live	TV Special
2021	Michael Bublé's Christmas in the City	TV Special
2022–2024	Saturday Night Live Christmas Special	TV Series (2 episodes)
2024	The 2024 SNL Election Special	TV Special
2025	Saturday Night Live 50th Anniversary Special	TV Special
2025	Las Culturistas Culture Awards	TV Special

== Awards and nominations ==
=== Directors Guild of America Awards ===
Year	Category	Nominated Work	Result	Ref.
2022	Outstanding Directorial Achievement in Variety/Talk/News/Sports – Regularly Scheduled Programming	Saturday Night Live (Host and Musical Guest: Jack Harlow)	Won	
2023	Outstanding Directorial Achievement in Variety/Talk/News/Sports – Regularly Scheduled Programming	Saturday Night Live (Host: Pedro Pascal; Musical Guest: Coldplay)	Won	
2024	Outstanding Directorial Achievement in Variety/Talk/News/Sports – Regularly Scheduled Programming	Saturday Night Live (Host: John Mulaney; Musical Guest: Chappell Roan)	Won	
2025	Outstanding Directorial Achievement in Variety	Saturday Night Live 50th Anniversary Special	Won	

=== Emmy Awards ===
Year	Category	Nominated Work	Result	Ref.
Primetime Emmy Awards
2022	Outstanding Directing for a Variety Series	Saturday Night Live (Host: Billie Eilish)	Nominated	
2023	Outstanding Directing for a Variety Series	Saturday Night Live (Co-Hosts: Steve Martin and Martin Short)	Won	
2024	Outstanding Directing for a Variety Series	Saturday Night Live (Host: Ryan Gosling)	Won	
2025	Outstanding Directing for a Variety Special	Saturday Night Live 50th Anniversary Special	Won	
2026	Outstanding Directing for a Variety Series	Saturday Night Live (Host: Olivia Rodrigo)	Nominated	
Daytime Emmy Awards
2002	Outstanding Special Class Directing	Total Request Live	Nominated	
2003	Outstanding Special Class Directing	Total Request Live	Nominated	
2009	Outstanding Directing in a Talk Show/Morning Program	The Ellen DeGeneres Show	Nominated	
2010	Outstanding Directing in a Talk Show/Morning Program	The Ellen DeGeneres Show	Nominated	
2011	Outstanding Directing in a Talk Show/Morning Program	The Ellen DeGeneres Show	Nominated	
2012	Outstanding Directing in a Talk Show/Morning Program	The Ellen DeGeneres Show	Nominated	
2013	Outstanding Directing in a Talk Show/Morning Program	The Ellen DeGeneres Show	Won	
2014	Outstanding Talk Show/Entertainment	The Ellen DeGeneres Show	Won	
2015	Outstanding Talk Show/Entertainment	The Ellen DeGeneres Show	Won	
2016	Outstanding Talk Show/Entertainment	The Ellen DeGeneres Show	Nominated	
2017	Outstanding Directing in a Talk Show/Morning Program	The Ellen DeGeneres Show	Won	
2018	Outstanding Talk Show/Entertainment	The Ellen DeGeneres Show	Nominated	
2019	Outstanding Directing in a Talk Show/Morning Program	The Ellen DeGeneres Show	Won	
2020	Outstanding Directing in a Talk Show/Morning Program	The Ellen DeGeneres Show	Nominated	
