= 27th Primetime Emmy Awards =

1975 American television programming awards

- Date: May 19, 1975
- Location: Hollywood Palladium, Los Angeles, California
- Presented by: Academy of Television Arts and Sciences

Highlights
- Most awards: The Mary Tyler Moore Show (5)
- Most nominations: M*A*S*H (9)
- Outstanding Comedy Series: The Mary Tyler Moore Show
- Outstanding Drama Series: Upstairs, Downstairs
- Outstanding Limited Series: Benjamin Franklin
- Outstanding Comedy-Variety or Music Series: The Carol Burnett Show

Television/radio coverage
- Network: CBS

The 27th Emmy Awards, later known as the 27th Primetime Emmy Awards, were handed out on May 19, 1975. There was no host this year. 35 awards were presented. Winners are listed in bold and series' networks are in parentheses.

The top shows of the night were The Mary Tyler Moore Show, and Upstairs, Downstairs which won its second straight Emmy for Outstanding Drama Series. M*A*S*H led all shows with nine major nominations heading into the ceremony, but only won one award. The Mary Tyler Moore Show led all shows with five major wins. Upstairs, Downstairs became the first non-American drama to win the outstanding drama award twice and was the third win in five years for a British produced drama.

This is the 1st ceremony where one network received all the nominations in a Series category. It would not happen again until the 39th Primetime Emmy Awards.

== Winners and nominees ==
Note: Winners are indicated in bold type.

=== Programs ===
Programs
**Outstanding Comedy Series**: **The Mary Tyler Moore Show (CBS)**; All in the Family (CBS); M*A*S*H (CBS); Rhoda (CBS)	**Outstanding Drama Series**: **Upstairs, Downstairs (PBS)**; Kojak (CBS); Police Story (NBC); The Streets of San Francisco (ABC); The Waltons (CBS)
**Outstanding Comedy-Variety or Music Series**: **The Carol Burnett Show (CBS)**; Cher (CBS)	**Outstanding Special - Comedy-Variety or Music**: **An Evening with John Denver (ABC)**; Lily (ABC); Shirley MacLaine: If They Could See Me Now (CBS)
**Outstanding Special - Drama or Comedy**: **The Law (NBC)**; Love Among the Ruins (ABC); The Missiles of October (ABC); QB VII (ABC); Queen of the Stardust Ballroom (CBS)	**Outstanding Limited Series**: **Benjamin Franklin (CBS)**; Columbo (NBC); McCloud (NBC)

=== Acting ===
==== Lead performances ====
Acting
**Outstanding Lead Actor in a Comedy Series**: **Tony Randall as Felix Unger in The Odd Couple (ABC)**; Jack Albertson as Ed Brown in Chico and the Man (NBC); Alan Alda as Hawkeye Pierce in M*A*S*H (CBS); Jack Klugman as Oscar Madison in The Odd Couple (ABC); Carroll O'Connor as Archie Bunker in All in the Family (CBS)	**Outstanding Lead Actress in a Comedy Series**: **Valerie Harper as Rhoda Morgenstern in Rhoda (CBS) (Episode: "Rhoda's Wedding")**; Mary Tyler Moore as Mary Richards in The Mary Tyler Moore Show (CBS); Jean Stapleton as Edith Bunker in All in the Family (CBS)
**Outstanding Lead Actor in a Drama Series**: **Robert Blake as Tony Baretta in Baretta (ABC)**; Karl Malden as Detective Lt. Mike Stone in The Streets of San Francisco (ABC); Barry Newman as Anthony J. Petrocelli in Petrocelli (NBC); Telly Savalas as Theo Kojak in Kojak (CBS)	**Outstanding Lead Actress in a Drama Series**: **Jean Marsh as Rose in Upstairs, Downstairs (PBS)**; Angie Dickinson as Sgt. Suzanne 'Pepper' Anderson in Police Woman (NBC); Michael Learned as Olivia Walton in The Waltons (CBS)
**Outstanding Lead Actor in a Special Program – Drama or Comedy**: **Laurence Olivier as Sir Arthur Glanville-Jones in Love Among the Ruins (ABC)**; Richard Chamberlain as Edmond Dantès in The Count of Monte Cristo (NBC); William Devane as President John F. Kennedy in The Missiles of October (ABC); Charles Durning as Al Green in Queen of the Stardust Ballroom (CBS); Henry Fonda as Clarence Darrow in Clarence Darrow (NBC)	**Outstanding Lead Actress in a Special Program – Drama or Comedy**: **Katharine Hepburn as Jessica Medlicott in Love Among the Ruins (ABC)**; Jill Clayburgh as Wanda in Hustling (ABC); Elizabeth Montgomery as Lizzie Borden in The Legend of Lizzie Borden (ABC); Diana Rigg as Philippa in In This House of Brede (CBS); Maureen Stapleton as Bea Asher in Queen of the Stardust Ballroom (CBS)
**Outstanding Lead Actor in a Limited Series**: **Peter Falk as Lt. Columbo in Columbo (NBC)**; Dennis Weaver as Sam McCloud in McCloud (NBC)	**Outstanding Lead Actress in a Limited Series**: **Jessica Walter as Amy Prentiss in Amy Prentiss (NBC)**; Susan Saint James as Sally McMillan in McMillan & Wife (NBC)

==== Supporting performances ====
**Outstanding Continuing Performance by a Supporting Actor in a Comedy Series**: **Edward Asner as Lou Grant in The Mary Tyler Moore Show (CBS) (Episode: "Lou and That Woman")**; Gary Burghoff as Radar O'Reilly in M*A*S*H (CBS); Ted Knight as Ted Baxter in The Mary Tyler Moore Show (CBS); Rob Reiner as Michael Stivic in All in the Family (CBS); McLean Stevenson as Henry Blake in M*A*S*H (CBS)	**Outstanding Continuing Performance by a Supporting Actress in a Comedy Series**: **Betty White as Sue Ann Nivens in The Mary Tyler Moore Show (CBS)**; Julie Kavner as Brenda Morgenstern in Rhoda (CBS); Loretta Swit as Margaret Houlihan in M*A*S*H (CBS); Nancy Walker as Ida Morgenstern in Rhoda (CBS)
**Outstanding Continuing Performance by a Supporting Actor in a Drama Series**: **Will Geer as Zebulon Walton in The Waltons (CBS)**; J.D. Cannon as Peter B. Clifford in McCloud (NBC); Michael Douglas as Steve Keller in The Streets of San Francisco (ABC)	**Outstanding Continuing Performance by a Supporting Actress in a Drama Series**: **Ellen Corby as Esther Walton in The Waltons (CBS)**; Angela Baddeley as Mrs. Bridges in Upstairs, Downstairs (PBS); Nancy Walker as Mildred in McMillan & Wife (NBC)
**Outstanding Single Performance** **by a Supporting Actor in a Comedy or Drama Special**: **Anthony Quayle as Tom Banniester in QB VII (ABC)**; Ralph Bellamy as Adlai Stevenson in The Missiles of October (ABC); Jack Hawkins as Justice Gilroy in QB VII (ABC); Trevor Howard as Abbe Faria in The Count of Monte Cristo (NBC)	**Outstanding Single Performance** **by a Supporting Actress in a Comedy or Drama Special**: **Juliet Mills as Samantha Cady in QB VII (ABC)**; Eileen Heckart as Herman's Mother in Wedding Band (ABC); Charlotte Rae as Helen in Queen of the Stardust Ballroom (CBS); Lee Remick as Lady Margaret in QB VII (ABC)
**Outstanding Single Performance** **by a Supporting Actor in a Comedy or Drama Series**: **Patrick McGoohan as Col. Lyle C. Rumford in Columbo (NBC): "By Dawn's Early Light"**; Lew Ayres as Beaumont in Kung Fu (ABC): "The Vanishing Image"; Harold Gould as Andrea Basic in Police Story (NBC): "Fathers and Sons"; Harry Morgan as Bartford Hamilton Steele in M*A*S*H (CBS): "The General Flipped at Dawn"	**Outstanding Single Performance** **by a Supporting Actress in a Comedy or Drama Series**: **Zohra Lampert as Marina Sheldon in Kojak (CBS): "Queen of the Gypsies"**; **Cloris Leachman as Phyllis Lindstrom in The Mary Tyler Moore Show (CBS): "Phyllis Whips Inflation"**; Shelley Winters as Thelma in McCloud (NBC): "The Barefoot Girls of Bleecker Street"
**Outstanding Continuing or Single Performance by a Supporting Actor in Variety or Music**: **Jack Albertson in Cher (CBS)**; Tim Conway in The Carol Burnett Show (CBS); John Denver in Doris Day Today (CBS)	**Outstanding Continuing or Single Performance by a Supporting Actress in Variety or Music**: **Cloris Leachman in Cher (CBS)**; Vicki Lawrence in The Carol Burnett Show (CBS); Rita Moreno in Out to Lunch (ABC)

=== Directing ===
Directing
**Outstanding Directing in a Comedy Series**: **M*A*S*H (CBS): "O.R." – Gene Reynolds**; M*A*S*H (CBS): "Alcoholics Unanimous" – Hy Averback; M*A*S*H (CBS): "Bulletin Board" – Alan Alda	**Outstanding Directing in a Drama Series**: **Upstairs, Downstairs (PBS): "A Sudden Storm" – Bill Bain**; Benjamin Franklin (CBS): "The Ambassador" – Glenn Jordan; Kojak (CBS): "Cross Your Heart and Hope to Die" – David Friedkin; Kojak (CBS): "I Want to Report a Dream..." – Telly Savalas; The Streets of San Francisco (ABC): "The Mask of Death" – Harry Falk
**Outstanding Directing in a Comedy-Variety or Music Series**: **The Carol Burnett Show (CBS): "Alan Alda" – Dave Powers**; Cher (CBS): "Bette Midler, Flip Wilson and Elton John" – Art Fisher	**Outstanding Directing in a Comedy-Variety or Music Special**: **An Evening with John Denver (ABC) – Bill Davis**; Ann-Margret Olsson (NBC) – Dwight Hemion; Shirley MacLaine: If They Could See Me Now (CBS) – Robert Scheerer
**Outstanding Directing in a Special Program – Drama or Comedy**: **Love Among the Ruins (ABC) – George Cukor**; The Law (NBC) – John Badham; The Missiles of October (ABC) – Anthony Page; QB VII (ABC) – Tom Gries; Queen of the Stardust Ballroom (CBS) – Sam O'Steen

=== Writing ===
Writing
**Outstanding Writing in a Comedy Series**: **The Mary Tyler Moore Show (CBS): "Will Mary Richards Go to Jail?" – Ed. Weinberger and Stan Daniels**; The Mary Tyler Moore Show (CBS): "Lou and That Woman" – David Lloyd; Rhoda (CBS): "Rhoda's Wedding" – James L. Brooks, Allan Burns, David Davis, Lorenzo Music, Norman Barasch, Carroll Moore and David Lloyd	**Outstanding Writing in a Drama Series**: **Benjamin Franklin (CBS): "The Ambassador" – Howard Fast**; Benjamin Franklin (CBS): "The Whirlwind" – Loring Mandel; Police Story (NBC): "Robbery: 48 Hours" – Robert L. Collins; Upstairs, Downstairs (PBS): "The Bolter" – John Hawkesworth; Upstairs, Downstairs (PBS): "Miss Forrest" – Alfred Shaughnessy
**Outstanding Writing in a Comedy-Variety or Music Special**: **Shirley MacLaine: If They Could See Me Now (CBS)**; Lily (ABC)	**Outstanding Writing in a Comedy-Variety or Music Series**: **The Carol Burnett Show (CBS): "Alan Alda"**; Cher (CBS): "Raquel Welch, Tatum O'Neal and Wayne Rogers"
**Outstanding Writing in a Special Program – Drama or Comedy – Original Teleplay**: **Love Among the Ruins (ABC) – James Costigan**; Hustling (ABC) – Fay Kanin; The Law (NBC) – Story by : William Sackheim and Joel Oliansky Teleplay by : Joel Oliansky; The Missiles of October (ABC) – Stanley R. Greenberg; Queen of the Stardust Ballroom (CBS) – Jerome Kass	**Outstanding Writing in a Special Program – Drama or Comedy – Adaptation**: **Clarence Darrow (NBC) – David W. Rintels**; QB VII (ABC) – Edward Anhalt

== Most major nominations ==
Networks with multiple major nominations (Note: "Major" constitutes the categories listed above: Program, Acting, Directing, and Writing. Does not include the technical categories.)
Network	Number of Nominations
CBS	55
ABC	33
NBC	24

Programs with multiple major nominations
Program	Category	Network	Number of Nominations
M*A*S*H	Comedy	CBS	9
The Mary Tyler Moore Show	Comedy	CBS	8
QB VII	Special	ABC	7
Queen of the Stardust Ballroom	Special	CBS	6
Upstairs, Downstairs	Drama	PBS	6
The Carol Burnett Show	Variety	CBS	5
Cher	Variety	CBS	5
Kojak	Drama	CBS	5
Love Among the Ruins	Special	ABC	5
The Missiles of October	Special	ABC	5
Rhoda	Comedy	CBS	5
All in the Family	Comedy	CBS	4
Benjamin Franklin	Limited	CBS	4
McCloud	Limited	NBC	4
The Streets of San Francisco	Drama	ABC	4
The Waltons	Drama	CBS	4
Columbo	Limited	NBC	3
The Law	Special	NBC	3
Police Story	Drama	NBC	3
Shirley MacLaine: If They Could See Me Now	Variety	CBS	3
Clarence Darrow	Special	NBC	2
The Count of Monte Cristo	Special	NBC	2
An Evening with John Denver	Variety	ABC	2
Hustling	Special	ABC	2
Lily	Variety	ABC	2
McMillan & Wife	Limited	NBC	2
The Odd Couple	Comedy	ABC	2

== Most major awards ==
Networks with multiple major awards
Network	Number of Awards
CBS	16
ABC	10
NBC	5
PBS	3

Programs with multiple major awards
Program	Category	Network	Number of Awards
The Mary Tyler Moore Show	Comedy	CBS	5
Love Among the Ruins	Special	ABC	4
The Carol Burnett Show	Variety	CBS	3
Upstairs, Downstairs	Drama	PBS	3
Benjamin Franklin	Limited	CBS	2
Cher	Variety	CBS	2
Columbo	Limited	NBC	2
An Evening with John Denver	Variety	ABC	2
QB VII	Special	ABC	2
The Waltons	Drama	CBS	2
