= Dave Powers =

Dave Powers may refer to:

- David Powers (1912–1998), special assistant to John F. Kennedy
- Dave Powers (director) (1933–2008), American television director and producer
