= Directors Guild of America Award for Outstanding Directorial Achievement in Variety/Talk/News/Sports – Regularly Scheduled Programming =

Annual award for television directing

- Awarded for: Outstanding Directorial Achievement in Variety/Talk/News/Sports – Regularly Scheduled Programming
- Country: United States
- Presented by: Directors Guild of America
- First award: 2013
- Currently held by: Liz Patrick for Saturday Night Live (2024)

The Directors Guild of America Award for Outstanding Directorial Achievement in Variety/Talk/News/Sports – Regularly Scheduled Programming is one of the annual Directors Guild of America Awards given by the Directors Guild of America. It was first awarded at the 66th Directors Guild of America Awards in 2014.

== Winners and nominees ==
=== 2010s ===
Year	Program	Episode	Winners and nominees	Network	Ref.
2013 (66th)	Saturday Night Live	"Host: Justin Timberlake"	Don Roy King	NBC	
2013 (66th)	The Colbert Report	"#10004"	Jim Hoskinson	Comedy Central	
2013 (66th)	The Daily Show with John Stewart	"#19018"	Chuck O'Neil	Comedy Central	
2013 (66th)	Jimmy Kimmel Live!	"#13-1810"	Andy Fisher	ABC	
2013 (66th)	Late Night with Jimmy Fallon	"#799"	Dave Diomedi	NBC	
2014 (67th)	The Tonight Show Starring Jimmy Fallon	"Episode #1"	Dave Diomedi	NBC	
2014 (67th)	The Colbert Report	"#11040"	Jim Hoskinson	Comedy Central	
2014 (67th)	The Daily Show with John Stewart	"Open-Carrying to the Midterms"	Chuck O'Neil	Comedy Central	
2014 (67th)	Real Time with Bill Maher	"#1226"	Paul G. Casey	HBO	
2014 (67th)	Saturday Night Live	"Host Jim Carrey/Musical Guest Iggy Azalea"	Don Roy King	NBC	
2015 (68th)	The Tonight Show Starring Jimmy Fallon	"Episode #325"	Dave Diomedi	NBC	
2015 (68th)	The Daily Show with John Stewart	"Episode #20142"	Brady Connell	Comedy Central	
2015 (68th)	Inside Amy Schumer	"12 Angry Men"	Ryan McFaul and Amy Schumer	Comedy Central	
2015 (68th)	Real Time with Bill Maher	"#1334"	Paul G. Casey	HBO	
2015 (68th)	Saturday Night Live	"Host Tracy Morgan/Musical Guest Demi Lovato"	Don Roy King	NBC	
2016 (69th)	Saturday Night Live	"Host: Dave Chappelle"	Don Roy King	NBC	
2016 (69th)	CBS News Sunday Morning	"Charles Osgood Farewell Broadcast"	Nora Gerard	CBS	
2016 (69th)	Full Frontal with Samantha Bee	"Episode #1030"	Paul Pennolino	TBS	
2016 (69th)	The Late Show with Stephen Colbert	"Episode #0179"	Jim Hoskinson	CBS	
2016 (69th)	Real Time with Bill Maher	"Show #1437"	Paul G. Casey	HBO	
2017 (70th)	Saturday Night Live	"Host: Jimmy Fallon"	Don Roy King	NBC	
2017 (70th)	Full Frontal with Samantha Bee	"#2061"	Andre Allen	TBS	
2017 (70th)	Last Week Tonight with John Oliver	"French Elections"	Paul Pennolino	HBO	
2017 (70th)	The Late Show with Stephen Colbert	"Joe Biden/Elton John"	Jim Hoskinson	CBS	
2017 (70th)	Real Time with Bill Maher	"#1527"	Paul G. Casey	HBO	
2018 (71st)	Saturday Night Live	"Host: Adam Driver"	Don Roy King	NBC	
2018 (71st)	Last Week Tonight with John Oliver	"Italian Election"	Paul Pennolino	HBO	
2018 (71st)	The Late Show with Stephen Colbert	"#480"	Jim Hoskinson	CBS	
2018 (71st)	Real Time with Bill Maher	"#1633"	Paul G. Casey	HBO	
2018 (71st)	Who Is America?	"Episode 102"	Sacha Baron Cohen, Nathan Fielder, Daniel Gray Longino, and Dan Mazer	Showtime	
2019 (72nd)	Saturday Night Live	"Eddie Murphy/Lizzo"	Don Roy King	NBC	
2019 (72nd)	CBS Sunday Morning	"40th Anniversary"	Nora S. Gerard	CBS	
2019 (72nd)	Last Week Tonight with John Oliver	"SLAPP Suits"	Paul Pennolino and Christopher Werner	HBO	
2019 (72nd)	The Late Show with Stephen Colbert	"Alexandria Ocasio-Cortez/Incubus"	Jim Hoskinson	CBS	
2019 (72nd)	Real Time with Bill Maher	"#1730"	Paul G. Casey	HBO	

=== 2020s ===
Year	Program	Episode	Winners and nominees	Network	Ref.
2020 (73rd)	Saturday Night Live	"Dave Chappelle/Foo Fighters"	Don Roy King	NBC	
2020 (73rd)	The Daily Show with Trevor Noah	"President Obama: Inspiring Future Leaders & 'A Promised Land'"	David Paul Meyer	Comedy Central	
2020 (73rd)	Last Week Tonight with John Oliver	"Trump & Election Results"	Christopher Werner	HBO	
2020 (73rd)	The Late Show with Stephen Colbert	"#1025 Live Show Following Capitol Insurrection"	Jim Hoskinson	CBS	
2020 (73rd)	Real Time with Bill Maher	"#1835"	Paul G. Casey	HBO	
2021 (74th)	Saturday Night Live	"Keegan-Michael Key/Olivia Rodrigo"	Don Roy King	NBC	
2021 (74th)	The Daily Show with Trevor Noah	"#26112"	David Paul Meyer	Comedy Central	
2021 (74th)	Last Week Tonight with John Oliver	"#830"	Paul Pennolino and Christopher Werner	HBO	
2021 (74th)	The Late Show with Stephen Colbert	"#1105"	Jim Hoskinson	CBS	
2021 (74th)	Real Time with Bill Maher	"#1935"	Paul G. Casey	HBO	
2022 (75th)	Saturday Night Live	"Jack Harlow"	Liz Patrick	NBC	
2022 (75th)	The Daily Show with Trevor Noah	"Brandi Carlile Discusses Her New Deluxe Album and Performs 'You and Me on the Rock'"	David Paul Meyer	Comedy Central	
2022 (75th)	Last Week Tonight with John Oliver	"Afghanistan"	Paul Pennolino	HBO	
2022 (75th)	The Late Show with Stephen Colbert	"#1333"	Jim Hoskinson	CBS	
2022 (75th)	Real Time with Bill Maher	"#2010"	Paul G. Casey	HBO	
2023 (76th)	Saturday Night Live	"Pedro Pascal / Coldplay"	Michael Mancini and Liz Patrick	NBC	
2023 (76th)	The Daily Show with Trevor Noah	"Singer Charley Crockett Performs "Name on a Billboard" and Discusses New Album with Jordan Klepper"	David Paul Meyer	Comedy Central	
2023 (76th)	Last Week Tonight with John Oliver	"Dollar Stores"	Paul Pennolino	HBO	
2023 (76th)	The Late Show with Stephen Colbert	"Jan. 19, 2023: Rep. Adam Kinzinger; Meet Me at the Altar; Special appearance by Harvey Guillén"	Jim Hoskinson	CBS	
2023 (76th)	Real Time with Bill Maher	"#2117"	Paul G. Casey	HBO	
2024 (77th)	Saturday Night Live	"John Mulaney / Chappell Roan"	Liz Patrick	NBC	
2024 (77th)	The Daily Show	"Indecision 2024: The Democratic National Convention – Plot Twist!"	David Paul Meyer	Comedy Central	
2024 (77th)	Last Week Tonight with John Oliver	"India Elections"	Paul Pennolino	HBO	
2024 (77th)	The Late Show with Stephen Colbert	"Rep. Alexandria Ocasio‑Cortez & Mavis Staples w/ Jeff Tweedy"	Jim Hoskinson	CBS	
2024 (77th)	Real Time with Bill Maher	"Jiminy Glick, Andrew Cuomo, Adam Kinzinger"	Paul G. Casey	HBO	

== Programs with multiple awards ==
10 awards

- Saturday Night Live

2 awards

- The Tonight Show Starring Jimmy Fallon

== Programs with multiple nominations ==
12 nominations

- Saturday Night Live

11 nominations

- Real Time with Bill Maher

9 nominations

- The Late Show with Stephen Colbert

8 nominations

- The Daily Show
- Last Week Tonight with John Oliver

2 nominations

- CBS Sunday Morning
- The Colbert Report
- Full Frontal with Samantha Bee
- The Tonight Show Starring Jimmy Fallon

== Individuals with multiple awards ==
7 awards

- Don Roy King

3 awards

- Liz Patrick

2 awards

- Dave Diomedi

== Individuals with multiple nominations ==
11 nominations

- Paul G. Casey
- Jim Hoskinson

9 nominations

- Don Roy King

8 nominations

- Paul Pennolino

5 nominations

- David Paul Meyer

3 nominations

- Dave Diomedi
- Liz Patrick
- Christopher Werner

2 nominations

- Nora S. Gerard
- Chuck O'Neil

== Total awards by network ==
- NBC – 12

== See also ==
- Directors Guild of America Award for Outstanding Directing – Variety Specials
