= Roger Englander =

American director and producer (1926–2021)

- Born: November 23, 1926; Cleveland, Ohio, U.S.
- Died: February 8, 2021 (aged 94); Newport, Rhode Island, U.S.
- Education: University of Chicago
- Occupations: Director, producer

Roger Leslie Englander (November 23, 1926 – February 8, 2021) was an American director and producer. He was nominated six times for Primetime Emmy Awards, winning in the category Outstanding Program Achievements in Entertainment in 1965.

Born in Clevelend, Ohio, Englander attended Cleveland Heights High School where he studied piano, trumpet and French horn; he also conducted the school orchestra. He studied drama, composition and theory at the University of Chicago and graduated in 1945.

Englander produced all 53 episodes for Leonard Bernstein's Young People's Concerts at CBS from 1958 until 1972. Earlier, he was the prop manager for Bernstein's production of Britten's Peter Grimes at Tanglewood in 1946. He staged several of Menotti's operas, including The Telephone and The Medium for WPTZ (Philadelphia). Englander wrote the book Opera, What's All the Screaming About? in 1983. He also directed several episodes of Omnibus and produced episodes of The Bell Telephone Hour, which earned him a Peabody Award in 1959.

Englander died in February 2021, of pneumonia at a hospital in Newport, Rhode Island, at the age of 94.
