= Walter C. Miller =

Television producer and director (1926–2020)

Walter Charles Miller (March 15, 1926 – November 13, 2020) was a television producer and director, whose works span from the mid-1960s until 2020. Miller won numerous Emmy Awards throughout his career.

In 2009, Miller received The Country Music Association's "Irving Waugh Award of Excellence". Miller was recognized for his 40-years of working with the CMA Awards, as producer, executive producer, and consulting producer. Miller reported later that he was completely surprised by the honor, which was attended by Brad Paisley, Martina McBride and 12-time CMA Awards host Vince Gill along with industry and CMA Board leaders. Miller died at the age of 94 in 2020.

== Selected filmography ==
- Dames at Sea, 1971 TV adaptation of stage musical (director)
