= Jim Hoskinson =

American television director

Jim Hoskinson is an American television director. His credits include The Colbert Report on Comedy Central, The Late Show with Stephen Colbert on CBS, and Last Week Tonight with John Oliver on HBO. Stephen Colbert often called for him on-screen as "Jim" or "Jimmy" for minor assistance during The Late Show, which he had also done in-character on The Colbert Report.

== Background ==
Hoskinson is from Connecticut. He began his television career as a cable puller for a Disney show. He later went to work for CBS's Inside Edition when Bill O'Reilly was anchor. He then had a six-year directing stint at Fox News. Because of this experience, he was hired for the job on The Colbert Report, which was heavily modeled on pundits like O'Reilly and networks like Fox. In 2015 he became a director of The Late Show with Stephen Colbert on CBS, following Colbert, who had left Comedy Central in 2014. Hoskinson retired from the show in 2025, and was succeeded by Yvonne De Mare.

== Accolades ==
As of 2026, Hoskinson has been nominated for fourteen Primetime Emmy Awards and twelve Directors Guild of America awards. He won the Primetime Emmy Award for Outstanding Directing for a Variety Series in 2025.
