= Jerry Foley =

American television director and producer (1955–2024)

- Born: 1955
- Died: March 10, 2024 (aged 68); Albany, New York, U.S.
- Occupations: Television director and producer
- Notable work: Late Show with David Letterman

Jerry Foley (1955 – March 10, 2024) was an American television director and producer. He directed the Late Show with David Letterman from 1995 until the end of the show's run.

Foley was the executive producer and director of the Live on Letterman concert series before it ended in 2015. He was named Supervising Producer in May 2003.

Foley had nine DGA Award nominations and 21 Emmy nominations—a record for a single person working on a variety series.

== Early career ==
After graduating from the University of Southern California, Foley spent thirteen years at NBC working in a variety of functions on NBC News Overnight, NBC News at Sunrise, Today, Saturday Night Live, Tomorrow with Tom Snyder, Late Night with David Letterman, Later with Bob Costas, Friday Night Videos, NBC Nightly News, WNBC News 4 New York, Live at Five, NFL Live, NBC Game of the Week, and Another World.

== Letterman era ==
Foley was the technical director of Late Night with David Letterman from 1988 to 1993. When the show ended in 1993, and David Letterman moved to CBS to host the Late Show with David Letterman, he informed his crew at Late Night about the move in advance, and told them, "To those of you who are able, we'd love to have you come along." Foley was one of the crew members that moved to CBS with Letterman.

Foley succeeded Hal Gurnee as the director of the Late Show in 1995. He directed the show until its conclusion in 2015.

== Other work ==
Foley directed over 3900 hours of late night television. He worked with film, television, and music talent in numerous single camera comedy segments. He produced and directed all 72 episodes of Live on Letterman including concerts with The Black Keys, The Killers, Adele, Phoenix, Taylor Swift, and Tim McGraw. Foley produced and directed over 40 Broadway performances for The Late Show including Wicked, Pippin, The Adams Family, Hedwig and the Angry Inch, Hair, Young Frankenstein, and Cinderella. He was the executive producer and director of CBS News: 50 Years Later, Civil Rights and The Beatles 50 Years Later: How CBS is Remembering the Fab Four.

Jerry Foley directed episodes of ABC's The View and Broadway segments for Good Morning America. He was the producer and director of the "America Salutes You" benefit concert. In August 2016, Foley was named Artistic Director of the North Fork TV Festival. Jerry Foley directed the NBC primetime special Tony Bennett Celebrates 90: The Best Is Yet to Come.

== Personal life and death ==
Foley was the younger brother of film director James Foley.

Jerry Foley died on March 10, 2024, at the age of 68, after a skiing accident in Vermont.

== Primetime Emmy nominations ==
- 2013, Nominated for Outstanding Directing for a Variety Series for The Late Show with David Letterman
- 2012, Nominated for Outstanding Directing for a Variety Series for The Late Show with David Letterman
- 2011, Nominated for Outstanding Directing for a Variety, Music or Comedy Series for The Late Show with David Letterman
- 2010, Nominated for Outstanding Directing for a Variety, Music or Comedy Series for The Late Show with David Letterman
- 2009, Nominated for Outstanding Directing for a Variety, Music or Comedy Series for The Late Show with David Letterman
- 2009, Nominated for Outstanding Variety, Music or Comedy Series for The Late Show with David Letterman (Producer)
- 2008, Nominated for Outstanding Variety, Music or Comedy Series for The Late Show with David Letterman (Producer)
- 2007, Nominated for Outstanding Variety, Music or Comedy Series for The Late Show with David Letterman (Producer)
- 2006, Nominated for Outstanding Variety, Music or Comedy Series for The Late Show with David Letterman (Producer)
- 2005, Nominated for Outstanding Directing for a Variety, Music or Comedy Series for The Late Show with David Letterman
- 2005, Nominated for Outstanding Variety, Music or Comedy Series for The Late Show with David Letterman (Producer)
- 2004, Nominated for Outstanding Directing for a Variety, Music or Comedy Series for The Late Show with David Letterman
- 2004, Nominated for Outstanding Variety, Music or Comedy Series for The Late Show with David Letterman (Producer)
- 2003, Nominated for Outstanding Directing for a Variety, Music or Comedy Series for The Late Show with David Letterman
- 2003, Nominated for Outstanding Variety, Music or Comedy Series for The Late Show with David Letterman (Producer)
- 2002, Nominated for Outstanding Directing for a Variety, Music or Comedy Series for The Late Show with David Letterman
- 2001, Nominated for Outstanding Directing for a Variety, Music or Comedy Series for The Late Show with David Letterman
- 2000, Nominated for Outstanding Directing for a Variety, Music or Comedy Series for The Late Show with David Letterman
- 1996, Nominated for Outstanding Individual Achievement in Directing for a Variety, Music or Comedy Series for The Late Show with David Letterman
- 1995, Nominated for Outstanding Technical Direction/Camera/Video for a Series for The Late Show with David Letterman
- 1994, Nominated for Outstanding Technical Direction/Camera/Video for a Series for The Late Show with David Letterman

== DGA Award nominations ==
- 2007, Nominated for Outstanding Directing for a Musical Variety Program
- 2005, Nominated for Outstanding Directing for a Musical Variety Program
- 2004, Nominated for Outstanding Directing for a Musical Variety Program
- 2002, Nominated for Outstanding Directing for a Musical Variety Program
- 2001, Nominated for Outstanding Directing for a Musical Variety Program
- 2000, Nominated for Outstanding Directing for a Musical Variety Program
- 1999, Nominated for Outstanding Directing for a Musical Variety Program
- 1998, Nominated for Outstanding Directing for a Musical Variety Program
