= Bucky Gunts =

Brent "Bucky" Gunts is a multiple Emmy-winning sports television director currently serving as Head of Production for NBC Olympics.

He is a director for NBC's Olympics coverage and has won four Primetime Emmy Awards for Outstanding Directing for a Variety, Music or Comedy Special for NBC's coverage of the opening ceremony at various games, most recently for the 2010 Winter Olympics in Vancouver. The 2010 award was presented at the televised ceremony by Ricky Gervais, who joked about the director's name.

Gunts also directs NBC's primetime studio coverage throughout the Olympic Games, and has directed the Football Night in America studio show and NBC's golf coverage. He previously served as a director of the NBA on NBC, the network's baseball coverage, and The Today Show. According to NBC, he had won a total of twenty Emmy Awards as of February 2010.
