= Dave Powers (director) =

American television director (1932–2008)

- Born: David Price Powers; December 2, 1932; Big Bear Lake, California, U.S.
- Died: July 3, 2008 (aged 75); Palm Desert, California, U.S.
- Occupations: Television director, television producer
- Years active: 1966–1993

David Price Powers (December 2, 1932 – July 3, 2008) was an American television director and producer.

== Life and career ==
Powers was born in Big Bear Lake, California, and broke into show business working as an usher on The Dinah Shore Show, 1956. He later worked as an associate director before being hired by Carol Burnett in 1968 to direct her variety program, CBS-TV's The Carol Burnett Show. He remained with the show through its entire ten-year run and also directed Burnett in a number of prime-time specials. Powers then went on to direct many episodes of the successful television programs Mama's Family and Three's Company (both from Season 3 up to and including their series finales), as well as the Three's Company spinoffs The Ropers (Season 1) and Three's a Crowd (its entire lone season). Powers won four Emmys (1974,1975,1977, and 1978) for directing, and received three additional nominations, and was also nominated twice for Directors Guild of America awards. Powers, who became a member of the Directors Guild of America in 1956, remained a member for 52 years. In addition to her variety series, Powers directed Burnett in two CBS-TV specials, Sills and Burnett at the Met, with Beverly Sills, for which he was nominated for another Emmy, as well as Julie and Carol at Lincoln Center, with Julie Andrews.

Powers's daughter Debra Lee Vowell (born October 27, 1957) disappeared in January 1979 while on a boating trip off the California coast.

Powers died July 3, 2008, in Palm Desert, California, of skin cancer.
