= Rikki Hughes =

American TV producer and showrunner

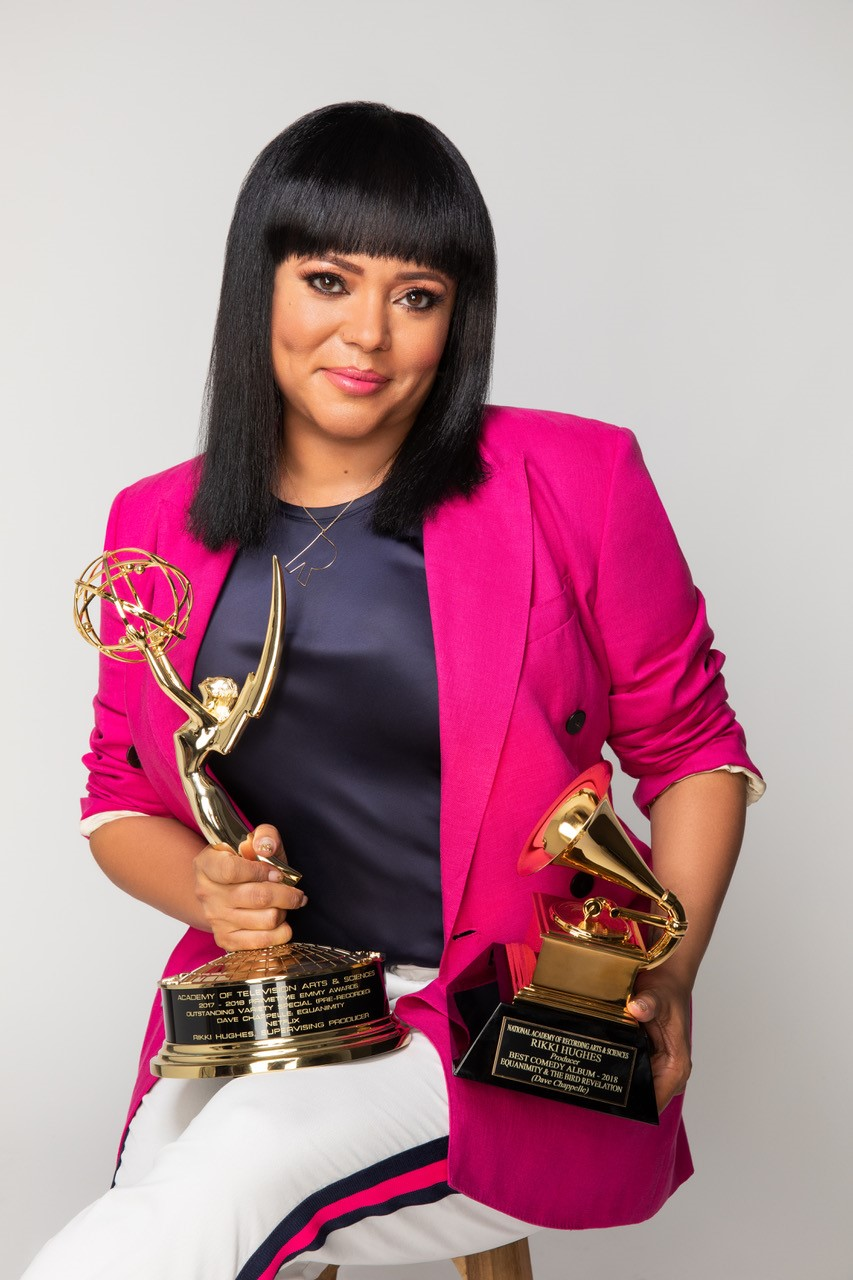
Hughes in 2018.

Rikki Hughes (born August 3, 1971) is an American television producer and showrunner. She is best known for producing a number of comedy specials, award shows, television series, and independent features such as the BET 25th Anniversary Special (2005), It's Pimpin' Pimpin' (2008), Bill Bellamy's Who's Got Jokes? (2006-2009), The Age of Spin & Deep in the Heart of Texas (2017), Equanimity (2017), The Bird Revelation (2017), Sticks and Stones (2019), 8:46 (2020), and The Fresh Prince of Bel-Air Reunion (2020).

Hughes currently serves as the showrunner for HBO Max's streetwear design competition series The Hype (2021–present) with Migos' Offset and also executive produced HBO Max's 2022 game show About Last Night, hosted by Ayesha Curry and NBA star Stephen Curry.

== Career ==
=== Early career ===
Upon graduating from the University of Washington in 1992, Hughes had planned to attend medical school at the University of California, Los Angeles, but changed trajectories after getting a job as assistant tour manager for Warren G. She stayed in the music industry for several years, eventually running the international department for Priority Records until she decided in 2001 to start a career in television production.

=== Television ===
After leaving the music business, Hughes started off as a segment producer for Dance 360 and Baggin. By the end of 2005, she had been credited as a producer for FOX's The Big Black Comedy Show, Volumes 2–4, the BET Comedy Awards, and 25 Strong: The BET Silver Anniversary Special. In 2007, Hughes produced Bobby Jones Comedy All Stars: Volume 1 and Baisden After Dark, which she followed up with Katt Williams' It's Pimpin' Pimpin' and Bill Bellamy's Who's Got Jokes?.

Hughes' earlier work with BET in 2005 and 2006 led to her role as BET's go-to-producer throughout the 2010s for their television specials including Rip the Runway, BET Hip-Hop Awards, and BET Honors.

Following the conclusion of her work with BET in 2016, Hughes produced the ABFF Awards: A Celebration of Hollywood, Grown & Sexy, Fusion TV's All Def Digital's Roast of America, and Fusion's Snoop Dogg Roast Snoop Dogg Smokeout. In 2017, she produced six episodes of All Def Comedy, Comedy Central's series Hood Adjacent with James Davis, and Blind Basketball. Hughes produced the miniseries Snitchin in 2018 and BET's music competition series The Next Big Thing in 2019. In 2020, she produced the ABFF Awards, Def Comedy Jam Healing Through Laugher, Tribute to Andre Harrell: Mr. Champagne & Bubbles, VOMO: Vote or Miss Out, which was organized by former first lady Michelle Obama, Our OWN Christmas, and IHeartRadio's Living Black!

Hughes is a frequent producer for comedian Dave Chappelle. In 2017, she produced The Age of Spin: Dave Chappelle Live at the Hollywood Palladium, The Bird Revelation, and Equanimity. In 2019, Hughes produced Chappelle's Netflix specials Sticks and Stones, followed by 8:46 in 2020.

Most recently, Hughes served as the showrunner for The Fresh Prince of Bel-Air Reunion on HBO Max and currently is the showrunner for HBO Max's streetwear design competition series The Hype, which premiered on August 12, 2021.

She is the executive producer and owner of Magic Lemonade Productions, a production company that specializes in television, film and new media. In 2021, Hughes and her Magic Lemonade team took over production for Bounce TV's The Trumpet Awards and the reimagining of The Essence Awards.

=== Film ===
Hughes executive produced the 2016 comedy film #DigitalLivesMatter, which starred D.C. Young Fly.

== Personal life ==
Hughes is based in Los Angeles and Atlanta.

== Filmography ==
Year	Title	Credited as	Notes
2004	Dance 360	Segment Producer	
2004	Baggin'	Segment Producer	
2005	The Big Black Comedy Show, Vol. 2	Associate Producer	
2005	The Big Black Comedy Show, Vol. 3	Associate Producer	
2005	2005 BET Comedy Awards	Producer	
2005	25 Strong: The BET Silver Anniversary Special	Executive Producer	Post Show
2005	The Big Black Comedy Show, Vol. 4: Live from Los Angeles	Producer	
2006	The Big Black Comedy Show, Vol. 5	Producer	
2006	2006 BET Awards Nominations Live	Producer	
2006	BET Awards 2006	Executive Producer	Results Show
2007	Bobby Jones Comedy All Stars: Volume 1	Executive Producer	
2007-2008	Baisden After Dark	Co-Executive Producer	13 episodes
2008	Katt Williams: It's Pimpin' Pimpin'	Consulting Producer	
2008	Are U Serious?: Best of Shawn Morgan	Co-Executive Producer	
2006-2009	Who's Got Jokes?	Co-Executive Producer	32 episodes
2010	Rip the Runway	Supervising Producer	
2011	Rip the Runway '11	Supervising Producer	
2011	Young Jeezy: A Hustlerz Ambition	Executive Producer	
2012	The BET Honors	Producer	
2012	Rip the Runway	Supervising Producer	
2013	The BET Honors	Supervising Producer	
2013	Rip the Runway	Supervising Producer	
2014	The American Dream: Hillary Clinton Writing a New Chapter	Executive Producer	
2015	The BET Honors	Supervising Producer	
2016	ABFF Awards: A Celebration of Hollywood	Co-Executive Producer	
2016	The BET Honors	Supervising Producer	
2016	Dear Mama	Executive Producer	
2016	#DigitalLivesMatter	Executive Producer	
2016	Grown & Sexy	Executive Producer	
2016	All Def Digital's Roast of America	Supervising Producer	
2016	All Def Comedy	Executive Producer	
2016	Fusion's Snoop Dogg Roast Snoop Dogg Smokeout	Executive Producer	
2017	The Age of Spin: Dave Chappelle Live at the Hollywood Palladium	Supervising Producer	
2017	Hood Adjacent with James Davis	Executive Producer	8 episodes
2017	Blind Basketball: It's Game Day!!!	Executive Producer	3 episodes
2017	All Def Comedy	Supervising Producer	6 episodes
2017	Dave Chappelle: Equanimity	Supervising Producer	
2017	Dave Chappelle: The Bird Revelation	Supervising Producer	
2018	Snitchin	Executive Producer	
2018	The Next Big Thing	Executive Producer	
2019	Dave Chappelle: Sticks & Stones	Co-Executive Producer/Producer	
2019	Mind of EP	Executive Producer	4 episodes
2019	Epilogue: The Punchline	Co-Executive Producer	
2020	28th Annual Trumpet Awards	Executive Producer	
2020	ABFF Honors	Executive Producer	
2020	Def Comedy Jam Healing Through Laughter	Producer	
2020	A Tribute to Andre Harrell: Mr. Champagne & Bubbles	Executive Producer	
2020	VOMO: Vote or Miss Out	Executive Producer	
2020	The Fresh Prince of Bel-Air Reunion	Executive Producer	
2020	Our OWN Christmas	Executive Producer	
2020	29th Annual Trumpet Awards	Executive Producer	
2021	Living Black!	Executive Producer	
2021–Present	The Hype	Executive Producer	8 episodes
2022	Dave Chappelle: What's In a Name?	Executive Producer, Director	

== Awards and nominations ==
Since 2018, Hughes has won two Emmy Awards, three Grammy Awards, and is the first African-American woman in Emmy history to win the category of Outstanding Variety Special (Pre-Recorded). In 2018, she won her first Emmy Award for Equanimity and won her second Emmy Award in 2020 for Sticks & Stones. Hughes won each of her three Grammy Awards back-to-back in the category of Best Comedy Album for Equanimity and The Bird Revelation at the 61st Annual Grammy Awards in 2018 and for Sticks & Stones at the 62nd Annual Grammy Awards in 2019.

She has been nominated for three NAACP Image Awards as well as a Producers Guild of America Award. In 2021, she has been nominated for another Emmy Award in the category of Outstanding Variety Special (Pre-Recorded) for her work with Dave Chappelle for 8:46.

In 2021, Hughes was honored by Culture Creators at their fifth annual "Innovators & Leaders" Awards Brunch, where she was a recipient of their Icon Award for her accomplishments throughout the entertainment industry.
