= List of awards and nominations received by Dave Chappelle =

Dave Chappelle awards and nominations
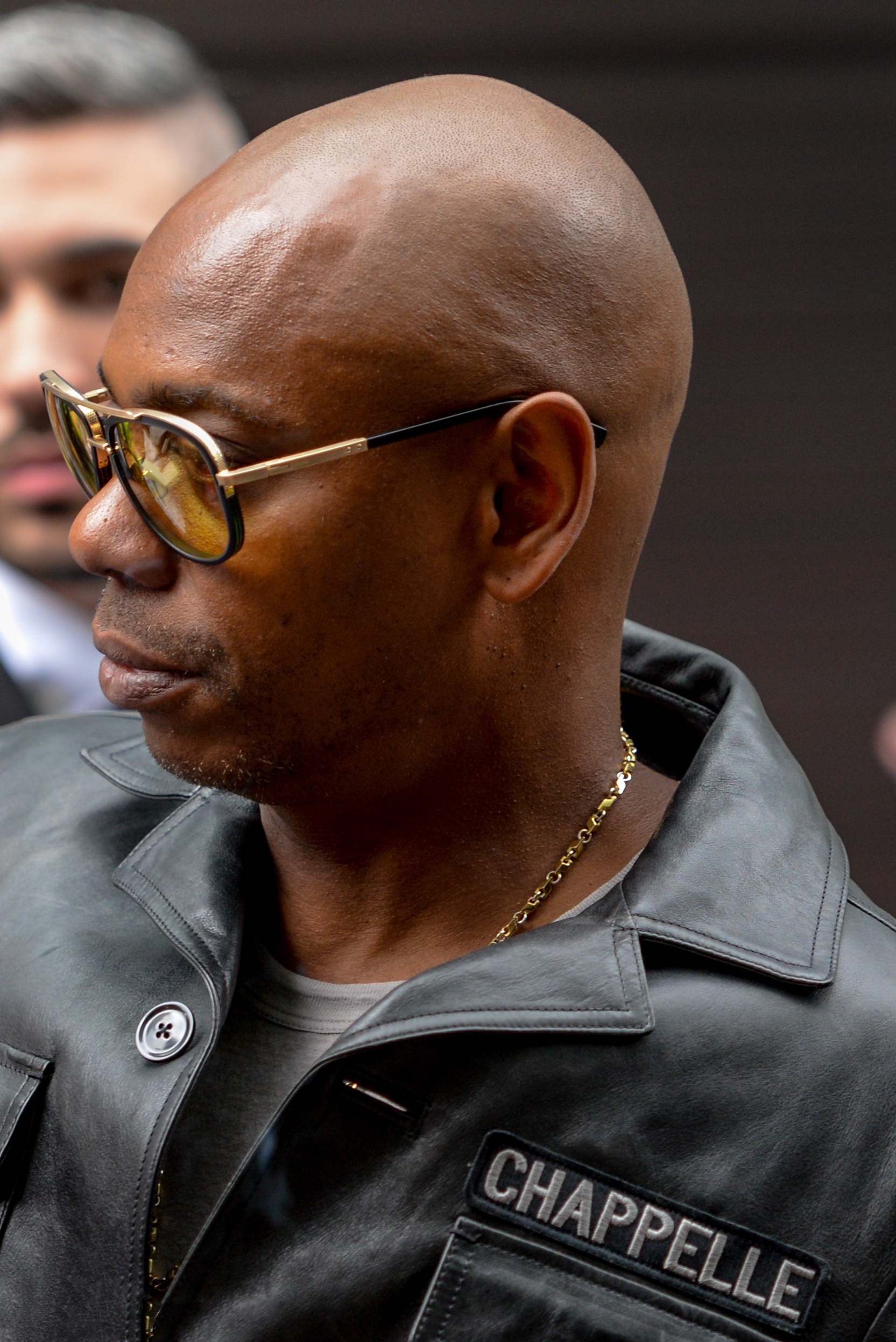
- Chappelle at the 2018 Toronto International Film Festival
Awards and nominations
Award	Wins	Nominations
Emmy Awards	5	12
Grammy Awards	6	7
Screen Actors Guild Awards	0	1

Totals (Note: Certain award groups do not simply award one winner. They acknowledge several different recipients, have runners-up, and have third place. Since this is a specific recognition and is different from losing an award, runner-up mentions are considered wins in this award tally. For simplification and to avoid errors, each award in this list has been presumed to have had a prior nomination.)
- Wins: 14
- Nominations: 36

This article is a List of awards and nominations received by Dave Chappelle.

Dave Chappelle is an American stand up comedian and actor. Over the course of his career he has received numerous awards and honors for his iconic work including five Primetime Emmy Awards and six Grammy Awards as well as a nomination for a Screen Actors Guild Award. In 2019, he received the Mark Twain Prize for American Humor, which is presented by the Kennedy Center as America's highest comedy honor.

He is most notable for his satirical sketch show, Chappelle's Show which lasted from 2003 to 2005. He received his first Emmy Award in 2017 for his guest appearance on Saturday Night Live. In 2018, he received a Grammy Award for his Netflix-produced comedy album The Age of Spin and Deep in the Heart of Texas. Equanimity, another Netflix special, was nominated in 2018 for three Emmys and received the award for Outstanding Variety Special (Pre-Recorded). In 2020, Sticks & Stones earned Chappelle his third consecutive Grammy Award for Best Comedy Album.

== Major awards ==
=== Emmy Awards ===
Year	Category	Nominated work	Result	Ref.
Primetime Emmy Awards
2004	Outstanding Variety, Music or Comedy Series	Chappelle's Show	Nominated	
2004	Outstanding Writing for a Variety Series	Chappelle's Show	Nominated	
2005	Outstanding Variety, Music or Comedy Special	Dave Chappelle: For What it's Worth	Nominated	
2017	Outstanding Guest Actor in a Comedy Series	Saturday Night Live: Dave Chappelle/A Tribe Called Quest	Won	
2018	Outstanding Variety Special (Pre-Recorded)	Dave Chappelle: Equanimity	Won	
2020	Outstanding Variety Special (Pre-Recorded)	Dave Chappelle: Sticks and Stones	Won	
2020	Outstanding Writing for a Variety Special	Dave Chappelle: Sticks and Stones	Won	
2021	Outstanding Guest Actor in a Comedy Series	Saturday Night Live: Dave Chappelle/Foo Fighters	Won	
2021	Outstanding Variety Special (Pre-Recorded)	Dave Chappelle: 8:46	Nominated	
2021	Outstanding Directing for a Variety Special	Dave Chappelle: 8:46	Nominated	
2021	Outstanding Writing for a Variety Special	Dave Chappelle: 8:46	Nominated	
2022	Outstanding Variety Special (Pre-Recorded)	Dave Chappelle: The Closer	Nominated	

=== Grammy Awards ===
Year	Category	Nominated work	Result	Ref.
2018	Best Comedy Album	Dave Chappelle: The Age of Spin	Won	
2019	Best Comedy Album	Dave Chappelle: Equanimity & The Bird Revelation	Won	
2020	Best Comedy Album	Dave Chappelle: Sticks & Stones	Won	
2022	Best Spoken Word Album	8:46 (Shared with Amir Sulaiman)	Nominated	
2023	Best Comedy Album	Dave Chappelle: The Closer	Won	
2024	Best Comedy Album	Dave Chappelle: What's In A Name?	Won	
2025	Best Comedy Album	Dave Chappelle: The Dreamer	Won	

=== Screen Actors Guild Awards ===
Year	Category	Nominated work	Result	Ref.
2019	Outstanding Performance by a Cast in a Motion Picture	A Star Is Born	Nominated	

=== Producers Guild of America ===
Year	Category	Nominated work	Result	Ref.
2005	Outstanding Producer of Variety Television	Chappelle's Show	Nominated	
2020	Outstanding Producer of Live Entertainment & Talk TV	Dave Chappelle: Sticks and Stones	Nominated	

== Miscellaneous awards ==
=== Teen Choice Awards ===
Year	Category	Nominated work	Result	Ref.
2004	Choice TV Show: Late Night	Chappelle's Show	Nominated	
2004	Choice TV Show: Breakout	Chappelle's Show	Nominated	
2004	Choice Comedian	Chappelle's Show	Nominated	
2005	Choice Comedian	Dave Chappelle	Nominated	

=== NAACP Image Awards ===
Year	Category	Nominated work	Result	Ref.
2004	Outstanding Variety (Series or Special)	Chappelle's Show	Nominated	
2004	Outstanding Actor in a Comedy Series	Chappelle's Show	Nominated	
2005	Outstanding Comedy Series	Chappelle's Show	Nominated	
2005	Outstanding Actor in a Comedy Series	Chappelle's Show	Nominated	
2005	Outstanding Variety (Series or Special)	Dave Chappelle: For What It's Worth	Nominated	
2018	Outstanding Variety or Game Show – (Series or Special)	Dave Chappelle: The Age of Spin	Nominated	

=== NAMIC Vision Awards ===
Year	Category	Nominated work	Result	Ref.
2004	Best Comedic Performance	Chappelle's Show	Won	
2005	Comedy	Chappelle's Show	Won	
2005	Best Comedic Performance	Chappelle's Show	Won	
2005	Comedy	Dave Chappelle: For What It's Worth	Nominated	

=== Black Reel Awards ===
Year	Category	Nominated work	Result	Ref.
2017	Outstanding Guest Performer, Comedy Series	Saturday Night Live	Won	

=== DVD Exclusive Awards ===
Year	Category	Nominated work	Result	Ref.
2006	Overall DVD, TV Program	Chappelle's Show	Nominated	
2006	Best Deleted Scenes, Outtakes and Bloopers	Chappelle's Show	Nominated	

== Special honors ==
Year	Award	Result	Ref.
2019	Mark Twain Prize for American Humor	Honored	
