= Leslie Jones (comedian) =

American comedian and actress (born 1967)

- Born: Annette Leslie Jones; September 7, 1967 (age 59); Memphis, Tennessee, U.S.
- Notable work: Saturday Night Live cast member and writer (2014-2019); Ghostbusters (2016); Coming 2 America (2021); Good Burger 2 (2023)

Comedy career
- Years active: 1987–present
- Medium: Stand-up; film; television
- Genres: Observational comedy; blue comedy; black comedy; physical comedy; racial humor; satire
- Subjects: African-American culture; everyday life; pop culture; current events

Annette Leslie Jones (born September 7, 1967) is an American stand-up comedian and actress. She was a cast member and writer for the NBC sketch comedy series Saturday Night Live from 2014 to 2019, and hosted the ABC game show Supermarket Sweep. She has also been a featured performer at the Just for Laughs festival in Montreal and the Aspen Comedy Festival. In 2010, her one-hour comedy special, Problem Child, was broadcast on Showtime. Jones starred in Ghostbusters (2016) as Patty Tolan. In 2017 and 2018, Jones was nominated for a Primetime Emmy Award for Outstanding Supporting Actress in a Comedy Series for her work on Saturday Night Live.

== Early life ==
Jones was born on September 7, 1967, in Memphis, Tennessee. She had a younger brother, Rodney Keith Jones (1971–2009). Her father, Willie Jones Jr., was in the United States Army, and her family relocated frequently. Her family moved to Los Angeles, when her father took a job at Stevie Wonder's radio station, KJLH, as an electronics engineer. Jones attended high school in Lynwood, California, where she also played basketball; her father suggested that she play the sport because of her height.

Jones attended Chapman University on a basketball scholarship. Initially unsure of what she wanted to study, Jones worked as a disc jockey at the student radio station, KNAB, and contemplated playing professional basketball overseas. When her coach, Brian Berger, left Chapman in 1986 for the head-coaching job at Colorado State University, Jones followed. Once at Colorado State, Jones contemplated pursuing a pre-law degree, but changed her major several times, including to accounting and computer science, before settling on communications. She left Colorado without a degree.

== Career ==
=== Stand-up ===
Jones began doing stand-up comedy in college in 1987, when a friend signed her up for a "Funniest Person on Campus" contest. After winning the contest, Jones left school for Los Angeles. She performed at comedy clubs while working day jobs at Roscoe's House of Chicken and Waffles and UPS to make ends meet. Comedians Mother Love and Dave Chappelle encouraged her to move to New York City to hone her craft. She lived there for over two years, during which she appeared on BET's ComicView, before returning to Los Angeles. She performed at The Comedy Store in West Hollywood, but her shows there received unfavorable reviews. She then went on tour, opening for Jamie Foxx where she was booed by his audience. Foxx advised her to "live life for a little while" to gain experiences for her comedy; Jones stopped performing for three years. She then performed in smaller clubs until 2010, when she began asking for spots at The Comedy Store and secured prime-time slots for her act. In 2012, Chris Rock saw her perform and gave her name to several of "the biggest managers in comedy" all of whom "didn't get it". The following year, Rock helped Jones secure an audition for Saturday Night Live, which she landed.

In 2008, Jones was part of Katt Williams's It's Pimpin' Pimpin' tour.

Netflix signed Jones for a stand-up special slated for 2020.

=== Saturday Night Live ===
In December 2013, Saturday Night Live held a casting call to add at least one African American woman to the show, and Jones auditioned. Prior to being asked to audition, Jones had criticized the show, saying that the show, and especially cast member Kenan Thompson, was "not funny". Sasheer Zamata was added as a featured player, while Jones and LaKendra Tookes were hired as writers. Jones appeared during the Weekend Update segment of the May 3, 2014 episode hosted by Andrew Garfield, where her jokes about her current dating problems and her potential effectiveness as a breeding slave sparked controversy.

Jones appeared in the first and third episodes of the 40th season, hosted by Chris Pratt and Bill Hader, respectively. On October 20, 2014, Jones was promoted to the cast as a featured player, and made her official debut on the October 25, 2014 episode hosted by Jim Carrey. At age 47, Jones became the oldest person to join the show as a cast member (surpassing Michael McKean and George Coe, who were 46 when they joined the show in 1994 and 1975, respectively). Jones' addition marked the first time in SNL history that the show's cast included more than one African American woman; moreover, the 40th season was the first to have five concurrent African American cast members, beating the previous record of three. Jones subsequently returned for Seasons 41, 42 (where she was promoted to Repertory Status), 43, and 44.

In 2017 and 2018, Jones was nominated for the Primetime Emmy Award for Outstanding Supporting Actress in a Comedy Series for her work on SNL.

The 44th season was Jones's last on SNL.

=== Film ===
In 2006, Jones appeared in Master P's film Repos.

In 2014, Jones appeared in Chris Rock's directorial film, Top Five; Rock has said a follow-up is in the works, telling Complex Magazine, "Some people really shine in Top Five. You might want to see a little more Leslie Jones."

In 2015, Jones appeared in the Judd Apatow and Amy Schumer project, Trainwreck; reportedly Apatow and Schumer wrote a part specifically for Jones after seeing her turn in Top Five.

In 2016, she starred in the reboot Ghostbusters as Patty Tolan, alongside Melissa McCarthy, Kristen Wiig, and Kate McKinnon.

Jones appeared in Coming 2 America alongside Tracy Morgan, Rick Ross, and KiKi Layne. The film is a sequel to Coming to America, starring Eddie Murphy.

She has been a member of the Academy of Motion Picture Arts and Sciences in the Actors Branch since 2017.

=== Olympics coverage ===
During the 2016 Summer Olympics in Rio de Janeiro, Brazil, Jones regularly live-tweeted events and posted videos of her reactions. Enthusiasm for Jones's commentary grew, with articles appearing like The Huffington Post's "Watching Leslie Jones Watch The Olympics Is Better Than the Actual Olympics". Television producer Mike Shoemaker, one of Jones' Twitter followers, posted on Twitter that his friend Jim Bell, NBC's executive producer of the network's Olympics coverage, should add Jones to NBC's team of commentators covering the Games; Bell responded on Twitter the next day asking Jones to join NBC in Rio de Janeiro. She accepted and flew to Rio de Janeiro, covering swimming, track and field, gymnastics, and beach volleyball for NBC.

Jones reprised her duties at the 2018 Winter Olympics in South Korea, and live-tweeted again for the postponed 2020 Summer Olympics in Tokyo, Japan. She live-tweeted for the final time for the 2022 Winter Olympics in Beijing, China. She released a message on Twitter stating that this would be the last Olympics that she would live-tweet, claiming broadcaster NBC was pressuring her to stop. She also accused Snoop Dogg of not caring about the Olympics or the athletes.

=== Other work ===
Jones and fellow comedian Adam DeVine appeared in a 2016 ad campaign for Allstate Insurance, created by Leo Burnett Worldwide.

Jones hosted the BET Awards on June 25, 2017. This marked her hosting debut.

In 2018, Jones appeared in two advertisements for Amazon's Echo Spot.

In 2020, Jones hosted a Supermarket Sweep reboot. In 2021, she returned for season 2.

Jones was the host for the 2021 MTV Movie & TV Awards.

On July 24, 2026, Jones began hosting the HGTV series Roast My Rental.

== Influences ==
Jones has cited as her comedic influences: Eddie Murphy, Richard Pryor, Carol Burnett, Lucille Ball, John Ritter, and Whoopi Goldberg.

== Personal life ==
Jones is a fan of the soccer team Seattle Sounders FC. She is also an avid fan of RuPaul's Drag Race.

=== Online harassment ===
After the release of Ghostbusters in July 2016, Jones became the subject of racist and misogynistic attacks over Twitter. The social media platform responded by taking action against several users, resulting in the permanent banning of user and Breitbart editor Milo Yiannopoulos, who had described Jones as "barely literate".

After continuing to receive racist comments, Jones temporarily left Twitter on July 18, 2016. She appeared later in the week on Late Night with Seth Meyers, where she discussed the ordeal and her meeting with Twitter CEO Jack Dorsey. In response to Yiannopoulos' claim that he was targeted for being a "gay conservative", she suggested in her personal opinion that "hate speech and freedom of speech are two different things".

A month later, Jones was again subjected to online harassment. Her personal website was hacked, its contents replaced with photos of her passport and driver's license—an instance of doxxing. The site was also changed to display alleged nude pictures of her, as well as a video tribute to Harambe, the Cincinnati Zoo gorilla killed in May 2016 (a reference to the racially charged gorilla remarks hurled at Jones in the earlier attack). Her team took the website down soon after it was hacked.

Both incidents resulted in outpourings of support for Jones from fans and celebrities alike, via the hashtag #LoveForLeslieJ which trended on both Twitter and Instagram. Those who voiced support include Paul Feig, Gabourey Sidibe, Ellen DeGeneres, Sara Benincasa, Ava DuVernay, Hillary Clinton, Corey Taylor, Katy Perry, Octavia Spencer, Anna Kendrick, Lena Dunham, and Loni Love. Jones responded to the hacks on the October 22, 2016 episode of Saturday Night Live. When Jones appeared on Late Night with Seth Meyers on May 12, 2015, she was praised as an inspirational figure by a montage of fans showing support for her.

== Filmography ==
=== Film ===
Year	Film title	Role	Notes
1999	For Love of the Game	(uncredited)	
2003	National Security	Britney	
2006	Repos	Lay La	Credited as Annette Jones
2007	Gangsta Rap: The Glockumentary	Mamma Du Rag	Credited as Annette "Leslie" Jones
2008	Internet Dating	Too Sweett Jones	
2010	Something Like a Business	Vanity	
2010	Lottery Ticket	Tasha	
2010	The Company We Keep	Beverly Blue	
2012	House Arrest	Boss Lady	
2012	Christmas in Compton (aka One Bad Christmas)	Tiny	
2014	Top Five	Lisa	
2014	Kony Montana (aka Michael Blackson is Kony Montana)	Fufu	
2015	We Are Family	Leslie (The Driver)	
2015	Trainwreck	Angry Subway Patron	
2016	Ghostbusters	Patricia "Patty" Tolan	
2016	Sing	Meena's mother	Voice
2016	Masterminds	FBI Special Agent Scanlon	
2019	The Angry Birds Movie 2	Zeta	Voice
2021	Coming 2 America	Mary Junson	Winner – MTV Movie Award for Best Comedic Performance
2023	Good Burger 2	Charlotte Reed	
2024	The Sloth Lane	Dotti Pace	Voice; leading role

=== Television ===
Year	Title	Role	Notes
1996	In the House	Female Basketball Player (uncredited)	Episode: "Hoop Screams".
1997	Coach	(uncredited)	Episode: "It's A Swamp Thing".
2001–02	The Way We Do It	Various	
2004	Girlfriends	Mabel	Episode: "Love, Peace and Hair Grease". Credited as Leslie.
2007	Mind of Mencia	Nurse Brownsugar/Bodyguard	2 episodes
2007	American Body Shop	Roshanda Washington	Episode: "Fluids"
2010	Chelsea Lately	Herself (roundtable panelist)	Episode: "Crispin Glover"
2010	Problem Child: Leslie Jones (aka Big Les: Problem Child)	Herself	Showtime stand-up comedy special
2012	Daddy Knows Best	Angry Woman	Episode: "Taser"
2013	Sullivan & Son	Bobbie	Episode: "Acceptance"
2013	See Dad Run	Security Guard	Episode: "See Dad Be Normal...ish"
2013	The League	Stand Up Student	Episode: "The Bringer Show"
2014	Workaholics	Lynette	Episode: "The One Where the Guys Play Basketball and Do the Friends Title Thing"
2014–19	Saturday Night Live	Herself / Various	Cast member and writer Nominated – Primetime Emmy Award for Outstanding Original Music and Lyrics (2019); Nominated – Primetime Emmy Award for Outstanding Supporting Actress in a Comedy Series (2017, 2018); Nominated – Writers Guild of America Award for Outstanding Writing in a Comedy/Variety Series (2015)
2015	The Awesomes	Silent But Deadly	Voice, episode: "The Final Showdown"
2016	The Blacklist	Citizen	Episode: "Lady Ambrosia"
2017–19	The $100,000 Pyramid	Herself	3 episodes
2018	Kevin (Probably) Saves the World	Cindy	Episode: "The Right Thing"
2020	Supermarket Sweep	Host	
2020	RuPaul's Drag Race	Herself	Episode: "The Ball Ball"
2020	Death to 2020	Dr. Maggie Gravel	Television special
2020	Leslie Jones: Time Machine	Herself	Netflix special
2021	Celebrity Wheel of Fortune	Herself	Episode: "Leslie Jones, Chandra Wilson and Tony Hawk"
2021	2021 MTV Movie & TV Awards	Host	Television special
2021	Last Week Tonight with John Oliver	Herself	2 episodes
2022	Out of Office	Ally	Television film
2022–23	Our Flag Means Death	Spanish Jackie	Recurring role
2023	BMF	SAC Tracy Chambers	2 episodes
2023	Hit-Monkey	Eunice	Voice
2023–2024	The Daily Show	Herself	Guest host: 7 episodes (Jan. 17–19, Nov. 13–16); Guest appearance: 1 episode (Mar. 28)
2025	American Dad!	Coach (voice)	Episode: "The Mystery of the Missing Bazooka Shark Babe"
2025	Phineas and Ferb	Alliance Commander (voice)	Episode: "Meap Me in St. Louis"
2025	DMV	Sally	Episode: "The Next Window"

== Books ==
- Jones, Leslie (2023). Leslie F*cking Jones: A Memoir. Foreword: Chris Rock. New York: Grand Central Publishing. ISBN 9781538706497. OCLC 1371748489.

Preceded by David Ruprecht (1990–1995, 2000–2003)	Host of Supermarket Sweep; 2020–2022 (on hiatus)	Succeeded by incumbent
