= Directors Guild of America Award for Outstanding Directorial Achievement in Variety/Talk/News/Sports – Specials =

Annual award for television directing

- Awarded for: Outstanding Directorial Achievement in Variety/Talk/News/Sports – Specials
- Country: United States
- Presented by: Directors Guild of America
- First award: 2013
- Currently held by: Beth McCarthy-Miller for The Roast of Tom Brady (2024)

The Directors Guild of America Award for Outstanding Directorial Achievement in Variety/Talk/News/Sports – Specials is one of the annual Directors Guild of America Awards given by the Directors Guild of America. It was first awarded at the 66th Directors Guild of America Awards in 2014.

== Winners and nominees ==
=== 2010s ===
Year	Program	Winners and nominees	Network	Ref.
2013 (66th)	The 67th Annual Tony Awards	Glenn Weiss	CBS	
2013 (66th)	The 85th Annual Academy Awards	Don Mischer	ABC	
2013 (66th)	The 55th Annual Grammy Awards	Louis J. Horvitz	CBS	
2013 (66th)	2013 Rock and Roll Hall of Fame Induction Ceremony	Joel Gallen	HBO	
2013 (66th)	Louis C.K.: Oh My God	Louis C.K.	HBO	
2014 (67th)	The 68th Annual Tony Awards	Glenn Weiss	CBS	
2014 (67th)	The 86th Annual Academy Awards	Hamish Hamilton	ABC	
2014 (67th)	The 37th Annual Kennedy Center Honors	Louis J. Horvitz	CBS	
2014 (67th)	Billy Crystal: 700 Sundays	Des McAnuff	HBO	
2014 (67th)	Super Bowl XLVIII	Rich Russo	Fox	
2015 (68th)	Saturday Night Live 40th Anniversary Special	Don Roy King	NBC	
2015 (68th)	Adele Live in New York City	Beth McCarthy-Miller	NBC	
2015 (68th)	Amy Schumer: Live at the Apollo	Chris Rock	HBO	
2015 (68th)	The 87th Annual Academy Awards	Hamish Hamilton	ABC	
2015 (68th)	A Very Murray Christmas	Sofia Coppola	Netflix	
2016 (69th)	The 70th Annual Tony Awards	Glenn Weiss	CBS	
2016 (69th)	Full Frontal with Samantha Bee ("A Very Special Full Frontal Special")	Paul Myers	TBS	
2016 (69th)	The Late Late Show with James Corden ("The Late Late Show Carpool Karaoke Primetime Special")	Tim Mancinelli	CBS	
2016 (69th)	In Performance at the White House ("Smithsonian Salutes Ray Charles")	Linda Mendoza	PBS	
2016 (69th)	Tony Bennett Celebrates 90: The Best Is Yet to Come	Jerry Foley	NBC	
2017 (70th)	The 89th Annual Academy Awards	Glenn Weiss	ABC	
2017 (70th)	Amy Schumer: The Leather Special	Amy Schumer	Netflix	
2017 (70th)	Dave Chappelle: The Age of Spin	Stan Lathan	Netflix	
2017 (70th)	Full Frontal with Samantha Bee Presents Not the White House Correspondents' Dinner	Paul Pennolino	TBS	
2017 (70th)	Kennedy Center Mark Twain Prize Honoring David Letterman	Linda Mendoza	PBS	
2018 (71st)	The 60th Annual Grammy Awards	Louis J. Horvitz	CBS	
2018 (71st)	The 72nd Annual Tony Awards	Glenn Weiss	CBS	
2018 (71st)	Bill Maher: Live from Oklahoma	Beth McCarthy-Miller	HBO	
2018 (71st)	The Late Late Show Carpool Karaoke Primetime Special 2018	Tim Mancinelli and Glenn Clements	CBS	
2018 (71st)	Steve Martin and Martin Short: An Evening You Will Forget for the Rest of Your Life	Marcus Raboy	Netflix	
2019 (72nd)	Live in Front of a Studio Audience: Norman Lear's All in the Family and The Jeffersons	James Burrows and Andy Fisher	ABC	
2019 (72nd)	Aziz Ansari: Right Now	Spike Jonze	Netflix	
2019 (72nd)	The 91st Annual Academy Awards	Glenn Weiss	ABC	
2019 (72nd)	Dave Chappelle: Sticks & Stones	Stan Lathan	Netflix	
2019 (72nd)	Wanda Sykes: Not Normal	Linda Mendoza	Netflix	

=== 2020s ===
Year	Program	Winners and nominees	Network	Ref.
2020 (73rd)	A West Wing Special to Benefit When We All Vote	Thomas Schlamme	HBO Max	
2020 (73rd)	The Daily Show with Trevor Noah Presents "Remembering RBG: A Nation Ugly Cried with Desi Lydic"	Stacey Angeles	Comedy Central	
2020 (73rd)	David Byrne's American Utopia	Spike Lee	HBO	
2020 (73rd)	The Late Show with Stephen Colbert ("Stephen Colbert's Election Night 2020: Democracy's Last Stand: Building Back America Great Again Better 2020")	Jim Hoskinson	Showtime	
2020 (73rd)	What the Constitution Means to Me	Marielle Heller	Amazon	
2021 (74th)	Adele One Night Only	Paul Dugdale	CBS	
2021 (74th)	The 43rd Annual Kennedy Center Honors	Glenn Weiss	CBS	
2021 (74th)	Bo Burnham: Inside	Bo Burnham	Netflix	
2021 (74th)	Dave Chappelle: The Closer	Stan Lathan	Netflix	
2021 (74th)	The Daily Show with Trevor Noah Presents "Jordan Klepper Fingers the Pulse – Into the Magaverse"	Ian Berger	Comedy Central	
2022 (75th)	The 75th Annual Tony Awards	Glenn Weiss	CBS	
2022 (75th)	The Daily Show with Trevor Noah Presents "Jordan Klepper Fingers the Pulse – Hungary for Democracy"	Ian Berger	Comedy Central	
2022 (75th)	Mark Twain Prize 2022: Celebrating Jon Stewart	Marcus Raboy	PBS	
2022 (75th)	Norman Lear: 100 Years of Music and Laughter	James Merriman	ABC	
2022 (75th)	Super Bowl LVI Halftime Show	Hamish Hamilton	NBC	
2023 (76th)	Carol Burnett: 90 Years of Laughter + Love	Paul Miller	NBC	
2023 (76th)	The 95th Annual Academy Awards	Glenn Weiss	ABC	
2023 (76th)	Chris Rock: Selective Outrage	Joel Gallen	Netflix	
2023 (76th)	Dave Chappelle: The Dreamer	Stan Lathan	Netflix	
2023 (76th)	Wanda Sykes: I'm an Entertainer	Linda Mendoza	Netflix	
2024 (77th)	The Roast of Tom Brady	Beth McCarthy-Miller	Netflix	
2024 (77th)	The 77th Annual Tony Awards	Glenn Weiss	CBS	
2024 (77th)	The 96th Annual Academy Awards	Hamish Hamilton	ABC	
2024 (77th)	Ali Wong: Single Lady	Ali Wong	Netflix	
2024 (77th)	The Daily Show Presents A Live Election Night Special With Jon Stewart: Indecision 2024: Nothing We Can Do About It Now	David Paul Meyer	Comedy Central	

== Individuals with multiple awards ==
5 awards

- Glenn Weiss

== Individuals with multiple nominations ==
10 nominations

- Glenn Weiss

4 nominations

- Hamish Hamilton
- Stan Lathan
- Linda Mendoza

3 nominations

- Louis J. Horvitz
- Beth McCarthy-Miller

2 nominations

- Ian Berger
- Joel Gallen
- Tim Mancinelli
- Marcus Raboy

== Total awards by network ==
- CBS – 6
- ABC – 2
- NBC – 2
- HBO Max – 1
- Netflix – 1

== See also ==
- Directors Guild of America Award for Outstanding Directing – Variety Series
