= B. Pagels-Minor =

American business consultant and activist (born 1985)

- Born: 1984 or 1985 (age 41–42); Mississippi
- Education: Master's in Information Systems, Robert Morris University
- Occupations: Technology product consultant and LGBTQ rights activist

B. Pagels-Minor (born 1985) is an American technology product advisor, business consultant and LGBTQ rights activist.

== Early life and education ==
B. Pagels-Minor was born in Mississippi. They attended Duke University for college followed by Weinberg College of Arts and Sciences at Northwestern University for a major in history. Later, they earned an MBA and a master's degree in information systems from Robert Morris University.

== Career ==
B. Pagels-Minor started their career with a technology start-up in Chicago. They later worked with Apple Inc. and Sprout Social, a media management company.

B. Pagels-Minor joined Netflix in 2020 as a data product manager and also co-led the employee resource group for TGNC+ employees. While at Netflix, they were reportedly responsible for the October 2021 Netflix walkout, a labor dispute against the release of The Closer, a standup comedy special. Pagels-Minor was terminated from the job at the company in 2021 alleging leak of financial documents, which is denied by them.

As of 2022, Pagels-Minor serves on the board of Howard Brown Health, a healthcare non-profit organization and the YWCA of Metropolitan Chicago. They are also a board director at Northwestern Alumni Association.

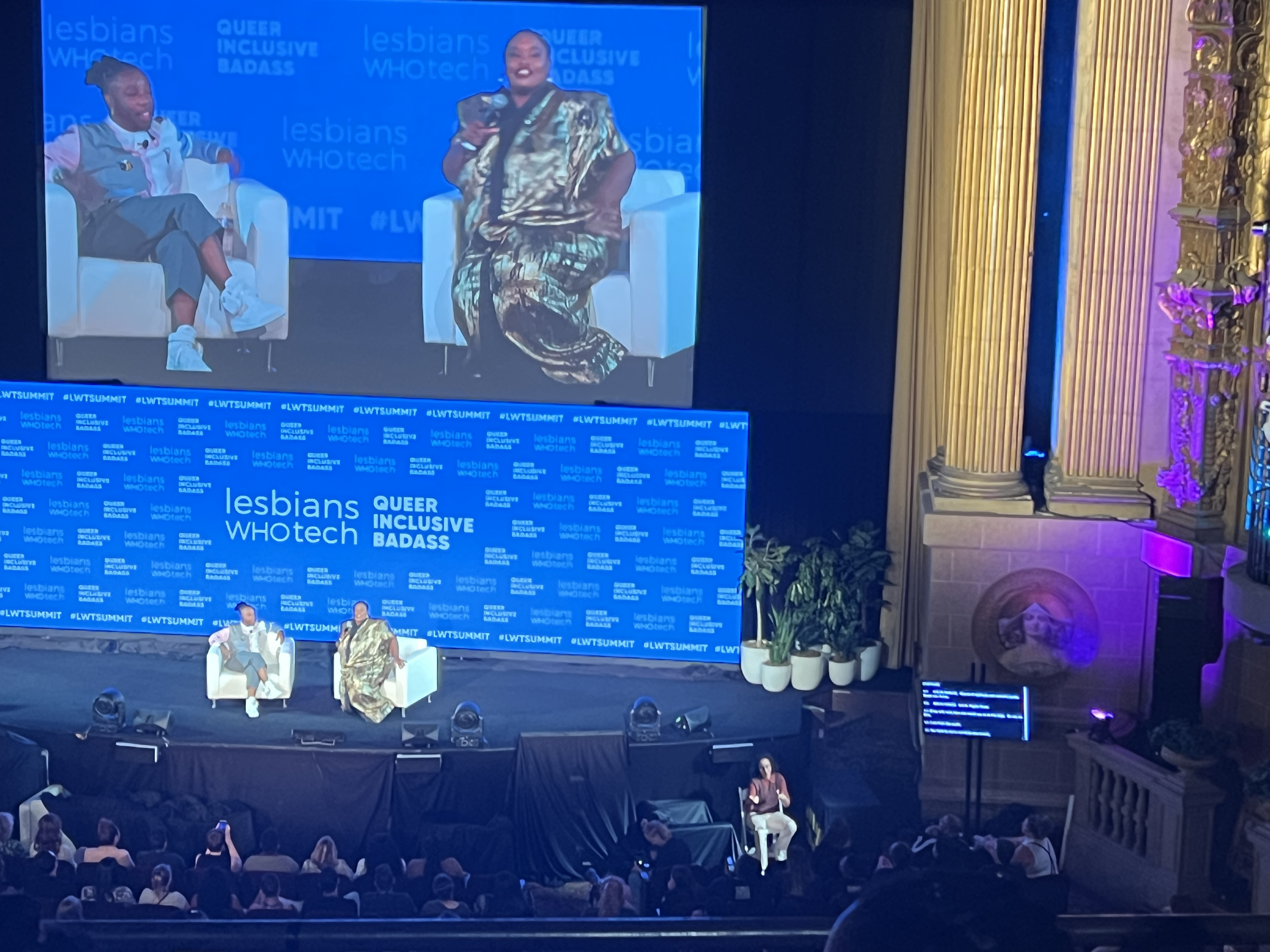
Lexi Butler and B. Pagels-Minor during a keynote session at the Lesbians Who Tech & Allies Summit, October 2023

Pagels-Minor is the first openly transgender person to own a venture capital firm, DVRGNT Ventures.

== Recognition ==
Pagels-Minor was featured in the 2022 Queer 50 list of Fast Company. They were featured in the 40 under 40 list by the Silicon Valley Business Journal in 2021. They were also recognized as one of the top 100 LGBT+ Future Leaders and one of the Top 35 Advocate Executives in 2021 and 2022 by Outstanding LGBT+ Role Model Lists and Heroes Women Role Model Lists respectively.

== Personal life ==
Pagels-Minor lives with their family in Los Angeles. They are transgender non-binary, and use they/them pronouns.
