= 2021 Netflix walkout =

The 2021 Netflix walkout was a labor dispute involving a number of workers at American streaming and production company Netflix in late 2021. After several workers spoke out against The Closer, a controversial stand-up comedy created by Dave Chappelle special released by Netflix, the company's response sparked further controversy, leading to a walkout organized by the Netflix trans employee resource group.

== Background ==
During the four-year period of 2017–2020, GLAAD's annual Studio Responsibility Index found that major studios had produced no films with transgender or nonbinary characters. In 2012, GLAAD reviewed 102 episodes and storylines of scripted television containing transgender characters, finding that "54% of those were categorized as containing negative representations at the time of their airing" while another 35% ranged from "problematic" to "good," with only 12% considered "groundbreaking, fair and accurate" to such an extent that they could win a GLAAD Media Award.

Research has found that viewing multiple transgender TV characters and stories improves viewers' attitudes toward transgender people and related policies.

== The Closer controversy ==
The Closer is a 2021 stand-up comedy special written and performed by Dave Chappelle for Netflix. In the special, released on October 5, 2021, Chappelle has segments that joke about the discrimination against the African-American community relative to the discrimination against the LGBTQ community, including one where he states that he is "Team TERF." The special sparked controversy, receiving heavy criticism for the comments perceived as transphobic and racist. GLAAD issued a statement saying that Chappelle's "brand has become synonymous with ridiculing trans people and other marginalized communities." David Johns, the executive director of the National Black Justice Coalition, released a statement asking Netflix to remove The Closer from its service, saying that "[p]erpetuating transphobia perpetuates violence."

== Labor dispute and walkout ==
On October 7, Netflix suspended Terra Field, a trans employee, after she posted a Twitter thread stating that "we launched another Chappelle special where he attacks the trans community, and the very validity of transness – all while trying to pit us against other marginalized groups" which went viral. Netflix alleged that Field, as well as two other employees, had attempted to gain access to a director-level meeting without permission. Dear White People writer Jaclyn Moore additionally announced that she would no longer collaborate with Netflix, stating the company continues to "put out and profit from blatantly and dangerously homophobic content."

On October 8, Netflix co-CEO Ted Sarandos defended the special's release in a memo sent to employees, saying that "[w]e don't allow titles on Netflix that are designed to incite hate or violence, and we don't believe The Closer crosses that line."

Following Sarandos' statement, the trans employee resource group at Netflix announced they would stage a walkout on October 20, stating in a message that the streaming company had failed them "by repeatedly releasing content that harms the Trans community and continually failing to create content that represents and uplifts Trans content." That day, Field and the two other employees who had been suspended were reinstated.

Soon after the employee resource group's threat of a walkout, Sarandos defended the special once again in a company-wide email saying "[w]ith The Closer, we understand that the concern is not about offensive-to-some content but titles which could increase real world harm (such as further marginalizing already marginalized groups, hate, violence etc.)" and that "[w]hile some employees disagree, we have a strong belief that content on screen doesn't directly translate to real-world harm". On October 15, it was reported that Netflix had fired one of the lead organizers of the walkout, a Black trans person who is pregnant, allegedly for leaking nonpublic financial information to Bloomberg News.

On October 18, the Trans Employee Resource Group within Netflix released a list of changes they wanted to see the company make, including:

- The creation of a fund to develop trans and non-binary talent
- An increase in investment in trans and non-binary content
- A review of internal procedure on commissioning potentially sensitive content
- Hiring more trans and non-binary, especially BIPOC, content executives
- Allowing employees to remove themselves out of previous advertisements the employees had participated in
- Getting rid of workplace references to transphobic content (such as posters in offices)
- An acknowledgement of Netflix's responsibility for harm its content causes
- The additional of disclaimers to content that contains discriminatory portrayals

On October 19, Sarandos stated in an interview with Variety that there was "a group of employees who were definitely feeling pain and hurt from a decision we made" and that his internal responses to the situation "should have led with a lot more humanity."

On October 20, at around 10:30 a.m., Netflix workers began walking off the job. Workers who were working from home also joined the walkout, logging out of virtual workplaces. A rally was held outside of Netflix's offices in Los Angeles, attracting only ten to thirty Netflix staff and supporters. Journalist Ashlee Marie Preston gave a speech at the rally, stating that "there is this manipulation of algorithmic science that distorts the way that we perceive ourselves and others. And I think that companies like Netflix, Facebook, and Instagram, they play into it, and they monetize on it." A small number of counter-protestors also showed up to the rally, including some who chanted anti-trans slogans.

On October 29, B. Pagels-Minor and Terra Field announced that they would be filing unfair labor practice charges against Netflix with the National Labor Relations Board, alleging that Netflix retaliated against them for attempting to improve working conditions within the company. On November 22, Field announced that she was resigning from Netflix. That same date, the lawyer for Pagels-Minor and Field stated "My clients have resolved their differences with Netflix and will be voluntarily withdrawing their NLRB charge".

== Reactions ==
A number of prominent filmmakers spoke out in support of the walkout, including Elliot Page, Lilly Wachowski, Billy Eichner, Mason Alexander Park, and Angelica Ross. Comedian Hannah Gadsby condemned Sarandos for drawing their name into the controversy, calling Netflix an "amoral algorithm cult." Writing for USA Today, filmmaker Leigh Finke criticized Netflix for portraying itself as "a neutral entity in politics and culture, they'd have us believe. They're working in a vacuum where art exists unto itself, incapable of real-world harm."

A number of commentators saw the walkout as part of a growing labor rights movement within the American tech sector. Alan Hyde of Rutgers Law School stated that the walkout was part of a trend of tech workers reclaiming more say in the activities of the company they work for, pointing to the ongoing Striketober and stating that "they want to have a say in the kinds of businesses their company does, the kind of workplace culture they have, who the clients are." Veena Dubal of the University of California, Hastings stated that "three years ago, a worker walkout at a major tech company would have been unthinkable" and that the walkout demonstrated that white-collar workers now understood "their ability to change the unethical practices of their employer by withholding their labor".
