= The Closer (2021 film) =

Stand-up comedy special by Dave Chappelle

- Promotional poster for the special
- Directed by: Stan Lathan
- Written by: Dave Chappelle
- Produced by: Sina Sadighi
- Starring: Dave Chappelle
- Edited by: Jeff U'ren
- Production company: Netflix Worldwide Entertainment
- Distributed by: Netflix
- Release date: October 5, 2021
- Running time: 72 minutes
- Country: United States

The Closer is a 2021 American stand-up comedy special written and performed by Dave Chappelle for Netflix. It was directed by Stan Lathan and recorded over the course of seven sold-out performances at The Fillmore Detroit, which ran from August 10 to 15, 2021. The Closer is Chappelle's sixth and final special under his 2016 deal with Netflix, with the other five being Deep in the Heart of Texas, The Age of Spin, Equanimity, The Bird Revelation and Sticks & Stones.

The special contains segments that joke about the discrimination against the African-American community relative to the discrimination against the LGBTQ community. The special received a mixed reception from critics while some LGBTQ groups called for the special's removal from the service and some Netflix employees criticized and protested Chappelle's jokes about the transgender community. Netflix CEO Ted Sarandos repeatedly defended the special as freedom of artistic expression.

The special received various award nominations including for two Primetime Emmy Award nominations for Outstanding Variety Special and Directing for a Variety Special.

== Synopsis ==
Chappelle jokes about the COVID-19 pandemic in the United States, mentioning that he took the Johnson & Johnson COVID-19 vaccine and jokes that it was due to its relatively lower efficacy rate. He talks about having contracted COVID-19 and being asymptomatic, comparing himself to Magic Johnson's HIV infection. Chappelle laments that while in quarantine he was concerned about anti-Asian hate, particularly Black on Asian violence.

Chappelle shares his idea for a movie plot, about aliens claiming the earth. These aliens were an ancient civilization who once inhabited the earth and then explored space, but after a long period things went badly for them and they decided to go back and claim the earth. He calls them "space Jews".

Chappelle jokes that he has written a series of children's books, similar to Clifford the Big Red Dog, except it is about a Black man who is shot by police in each installment. He calls the book Clifford, the Big Black Nigger.

Chappelle jokes about controversy concerning DaBaby, and wonders aloud why the rapper was "canceled" for making disparaging remarks about the LGBTQ community but not for killing a man in a Huntersville, North Carolina Walmart. Chappelle says that someone being gay does not mean they cannot be racist.

Chappelle wonders if someone like Mike Pence is gay himself. He also mentions that older gay men are different than the new generation of LGBTQ people, as the older generation had experienced adversity like Stonewall. Chappelle jokes that he likes the concept of a glory hole, and that it takes a lot of courage to use one. He jokes about Martin Luther King utilizing the glory hole as a method for racial unity.

Chappelle then tells a story about getting into an altercation with a gay man who was videotaping Chappelle at a bar in Austin, Texas. The man called the police on Chappelle, and retorts that "Gay people are minorities, until they need to be White again." Chappelle also relates a story of being in an altercation with a lesbian woman in a separate incident.

Chappelle talks about his narrative with the transgender community, and voices his opposition to bills aimed at regulating trans bathroom use.

Chappelle celebrates the adoption of the Juneteenth holiday.

Chappelle tells a story of meeting a transgender woman's mother and later the woman herself at two separate bars in Ohio.

Chappelle discusses the MeToo movement, suggesting hypocrisy amongst celebrities. He also explores the dictionary definition of feminism and by definition defines himself as a feminist. He mentions that J. K. Rowling is considered a "TERF" (trans-exclusionary radical feminist) and says that, since he is a newly appointed feminist, joked that he is "Team TERF". Chappelle jokes about Caitlyn Jenner winning "Woman of the Year" in her first year as a woman. He proceeds to address the audience saying, of Jenner, that she “beat every Bitch in Detroit; she’s better than all of you.” After receiving laughter from the audience, Chappelle continued, saying, “Oh, I’d be mad as shit if I was a woman. I’d be mad if I was me.” He compares it to Eminem winning an award at the BET Awards for "Nigger of the Year".

Chappelle then talks about Twitter, declaring it "not a real place", before finishing with a story about Daphne Dorman, a transgender comedian he had a role in mentoring. Dorman died by suicide after opening for Chappelle during his Sticks & Stones tour; Chappelle alleges she experienced online harassment from people in the trans community for defending Chappelle's comedy.

== Production ==
In 2016, Chappelle made a deal to release three stand-up comedy specials on Netflix. The deal was extended to include more specials and The Closer marks the sixth and final show in the series. The other shows were Deep in the Heart of Texas, The Age of Spin, Equanimity, The Bird Revelation, and Sticks & Stones. The Closer was written and performed by Chappelle. It was produced and directed by Stan Lathan who directed Chappelle's previous specials. The special was recorded over the course of seven sold-out performances at the Fillmore in Detroit, which ran from August 10 through August 15, 2021. Originally, the show was to run from August 10 to 12, but three additional dates were added "due to overwhelming demand". In the trailer for the show Chappelle stated, "Comedians have a responsibility to speak recklessly. Sometimes the funniest thing to say is mean. Remember, I'm not saying it to be mean: I'm saying it because it's funny."

The show was dedicated to the memory of comedian Norm Macdonald, who died shortly before its release.

According to leaked documents obtained by Bloomberg News, Netflix paid $24.1 million for The Closer.

== Music ==
The opening titles feature the song "Tribute" by Black Star. The closing credits feature "I Will Survive" by Gloria Gaynor.

== Release ==
The special was released on October 5, 2021, on Netflix. The Closer ranked in seventh place for original content in streaming audience measurements from Nielsen ratings for the week of October 4–10, 2021.

== Reception ==
=== Critical reception ===
The special received mixed reviews from critics. On Rotten Tomatoes The Closer has an approval rating of 40% based on reviews from 10 critics, and an average rating of 6.20 out of 10. The Closer had a 96% positive audience score on Rotten Tomatoes. Some reviewers pointed out the discrepancy with poor ratings from professional critics.

Eric Deggans of NPR in a negative review thinks Chappelle goes too far, that his jokes treat oppression like a zero-sum game, and that "untangling homophobia, transphobia, racism and white privilege requires a lot more effort and understanding than Chappelle makes here."

Dan Di Placido of Forbes in a negative review wrote that The Closer painted the picture of a declining comedian, saying that Chappelle seems intent on defining himself using the controversy surrounding "Chappelle's habit of mocking the trans community, in a way that the community largely objects to." Di Placido stated that Chappelle's story about Daphne Dorman in the special felt out of place, and called the special "an hour of Chappelle insisting that he is right, and his critics are wrong."

Craig Jenkins of Vulture gave it a mixed review, and wrote: "This time, [Chappelle]’s going for the predictable jabs and rehashing takes that were old hat five years ago … He needs new ideas.."

Helen Lewis of The Atlantic in a mixed review wrote that "The emotion that defines The Closer is not laughter, but anger. Chappelle once delivered his most offensive jokes with a goofy, quizzical, little-lost-boy smile, removing some of their sting, but here the humor feels sour and curdled. The stoner who never gave a shit seems genuinely frustrated and goaded on by social-media pile-ons. An alternative title for the special might be A Response to My Critics." She compared Chappelle's special to a Rorschach test, describing his jokes are both funny and offensive, and that he is "entirely right to indict would-be censors for their wild inconsistencies and their capricious attitude to offense."

Jim Schembri in a positive review wrote "Chappelle presents himself as an unfiltered, unflinching free thinker, fully aware of the controversy he creates and totally unapologetic about it."

=== Jokes about the transgender community ===
Chappelle's jokes about the transgender community were criticized by GLAAD, which said in a statement that "Chappelle's brand has become synonymous with ridiculing trans people." David Johns, the executive director of the National Black Justice Coalition, published a statement saying "[p]erpetuating transphobia perpetuates violence" and asked Netflix to remove The Closer from its service.

Reactions to the special by the public were mixed. The Los Angeles Times interviewed three LGBTQ comedians, asking for their opinion on The Closer. Some were in support of Chappelle's artistic freedom as a comedian while others were hurt by the content of the special. CNN interviewed transgender comedians about the special and received mixed responses; Black trans comedian Flame Monroe was supportive of Chappelle's special, while Black trans comedian Dahlia Belle criticized it. Denne Michele Norris, editor-in-chief of Electric Literature, was infuriated by The Closer and felt that its jokes erased the experiences of Black queer people. Norris, who is a Black trans woman, responded by creating an anthology written by queer people of color: Both/And: Essays by Trans and Gender-Nonconforming Writers of Color.

Some Netflix employees responded negatively to the special. On October 8, 2021, Netflix co-CEO Ted Sarandos defended the special's release in a memo sent to employees saying that "[w]e don't allow titles on Netflix that are designed to incite hate or violence, and we don't believe The Closer crosses that line." Following Sarandos' statement, the trans employee resource group at Netflix announced they would be staging a walkout on October 20. After the announcement of the walkout, Sarandos defended the special once again in a company-wide email saying "[w]ith The Closer, we understand that the concern is not about offensive-to-some content but titles which could increase real world harm (such as further marginalizing already marginalized groups, hate, violence etc.)" and that "[w]hile some employees disagree, we have a strong belief that content on screen doesn't directly translate to real-world harm".

On October 7, at a private screening of his documentary Dave Chappelle: Live in Real Life, Chappelle responded to the controversy saying: "If this is what being canceled is, I love it." At another screening of his documentary, on October 17, Chappelle told the audience "Don't worry about me... I've got enough money to never work again in my life." He also mentioned following the backlash from his special, two screenings of the documentary were cancelled.

On October 19, Sarandos defended the special again as "freedom of speech and creative expression". Before the planned walkout, Netflix issued a company statement encouraging employees to attend the protest without repercussions. On October 20, there was a small employee walkout of between twelve and thirty employees at a Netflix building in Los Angeles.

On October 21, a representative for Chappelle reached out to TMZ saying: "Dave stands by his art: No more jokes about transgenders until we can all laugh together. The streets are talking and Dave is listening. At some point, when everyone is open, I'm sure the communities will come together" and added that Chappelle is open to a conversation with transgender activists if an invitation is extended to him. On October 25, Chappelle released a clip from his stand-up tour where he stated "Do not blame the LGBTQ community for any of this. It's about corporate interests, and what I can say, and what I cannot say."

=== Daphne Dorman ===
In the special, Chappelle discussed his friendship with Daphne Dorman, who was an American transgender comedian, actress, and software engineer based in San Francisco. Chappelle mentioned her in his earlier special Sticks & Stones. She defended Chappelle after the backlash to the special.

Dorman committed suicide in October 2019, and she was survived by her daughter. Dorman's family defended The Closer. Her sister said of Chappelle: "Dave loved my sister and is an LGBTQ ally." Chappelle has set up a college fund for Dorman's daughter.

=== Data leak ===
Bloomberg News reported that Chappelle's content "prompted leaks unprecedented in the company's history" by employees and insiders. Netflix does not share metrics associated with numbers of viewers or profitability of individual content. Three employees were suspended for attending a quarterly business report meeting uninvited which was restricted to director-level employees.

On October 15, Netflix fired employee B. Pagels-Minor for leaking nonpublic financial information to Bloomberg News. The same employee was reportedly responsible for organizing the planned October 20 walkout. A Netflix spokesperson said of the termination: "We understand the employee may have been motivated by disappointment and hurt with Netflix, but maintaining a culture of trust and transparency is core to our company". The information was said to be confidential and commercially sensitive. Pagels-Minor denied that they leaked sensitive information to the press, however Netflix stated that access records indicated "he was the only employee to access detailed, sensitive data on four titles that later appeared in the press." Pagels-Minor and Terra Field filed a complaint with the National Labor Relations Board. The complaint was later dropped after both parties "resolved their differences" but details were not provided.

== Accolades ==
Year	Award	Category	Nominee	Result	Ref.
2022	Black Reel Awards for Television	Outstanding Variety, Talk or Sketch – Series or Special	Dave Chappelle: The Closer	Nominated	
2022	Directors Guild of America Awards	Outstanding Directorial Achievement in Variety/Talk – Special	Stan Lathan	Nominated	
2022	NAACP Image Awards	Outstanding Variety Show (Series or Special)	Dave Chappelle: The Closer	Nominated	
2022	Primetime Emmy Awards	Outstanding Variety Special (Pre-Recorded)	Dave Chappelle, Rikki Hughes, Stan Lathan, and Sina Sadighi	Nominated	
2022	Primetime Emmy Awards	Outstanding Directing for a Variety Special	Stan Lathan	Nominated	
2022	Producers Guild of America Awards	Outstanding Producer of Live Entertainment, Variety, Sketch, Standup & Talk Television	Dave Chappelle: The Closer	Nominated	
2023	Grammy Awards	Best Comedy Album	The Closer	Won	
