= About Last Night (game show) =

American television game show

- Genre: Game show; Reality
- Created by: Ayesha Curry; Steph Curry
- Inspired by: Tattletales by Ira Skutch
- Presented by: Ayesha Curry; Steph Curry
- Country of origin: United States
- Original language: English
- No. of seasons: 1
- No. of episodes: 8

Production
- Executive producers: Darren Belitsky; Rikki Hughes; Steph Curry; Ayesha Curry; Tiffany Nicholson-Horton; Erick Peyton
- Producers: Jill Kushner; Lauren Wilkins; Jenelle Lindsay; Louis Brown; Eliza Baynev; Karsyn Jarrett
- Cinematography: Sebastian Jungwirth
- Editor: Austin Scott
- Running time: 22 minutes
- Production companies: Fremantle; Sweet July Productions

Original release
- Network: HBO Max
- Release: February 10, 2022

About Last Night is an American television game show hosted by Stephen and Ayesha Curry that premiered on HBO Max on February 10, 2022. This was in fact a remake of the classic '70s and '80s game show Tattletales which in turn was a remake of the '60s game show He Said, She Said.

Inspired by the '70s and '80s game show Tattletales which in turn was a remake of the '60s game show He Said, She Said, the series features celebrity couples answering embarrassing, raunchy, or otherwise humorous questions about their partners and their relationships to determine which couple knows each other best. Each couple plays to win $20,000 for a charity of their choosing. After the main rounds, the winning couple faces off against the Currys in a fast-paced final challenge. If the competing couple wins, an extra $5,000 goes to their charity (for a total of $25,000); if they lose to the hosts, every competing couple receives money for their chosen charities.

About Last Night was among the thirty-six titles cancelled and/or removed from HBO Max as part of cost-saving measures related to its merger with Discovery+ and overall restructuring process.
