= Why We Laugh: Black Comedians on Black Comedy =

- Directed by: Robert Townsend
- Written by: John Long, Quincy Newell
- Produced by: Jeff Clanagan, Richard Foos, Robert Townsend, Lydia Nicole
- Edited by: Augusta Einarsdottir, Skip Robinson
- Distributed by: Codeblack Entertainment, Sony Music Entertainment
- Release date: January 2009
- Running time: 82 minutes
- Countries: United States; Japan

Why We Laugh: Black Comedians on Black Comedy is a 2009 documentary film based on the book Black Comedians on Black Comedy: How African-Americans Taught Us to Laugh, by Darryl J. Littleton.

== Plot ==
The film analyzes the history of comedy and how the television and film industries have stereotyped African Americans throughout a multitude of generations. Quincy Newell, Executive Vice-President of Codeblack Entertainment, was the producer and co-writer with John Long on the project. The documentary was a selection of the 2009 Sundance Film Festival, and eventually acquired by Showtime. Newell himself has stated "the intent of the film is to spark meaningful discourse."

== Cast ==
The film features commentary from black comedians including:

- Chris Rock
- Eddie Murphy
- Dave Chappelle
- Steve Harvey
- Katt Williams
- Marlon Wayans
- Sherri Shepherd
- Niecy Nash
- Marla Gibbs
- Dick Gregory
