= Dave Chappelle: Killin' Them Softly =

2000 American stand-up comedy television film

- DVD cover
- Genre: Stand-up comedy
- Written by: Dave Chappelle
- Directed by: Stan Lathan
- Starring: Dave Chappelle
- Country of origin: United States
- Original language: English

Production
- Executive producers: Dave Chappelle; Howard Klein; Stan Lathan; Michael Rotenberg
- Producer: Kimber Rickabaugh
- Editor: Jeff U'ren
- Running time: 57 minutes

Original release
- Network: HBO
- Release: July 26, 2000

Dave Chappelle: Killin' Them Softly is a 2000 American stand-up comedy television film directed by Stan Lathan and written by and starring comedian Dave Chappelle. Filmed at the Lincoln Theatre in Washington, D.C., it was Chappelle's first hour-long HBO special, premiering on HBO on July 26, 2000. In the special, Chappelle talks about a variety of topics, including racism, police brutality, and drug use.

== Reception ==
Shortly after the special's release, Steve Johnson of the Chicago Tribune gave it a positive review, writing that it "[covers] the predictable black people versus white people and men versus women territory, but doing it with fresh observations and, more important, a sophisticated structure", and noting: "somebody give this guy a TV series".

In 2015, Dave Chappelle: Killin' Them Softly was ranked #6 on a Rolling Stone list of the 25 best stand-up specials and films, with writer Matthew Love stating that the special "delivers everything we know now as the comedian's trademarks: shaggy-dog tales with increasingly absurd details and quick reversals; loose-limbed and playful bits that even inspired the comedian to giggle fits; blistering commentary on race couched in seemingly offhanded storytelling. Weed-dealing three-year-olds and Sesame Street pimps aside, the comic's routines about police brutality are even more painfully prescient today than they were in 2000."

== Home media ==
Dave Chappelle: Killin' Them Softly was released on DVD in 2003.
