= VOMO: Vote or Miss Out =

- Created by: ATTN: When We All Vote
- Written by: Jordan Carlos
- Presented by: Kevin Hart
- Original language: English

Production
- Executive producers: Tom Werner; Rikki Hughes; Jarrett Moreno; Matthew Segal; Taye Shuayb; Jessie Surovell; Mike Vainisi
- Production location: Virtual
- Running time: 44 minutes
- Production companies: ATTN: Done and Dusted; Sara + Tom; When We All Vote

Original release
- Network: ABC
- Release: September 14, 2020

VOMO: Vote or Miss Out was a comedy television special organized by ATTN: and When We All Vote, an organization created by former First Lady of the United States Michelle Obama, aimed to encourage electoral participation in the 2020 United States presidential election. Hosted by Kevin Hart, the special aired on ABC on September 14, 2020 and featured comedy and musical performances, as well as appearances by celebrities and political figureheads.

== Appearances ==
- Michelle Obama (Former First Lady of the United States)
- Arnold Schwarzenegger (Former Governor of California)
- Will Ferrell
- Jon Hamm
- Larry David
- Susie Essman
- Dave Chappelle
- Chris Rock
- Wanda Sykes
- Amy Schumer
- Tiffany Haddish
- Tim Allen
- Liza Koshy
- 2 Chainz
- Lil Baby
- Charlamagne tha God
- Cristela Alonzo
- Whitney Cummings
- Scarlett Johansson
- Jay Leno
- Jaden Smith
- Willow Smith
- Kaia Gerber
- Larry Hogan (Governor of Maryland)
- Ann Romney (Wife of 2012 Republican presidential candidate Mitt Romney)
- Cindy McCain (Widow of 2008 Republican presidential candidate John McCain)

== Performers ==
- Migos - "Bad and Boujee" and "Need It"
