= Katt Williams: American Hustle =

- Poster
- Directed by: Brit McAdams
- Written by: Brit McAdams; Katt Williams; Nyima Funk
- Produced by: Gary Binkow; Michael Green; Sam Maydew
- Starring: Katt Williams; Jeremy Piven; Luenell; Tamala Jones; Da Brat; Snoop Dogg; Ludacris; Taran Killam
- Cinematography: Rhet W. Bear
- Edited by: Tim Ryder
- Music by: Mark Sunderland; Loudon Wainwright III; Joe Henry
- Production companies: Enliven Entertainment; Salient Media
- Distributed by: Vivendi Entertainment; Salient Media
- Release date: October 26, 2007 (USA limited)
- Running time: 89 minutes
- Country: United States
- Language: English
- Budget: $3,500,000

Katt Williams: American Hustle, also known as American Hustle: The Movie, is a 2007 comedy film directed by Brit McAdams, and written by Brit McAdams and Katt Williams. The film, a follow-up to Katt Williams: The Pimp Chronicles Pt. I (2006), shown on HBO, was rated "R" for its sexual content and innuendo, portrayals of drug use and related references, and general profanity.

== Synopsis ==
Katt Williams decides that he wants to make it big in Hollywood, and meets with a pair of producers who attempt to woo him with pitches for films featuring stereotypical storylines and roles used by other African-American comedians, such as wearing a "fat suit", portraying multiple characters, or starring in comedic parodies of other popular movies. Dissatisfied with the offer, Williams decides to hit the road with a group of friends, notably, comedians Red Grant, Melanie Comarcho and Luenell, willing to perform every chance they get.

The first half of the movie features (scripted) stand-up by Williams' companions, as they drive from one major city to another, performing comedy skits at any venue or event that will "hire" them—including one memorable performance from Luenell at a senior home. The journey ends in Chicago, where Williams takes over the rest of the movie with his open, underground-style stand-up comedy. After his set, the film ends with a musical performance by Williams, Da Brat and Snoop Dogg. Other cameos in the film include Jeremy Piven, Ludacris and Tamala Jones.

== Cast ==
- Katt Williams as himself
- Jeremy Piven as himself
- Tamala Jones as herself
- Da Brat as herself
- Snoop Dogg as himself
- Taran Killam as Executive
- Luenell as herself
- Red Grant as himself
- Christopher Alexander as Agent
- Mikey Day as Power Agent
- Alphonso McAuley as Penguin
- Damaine Radcliff as Jamal
- Heather Vandeven as Topless gardener
- Shannon Kane
- Melanie Comarcho as herself

== Critical response ==
The Los Angeles Sentinel gave the film a positive review, praising Williams for being "defiantly politically-incorrect."

DVD Verdict wrote positively about Katt Williams as a performance artist, offering that he is "cocky, confident, and outrageous" with a comedy delivery that is "breathless machine gun, rapid fire and manic. He's a marvel of timing and nuance." In their DVD review of this film, they wrote that the "DVD itself is no great shakes". Offering that while as a performance video it was okay visually, its audio was problematic. They also made note that the plot was "just a silly, extended skit that adds nothing. The "road trip" aspect is fun and a good excuse to see Luenell, Melanie, and Red do some bits, but all this is really just a way to pad Williams' 50-minute set for a feature-length running time." They concluded that not everyone would like the DVD, feeling it "raw and crude and offensive", but also "weirdly insightful and frequently hilarious."

DVD Talk wrote that it was "difficult to describe Williams in a way that is easily palatable to the mainstream public, without being offensive," and offered that the film started off "a bit awkwardly", giving a result which is "a mildly amusing sequence that recalls Hollywood Shuffle but doesn't really go anywhere." In making comparisons to other black comics and their films, and to Katt Williams' own more successful Pimp Chronicles 1, they wrote Williams' fans would definitely want to watch the film, and expanded that as long as other viewers understand and accept that Williams is a "foul-mouthed motherf**ker", they should enjoy the film as well.

The reviewer at CraveOnline had a positive response to the film, writing that he laughed so hard he had "pains in his sides from all its hilarity." It was offered that the film's slow start made him wonder if it would be successful, but his review concluded the film was indeed so.

== Releases ==
The film was first released by Salient Media as Katt Williams: American Hustle in 2007 with subsequent DVD release in 2009 as Katt Williams: American Hustle – The Movie, and was also included in the 4-DVD compilation Katt Williams: The Katt Pack. Throughout 2007 and 2008, the film also had limited theatrical release across the United States.

=== DVD extras ===
DVD extras include a "blooper reel" of which David Walker of DVD Talk wrote that they seem "more like extended scenes, alternate takes or outtakes than what I would consider a blooper." Also included were extended versions of the film's segments 3 and Brokeback Penguins. The reviewer offered that the DVD extras were "nothing to be impressed with", being "throwaways worth watching once, and then left to be quickly forgotten."
