= Sticks & Stones (2019 film) =

Stand-up comedy show starring Dave Chappelle

- Promotional release poster
- Directed by: Stan Lathan
- Written by: Dave Chappelle
- Produced by: Stan Lathan; Dave Chappelle
- Starring: Dave Chappelle
- Cinematography: Jay Lafayette
- Edited by: Stan Lathan; Dave Chappelle
- Production company: Pilot Boy Productions
- Distributed by: Netflix
- Release date: August 26, 2019
- Running time: 66 minutes
- Country: United States

Sticks & Stones is a 2019 American stand-up comedy television special starring comedian Dave Chappelle and directed by Stan Lathan. It was produced by Chappelle and Lathan and distributed by Netflix, the special is detailed as "a provocative perspective on the tidal wave of celebrity scandals, the opioid crisis, and more".

It is Chappelle's fifth Netflix special, following the 2017 specials The Age of Spin, Deep in the Heart of Texas, Equanimity and The Bird Revelation. Principal photography began at the Tabernacle in Downtown Atlanta, Georgia, from June 13 to 16, 2019.

The special received mixed reviews from critics, in part due to jokes about defending Chappelle's friend and comedian Louis C.K., jokes concerning the abuse allegations against singers Michael Jackson and R. Kelly, and jokes about the LGBT community. The special earned Chappelle his third consecutive Grammy Award for Best Comedy Album as well as his third and fourth Primetime Emmy Awards, including for Outstanding Pre-Recorded Variety Special.

== Synopsis ==
Following quoting the lyrics of Prince's "1999", Chappelle mentions a series of high-profile news stories about celebrities. He contrasts Anthony Bourdain with an old friend of his who, despite living under difficult circumstances, never conceived of committing suicide.

Following this, Chappelle gives an impression of the Founding Fathers, specifically referencing their role in slavery, drafting the Constitution of the United States. After this he shifts into speaking of the segment of society which bans, blacklists and boycotts entertainers over politically incorrect jokes which deter those—including Chappelle himself—from doing comedy.

He then discourages those who have yet to watch the HBO documentary Leaving Neverland (2019), which details allegations of child sexual abuse against Michael Jackson, and doubts the accusers, pointing out that Macaulay Culkin denies witnessing or being molested by Jackson. Chappelle jokes about the sexual abuse allegations against R. Kelly, whom he described as being "different" from Jackson because Chappelle is "pretty sure he did that" and jokes that many individuals are molested and it is preferable if the person that does it is famous.

Chappelle speaks about Kevin Hart, explaining that it was Hart's "dream to host the Oscars," then discusses an "unwritten and unspoken rule of show business," which is that "you are never, ever allowed to upset the alphabet people." He expresses his dismay during a conversation with a member of Standards and Practices, while filming the Chappelle's Show, over the use of the gay-slur: "faggot". In the discussion with S&P, he points out the word "faggot" is quite forbidden, but not his use of the word "nigger".

The comedian jokes about transgender people and transracialism in which he uses a car ride analogy with LGBTQ persons interacting.

Chappelle jokes about controversies surrounding comedian Louis C.K., as well as critiquing the #MeToo movement as being too draconian to be effective at reducing real issues faced by women in the industry.

Chappelle jokes about pro and anti-abortion positions.

Chappelle then jokes that black people should legally buy guns in protest to have white legislators alter the Second Amendment out of fear. In reference to gun control, he compares the post-2010 opioid crisis to the Crack epidemic in the United States advocating for decriminalization, while highlighting addiction as an illness. Chappelle also lampoons the alleged assault against actor Jussie Smollett.

Stories from his upbringing form the closing segment to the show, as he recalls his father's words of wisdom, financial difficulties, and economic discrimination which informed him as a child, whilst correlating this with school shootings.

Epilogue

The Netflix release was followed by a secret 23-minute epilogue titled The Punchline, (Note: Allowing Sticks & Stones to run uninterrupted, a secret, unsearchable Dave Chappelle special called Epilogue: The Punchline will play automatically, with Netflix confirming the secret in a sly tweet.) wherein Chappelle invited the audience to ask him questions during his Dave Chappelle on Broadway performance at the Lunt-Fontanne Theatre in New York City. During the epilogue he told a story of a previous performance at the Punch Line San Francisco where a woman had walked out of his show during his jokes about the #MeToo movement saying "I'm sorry, I was raped", to which Chappelle retorted that "Miss [...] it is not your fault [...] that you were raped. But it's not mine either."

Chappelle mentioned that during the same performance a transgender woman named Daphne Dorman, who attended several of his sets, was laughing the hardest at his transgender jokes and Chappelle joked that the reason she could take his jokes—and that the first woman couldn't—is that "Daphne used to be a man." Afterwards, according to Chappelle, they chatted at the bar and Daphne thanked him for "[normalizing] transgenders by telling jokes about us." He recalls a story of Charlie Murphy, covers the 2020 election, the #MeToo movement, anecdotes of Barack Obama and Gavin Newsom, and the most influential comedians in his life.

== Production ==
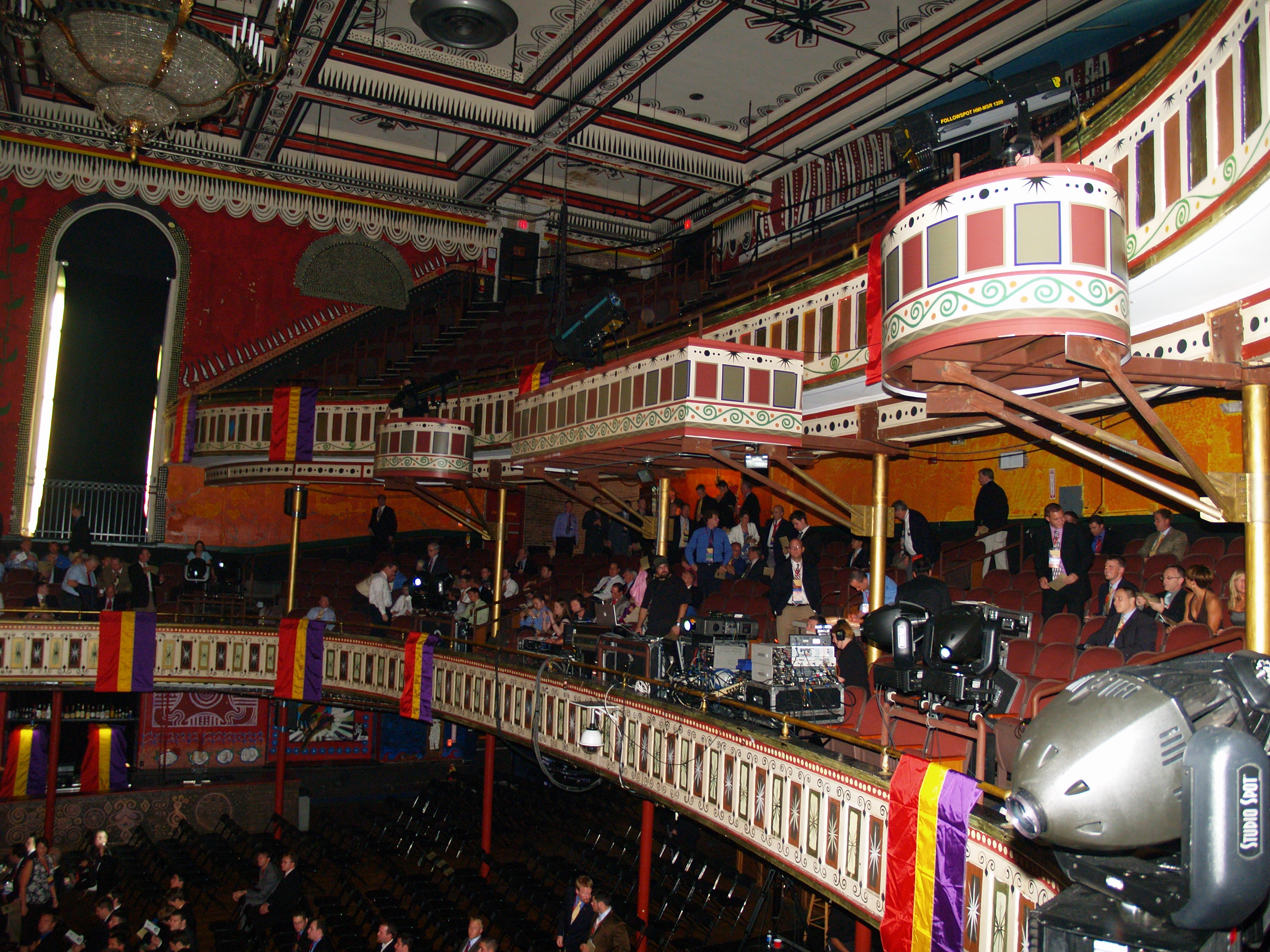
The Tabernacle in Atlanta, Georgia hosted Sticks & Stones' setting.

On November 21, 2016, The Hollywood Reporter reported that Chappelle and director Stan Lathan will produce an original stand-up comedy special exclusively for Netflix, and two never-before-seen specials hailed directly from Chappelle's personal comedy vault; with the releases being Chappelle's first concert specials in 12 years. The two additional specials were directed by Lathan, with Deep in the Heart of Texas filmed at Austin City Limits in April 2015, and The Age of Spin at the Hollywood Palladium in March 2016. Concurrently with the announcement, Lisa Nishimura, Netflix's Vice President of Original Documentary and Comedy, spoke most highly of the deal, in which she stated, "[Chappelle]'s three new specials promise to be some of the most anticipated events in comedy, and we are honored he will mark his global return on Netflix."

On November 17, 2017, Variety reported that Chappelle's third Netflix stand-up special entitled Equanimity—the first special Chappelle has produced exclusively for Netflix—will be released on Netflix on December 31, 2017. However, on December 22, it was announced by Variety that in addition to the previously announced special Equanimity, the comedian will also release the special The Bird Revelation; marking Chappelle's third and fourth Netflix specials to be released this year. Equanimity was filmed in September at the Warner Theater in Washington, D.C., while The Bird Revelation was filmed November 20 at The Comedy Store in Los Angeles.

Film director Stan Lathan spoke of having two weeks to set up the shoot for The Bird Revelation," with the director adding that it was their intent "to be as intimate and inside the experience as possible", while making references to The Age of Spin where Chappelle and he emptied the space to create a mini-stadium, complete with a thrust that takes Chappelle, who tends to walk the stage for blocks, anyway, out into the house. Lathan also mentions networks mentality when it comes to the audience in that "[they] believe audiences should be heard and not seen [...] That goes against what I personally feel is part of the TV experience. He's performing for these people, not for these cameras." For Equanimity,

Lathan photographed using 10 Sony 4300 cameras, in which he states: "three jibs, two handhelds, four peds and a Steadicam, which gave us a 360-degree look at the theatre. Instead of relying on typical audience cutaways, we included Dave in those shots whenever possible." In Spring 2018, Lathan was finishing work on one of Chappelle's specials, wherein he spoke of the editing process and bringing the comedian into the editing room, with Lathan stating that he knows to leave wiggle room so they can cut among shows, ultimately shaping the performance.

Lathan spoke of cut shifting ever so slightly based on the spontaneously of Chappelle, with the direct stating, "There's some nights [...] where the direction will shift a little bit based on a specific kind of response from an audience [...]", whilst concluding that world events in that even day may influence the final cut. The audio post-production company Levels Audio, which worked on Equanimity & the Bird Revelation, was brought back for Sticks & Stones, with audio engineers Brian Riordan and Connor Moore being tasked with re-recording mixing.

According to leaked documents obtained by Bloomberg News, Netflix paid $23.6 million for Sticks & Stones.

== Marketing and release ==
On August 15, 2019, Netflix announced Chappelle's fifth comedy special in an announcement teaser on YouTube narrated by Morgan Freeman. Rick Porter of The Hollywood Reporter stated that while the teaser doesn't reveal any of Chappelle's material, the special's title—and the voiceover narration from Freeman—may suggest that the comedian may be addressing criticism he faced after making jokes about transgender people and the #MeToo movement in Equanimity and The Bird Revelation (2017).

Editors at Maxim spoke of not getting any snippets of the actual stand-up special itself, although describing it as "a must-watch [...]." Israel Daramola of Spin wrote: "Without revealing anything, it's pretty clear that Dave isn't skirting away from any of the controversies he's seen from his latest stand-up specials." The special was released through Netflix on August 26, 2019. In conjunction with Netflix's policies, the viewing figures for the special have not been released to the public.

== Reception ==
=== Critical reception ===
Sticks & Stones received mixed reviews from critics. The review aggregation website Rotten Tomatoes reported that 35% of critics gave the show a positive review based on 17 reviews, with an average rating of 5.7/10. The website's critical consensus reads, "Edgy, but empty, Sticks and Stones might not break any bones, but it won't elicit many laughs, either." It has drawn criticism from both the left and right sides of the aisle, primarily for Chappelle making light of pedophilia and Michael Jackson's alleged victims; however, others have appreciated the special for its wide-ranging social commentary and Chappelle's unwillingness to censor himself to appease others.

Vanity Fair's Laura Bradley, in a negative review, criticized the "stale work from a comedian who was once known for truly boundary-pushing comedy", adding that "These jokes [...] fall right in line with an increasingly defiant streak among comedians who rail against P.C. culture, and insist that the public has lost its ability to understand jokes in context." A more critical review came from Kyle Smith of the National Review, who wrote: "The set mostly misses the mark. And what is that mark? The truth. Chappelle remains one of the most vital, and certainly among the most daring, of standups [...] His latest hour is a setback."

Writing for The Ringer, Alison Herman also returned with a negative review: "Sticks and Stones is designed to generate inflammatory coverage... It's a symbiotic cycle with no end in sight, and it's become the last thing a beloved provocateur should ever want to be: predictable." Garrett Martin of Paste wrote that the special "is terrible not because audiences have changed, but because Chappelle himself is so thoroughly out of touch with today."

Dani Di Placido of Forbes called it "a special which feels like Chappelle's 'old man rant,' revelling in his perceived political incorrectness." Madeline Fry of The Washington Examiner spoke of the certain failings of Sticks & Stones, albeit praising Chappelle at picking upon subtle hypocrisies in our society, to which Fry explains: "[Chappelle] does a good job of pairing arguments from the pro-abortion side with some of their logical shortcomings."

Comedian Katherine Timpf remarked that Chappelle "intended his special to be a protest against cancel culture and oversensitivity". Gerard Baker of The Wall Street Journal spoke highly of the piece, stating that "Today's performers mostly fall over each other to demonstrate new establishment bona fides. They may call themselves woke. They're barely breathing." He continued by praising the performance: "[Chappelle] is, in that sense, a true comic—one of extraordinary talent and sophistication."

D. Watkins of Salon, in a positive review, felt that "dismissing Chappelle's work as simply or obstinately regressive is not unlike seeing the world through the same lens as" a Comedy Central network executive who, according to Chappelle, told him that he couldn't say a slur against gay people despite allowing him to routinely use a slur against black people. The forthrightness of Chappelle was appreciated by reviewers such as Jeremy Jahns who commented specifically that "I couldn't help but appreciate the fact that, well, this guy will do it; he'll go there."

Kahron Spearman of The Daily Dot gave the special a positive rating, stating: "Never before has a comic combatively discussed the nuances of race in such a challenging way [...] Watching Chappelle in the present is like observing an all-timer fighter in his prime." Steve Krakauer NBCNews.com acclaimed Chappelle as "[...] a genius who leaves you just uncomfortable enough, laughing while you squirm. The problem now with Dave Chappelle is he's a birdshot sniper in a buckshot society."

Alexander Cameron of The Spectator lambasted Chappelle's critics by stating: "The idea that a comedian can only make jokes about certain groups is not a criticism, but a personal belief. It's a projection of relative morality, where those who are perceived as vulnerable must be protected at all costs from any ridicule, even the joking kind." Joshua B. Porter of The Good Men Project, rated the film 4 out of 5 stars, stating that, "Sticks and Stones might be Chappelle's tightest set, tempo wise. He jumps right in and moves along at a brisk and controlled pace. There isn't much fat and he ties up material quickly and effectively when he's ready to move along to other material."

Sean L. McCarthy of The New York Times wrote: "[...] Chappelle also has seen the opioid crisis, and he brings both guns and drugs back to race relations in America, where he not only offers funny solutions, but also finally finds one joke target for whom nobody would feel sorry." McCarthy concludes by stating that "[Chappelle] only makes jokes about people and things with which he identifies. It's a sincere moment, leading to a sincere story from his childhood."

Some reviewers characterised Sticks & Stones as showing the divide between critics and audiences. Newsweek compared the early zero percent score on Rotten Tomatoes to a more positive 8.5 out of 10 from IMDb users. CNBC contrasted the negative critical reviews to the Rotten Tomatoes audience score of 99%. Writing for Film Threat, Dante James contrasted the 99% Rotten Tomatoes audience score, with the initial Rotten Tomatoes 0% approval rating, saying: "[...] all of the negative reviews were from six (ultra-progressive) critics who had it in for Chappelle for his last couple of Netflix specials."

=== Controversy ===
Sticks & Stones garnered controversy, receiving backlash for Chappelle's jokes about abuse allegations against Michael Jackson and R. Kelly, and for his commentary on the LGBT community, including a stereotypical impression of a Chinese person which he performed during a joke about transgender people. Of the Michael Jackson allegations, Chappelle reiterated his stance to avoid watching HBO's Leaving Neverland (2019), which detailed Michael Jackson's alleged child abuse, as he remarked he doesn't believe the accusers due to Macaulay Culkin's stance in stating he wasn't molested by Jackson nor witnessed the singer assaulting anyone.

Jackson accuser Wade Robson responded to the special by stating: "Whether [Chappelle] believes I was sexually abused as a child, or not, is of no concern to me. Yet [...] to shame victims and trivialize and condone child sexual abuse in general, especially if the abuser is a celebrity or someone in a place of power, is disgusting, irresponsible and inexcusable on the part of [Chappelle], and on the part of Netflix [...]" James Safechuck, another Jackson accuser, stated that: "I'm heartbroken for all those children who look to see how they will be received when they finally find the courage to speak out about their sexual abuse."

John Branca, executor of the Michael Jackson Estate, responded to Robson's statement, saying "Wade's accusations emerged only after his book failed and we turned him down for a job with our Las Vegas show 9 years ago. He couldn't get a job until HBO and Dan Reed hired him. He'll say anything to avoid answering the question of why people like Dave Chappelle don't believe him or to address the factual holes and inconsistencies in this one sided documentary that did not interview a single person other than the two guys and their families, who are in it for the money." Leaving Neverland director Dan Reed commented on Chappelle's comments, stating that they weren't "very funny or clever". He also disputed the implication that his documentary was associated with cancel culture: "There's nothing in the film that says, 'Don't listen to Michael Jackson'. There's nothing in this film that says, 'Cancel MJ'. We're not part of cancel culture".

Surviving R. Kelly producer Dream Hampton disputed Chappelle's claim that she approached him at a performance in Detroit to ask him to appear in the documentary: "I didn't personally (or casually) invite Chappelle [...] The producer responsible for celeb outreach officially asked him, more than once. I haven't seen or talked to [Chappelle] in about 8 years [...] I wanted him to talk about the two pieces of cultural criticism he produced about R. Kelly for the Chappelle show", Hampton tweeted. Chappelle declined to appear in the documentary as he didn't know Kelly personally. Hampton also accused Chappelle of misquoting her: "I [...] have never in my life said the words 'too hot for TV'".

In response to Chappelle's material about the LGBT community, lesbian comedian Elsa Eli Waithe stated: "Sure, everything is fair game. But he uses his platform to make jokes about rape victims, trans folks, and the LGBTQ community. With all that's going on in the world, that's what he chooses to do?" Gay comedian Guy Branum posted on Twitter that "Comedians should support each other and one way Dave Chapelle [sic] could support me more is by calling me a faggot less." Conversely, transgender comedian Daphne Dorman, whom Chappelle mentioned during The Punchline, spoke highly of him in stating: "[Chappelle] doesn't consider himself better than me in any way. He isn't punching up or punching down. He's punching lines. That's his job and he's a master of his craft."

Gay comedian Alex English stated that Chappelle is "providing visibility to a group of people whom are ignored constantly, especially in the LGBTQ community." Transgender comedian Alison Grillo noted that "I guess the most offensive joke I would say, personally, was the joke about the LGBT people in the car [...] But otherwise, I didn't think it was a terribly mean-spirited performance."

Chappelle's impression of a Chinese person has been called "racist", though Chappelle mentions later in Sticks & Stones that his wife Elaine is Asian. In response to the special, Korean American comedian Joel Kim Booster stated that "[...] I think Chappelle used to have really interesting and prescient things to say about power structures [...] I just don't think he's interested in dismantling that anymore. At least not from an interesting place, or at least not from beyond his own point of view."

Comedian Norm Macdonald said "If any of you wish to be a comedian, study Sticks and Stones, a comedy special from The Peerless One. If you don't consider Chappelle funny, you are wrong. If you are a comedian who does not see that he is the best we have, quit."

=== Analysis ===
Comedian Keith Bergman argued that the material within Sticks & Stones was designed to keep viewers engaged and that "Most of the special felt calculated to generate clickbait." Todd M. Schoenberger of the institutional research firm Wellington & Co. told CNBC that Netflix was in "hypergrowth mode" and would not lose viewers overall because "Streaming services are willing to go through some viewers being offended to bring others to the table."

== Chart history ==
Chart (2019)	Peak position
US Top Comedy Albums (Billboard)	4

== Accolades ==
Year	Award	Category	Nominee(s)	Result	Ref.
2020	Directors Guild of America Awards	Outstanding Directing – Variety Specials	Stan Lathan	Nominated	
2020	Grammy Awards	Best Comedy Album	Dave Chappelle	Won	
2020	Primetime Emmy Awards	Outstanding Variety Special (Pre-Recorded)	Dave Chappelle, Stan Lathan, Rikki Hughes and Sina Sadighi	Won	
2020	Primetime Emmy Awards	Outstanding Writing for a Variety Special	Dave Chappelle	Won	
2020	Primetime Emmy Awards	Outstanding Directing for a Variety Special	Stan Lathan	Won	
2020	Primetime Emmy Awards	Outstanding Picture Editing for Variety Programming	Jeff U'Ren	Nominated	
2020	Primetime Emmy Awards	Outstanding Sound Mixing for a Variety Series or Special	Michael Abbott, Brian Riordan and Connor Moore	Nominated	
2020	Primetime Emmy Awards	Outstanding Technical Direction, Camerawork, Video Control for a Special	Jon Pretnar, Ruben Avendano, Daniel Balton, Mano Bonilla, Eli Clarke, Helene Haviland, Ed Horton, Lyn Noland, JR Reid and Ronald N. Travisano	Nominated	
2020	Producers Guild of America Awards	Outstanding Producer of Live Entertainment & Talk Television	Dave Chappelle, Stan Lathan, Rikki Hughes and Sina Sadighi	Nominated	
