= Rip the Runway =

- The 2010 Rip the Runway Logo
- Presented by: Various

Production
- Production locations: Hammerstein Ballroom, New York City, New York, USA

Original release
- Network: BET
- Release: 2005 – 2013

Rip the Runway is an annual fashion show and music show broadcast by BET, held at the Hammerstein Ballroom in New York City.

== 2005 ==
The first Rip the Runway show was hosted by Fonzworth Bentley and Eva Pigford.

== 2006 ==
The 2006 Rip the Runway show was hosted by LL Cool J and Gabrielle Union.

== 2007 ==
The 2007 Rip the Runway show was hosted by Ciara and Chris Brown.

== 2008 ==
The 2008 Rip the Runway show was hosted by Nelly and Lauren London.

Performers

- Day26
- Cheri Dennis
- Missy Elliott
- N.E.R.D.
- T-Pain
- Flo Rida
- Snoop
- Trey Songz
- Webbie

== 2009 ==
The 2009 Rip the Runway show was hosted by Derek Luke and Joy Bryant.

Performers

- T.I.
- The-Dream
- Ron Browz
- GS Boyz
- Mavado
- Yung LA
- Young Dro
- Protege
- Bobby Valentino
- Busta Rhymes
- Fabolous
- Keri Hilson

== 2010 ==
The 2010 Rip the Runway show was hosted by Nicki Minaj and Pooch Hall.

Performers

- Ludacris
- Estelle
- Trina
- Roscoe Dash
- Janelle Monáe
- B.o.B
- Bruno Mars
- Roscoe Dash
- Soulja Boy

== 2011 ==
The 2011 Rip the Runway show was hosted by Mehcad Brooks and Selita Ebanks.

=== Performer ===
- Melanie Fiona
- Keri Hilson
- Miguel
- Lloyd
- Wiz Khalifa
- Lil Wayne
- Drake

== 2012 ==
The 2012 Rip the Runway show was hosted by Selita Ebanks and Pooch Hall. (This is the second time the two host).

=== Performer ===
- B.o.B
- Meek Mill
- Diggy Simmons
- Jeremih
- Wale
- Estelle
- Lil' Kim

== 2013 ==
The 2013 Rip the Runway show was hosted by Kelly Rowland and Boris Kodjoe

Performers

- Meek Mill
- Rick Ross
- Jaden Smith
- Luke James
- Trinidad James
- Sevyn Streeter
- Omarion
- Watch the Duck
