= Northwestern Alumni Association =

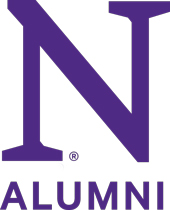
- Established: 1881
- Academic affiliations: Northwestern University
- President: Kathryn Mlsna ’74, ’77JD, ’03 P, ’12 P
- Location: Evanston and Chicago, Illinois, United States of America
- Colors: Purple

The Northwestern University Alumni Association (NAA) is an alumni association dedicated to fostering an enduring relationship between Northwestern University and its alumni and friends. The NAA also helps to foster alumni-to-alumni connections through networking and mentoring opportunities, as well as provides regional, international, and affinity clubs, educational programs, young alumni chapters, and more.

== History ==
The NAA was founded in 1881, when the newly founded Alumni Association hosted the University's first Alumni Day on June 22. The NAA made great progress in its mission to connect Northwestern alumni with their alma mater in the years that followed, overseeing the growth of alumni clubs across the nation, publishing its first alumni newsletter, and establishing many traditions still celebrated by students and alumni alike.

The NAA is governed by the NAA Board of Directors, a nationwide organization which consists of Wildcat alumni leaders who represent Northwestern alumni from every undergraduate, graduate, and professional school at the University. The current president of the NAA is Kathryn Mlsna, who serves as the principal executive officer of the Association. Mlsna also directs the duties of the other officers, chairs the executive committee, and serves as an ex-officio member of all standing committees of the Association.

The NAA also has nine standing and ad hoc committees. These committees seek to connect fellow Northwestern alumni and to contribute to the larger goals of the NAA. Standing committees focus on areas of annual giving, board membership and volunteer development, career and networking, clubs, engagement, global connection, and leadership development and education. Two ad hoc committees, the Long Range Planning Ad Hoc Committee and the Mentoring Ad Hoc Committee, also support the NAA.

The NAA's Alumni Regents are ex-officio directors of the NAA and act as ambassadors of the University for their own geographic regions. These Alumni Regents are appointed by the University president and, as such, communicate the policies and directions of Northwestern as explained by the president, represent the president at events or inaugurations in their region, and act in an advisory capacity to NU Clubs.

Today, the NAA serves an alumni base of approximately 200,000 Wildcats through a wide variety of events and programs and seeks to help Northwestern alumni strengthen their relationship with the University and fellow Wildcats.

== Traditions ==
Since the founding of the NAA, the organization has worked to strengthen and celebrate the unique bond between the University and its alumni. The NAA works to show the spirit of this unique bond in some of its oldest traditions.

=== Alumni Awards ===
The NAA, for more than eight decades, has carried on the tradition of honoring alumni who have distinguished themselves with outstanding professional and personal achievements and those who have loyally dedicated their time and service to Northwestern. These individuals are recognized for their accomplishments each year.

Awards are given to alumni for a wide variety of reasons. The Alumni Medal, the highest award granted by the NAA, “is given to an alumnus/a who combines superior professional distinction and/or exemplary volunteer service to society with an outstanding record of service to the University.” Awards also recognize loyal service rendered voluntarily to the University, alumni who have distinguished themselves in professions or fields of endeavor in ways that reflect credit on Northwestern, voluntary efforts of alumni which contribute to the improvement of society, and alumni who have made significant impacts on their professions or communities since graduation.

The NAA also presents the Grant Goodrich Achievement Award to one outstanding individual who is not a graduate of Northwestern but has enhances the University through their professional accomplishments, commitment, and service.

=== Reunions ===
Since 1884, the NAA has hosted Reunion and Homecoming Weekend for thousands of Northwestern alumni. Reunion activities include an All-Class Tailgate, a Homecoming football game, a Student and Alumni Homecoming Reception, and a Homecoming Barbeque.

=== Leadership Symposium ===
NAA has hosted an annual Leadership Symposium since 1964. This Symposium offers alumni leaders from across the country the chance to “collaborate, renew skills, build and deepen networks, and recognize the outstanding accomplishments of fellow alumni.” The Symposium typically features a mix of workshops, keynote speakers, volunteer recognition, and time to connect with fellow alumni while exploring campus.

=== Our Northwestern ===
In 2014, the NAA launched Our Northwestern, an exclusive space where Northwestern students, alumni, and faculty members can gather. Users are able to find friends and classmates through the online directory system, share memories with classmates, network with fellow users both socially and professionally, and engage in interesting discussions with peers.

== Notable alumni ==
List of Northwestern University alumni
