= It's Pimpin' Pimpin' =

It’s Pimpin’ Pimpin’

Live album by Katt Williams
- Released: January 29, 2009
- Recorded: 2008
- Venue: Washington, D.C.
- Genre: Comedy
- Label: Warner Bros. Records; 49794
- Producer: Gary Binkow (exec.); Jeff Golenberg (exec.); Katt Williams (exec.); Michael Green (exec.); Neal Marshall; Thomas Marshall

Katt Williams chronology
The Pimp Chronicles, Pt. 1 (2006)	It’s Pimpin’ Pimpin’ (2009)	Pimpadelic (2012)

Professional ratings
Review scores
Source	Rating
AllMusic	4/5 stars
Exclaim!	8/10

It's Pimpin' Pimpin' is the second comedy album by Katt Williams. It was released on January 29, 2009, via Warner Bros. Records. Production was handled by Neal Marshall and Thomas Marshall, with Gary Binkow, Jeff Golenberg, Katt Williams and Michael Green serving as executive producers. The album peaked at number 174 on the US Billboard 200, number 1 on the Comedy Albums and number 5 on the Heatseekers Albums.

== Track listing ==
All tracks are written by Katt Williams.

No.	Title	Length
1.	"Your Star Player"	8:18
2.	"Date a President"	6:45
3.	"Ritalin and Steroids"	9:43
4.	"Poor Little Tink Tink"	3:42
5.	"Laugh First"	8:50
6.	"Have Your Team Together"	4:52
7.	"Franchise Player"	6:03
8.	"Scared Of Rope"	13:31
9.	"The Vaporizer"	4:32
10.	"Finally Got My Motorcycle"	7:21
Total length:		1:13:38

== Charts ==
Chart (2009)	Peak position
US Billboard 200	174
US Top Comedy Albums (Billboard)	1
US Heatseekers Albums (Billboard)	5
