= Stan Lathan =

American film director (born 1945)

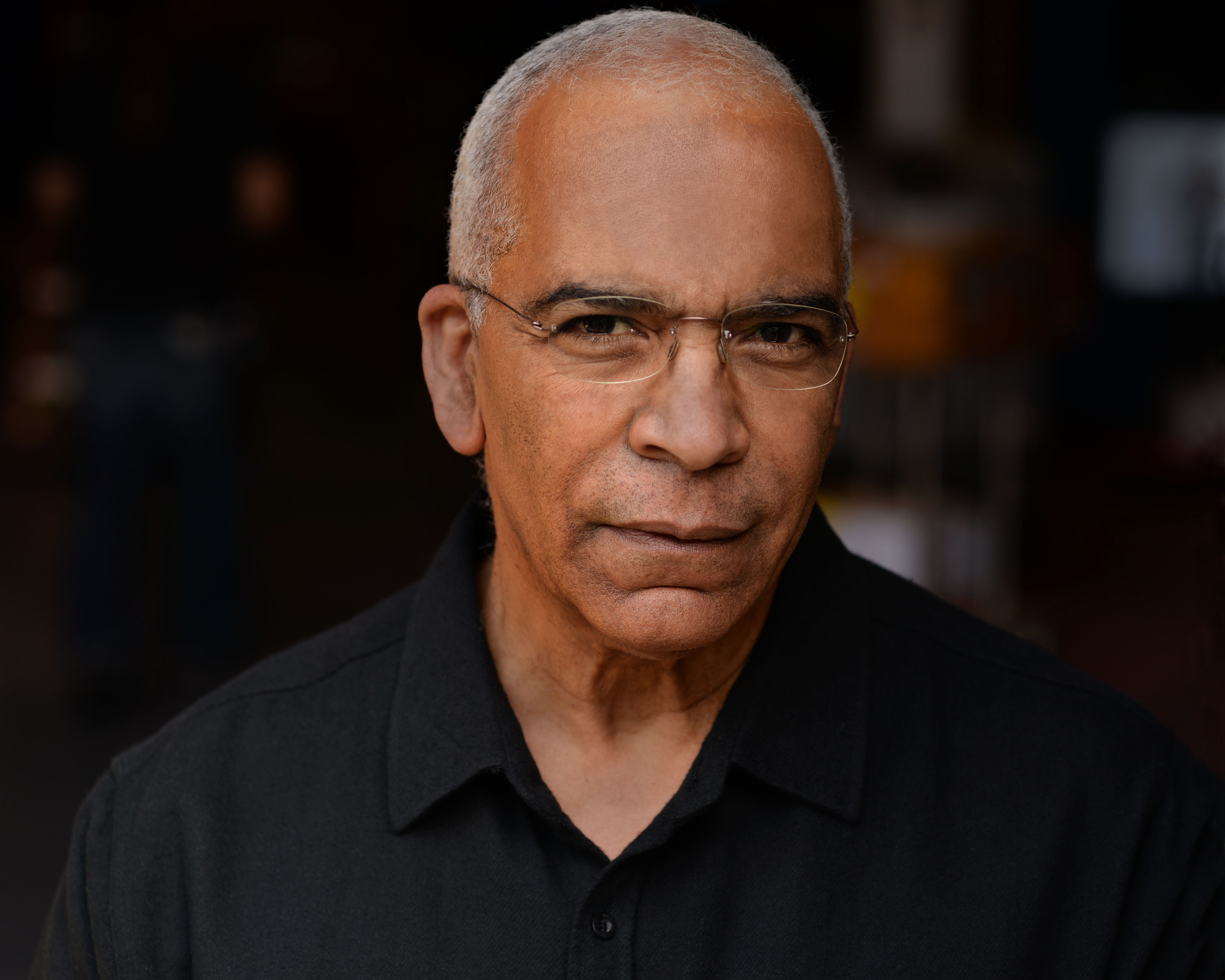
- Lathan in 2016
- Born: July 9, 1945 (age 81); Philadelphia, Pennsylvania, U.S.
- Education: Pennsylvania State University (1967)
- Occupations: Director, producer
- Years active: 1969–present
- Spouse(s): Eleanor McCoy. (m.1970–1977); Marguerite Lathan (m. 1982)
- Children: 5, including Sanaa Lathan
- Awards: Two Grammy Awards; Three Primetime Emmy Awards; Tony Award; Peabody Award; Six NAACP Image Awards

Stan Lathan (born July 8, 1945) is an American television and film director and television producer. He is executive producer and director of BET's Real Husbands of Hollywood. He has produced and directed numerous stand-up comedy specials starring comedian Dave Chappelle, including Killin' Them Softly, Equanimity, The Bird Revelation, Sticks & Stones, and The Closer.

== Early life ==
The youngest of three boys, Lathan was born and raised in Philadelphia, Pennsylvania. He is the son of Julia Elizabeth (Dunston) and Stanley Edward Lathan. His mother was a clerical employee. His brothers are William Lathan of New York, a medical doctor, and Charles Lewis, a musician living in Phoenix, Arizona.

Lathan graduated from Overbrook High School in 1963. He earned his Bachelor of Arts in theater at Pennsylvania State University in 1967 and moved to Boston to pursue a master's degree from Boston University. In response to the heightened tension surrounding the civil rights movement at that time, he was recruited by television station WGBH-TV in 1968 to help create and direct the country's first magazine show entirely produced by, for, and about African Americans-- Say Brother.

== Career ==
Lathan began directing network television in 1973, when he was brought to Los Angeles to direct multiple episodes of Sanford & Son. He went on to direct Hill Street Blues, Miami Vice, Remington Steele, Cagney & Lacey, Frank's Place, Roc and others. He also directed the 1984 feature film Beat Street for Orion Pictures.

In 1989, Lathan partnered with Russell Simmons to create the stand-up comedy franchise Def Comedy Jam on HBO. This series ran for 8 seasons and showcased many of today's popular television & movie stars. Lathan received a Peabody Award for the series Def Poetry on HBO in 2003. That same year, Lathan co-produced Def Poetry Jam on Broadway, which won a Tony Award for best special theatrical event and has toured both domestically and internationally.

Lathan has directed the pilots for many sitcoms, including Martin, Moesha, The Parkers, The Steve Harvey Show, Amen, South Central, Cedric the Entertainer Presents, All of Us, Eve, The Soul Man and Real Husbands of Hollywood.

Lathan was the executive producer and director of the stand-up comedy special Dave Chappelle: Killin' Them Softly written by and starring comedian Dave Chappelle. It was Chappelle's first hour-long HBO special, and premiered in 2000. Lathan would go on to produce and direct several more of Chappelle's specials, including For What It's Worth, which was produced in 2004 for Showtime. In 2017, Lathan produced and directed four Chappelle specials for Netflix: The Bird Revelation, Equanimity, The Age of Spin, and Deep in the Heart of Texas. He also produced and directed Chappelle's fifth Netflix special, Sticks & Stones, which was released in 2019.

He executive produced and directed Cedric the Entertainer: Taking You Higher, a one-hour comedy special for HBO, and It's Black Entertainment, a two-hour musical documentary for Showtime.

Lathan directed dramas for public television's Great Performances, American Playhouse and The American Short Story. For PBS, he directed Alvin Ailey: Memories & Visions and other dance specials featuring the Martha Graham Company, Mikhail Baryshnikov and Agnes de Mille. He directed three seasons of the popular PBS music series, SOUL!, and he was one of the first directors of Sesame Street.

In 2006, Lathan co-created Run's House, a five-season reality series for MTV that spawned a spinoff series, Daddy's Girls. He also co-executive produced Running Russell Simmons, an eight-part series for Oxygen. In 2012, he executive produced and directed The Ruckus, a stand-up series for Comedy Central.

In 2008, Lathan was the creator and executive producer of Brave New Voices, a seven-part docu-reality series for HBO. As a follow-up in 2009, Lathan staged and directed An Evening of Poetry, Music and Spoken Word, hosted by President Barack Obama and Michelle Obama in the White House.

Lathan received both the 2003 Diversity Award and the 2013 Lifetime Achievement Award from the Caucus for Producers, Writers and Directors. He has received six NAACP Image Awards for his achievements in film and television. He was honored in 2014 by the Directors Guild of America for his directing career. In 2017, he received the Trailblazer Award from the Apollo Theater in Harlem. In 2018, he was nominated for a DGA Award for his direction of the Dave Chappelle comedy special The Age of Spin and received a 2018 Grammy Award for Best Comedy Album for the same special and Dave Chappelle's Deep in the Heart of Texas.

In 2018, Lathan directed Mo Amer's Netflix stand-up comedy special The Vagabond and Amanda Seales' HBO stand-up comedy special I Be Knowin'.

Lathan executive produced and directed Dave Chappelle's Equanimity (2017) which received a Primetime Emmy for Outstanding Variety Special (Pre-Recorded).

Lathan won another Grammy Award for the 2019 Best Comedy Album for Dave Chappelle's Equanimity and The Bird Revelation.

In 2020, Latham won an Emmy in the Outstanding Directing in a Variety Special for Dave Chappelle's Sticks & Stones. As Executive Producer he also won an Emmy in the Outstanding Variety category for the same film.
