= Katt Williams =

American comedian and actor (born 1971)

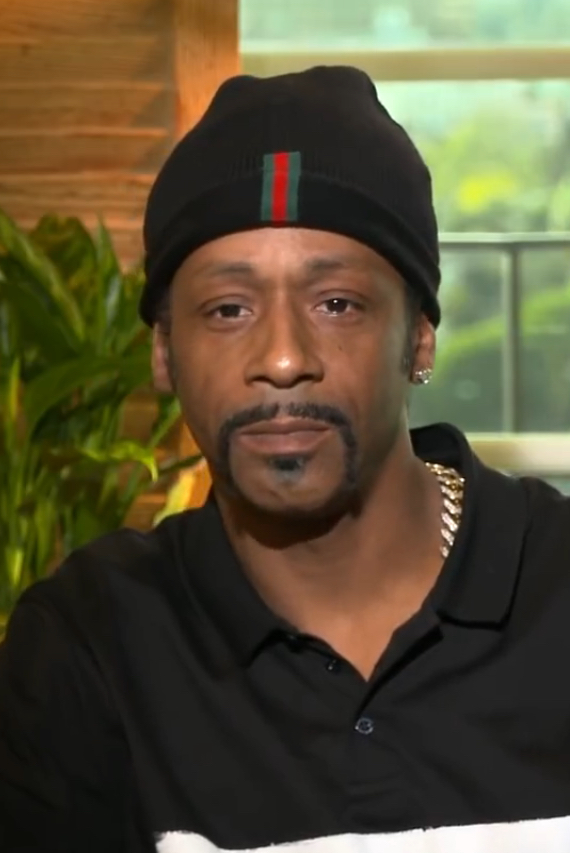
- Williams in 2018
- Born: Micah Sierra Williams; September 2, 1971 (age 55); Cincinnati, Ohio, U.S.
- Children: 10 (3 biological, 7 adopted)

Comedy career
- Years active: 1991–present
- Medium: Stand-up; television; film
- Genres: Observational comedy; black comedy; blue comedy; physical comedy; insult comedy; satire
- Subjects: African-American culture; racism; politics; celebrities; sex
- Website: kattwilliamslive.com

Micah Sierra "Katt" Williams (born September 2, 1971) is an American stand-up comedian and actor. He played Money Mike in Friday After Next, was a recurring cast member on the first four seasons of Wild 'n Out and portrayed Bobby Shaw in My Wife and Kids. Williams also provided the voice of A Pimp Named Slickback in The Boondocks and Seamus in Cats & Dogs: The Revenge of Kitty Galore, and portrayed Lord Have Mercy in Norbit.

== Early life ==
Micah Williams was born in Cincinnati, Ohio, on September 2, 1971. He was raised in Dayton, Ohio by. He stated that he learned to read at three years old, and was communicating in multiple languages, including French and Haitian Creole. During his childhood, he lived in Haiti for a year and a half on religious mission trips with his family.

Williams emancipated himself from his parents at age 13 and moved to Florida. Though homeless and living in a park, he supported himself as a street vendor. He stated that he wanted to remain God's friend.

Since at least 2016, Williams has stated on numerous occasions that he enlisted in the United States Marine Corps as a minor at the age of 16, attended boot camp, and was subsequently discharged when his age was discovered. However, in a CBS News investigation, the Marine Corps stated that there was no record of Williams having ever served in the military or attended any Marine training facilities.

== Career ==
=== Stand-up comedy ===
Williams started performing comedy in the Avondale neighborhood of Cincinnati. He honed his comic delivery by performing his routine in clubs around the country and had become an established comic by 1999, appearing at the likes of The Improv, The Comedy Club, The Ice House, and Hollywood Park Casino. Most notably, he appeared on BET's ComicView as Katt "N da Hatt" Williams.

Williams starred in his first comedy special, Let a Playa Play, in 2006. His first HBO stand-up special came in 2006 with The Pimp Chronicles, Pt. 1. In 2007, he co-wrote and starred as himself in the comedy film Katt Williams: American Hustle. The film had critical success and established Williams as a mainstream comedian. In 2008, he released his second HBO comedy special, It's Pimpin' Pimpin'. Keeping busy releasing comedy DVDs and touring, Williams had a comedy tour that was named the best of 2008 by Billboard.

After a four-year hiatus, Williams returned to stand-up in 2012 for his third HBO comedy special, Kattpacalypse. Later that year, he ended up in jail after an incident at a Seattle bar where he reportedly acted threatening and violent, then resisted arrest. The next day, Williams announced the end of his stand-up comedy career. However, three days later, he announced he would not retire.

Two live performances in November 2012 ended early because of Williams' confrontational behavior. A November 1 performance at the Wells Fargo Theatre in Denver ended after he jumped off the stage to confront a heckler. Williams' November 16 performance at the Oracle Arena in Oakland ended after he engaged in a profanity-laced confrontation with a heckler, and was assisted off stage by his own security team.

During late 2013, Williams was on his Growth Spurt Tour. On August 16, 2014, he returned with a new HBO special titled Katt Williams: Priceless: Afterlife, which was directed by Spike Lee.

In September 2015, during an interview, Williams announced and described his upcoming Conspiracy Theory Tour: "The conspiracy conversation is a conversation that we are all familiar with. We know that there are conspiracies out there, but this is a conversation that encompasses a lot of things that aren't being discussed other places. That's the basis for all conspiracy theories: the fact that there is hidden information out there, and how our process changes about things that we thought we used to know. We all, at some point, if we're are at a certain age, we grew up thinking Pluto was a planet. This is probably going to go down as one of my finest works, just because it's a collection of forbidden topics that we can't seem to get answered. I am one of the rare urban public officials. Part of my guarantee in my ticket price is that I'm going to be talking about what we are talking about now, and discussing from now to the next time we see [me] again. This is the open discussion that we've had since 2003. This is what it is about."

In 2018, Williams released a new stand-up special on Netflix called Great America and shot in Jacksonville, Florida.

In 2022, Williams released a new stand-up special on Netflix called World War III.

In January 2024, Williams was featured on retired NFL player Shannon Sharpe's podcast, Club Shay Shay. Williams' comments on the entertainment industry and other comedians including Cedric the Entertainer, Steve Harvey, and Rickey Smiley gained traction on social media.

On May 4, 2024, Katt Williams: Woke Foke streamed live from Los Angeles. Part of Netflix Is a Joke Festival, it was Williams' thirteenth stand-up comedy special (his third for Netflix).

=== Acting ===
In 2002, Williams made his acting debut on NYPD Blue on the sixth episode of its tenth season on October 29. Williams is best known for his character Money Mike in the film Friday After Next (2002), and has played supporting characters in Norbit (2007) and First Sunday (2008).

He appeared in the official music video for Nick Cannon's single "Gigolo" in 2003. He next appeared as a regular on Wild 'n Out on MTV during its first three seasons.

In 2005, Williams provided the voice of A Pimp Named Slickback while, slickback's name and overall persona are modeled after Natalac pimp of the City, a classic BET: Uncut video that went viral in the early-mid 2000s. The Boondocks. He plays himself as an on-stage stand-up comedian in Grand Theft Auto IV performing several routines, including an abbreviated version of one of his routines from Katt Williams: American Hustle. He has appeared in several episodes of My Wife and Kids as character Bobby Shaw. He was the roastmaster of the Comedy Central Roast of Flavor Flav.

In 2018, Williams played the character Willie in the season 2 premiere of Atlanta, for which he won the Primetime Emmy Award for Outstanding Guest Actor in a Comedy Series.

=== Music ===
Williams has also used the stage name "Money Mike" when rapping for songs by such artists as Baby Bash, The Game, and Suga Free. In 2006, he joined rapper Cam'ron's group The Diplomats, but was never signed as an official artist for the label. On January 29, 2009, he released his debut studio/live album, It's Pimpin' Pimpin'. On November 19, 2013, he and Hell Rell released a diss song to Atlanta rapper Trinidad James entitled "Lames in the Game" due to comments made by James about the state of current hip hop music.

== Legal issues ==
Williams has faced legal issues throughout his career, including 19 felony charges. While he has pleaded no contest and has received sentences of probation and fines, he maintains that he has no felony convictions on his record.

On November 13, 2006, Williams was arrested at Los Angeles International Airport after a gun that had been reported stolen was found in his briefcase. On December 14, he pleaded no contest to a misdemeanor count of carrying a concealed firearm and was sentenced to three years' probation, ordered to pay restitution, and given credit for the three days he spent in jail.

In November 2010, Williams was arrested by police while working on a film in Coweta County, Georgia. He was accused of stealing $3,500 worth of coins and jewelry. He was released the following day on a $40,000 bond. Police later charged him with burglary and criminal trespass.

On June 11, 2011, Williams was arrested in connection with an alleged assault on a tractor driver. The alleged victim said three women approached his tractor at around 4:30 p.m. local time and attacked him with rocks and dirt clods, causing him facial injuries. Los Angeles County Sheriff's Department officers arrived on the scene and arrested the three women for assault with a deadly weapon, and arrested Williams for felony intimidation of a witness. He was booked into jail and released that same night on $50,000 bail.

On November 15, 2012, Williams was arrested in Oakland, California, on charges of suspicion of assault with a deadly weapon; he had allegedly beaten an 18-year-old with a bottle aboard Williams' tour bus in Berkeley, California.

An attendee of Williams' shortened performance at the Oracle Arena in Oakland on November 16, 2012, filed a class action lawsuit days after the event, seeking compensation for himself and "all others who paid money for a show, but got nothing but Katt Williams' nonperformance".

On December 2, 2012, Williams was arrested in Seattle after he allegedly got into a dispute at a bar in the South Lake Union neighborhood. His arrest came after he no-showed the first night of a planned two-night performance at the Paramount Theatre. Five days later, he was arrested in Dunnigan, California, on a bench warrant arising from an incident the previous month in Sacramento, California, during which he allegedly drove a three-wheeled motorbike onto a sidewalk and refused to stop for police. The resulting chase was halted due to safety concerns, and the bench warrant was issued after Williams narrowly missed several bystanders.

On December 28, 2012, Williams was arrested in Los Angeles on child endangerment charges. He was held in lieu of $100,000 bail, and four of his adopted children were placed in protective custody. According to reports, the case fell apart and no trial was scheduled.

On January 8, 2013, Williams was arrested at his Los Angeles home after failing to appear in Sacramento to answer the November 25 motorbike charges.

On October 29, 2014, Williams and Suge Knight were arrested for the theft of a camera from a photographer in Beverly Hills on September 5. In April 2017, Williams pled no contest to the charge of robbery and was ordered to undertake a year of anger management classes as well as receiving three years' probation.

On February 29, 2016, Williams was arrested in Gainesville, Georgia, when a clerk at a swimming pool store said Williams had hit him. When police arrived, they found Williams already lying face down with his hands behind his back, waiting to be handcuffed.

On March 23, 2016, a video went viral of the 44-year-old Williams getting into a fight with a 17-year-old boy following a dispute during a soccer game in Gainesville. The authorities planned to review the incident with the DA in addition to his ongoing court cases.

On April 27, 2016, Williams was arrested and charged with battery in Atlanta, Georgia, after allegedly throwing a salt shaker at the manager of a local restaurant. The manager claimed to have been hit in the mouth with the salt shaker when Williams' group was denied preferential seating.

On July 24, 2016, Williams was arrested on suspicion of battery after an altercation with a woman at the Sportsman's Lodge, a hotel in Studio City, California.

On September 15, 2016, Williams was arrested in Fulton County, Georgia, on a charge of second-degree criminal damage to property, after having turned himself in on a warrant for failing to appear in court for the April 27 incident. This new arrest involved an allegation from February 28, 2016, stating that Williams had thrown a man's cellphone.

On October 6, 2018, Williams was arrested in Portland, Oregon, on a charge of assault in the fourth degree, after he assaulted a driver during an argument about his dog. He was additionally arrested on an outstanding warrant from Georgia.

== Personal life ==
Williams has ten children consisting of three biological and seven adopted children. Williams is a Christian and often wears a cross during his shows as a symbol of his faith, though he briefly joined the Nation of Islam while living in Oakland, California.

== Filmography ==
=== Film ===
Year	Film	Role	Notes
2002	Friday After Next	Money Mike	
2004	Choices 2	Pimp in Pink	Video
2005	Treasure n tha Hood	Reverend Ike	
2005	Ganked	Shane Ross	Video
2005	Rebound	Preacher Don's Sidekick	
2006	Repos	Mr. Henderson	Video
2006	It Ain't Easy	-	Video
2007	Epic Movie	Harry Beaver	
2007	Norbit	Lord Have Mercy	
2007	Larry the Cable Guy's Christmas Spectacular	Wiseman	TV movie
2007	The Perfect Holiday	Delicious	
2008	First Sunday	Rickey	
2008	Adventures of Tha Blue Carpet Treatment	Himself (voice)	
2008	Lonely Street	Rodent	
2008	Internet Dating	Mickey	Video
2009	Young American Gangstas	Joe Joe Brown	
2010	Cats & Dogs: The Revenge of Kitty Galore	Seamus (voice)	
2012	The Obama Effect	MLK	
2013	Scary Movie 5	Blaine Fulda	
2014	School Dance	Darren	
2015	American Bad Boy	The Bruce	
2017	Father Figures	Hitchhiker (The Universe)	
2020	2 Minutes of Fame	Marques	
2021	The House Next Door: Meet the Blacks 2	Dr. Mamuwalde	
2021	For the Love of Money	Pastor G	
2025	One of Them Days	Lucky	
2026	72 Hours	Mike	

=== Television ===
Year	Show	Role	Notes
2002	NYPD Blue	Martel Cates	Episode: "Maya Con Dios"
2003–04	The Tracy Morgan Show	Freddie	Main Cast
2004–05	My Wife and Kids	Bobby Shaw	Recurring Cast: Season 5
2005	Love Lounge	Himself	Episode: "The Naked Truth"
2005	ComicView	Himself	Episode: "Episode #14.1" & "#14.21"
2005	Girlfriends	Rick Beatty	Episode: "Sleeping Dogs"
2005	Cuts	Barry	Recurring Cast: Season 2
2005–07	Wild 'n Out	Himself	Main Cast: Season 1–4
2005–08	The Boondocks	A Pimp Named Slickback (voice)	Guest: Season 1, Recurring Cast: Season 2
2006	Def Comedy Jam	Himself	Episode: "Episode #7.4"
2006–07	BET Hip Hop Awards	Himself/Host	Main Host
2007	Comics Unleashed	Himself	Episode: "Feb 20, 2007"
2007	Comedy Central Roast	Himself/Roastmaster	Episode: "Comedy Central Roast of Flavor Flav"
2007	Nick Cannon Presents: Short Circuitz	Himself	Main Cast
2008	Black Poker Stars Invitational	Himself	Main Guest
2009	Kathy Griffin: My Life on the D-List	Himself	Episode: "Kathy at the Apollo"
2012	Comics Unleashed	Himself	Episode: "Feb 6, 2012"
2016	Love & Hip Hop: Atlanta	Himself	Episode: "Lovers or Friends?"
2018–22	Atlanta	Willie	Episode: "Alligator Man" & "Light Skinned-ed"
2019	Town Bizzness	Himself	Episode: "Yukmouth in Portland"
2019	Black-ish	Perry	Episode: "Enough Is Enough"
2020	The Last O.G.	Fred	Episode: "Family Feud"

=== Stand-up comedy specials ===
Year	Title
2006	Katt Williams: The Pimp Chronicles Pt. 1
2006	Katt Williams Live
2007	Katt Williams: American Hustle
2008	Katt Williams: It's Pimpin' Pimpin'
2009	Katt Williams Presents Katthouse Comedy
2009	Katt Williams: Pimpadelic
2009	Katt Williams: The Katt Phenomenon
2010	Katt Williams: 9 Lives
2012	Katt Williams: Kattpacalypse
2015	Katt Williams: Priceless: Afterlife
2018	Katt Williams: Great America
2022	Katt Williams: World War III
2024	Katt Williams: Woke Foke
2026	Katt Williams: The Last Report

=== Video games ===
Year	Title	Role	Notes
2008	Grand Theft Auto IV	Himself	Voice role

=== Documentaries ===
Year	Film
2008	Pimpadelic
2009	Why We Laugh: Black Comedians on Black Comedy

== Discography ==
Title	Album details	Peak chart positions	
Title	Album details	US	US Heat
The Pimp Chronicles	Released: 2006; Label: Salient Media; Formats: CD, LP	—	—
It's Pimpin' Pimpin'	Released: January 29, 2009; Label: Warner Bros. Records; Formats: CD, LP	174	5
Pimpadelic	Released: April 17, 2012; Label: KattPack / Comedy Central Records; Formats: CD, LP	—	—
Kattpacalypse	Released: September 18, 2012; Label: KattPack / E1 Music; Formats: CD, LP	—	—
Live	Released: October 15, 2012; Label: Three T's Entertainment; Formats: CD, LP	—	—

== Awards and nominations ==
In 2007, Williams was nominated for the Teen Choice Awards Choice Comedian Award.

In 2018, he won the Emmy for Outstanding Guest Actor in a Comedy Series for his appearance on the show Atlanta.

In October 2025, Williams was awarded the honorary degree of Doctor of Humane Letters (LHD) from Miles College (Fairfield, Alabama), in recognition of his significant contributions to entertainment and culture.

Year	Award show	Category	Work	Result	Ref.
2007	Teen Choice Awards	Choice Comedian	—N/a	Nominated	
2018	Primetime Emmy Awards	Outstanding Guest Actor in a Comedy Series	Atlanta: Alligator Man	Won	
