= List of accolades received by American Factory =

Accolades
Award	Wins	Nominations

Totals (Note: Certain award groups do not simply award one winner. They acknowledge several different recipients, have runners-up, and have third place. Since this is a specific recognition and is different from losing an award, runner-up mentions are considered wins in this award tally. For simplification and to avoid errors, each award in this list has been presumed to have had a prior nomination.)
- Wins: 18
- Nominations: 27

American Factory is a 2019 documentary film produced by Steven Bognar, who also co-directed the film with Julia Reichert. The film is about a Chinese company repurposing a former car-manufacturing plant in the American city of Moraine, Ohio. It was the first picture produced by Higher Ground Productions, a production company established by Barack and Michelle Obama.

== Accolades ==
Award	Date of ceremony	Category	Recipient(s) and nominee(s)	Result	Ref(s)
Academy Awards	February 9, 2020	Best Documentary Feature	Steven Bognar, Jeff Reichert, and Julia Reichert	Won	
Ashland Independent Film Festival	February 9, 2020	Best Documentary Feature	Steven Bognar, Jeff Reichert, and Julia Reichert	Won	
British Academy Film Awards	February 2, 2020	Best Documentary	Steven Bognar and Julia Reichert	Nominated	
Chicago Film Critics Association Awards	December 14, 2019	Best Documentary	American Factory	Nominated	
Cinema Eye Honors	January 6, 2020	Outstanding Nonfiction Feature	American Factory	Won	
Cinema Eye Honors	January 6, 2020	Outstanding Direction	Steven Bognar and Julia Reichert	Won	
Cinema Eye Honors	January 6, 2020	Outstanding Editing	Lindsay Utz	Nominated	
Cinema Eye Honors	January 6, 2020	Outstanding Original Score	Chad Cannon	Nominated	
Cinema Eye Honors	January 6, 2020	Audience Choice Prize	American Factory	Nominated	
Cleveland International Film Festival	March 27—April 7, 2019	Local Heroes Competition	American Factory	Nominated	
Copenhagen International Documentary Film Festival	March 20—31, 2019	F:ACT Award	American Factory	Nominated	
Critics' Choice Documentary Awards	November 10, 2019	Best Director (Note: Tied with Peter Jackson for They Shall Not Grow Old.)	Steven Bognar and Julia Reichert	Won	
Critics' Choice Documentary Awards	November 10, 2019	Best Documentary Feature	American Factory	Nominated	
Critics' Choice Documentary Awards	November 10, 2019	Best Editing	Lindsay Utz	Nominated	
Critics' Choice Documentary Awards	November 10, 2019	Best Political Documentary	American Factory	Won	
Dallas-Fort Worth Film Critics Association Awards	December 16, 2019	Best Documentary	American Factory	Runner-up	
Directors Guild of America Awards	January 25, 2020	Outstanding Directorial Achievement in Documentary	American Factory	Won	
Dorian Awards	January 8, 2020	Documentary of the Year	American Factory	Nominated	
Florida Film Critics Circle	December 23, 2019	Best Documentary	American Factory	Nominated	
Georgia Film Critics Association Awards	January 10, 2020	Best Documentary	American Factory	Nominated	
Gotham Awards	December 2, 2019	Best Documentary	American Factory	Won	
Gotham Awards	December 2, 2019	Audience Award	American Factory	Nominated	
Hollywood Critics Association Awards	January 9, 2020	Best Documentary	American Factory	Nominated	
Houston Film Critics Society Awards	January 2, 2020	Best Documentary	American Factory	Nominated	
Independent Spirit Awards	February 8, 2020	Best Documentary Feature	American Factory	Won	
IDA Documentary Awards	December 7, 2019	Best Director	Steven Bognar and Julia Reichert	Won	
IDA Documentary Awards	December 7, 2019	Best Editing	Lindsay Utz	Nominated	
IDA Documentary Awards	December 7, 2019	Best Feature	American Factory	Nominated	
Los Angeles Film Critics Association Awards	December 8, 2019	Best Documentary	American Factory	Won	
Montclair Film Festival		Best Documentary	American Factory	Nominated	
National Board of Review	December 3, 2019	Top Five Documentaries	American Factory	Won	
National Society of Film Critics Awards	December 3, 2019	Best Nonfiction Film	American Factory	Runner-up	
Online Film Critics Society Awards	January 6, 2020	Best Documentary	American Factory	Nominated	
Peabody Awards	June 10, 2020	Documentary	American Factory	Nominated	
Primetime Emmy Awards	September 19, 2020	Outstanding Directing for a Documentary/Nonfiction Program	Steven Bognar and Julia Reichert	Won	
Primetime Emmy Awards	September 19, 2020	Outstanding Cinematography for a Nonfiction Program	Aubrey Keith and Erick Stoll	Nominated	
Primetime Emmy Awards	September 19, 2020	Outstanding Picture Editing for a Nonfiction Program	Lindsay Utz	Nominated	
Producers Guild of America Award	January 18, 2020	Outstanding Producer of Documentary Theatrical Motion Pictures	Steven Bognar, Jeff Reichert, and Julia Reichert	Nominated	
RiverRun International Film Festival	April 4—14, 2019	Best Documentary Feature	Steven Bognar and Julia Reichert	Won	
San Francisco Bay Area Film Critics Circle Awards	December 16, 2019	Best Documentary	American Factory	Nominated	
Sarasota Film Festival	April 13, 2019	Documentary Feature Jury Prize	American Factory	Won	
Sundance Film Festival	January 24—February 3, 2019	Directing Award: U.S. Documentary	Steven Bognar and Julia Reichert	Won	
Sundance Film Festival	January 24—February 3, 2019	U.S. Grand Jury Prize: Documentary	American Factory	Nominated	
Toronto Film Critics Association Awards	December 8, 2019	Allan King Documentary Awards	American Factory	Won	
Traverse City Film Festival	August 3, 2019	Founders Grand Prize Documentary D.A. Pennebaker Award	American Factory	Won	
Washington D.C. Area Film Critics Association Awards	December 8, 2019	Best Documentary	American Factory	Nominated	
