= White Earth =

White Earth/White Earths may refer to:

Anthropology

- Zaculeu ("White Earth"), pre-classic city of the Mam-Maya of Guatemala (Saqulew in modern orthography)
  - Saqulewab, "White Earths", referring to the Mam people in the Popol Vuh

United States

- White Earth, Minnesota, a census-designated place
- White Earth Indian Reservation in Minnesota
  - White Earth Band of Ojibwe
- White Earth River (Minnesota)
- White Earth, North Dakota, a small city
- White Earth River (North Dakota)

Science

- A special case derived from Earth climate simulations whereby the Earth is plunged into a state of total glaciation. Seems to provide statistical support for the Snowball Earth (also known as "White Earth") theory.

Entertainment

- The White Earth, a Miles Franklin Award-winning novel by Andrew McGahan
- White Earth (film), a documentary film nominated for an Academy Award
