= 2019 National Society of Film Critics Awards =

Annual US film awards ceremony

54th NSFC Awards
- Date: January 4, 2020

Highlights
- Best Film: Parasite

The 54th National Society of Film Critics Awards, given on 4 January 2020, honored the best in film for 2019.

== Winners ==
Winners are listed in boldface along with the runner-up positions and counts from the final round:

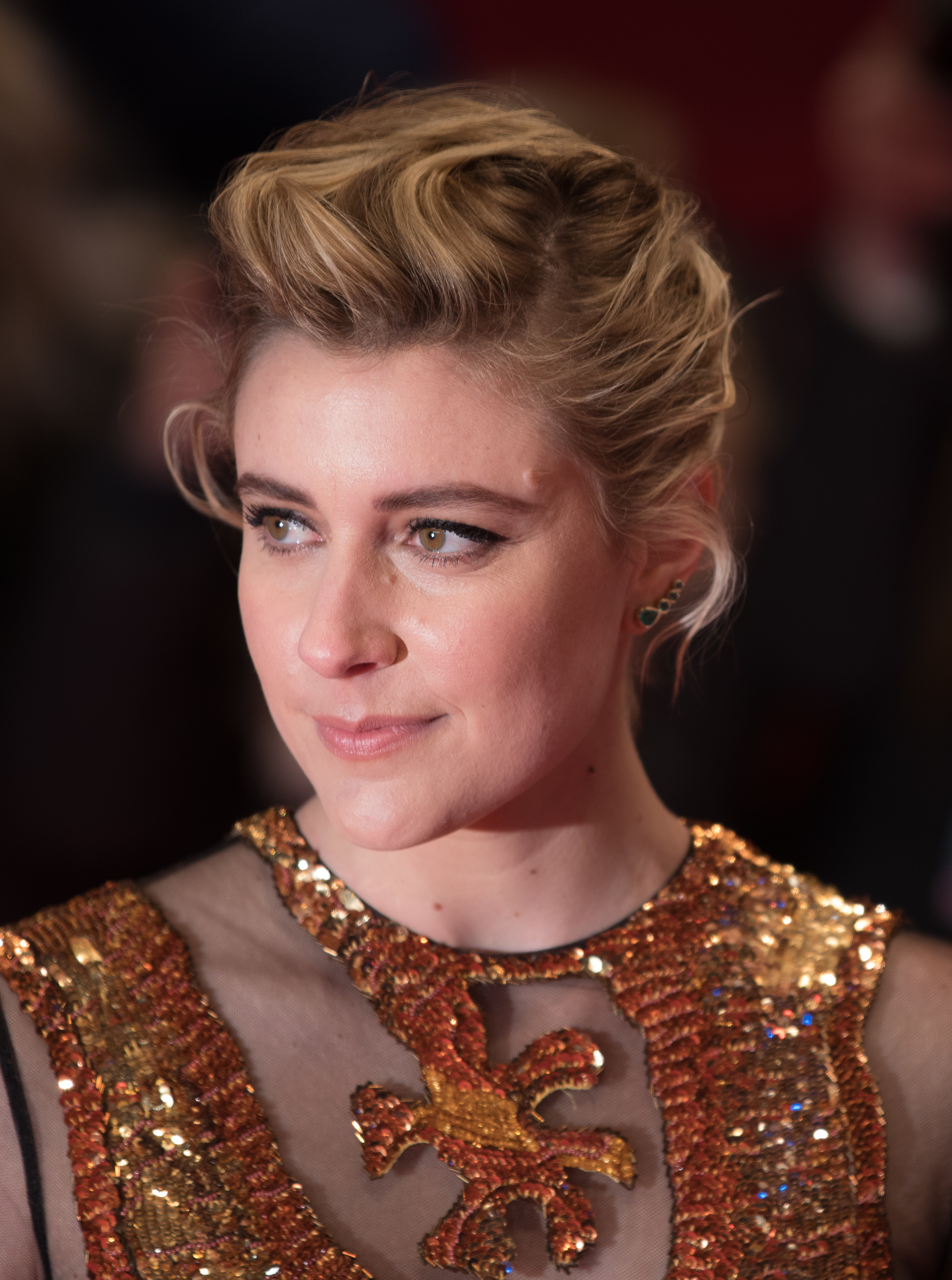
Greta Gerwig, Best Director winner

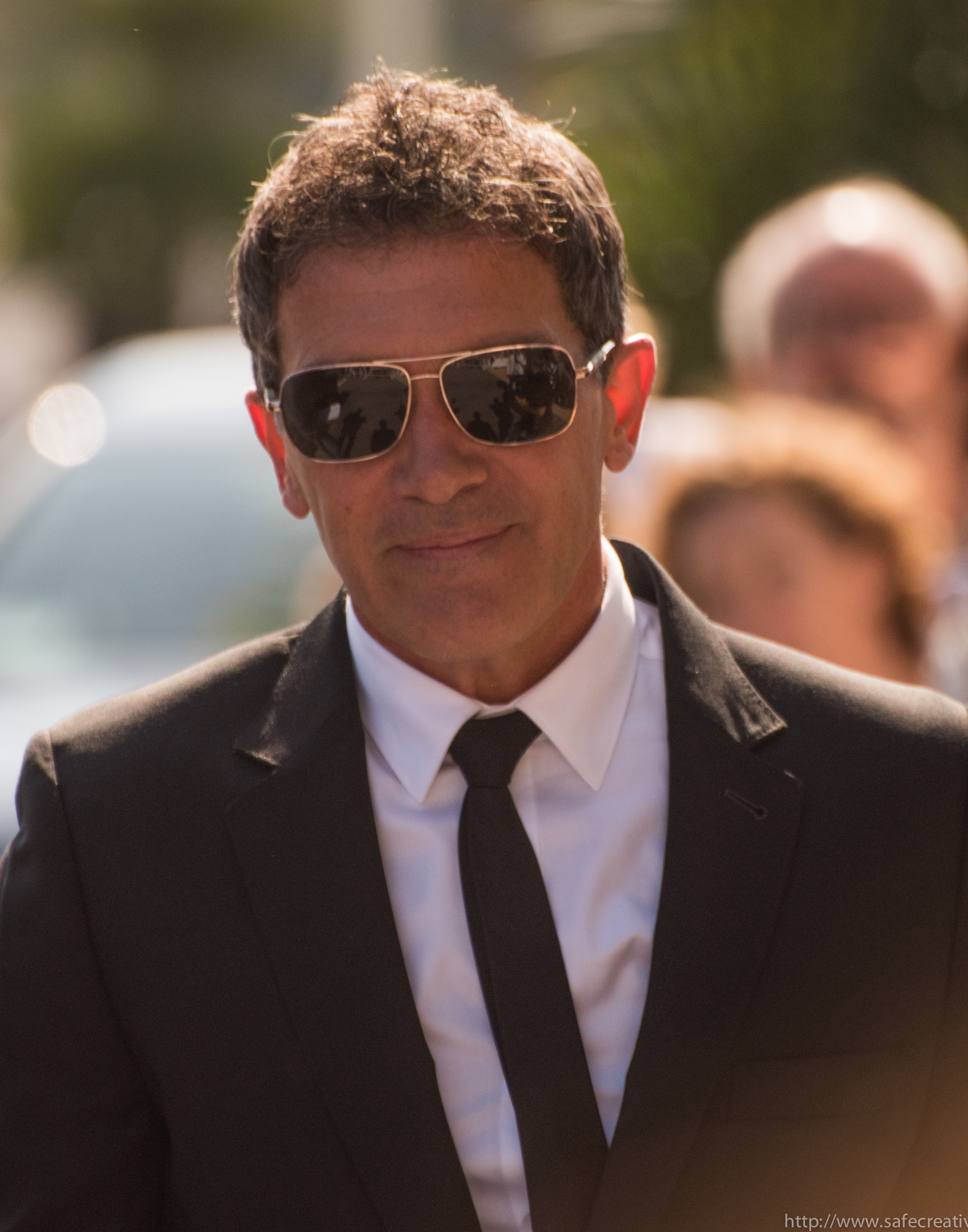
Antonio Banderas, Best Actor winner

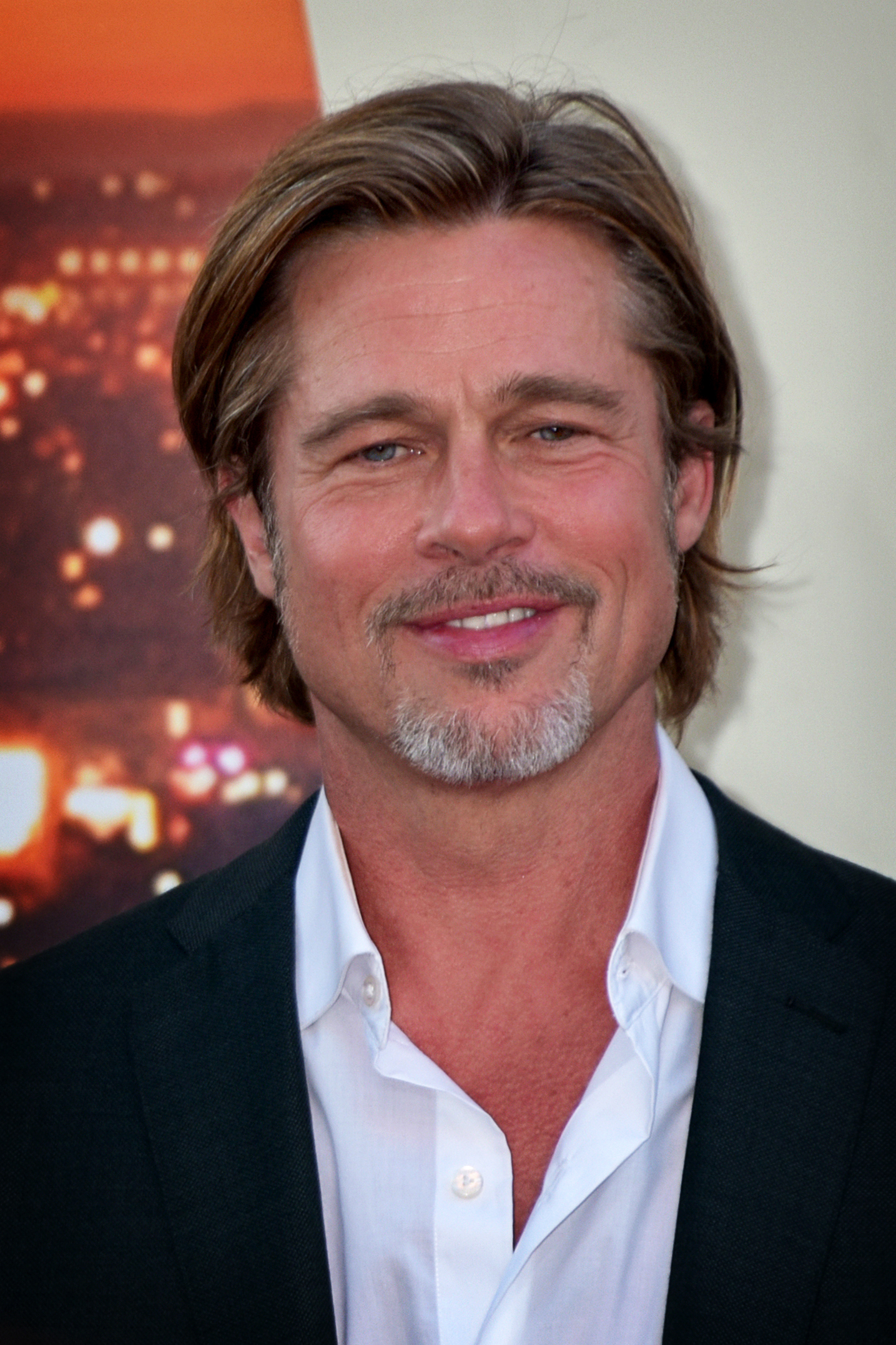
Brad Pitt, Best Supporting Actor winner

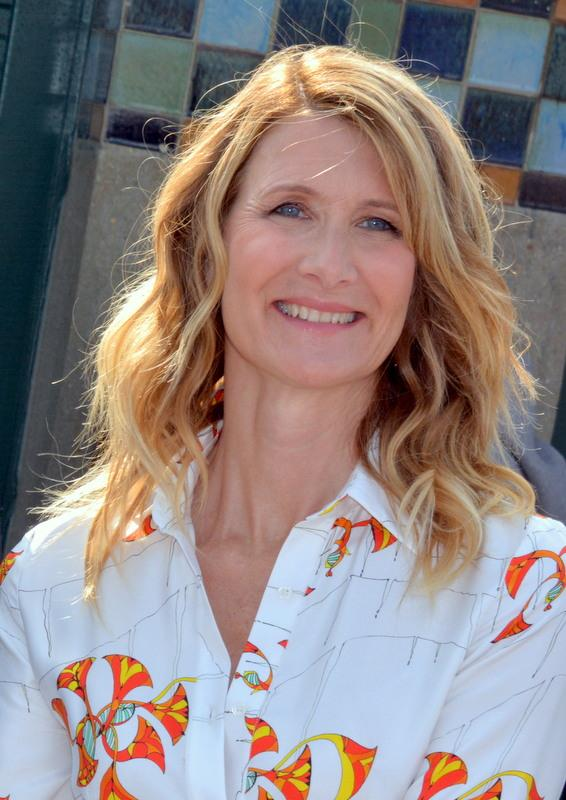
Laura Dern, Best Supporting Actress winner

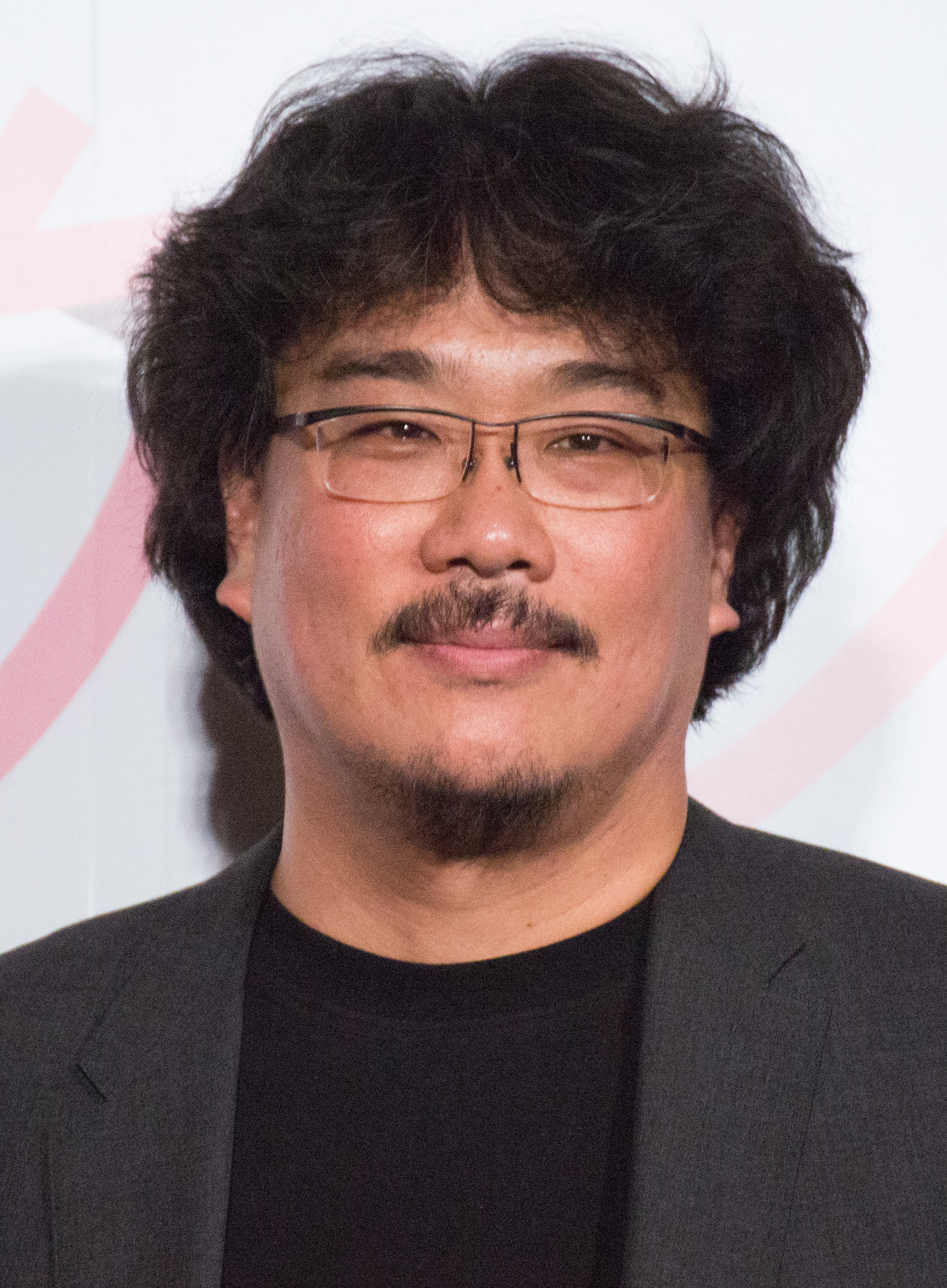
Bong Joon-ho, Best Screenplay co-winner

=== Best Picture ===
1. **Parasite** (44)
2. Little Women (27)
3. Once Upon a Time in Hollywood (22)

=== Best Director ===
1. **Greta Gerwig – Little Women** (39)
2. Bong Joon-ho – Parasite (36)
3. Martin Scorsese – The Irishman (31)

=== Best Actor ===
1. **Antonio Banderas – Pain and Glory** (69)
2. Adam Driver – Marriage Story (43)
3. Adam Sandler – Uncut Gems (41)

=== Best Actress ===
1. **Mary Kay Place – Diane** (40)
2. Zhao Tao – Ash Is Purest White (28)
3. Florence Pugh – Midsommar (25)

=== Best Supporting Actor ===
1. **Brad Pitt – Once Upon a Time in Hollywood** (64)
2. Joe Pesci – The Irishman (30)
3. Wesley Snipes – Dolemite Is My Name (18)
4. Song Kang-ho – Parasite (18)

=== Best Supporting Actress ===
1. **Laura Dern – Marriage Story and Little Women** (57)
2. Florence Pugh – Little Women (44)
3. Jennifer Lopez – Hustlers (26)

=== Best Screenplay ===
1. **Bong Joon-ho and Han Jin-won – Parasite** (37)
2. Quentin Tarantino – Once Upon a Time in Hollywood (34)
3. Greta Gerwig – Little Women (33)

=== Best Cinematography ===
1. **Claire Mathon – Portrait of a Lady on Fire and Atlantics** (41)
2. Robert Richardson – Once Upon a Time in Hollywood (29)
3. Yorick Le Saux – Little Women (22)

=== Best Non-Fiction Film ===
1. **Honeyland – Tamara Kotevska and Ljubomir Stefanov** (33)
2. American Factory – Steven Bognar and Julia Reichert (28)
3. Apollo 11 – Todd Douglas Miller (27)

=== Film Heritage Award ===
- "Private Lives, Public Spaces" at the Museum of Modern Art: Curated by Ron Magliozzi, this exhibit makes visible MOMA's collection of over one hundred years of vernacular moving images, most of them home movies by the famous and the unknown. Shown on multiple screens in the lobbies of MoMA's Titus theaters, they form a crazy quilt of personal and cultural history.
- Rialto Pictures, for distributing 4K restorations of beloved classics like Kind Hearts and Coronets (1949) and for presenting neglected work by international masters, such as Federico Fellini's The White Sheik (1952), and, for the first time, the uncut version of Francesco Rosi's Christ Stopped at Eboli (1979), with restored prints and upgraded subtitles.
