= Dave Chappelle: Live in Real Life =

- Release poster
- Directed by: Steven Bognar; Julia Reichert
- Produced by: Steven Bognar; Dave Chappelle; Julia Reichert
- Starring: Dave Chappelle
- Cinematography: Ian Cook
- Edited by: Kevin Jones, Jaime Meyers Schlenck, and Hannah Blair
- Production company: Pilot Boy Productions
- Release date: June 19, 2021 (Tribeca Film Festival)
- Running time: 120 minutes
- Country: United States
- Language: English

Dave Chappelle: Live in Real Life (originally titled Dave Chappelle: This Time This Place and advertised as Untitled Dave Chappelle Documentary) is a documentary film directed by Steven Bognar and Julia Reichert. The film details Dave Chappelle's 2020 comedy shows and musical concerts he put on in Yellow Springs, Ohio during the COVID-19 pandemic in the United States and the 2020 George Floyd protests.

== Background ==
Following closures of comedy clubs and venues due to the COVID-19 pandemic, and the murder of George Floyd, Dave Chappelle began hosting outdoor comedy and music shows in a cornfield in his home of Yellow Springs, Ohio. Chappelle created a COVID-19 bubble to protect artists via testing. The bubble suffered a few COVID-19 exposures. Filmmakers Steven Bognar and Julia Reichert, directors of the documentary American Factory, happen to be Chappelle's neighbours and were asked to direct the film.

== Release ==
The film was premiered at Tribeca Film Festival on June 19, 2021, at Radio City Music Hall.

Following controversy over jokes made in Chappelle's October 2021 Netflix special The Closer, distributors were not interested in the film and film festivals "uninvited" the film from being screened. Chappelle decided to take the film on tour to be shown in 10 arenas in cities across the United States and Canada and will have a limited theatrical run beginning November 19, 2021.

== Reception ==
Chappelle asked critics not to review the film.

In a positive review, Peter Debruge of Variety called the film "an impressive account of how the comedian found a way to host live stand-up shows during the jittery first summer of the COVID-19 pandemic, directed by Oscar-winning American Factory duo Julia Reichert and Steven Bognar".

The film has not yet been released to the general public.
