= Cao Dewang =

Chinese entrepreneur

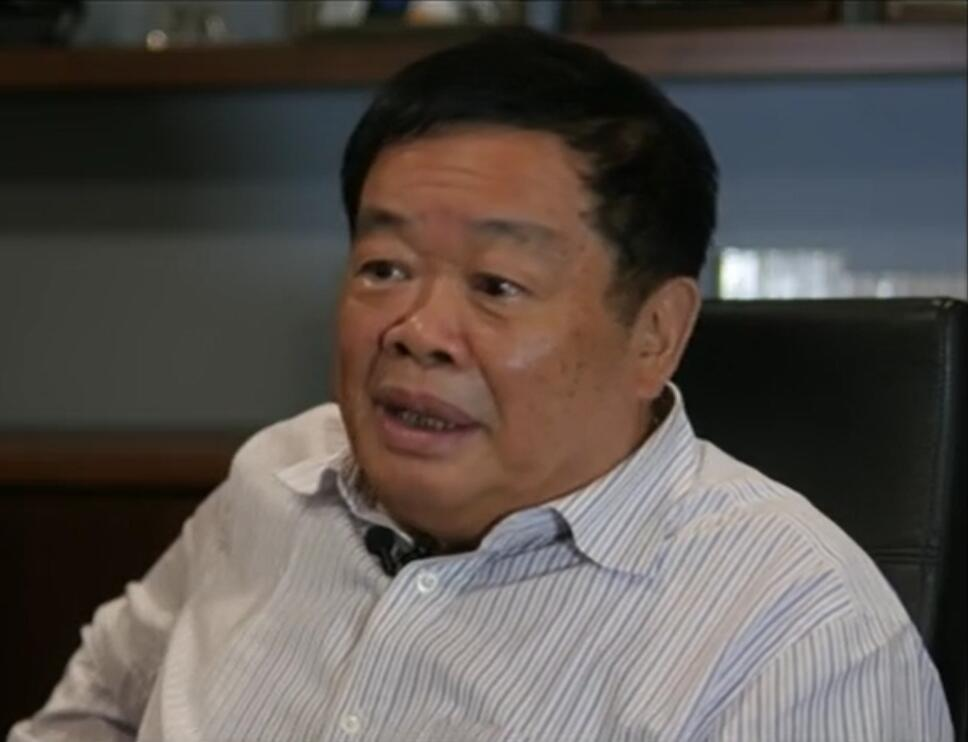
- Born: May 1946 (age 79); Fuqing, Fujian
- Other names: Cho Tak Wong
- Citizenship: Chinese (Hong Kong)
- Occupations: entrepreneur philanthropist
- Title: Chairman of: Fuyao Group; China Automobile Glass Association; Fujian Golf Player's Association
- Children: 3

Chinese name
- Chinese: 曹德旺
Transcriptions
Standard Mandarin
- Hanyu Pinyin: Cáo Déwàng
- Wade–Giles: Ts'ao Te-wang
Yue: Cantonese
- Jyutping: Cou4 Dak1 Wong6
Southern Min
- Hokkien POJ: Chô Tek Ōng

Cao Dewang (Chinese: 曹德旺; pinyin: Cáo Déwàng; born May 1946), also known as Cho Tak Wong or Tak Wong Cho, is a Chinese entrepreneur. He is the chairman of Fuyao Group, one of the largest glass manufacturers in the world. He is also a member of the Chinese People's Consultative Conference from Fujian, and chairman of both the China Automobile Glass Association and the Fujian Golf Players' Association.

== Early life ==
Cao was born in 1946 in Fuqing into an initially wealthy Fujianese family, which later lost all their wealth after fleeing the Chinese civil war. This reversal of fortune meant that Cao's early life was one of poverty. He was forced to leave school at the age of 14 to help support his family, initially by herding oxen. He taught himself Chinese. His first business was buying and selling tobacco leaves, which was illegal in Communist China as private enterprises were banned.

== Business career ==
In 1983, while working as a sales manager in a glass factory which produced glass for water meters, Cao saved enough money to buy out the factory. In 1985, he saw Japanese automakers bringing their manufacturing to China, and as a result, Cao directed his factory to begin producing automotive glass. In 1987, he established the Fuyao Group and in 1993 the company was listed on the Shanghai Stock Exchange.

In 2009, Cao was named Ernst & Young World Entrepreneur Of The Year.

His brother Cao Degan was the vice governor of Fujian province from 1998 to 2003.

In March 2005, his son took over Fuyao Group as the chief executive, while Cao retains the chairmanship. In the 2019 documentary American Factory, Cao is followed as he tours his new American addition to Fuyao. While overseeing the growth of his company in America, Cao leads fellow native Chinese to help grow the company in America. Nearly 200 workers moved to America leaving their lives behind to help grow Fuyao. Upon the new American factory opening, American workers pushed to unionize the factory claiming unsafe work conditions and unfair pay.

== Philanthropy ==
Cao is one of China's biggest philanthropists. He cites Andrew Carnegie, an American industrialist and philanthropist, as one of the main inspirations behind his charity work. He established the Heren Foundation, to which he has donated 300 million shares of his company. In 2012, he donated US$580 million to charity.

== Personal life ==
Cao is a devout Buddhist. He authored an autobiography titled A Heart like Bodhi (Chinese: 心若菩提; pinyin: Xīn ruò pútí) which was published in 2014. He is married to Chen Fengying, with whom he has three children: Cao Hui, Cao Yanping, and Cao Daiteng.
