= 8:46 (special) =

2020 performance by Dave Chappelle

- Directed by: Julia Reichert; Steven Bognar
- Written by: Dave Chappelle
- Starring: Dave Chappelle
- Production companies: Netflix
- Distributed by: YouTube
- Release date: June 12, 2020
- Running time: 27 minutes
- Country: United States
- Language: English

8:46 is a 2020 performance special by American comedian Dave Chappelle about violence against African Americans. The special was released via YouTube on June 12, 2020. The performance is not a traditional stand-up comedy special, as it was recorded at a private outdoor venue due to the COVID-19 pandemic in Ohio and features long stretches without humor. Critical consensus was positive for the comedy and the social commentary.

== Recording ==
The special was released via Netflix's YouTube channel "Netflix Is a Joke" at midnight on June 12, 2020, with no prior announcement from Netflix. This was directed by Oscar-winning documentarians Julia Reichert and Steven Bognar (American Factory). The recording was made at the private event "Dave Chappelle & Friends: A Talk with Punchlines" held outdoors on June 6, 2020, at the Wirrig Pavilion in Yellow Springs, Ohio, where an audience of roughly 100 observed social distancing rules and wore masks to prevent the spread of COVID-19.

== Inspiration ==
The event was entitled 8:46 in reference to the 8 minutes 46 seconds that police officer Derek Chauvin was originally reported to have kneeled on the neck of George Floyd, a Black man, murdering him, and Chappelle's time of birth on his birth certificate, being born at 8:46 AM.

== Content ==
What are you signifying? That you can kneel on a man's neck for 8 minutes and 46 seconds and feel like you wouldn't get the wrath of God? That's what is happening right now. It's not for a single cop, it's for all of it.

— Chappelle in 8:46 on the police who are complicit in the murder of George Floyd.

Chappelle touches on Floyd's murder and the subsequent protests, discusses the history of violence against African-Americans in the United States and their attempts to push back, and takes aim at conservative pundits Laura Ingraham and Candace Owens for their policing of the Black community.

== Album release ==
An album of the performance was released on October 29, 2021, by Third Man Records.

== Reception ==
CNN broadcaster Don Lemon called on celebrities to speak out about the George Floyd protests and Chappelle referenced this in the special saying that the people in the streets needed to lead and celebrities should follow. Lemon commented that he agreed with Chappelle's criticism. Lisa Respers France of CNN characterized the special as "hard-hitting". Jason Weisberger of the community blog BoingBoing embedded the YouTube broadcast with nothing more than the commentary "amazingly powerful". Writing for USA Today, Morgan Hines called the special "impactful" and sums up the consensus from social media as positive. Sean L. McCarthy of Decider urged readers to stream 8:46 in spite of the fact that much of the special is not intended to be comedic because of its social value and the comedy of the jokes that are interspersed in the performance. Randall Coburn of The A.V. Club quoted Chappelle who says, "This is not funny at all", writing it "is both true and not" and particularly calling attention to Chappelle's criticism of Candace Owens. Tomi Obaro of BuzzFeed News noted that the special focuses on Black men who have died but does not discuss police violence against Black women or transgender people.

The special was YouTube's top trending video in 2020.

Awards and nominations for 8:46
Year	Award	Category	Nominee(s)	Result
2021	Hollywood Critics Association TV Awards	Best Streaming Sketch Series, Variety Series, Talk Show or Comedy/Variety Special	8:46	Nominated
2021	NAACP Image Awards	Outstanding Variety Show (Series or Special)	8:46	Nominated
2021	Primetime Emmy Awards	Outstanding Variety Special (Pre-Recorded)	Dave Chappelle, Julia Reichert, Sina Sadighi and Steven Bognar	Nominated
2021	Primetime Creative Arts Emmy Awards	Outstanding Directing for a Variety Special	Julia Reichert, Steven Bognar and Dave Chappelle	Nominated
2021	Primetime Creative Arts Emmy Awards	Outstanding Writing for a Variety Special	Dave Chappelle	Nominated
2021	Producers Guild of America Awards	Outstanding Producer of Live Entertainment & Talk Television	Dave Chappelle, Julia Reichert, Sina Sadighi and Steven Bognar	Nominated
2022	Grammy Awards	Best Spoken Word Album	Dave Chappelle and Amir Sulaiman	Nominated

== See also ==
- Equal Justice Initiative, a non-profit that Chappelle promoted in the comments on the video
- List of original stand-up comedy specials distributed by Netflix
