= Moraine Assembly =

Automobile factory in Moraine, Ohio, United States

Coordinates: 39°42′5.37″N 84°12′52.42″W

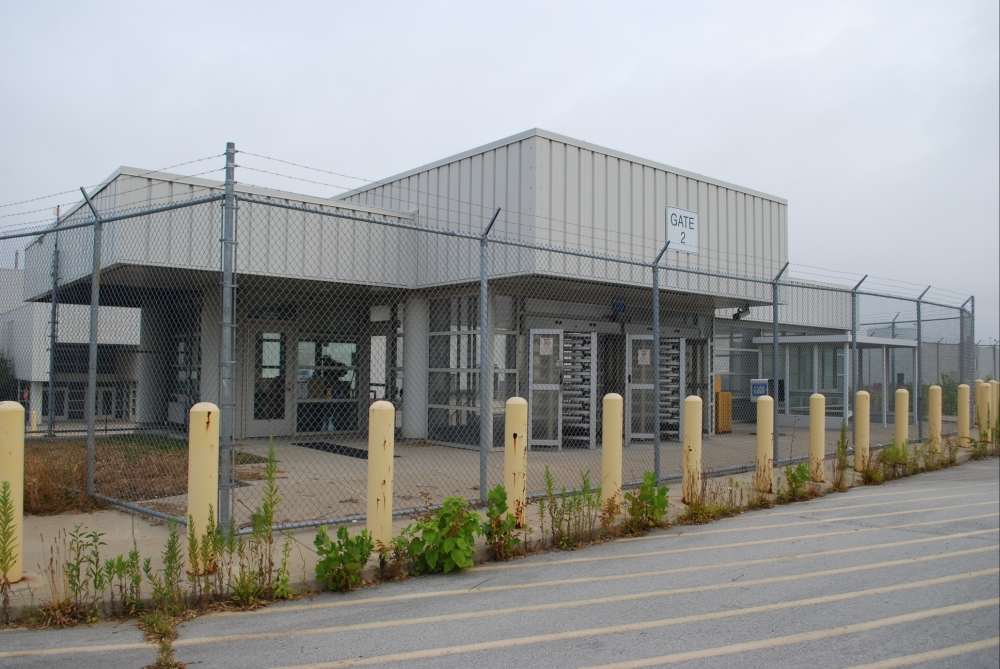
View of the factory in 2012

Moraine Assembly was a General Motors automobile factory in Moraine, Ohio, United States, a suburb of Dayton. A Frigidaire appliance plant had originally operated on the site from 1951 to 1979. Starting in 1981, the Chevrolet S-10 small pickup was produced. This same model was produced by Shreveport Assembly. In 1987 through 1994 the plant produced the rolling chassis for the Grumman LLV Postal Vehicle. From 2001 through 2008, the plant produced the GMT360 SUVs. The plant was closed in December 2008. In 2014, the facilities were acquired by Fuyao Glass to produce glass for vehicles.

== Plant closure ==
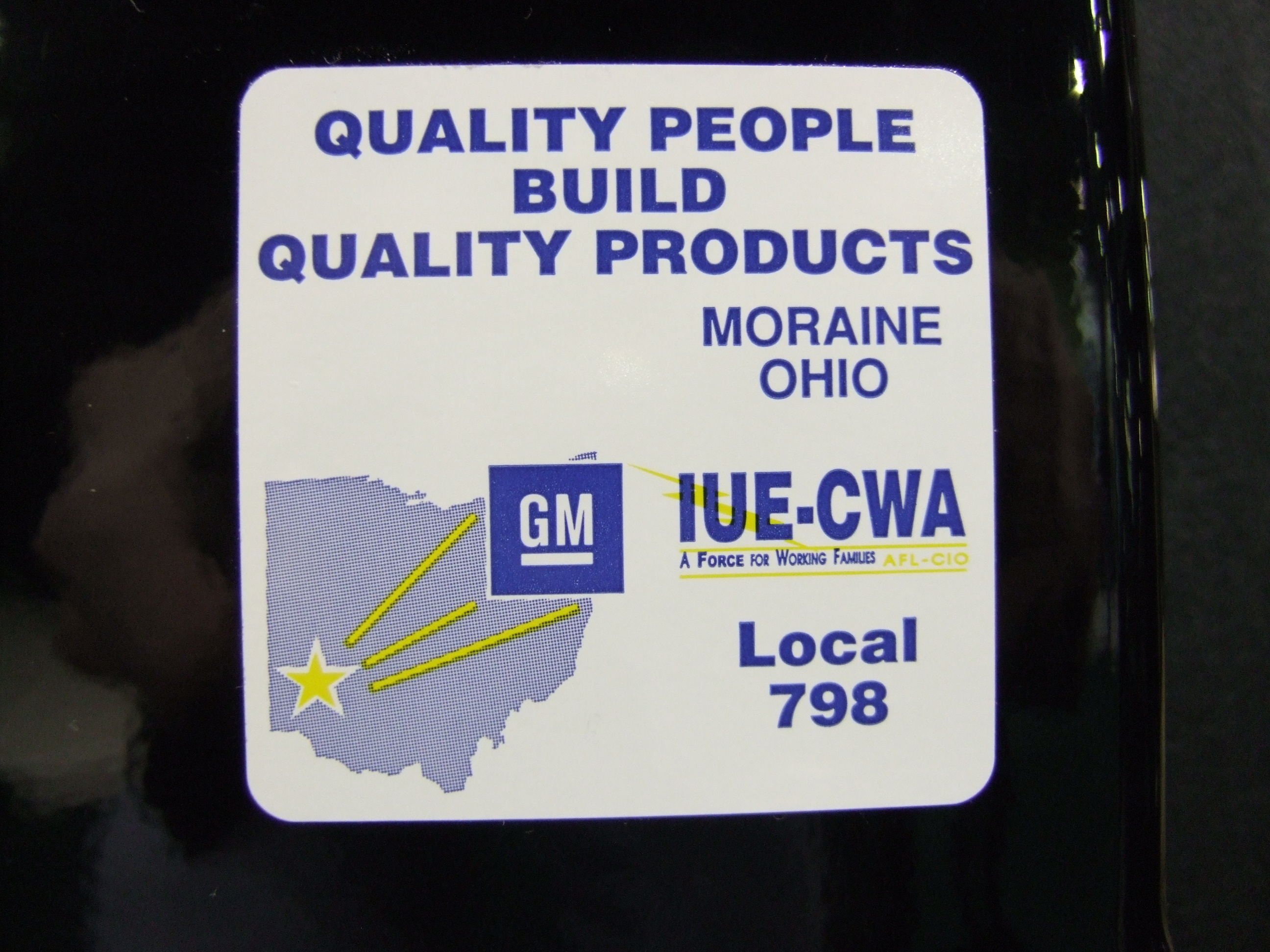
Sticker placed on vehicles assembled at the plant

On June 3, 2008, GM Chairman Rick Wagoner announced that the Moraine plant would close in December, citing high fuel prices and decreased demand for the SUV and trucks produced by the plant. There were no plans to reconfigure the plant to produce other products. The last vehicle that rolled off the line was a white GMC Envoy.

Workers at the plant in Moraine were given a letter on October 3, 2008, informing them that the plant would close in December. It stated that the final day of production would be December 23. At that time, the plant employed 2,400 people.

Originally, General Motors had planned several shutdown weeks in December. However, Lee said there would be no temporary shutdowns and the plant would operate until December 23. IUE-CWA President Jim Clark said, "IUE-CWA is deeply disappointed in General Motors’ refusal to keep the Moraine Assembly plant open. The announcement that the plant will be closed much earlier than initially stated will further hurt our members, their families and a Dayton community already rocked by plant closings and layoffs."

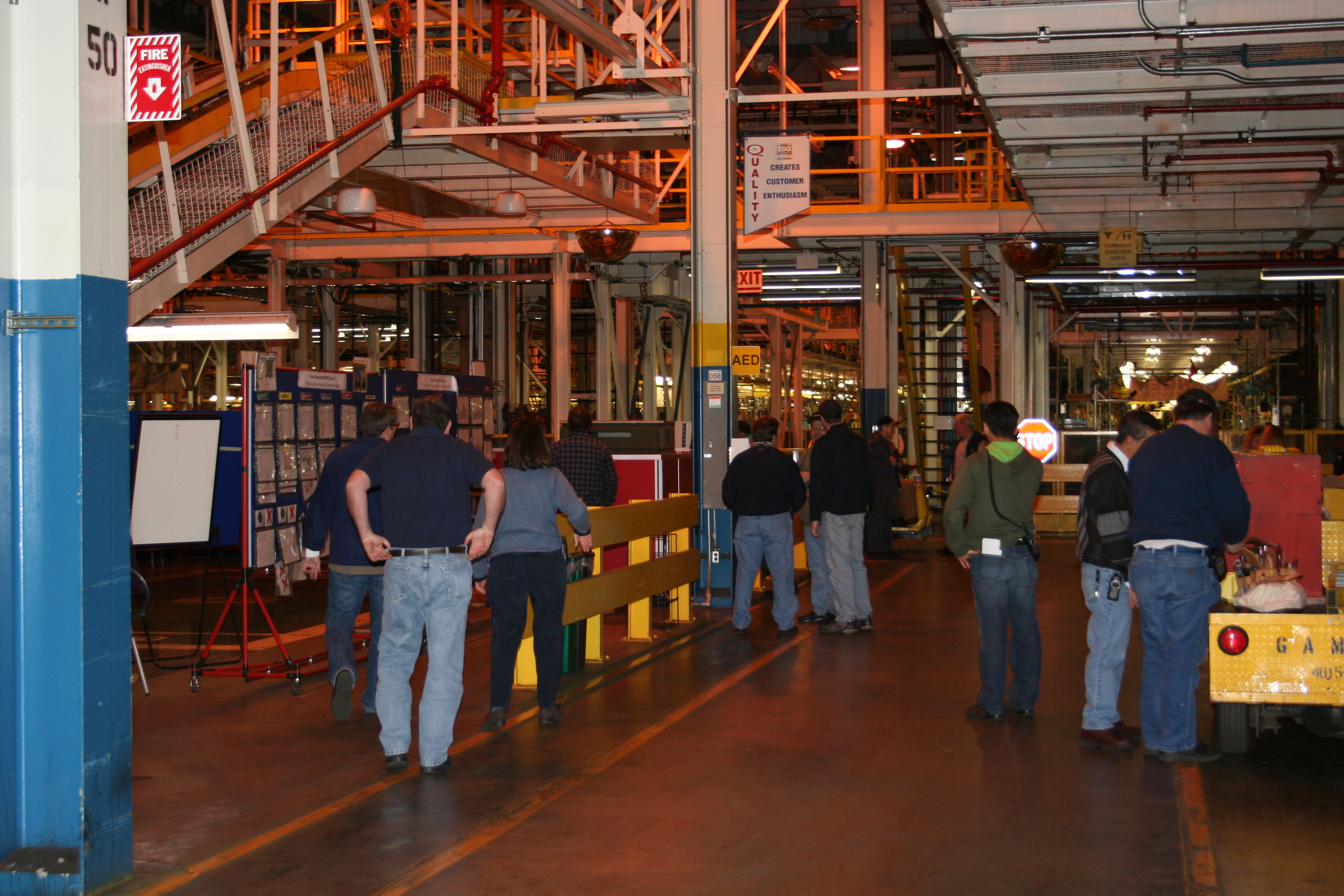

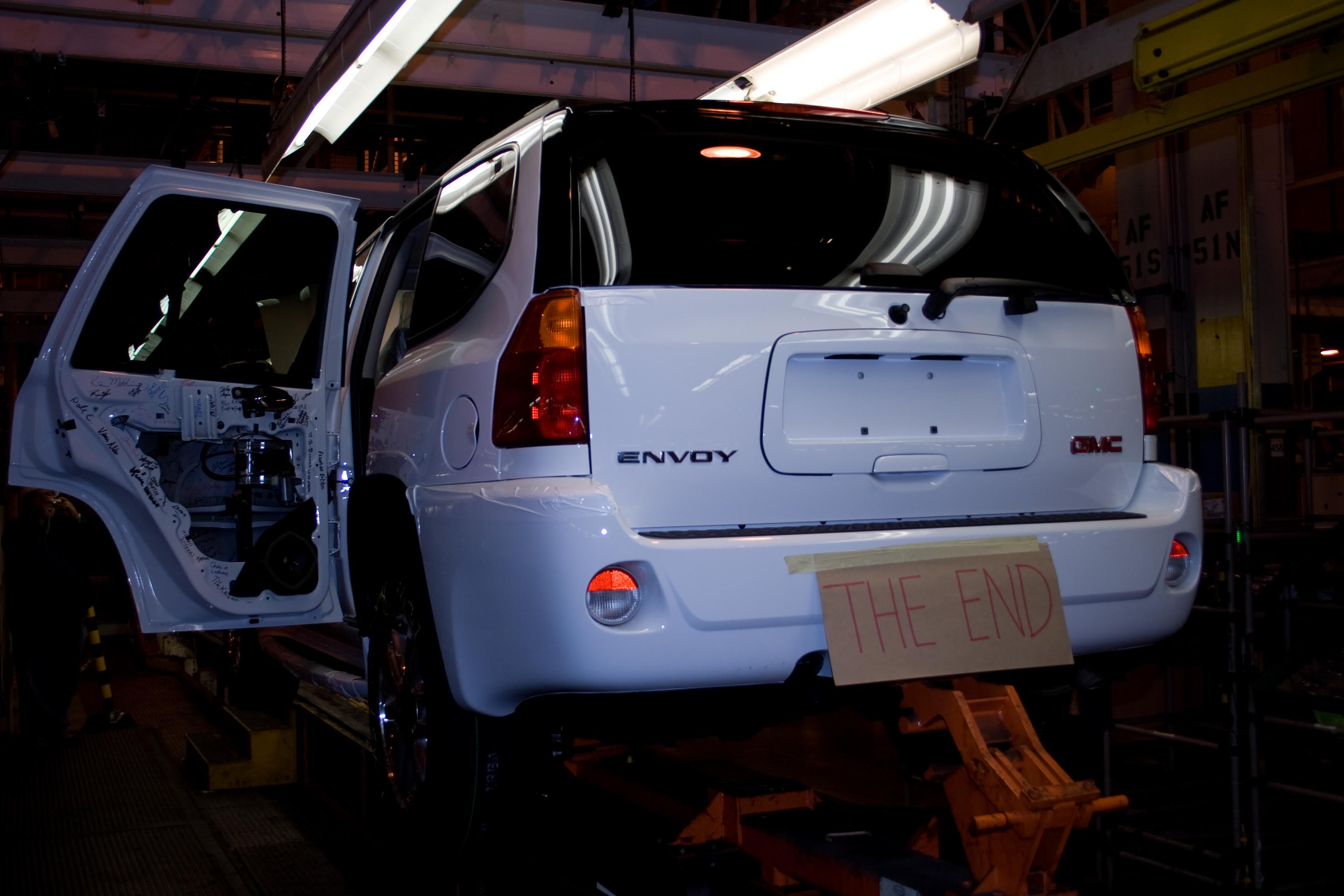

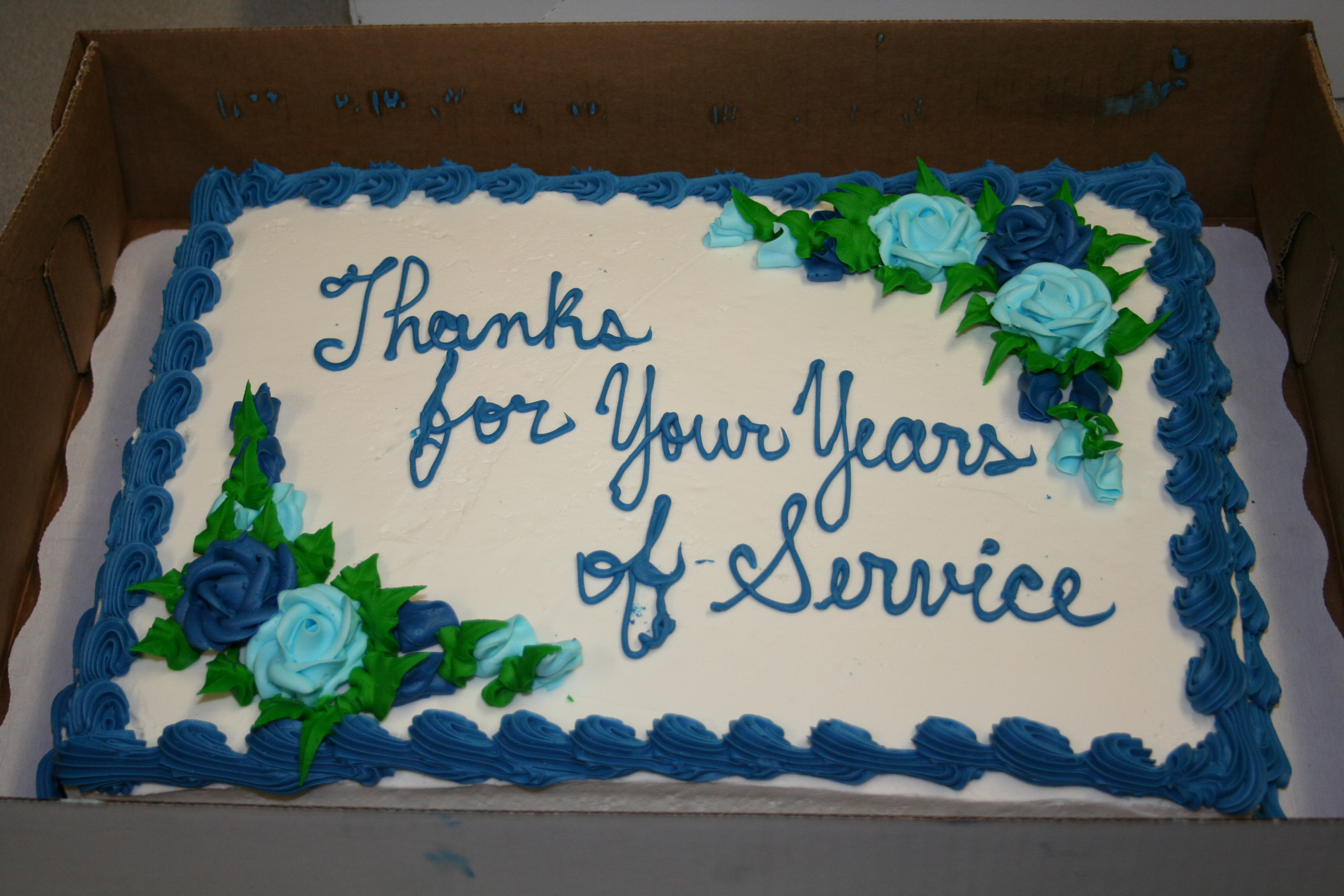

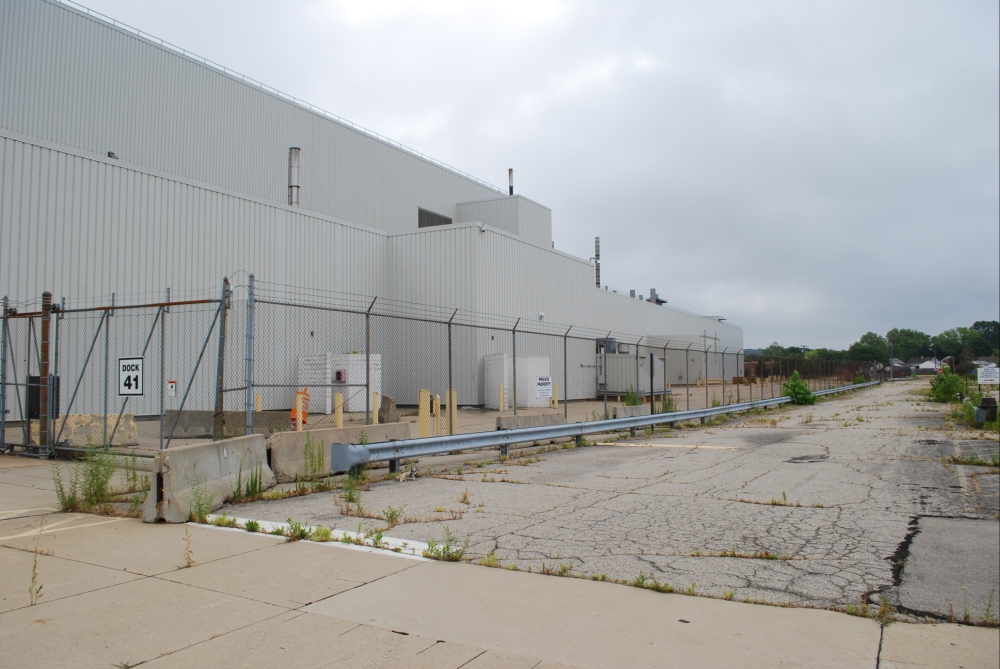

== Past products ==
1983–2004 Chevrolet S-10 Blazer
1983–2004 GMC S-15 Jimmy
1987-1994 Grumman LLV Chassis
1991–2004 Oldsmobile Bravada
1998–2009 GMC Envoy
2002–2009 Chevrolet TrailBlazer
2004–2007 Buick Rainier
2003–2008 Isuzu Ascender
2005–2009 Saab 9-7X

== Fuyao Glass ==
In 2014, GM Moraine Assembly was purchased from IRG by China-based Fuyao Glass Industry Group Co. Ltd. Fuyao manufactures automotive glass for GM and other automakers. Operations at the Fuyao plant began in late 2015. Fuyao Glass America's first customer was Hyundai Motor Company; additional clients added since startup include GM, Volkswagen, Fiat Chrysler, BMW, Honda, and US replacement-glass chain Safelite. The Fuyao plant employs over 2,000 workers. Carillon Historical Park in Dayton displays the final SUV made at Moraine Assembly next to the first windshield made by Fuyao Glass America.

By the end of 2016 the plant brought an estimated $280 million to the Ohio economy. Fuyao has invested $1 billion in its U.S. subsidiary, with long-term plans to grow to 5,000 employees in the United States.

On March 22, 2026, firefighters responded to a reported fire at Fuyao Glass America in Moraine, with local media reporting smoke and flames visible from the building.

== In popular culture ==
- Moraine Assembly's closing is the subject of the HBO short documentary, The Last Truck: Closing of a GM Plant. It was filmed by local directors Julia Reichert and Steve Bognar with the help of several Moraine Assembly workers. The film was nominated for the Academy Award for Best Documentary (Short Subject) in 2009.
- The Fuyao Glass plant is the focus of Netflix's American Factory, also made by Reichert and Bognar. It is the first film distributed by President Barack Obama and First Lady Michelle Obama's production company, Higher Ground Productions.
