= Growing Up Female (film) =

- Directed by: Julia Reichert; Jim Klein
- Distributed by: New Day Films
- Release date: 1971
- Running time: 50 minutes
- Country: United States
- Language: English

Growing Up Female is a 1971 American documentary film directed by Julia Reichert and Jim Klein. The film focuses on the socialization of American women and the effects of stereotypes placed by media, advertising, and personal relationships while following the lives of five young women and girls. Those interviewed include: Janelle (a 12-year-old girl), Terry (a 16-year-old attending a vocational school and studying cosmetology), Tammy (a working 21-year-old), Jessica Jones (a working 21-year-old mother with one daughter) and a Mrs. Russell (a married, working mother of three daughters).

The film has been described as one of the first films to emerge from the Women's liberation movement. In 2011, it was selected for preservation in the United States National Film Registry by the Library of Congress as being "culturally, historically, or aesthetically significant".
