= The Last Truck: Closing of a GM Plant =

2009 documentary film

- Directed by: Steven Bognar; Julia Reichert
- Country of origin: United States
- Original language: English

Production
- Running time: 42 minutes
- Production company: HBO Films

Original release
- Network: HBO
- Release: September 7, 2009

The Last Truck: Closing of a GM Plant (also known as The Last Truck) is a 2009 documentary film, directed by Steven Bognar and Julia Reichert and produced for HBO Films. The film follows the closure of the Moraine Assembly plant, a General Motors automobile factory in Moraine, Ohio, on December 23, 2008.

== Production ==
Reichert and Bognar spoke to several hundred of the nearly 3,000 workers at the plant who were to lose their jobs as a result of the closure. Lacking access to film inside the plant itself, the filmmakers supplied some of the workers with Flip Video Mino cameras to smuggle into the factory, allowing them to acquire footage of some of the final vehicles being assembled there.

== Accolades ==
The Last Truck was nominated for the Academy Award for Best Documentary (Short Subject) in 2009.

== See also ==
- Roger and Me, the 1989 Michael Moore documentary film similar in content
- American Factory, the 2019 documentary by the same filmmakers chronicling the subsequent takeover of the factory by a Chinese magnate; about a minute of this film was used as the introduction.
