= A Lion in the House =

2006 American documentary film about childhood cancer

- Directed by: Steven Bognar and Julia Reichert
- Release date: 2006
- Country: US
- Language: English

A Lion in the House is a 2006 American documentary film directed by Steven Bognar and Julia Reichert that explores the impact of childhood cancer on five different families throughout the span of six years in Ohio. The 225-minute long documentary, which took eight years to complete, follows the lives of cancer patients Justin Ashcraft, Al Fields, Alexandra Lougheed, Jen Moone, and Timothy Woods as they are treated at the Cincinnati Children's Hospital Medical Center.

The film premiered in January 2006 at the Sundance Festival and was broadcast on PBS in two segments on June 21 and June 22, 2006. The film has earned numerous awards and promoted pediatric cancer awareness.

== Development ==
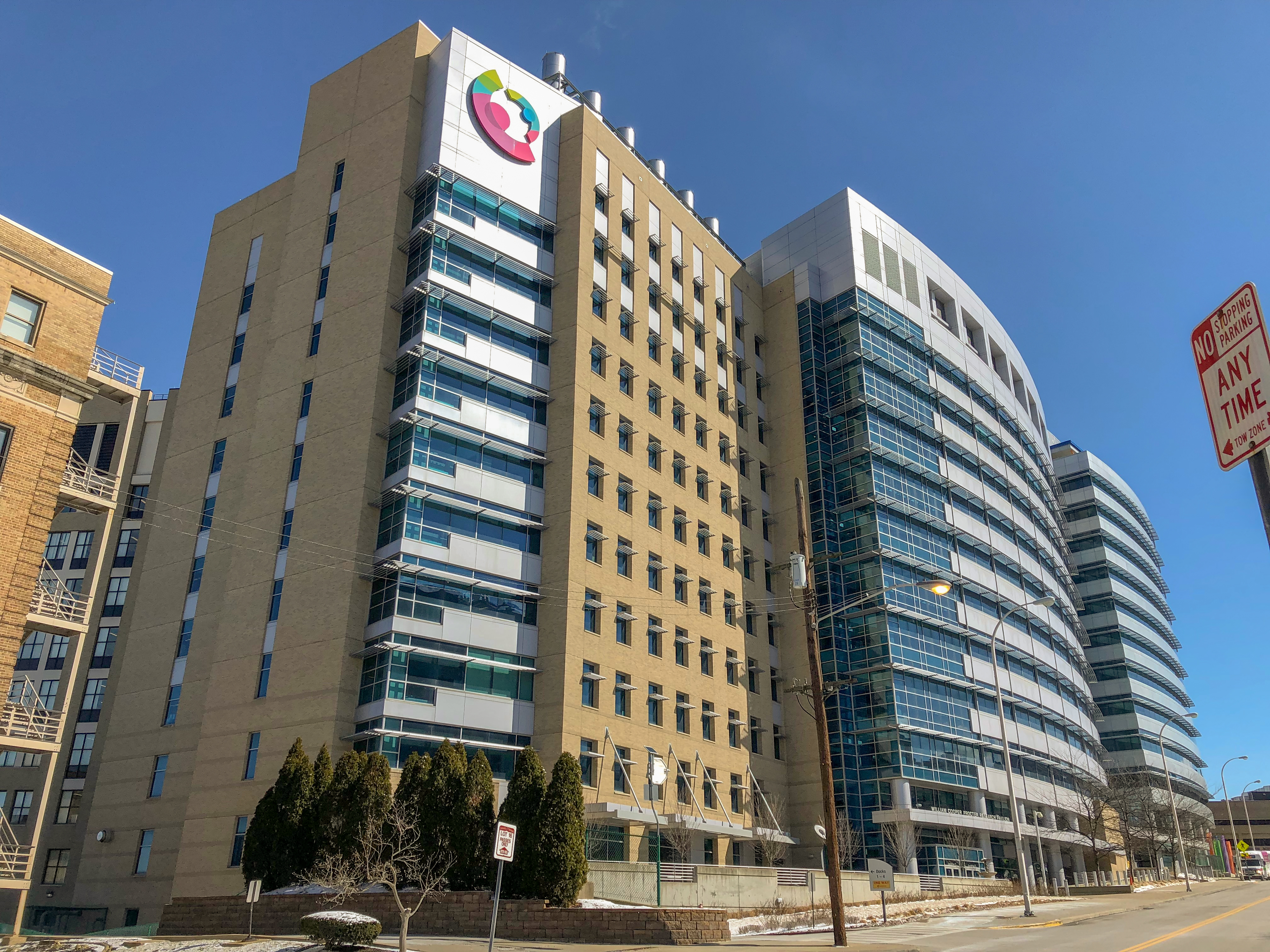
Cincinnati Children's Hospital Medical Center

In early 1997, Julia Reichert received a call from Dr. Robert Arceci, the former chief of the Hematology and Oncology Department at the Cincinnati Children's Hospital Medical Center. Arceci was searching for filmmakers who would be willing to film a long-term documentary about children and their families coping with cancer. Reichert was initially hesitant about this proposal seeing as how, unbeknownst Arceci at the time, Reichert's seventeen-year-old daughter had experienced lymphoma cancer in 1996. Reichert and Bognar ultimately agreed to take on the responsibility of filming and editing the documentary.

The title of the documentary stems from an Isak Dinesen quote: "You know you are truly alive when you are living among lions." Reichert intended for the "lion" in this quote to represent cancer and to further show how "incredibly alert and fiercely protective" parents can be when their child faces a life-threatening disease.

In July 1997, Reichert and Bognar finally begin filming the documentary with Sony VX-1000 cameras. They were given wide access to film in the hospital's Hematology/Oncology department. Originally, Bognar and Reichert began filming the lives of eight families. This number eventually narrowed down to five once Bognar and Reichert began to connect especially with the Ashcrafts, the Fields, the Lougheeds, the Moones, and the Woods families.

== Summary ==
The documentary film looks at the lives of five children and their families as they fight and cope with childhood cancer over the course of six years. Timothy Woods is diagnosed with Hodgkin's lymphoma while Alexandra Lougheed, Justin Ashcraft, and Jennifer Moone are diagnosed with leukemia. Alex Fields battles non-Hodgkin's lymphoma. The documentary not only reveals the personal lives of the children, but shows medical decision-making processes among pediatric oncology healthcare professionals in the hospital. Throughout the course of the six years, some children survive their diseases while others do not.

== Children featured ==
=== Timothy Woods ===
The documentary begins in Cincinnati, Ohio, with the introduction of fifteen-year-old Timothy Woods (referred to as Tim). It is explained that Tim was diagnosed with Hodgkin's lymphoma, a cancer of the lymph node glands. His symptoms, which were initially dismissed by doctors, manifested through a persistent cough and swollen neck that became progressively worse with time. It is also explained that eventually after more tests, Tim finally had to be rushed to the Cincinnati Children's Hospital's emergency department for immediate treatment.

Tim is shown to live with his sister, adopted brother, various other family members, and mother, who is the head of the household. Tim admits that he enjoys the attention he receives from his family and doctors surrounding his cancer treatment. Throughout the course of his disease, Tim struggles with taking his medications and complying with his oncologists' orders to gain weight in order to build immunity and facilitate the chemotherapy process. He is caught lying about his weight several times. Tim's mother, Marietha, explains that "every day is a fight with him" when it comes to getting him to comply with his medical treatment. One of Tim's nurses also explains that Tim's non-compliance may stem from a desire to uphold and protect his image. He is forced to receive a nasogastric tube after this ordeal. Tim misses an entire year of school.

Tim's psychiatrist, Dr. Barbra Heidt, describes how Tim's past trauma of losing his father, in addition to the cancer, has limited his social life. Nevertheless, Tim is shown to have a humorous and positive personality, stating that he would one day like to be a doctor, counselor, or an advocate for the homeless. After gaining weight and undergoing additional chemotherapy, Tim develops pain in his esophageal area and shows signs of enlarged lymph nodes. His mother and oncologists fear that the cancer cells may be returning with greater intensity. A biopsy, bone marrow tests, and several scans are performed, which confirm that the cancer cells do indeed remain in his neck. In light of this, Tim is put under a new experimental chemotherapy regime and responds well to it.

Tim celebrates his birthday with his family on the 4th of July. He begins to attend a special program at his school for children who are behind several grade levels. He also starts to work at McDonalds, showing greater responsibility and maturity in his behavior. The hospital staff arranges a special trip for him and his mother to visit Chicago. After their trip, Tim falls ill. His cancer returns and remains resistant to every combination of chemotherapy drugs that the doctors provide. As a result, Tim grows fearful of the reality of his situation. His mother also struggles to confront the possibility of his imminent death. Tim's condition deteriorates dramatically over the course of a few weeks. He is unable to breathe properly and passes away shortly after his doctors order a DNR on him.

=== Alexandra Lougheed ===
Seven-year-old Alexandra Lougheed (referred to as Alex) is the second child to be introduced into the documentary film. She was diagnosed with leukemia at the age of five and has since then undergone two years of treatment, several relapses, and multiple bone marrow transplants. At the moment of her introduction, she is in remission. Her mother, Judy Lougheed, mentions that Alex's primary doctor had once told the family that "there is nothing to be done" about the disease and that Alex should begin receiving hospice care. Dr. Paul Jubinsky, the attending physician at Cincinnati Children's Hospital for that month, believes that there is hope in Alex's case. He uncovers and suggests a new experimental treatment for her, which she eventually begins taking.

One of Judy's priorities is to prevent her daughter from experiencing severe complications from chemotherapy treatments. Alex's medical team thus avoids giving her treatments with harsh side effects. Alex is sent to a summer camp meant for children with cancer called "Camp Friendship", initially disliking it before eventually enjoying the experience. Alex is voted the child with the "cutest personality" at the camp and is shown socializing, playing in the outdoors, and singing songs with the other children and camp counselors. After experiencing an entire summer in remission, she relapses and is forced to undergo additional chemotherapy. Her condition unexpectedly deteriorates, as she develops a high fever and a swollen right eye that is unable to remain open. The oncologists suspect that an infection is occurring, but they remain unsure and fearful that it is a fungus. Alex goes through a minor surgery that is intended to uncover the source of her infection. The doctors uncover only thickened tissue and pus within the site of swelling, still remaining unsure about the cause of infection.

Alex's father, Scott, agrees to donate some of his white blood cells to Alex in order to help boost her Absolute Neutrophil Count (ANC) levels. Her ANC levels begin to improve, meaning that the transfusions are working. It is later discovered that Alex does indeed have a fungal infection within her cheek bones. Her mother is adamant against any surgeries that might disfigure Alex's face while her father believes that surgical intervention should be done. In addition to this setback, Alex's leukemia returns. A bone marrow test confirms the presence of leukemia cancer cells. Alex's parents decide not to pursue any more medical actions seeing as how Alex's immune system is too weakened to fight the cancer any longer. She is sent home and cared for by hospice nurses.

During one particular week, Alex's father believes that it might be a good idea to return her to the hospital for one more round of chemotherapy treatment. Despite Alex's fierce opposition to this idea, Scott takes her to receive treatment. Twelve hours after this ordeal, Alex dies at the age of eight. Six months after her death, her family still remains on the road to recovery from Alex's death.

=== Justin Ashcraft ===
Justin Ashcraft is nineteen years old during his introduction in the documentary. He was diagnosed with leukemia at the age of nine and has since then endured ten years of cancer treatment—longer than almost any other child in the country. His endurance with cancer has even drawn national television attention. As a recent high school graduate, Justin is offered the option to pursue a new experimental treatment from his oncologist. In order to accomplish this, he needs to have surgery to have a chemotherapy port placed in his head. Before the operation, Justin is also given the opportunity to sign a Living Will, but he refuses to sign the documents out of hope that the procedure and treatments will be successful. Justin is described as a shy teenager who is optimistic and humorous about his cancer. He does not fear the prospect of death associated with his disease.

After the surgical recovery, Justin experiences mild swelling due to the steroids that are a component of his treatment. He unexpectedly has a stroke after the initiation of his new treatment, forcing Justin's oncology team to search for a new treatment. After three months of post-stroke physical therapy, Justin's cancer returns. Debbie, Justin's mother, takes six weeks off of work, to take him to a hospital in Houston, Texas, that may offer promising treatment options. Throughout this ordeal, Justin's brother reveals that he is severely clinically depressed because of Justin's cancer. Family tension ensues.

The six weeks of chemotherapy in Houston prove to be ineffective, so Justin is instructed to resume his regular triple dose of methotrexate. Justin's legs become paralyzed and he begins to develop lesions in his brain. A biopsy is performed to determine the cause of his neurological deterioration. The family is approached by more physicians who start mentioning the possibility of putting Justin under hospice care. Debbie remains optimistic despite Justin's severely low oxygen saturation levels which are almost incompatible with human life. The family congregates to discuss the possibility of letting Justin die peacefully instead of making him receive constant harsh chemotherapy treatment. Justin's condition surprisingly stabilizes.

His period of stabilization does not persist for long however. Over the next few weeks, Justin's condition fluctuates drastically. His oxygen saturation levels drop to extremely low levels and his breathing becomes heavy and labored. Debbie and Dale decide to not take any additional medical action, allowing Justin to eventually die in his sleep. Debbie reasoned that his suffering should not have continued any further.

=== Jennifer Moone ===
Jennifer Moone is six years old when she is first introduced into the documentary. She was recently diagnosed with leukemia after a bone marrow aspirate procedure confirmed the presence of the disease. Her mother Beth, an investigator for the Ohio Attorney General's Office, is initially devastated by the diagnosis. Both Beth and Jennifer are forced to navigate the complicated world of cancer treatment together at the Cincinnati Children's Hospital Medical Center for the first time. Beth feels as if she has no other option but to leave her job in order to take care of Jennifer full-time, which she does. Beth misses her busy work life at first, but eventually decides not to return to her job.

After two years of chemotherapy, Jennifer finally reaches the end of her treatment. Her family celebrates with a house party. With Jennifer's future looking optimistic, Beth feels motivated to raise money for leukemia research through a Chicago Marathon. As Jennifer progresses through school, the teachers notice that Jennifer's IQ score has dropped fifteen points. Jennifer has difficulty reading and sounding out words and consequently requires specialized tutoring from her school. Jennifer's oncology team explains that it is not uncommon for children to experience cognitive impairments as a result of chemotherapy and radiation therapy exposure.

Towards the end of the documentary, Jennifer states that she is more active in sports and that, one day, she aspires to be a teacher or doctor for children.

=== Alex Fields ===
Alex Fields, also known as Al, is the last child to be introduced in the documentary. He was recently diagnosed with non-Hodgkin's lymphoma, which was originally misdiagnosed by doctors as asthma. His first experience with chemotherapy is particularly stressful for him. Alex's mother, Regina, also has an especially difficult time adjusting to his treatments and hospital visits. As a full-time nursing aid at a nursing home, Regina finds it difficult to take time off from work and to afford his medications. Their insurance does not cover all the expenses of treatment. Al is a witty and outgoing child. He finds out that he has been invited to attend a summer camp for kids with cancer in Colorado. He becomes very excited, but shortly after, loses hope of attending once his oncologists inform him that he has to receive additional chemotherapy in the summer. Al's chemotherapy treatments had already been delayed by several weeks due to medical complications, so his medical team strongly advised him not to go to Colorado. This event frustrates Al and his mother.

After fifteen months of chemotherapy, Al becomes healthier, and his doctors inform him that he is nearing the end of his treatment. The oncologists believe that the cancer will not return. Although Regina expresses happiness for Al's good health, she is concerned about Al's behavioral problems at school. He experiences academic suspension several times but nevertheless feels like he has become "wiser" because of his entanglement with cancer.

== Themes ==
The documentary involves multiple themes dealing with cancer survivorship, caregiving, and cancer treatment disparities among families of different socioeconomic levels. These themes have helped spark widespread discussion and awareness about pediatric cancer in the United States.

=== Caregiving ===
Pediatric oncology caregiving usually requires more follow-ups with healthcare professionals as well as more family involvement in the medical decision-making process. In the documentary, the parent caregivers seem to manage their emotions in such a way that fosters and inspires resilience in their ill children, even during critical medical-making decisions. For example, within the Ashcrafts family, Debbie describes how she feels the need to appear emotionally strong in front of her son in order to help him feel hopeful about his condition. In the Woods family, Marietha also explains how she and Tim naturally build and feed on each other's willpower to endure the hardships of his cancer together.

=== Survivorship ===
There are a variety of emotions that arise from cancer survivorship. A common emotion displayed amongst almost all of the children in the documentary involve a fear of the unknown. For example, Al expresses fear when an abnormality appears on his body scans, even though he is finished with his chemotherapy and deemed healthy enough to return home. Such an abnormality, coupled with the indirect answers provided by the doctors, prompts Al to feel anxious and uncertain about his future. Tim also finds the reality of his persistent cancer frightening and depressing to reflect upon. As a result, he engages in activities that distract his mind from the disease.

=== Healthcare disparities ===
The documentary reveals several situations in which disparities based on income level affect the diagnosis, treatment, and outcomes of childhood cancer. Reichert argues that "poor families living on the edge can fall way—just right below the edge, if they are hit with cancer." It can be observed throughout the film that healthcare disparities are more prevalent in disadvantaged families. For example, Marietha, a single parent, struggles with securing transportation to the Hospital since she does not own a car. Regina as well has to deal with financial barriers around affording Al's medications. Reichert and Bognar hoped to highlight these issues within the film and hopefully spark changes that improve cancer support systems for socioeconomically disadvantaged families.

== Awards ==
A Lion in the House has earned and been nominated for many awards, including:

- Primetime Emmy Awards 2007 for Exceptional Merit in Nonfiction Filmmaking.
- Best Documentary at the 2007 Nashville Film Festival.
- Special Jury Prize at the 2006 Full Frame Documentary Film Festival.

=== Nominee ===
- Film Independent Spirit Awards 2007: Best Documentary
- Sundance Film Festival 2006: Documentary
- Village Voice Film Poll 2006: Best Undistributed Film
