= Seeing Red (1983 film) =

1983 film

- Directed by: Jim Klein; Julia Reichert
- Produced by: Jim Klein; Julia Reichert
- Starring: Bill Bailey; Dorothy Healey; Howard "Stretch" Johnson
- Cinematography: Stephen Lighthill; Sandi Sissel; Martin Duckworth
- Edited by: James Klein; Julia Reichert
- Music by: David K. Dunaway
- Distributed by: New Day Films
- Release date: 1983
- Running time: 100 minutes
- Country: United States
- Language: English

Seeing Red is a 1983 American documentary film directed by Jim Klein and Julia Reichert.

== Synopsis ==
The documentary film looks at the political activities and activism of Americans who were members or supporters of the American Communist Party. It is one of the first non-fiction films to examine the role of a third political party in the United States.

== Reception ==
In a mixed review, Dan Georgakas wrote in Cineaste that "given the failure of the interviewees to seize the opportunity offered by the filmmakers, seeing Red is unable to penetrate new ideological terrain or reconcile the radical generations. Nevertheless, the film provides a vivid sense of the public life of rank and file Communists of the 1930s and 1940s." In a negative review for The Nation, Joshua Freeman stated that "the effort is admirable but the results are disappointing. Neither the audience nor those interviewed are given their full due."

== Accolades ==
It was nominated for an Academy Award for Best Documentary Feature.
