= Union Maids =

1976 film

- Directed by: Jim Klein; Miles Mogulescu; Julia Reichert
- Produced by: Jim Klein; Miles Mogulescu; Julia Reichert
- Cinematography: Tony Heriza; Sherry Novick
- Edited by: Jim Klein; Julia Reichert
- Distributed by: New Day Films
- Release date: February 4, 1976
- Running time: 50 minutes
- Country: United States
- Language: English

Union Maids is a 1976 American documentary film directed by Jim Klein, Julia Reichert and Miles Mogulescu. The film was based on the three women from Chicago in the labor history book Rank and File by Staughton Lynd and Alice Lynd.

== Cast ==
- Kate Hyndman
- Stella Nowicki
- Sylvia Woods

== Production ==
Like many of her other films, Julia Reichert used a collaborative, nonhierarchical model of filmmaking during the production of Union Maids. She and James Klein shot the documentary on video rather than film. This allowed them longer interviews with their subjects, which, also, allowed the three women to better shape their interviews, and thus their contributions to and representation in the film. Also, shooting on video allowed Reichert and Klein to use student cinematographers, as they could watch the video live and give real-time direction without wasting expensive film stock.

Archival footage of said workers organizing and music of the labor movement were also used.

== Accolades ==
It was nominated for an Academy Award for Best Documentary Feature.

== Legacy ==
In 2022, the film was selected for preservation in the United States National Film Registry by the Library of Congress as being "culturally, historically, or aesthetically significant".
