= White Earth, North Dakota =

- City
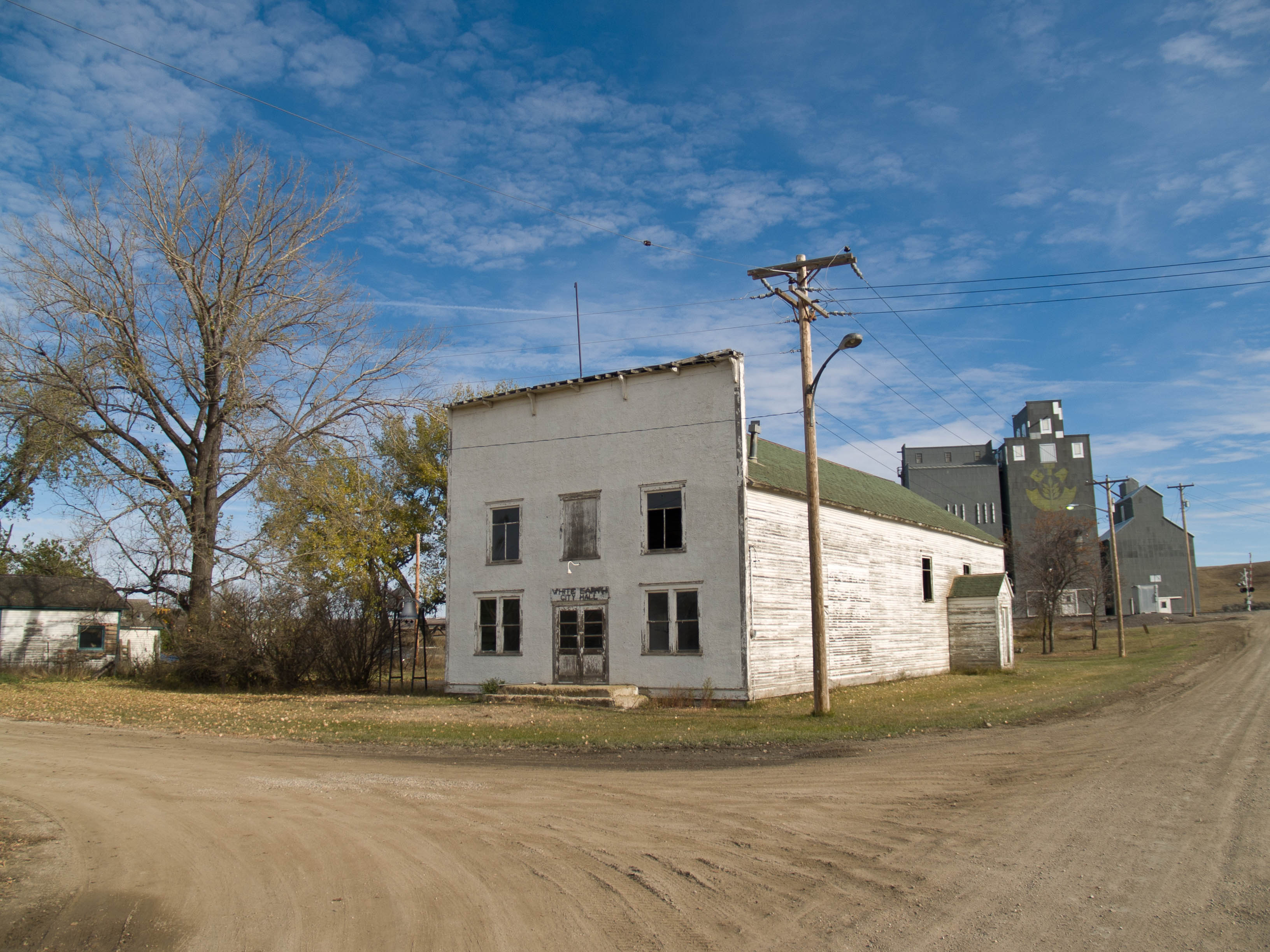
- Street in White Earth

- Location in Mountrail County and the state of North Dakota
- Coordinates: 48°22′48″N 102°46′18″W
- Country: United States
- State: North Dakota
- County: Mountrail
- Founded: 1887

Area
  - Total: 1.50 sq mi (3.88 km^{2})
  - Land: 1.50 sq mi (3.88 km^{2})
  - Water: 0 sq mi (0.00 km^{2})
- Elevation: 2,093 ft (638 m)

Population (2020)
  - Total: 100
  - Estimate (2022): 93
  - Density: 66.8/sq mi (25.78/km^{2})
- Time zone: UTC-6 (Central (CST))
  - Summer (DST): UTC-5 (CDT)
- ZIP code: 58794
- Area code: 701
- FIPS code: 38-85540
- GNIS feature ID: 1036333

White Earth is a city in Mountrail County, North Dakota, United States. It is one of the oldest communities in Mountrail County, having been founded in 1887. The population was 100 at the 2020 census.

The community's recent growth due to the North Dakota oil boom is the subject of an Academy Award–nominated short documentary film, White Earth.

== Geography ==
According to the United States Census Bureau, the city has a total area of 1.50 square miles (3.88 km^{2}), all land.

== Demographics ==
Historical population
Census	Pop.	Note	%±
1910	264		—
1920	247		−6.4%
1930	240		−2.8%
1940	272		13.3%
1950	218		−19.9%
1960	208		−4.6%
1970	128		−38.5%
1980	98		−23.4%
1990	73		−25.5%
2000	63		−13.7%
2010	80		27.0%
2020	100		25.0%
2022 (est.)	93		−7.0%
U.S. Decennial Census; 2020 Census

=== 2020 census ===
As of the census of 2020, there were 100 people and 23 households in the city.

=== 2010 census ===
As of the census of 2010, there were 80 people, 26 households, and 20 families residing in the city. The population density was 53.3 inhabitants per square mile (20.6/km^{2}). There were 37 housing units at an average density of 24.7 per square mile (9.5/km^{2}). The racial makeup of the city was 97.5% White and 2.5% African American. Hispanic or Latino of any race were 5.0% of the population.

There were 26 households, of which 42.3% had children under the age of 18 living with them, 61.5% were married couples living together, 3.8% had a female householder with no husband present, 11.5% had a male householder with no wife present, and 23.1% were non-families. Of all households 23.1% were made up of individuals. The average household size was 3.08 and the average family size was 3.70.

The median age in the city was 31.7 years. 40% of residents were under the age of 18; 2.6% were between the ages of 18 and 24; 27.6% were from 25 to 44; 26.3% were from 45 to 64; and 3.8% were 65 years of age or older. The gender makeup of the city was 57.5% male and 42.5% female.

=== 2000 census ===
As of the census of 2000, there were 63 people, 24 households, and 16 families residing in the city. The population density was 42.1 inhabitants per square mile (16.3/km^{2}). There were 27 housing units at an average density of 18.0 per square mile (6.9/km^{2}). The racial makeup of the city was 93.65% White, and 6.35% from two or more races.

There were 24 households, out of which 45.8% had children under the age of 18 living with them, 58.3% were married couples living together, 4.2% had a female householder with no husband present, and 33.3% were non-families. Of all households 29.2% were made up of individuals, and 20.8% had someone living alone who was 65 years of age or older. The average household size was 2.63 and the average family size was 3.31.

In the city, the population was spread out, with 33.3% under the age of 18, 6.3% from 18 to 24, 25.4% from 25 to 44, 25.4% from 45 to 64, and 9.5% who were 65 years of age or older. The median age was 31 years. For every 100 females, there were 90.9 males. For every 100 females age 18 and over, there were 90.9 males.

The median income for a household in the city was $26,250, and the median income for a family was $30,000. Males had a median income of $28,750 versus $18,750 for females. The per capita income for the city was $11,671. There were 10.0% of families and 22.2% of the population living below the poverty line, including 60.0% of under eighteens and none of those over 64.

== Transportation ==
Amtrak's Empire Builder, which operates between Seattle/Portland and Chicago, passes through the town on BNSF tracks, but makes no stop. The nearest station is located in Stanley, 22 miles (35 km) to the east.

== Education ==
White Earth is serviced by the Tioga School District.

== Climate ==
This climatic region is typified by large seasonal temperature differences, with warm to hot (and often humid) summers and cold (sometimes severely cold) winters. According to the Köppen Climate Classification system, White Earth has a humid continental climate, abbreviated "Dfb" on climate maps.
