= White Earth (film) =

- Film poster
- Directed by: J. Christian Jensen
- Written by: J. Christian Jensen
- Distributed by: New Day Films (non-theatrical)
- Release date: January 2014 (Slamdance)
- Running time: 20 minutes
- Country: United States
- Language: English

White Earth is a 2014 documentary film by J. Christian Jensen about new arrivals in White Earth, North Dakota who have moved there to seek work in the North Dakota oil boom. The film explores life in the oil boom through the eyes of four children and an immigrant mother. White Earth was nominated for the Academy Award for Best Documentary (Short Subject) at the 87th Academy Awards.

== Awards and nominations ==
Awards
Award	Date of ceremony	Category	Recipients and nominees	Result
Academy Award	February 22, 2015	Best Short Subject Documentary	J. Christian Jensen	Nominated
