= New Day Films =

New Day Films is a U.S. film distribution cooperative that primarily serves the non-theatrical market (colleges and universities, libraries, high schools, and community groups). Its filmmaker members come from across the US. The cooperative is member owned, with the members doing most of the technical, marketing and administrative work. New Day has a central office for customer service and administrative support in Newburgh, New York.

== History ==
New Day Films was founded in 1971 by four feminist filmmakers: Liane Brandon, James Klein, Julia Reichert, and Amalie R. Rothschild. New Day has continually operated as a cooperative, consisting of more than 100 filmmaker members and a management team elected from the membership.

== Films ==
New Day's titles fall into such categories as Multiculturalism and Diversity; Social and Political History; Gender and Socialization; Media, Art, and Culture; Physical and Mental Health; Parenting and Family; and Global Concerns.

The company's films have been broadcast on P.O.V., Independent Lens, HBO, and other national programs. New Day titles include Academy Award for Best Documentary Short Film winners, Academy Award for Best Documentary Short or Best Documentary Feature nominees, and numerous other winning and nominated films for the Emmys and other awards.

=== New Day Academy Awards for Best Documentary Short Film ===
- Deadly Deception: General Electric, Nuclear Weapons and Our Environment (1992) directed by Debra Chasnoff
- Witness to War: Dr. Charlie Clements (1986) directed by Deborah Shaffer.

=== New Day Academy Award-nominated films for Best Documentary Short or Feature ===
- White Earth (2015) directed by J. Christian Jensen, nominated, Best Documentary Short
- Sun Come Up (2011) directed by Jennifer Redfern, nominated Best Documentary Short
- The Most Dangerous Man in America: Daniel Ellsberg and the Pentagon Papers (2010) directed by Judith Ehrlich and Rick Goldsmith, nominated, Best Documentary Feature
- The Collector of Bedford Street (2003) directed by Alice Elliot, nominated, Best Documentary Short
- Seeing Red (1984), directed by Jim Klein and Julia Reichert, nominated, Best Documentary Feature
- Union Maids (1978), directed by Jim Klein and Julia Reichert, nominated, Best Documentary Feature
