= Fuyao Group =

Chinese automotive glass manufacturer

Fuyao Glass Industry Group Co., Ltd.
- Type: Public
- Traded as: SSE: 600660 (A shares); SEHK: 3606 (H shares); CSI A50
- Industry: Glass production
- Founded: 1987; 39 years ago
- Founder: Cao Dewang
- Headquarters: Fuqing, China
- Area served: Worldwide
- Key people: Cao Dewang (Chairman)
- Revenue: CN¥21.1 billion (2019)
- Number of employees: 26,000
- Website: www.fuyaogroup.com

Fuyao Group
- Traditional Chinese: 福耀集團
- Simplified Chinese: 福耀集团
Transcriptions
Standard Mandarin
- Hanyu Pinyin: Fúyào Jítuán

Fuyao Glass Industry Group Co., Ltd. (Chinese: 福耀玻璃工业集团股份有限公司) is a Chinese glass manufacturing company established in 1987 and is headquartered in Fuqing, Fujian, China. It is one of the largest automotive glass producers in the world, with customers including large international automobile manufacturers such as Ford, General Motors, Subaru, Tesla and Volkswagen. The company also produces float glass and construction glass. First established as a joint venture company, it was listed on the Shanghai Stock Exchange in 1993 and on the Hong Kong Stock Exchange in 2015.

== History ==
Cao Dewang founded Fuyao in Fuqing, Fujian Province in 1987 with several business partners. He had previous experience having taken over management of a glass factory owned by a local government. While there were few major buyers of automobiles at first, his company targeted the market of replacement glass for large numbers of imported vehicles into China. The name derives from the first character in the name of the city of Fuqing (福 fú) and the Chinese word meaning "shine" (耀 yào).

The company formed a joint venture with Saint-Gobain in 1996 with the French firm's 51 percent stake valued at $15.3 million. Three years later, Cao bought the stake back for $30 million.

Fuyao became an original equipment manufacturer to General Motors in June 2006. Later that year, it signed an agreement with Goldman Sachs to sell 111 million new shares, to raise about ¥890 million ($137 million). In March 2007, Fuyao landed a contract supplying Bentley. That year, foreign sales contributed ¥5.17 billion, or almost $795 million, almost 28 percent of its sales that year. By that time, it was the fifth-largest maker of automotive glass in the world, with an estimated three percent market share, and held 60 percent market share of the automotive glass market in China.

In 2021, BASF and Fuyao Glass Industry Group entered into a strategic cooperation agreement for the production of high-quality sealed glass for the automotive industry as well as development in the ESG sector. BASF provides technical solutions and development expertise, Fuyao Group provides support.

In 2023 (first three quarters), revenue of RMB 23.8bn (up 16.6%) and net profit of RMB 4.1bn (up 5.9%). Total assets of ¥56.5bn and total liabilities of ¥26.5bn.

=== Fuyao Glass America Inc. ===
In 2014, Fuyao began looking at establishing a factory presence in the United States, considering several sites in Ohio and Michigan before deciding on the former General Motors Moraine Assembly plant in Moraine, Ohio. Its initial commitment to the factory, which was made public in January 2014, was to buy 1.4 million square feet of the plant from Industrial Realty Group and invest $240 million into an auto glass production facility, which would create 800 jobs. In 2014, the company bought a float glass plant in Mount Zion, Illinois. In 2016, it announced an additional $131 million investment to add additional after-market glass lines at the plant, bringing it to 24 production lines. In exchange it received $6.6 million in incentives from JobsOhio. By then, the company planned to produce enough auto glass for 4 million to 5 million automobiles a year, taking advantage of the recent contraction in the U.S. auto market during the Great Recession. By the time the plant entered full-scale production in October 2016, it had invested $1 billion in the U.S. subsidiary. It has long-term plans to grow to 5,000 employees in the United States. As of early 2020, Fuyao had opened additional operating facilities in Greenville, South Carolina and Detroit, Michigan. In March 2026, the plant in Moraine Ohio caught on fire. Firefighters worked for 56 hours to put out the massive fire.

==== Worker relations ====
The plant saw some obstacles during the first two years of operation within the United States, including concerns about safety, inability to turn a profit, and politicizing employee concerns regarding the unionization of the Moraine Assembly plant's labor force. Conflicts arose from clashes in cultural norms and customs between the Chinese and American employees within the Moraine assembly.

Shortly after the Moraine Assembly opened, it was cited by the Occupational Safety and Health Administration (OSHA) for several critical safety violations, including the failure to provide protective equipment, the lack of HAZMAT training, and the failure to properly cover moving machinery. The infractions violated the Occupational Safety and Health Act (United States) of 1970, which prevents employers from knowingly exposing employees to hazardous work conditions. OSHA cited Fuyao for thirteen safety violations and fined it approximately $725,000. Subsequently, Fuyao invested $7 million in safety features throughout the Moraine Assembly plant. Fuyao also formed an environmental safety team within the Moraine assembly to provide in-depth training to the plant employees in both English and Mandarin Chinese.

Since the majority of the labor force at Fuyao Glass America's Moraine Assembly plant had previously worked at the General Motors Moraine Assembly that was located on the same property, many workers wished to reform their connections with a major American labor union. A large portion of the plant's workforce organized and launched a campaign to form a union through the United Auto Workers, but company management promoted anti-union policies, hired anti-union organization contractors LRI to dissuade voters, and threatened union organizers with termination. In 2017 a union vote was held and anti-unionists defeated pro-unionists by 886 to 441 votes.

Following management's victory, several prominent employees in favour of trade unions and plant executives faced workplace repercussions ranging from losses in working hours to termination. Three pro-union employees, who had been terminated for reasons considered questionable by American cultural workplace standards, filed cases with the National Labor Relations Board (NLRB) against the company, which settled the case in 2018 by agreeing to cover back pay and interest totaling $120,000. The settlement referenced the cases of four former employees, with allegations that included terminating workers, interrogating, harassing, and disciplining employees, refusing to hire employees with prior union ties, and constant changing of the company's terms and conditions of employment.

In 2016, Fuyao Glass America President John Gauthier and Vice President Dave Burrows were terminated, with Fuyao's executive management citing the need to improve company efficiency. Burrows and Gauthier filed suit with the Equal Employment Opportunity Commission, alleging that both executives were removed of both contract and employment without cause, prior notice, or explanation. The suit also alleged that national origin was a defining factor that Fuyao considered when firing both corporate executives. In 2020, Burrows was replaced by Sunny Yiqun Sun, a Chinese national.

In January 2019, American Factory premiered at the Sundance Film Festival, featuring themes of cultural conflict, production challenges and management opposition to unionization. The film won the Academy Award for best documentary. Critic Eric Kohn described it as "a fascinating tragicomedy about the incompatibility of American and Chinese industries".

==== 2024 federal search warrant ====
On 26 July 2024, federal agents from the Immigration and Customs Enforcement - Homeland Security Investigations (HSI), Internal Revenue Service, Criminal Investigation (IRS-CI), and Federal Bureau of Investigation (FBI) conducted a raid on Fuyao Glass America's operations in Moraine, Ohio and 27 nearby locations to investigate "financial crimes and labor exploitation".

Fuyao Glass America released the following statement related to the raid:

"Last Friday, July 26th, 2024, federal government agents and supporting local law enforcement officers visited Fuyao Glass America, Inc. ("FGA") as part of an investigation which we believe involves certain contractor and its entities. While we believe FGA is not the target of this investigation, the Company intends to cooperate fully with the investigation.

As a result, part of our first shift and the second shift operations were suspended. FGA has resumed production in the third shift on the same day and we believe our production and delivery will not be impacted."

Fuyao Group, in a filing with the Shanghai Stock Exchange, claims federal authorities told them they were not the target of the investigation, adding it's centered on "a third-party labor service company."
