= Steven Bognar =

Filmmaker

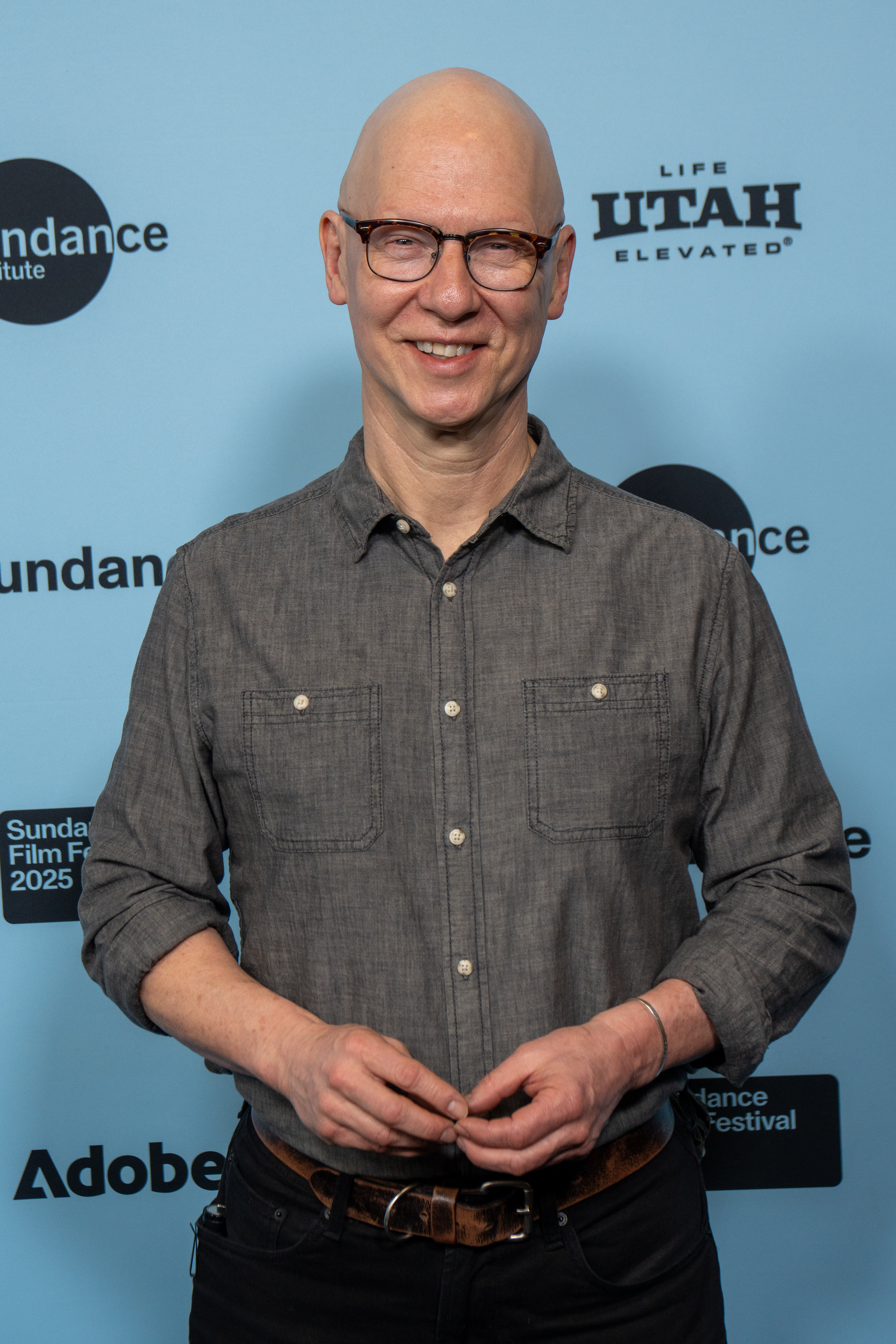
- Bognar at the 2025 Sundance Film Festival
- Born: 1963 (age 62–63); Milwaukee, Wisconsin, U.S.
- Occupations: Documentary filmmaker; director; producer; media arts instructor
- Years active: 1990–present
- Notable work: American Factory (2019); A Lion in the House (2006); The Last Truck: Closing of a GM Plant (2009)
- Partner: Julia Reichert (until her death in 2022)
- Awards: Academy Award for Best Documentary Feature (2020); Emmy Award for Outstanding Directing for a Documentary/Nonfiction Program (2020); Directors Guild of America Award for Documentary (2020); Sundance U.S. Documentary Directing Award (2019)

Steven Bognar (born 1963) is an American film director.

An Oscar-winning and award-winning documentary filmmaker, his films have been screened at SXSW, Sundance, and the Ann Arbor Film Festival. Bognar has also worked as an instructor of media arts, teaching at public schools across his home state of Ohio, as well as at Antioch College. He was a frequent collaborator of filmmaker Julia Reichert.

== Career ==
In January 2020, Bognar and Reichert won the Directors Guild of America Award for Documentary for American Factory.

In 2026, Bognar served as an executive producer on Who Moves America directed by Yael Bridge, which focuses on United Parcel Service workers.

== Style ==
Bognar has developed a documentary filmmaking style that centralizes the Midwestern region of the United States, with significance placed on incorporating photographic imagery.

== Filmography ==
- Welcome to Censornati (1990)
- Personal Belongings (1996)
- Waiting for Marty (1999)
- Picture Day (2000)
- Gravel (2006)
- A Lion in the House (2006, with Julia Reichert)
- The Last Truck: Closing of a GM Plant (2009, with Reichert)
- Sparkle (2012, with Reichert)
- Making Morning Star (2015, with Reichert)
- American Factory (2019, with Reichert)
- 9to5: The Story of a Movement (2020, with Reichert)
- 8:46 (2020, with Reichert)
- Dave Chappelle: Live in Real Life (2021, with Reichert)
