= Julia Reichert =

American filmmaker and activist (1946–2022)

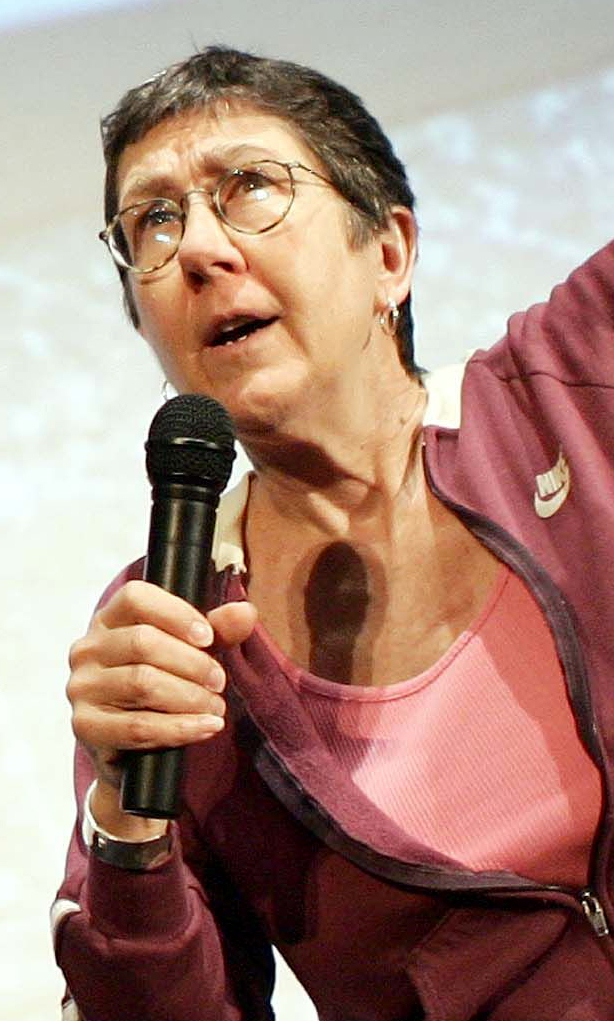
- Born: June 16, 1946; Princeton, New Jersey, U.S.
- Died: December 1, 2022 (aged 76); Yellow Springs, Ohio, U.S.
- Education: Antioch College
- Occupation: Documentary filmmaker
- Years active: 1968–2021
- Known for: Union Maids, Growing Up Female, American Factory, The Last Truck: Closing of a GM Plant, Seeing Red
- Spouses: Jim Klein (div. 1986); Steven Bognar (m. 2020)
- Children: 1
- Relatives: Jeff Reichert (nephew)

Julia Bell Reichert (June 16, 1946 – December 1, 2022) was an American Academy Award-winning documentary filmmaker, activist, and feminist. She was a co-founder of New Day Films. Reichert's filmmaking career spanned over 50 years as a director and producer of documentaries.

Reichert was a four-time Academy Award-nominated director, for Union Maids (1977), Seeing Red: Stories of American Communists (1984), The Last Truck: Closing of a GM Plant (2010) and American Factory (2020, for which she won an Oscar).

She was a two-time winner of the Primetime Emmy, a two-time nominee of the Peabody Award, and director of two films on the National Film Registry.

Reichert was the recipient of the award for Distinguished Service to Labor and Working-Class History from the Labor and Working-Class History Association (LAWCHA). She was professor emeritus in the Department of Theatre, Dance and Motion Pictures at Wright State University.

Reichert was honored with lifetime achievement awards from the International Documentary Association, the Full Frame Documentary Film Festival, and the Hot Docs Film Festival. She is a recipient of the Chicken & Egg Pictures 'Breakthrough Prize.' A traveling retrospective of her work was curated by the Wexner Center for the Arts, and was launched at the Museum of Modern Art in May 2019, before traveling to other US cities.

== Early life ==
Julia Bell Reichert was born on June 16, 1946, in Princeton, New Jersey, and was brought up in nearby Bordentown Township, New Jersey. Her father Louis was a butcher and her mother Dorothy was a nurse. Reichert was one of four children. The family spent summers on Long Beach Island, NJ, where her father ran a fishing charter business. Reichert had a youthful fascination with photography.

Reichert was a 1964 graduate of Bordentown Regional High School.

She enrolled at Antioch College in 1964, and dropped out in 1967 when she hitchhiked to California during the Summer of Love. She returned to Antioch in 1968 and graduated in 1970 with a degree in documentary arts.

During her Antioch years, Reichert's sole film professor was experimental filmmaker David Brooks, who died at age 24 driving between Antioch and his home in South Charleston, Ohio.

== Career ==
=== 1968–1970: WYSO FM ===
In 1968, Reichert became partners in life and creative work with Jim Klein, who introduced her in 1969 to the Antioch student radio station, WYSO FM. Reichert began to learn audio recording, tape editing, interviewing, and storytelling within a time frame. She worked an Antioch co-op job at WYSO in the Summer of 1969, and in her course evaluation, WYSO manager Tim Mabee wrote: "Julia developed practically on her own initiative the WYSO news program. She trained and directed about ten students and several outsiders in the writing, compiling, taping, interviewing, and announcing involved."

In 1969, Reichert created and hosted "The Single Girl" on WYSO, possibly the first openly feminist radio program in the United States. Reichert later retitled the show "Sisters, Brothers, Lovers, Listen," feeling the word 'girl' was disrespectful.

=== 1970–1972: Growing Up Female and the creation of New Day Films ===
Produced in 1970 and released in 1971, Growing Up Female chronicles the socialization of women at six different ages, blending interview and cinema verité material. The film is the first feature documentary of the modern Women's Liberation Movement and was selected by the Library of Congress for the National Film Registry in 2011. The film was directed and produced by Reichert and Jim Klein.

Frustrated with unfair distribution offers for Growing Up Female, Reichert and Klein decided to distribute the film themselves. They coined the name New Day Films. While attending the Flaherty Seminar in 1971, they met filmmaker Amalie R. Rothschild, who also had a feminist film, It Happens to Us, and soon thereafter Liane Brandon, director of Anything You Want to Be, also a pioneering feminist documentary. The four filmmakers founded New Day Films as a filmmaker-owned democratically run film distribution cooperative. New Day Films recently celebrated its 50th anniversary, and now has over 140 filmmaker-owners, distributing over 300 films.

=== 1974–1984: Union Maids and Seeing Red: Stories of American Communists ===
Reichert and Klein's collaboration continued with Methadone – An American Way of Dealing, released in 1974, and then turned towards history, teaming up with Miles Mogulescu to make Union Maids.

Inspired by the book "Rank & File – Personal Histories By Working Class Organizers" by Alice & Staughton Lynd, the film is a pioneering oral history/archival documentary telling the rank-and-file story of three union activists. Union Maids premiered in 1976, was nominated for an Academy Award for Best Documentary Feature in 1977 and has been in active distribution ever since. Historian Howard Zinn called Union Maids "the best film on labor history I have ever seen."

Seeing Red: Stories of American Communists, produced & directed by Reichert & Klein in the late 1970s and early 1980s, premiered at the Telluride and New York Film Festivals in 1983. It had a successful theatrical run, playing for ten weeks in New York and San Francisco/Bay Area, 7 weeks in Boston & Seattle, and 5 weeks in Los Angeles. The film screened theatrically in nearly 100 US cities and was nominated in 1984 for an Academy Award for Best Documentary Feature. Seeing Red remains in active distribution, and was recently restored by IndieCollect for new theatrical screenings.

=== 1985–1996: From documentary to narrative and back again ===
After Seeing Red, Reichert wrote, produced, and directed the independent fiction feature Emma & Elvis (1992) and produced the independent fiction feature The Dream Catcher (1999), directed by Ed Radtke. In 1997 she teamed up with her new partner Steven Bognar to begin filming the stories of children fighting cancer at Cincinnati Children's Hospital Medical Center, in a film that would become A Lion in the House.

Edited from over 525 hours of material filmed across six years and produced in partnership with ITVS, A Lion in the House tells the stories of five children and teenagers, their parents, siblings, and caregivers as they struggle to navigate childhood cancer and all its challenges. The film, a co-production with ITVS, the Independent Television Service, premiered as a two-night primetime common-carriage PBS special on the series Independent Lens. The film, executive produced by Sally Jo Fifer, premiered at the 2006 Sundance Film Festival in the U.S. Documentary Competition, was nominated for Best Documentary Feature in the Film Independent Spirit Awards, and won the Primetime Emmy for 'Exceptional Merit in Nonfiction Filmmaking' in 2007.

=== 2008-2015: The Last Truck: Closing of a GM Plant ===
In June 2008, following the announcement that Dayton's General Motors would be shuttering their Moraine Assembly Truck and Bus plant - a major employer and financial lifeblood of the community - Reichert and Bognar began production on what would become The Last Truck: Closing of a GM Plant. The duo and their team interviewed hundreds of the plant's 3,000-plus workers. Denied access to film inside the plant, they interviewed workers at the entrance and exits to the plant's property, and supplied digital cameras to workers to covertly film, including footage of the last vehicles to be assembled there. The film is a production of HBO Documentary Films, executive produced by Lisa Heller & Sheila Nevins. The film premiered at the 2009 Telluride Film Festival and was nominated in 2010 for an Academy Award for Best Documentary (Short Subject).

In 2012, Reichert and Bognar produced and directed the short documentary Sparkle, which followed legendary Dayton Contemporary Dance Company (DCDC) dancer Sheri Sparkle' Williams following what could have been a career-ending injury. The film, executive produced by Gita Pullapilly and Aron Gaudet, won the "Best Documentary Short" audience awards at the AFI SilverDocs and New Orleans Film Festivals. The film was broadcast on the PBS special LIFECASTERS.

In 2012, Julia Reichert returned to her roots, beginning a two-year collaboration with WYSO 91.3 FM, where she learned many aspects of nonfiction storytelling in the 1960s and 70s. Reichert and Bognar teamed with WYSO staff and volunteers to create ReInvention Stories (2012–14). A project of the national storytelling initiative Localore and in collaboration with web innovators Zeega, ReInvention Stories is a documentary project telling stories of Daytonians forced to reinvent their lives and professions in the wake of the 2008 economic crash. The stories came in the form of WYSO radio pieces, short films, a photography exhibit, and an interactive transmedia website. The project was supported by the Corporation for Public Broadcasting and the John D. and Catherine T. MacArthur Foundation, among others. ReInvention Stories was featured in the interactive media section of the 2014 Tribeca Film Festival.

In 2015, Reichert and Bognar collaborated with the Cincinnati Opera and the University of Cincinnati's College Conservatory of Music to create the documentary short Making Morning Star, a behind-the-scenes look at the workshopping and development of a new American opera by composer Ricky Ian Gordon and librettist William M. Hoffman.

=== 2015-2020: American Factory ===
In 2015, it was announced that the former General Motors plant in Moraine would be occupied by Chinese windshield manufacturer Fuyao, injecting a wave of new jobs back into the community. Reichert and Bognar were granted access to both the Ohio and China factories, as well as access to the company's chairman; they filmed from 2015 to 2017. Her nephew Jeff Reichert & Julie Parker Benello became producers on the film, and Jeff Reichert became one of the film's primary cinematographers, along with Erick Stoll, Aubrey Keith, Julia Reichert & Steven Bognar. The film became a production of Participant Media in late 2016, and Diane Weyermann and Jeff Skoll became Executive Producers.

The film's editor Lindsay Utz completed editing in late 2018, and composer Chad Cannon completed his original score in early 2019. American Factory premiered at the Sundance Film Festival in 2019, where it won the award for Best Director, U.S. Documentary. Shortly after its premiere, the film was acquired by Netflix and Higher Ground Productions. Following a successful film festival tour, it was nominated for and won the Academy Award for Best Documentary Feature.

Following the premiere of American Factory, a traveling retrospective of Julia Reichert's films was curated by the Wexner Center for the Arts and was launched at the Museum of Modern Art in May 2019, before traveling to other US cities.

=== 2020-2021: 9to5: The Story of a Movement ===
Long in production, Reichert and Bognar completed their film 9to5: The Story of a Movement, a real-life activist movement that inspired Jane Fonda to produce the feature narrative film 9 to 5. The film was scheduled to premiere at the 2020 South by Southwest Film Festival until the pandemic shut down the entire festival. The film was screened at the AFI Docs, Mill Valley, and DOC NYC film festivals.

The film features interviews with many of 9to5's members as well as actor and activist Jane Fonda. The film premiered on PBS on their Independent Lens series in early 2021 and was nominated for a Peabody Award in 2022.

During the height of the pandemic, Reichert & Bognar were approached by a neighbor, comedian Dave Chappelle, to film a series of distanced, outdoor comedy performances Chappelle held in their town of Yellow Springs, Ohio.

Following a full Summer of performances, which included special guests such as Jon Stewart, Tiffany Haddish, and Chris Rock, Bognar and Reichert produced and directed two films - 8:46, which premiered online via Netflix in 2020, and Dave Chappelle: Live in Real Life, which closed the 2021 Tribeca Film Festival to a sold-out audience of over 6,000 at Radio City Music Hall.

== Themes and views ==
In a 2019 WYSO interview with Neenah Ellis, Julia Reichert said "I think all of us are shaped by our era that we grow up in. I came of age in the 60s. Millions of us saw racism, saw U.S. domination around the world, imperialism, saw huge inequalities class-wise, and we said "The system's not working. We got to replace it. And we became, in some broad sense, revolutionaries. How do we live the life we can foresee that we'd like to have? How do we do that? Particularly when it comes to racism and class, sexism, and patriarchy. This doesn't just go to the government and the board room, it goes to the bedroom and the kitchen, right? It goes to how we treat each other? So I think there was a general sense, which was very exciting, that we can build a new world."

Reichart's films focused on the lives of working-class people and women. Her five feature documentaries about labor struggles, Union Maids, Seeing Red, The Last Truck, American Factory and 9to5 - The Story of a Movement, center on collective actions, with particular attention to nuances of class, race, and gender. Reichert, with collaborators Klein and Bognar, avoids singling out one "heroic individual" in her films, believing as she does that it takes collective action and solidarity to make social change.

Reichert has worked in both an oral history documentary tradition, blending in-depth interviews with archival footage (Union Maids, Seeing Red, 9to5 - The Story of a Movement) and in a cinema verité tradition following action as it unfolds (A Lion in the House, The Last Truck, American Factory).

In her 2020 Academy Award acceptance speech, Julia Reichert said "Working people have it harder and harder these days. But we believe things will get better when workers of the world unite."

== Service & Community ==
After Antioch College, Reichert, Klein, and other young filmmakers and media activists formed a collective home and workplace in Dayton, Ohio, which they called "The Media House." Located in the Dayton View neighborhood, the home served as a hub for social issue media creation, including the community documentary series "Summer Lights."

Reichert taught film for 28 years in the Department of Theatre, Dance, and Motion Pictures at Wright State University, in Dayton Ohio. Her former students include Hannah Beachler, Karri O'Reilly, Nicole Reigel, Sherman Payne, and Erik Bork.

Reichert also taught courses at Antioch College and American University and has been a guest lecturer at Harvard and Yale Universities.

In 2015, Reichert co-founded Indie Caucus, a national group of independent filmmakers committed to pushing PBS to support independent, diverse public media and documentary work, especially on the two flagship documentary programs, INDEPENDENT LENS and P.O.V.

Julia Reichert has served as a mentor and inspiration to dozens of contemporary documentary filmmakers. In a 2022 interview with Filmmaker Magazine, filmmaker Leilah Weinraub (Shakedown) said "When I was in my 20s I worked for Steve Bognar and Julia Reichert, whose filmmaking I'm still very inspired by."

== Personal life ==
Reichert had one child, a daughter, with Jim Klein, to whom she was married until their divorce in 1986. She married longtime partner Steven Bognar in 2020. She was also a member of the Democratic Socialists of America.

Reichert was diagnosed with non-Hodgkin lymphoma in 2006, and with urothelial cancer in 2018. She died from urothelial cancer at her home in Yellow Springs, Ohio, on December 1, 2022, at the age of 76.

== Filmography ==
- Growing Up Female (1971)
- Methadone: An American Way of Dealing (1975, with James Klein)
- Union Maids (1976, with Klein)
- Seeing Red: Stories of American Communists (1983, with Klein)
- Emma and Elvis (1992)
- The Dream Catcher (1999, producer)
- A Lion in the House (2006, with Steven Bognar)
- The Last Truck: Closing of a GM Plant (2009, with Bognar)
- Sparkle (2012, with Bognar)
- Making Morning Star (2015, with Bognar)
- American Factory (2019, with Bognar)
- 9to5: The Story of a Movement (2020, with Bognar)
- 8:46 (2020, with Bognar)
- Dave Chappelle: Live in Real Life (2021, with Bognar)
- Julia's Stepping Stones (2024, with Bognar, autobiography released posthumously)

== Select awards and honors ==
- 1984: American Film Festival's Blue Ribbon Award for Documentary (for Seeing Red)
- 2007: Primetime Emmy for Exceptional Merit in Nonfiction Filmmaking (for A Lion in the House)
- 2011: National Film Registry preservation selection for Growing Up Female (1971)
- 2017: Chicken & Egg Pictures Breakthrough Prize
- 2018: International Documentary Association - Career Achievement Award
- 2019: Sundance Film Festival Directory Award for Documentary (for American Factory)
- 2019: Critics' Choice Documentary Award for Best Director (for American Factory)
- 2019: Gotham Independent Film Award for Best Documentary (for American Factory)
- 2019: Hot Docs Canadian International Documentary Festival - Outstanding Achievement Award
- 2019: DOC NYC - The Robert and Anne Drew Award for Documentary Excellence
- 2019: International Documentary Association - IDA Award for Best Director (for American Factory)
- 2020: Cinema Eye Honors Award for Outstanding Achievement in Nonfiction Feature Filmmaking (for American Factory)
- 2020: Directors Guild of America, USA award for Outstanding Directorial Achievement in Documentary (for American Factory)
- 2020: Film Independent Spirit Award for Best Documentary (for American Factory)
- 2020: Academy Award for Best Documentary Feature (for American Factory)
- 2020: Primetime Emmy for Outstanding Directing for a Documentary/Nonfiction Program (for American Factory)
- 2021: Labor and Working-Class History from the Labor and Working-Class History Association award for Distinguished Service to Labor and Working-Class History
- 2022: National Film Registry preservation selection for Union Maids
