= American Factory =

2019 documentary film by Steven Bognar and Julia Reichert

- Film poster
- Traditional Chinese: 美國工廠
- Simplified Chinese: 美国工厂
- Hanyu Pinyin: Měiguó Gōngchǎng
- Directed by: Steven Bognar; Julia Reichert
- Produced by: Steven Bognar; Julia Reichert; Jeff Reichert; Julie Parker Benello
- Cinematography: Steven Bognar; Aubrey Keith; Jeff Reichert; Julia Reichert; Erick Stoll
- Edited by: Lindsay Utz
- Music by: Chad Cannon
- Production companies: Higher Ground Productions; Participant Media
- Distributed by: Netflix
- Release dates: January 25, 2019 (Sundance); August 21, 2019 (United States)
- Running time: 110 minutes
- Country: United States
- Languages: English; Mandarin

American Factory (Chinese: 美国工厂) is a 2019 American documentary film directed by Steven Bognar and Julia Reichert, about Chinese company Fuyao's factory in Moraine, a city near Dayton, Ohio, that occupies Moraine Assembly, a shuttered General Motors plant. The film had its festival premiere at the 2019 Sundance Film Festival. It is distributed by Netflix, and is the first film acquired by Barack and Michelle Obama's production company, Higher Ground Productions. At the 92nd Academy Awards, American Factory won the award for Best Documentary Feature.

== Synopsis ==
In post-industrial Ohio, a Chinese billionaire opens a factory in an abandoned General Motors plant, hiring two thousand Americans. Early days of hope and optimism give way to setbacks as high-tech China clashes with working-class America.

== Production ==
Filmed between February 2015 and the end of 2017, Reichert and Bognar were granted filming access by Fuyao at both their Ohio and Chinese plant locations. They were inspired to make this film as the events they aimed to depict were taking place in the same Moraine Assembly plant once occupied by General Motors, which was the central topic of their 2009 Oscar-nominated documentary short The Last Truck: Closing of a GM Plant.

The Mandarin Chinese language portions of the film were facilitated by the inclusion of two Chinese filmmakers, Yiqian Zhang and Mijie Li, one or both of whom would travel to Ohio monthly. The directors credit these two as essential in providing a connection to the Chinese subjects depicted in the film.

=== Style ===
The filmmakers implemented a fly-on-the-wall documentary filmmaking approach, in which no dialogue external to the subjects of the film is included, and the sounds of the factory and the dialogue of the workers is prioritized. Lavalier microphones were employed to effectively balance worker dialogue amid noise emanating from the factory machinery. The voice-over narration provided by the factory workers was often recorded at their respective homes, independently from the factory setting. According to Bognar, implementing the film's narration in this way created an effect of depicting a worker's inner monologue.

== Reception ==
=== Critical response ===
On the review aggregator website Rotten Tomatoes, 95% of 93 critics' reviews are positive, with an average rating of 8.3/10. The website's consensus reads: "American Factory takes a thoughtful -- and troubling -- look at the dynamic between workers and employers in the 21st-century globalized economy." Metacritic, which uses a weighted average, assigned the film a score of 86 out of 100, based on 23 critics, indicating "universal acclaim".

Manohla Dargis of The New York Times stated: "American Factory is political without being self-servingly didactic or strident, connecting the sociopolitical dots intelligently, sometimes with the help of a stirring score from Chad Cannon that evokes Aaron Copland. The filmmakers don't villainize anyone, though a few participants come awfully close to twirling waxed mustaches, like an American manager who jokes to a Chinese colleague that it would be a good idea to duct-tape the mouths of talky American workers." David Edelstein of New York magazine wrote: "It's a great, expansive, deeply humanist work, angry but empathetic to its core. It gestures toward the end of the working world we know – and to the rise of the machines." Eric Kohn of IndieWire described the film as "A fascinating tragicomedy about the incompatibility of American and Chinese industries."

=== Accolades ===
The film won Best Documentary Feature at the 92nd Academy Awards. It received three nominations at the 72nd Primetime Creative Arts Emmy Awards, winning Outstanding Directing for a Documentary/Nonfiction Program for Bognar and Reichert.

== See also ==
- The Last Truck: Closing of a GM Plant (2009) – a documentary short by Bognar and Reichert about the closing of the GM plant later bought by Fuyao, footage from which is included at the start of American Factory
- Detropia (2012) – a documentary focused on the decline of the economy of Detroit due to long-term changes in the automobile industry
- Roger & Me (1989) – a Michael Moore documentary about General Motors closing its factory in Flint, Michigan, eliminating 35,000 jobs
- Working-class culture
