= William D. Chappelle =

American educator and AME Church Bishop (1857–1925)

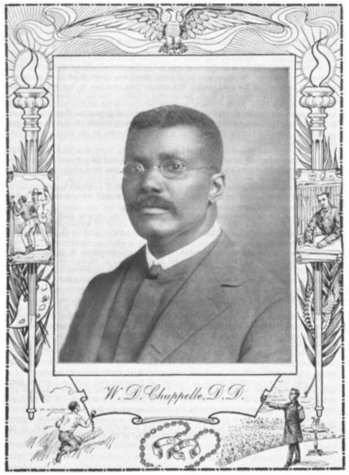
- Born: William David Chappelle; November 16, 1857; Winnsboro, South Carolina, U.S.
- Died: June 15, 1925 (aged 67)
- Occupations: Bishop, President of Allen University
- Children: W. D. Chappelle Jr.
- Relatives: William David Chappelle III (grandson); Dave Chappelle (great-grandson)

William David Chappelle (November 16, 1857 – June 15, 1925) was an American educationalist and bishop of the African Methodist Episcopal Church. Chappelle served as president of Allen University, a historically Black university in Columbia, South Carolina, from 1897 to 1899 and served as the chairman of its board of trustees from 1916 to 1925.

== Early life ==
Chappelle was born enslaved on November 16, 1857, in Winnsboro, South Carolina, one of the eleven children of Henry and Patsy McCory Chappelle.

== Career ==
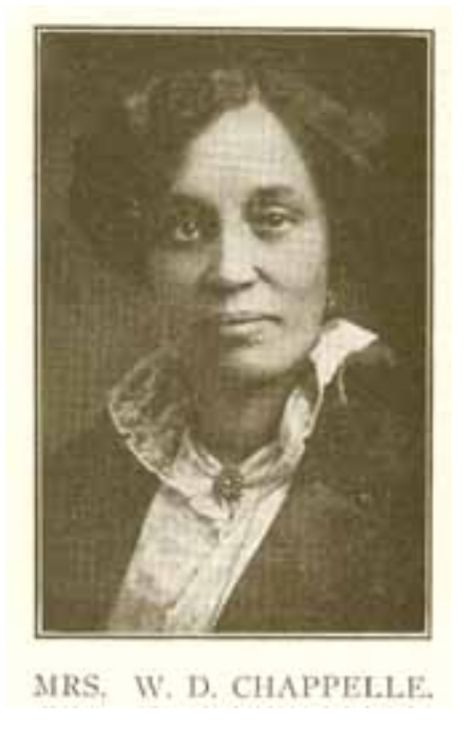
The former Rosina C. Palmer, Chappelle's second wife, in 1916

On March 13, 1918, Bishop Chappelle led a delegation from the bishops' council of the African Methodist Episcopal Church to meet Democratic President Woodrow Wilson at the White House. The delegation came to protest the mounting wave of anti-black violence and hysteria accompanying the Great Migration, including numerous lynchings and other mob violence. Wilson took no action.

== Family and legacy ==
After the death of his first wife, he married Rosina C. Palmer (also recorded as Rosena C. Palmer), who had contributed an essay as a young woman to what the Library of Congress describes as "a collection of essays by African American authors designed to encourage diligence, temperance, and religion among young African Americans." His father-in-law was Robert John Palmer, one of South Carolina's black legislators during the Reconstruction era.

One of his sons, W. D. Chappelle, Jr., was a physician and surgeon who opened the People's Infirmary around 1915, a small hospital and surgery practice in Columbia, South Carolina, during a time when segregation prevented many African Americans from having access to healthcare. He died on June 15, 1925, aged 67.

His great-grandson is stand-up comedian Dave Chappelle, and his grandson was William David Chappelle III. The former would make reference to his great-grandfather's White House visit in his 2020 special 8:46.
