= Dave Chappelle =

American comedian and actor (born 1973)

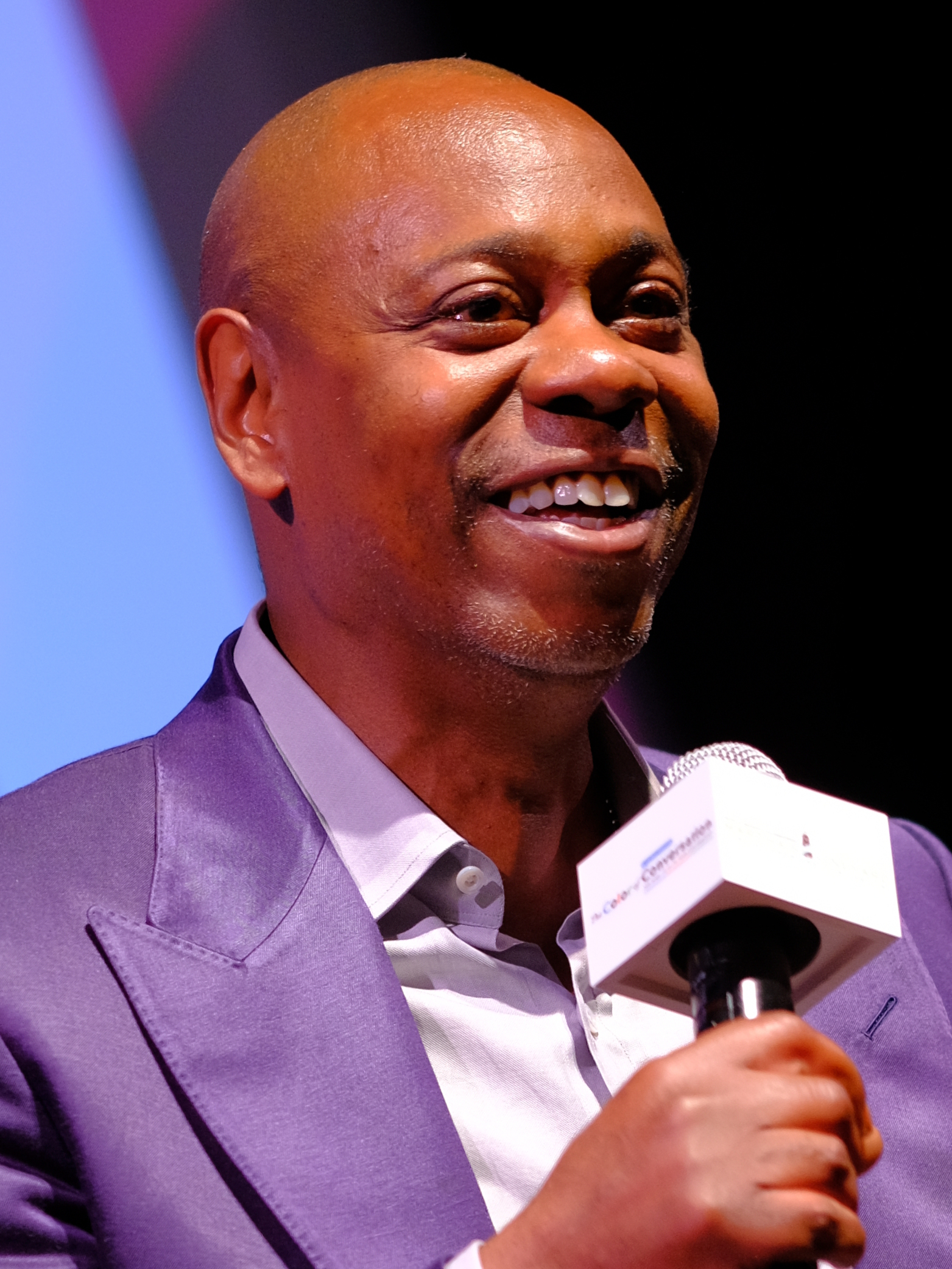
- Chappelle in 2025
- Born: David Khari Webber Chappelle; August 24, 1973 (age 53); Washington, D.C., U.S.
- Spouse: Elaine Erfe (m. 2001)
- Children: 3
- Parent(s): William David Chappelle III; Yvonne Seon
- Relatives: William D. Chappelle (great-grandfather); Robert John Palmer (great-great-grandfather); W. D. Chappelle Jr. (grand-uncle)
- Awards: Full list

Comedy career
- Medium: Stand-up; sketch comedy; television; film
- Genres: Black comedy; insult comedy; observational comedy; racial humor; satire; surreal humor
- Subjects: African-American culture; American politics; current events; human sexuality; LGBTQ people; police brutality; pop culture; race relations; racism in the United States; recreational drug use

David Khari Webber Chappelle (/ʃəˈpɛl/ shə-PEL; born August 24, 1973) is an American stand-up comedian, actor, and former sketch comedian. He debuted his half-hour TV special in 1998 and his hour-long TV special in 2000. Chappelle co-created and starred in the sketch comedy series Chappelle's Show (2003–2006) on Comedy Central before quitting in the middle of production of the third season. After a hiatus, he returned to performing stand-up comedy across the United States. By 2006, Chappelle was called the "comic genius of America" by Esquire magazine and, in 2013, "the best" by a Billboard writer. In 2017, Rolling Stone ranked him No. 9 in their "50 Best Stand Up Comics of All Time".

Chappelle has appeared in various films, including Robin Hood: Men in Tights (1993), The Nutty Professor (1996), Con Air (1997), You've Got Mail (1998), Blue Streak (1999), Undercover Brother (2002), Dave Chappelle's Block Party (2005), Chi-Raq (2015), and A Star Is Born (2018). His first lead role was in the 1998 comedy film Half Baked, which he co-wrote. Chappelle also starred in the ABC comedy series Buddies (1996). In 2016, he signed a $20-million-per-release comedy-special deal with Netflix and released six stand-up specials under the deal.

Chappelle released his first hour-long stand-up special Killin' Them Softly (2000) for HBO, followed by For What It's Worth for Showtime. He has released eight specials for Netflix. He has won six Grammy Awards for Best Comedy Album for The Age of Spin (2018), Equanimity & The Bird Revelation (2019), Sticks & Stones (2019), The Closer (2021), What's in a Name? (2022), and The Dreamer (2023).

He has received numerous accolades, including six Emmy Awards, six Grammy Awards, and the 2019 Mark Twain Prize for American Humor presented by the John F. Kennedy Center for the Performing Arts, considered America's highest comedy honor. Chappelle has twice won the Primetime Emmy Award for Outstanding Guest Actor in a Comedy Series for hosting Saturday Night Live in 2016 and 2020.

== Early life and education ==
David Khari Webber Chappelle was born on August 24, 1973, in Washington, D.C. His father, William David Chappelle III, was a professor of vocal performance and the dean of students at Antioch College in Yellow Springs, Ohio. His mother, Yvonne Seon (née Reed, formerly Chappelle), worked for Congolese prime minister Patrice Lumumba, is a Unitarian Universalist minister, and worked as a professor and university administrator at several institutions including Wright State University and Prince George's Community College. Chappelle has a stepmother and a stepbrother.

Chappelle grew up in Silver Spring, Maryland, and attended Woodlin Elementary School. His parents were politically active, and family house visitors included Pete Seeger and Johnny Hartman. Hartman predicted Chappelle would be a comedian and, around this time, Chappelle's comic inspiration came from Eddie Murphy and Richard Pryor. After his parents separated, Chappelle stayed in Washington with his mother while spending summers with his father in Ohio. In high school he worked as an usher in Ford's Theatre. He attended DC's Eastern High School for a short time before transferring to Duke Ellington School of the Arts, where he studied theater arts, graduating in 1991.

== Career ==
=== 1990–2002: Early career and breakthrough ===
Chappelle was featured in a montage of random people telling jokes in the first episode of ABC's America's Funniest People, airing on September 13, 1990. Following his high school graduation, Chappelle moved to New York City to pursue a career as a comedian. He performed at Harlem's Apollo Theater in front of the "Amateur Night" audience, but he was booed off stage. Chappelle described the experience as the moment that gave him the courage to continue his show business aspirations. He quickly made a name for himself on the New York comedy circuit, even performing in the city's parks. In addition to weekend stand-up gigs, he honed his craft at Monday night "open mic" performances at places such as the Boston Comedy Club on West 3rd Street, as late as the summer 1994. In 1992, he won critical and popular acclaim for his television appearance in Russell Simmons' Def Comedy Jam on HBO. It was his appearance on this show that allowed his popularity to truly begin rising, eventually allowing him to become a regular guest on late-night television shows such as Politically Incorrect, Late Show with David Letterman, The Howard Stern Show, and Late Night with Conan O'Brien. Whoopi Goldberg nicknamed him "The Kid". At 19, he made his film debut as "Ahchoo" in Mel Brooks' Robin Hood: Men in Tights. He also appeared on Star Search three times but lost to competing comedian Lester Barrie; Chappelle later joked about becoming more successful than Barrie. The same year, Chappelle was offered the role of Benjamin Buford "Bubba" Blue in Forrest Gump. Concerned the character was demeaning and the movie would bomb, he turned down the part. He parodied the film in the 1997 short Bowl of Pork, where a dim-witted black man is responsible for the Rodney King beating, the LA riots and O. J. Simpson's being accused of murder. Chappelle played another supporting role in an early Doug Liman film, Getting In, in 1994. At age 19, he was the opening act for R&B soul singer Aretha Franklin.

Chappelle attracted the attention of television network executives and developed numerous pilots but none were picked up for development into a series. In 1995, he made a guest appearance on an episode of ABC's popular sitcom Home Improvement. The storyline had Chappelle and real-life friend and comedian Jim Breuer ask Tim Taylor for advice on their girlfriends. The characters' single outing in the episode proved so popular that ABC decided to give them their own spin-off sitcom titled Buddies. However, after taping a pilot episode, Breuer was fired and replaced with actor Christopher Gartin. Buddies premiered in March 1996 to disappointing ratings and the show was canceled after only five episodes out of 13 that had been produced.

After the failure of Buddies, Chappelle starred in another pilot. According to Chappelle, the network was uncomfortable with the African-American cast and wanted white actors added. Chappelle resisted and subsequently accused the network of racism. Shortly afterward Chappelle's father died and, after returning to Ohio, he considered leaving the entertainment business.

He later appeared as a stand-up insult comic who targets patrons of a nightclub in the 1996 comedy The Nutty Professor starring Eddie Murphy, one of his major comedic influences. He had a minor role in 1997's Con Air. At the beginning of 1998, he did a stand-up performance for HBO Comedy Half-Hour. That same year, he appeared in "Pilots and Pens Lost", an episode of The Larry Sanders Show's sixth season, in which he and the executives of the show's unnamed television network satirize the treatment that scriptwriters and show creators were subjected to, as well as the executives' knee-jerk tendencies toward racial stereotypes.

He and Neal Brennan co-wrote the 1998 cult stoner film Half Baked, Chappelle's first starring role, about a group of marijuana-smoking friends trying to get their other friend out of jail. It made money at the box office and remains a classic "stoner" film, a genre that includes the Cheech & Chong films as well as more recent fare like Judd Apatow's Pineapple Express. In December 1998, Chappelle appeared as Tom Hanks' character's friend and confidant in You've Got Mail. In 1999, he appeared in the Martin Lawrence film Blue Streak.

In 2000, Chappelle recorded his first hour-long HBO special, Dave Chappelle: Killin' Them Softly, in Washington, D.C. He also starred alongside Norm Macdonald in the 2000 comedy film Screwed. He followed this with an appearance as "Conspiracy Brother" in the 2002 racial satire Undercover Brother. During the early 2000s, Chappelle was a member of the Spitkicker artist collective, along with many hip-hop artists like De La Soul and Talib Kweli.

=== 2003–2006: Chappelle's Show ===
In 2003, Chappelle debuted his own weekly sketch comedy show on Comedy Central called Chappelle's Show. The show parodied many aspects of American culture, including racial stereotypes, politics and pop culture. Along with comedy sketches, the show also featured musical performances by mostly hip-hop and soul artists. He promoted the work of other black comedians as well, most notably Paul Mooney and Charlie Murphy.

Due to the show's popularity, Comedy Central's new parent company Viacom offered Chappelle a $55 million contract (giving Chappelle a share of DVD sales) to continue production of Chappelle's Show for two more years while allowing him to do side projects. Chappelle has said that sketches are not his favorite form of comedy, and that the show's format was similar to short films.

In June 2004, based on the popularity of the "Rick James" sketch, it was announced that Chappelle was in talks to portray James in a biopic from Paramount Pictures, also owned by Viacom. James' estate disagreed with the proposed comical tone of the film and put a halt to the talks.

That same month, Chappelle recorded his second comedy special, which aired on Showtime, Dave Chappelle: For What It's Worth, at San Francisco's Fillmore Auditorium, where Lenny Bruce, George Carlin, Richard Pryor, and Robin Williams had performed.

==== Season 3 problems ====
Season 3 was scheduled to begin airing on May 31, 2005, but earlier in May, Chappelle surprised fans and the entertainment industry when he abruptly left during production and took a trip to South Africa. Chappelle said that he was unhappy with the direction the show had taken, and expressed in an interview with Time magazine his need for reflection in the face of tremendous stress. Chappelle said on Inside the Actors Studio that the death of his father seven years prior influenced his decision to go to South Africa. By throwing himself into his work, he had not taken a chance to mourn his father's death. He also said the rumors that he was on drug or psychiatric treatment only persuaded him to stay in South Africa.

In an interview with Oprah Winfrey that aired on February 3, 2006, Chappelle stated that burnout, a loss of creative control, and a work environment that was uncomfortable, were some of the reasons he left the show. He did not rule out returning to Chappelle's Show to "finish what we started", but promised that he would not return without changes to the production. Chappelle expressed disdain at the possibility of his material from the unfinished third season being aired, stating that to do so would be "a bully move", and that he would not return to the show if Comedy Central were to air the unfinished material. On July 9, 2006, Comedy Central aired the first episode of Chappelle's Show: The Lost Episodes. After the DVD release, Chappelle was interviewed by Anderson Cooper on CNN and reiterated he would not return to Chappelle's Show. An uncensored DVD release of the episodes was made available on July 25.

Chappelle's abrupt departure from the show continues to be a focus of interviews and profiles of him and of his own comedy. His decision to quit the show meant walking away from a $50 million contract with Comedy Central and forming a rift with longtime collaborator Neal Brennan. The show still plays in syndication on several television networks, despite the relatively small number of episodes compared to most American syndicated television programs. In Bird Revelation, Chappelle draws an analogy between his departure and the book Pimp, the memoir of Iceberg Slim.

=== 2004: Dave Chappelle's Block Party ===
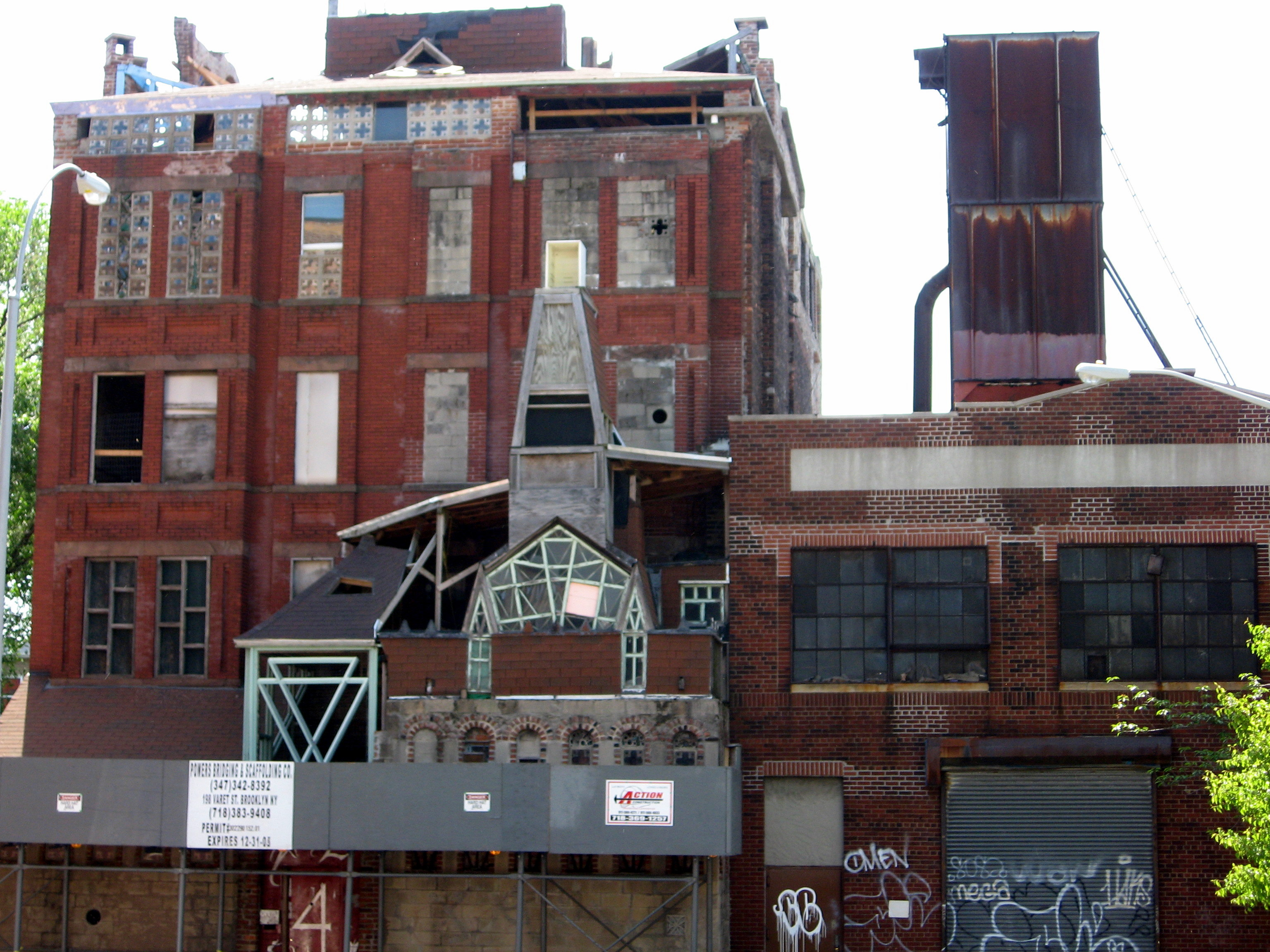
The Broken Angel House in Brooklyn on May 16, 2007, which was the site of the documentary Dave Chappelle's Block Party (2005)

Chappelle was the star and a producer of the Michel Gondry-directed documentary Dave Chappelle's Block Party, which chronicles his hosting a free concert in the Clinton Hill neighborhood of Brooklyn on September 18, 2004. Several musical artists, including Kanye West, The Roots, Erykah Badu, Mos Def, Dead Prez and Jill Scott, are featured in the movie both performing in the concert and in conversation off-stage; Chappelle brought Yellow Springs residents to Brooklyn at his own expense. Another highlight of the event was the temporary reunion of 1990s hip-hop group The Fugees.

Chappelle toured several cities in February and March 2006 to promote the film under the name "Block Party All-Stars Featuring Dave Chappelle". Universal Pictures' genre division, Rogue Pictures, released the film in the U.S. on March 3, 2006. It was a success, grossing a total of $11.7 million on a $3 million budget.

=== 2005–2015: Infrequent comedy appearances ===
Chappelle has been known to make impromptu and unannounced appearances at comedy venues, and continued to do so following his post–Chappelle's Show return to stand-up comedy. In June 2005, Chappelle performed impromptu stand-up shows in Los Angeles, then went on a tour that began in Newport, Kentucky, not far from his Ohio home. On May 11, 2006, he made a prearranged, but quietly marketed, surprise appearance at Towson University's annual Tigerfest celebration. He made another appearance on HBO's Def Poetry, where he performed two poems, titled "Fuck Ashton Kutcher" and "How I Got the Lead on Jeopardy!".

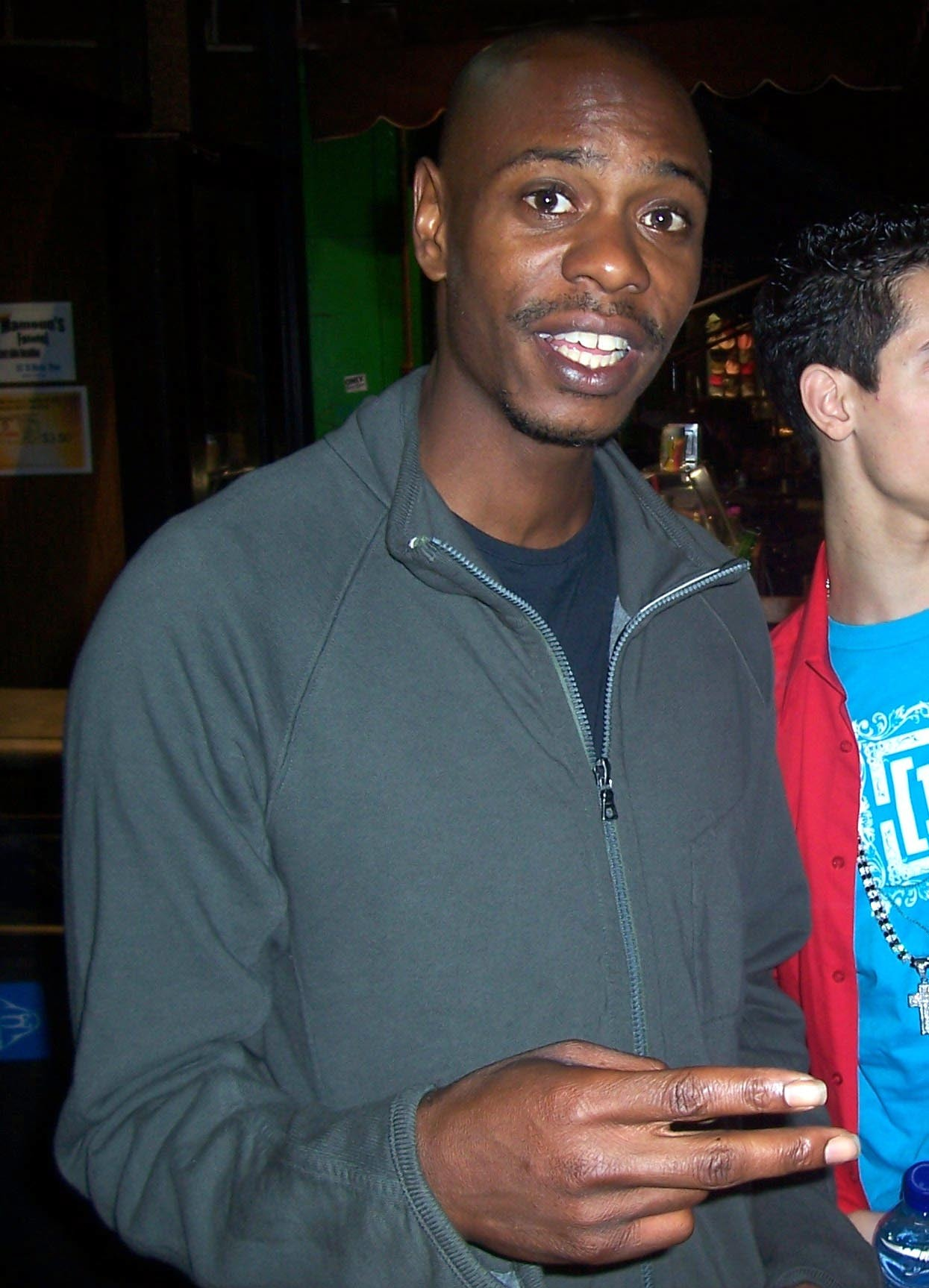
Chappelle in 2007

In April 2007, Chappelle set a stand-up endurance record at the Laugh Factory Sunset Strip comedy club, beating comedian Dane Cook's record of three hours and 50 minutes. In December of the same year, Chappelle broke his own record with a time of six hours and 12 minutes. Cook reclaimed the record in January 2008, with a time of seven hours. On November 19, 2009, Chappelle performed at the Laugh Factory again, where it was speculated that he would attempt to take back the record. However, according to the club owner, he was disqualified after he left the stage five hours into his routine. Chappelle again appeared on Inside the Actors Studio and, in celebration of the show's 200th episode, he interviewed the show's usual host, James Lipton. The episode aired on November 11, 2008. He appeared again on Inside the Actors Studio in 2013, for its 250th episode. In February 2009, Chappelle did a four-hour set at Comic Strip Live in New York. In August 2011, Chappelle appeared at Comedy Jam in San Francisco.

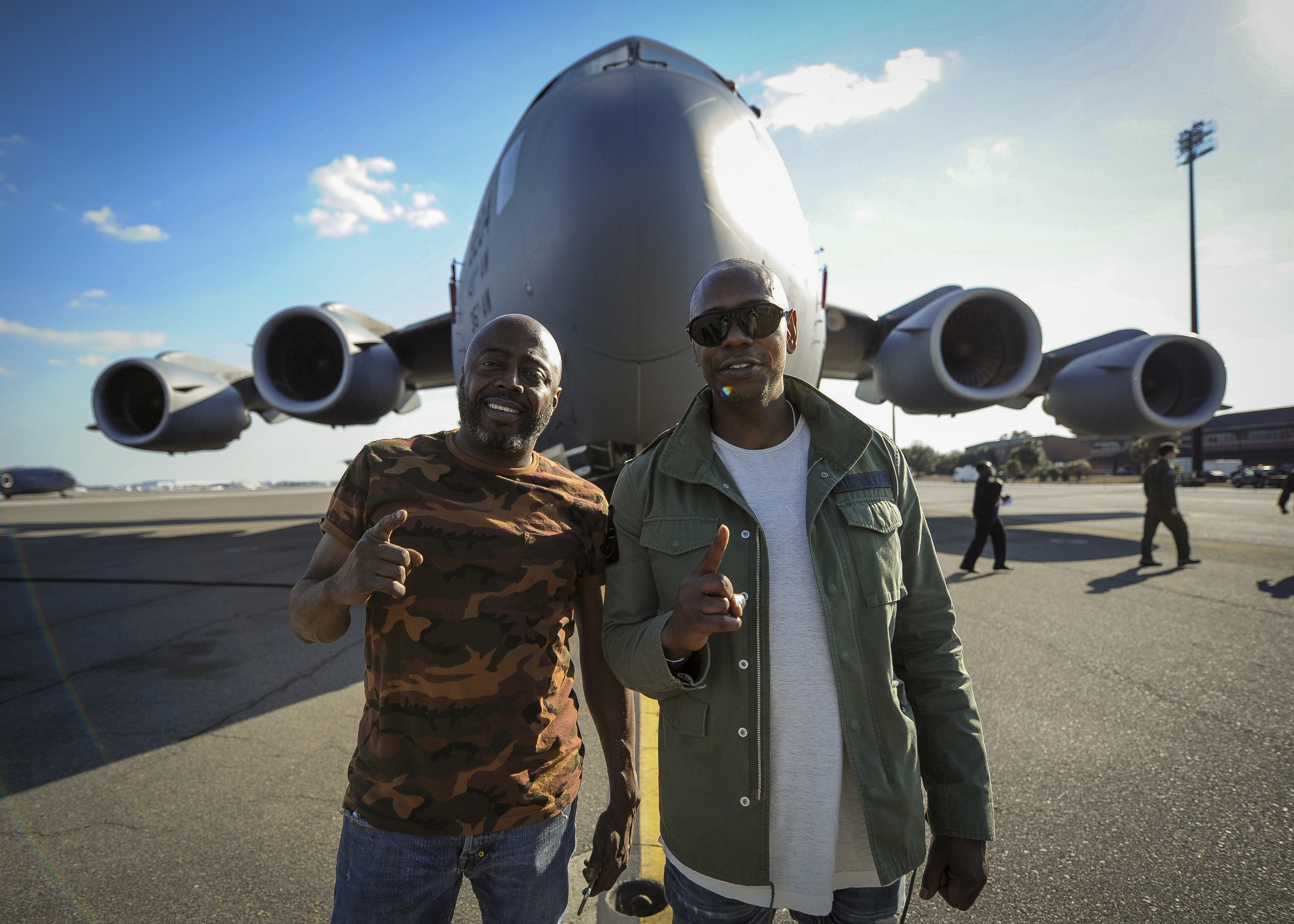
Chappelle (right) and Donnell Rawlings (left) stand in front of a C-17 Globemaster III at Joint Base Charleston, S.C. (2017)

In August 2013, Chappelle returned to full-time touring stand-up, as a headliner, when he was featured during the Oddball Comedy & Curiosity festival. Sponsored by Funny or Die, Chappelle co-headlined with comedy act Flight of the Conchords. During a stop in Hartford, Chappelle walked off the stage due to heckling from the crowd that lasted throughout his entire performance. The heckling was so raucous that it drowned out Chappelle's voice over the P.A. system and included chants of "White Power", a line used in a Chappelle's Show episode, that was viewed as wildly uncalled-for and out-of-context by other audience members who later wrote about the event. A few days later, Chappelle stopped in Chicago for a performance. The comedy website ComedyHype.com acquired and released audio of him on stage responding to the heckling. Chappelle referenced the Hartford incident, stating that "young, white, alcoholic[s]" should be blamed for the prior incident, that he hoped North Korea would bomb Hartford, that in the future he would not stop in Hartford for gas, and finally summarizing his feelings on the situation by saying, "Fuck Hartford!" However, in August 2014 Chappelle returned to Hartford for a surprise appearance at the 2014 Oddball Festival and received standing ovations during his set.

In June 2014, Chappelle made his first major New York City appearance in eleven years, performing ten nights at Radio City Music Hall. Chappelle promoted the dates by appearing on The Today Show, The Tonight Show Starring Jimmy Fallon and Late Show with David Letterman. In 2015, Chappelle appeared in the Spike Lee film Chi-Raq, his first film role in 13 years.

=== 2016–2019: Career comeback ===
On November 12, 2016, Chappelle made his hosting debut on Saturday Night Live the weekend after Donald Trump won the 2016 presidential election. The show also featured A Tribe Called Quest as the musical guest. In his opening monologue, Chappelle tackled Trump and the election head on. He ended his monologue by stating, "I'm wishing Donald Trump luck, and I'm going to give him a chance, and we, the historically disenfranchised, demand that he give us one too." His performance on SNL received widespread acclaim from critics and audiences alike. At the 69th Primetime Emmy Awards, he received an Emmy Award for Outstanding Guest Actor in a Comedy Series for his appearance. He donated the Emmy to his former high school while filming an episode of Jerry Seinfeld's Netflix series, Comedians in Cars Getting Coffee (Season 10, Episode 2: "Nobody Says, 'I Wish I Had A Camera'").

On November 21, 2016, Netflix announced that they would be releasing three new stand-up comedy specials from Chappelle in 2017, with Chappelle being paid $20 million per special. The first two specials were released on Netflix on March 21, 2017, and hail directly from Chappelle's personal comedy vault. "Deep in the Heart of Texas" was filmed at Austin City Limits Live in April 2015, and "The Age of Spin" was filmed at the Hollywood Palladium in March 2016. The specials marked the comedian's first concert specials released in 12 years, and proved to be an immediate success as Netflix announced a month later that they were the most viewed comedy specials in Netflix's history.

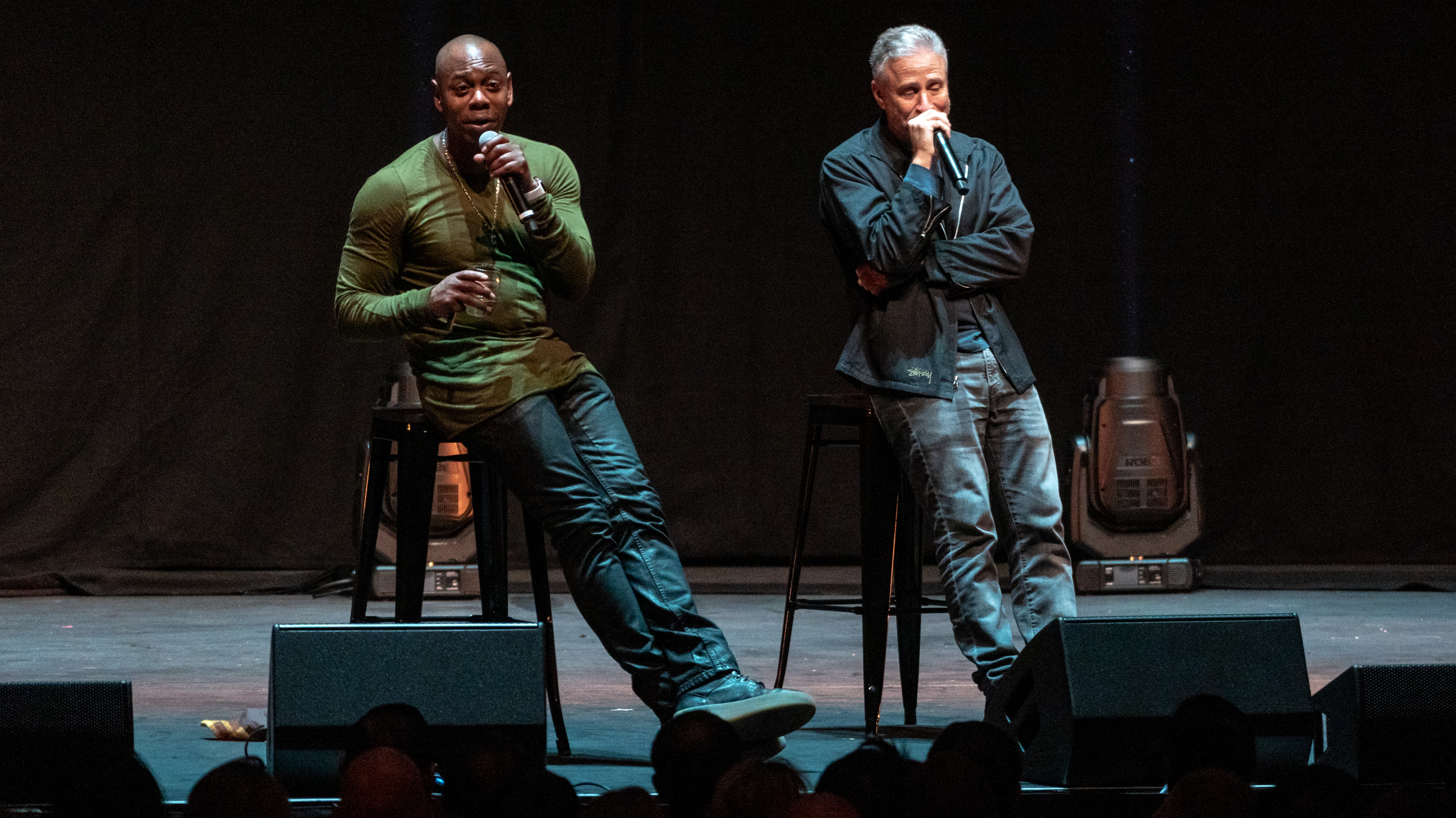
Chappelle with Jon Stewart performing at Royal Albert Hall in 2018

The third special, Equanimity, was filmed in September 2017 at the Warner Theater in Washington, D.C., and then on November 20, 2017, Chappelle filmed a fourth special, The Bird Revelation, at The Comedy Store in Los Angeles. On December 22, 2017, Netflix announced the expansion of the deal to include The Bird Revelation, which was released with Equanimity on December 31.

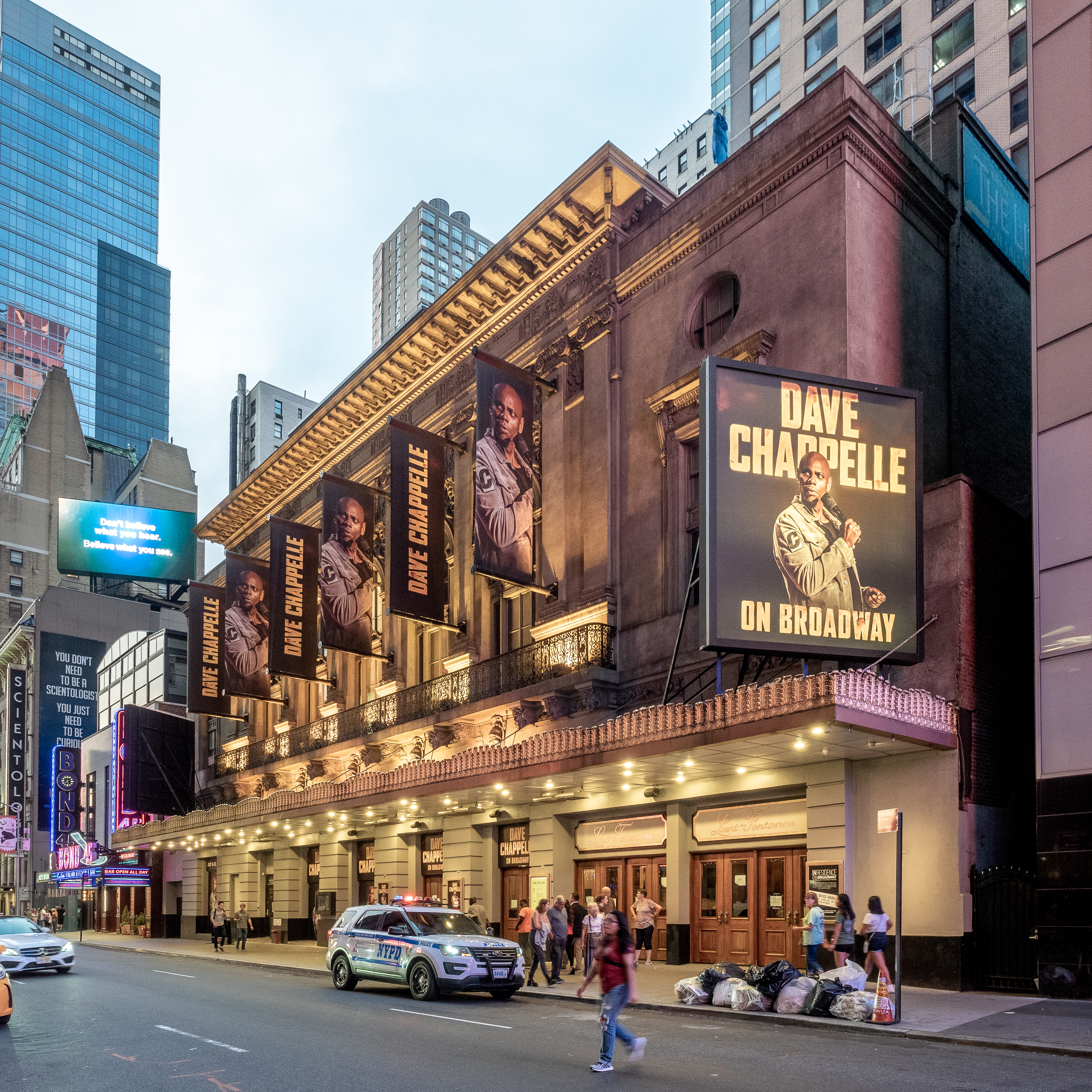
Chappelle stand-up on Broadway at the Lunt-Fontanne Theatre in 2019

In January 2018 at the 60th Annual Grammy Awards, Chappelle received a Grammy Award for Best Comedy Album for his first two 2017 specials The Age of Spin & Deep in the Heart of Texas. In September 2018, Chappelle's Equanimity special received an Emmy Award for Outstanding Variety Special (Pre-Recorded). In October 2018, Chappelle returned to the big screen as "Noodles", Jackson Maine's best friend and retired musician in Bradley Cooper's directorial debut, a remake of A Star Is Born. The film was a massive critical and commercial success. He was nominated along with the cast for the Screen Actors Guild Award for Best Cast in a Motion Picture. In 2018, Chappelle and Jon Stewart joined forces for a duo comedy tour in the United States, and across the United Kingdom. He has also collaborated with Aziz Ansari for three stand-up shows in Austin, Texas, at the Paramount Theater.

In February 2019, Chappelle was nominated for and won the Grammy Award for Best Comedy Album for Equanimity and Bird Revelation.

In 2019, Chappelle was chosen to receive the annual Mark Twain Prize for American Humor presented by John F. Kennedy Center for the Performing Arts. President of the Kennedy Center Deborah Rutter stated, "Dave is the embodiment of Mark Twain's observation that 'against the assault of humor, nothing can stand'... and for three decades, Dave has challenged us to see hot-button issues from his entirely original yet relatable experience." The set of people honoring Chappelle included Jon Stewart, Bradley Cooper, Morgan Freeman, Lorne Michaels, Tiffany Haddish, Aziz Ansari, Sarah Silverman, Neal Brennan, Q-Tip, Mos Def, John Legend, Frederic Yonnet, Erykah Badu, Common, SNL cast members Kenan Thompson, Michael Che and Colin Jost, as well as Eddie Murphy. The Prize was awarded at the Kennedy Center gala on October 27, 2019. The ceremony was broadcast on PBS January 7, 2020. The Mayor of the District of Columbia, Muriel Bowser, declared the day of the award ceremony "Dave Chappelle Day" in Washington, D.C.

On August 26, 2019, Chappelle's fifth Netflix special, Dave Chappelle: Sticks & Stones, was released. The special garnered controversy, and backlash for jokes about abuse allegations against singers Michael Jackson and R. Kelly, as well as for jokes about the LGBT community and cancel culture. The following year, Sticks & Stones won the Grammy Award for Best Comedy Album.

=== 2020–present ===
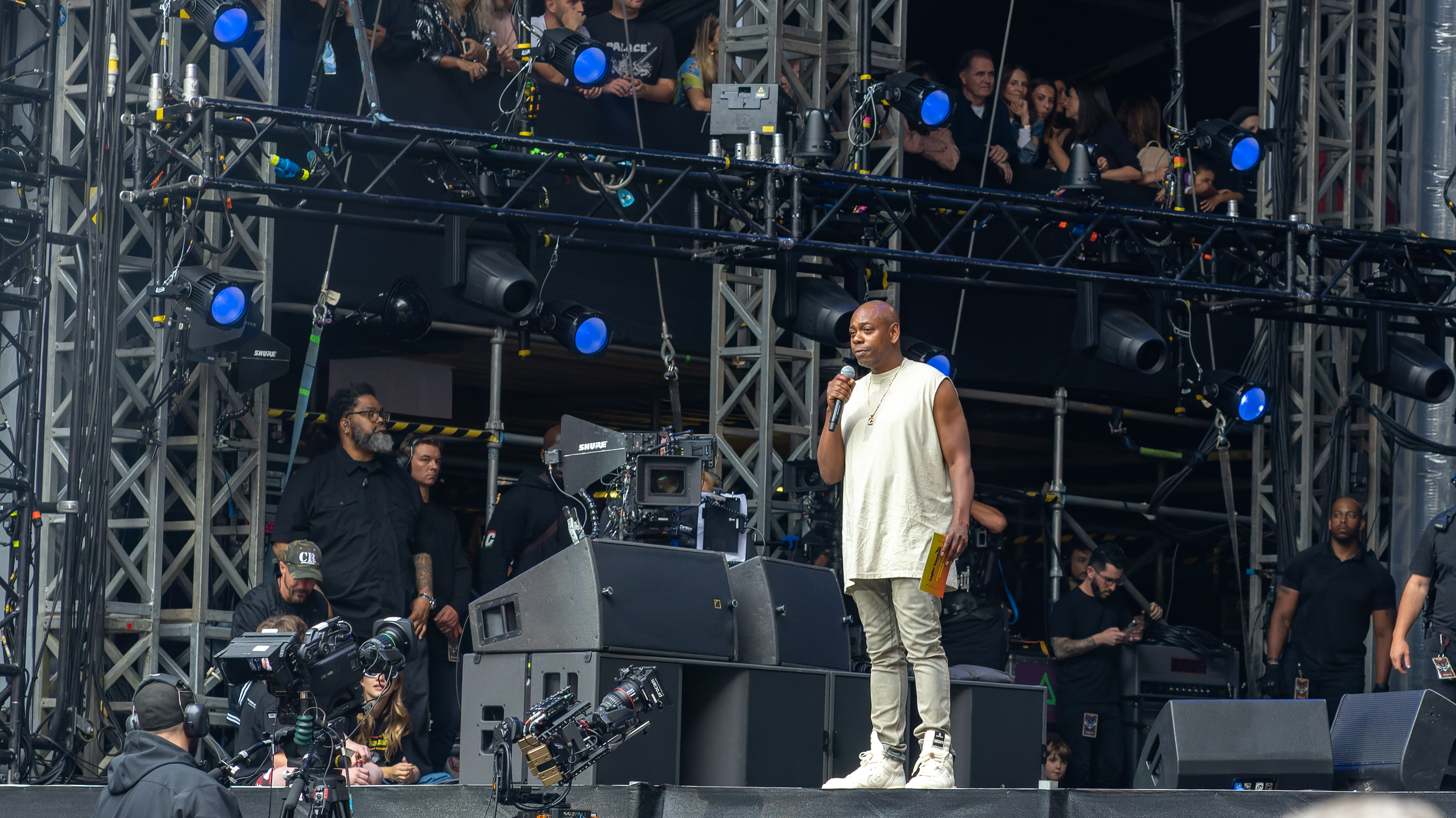
Chappelle at Wembley Stadium in 2022

On June 12, 2020, Netflix released 8:46, a 27-minute and 20-second video of newly recorded stand-up by Chappelle on the YouTube channel "Netflix Is a Joke". The private event was held outdoors on June 6, 2020, in Yellow Springs, Ohio, where audience members observed social distancing rules and wore masks to prevent the spread of COVID-19. The title was chosen in reference to the 8 minutes and 46 seconds that police officer Derek Chauvin knelt on the neck of George Floyd, leading to his death. Chappelle touches on Floyd's murder and subsequent protests and takes aim at Don Lemon, Laura Ingraham and Candace Owens.

Expanding on the concept of the socially distanced comedy presentation, beginning with a pair of performances in late June 2020 and officially kicking off with a Fourth of July celebration, "Chappelle and friends" hosted what became known as "Chappelle Summer Camp", which brought live performances to a masked, socially distanced audience at Wirrig Pavilion, in Yellow Springs, Ohio. These shows featured regular performances from comedians Michelle Wolf, Mohammed Amer and Donnell Rawlings, as well as Chappelle's tour DJ, DJ Trauma and frequent special guests including Jon Stewart, Chris Rock, Louis C.K., Sarah Silverman, David Letterman, Bill Burr, Michael Che, Brian Regan, Chris Tucker, Kevin Hart, Ali Wong, Trevor Noah, Tiffany Haddish, with musical guests John Mayer, Common, and many others. After several shows in July, some issues arose from neighbors' complaints of noise and disturbances, local zoning officials granted a special variance allowing the performances to continue through October 4, 2020. The Chappelle Summer Camp series of shows ended suddenly September 25, 2020, when Elaine Chappelle announced in a closed Facebook fan group that there had been a possible COVID-19 exposure in their inner circle, and all further performances were canceled.

It was announced that Chappelle would return to host Saturday Night Live the weekend of the 2020 United States presidential election, his second time giving a post-presidential election monologue. Due to the effect of the COVID-19 pandemic on the vote count, the results were delayed and announced earlier that Saturday. In response to unfounded allegations that Joe Biden's presidency had been stolen from Donald Trump, Chappelle offered jokes ranging from Trump's handling of the pandemic to his resulting legacy, and the political future of the United States, in his 16-minute opening monologue, "Everyone knows how that feels. But here's the difference between me and you: You guys hate each other for that, and I don't hate anybody. I just hate that feeling. That's what I fight through. That's what I suggest you fight through. You've got a find a way to live your life. You've got to find a way to forgive each other. You've got to find a way to find joy in your existence in spite of that feeling". Critics and audiences praised the monologue describing it as "scathing", "illuminating" and "powerful".

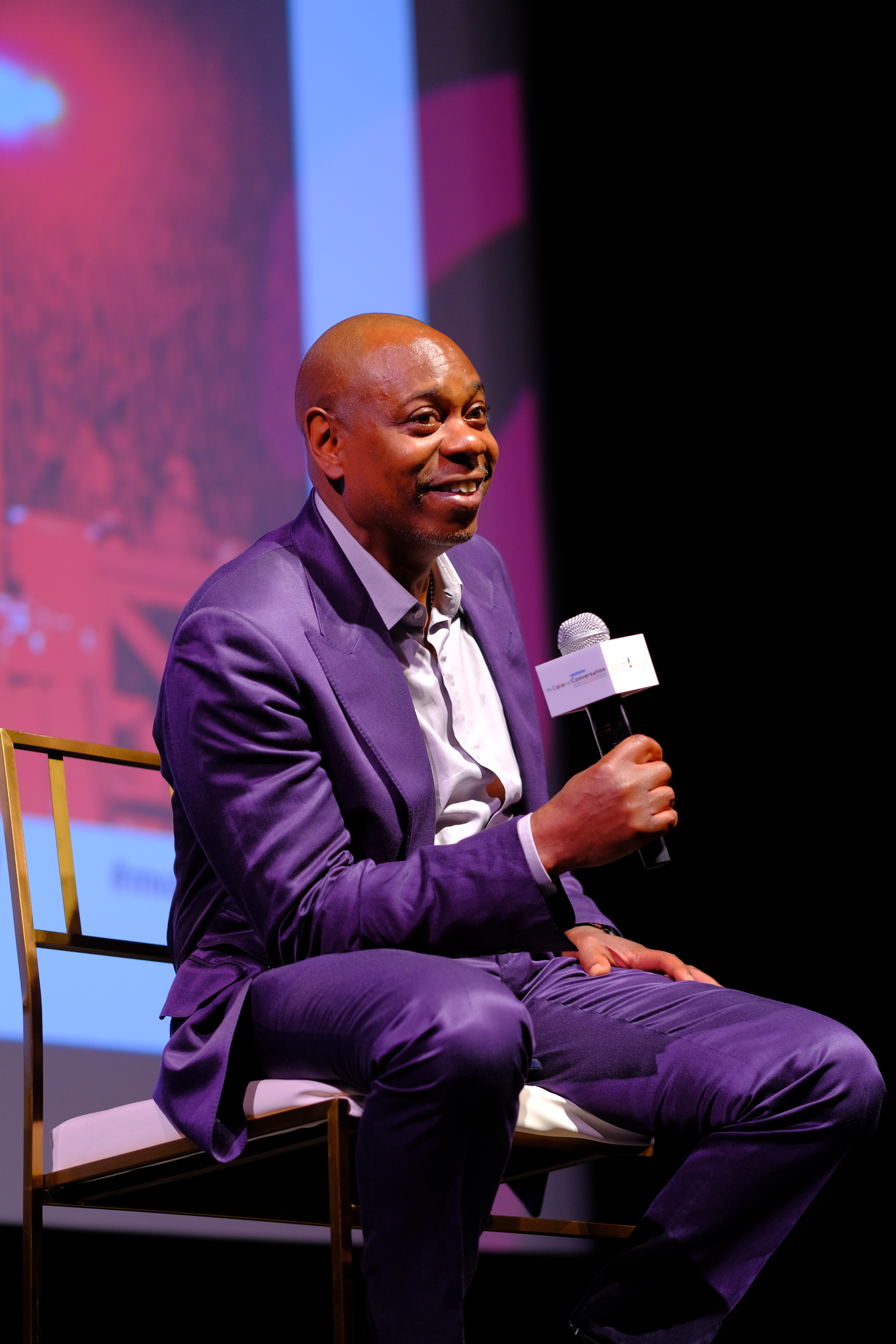
Chappelle at Martha's Vineyard African American Film Festival Premiere of "Dave Chappelle In Real Life" in 2025

In December 2020, Chappelle's company, Iron Table Holdings purchased a fire station near his Yellow Springs, Ohio, home, with plans to convert it into a comedy club. He also retrofitted a mechanic's garage in the same village into a clubhouse, and dubbed it "The Shack", for podcasting. On October 5, 2021, Chappelle starred in his sixth Netflix special The Closer. In The Closer, Chappelle made jokes about gay and transgender people, particularly transgender women, that some considered transphobic - including one instance where he non-jokingly said "I'm team terf" and expressed support for JK Rowling. Simultaneously, Chappelle argued that he was not anti-transgender, bringing up his opposition to North Carolina's anti-transgender bathroom laws and his friendship with the late Daphne Dorman. The special was met with some backlash, including from students of Chappelle's alma mater Duke Ellington School. On October 20, Netflix employees organized a walkout demonstrating their support of the transgender community and demanding that The Closer be taken off of Netflix. CEO Ted Sarandos acknowledged that "storytelling has real impact in the real world" but refused to take down the special, stating that he "does not believe it falls into hate speech". In November 2021, Saturday Night Live lampooned the controversy during its Weekend Update segment, stating, "A Washington, D.C. art school is postponing renaming its theater, after alumni Dave Chappelle's Netflix controversy. Well, of course, because God forbid, you should name a building after someone problematic in Washington, D.C." In summer of 2022, Chappelle announced that he would not give his name to the Duke Ellington School theater, instead insisting it should be named the Theater for Artistic Freedom and Expression.

Dave Chappelle: Live in Real Life, a documentary covering Chappelle's concerts in Yellow Springs during the COVID-19 pandemic, premiered at Tribeca Film Festival in June 2021, followed by a series of roadshow events in the United States and Canada and a limited theatrical release on November 19, 2021.

In the early hours of May 4, 2022, Chappelle was performing at the Hollywood Bowl in Los Angeles, California, as part of the Netflix Is a Joke Festival, where he was tackled onstage by a member of the audience, who was swiftly subdued by security. The attacker was later found to have been armed with a replica handgun containing a knife blade. Chappelle's four-night stint at the Hollywood Bowl ties him with Monty Python for the most headlined shows by a comedian at the venue.

On November 12, 2022, Chappelle hosted Saturday Night Live for the third time. On February 5, 2023, he received his fourth Grammy Award for Best Comedy Album for The Closer. On December 31, 2023, Netflix released Chappelle's latest special, The Dreamer, which debuted at No. 5 on the chart with 2.2 million views. On January 18, 2025, Chappelle hosted Saturday Night Live in its first show of 2025, marking Chappelle's fourth time hosting. His 17-minute monologue included commentary on recent events, including the January 2025 Southern California wildfires, Jimmy Carter's death, and Donald Trump's reelection to the United States presidency.

== Controversies ==
=== Sticks & Stones (2019) ===
In 2019, after the release of Sticks & Stones, Chappelle was criticised for jokes about the LGBTQ+ community, the #MeToo movement, Anthony Bourdain's suicide, and for humorously defending Kevin Hart and Michael Jackson. The special debuted with a 0% critics' score on Rotten Tomatoes; it received mixed reviews overall, with the audience rating being far more favourable than the critics'.

=== The Closer and Netflix walkout (2021) ===
In October 2021, Chappelle released the Netflix special The Closer, which was condemned as transphobic and homophobic by advocacy groups and some Netflix employees. During the show Chappelle called himself "team TERF", aligned himself with J. K. Rowling's trans stances, and defended rapper DaBaby after homophobic comments he had made. The National Black Justice Coalition and other groups criticised Chappelle for ignoring the diversity of the LGBTQ+ community. Days later, a screening audience gave him a standing ovation; he responded, "If this is what being canceled is like, I love it." Chappelle said he was not transphobic but was critical of political correctness. Netflix co‑CEO Ted Sarandos defended the special, citing creative freedom, and said the company would not remove it. His stance prompted a virtual walkout and public rally by Netflix staff, who argued the company was disregarding the dignity of its trans workforce.

=== First Avenue cancellation and SNL monologue (2022) ===
In July 2022, the Minneapolis venue First Avenue cancelled a Chappelle show on the day of the performance, citing backlash at the announcement and Chappelle's prior material about LGBTQ+ individuals, whom he referred to as "transgender lunatics." He instead performed that night at the city's Varsity Theater. Later that year, Chappelle hosted Saturday Night Live and delivered a 15‑minute monologue addressing rising antisemitism in popular culture. His approach was criticised by Jonathan Greenblatt, national director of the Anti-Defamation League, and other figures for joking about Kanye West's antisemitic remarks and perpetuating stereotypes of Jewish control of the entertainment industry.

=== The Dreamer (2023) ===
In 2023, Chappelle released the special The Dreamer, devoting roughly twelve minutes to jokes about transgender and disabled people. The material included a sketch about a Black transgender woman whose pronoun was a racial slur, a comment that he would "identify as a woman" if jailed in California in order to be sent to a women's prison, and a joke that the man who attacked him at the Hollywood Bowl had "a knife that identified as a gun". Reactions were mixed: some viewers condemned him for "punching down," while others defended the performance; advocacy groups renewed their call for Netflix to distance itself from Chappelle. Sarandos later admitted he had "screwed up" the internal communications about The Closer.

=== Riyadh Comedy Festival ===
In September 2025, Chappelle performed at the inaugural Riyadh Comedy Festival in Saudi Arabia, an event organized as part of the Kingdom's cultural and entertainment expansion under Saudi Vision 2030.

Human Rights Watch responded to the festival, with researcher Joey Shea arguing that the Saudi government was using the comedy event to "whitewash" its human‑rights record and divert attention from ongoing repression. The organisation urged international performers not to assist the regime in improving its public image.

=== Charlie Kirk assassination comment ===
In November 2026, at a stand up event in Madison Square Garden, Chappelle made a comment based on his feelings on the year anniversary of the assassination of Charlie Kirk, a right wing political activist: "I feel fucked up saying this. It's scary being a public figure, and I mean look, ever since that guy, Charlie Kirk, got murdered... and I shouldn't say this publicly, but I feel better!" Conservative media outlets and members criticized Chappelle's comments; Kirk's widow, Erika Kirk, condemned Chappelle's words as "beyond disgusting" and criticized the surrounding culture that resulted after her husband's death. Some also noticed how Kirk also previously defended Chappelle when he was attacked on stage in May 2022.

== Influences ==
In his interview with Inside the Actors Studio host James Lipton, he said that his biggest influences in comedy are Richard Pryor, Eddie Murphy, Mort Sahl, Chris Rock, Paul Mooney, and Mel Blanc.

When asked about his earliest influence in comedy, Chappelle said:

You know who was a big influence on me that is really weird is Bugs Bunny. That's just weird. If you watch a lot of the stuff I do, you can almost see the influence in it, because these animators would animate these performances that were off the hook, and the guy that, the guy that did the voices was Mel Blanc. This guy was like some kind of savant or genius or something. But they had some kind of real big comedic influence on me, like, I liked those cartoons, I think that was my first real big comedy influence, was a rabbit.

When asked about the biggest influence on him in comedy, Chappelle spoke of Richard Pryor:

What a precedent he set—not just as a comic, but as a person. The fact that someone could open themselves up so completely is incredible. It's hard enough to speak honestly in front of people, or even to be vulnerable with your closest friends. But to expose everything to the world—I freebase, I beat my women, I shot my car—and still have people respond without anger? They understood him. Somehow, they just understood. And when I was going through everything this year, his example was what I held onto. It gave me the courage to step back onstage.

== Awards and accolades ==
Chappelle has received many awards and nominations for his work in stand-up and television including three consecutive Grammy Awards for Best Comedy Album. He has also received five Primetime Emmy Awards and one Screen Actors Guild Award nomination along with the ensemble of A Star Is Born.

In 2017, Columbia, South Carolina, Mayor Steven Benjamin declared February 3 "Dave Chappelle Day" when Chappelle spoke at the Chappelle Auditorium at Allen University, a building named after his great-grandfather, Bishop William David Chappelle, who worked at the university.

In 2019, Chappelle was awarded the Mark Twain Prize for American Humor at the John F. Kennedy Center for the Performing Arts. Those to honor Chappelle at the event included Jon Stewart, Bradley Cooper, Aziz Ansari, Sarah Silverman, Chris Tucker, Frederic Yonnet and Lorne Michaels. The award ceremony was turned into a television special and released on Netflix and received a Primetime Emmy Award for Outstanding Variety Special (Pre-Recorded) nomination.

His work, as well as that of Margaret Cho, was also the subject of a book by Canadian dramaturg Elizabeth Ludwig, American Stand-Up and Sketch Comedy, that was published at the end of 2010.

== Activism and advocacy ==
=== Philanthropy ===
In 2004, he donated his time to Seeds of Peace International Camp, a camp located in Otisfield, Maine, which brings together young leaders from communities in conflict.

Chappelle supports his high school, Duke Ellington School of the Arts. He has financially contributed to the school over the years, visited and gave a commencement speech. During his acceptance speech at the 2017 Emmy Awards, Chappelle gave a shout-out to D.C. Public Schools. In November 2021, the school was set to rename their auditorium in Chappelle's honor. Following controversy in response to jokes made in The Closer, the renaming ceremony was delayed until April 2022. Instead, Chappelle made an unannounced stop at the school to host a school assembly and Q&A session, asking only students who had an issue with Chappelle to come forward to ask questions. Following the assembly, the school decided to go forward with renaming the auditorium, respecting the wishes of school co-founder Peggy Cooper Cafritz.

In 2020, Yellow Springs' NPR radio station, WYSO, was headquartered in a leaking and maintenance-needy old building on the campus of Antioch College, and was considering a move to Dayton, a much larger market. Believing the station was part of the lifeblood of the town, Chappelle purchased an historic schoolhouse in late 2020 and offered in 2021 to renovate it for WYSO, as well as add a new addition, if WYSO could be persuaded to stay in Yellow Springs. The station agreed, and the ribbon cutting on the new facility was held in April 2026.

=== Politics ===
Chappelle endorsed Andrew Yang in the 2020 United States presidential election.

In December 2021, Chappelle told the Yellow Springs, Ohio, village council that he would cancel his planned business investments, including his restaurant and comedy club, if it approved a zoning change to allow a multifamily affordable housing project. The affordable housing had been negotiated between the village and the developer as a condition of approval for its plan to build 143 single-unit homes. Chappelle stated that he is not against affordable housing; he is against "the poorly vetted, cookie-cutter, sprawl-style development deal which has little regard for the community, culture and infrastructure of the village". He also argued that only three of the 143 lots would have been affordable housing. On February 7, 2022, he again spoke up against the zoning change at the council meeting held to vote on the approval, calling the council "clowns" and reminding them that his business was worth $65 million a year. The council failed to approve the change, deadlocking at 2–2, with one recusal.

During an October 19, 2023 show in Boston, Chappelle described Israel's actions during the Gaza war as war crimes. Chappelle also condemned the United States for aiding Israel and Hamas for the October 7 attacks. The audience reaction to Chappelle's statements was mixed; some audience members cheered, some heckled, and others walked out. In May 2024, in an appearance in Abu Dhabi, Chappelle said that "genocide is striking the Gaza Strip amid the Israel-Hamas war", while urging Americans to fight antisemitism so Jews do not feel like they need to be protected by Israel. During his January 19, 2025, Saturday Night Live monologue, he exhorted President Donald Trump: "Whether they like you or not, they're all counting on you. Please do better next time. Do not forget your humanity and please have empathy for displaced people, whether they're in the Palisades or Palestine".

Chappelle headlined a campaign event for actor Hill Harper, who was running against Congresswoman Elissa Slotkin in the Democratic primary ahead of Michigan's 2024 U.S. Senate election, at Saint Andrews Hall in Detroit.

== Personal life ==
=== Family and marriage ===
His great-grandfather Bishop William D. Chappelle, born into slavery in 1857, served as a president of Allen University and led a delegation of Blacks who met President Woodrow Wilson at the White House. His grand-uncle W. D. Chappelle Jr. was a physician and surgeon who opened the People's Infirmary around 1915, a small hospital and surgery practice in Columbia, South Carolina, when segregation prevented many Black Americans from having access to healthcare.

Chappelle married Elaine Mendoza Erfe in 2001. The couple has two sons and one daughter. They live on a 65-acre (26-hectare) farm near Yellow Springs, Ohio. Chappelle also owned several houses in Xenia, Ohio. He told Yellow Springs' residents in September 2006, "Turns out you don't need $50 million to live around these parts, just a nice smile and a kind way about you. You guys are the best neighbors ever. That's why I came back and that's why I'm staying."

=== Faith and beliefs ===
Chappelle converted to Islam when he was 17. He told Time magazine in May 2005, "I don't normally talk about my religion publicly because I don't want people to associate me and my flaws with this beautiful thing. And I believe it is beautiful if you learn it the right way." Chappelle appears in a video explaining the religious history of the Well of Zamzam in Mecca. He has also explained that his faith helped him use his career to benefit people.

== Filmography ==
=== Stand-up specials ===
Year	Title	Platform	Type	Ref.
2000	Killin' Them Softly	HBO	Stand-up comedy	
2004	For What It's Worth	Showtime	Stand-up comedy	
2017	The Age of Spin	Netflix	Stand-up comedy	
2017	Deep in the Heart of Texas	Netflix	Stand-up comedy	
2017	Equanimity	Netflix	Stand-up comedy	
2017	The Bird Revelation	Netflix	Stand-up comedy	
2019	Sticks & Stones	Netflix	Stand-up comedy	
2020	8:46	YouTube	Performance speech	
2020	Unforgiven	IGTV	Performance speech	
2021	Redemption Song	IGTV	Performance speech	
2021	The Closer	Netflix	Stand-up comedy	
2022	What's in a Name?	Netflix	Acceptance speech	
2023	The Dreamer	Netflix	Stand-up comedy	
2025	The Unstoppable	Netflix	Stand-up comedy	

=== Television ===
Year	Title	Role	Notes
1992–1995	Def Comedy Jam	Himself	2 episodes
1995	Home Improvement	Dave	Episode: "Talk to Me"
1996	Buddies	Dave Carlisle	14 episodes, lead role
1997	Dr. Katz, Professional Therapist	Dave	Voice, episode: "Electric Bike"
1997	Happily Ever After: Fairy Tales for Every Child	Spider	Episode: "Mother Goose" (voice)
1998	The Larry Sanders Show	Himself	Episode: "Pilots and Pens Lost"
1998	HBO Comedy Half-Hour	Himself	Episode: "Dave Chappelle"
2002–2007	Crank Yankers	Francis, Shavin (voice)	2 episodes
2003	Wanda at Large	Vincent	Episode: "The Favor"
2003–2006	Chappelle's Show	Himself (host)	28 episodes; also co-creator, writer, and executive producer
2016–2025	Saturday Night Live	Himself (host)	4 episodes
2025	SNL50: Anniversary Special	Himself	Television special

=== Film ===
Year	Title	Role	Notes
1993	Robin Hood: Men in Tights	Ah-Choo	
1993	Undercover Blues	Ozzie	
1994	Getting In	Ron	
1996	The Nutty Professor	Reggie Warrington	
1996	Joe's Apartment	Cockroach (voice)	
1997	Con Air	Joe "Pinball" Parker	
1997	The Real Blonde	Zee	
1997	Damn Whitey	Dave	Short
1997	Bowl of Pork	Black Forrest Gump	Short
1998	Half Baked	Thurgood Jenkins/Sir Smoke-a-Lot	
1998	Woo	Lenny	
1998	You've Got Mail	Kevin Jackson	
1999	200 Cigarettes	Disco Cabbie	
1999	Blue Streak	Tulley	
2000	Screwed	Rusty P. Hayes	
2002	Undercover Brother	Conspiracy Brother	
2015	Chi-Raq	Morris	
2018	A Star Is Born	George 'Noodles' Stone	

=== Music video ===
Year	Song	Artist	Role
2000	"Oooh."	De La Soul featuring Redman	Doorman

=== Documentary ===
Year	Title
2001	Open Mic
2003	Richard Pryor: I Ain't Dead Yet
2004	Sex and the City: A Farewell
2006	Dave Chappelle's Block Party
2009	Why We Laugh: Black Comedians on Black Comedy
2013	Richard Pryor: Omit the Logic
2017	Def Comedy Jam 25
2018	Quincy
2019	Devil's Pie
2021	The One and Only Dick Gregory
2021	Dave Chappelle: Live in Real Life
2025	Being Eddie

== Discography ==
=== Live albums ===
List of extended plays with selected details
Title	Details
8: 46 (with Amir Sulaiman)	Released: September 3, 2021; Label: Third Man; Format: LP, digital download, streaming

=== Other charted songs ===
List of songs, with selected chart positions, showing year charted and album name
Title	Year	Peak chart positions							Album
Title	Year	US	US R&B /HH	US Rap	AUS	CAN	FRA	WW	Album
"Parasail" (Travis Scott featuring Yung Lean and Dave Chappelle)	2023	54	23	22	91	46	92	55	Utopia
