= William David Chappelle III =

American music professor (1938–1998)

- Born: December 16, 1938; Columbia, South Carolina, U.S.
- Died: July 29, 1998 (aged 59); Yellow Springs, Ohio, U.S.
- Education: Brown University; Antioch College (BA)
- Occupations: Music professor; vocal performance teacher
- Organization: Antioch College
- Spouse: Yvonne Seon
- Children: Dave Chappelle
- Relatives: William D. Chappelle (grandfather); W. D. Chappelle Jr. (uncle)
- Awards: Walter F. Anderson Award

William David Chappelle III (December 16, 1938 – July 29, 1998) was an American professor of music and a civil rights organizer in Ohio. He spent much of his career at Antioch College, where he served as dean of students. He was the father of comedian Dave Chappelle.

== Life and career ==
Chappelle was born on December 16, 1938, in Columbia, South Carolina. He attended Brown University, and then graduated from Antioch College with a Bachelor of Arts in music.

Chappelle served in the United States Army for four years, and played clarinet in the service. After moving to Yellow Springs, Ohio, in 1967, he became a faculty member in the Co-op Department. He then became a professor in the music department, where he mainly taught vocal performance. Chappelle served terms both as dean of students and as Dean of Community Services.

Chappelle was also active as an organizer in the civil rights movement in Ohio. In the 1970s he was a member of the Yellow Springs Human Relations Commission. He was also the co-founder of the advocacy organization H.U.M.A.N., for Help Us Make A Nation, and he was a founder of the African American Cross-Cultural Works. Chappelle taught a class on anti-racist activism at Antioch College. As part of his activism, Chappelle organized the Blues Week in Yellow Springs, Ohio. He also worked for several years on community programs in Washington, D.C., and he worked as a statistician.

In 2010, Chappelle received the Walter F. Anderson Award from the Antioch College Alumni Association, alongside Edythe Scott Bagley and Jim Dunn. The Anderson Award "recognizes contributions by alumni and friends who have advanced Antioch College's ideals by breaking down racial and ethnic barriers".

Chappelle died in July 1998 in Yellow Springs.

William David Chappelle III's grandfather was the educator and bishop William D. Chappelle, and his son is the comedian Dave Chappelle.
