= Edythe Scott Bagley =

American author, activist, and educator (1924–2011)

Edythe Rose Scott-Bagley
- Born: December 13, 1924; Marion, Alabama, U.S.
- Died: June 11, 2011 (aged 86)
- Education: Lincoln Normal School; Antioch College; Ohio State University (BA); Columbia University (MA); Boston University (MFA)
- Occupations: Author, activist, educator
- Known for: Older sister of Coretta Scott King
- Parent(s): Obadiah Scott; Bernice McMurry Scott
- Relatives: Coretta Scott King (sister); Obie Leonard Scott (brother); Arturo Bagley (son); Martin Luther King Jr. (brother-in-law); Yolanda King (niece); Martin Luther King III (nephew); Dexter Scott King (nephew); Bernice King (niece)

Edythe Scott Bagley (December 13, 1924 – June 11, 2011) was an American author, activist, and educator. The older sister of Coretta Scott King, she worked behind the scenes to promote the Civil Rights Movement and was actively involved in many of the crucial events of that era.

In 1943, Mrs. Bagley graduated from Lincoln Normal School in Marion, Alabama. With the encouragement of teachers and mentors, she applied for a scholarship to Antioch College and was accepted as a student there that fall. Though Antioch had enjoyed a long history of racial tolerance, Mrs. Bagley was the first African American student admitted to the school in the modern era. Later, she transferred to Ohio State University from which she graduated. She also earned a master of English from Columbia University and a master of fine arts in theatre arts from Boston University.

== Involvement in sister's family ==
Her sister Coretta met Martin Luther King Jr. while attending the New England Conservatory of Music in Boston after winning a scholarship. Edythe was frequently confronted by her sister over whether or not to develop her relationship with the aspiring minister, and she became impressed by how King carried himself. However, Edythe was approached by King's parents, Martin Luther King Sr. and Alberta Williams King. The two wanted to meet with members of Coretta's family and obtained Edythe's number from her. Mrs. Bagley had lunch with the two, and was pressed by King Sr. over how she felt about her sister possibly marrying his son. Though Edythe tried to assert her sister was deserving of his son and was a strong person, she did not believe that she had to beg. Coretta and Martin made an announcement of their marriage on Valentine's Day 1953. Despite the wedding being only four months away, Coretta was not fully committed to the idea, and sent a letter to her sister the day before Easter Vacation.

After the assassination of her brother-in-law Martin Luther King Jr., Mrs. Bagley moved to Atlanta, Georgia and stayed there for two years to support her sister. In those years, she helped her sister in developing the King Center for Nonviolent Social Change and served on its board of directors for the rest of her life. On Labor Day weekend of 1968, Edythe went to Atlanta to visit her sister and met with her staff for the first time. Edythe represented her sister and her brother-in-law in 1971 when the Police Athletic League dedicated a building its then-newest center to Martin Luther King Jr. and helped in ceremonies at that time as well.

== Personal life ==
Edythe Rose Scott-Bagley was born in Marion, Alabama, to Bernice McMurry-Scott and Obie Scott Sr, as were her siblings, Coretta, Obie Leonard and Eunice. Her parents were leaders in the community. in addition to running the Scott household, Bernice was the church pianist at Mt. Tabor A.M.E Zion Church and she drove the school bus. Obie pursued many jobs, including barbering, transporting timber, and driving a taxi cab. The oldest of the Scott's, Edythe attended crossroad school. Edythe received her secondary education at Lincoln School in nearby Marion, where she was exposed to a faculty that was both racially and geographically diverse with members from New England, New York, and the Midwest as a junior that included an appearance in Yellow Springs, Ohio, home of Antioch College. That exposure led to Antioch's offer of a scholarship, and after graduating from Lincoln as a class valedictorian.

Edythe married Arthur Bagley on June 5, 1954, and had one child named Arturo Bagley. They were married for 56 years.

== Career ==
She taught at several colleges in Alabama and Georgia before joining the faculty of Cheyney University of Pennsylvania in 1971. At Cheyney, Mrs. Bagley founded the theatre arts major in 1980. In conjunction with that program she produced and directed numerous plays and theatrical productions. Edythe remained a part of faculty at the college until her retirement in 1996.

== Later years ==
In 2003, believing her death was near, Edythe called her sister to arrange for the entire family to be together for Thanksgiving. Bagley let her feelings about possibly dying soon be known, to which her niece Bernice King said "Aunt Edythe, it's not over because you're not finished."

Following the death of her sister Coretta in 2006, Mrs. Bagley called her "my best friend and closest associate." At her sister's funeral, Bagley was represented by her son Arturo Bagley, who spoke about the sisters's relationship. Mrs. Bagley's health began to decline in the spring of 2010. In the summer of 2010, alumni of Antioch College honored Edythe with the Walter F. Anderson Award, along with William David Chappelle III and Jim Dunn. In February 2011, Edythe's husband died, and four months later, on June 11, 2011, she died. The day after her death, Mrs. Bagley's nephew Martin Luther King III reported that she had died and called her a "vibrant, brilliant woman and always a source of strength and wisdom for our mother during the difficult challenges of the civil rights movement."

== Published works ==
In 1966, Mrs. Bagley began work on a biography of her sister, Coretta Scott King, detailing their shared experiences growing up in Alabama and Mrs. King's life during the early days of the modern Civil Rights Movement. Over the next two years, she conducted extensive research, gathered family documents, and interviewed countless individuals who had been at the center of the civil rights struggle. That work resulted in a manuscript and after two years of effort, she placed it in the mail to an interested publisher on April 4, 1968, then went home to relax. Later that evening, she learned that her brother-in-law, Dr. Martin Luther King Jr., had been assassinated.

Events in the months that followed overshadowed Mrs. Bagley's manuscript, and it went unpublished. Then shortly before Mrs. King's death, she again encouraged Mrs. Bagley to pick up the project once more. With the assistance of bestselling author Joe Hilley, the manuscript was updated, expanded, and prepared again for publication. After the death of Mrs. Bagley's niece Yolanda King, she mentioned the manuscript to her sister's other daughter Bernice. In April 2012, nearly one year after Mrs. Bagley's death, the book, Desert Rose: The Life and Legacy of Coretta Scott King, was published by the University of Alabama Press.

== See also ==
- List of Cheyney University of Pennsylvania faculty
- List of Columbia University alumni
