= The Dreamer (2023 film) =

2023 American stand-up comedy special

- Directed by: Stan Lathan
- Written by: Dave Chappelle
- Produced by: Sina Sadighi
- Starring: Dave Chappelle
- Production company: Netflix Studios
- Distributed by: Netflix
- Release date: December 31, 2023
- Running time: 56 minutes
- Country: United States

The Dreamer is a 2023 American stand-up comedy special written and performed by Dave Chappelle for Netflix. It was directed by Stan Lathan and recorded at the Lincoln Theatre in Washington, D.C. in 2023.

== Summary ==
The special centres around the importance of inspiration and having a dream. Chappelle draws material from the aftermath of Chappelle's Show ending its run. Chappelle discusses transgender issues, which have previously drawn criticism from the LGBTQ community. He also lampoons the 'slap heard around the world,' when Will Smith slapped Chris Rock at the Academy Awards.

== Music ==
The opening title features the song "Daydreaming" by Radiohead.

== Accolades ==
| Year | Award | Category | Title | Result | Ref. |
|---|---|---|---|---|---|
| 2024 | Primetime Emmy Award | Outstanding Variety Special (Pre-Recorded) | Dave Chappelle, Rikki Hughes, Stan Lathan, and Sina Sadighi | Nominated | |
| 2024 | Primetime Emmy Award | Outstanding Directing for a Variety Special | Stan Lathan | Nominated | |
| 2024 | Directors Guild of America | Outstanding Directing – Variety Specials | Stan Lathan | Nominated | |
| 2024 | Producers Guild of America | Outstanding Producer of Variety, Sketch, Standup & Talk Television | Dave Chappelle, Rikki Hughes, Stan Lathan, and Sina Sadighi | Nominated | |
| 2025 | Grammy Awards | Best Comedy Album | Dave Chappelle | Won | |
