= List of Cheyney University of Pennsylvania faculty =

This is a list of Cheyney University of Pennsylvania faculty.

== Notable faculty ==
Name	Department	Notability	Reference
Edythe Scott Bagley		founder of the theater department; sibling of Coretta Scott King	
Ebenezer Don Carlos Bassett		second principal; first African-American U.S. diplomat	
Edward Bouchet		hired in 1876; first African-American Yale University doctoral graduate	
Octavius Catto		valedictorian in 1858 at the Institute for Colored Youth; taught at Cheyney briefly after graduating; influential in getting the 15th Amendment passed in 1870, which gave black men the right to vote; founder of the first black baseball team in the United States (The Pythians, 1867) and the Equal Rights League (1864)	
John Chaney		1972–82 Hall of Fame basketball coach	
Fanny Jackson Coppin		first African-American woman to become a school principal; was at the Institute for Colored Youth for 37 years; responsible for vast educational improvements in Philadelphia	
Richard Theodore Greener		hired in 1870; first African-American Harvard University graduate	
Leslie Pinckney Hill		faculty 1913–1951; fifth and final principal, first president of Cheyney	
William "Billy" Joe		former NFL and AFL player; College Football Hall of Fame coach	
Mary Jane Patterson		faculty 1862–1869; first African-American woman to receive a bachelor's degree when she graduated from Oberlin College in 1862; taught at ICY in Philadelphia for seven years; in 1869 she moved to Washington, D.C. to teach; in 1871 became the first black principal of the newly established Preparatory High School for Negroes, later renamed Dunbar High School	
Charles L. Reason		first principal; prolific writer of political journalism and poetry; known for poems "Freedom," "The Spirit Voice," and "Silent Thoughts"	
C. Vivian Stringer		1972–83 Hall of Fame basketball coach	
Laura Wheeler Waring		hired in 1908; artist; art and music teacher	
