= Dave Chappelle's Block Party =

- Theatrical release poster
- Directed by: Michel Gondry
- Written by: Dave Chappelle
- Produced by: Dave Chappelle; Michel Gondry
- Starring: Kanye West; Mos Def; Talib Kweli; Common; The Fugees; Dead Prez; Erykah Badu; Jill Scott; The Roots; Dave Chappelle
- Cinematography: Ellen Kuras
- Music by: Corey Smyth
- Production company: Bob Yari Productions
- Distributed by: Rogue Pictures
- Release dates: September 12, 2005 (Toronto International Film Festival); March 3, 2006 (United States)
- Running time: 103 minutes
- Country: United States
- Language: English
- Budget: $3 million
- Box office: $12.1 million

Dave Chappelle's Block Party (also known as Block Party) is a 2005 American documentary-concert film starring comedian Dave Chappelle at the height of his early mainstream success and cultural influence. Directed by Academy Award-winning filmmaker Michel Gondry, the film captures Chappelle organizing a free block party concert in Brooklyn on September 18, 2004, inspired by the 1973 concert documentary Wattstax. Despite intermittent rain, the concert continued uninterrupted, featuring performances from a lineup of hip-hop and R&B artists, including The Fugees in their first reunion since their 1997 breakup, Kanye West, Mos Def, Talib Kweli, Erykah Badu, Jill Scott, The Roots, Common, John Legend, Kool G Rap, and Dead Prez.

The film premiered at the 2005 Toronto International Film Festival before its wide release on March 3, 2006. It was dedicated to the memory of music producer J Dilla, who died from lupus one month before the film's release. Block Party received widespread critical acclaim, praised for its vibrant atmosphere, historic musical moments, and Chappelle's ability to merge comedy with hip-hop culture. The film holds a 92% rating on Rotten Tomatoes and has been recognized by publications such as Rolling Stone, The A.V. Club, and IndieWire as one of the greatest concert films ever made. It is widely recognized for facilitating one of the last major Fugees reunions, often cited as one of hip-hop’s most significant reunions. Artists such as J. Cole have described attending the event as a defining experience.

Filmed at a pivotal moment in Chappelle's career, Block Party was released after he made the decision to leave Chappelle's Show and withdraw from the public eye. The film was a box office success, debuting at #6 in its opening weekend, grossing $6 million from 1,200 theaters, and ultimately earning $12.1 million worldwide against a $3 million budget. Its DVD release sold over 1.24 million copies, generating $18.8 million in revenue. The documentary also earned several accolades, including a Black Reel Award for Outstanding Original Soundtrack.

== Plot ==
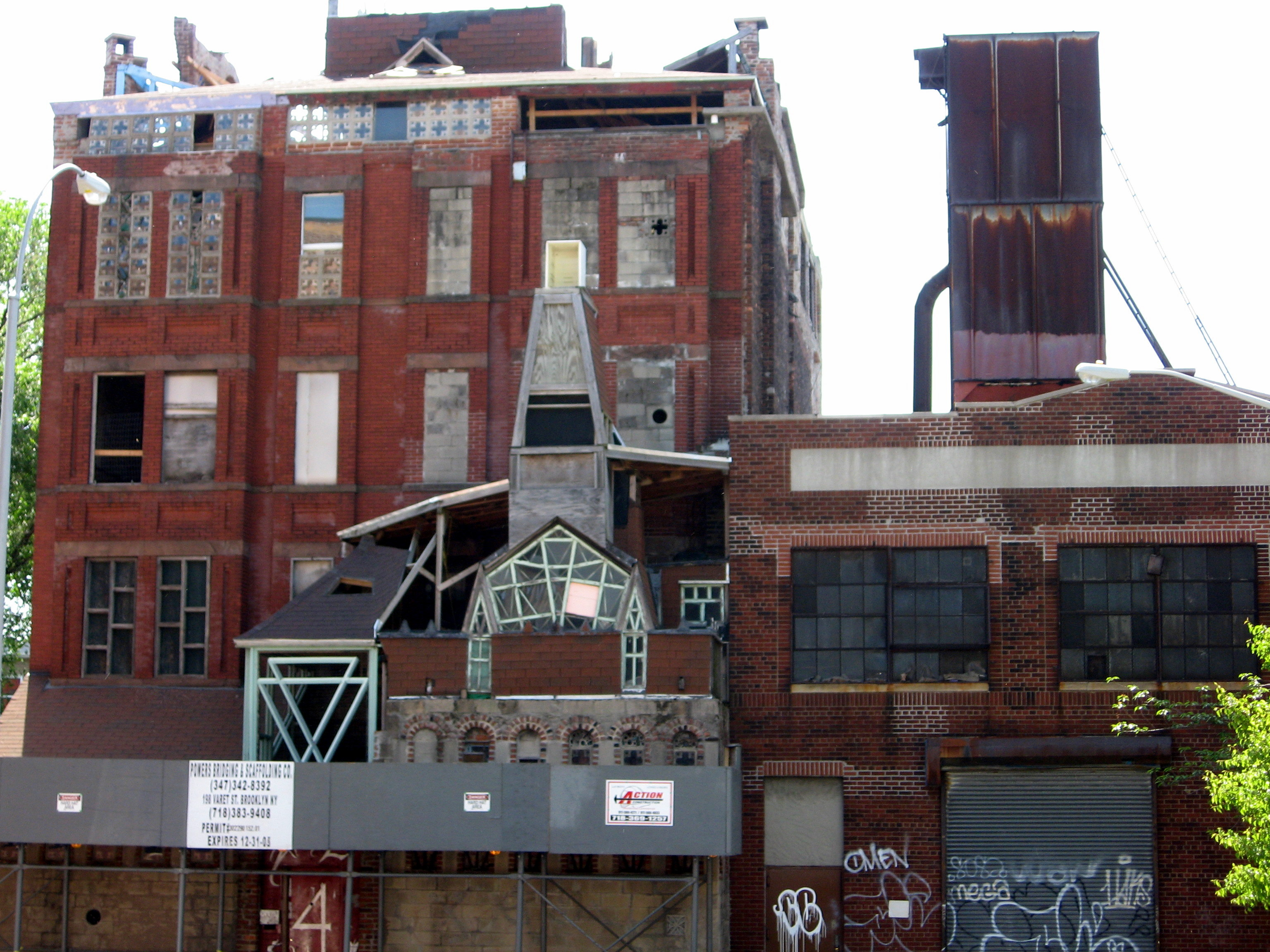
The Broken Angel House, the site of the documentary, in May 2007

The film follows Chappelle during the summer of 2004, ending on September 18, 2004, when he threw a block party on the corner of Quincy Street and Downing Street in the Clinton Hill neighborhood of Brooklyn, New York City. The film features nearby sites, including the Broken Angel House in Clinton Hill, Brooklyn as well as areas in Fort Greene, Brooklyn and Bedford-Stuyvesant, Brooklyn. The film was produced before Chappelle's highly publicized decision to walk away from a $50 million deal to continue his hit Chappelle's Show, and gained prominence after the announcement.

Chappelle invited several hip hop and neo-soul musical artists to perform at the party, including Kanye West, Mos Def, Jill Scott, Erykah Badu, and The Roots along with The Central State University Marching Band. Lauryn Hill was also scheduled to perform at the party, but since Columbia Records refused to release her songs for use in the production, she decided instead to reunite The Fugees for the occasion. In addition, Chappelle performed comedy monologues and sketches in between the musical acts. A pre-fame J. Cole was in attendance and can be seen in the crowd watching the hip hop duo Black Star perform.

== Performers ==
- Dave Chappelle
- Kanye West
- Mos Def
- Talib Kweli
- Jill Scott
- Erykah Badu
- The Roots
- Common
- Big Daddy Kane
- Kool G Rap
- The Fugees
- Bilal
- Dead Prez
- Cody Chesnutt
- John Legend
- Central State University Marching Band
- A-Trak

== Soundtrack ==
Dave Chappelle's Block Party

Live album by Various Artists
- Released: March 14, 2006
- Recorded: September 18, 2004
- Genre: Progressive hip hop; neo soul
- Label: Geffen

Professional ratings
Review scores
Source	Rating
Allmusic	link
The A.V. Club	B−
HipHopDX	3.5/5 link

A compilation of "music from and inspired by" the film was released on March 14, 2006.

The album was released by Geffen Records, and produced by Corey Smyth for Blacksmith Music Corp and Questlove.

1. Dead Prez – "Hip Hop"
2. Black Star – "Definition"
3. Jill Scott – "Golden"
4. Mos Def – "Universal Magnetic"
5. Talib Kweli feat. Erykah Badu – "The Blast"
6. Common feat. Erykah Badu & Bilal – "The Light"
7. The Roots feat. Big Daddy Kane & Kool G Rap – "Boom!"
8. Erykah Badu – "Back in the Day"
9. Jill Scott – "The Way"
10. Mos Def – "UMI Says"
11. The Roots feat. Erykah Badu & Jill Scott – "You Got Me"
12. Black Star – "Born & Raised"

All the songs were recorded live in concert, except "Born & Raised", an exclusive new studio track from Mos Def and Talib Kweli's Black Star. Many performances, including The Fugees' reunion and Kanye West's performance, could not be included due to legal restraints with the groups' record labels.

Songs included in the film but not the compilation include:

- Chappelle's version of Thelonious Monk's "'Round Midnight".
- Cody Chesnutt's song "Parting Ways".

== Release ==
=== Box office ===
The film grossed $11,718,595 in the United States and an additional $333,329 overseas, giving the film a total gross of $12,051,924; based on a $3 million budget, the film was a moderate success. The DVD has sold a total of 1,240,405 copies since 2006, grossing a total of $18,776,445.

=== Critical response ===
Rotten Tomatoes gives the film a 93% rating based on 127 reviews with an average score of 7.70/10. The site's critical consensus reads: "Dave Chappelle's Block Party is a raucous return to the spotlight for the comic, buoyed by witty, infectious humor and outstanding musical performances." Metacritic, which assigns a normalized rating out of 100 to reviews from mainstream critics, gives the film an average score of 84 based on 30 reviews.
