= Joe Hilley =

American novelist

- Born: Joseph H. Hilley; June 29, 1956 (age 70); Birmingham, Alabama, U.S.
- Education: Asbury College; Asbury Theological Seminary; Cumberland School of Law
- Occupation: Author
- Website: www.joehilley.com

Joseph H. Hilley (born June 29, 1956) is a New York Times Best Selling author. He was born in Birmingham, Alabama, and grew up on the Gulf Coast in the town of Grand Bay, Alabama. He is a graduate of Asbury College, Asbury Theological Seminary, and Cumberland School of Law at Samford University.

== Biography ==
Hilley began writing at night while practicing law as a criminal defense attorney. After completing two unpublished manuscripts, he quit the practice of law to concentrate on writing full-time. His first book, Sober Justice (David C. Cook), a legal thriller, was published in 2004. Four more books followed. The novels, which feature a down-and-out attorney named Mike Connolly, became popular in the Southeast, especially along the Gulf Coast where the stories are set.

In 2008, Hilley was tapped to write a leadership biography of former Alaska Governor Sarah Palin. That book, entitled Sarah Palin: A New Kind of Leader (Zondervan), reached The New York Times Best Seller list during the final two weeks of the 2008 presidential election campaign.

Hilley continued to expand his work with non-fiction and in 2011 co-authored The Walk. Part memoir, part instruction, the book was co-written with former NFL running back Shaun Alexander. In 2012, he assisted Edythe Scott Bagley, sister of Coretta Scott King, in writing Desert Rose: The Life and Legacy of Coretta Scott King, a memoir of the sisters and their involvement in the Civil Rights Movement.

During the COVID-19 Pandemic, Hilley spent a year of isolation delving into number theory. The result of that effort was summarized in Observations Regarding Non-Prime Odd Numbers, released in 2021 by Dunlavy Gray.

Nevertheless, the primary focus of his career has remained with fiction. Beginning in 2017, his original novels, the Mike Connolly mystery series, were reissued in print and as eBooks. During that same time, he released two works of general fiction (What the Red Moon Knows and The Art Dealer's Wife) and a collection of short stories (The Legend of Dell Briggers).

== Published works ==
=== Mike Connolly Mysteries ===
1. Sober Justice (2004, reissued 2017)
2. Double Take (2005, reissued 2019)
3. Electric Beach (2006, reissued 2021)
4. Night Rain (2007, reissued 2021)
5. The Deposition (2007, reissued 2021)
6. Sunset Motel (2022)

=== General fiction ===
1. What The Red Moon Knows (2018)
2. The Art Dealer's Wife (2020)
3. Kipling Park (2023)
4. Winter Hill Farm (2023)

=== Short stories ===
1. Edgar's List, included in the 2006 anthology Heartwarming Christmas Stories
2. The Legend of Dell Briggers - A Novella and Two Short Stories, (2020)
3. Other People, Other Places - A Collection of Short Fiction, (2021)

=== Non-fiction ===
1. Sarah Palin: A New Kind of Leader (2008)
2. The Walk, co-written with former NFL running-back Shaun Alexander, (2011)
3. Desert Rose: The Life and Legacy of Coretta Scott King, written with Edythe Scott Bagley, sister of civil rights leader Coretta Scott King. (2012)
4. Observations Regarding Non-Prime Odd Numbers (2021)
