= Yvonne Seon =

American professor, university administrator, and minister

- Born: Yvonne Reed; December 20, 1937 (age 88); Washington, D.C., U.S.
- Education: Allegheny College; American University; Union Institute & University; Howard University
- Spouse: William David Chappelle III
- Children: 3, including Dave Chappelle
- Scientific career
- Fields: African studies; African American studies; American government
- Workplaces: United States Department of State; Wilberforce University; Wright State University; Prince George's Community College

Yvonne Seon (née Reed, formerly Chappelle; born December 20, 1937) is an American professor, university administrator, and Unitarian Universalist minister. She specializes in African studies, African American studies, and government administration. She was an administrative officer in the government of Patrice Lumumba in the Democratic Republic of the Congo, and also worked in the U.S. federal government. She then worked as a university administrator and founded a Black Studies Center at Wright State University, and helped to design one of the first doctoral programs in Black Studies in the United States. In 1981 Seon became the first African American woman to be ordained as a Unitarian Universalist minister.

== Early life and education ==
Seon was born Yvonne Reed, and graduated from Allegheny College with a bachelor's degree in 1959. She then received a Woodrow Wilson Fellowship to attend American University, where she studied American government, political science, and French, earning a master's degree.

== Government work ==
Seon met an assistant of Patrice Lumumba at a reception in Washington, D.C., shortly after Lumumba's 1960 election as prime minister of the newly independent Democratic Republic of the Congo. Because of her fluent French and formal education in politics, she was invited to meet with Lumumba, who offered her a role in his cabinet. Seon accepted the position and moved to the Democratic Republic of the Congo, where she lived for two years, from 1961 to 1963. During that time she served as an administrative officer on the High Commission for the Inga Dam, which was the highest governmental role that could be held by somebody who was not a national of the Democratic Republic of the Congo.

Upon her return to the United States in 1963, Seon began working in the Office of International Conferences at the Bureau of International Organization Affairs within the United States Department of State. In that role she was named the secretary of the delegation to the Fourteenth General Assembly of UNESCO, becoming the youngest person, first African-American, and second woman to be secretary of a major US delegation to that body.

== Academic and religious career ==
In the late 1960s, Seon married William David Chappelle III and moved to Yellow Springs, Ohio. In 1968 she began to work as the coordinator of student affairs at Wilberforce University, which was a fraught position due to the centrality of university students to the protests of 1968. She left this position in 1971 to become the founding director of the Bolinga Black Cultural Resources Center at Wright State University. In 1970 Seon became a PhD student at Union Institute & University studying African and African American humanities, and she completed her doctoral degree in 1974. This was one of the earliest Black Studies PhD programs in the United States, and while a student in the program, Seon also helped to establish and design it. Also in 1974, Seon and Chappelle III separated, and she moved to Washington, D.C., where she worked with congressman Charles Diggs.

From 1979 to 1981, Seon studied divinity at Howard University. She was ordained as a minister in the Unitarian Universalist Church in 1981. This made her the first African American woman to be a Unitarian Universalist minister. In the 1990s, she founded and was the minister of a Unitarian Universalist congregation.

After completing her PhD in African American studies, Seon became a professor in the history department of Prince George's Community College. She retired from Prince George's Community College in 2006, and returned to the Bolinga Black Cultural Resources Center at Wright State University, where she was first Distinguished Visiting Director and then became fulltime director for 2 years.

== Personal life ==
Seon has three children, one of whom is comedian Dave Chappelle.

== Selected works ==
- Totem Games: Poems in Search of African Identity (2007)

== Selected awards ==
- African Scientific Institute award
- Gold Citation, Allegheny College (2009)
