= Broken Angel House =

Building in Brooklyn, New York (demolished 2014)

Coordinates: 40°41′08.3″N 73°57′41.3″W

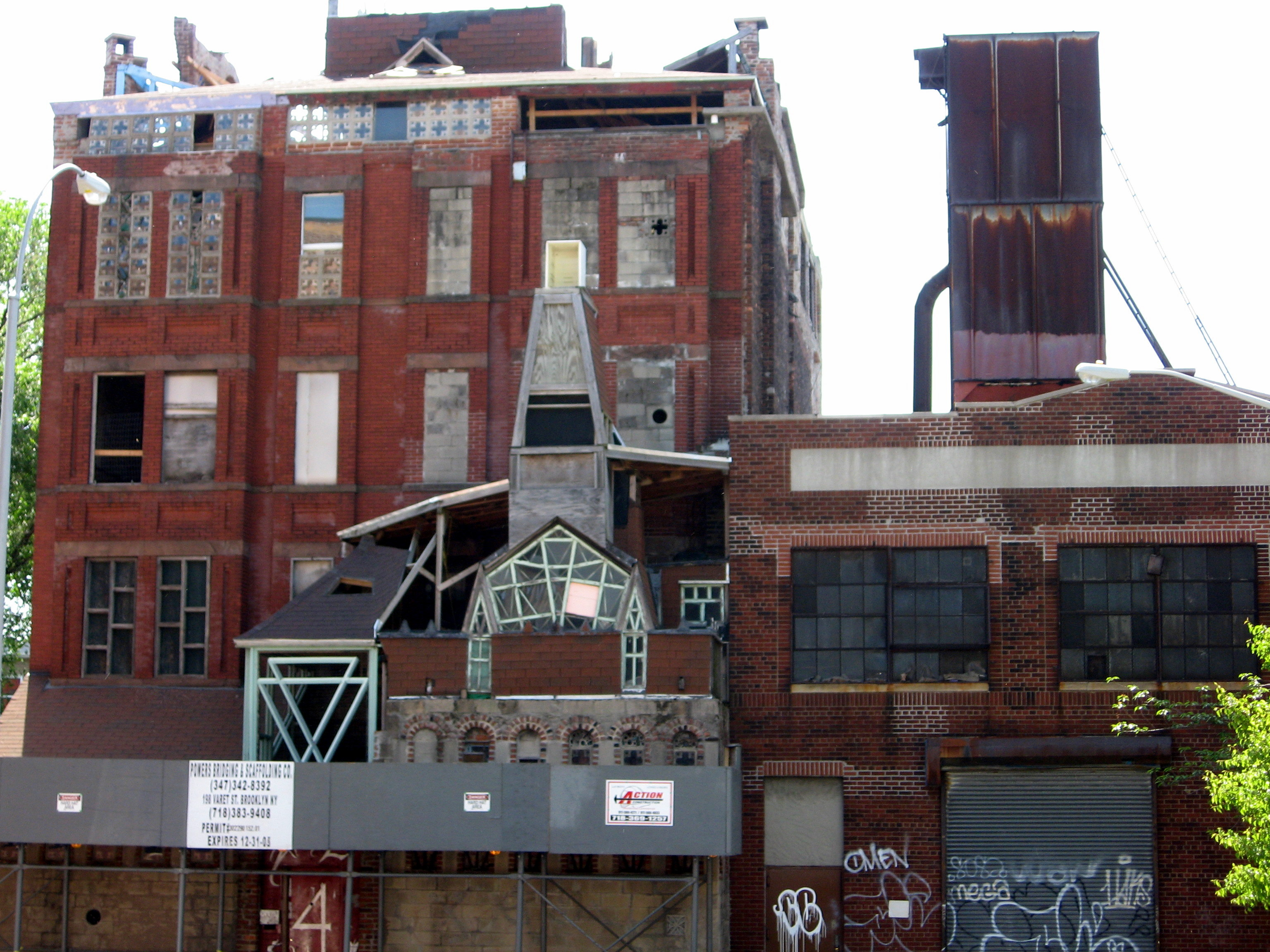
The Broken Angel House in May 2007

Broken Angel or the Broken Angel House was a building located at 4–6 Downing Street in the Clinton Hill neighborhood of Brooklyn, New York, at the intersection of Downing and Quincy street. The house was featured prominently as a backdrop in the film Dave Chappelle's Block Party and was demolished in 2014.

== Design ==
Artists Arthur and Cynthia Wood built the top part of the structure in the 27 years that they were owners of the building. Arthur had a camera obscura on the top area and a room that looked like it floated in the air. The inside was like a huge cathedral with arches and colorful "stained glass windows" that were made from the remains of bottles and glass.

== History ==
Brooklyn artist Arthur Wood purchased the 4-story brick tenement building in 1979 for $2,000. He lived in the house with his wife Cynthia, his son Christopher, who is now a stone carver, and his daughter Elizabeth. The artist explored ideas about design and vernacular architecture with improvised construction to add new floors and rooms to the original building, to the point where the structure reached 104 feet, or about 9 stories above the sidewalk. The site has been compared to Watts Towers in Los Angeles for the ad hoc construction and is acknowledged for its value as folk art and as part of the cultural heritage.

As a result of a fire on October 10, 2006, the New York City Department of Buildings declared the building dangerous, telling Arthur and Cynthia that they had to go. A couple of days later police arrived, cordoned off Downing Street and had battering rams ready to strike down the door. When Arthur defied the vacate order by staying in the building, he was arrested. The police also arrested Cynthia who was outside with their dog Jack. Arthur and Cynthia were taken away in handcuffs and kept at the precinct for many hours. Arthur and his wife and pets lived in a car outside their own building during the cold winter months that followed.

On January 11, 2007 it was announced that Arthur Wood had partnered with local real estate developer Shahn Christian Andersen to renovate Broken Angel, build a new addition to its side, and convert the building to residential condominiums and artist space.

Despite the Woods' efforts the house was a square box, and the plans to renovate it under the direction of Shahn Christian Andersen were never completed. Faced with a foreclosure from Madison Realty Bank, and Cynthia being diagnosed with cancer, the Woods struggled to fight the foreclosure and get their house back. Cynthia Wood died at the age of 72.

=== Demolition ===
In January 2009, the house was put on the market by owner Arthur Wood for $4 million and banks filed for foreclosure on the development loans. The site (including the house), was bought by developer Alex Barrett in January 2014 who paid $4.1 million for the structure; he plans to convert the site into an eight-unit condominium building, with a brand new two-unit building next door at 8 Downing Street. Demolition of the house began in April 2014. By May 2014 the structure was completely demolished.

== Featured in movies ==
The Broken Angel House has a small story segment in the movie Dave Chapelle's Block Party.
