= Robert John Palmer =

American tailor and South Carolinian politician (1849-1928)

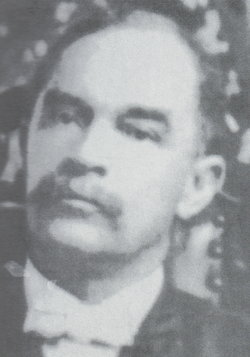

Member of the South Carolina House of Representatives
- In office 1876–1878

Personal details
- Born: January 18, 1849 South Carolina, U.S.
- Died: May 12, 1928 (aged 79) New York, New York, U.S.
- Resting place: Randolph Cemetery
- Spouse: Julia Simons
- Children: 9
- Relatives: Dave Chappelle (great-great-grandson)

Robert John Palmer (born January 18, 1849 – May 12, 1928) was a tailor and politician born into slavery in South Carolina.

== Career ==
Palmer was a state representative from 1876 to 1878 and had a tailor shop opposite the post office on Main Street in Columbia, South Carolina.

== Personal life ==
He had a daughter, Rosina C. Palmer, with Julia Simons in Columbia in the 1870s. He subsequently married Adelaide Perry and had eight children. After Adelaide died he married Leila P. Bruce January 12, 1913.

He is the great-great-grandfather of stand-up comedian Dave Chappelle.

He is buried in Randolph Cemetery along with eight other Reconstruction Era legislators.

== See also ==
- African American officeholders from the end of the Civil War until before 1900

== Notes ==
1. There are multiple reported birth and death dates of Palmer all within the same month.
