= W. D. Chappelle Jr. =

American physician and surgeon

W. D. Chappelle Jr
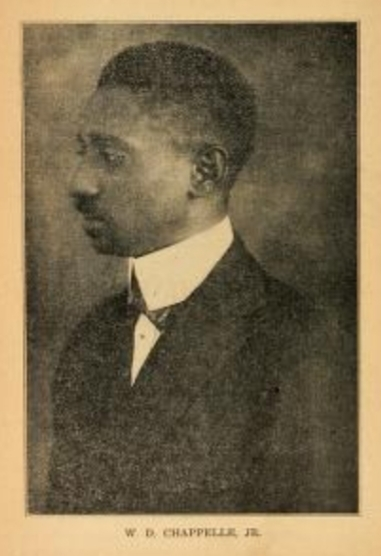
- Dr. CC
- Born: October 19, 1888
- Died: March 7, 1957 (aged 68)
- Occupations: physician and surgeon

William David Chappelle Jr. (October 19, 1888 – March 7, 1957) was an American physician and surgeon in South Carolina who opened the People's Infirmary, a hospital and surgery practice for African Americans in Columbia, South Carolina, in 1914. At the time, segregation prevented many African Americans from having access to healthcare.

He graduated with his M.D. from Leonard Medical College at Shaw University in 1913. He received his medical license in 1914, one of the 18 out of 44 applicants who passed.

W. D. Chappelle was his father. He is comedian Dave Chappelle's grand-uncle.
