= San Miguel =

San Miguel, Spanish for Saint Michael, may refer to:

== Places ==
=== Argentina ===
- San Miguel Partido
- San Miguel, Buenos Aires
- San Miguel, Catamarca
- San Miguel, Corrientes
- San Miguel, La Rioja
- San Miguel Arcángel, a Volga German colony in Adolfo Alsina Partido, Buenos Aires Province
- San Miguel del Monte
- San Miguel Department, Corrientes
- San Miguel de Tucumán

=== Belize ===
- San Miguel, a village in Toledo District

=== Bolivia ===
- San Miguel de Velasco
- San Miguel del Bala, a little community in the rainforest on the Beni River, near Rurrenabaque

=== Brazil ===
- São Miguel das Missões, a municipality in Rio Grande do Sul state, southern Brazil

=== Chile ===
- San Miguel, Chile, in Santiago

=== Colombia ===
- San Miguel, Putumayo, a town and municipality in the Putumayo Department
- San Miguel, Santander, a town and municipality in the Santander Department
- San Miguel de Sema, a town and municipality in the Boyacá Department

=== Costa Rica ===
- San Miguel District, Naranjo

=== Cuba ===
- San Miguel del Padrón, a town and municipality in Havana

=== Ecuador ===
- San Miguel, Bolívar
- San Miguel de Ibarra
- San Miguel de Salcedo
- San Miguel de los Bancos

=== El Salvador ===
- San Miguel (volcano)
- San Miguel Department (El Salvador)
- San Miguel, El Salvador, capital of the forementioned department

=== Guatemala ===
- San Miguel Acatán
- San Miguel Chicaj
- San Miguel Dueñas
- San Miguel Ixtahuacán
- San Miguel Panán
- San Miguel Sigüilá

=== Mexico ===
==== Oaxaca, Mexico ====
- San Miguel Achiutla
- San Miguel Ahuehuetitlán
- San Miguel Aloápam
- San Miguel Amatitlán
- San Miguel Amatlán
- San Miguel Chicahua
- San Miguel Chimalapa
- San Miguel Coatlán
- San Miguel del Puerto
- San Miguel del Río
- San Miguel Ejutla
- San Miguel El Grande
- San Miguel Huautla
- San Miguel Mixtepec
- San Miguel Panixtlahuaca
- San Miguel Peras
- San Miguel Piedras
- San Miguel Quetzaltepec
- San Miguel Santa Flor
- San Miguel Soyaltepec
- San Miguel Suchixtepec
- San Miguel Tecomatlán
- San Miguel Tenango
- San Miguel Tequixtepec
- San Miguel Tilquiapam
- San Miguel Tlacamama
- San Miguel Tlacotepec
- San Miguel Tulancingo
- San Miguel Yotao

==== Other places in Mexico ====
- San Miguel, Quintana Roo, the biggest city on the island Cozumel
- San Miguel de Allende, Guanajuato
- San Miguel de Horcasitas, in the state of Sonora
- San Miguel el Alto, in the state of Jalisco
- San Miguel Totocuitlapilco, in the State of México
- San Miguel Totolapan, in the state of Guerrero
- Misión San Miguel Arcángel de la Frontera, a Spanish Dominican mission in Ensenada, Baja California
- San Miguel (Mexibús), a BRT in Chimalhuacán

=== Panama ===
- Bay of San Miguel
- San Miguel, Los Santos
- San Miguel, Panamá Province

=== Paraguay ===
- San Miguel, Paraguay, a district of the Misiones Department

=== Peru ===
- San Miguel, La Mar Province, capital of the La Mar province
- San Miguel District, Lima, a district in western Lima
- San Miguel Province, a province in the Cajamarca region
- San Miguel de Piura, the capital of the Piura province

=== Philippines ===
- San Miguel, former name of Cebu
- San Miguel Bay
- San Miguel Island (Philippines)
- San Miguel, Bohol
- San Miguel, Bulacan
- San Miguel, Catanduanes
- San Miguel, Iloilo
- San Miguel, Manila
- San Miguel, Leyte
- San Miguel, Gandara, Samar
- San Miguel, Surigao del Sur
- San Miguel, Zamboanga del Sur
- San Miguel, Tarlac

=== Portugal ===
- São Miguel Island, the largest and most populous island in the Portuguese archipelago of the Azores

=== Spain ===
- San Miguel de Abona, in the province of Santa Cruz de Tenerife
- San Miguel de Aguayo, Cantabria, in the autonomous community of Cantabria
- San Miguel de Bernuy, in the province of Segovia
- San Miguel de Corneja, in the province of Ávila
- San Miguel de la Ribera, in the province of Zamora
- San Miguel de Salinas, in the province of Alicante
- San Miguel de Serrezuela, in the province of Ávila
- San Miguel de Valero, in the province of Salamanca
- San Miguel del Arroyo, in the province of Valladolid
- San Miguel del Cinca, in the province of Huesca
- San Miguel del Pino, in the province of Valladolid
- San Miguel del Robledo, in the province of Salamanca
- San Miguel del Valle, in the province of Zamora

=== United States ===
- San Miguel, Arizona, census designated place
- San Miguel, original name given to San Diego, California, in 1542
- San Miguel, Contra Costa County, California, census designated place
- San Miguel, San Luis Obispo County, California, census designated place
  - Mission San Miguel Arcángel, in the above
- San Miguel de los Noches, California, former settlement in Kern County
- San Miguel Island, the westernmost of California's Channel Islands
- San Miguel, New Mexico
- San Miguel County, Colorado
- San Miguel County, New Mexico
- San Miguel River (Colorado)

== Churches ==
- San Miguel, Córdoba, Andalusia, Spain
- Church of San Miguel (Cogolludo), Castile-La Mancha, Spain
- Church of San Miguel (Jerez de la Frontera), Andalusia, Spain
- Church of San Miguel, Mota del Cuervo, Cuenca, Spain
- Church of San Miguel (Vitoria), Basque Country, Spain
- Church of the Monastery of San Miguel de Bárcena, Asturias, Spain
- San Miguel Mission, Santa Fe, New Mexico
- San Miguel de Socorro, Socorro, New Mexico
- San Miguel Arcángel Church (Cabo Rojo), Puerto Rico
- San Miguel Arcangel Church (Marilao), Bulacan, Philippines
- San Miguel Arcangel Church (Masantol), Pampanga, Philippines
- San Miguel Arcangel Church (San Miguel, Bulacan), Philippines

== Ships ==
- SS San Miguel, a ship
- San Miguel, a 28-gun Spanish ship captured by the Royal Navy and renamed Coventry
- Spanish galleon San Miguel, a treasure ship
- Spanish ship San Miguel (1773), a 74-gun ship of the line

== Forts ==
- Fort San Miguel, Vancouver Island, Canada
- Fuerte de San Miguel (Campeche), Mexico; see timeline of Campeche City
- Fuerte San Miguel (Uruguay)

== Food and beverage ==
- Ginebra San Miguel, a Filipino beverage company and namesake gin brand
- San Miguel Beer (disambiguation)
- San Miguel Brewery, a Philippine brewery
- San Miguel Corporation, a Philippine food, beverage and packaging company

== Sport ==
- Barangay Ginebra San Miguel, a professional basketball team in the Philippines
- San Miguel Beermen, a professional basketball team in the Philippines playing in the Philippine Basketball Association
- San Miguel Beermen (ABL), a professional basketball team in the Philippines that played in the ASEAN Basketball League

== Music ==
- "San Miguel" (song), recorded by The Beach Boys
- "San Miguel", recorded by the Kingston Trio and Lonnie Donegan (among others)

== See also ==
- Saint Michael (disambiguation)
- San Michele (disambiguation)
- San Miguel Beer (disambiguation)
- San Miguel River (disambiguation)
- San Miguel de Aguayo (disambiguation)
- São Miguel (disambiguation)
