= Spanish ship San Miguel =

Spanish ship San Miguel may refer to the following ships:

- English ship Coventry (1658), originally San Miguel before being captured
- Spanish galleon San Miguel, shipwrecked in 1551
- Spanish ship San Miguel (1773), a 74-gun ship of the line

== See also ==
- SS San Miguel
- San Miguel (disambiguation)
