= Jaltepetongo =

Jaltepetongo may refer to:

- San Francisco Jaltepetongo, Oaxaca
- San Pedro Jaltepetongo, Oaxaca
