= San Miguel (1551 shipwreck) =

San Miguel may refer to any of a number of Spanish ships.

The San Miguel which sank in the 1551 off Santo Domingo is believed to be one of the richest treasure galleons ever lost at sea, with a cargo of Inca and Aztec treasures looted by Spanish conquistadors.

== San Miguel (sank 1551) ==
A fleet of nine ships left San Juan de Ulúa, Mexico, on March 15, 1551. By April 29, the San Miguel had wrecked off the north coast of Santo Domingo, with no lives lost. Some of the registered treasure appears to have been salvaged in the following months and was sent to Spain. The ship was 200 toneladas, and was considered to be an excellent vessel, the best of the fleet. It would have been about 23 meters long, with a keel of nearly 15 meters.

Many people have searched for the remains of the San Miguel. The search was mentioned in the final chapters of Robert Kurson's "Pirate Hunters" (2015), a New York Times Bestseller, when John Chatterton and John Mattera, the divers who found the pirate ship Golden Fleece, were close on the trail of the San Miguel, after a decade of searching. John Mattera is an archival historian who searched the Archive of the Indies in Seville, Spain, as well as the historical records of Jack Haskins to locate the area the San Miguel sank. Chatterton and Mattera then spent the next years narrowing down the lost ship's location. The search is ongoing in the treacherous waters of the Dominican Republic.

== See also ==
Another galleon of the same name sank in the 1540s. See:

- List of shipwrecks in the 16th century
