= São Miguel River =

There are several rivers named São Miguel River in Brazil:

- São Miguel River (Alagoas)
- São Miguel River (Espírito Santo)
- São Miguel River (Minas Gerais)
- São Miguel River (Rondônia)

== See also ==
- São Miguel (disambiguation)
- San Miguel River (disambiguation)
