= Huautla =

Huautla could mean any of the following locations in Mexico:

- Huautla, Hidalgo in central-eastern Mexico
- Huautla, Morelos in South-Central Mexico
- Sierra de Huautla, a mountain range in south-central Mexico
- Huautla de Jiménez, Oaxaca
- San Miguel Huautla, Oaxaca
- Sistema Huautla, Oaxaca, the deepest cave system in the Western Hemisphere
