= Rocket Men (book) =

2018 book about the Apollo 8 mission

- Cover design of Rocket Men
- Author: Robert Kurson
- Language: English
- Subject: Apollo 8
- Genre: Non-fiction
- Publisher: Random House (US); Scribe (UK)
- Publication date: 3 April 2018
- Publication place: United States
- Media type: Print, digital
- Pages: 336 pp (hardcover)
- ISBN: 978-0812988703
- Preceded by: Pirate Hunters

Rocket Men: The Daring Odyssey of Apollo 8 and the Astronauts Who Made Man's First Journey to the Moon is a 2018 nonfiction book by Robert Kurson recounting NASA's 1968 Apollo 8 mission, which was the first crewed spacecraft to reach the Moon and return safely to Earth. The book is Kurson's fourth, and it debuted on the New York Times bestseller list.

== Background ==
Kurson drew on hundreds of hours of one-on-one interviews with NASA staff, industry experts, astronauts (including all three Apollo 8 astronauts) and their families as source material for the book.

== Synopsis ==
Rocket Men is an account of the Apollo 8 mission with focus on Frank Borman, Jim Lovell and William Anders, the three astronauts who flew the mission. The book also places an emphasis on the astronauts' families during the mission.

From The Washington Post:

"'Rocket Men' opens in summer 1968, with the space race in high gear. The Soviet Union had already put the world’s first satellite, Sputnik, as well as the first human, Yuri Gagarin, into Earth’s orbit. The Soviets were projected to reach the moon by the end of the year, months ahead of the United States."

The book includes chapters dedicated to each astronaut, the Space Race itself, and background and chronological progress of the mission including critical maneuvers and mission setbacks. It is set against the backdrop of 1968, considered by many to be among the most divisive and violent years in American history.

== Reception ==
The book reached #7 on the New York Times bestseller list and has received positive reviews from critics. The USA Today called Rocket Men a "first-rate account of this remarkable spaceflight" and added, "There are many pieces to the Apollo 8 story, but Kurson brings them together effortlessly." The New York Times called the book "gripping" and "a riveting introduction to the [Apollo 8] flight" in which "Kurson details the mission in crisp, suspenseful scenes." Writing for The Washington Post, Mary Roach compared the book to Alfred Lansing's 1959 book Endurance and Jon Krakauer's 1997 Into Thin Air, and called Kurson's writing style "as close to a movie as writing gets."

The film rights to Rocket Men were secured by Makeready prior to the book's publication.
