= SMB1 =

SMB1 may refer to:

- Super Mario Bros., a 1985 video game
- Server Message Block version 1, a network protocol

== See also ==
- SMB (disambiguation)
