= San Mateo Etlatongo =

- Municipality and town
- Location in Mexico
- Coordinates: 17°25′N 97°16′W
- Country: Mexico
- State: Oaxaca

Area
  - Total: 24.40 km^{2} (9.42 sq mi)

Population (2005)
  - Total: 1,085
- Time zone: UTC-6 (Central Standard Time)

San Mateo Etlatongo is a town and municipality in Oaxaca in south-western Mexico. The municipality covers an area of 24.40 km^{2}. It is part of the Nochixtlán District in the southeast of the Mixteca Region.

As of 2005, the municipality had a total population of 1,085.

== See also ==
- Etlatongo (archaeological site)
