= Etlatongo =

Coordinates: 17°26′15″N 97°18′0″W

Orange-on-white pottery from Etlatongo, identified through neutron activation analysis as originating in the Olmec site of San Lorenzo Tenochtitlán.© Jeffrey Blomster

Etlatongo is an archaeological site in Oaxaca, Mexico. Situated in the Nochixtlán Valley within the Mixteca Alta, Etlatongo encompasses both a Formative Period site, located between two rivers, and a Classic/Post-classic site, on a hill to the north.

Etlatongo experienced a sharp population growth beginning in roughly 1150 BCE and lasting for 300 years. It was during this period that trade goods, including figurines, ceramics, and obsidian, including artifacts identified with the Zapotecs, Olmecs, and the Valley of Mexico, enter the archaeological record.

Studies of Etlatongo artifacts, including obsidian and pottery, indicate that Etlatongo participated in a wide-ranging trade network. Etlatongo continued to be occupied through the Post-classic period.

In 2020, a ballcourt was discovered at Etlatongo, dating to 1374 BCE.

== See also ==
- San Mateo Etlatongo (town and municipality in Oaxaca)

== Bibliography ==
- Blomster, Jeffrey (2000), "Etlatongo (Oaxaca, Mexico)" in Evans, Susan, Archaeology of Ancient Mexico and Central America, Taylor & Francis.
- Blomster, Jeffrey (2003), Etlatongo: Social Complexity, Interaction, and Village Life in the Mixteca Alta of Oaxaca, Mexico, Wadsworth Publishing, Case Studies in Archaeology Series.
- Blomster, Jeffrey, "Diachronic and Synchronic Analyses of Obsidian Procurement in the Mixteca Alta, Oaxaca", Foundation for the Advancement of Mesoamerican Studies (FAMSI), accessed February 2006.
