= Santo Domingo Nuxaá =

Coordinates: 17°13′N 97°07′W

- Municipality and town
- Interactive map of Santo Domingo Nuxaá
- Country: Mexico
- State: Oaxaca
- Time zone: UTC-6 (Central Standard Time)

Santo Domingo Nuxaá is a town and municipality in Oaxaca in south-western Mexico. The municipality covers an area of km^{2}. It is part of the Nochixtlán District in the southeast of the Mixteca Region.

As of 2005, the municipality had a total population of .
