= Santa Inés de Zaragoza =

- Municipality and town
- Location in Mexico
- Coordinates: 17.6333°N 97.1°W
- Country: Mexico
- State: Oaxaca
- Time zone: UTC-6 (Central Standard Time)

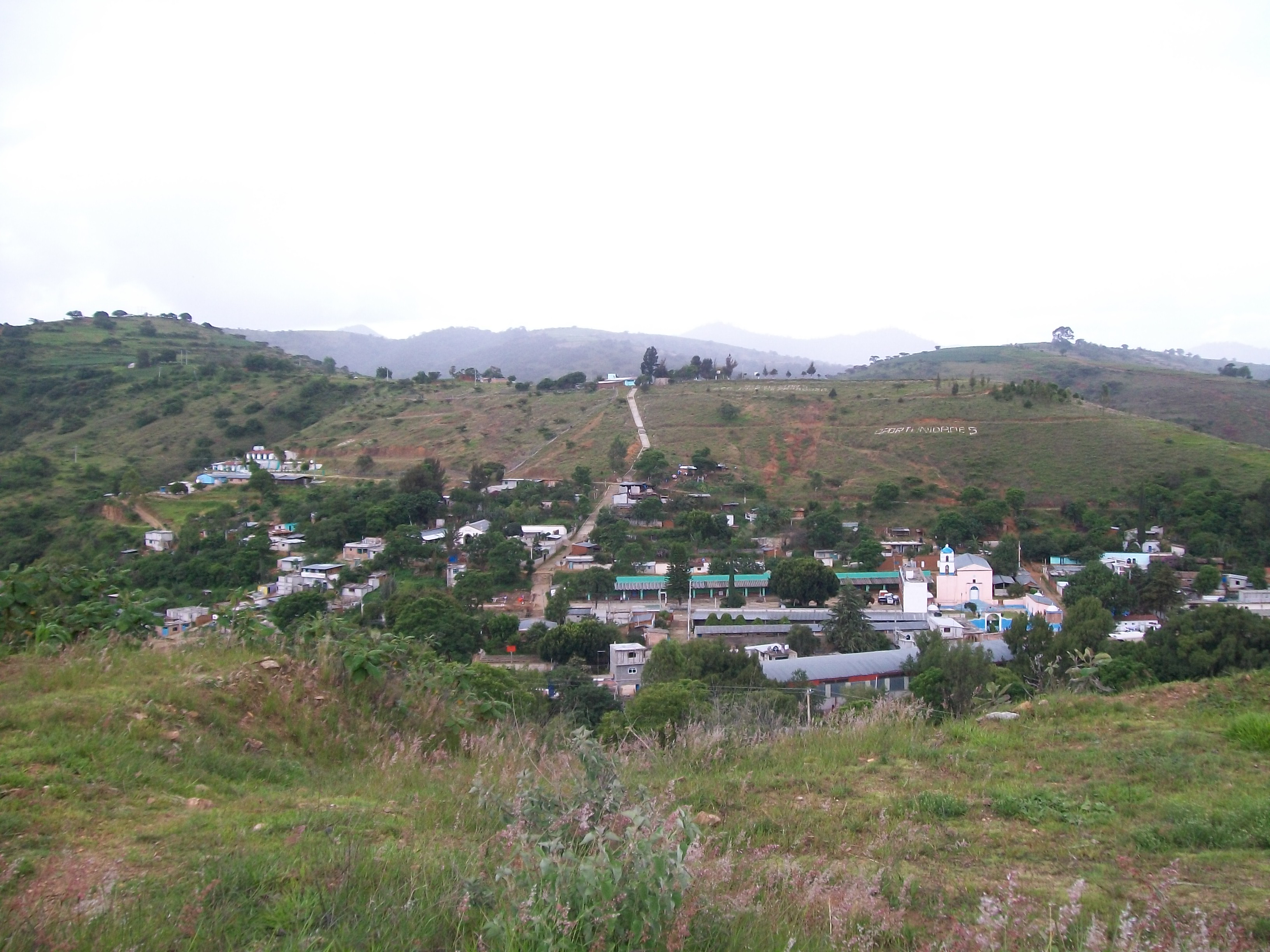
Panoramic view of Santa Inés de Zaragoza, Oaxaca, as it appeared in 2010. This small municipality, part of the Nochixtlán District in the Mixteca Region, is known for its rolling hills and rural landscapes, reflecting the rich cultural and historical heritage of southwestern Mexico.

Santa Inés de Zaragoza is a town and municipality in Oaxaca in south-western Mexico. The municipality covers an area of km^{2}. It is part of the Nochixtlán District in the southeast of the Mixteca Region.
