= San Andrés Nuxiño =

- Municipality and town
- Location in Mexico
- Coordinates: 17°14′N 97°06′W
- Country: Mexico
- State: Oaxaca

Area
  - Total: 84.2 km^{2} (32.5 sq mi)

Population (2005)
  - Total: 1,983
- Time zone: UTC-6 (Central Standard Time)

San Andrés Nuxiño is a town and municipality in Oaxaca in south-western Mexico. The municipality covers an area of 84.2 km^{2}. It is part of the Nochixtlán District in the southeast of the Mixteca Region.

In 2005, the municipality had a total population of 1,983.
