= São Miguel =

São Miguel (Portuguese for Saint Michael) is the name of the largest island of the Azores and may also refer to:

== Places ==
=== Brazil ===
- São Miguel, Rio Grande do Norte, a municipality in the State of Rio Grande do Norte
- Barra de São Miguel, Alagoas, a municipality in the State of Alagoas
- Barra de São Miguel, Paraíba, a municipality in the State of Paraíba
- São Miguel do Aleixo, a municipality in the State of Sergipe
- São Miguel do Anta, a municipality in the State of Mina Gerais
- São Miguel do Araguaia, a municipality in the State of Goiás
- São Miguel Arcanjo, Brazil, a municipality in the State of São Paulo
- São Miguel da Baixa Grande, a municipality in the State of Piauí
- São Miguel da Boa Vista, a municipality in the State of Santa Catarina
- São Miguel dos Campos, a municipality in the State of Alagoas
- São Miguel do Fidalgo, a municipality in the State of Piauí
- São Miguel do Gostoso, a municipality in the State of Rio Grande do Norte
- São Miguel do Guamá, a municipality in the State of Pará
- São Miguel do Guaporé, a municipality in the State of Rondônia
- São Miguel do Iguaçu, a municipality in the State of Paraná
- São Miguel das Matas, a municipality in the State of Bahia
- São Miguel dos Milagres, a municipality in the State of Alagoas
- São Miguel das Missões (city), a town in the State of Rio Grande do Sul

- São Miguel das Missões, a Jesuit Mission and UNESCO Heritage Site near the city of the same name

- São Miguel do Oeste, a municipality in the State of Santa Catarina
- São Miguel do Passa Quatro, a municipality in the State of Goiás
- Subprefecture of São Miguel Paulista, São Paulo
- São Miguel Paulista (district of São Paulo), a district in the subprefecture of the same name in the city of São Paulo, Brazil
- São Miguel de Taipu, a municipality in the State of Paraíba
- São Miguel do Tapuio, a municipality in the State of Piauí
- São Miguel do Tocantins, a municipality in the State of Tocantins

=== Cape Verde ===
- São Miguel, Cape Verde, a municipality on the island of Santiago

=== Portugal ===
- São Miguel do Mato (Arouca), a civil parish in the municipality of Arouca
- São Miguel do Rio Torto, a civil parish in the municipality of Abrantes
- Sobral de São Miguel, a civil parish in the municipality of Covilhã
- São Miguel (Lisbon), a civil parish in the municipality of Lisbon
- São Miguel (Penela), a civil parish in the municipality of Penela
- São Miguel do Mato (Vouzela), a civil parish in the municipality of Vouzela
- An alternative name for the civil parish of Vilar de Perdizes in the municipality of Montalegre

In the archipelago of the Azores

- São Miguel Island, located in the Eastern Group, and largest island
- São Miguel (Vila Franca do Campo), a civil parish in the municipality of Vila Franca do Campo, island of São Miguel

== Other ==
- The carrack Bérrio, part of the Portuguese explorer, Vasco da Gama's fleet
