= Robert Kurson =

American author (born 1963)

- Born: April 18, 1963 (age 63)
- Education: Harvard Law School, 1990
- Occupations: Author, journalist
- Writing career
- Notable works: The Official Three Stooges Encyclopedia : the ultimate knucklehead's guide to Stoogedom, from Amalgamated Association of Morons to Ziller, Zeller, and Zoller, Shadow Divers, Pirate Hunters, Rocket Men

Robert A. Kurson (born April 18, 1963) is an American author, best known for his 2004 bestselling book, Shadow Divers, the true story of two Americans who discover a World War II German U-boat sunk 60 miles off the coast of New Jersey.

== Career ==
Kurson began his career as a lawyer, graduating from Harvard Law School in 1990, and practicing real estate law. Kurson's professional writing career began at the Chicago Sun-Times, where he started as a sports agate clerk and soon gained a full-time features writing job. In 2000, Esquire published "My Favorite Teacher," his first magazine story, which became a finalist for a National Magazine Award. He moved from the Sun-Times to Chicago magazine, then to Esquire magazine, where he was a contributing editor. His stories have appeared in Rolling Stone, The New York Times Magazine, and other publications.

=== Shadow Divers ===
External videos
- Booknotes interview with Kurson on Shadow Divers, July 11, 2004, C-SPAN

In 2004, Random House published Kurson's book Shadow Divers: The True Adventure of Two Americans Who Risked Everything to Solve One of the Last Mysteries of World War II. The book follows two New Jersey divers, John Chatterton and Richie Kohler, as they spend six years leading an effort to identify a World War II German U-boat. The book chronicles the quest to learn the identity of the mysterious wreck, dubbed "U-Who" by the dive team, the identities of the men aboard her, and how she came to rest on the ocean floor near New Jersey.

Shadow Divers spent 24 weeks on the New York Times Bestseller list peaking at No. 2, and has been profiled by publications including CBS News, TIME Magazine, NPR, The Washington Post, The Los Angeles Times, and others. The book is often favorably compared to Sebastian Junger's The Perfect Storm and Jon Krakauer's Into Thin Air. Shadow Divers was awarded the American Booksellers Association's 2005 "Book of the Year Award". The book was also awarded the American Library Association's Alex Award. The book was translated into 22 languages.

=== Crashing Through ===
External videos
- Q&A interview with Kurson on Crashing Through, June 24, 2007, C-SPAN
- Presentation by Kurson on Crashing Through, June 7, 2007, C-SPAN

Kurson wrote the nonfiction book Crashing Through: A True Story of Risk, Adventure, and the Man Who Dared to See, which was published in 2007. Crashing Through recounts the story of Mike May, a prominent American entrepreneur and sports enthusiast, who regains his eyesight after a lifetime of blindness. Kurson based the book on his 2005 award-winning article "Into the Light" in Esquire. "Into the Light" won the 2006 National Magazine Award. The book debuted on The New York Times Bestseller list.

=== Pirate Hunters ===
External videos
- Q&A interview with Kurson on Pirate Hunters, August 2, 2015, C-SPAN

In Pirate Hunters: Treasure, Obsession, and the Search for a Legendary Pirate Ship, published in 2015, Kurson tells the nonfiction story of two shipwreck divers, John Chatterton (who was also featured in Shadow Divers) and John Mattera, on their search for the wreck of the 17th-century pirate ship Golden Fleece, which had been stolen by its captain Joseph Bannister and was later sunk by damage from a battle with two frigates of the Royal Navy. The book was a New York Times Bestseller.

=== Rocket Men ===
External videos
- Discussion on Rocket Men with Kurson and astronauts Frank Borman, Jim Lovell, and Bill Anders, April 5, 2018, C-SPAN
- Q&A interview with Kurson on Rocket Men, May 6, 2018, C-SPAN
- Presentation by Kurson on Rocket Men, June 10, 2018, C-SPAN
- Washington Journal interview with Kurson on Rocket Men, December 16, 2018, C-SPAN

In 2018 Kurson released Rocket Men: The Daring Odyssey of Apollo 8 and the Astronauts Who Made Man’s First Journey to the Moon. The book recounts the Apollo 8 mission, set against the backdrop of 1968, one of the most violent and divisive years in American history.

The Washington Post wrote “Rocket Men is close-to-the-bone adventure-telling on a par with Alfred Lansing’s Endurance and Jon Krakauer’s Into Thin Air. It’s as close to a movie as writing gets.” The book was a New York Times bestseller, was featured on The Today Show, and optioned for film and television.

== Bibliography ==
- Kurson, Robert (1998). The Official Three Stooges Encyclopedia : the ultimate knucklehead's guide to Stoogedom, from Amalgamated Association of Morons to Ziller, Zeller, and Zoller. Chicago: Contemporary Books. pp. 364 pp. ISBN 978-0-809-22929-1. OCLC: 37992935.
- Kurson, Robert (1999). The Official Three Stooges Cookbook. Chicago: Contemporary Books. pp. 211 pp. ISBN 978-0-809-22930-7. OCLC: 39181924.
- Kurson, Robert (2004). Shadow Divers. New York: Random House. pp. 375 pp. ISBN 978-0-375-50858-5. OCLC: 52902501.
- Kurson, Robert (2007). Crashing Through. New York: Random House. pp. 306 pp. ISBN 978-1-4000-6335-2. OCLC: 80917348.
- Kurson, Robert (2015). Pirate Hunters. New York: Random House. pp. 304 pp. ISBN 9781400063369.
- Kurson, Robert (2018). Rocket Men: The Daring Odyssey of Apollo 8 and the Astronauts Who Made Man's First Journey to the Moon. New York: Random House. pp. 384 pp. ISBN 9780812988703.
