= San Miguel Beermen (disambiguation) =

San Miguel Beermen is a professional basketball team in the Philippine Basketball Association.

San Miguel Beermen may also refer to:

- San Miguel Beermen (3x3 team), defunct 3x3 basketball team affiliated with the original franchise
- San Miguel Beermen (ABL), defunct basketball team in the ASEAN Basketball League and an affiliate of the original franchise

== See also ==
- San Miguel Alab Pilipinas, defunct basketball team in the ASEAN Basketball League sponsored by the original franchise's owner
- San Miguel Beer (disambiguation)
