= Santiago Tillo =

Coordinates: 17°27′N 97°19′W

- Municipality and town
- Interactive map of Santiago Tillo
- Country: Mexico
- State: Oaxaca
- Time zone: UTC-6 (Central Standard Time)

Santiago Tillo is a town and municipality in Oaxaca in south-western Mexico. The municipality covers an area of km^{2}. It is part of the Nochixtlán District in the southeast of the Mixteca Region.

As of 2005, the municipality had a total population of .
