= San Pedro Tidaá =

- Municipality and town
- Location in Mexico
- Coordinates: 17°20′N 97°23′W
- Country: Mexico
- State: Oaxaca
- Time zone: UTC-6 (Central Standard Time)

San Pedro Tidaá is a town and municipality in Oaxaca in south-western Mexico. The municipality covers an area of km^{2}. It is part of the Nochixtlán District in the southeast of the Mixteca Region.
