= Mesoamerican ballcourt =

Pre-Columbian sports venue

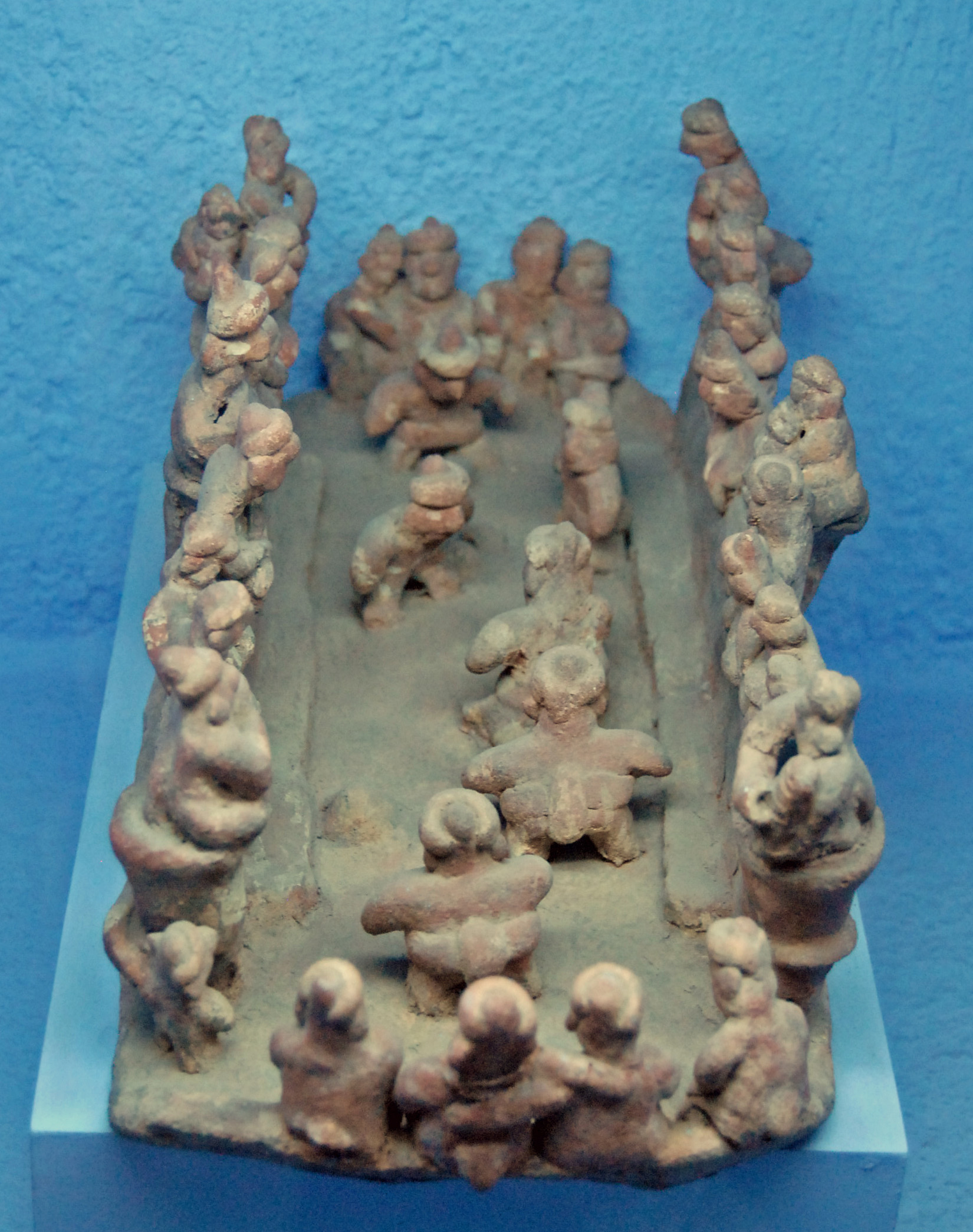
Ceramic sculpture from a Western Mexican tomb showing players engaged in the Mesoamerican ballgame

A Mesoamerican ballcourt (Nahuatl languages: tlachtli) is a large masonry structure of a type used in Mesoamerica for more than 2,700 years to play the Mesoamerican ballgame, particularly the hip-ball version of the ballgame. More than 2,300 probable ballcourts have been identified in the region. Although there is a tremendous variation in size, in general all ballcourts are the same shape: a long narrow alley flanked by two walls with horizontal, vertical, and sloping faces. Although the alleys in early ballcourts were open-ended, later ballcourts had enclosed end-zones, giving the structure an -shape when viewed from above.

Ballcourts were also used for functions other than, or in addition to, ballgames. Ceramics from western Mexico show ballcourts being used for other sporting endeavours, including what appears to be a wrestling match. It is also known from archaeological excavations that ballcourts were the sites of sumptuous feasts, although whether these were conducted in the context of the ballgame or as another event entirely is not as yet known. The siting of the most prominent ballcourts within the sacred precincts of cities and towns, as well as the votive deposits found buried there, demonstrates that the ballcourts were places of spectacle and ritual.

== Distribution ==
Although ballcourts are found within most Mesoamerican sites, they are not equally distributed across time or geography. For example, the Late Classic site of El Tajin, the largest city of the ballgame-obsessed Classic Veracruz culture, has at least 18 ballcourts while Cantona, a nearby contemporaneous site, sets the record with 24. In contrast, Northern Chiapas and the northern Maya Lowlands have relatively few, and ballcourts are conspicuously absent at some major sites, including Teotihuacan, Bonampak, and Tortuguero.

The ballgame was initially thought to be originated in the coastal lowlands, yet a ballcourt was discovered at Etlatongo in the mountains of southern Mexico, dating to 1374 BCE.

It is thought that ballcourts are an indication of decentralization of political and economic power: areas with a strong centralized state, such as the Aztec Empire, have relatively few ballcourts while areas with smaller competing polities have many. At Cantona, for example, the extraordinary number of ballcourts is likely due to the many and diverse cultures residing there under a relatively weak state.

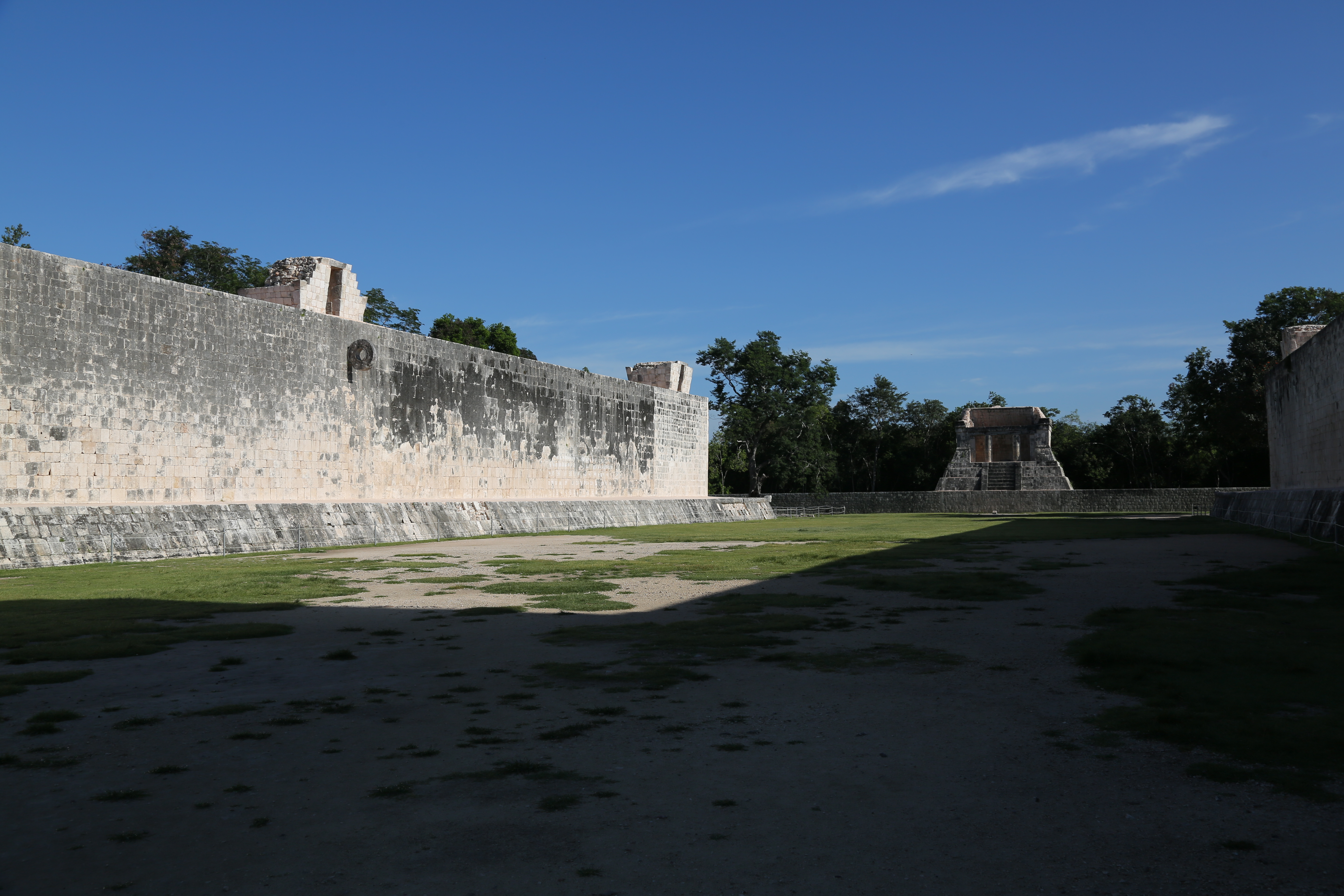
Great Ballcourt at Chichen Itza

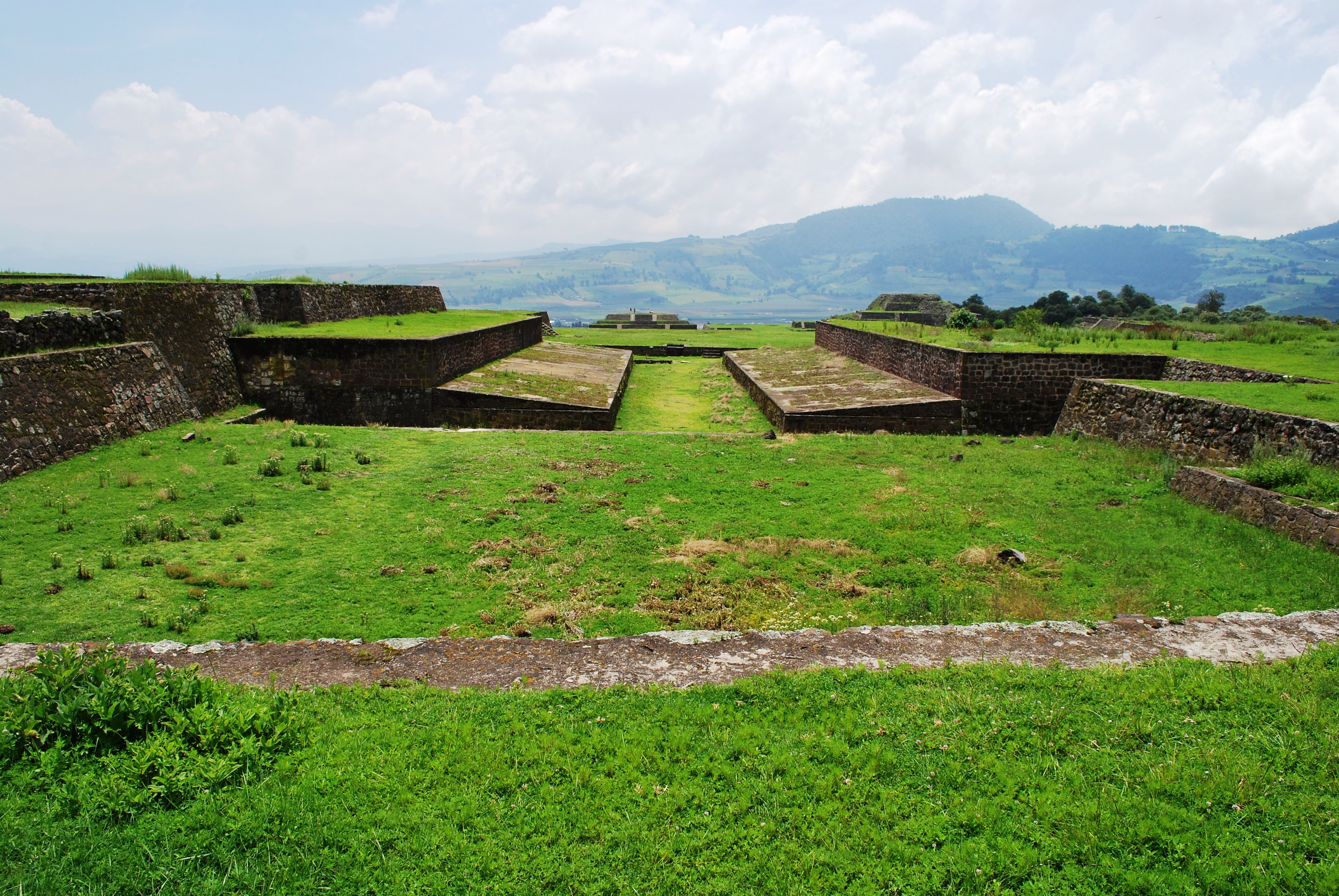
Mesoamerican ball court at Teotenango

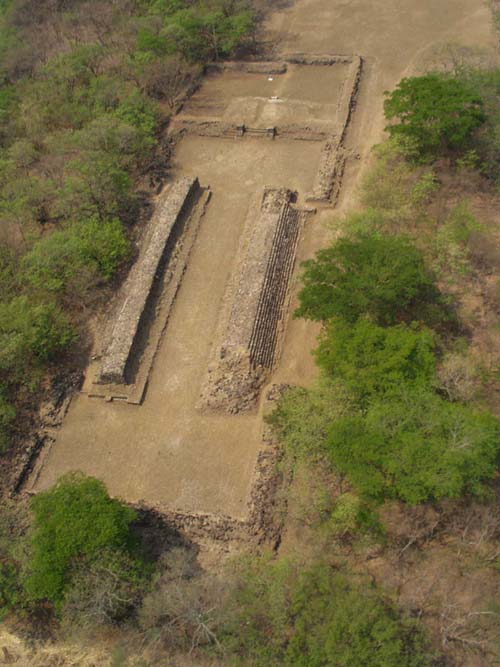
Classic -shape ball court in Cihuatan site, El Salvador

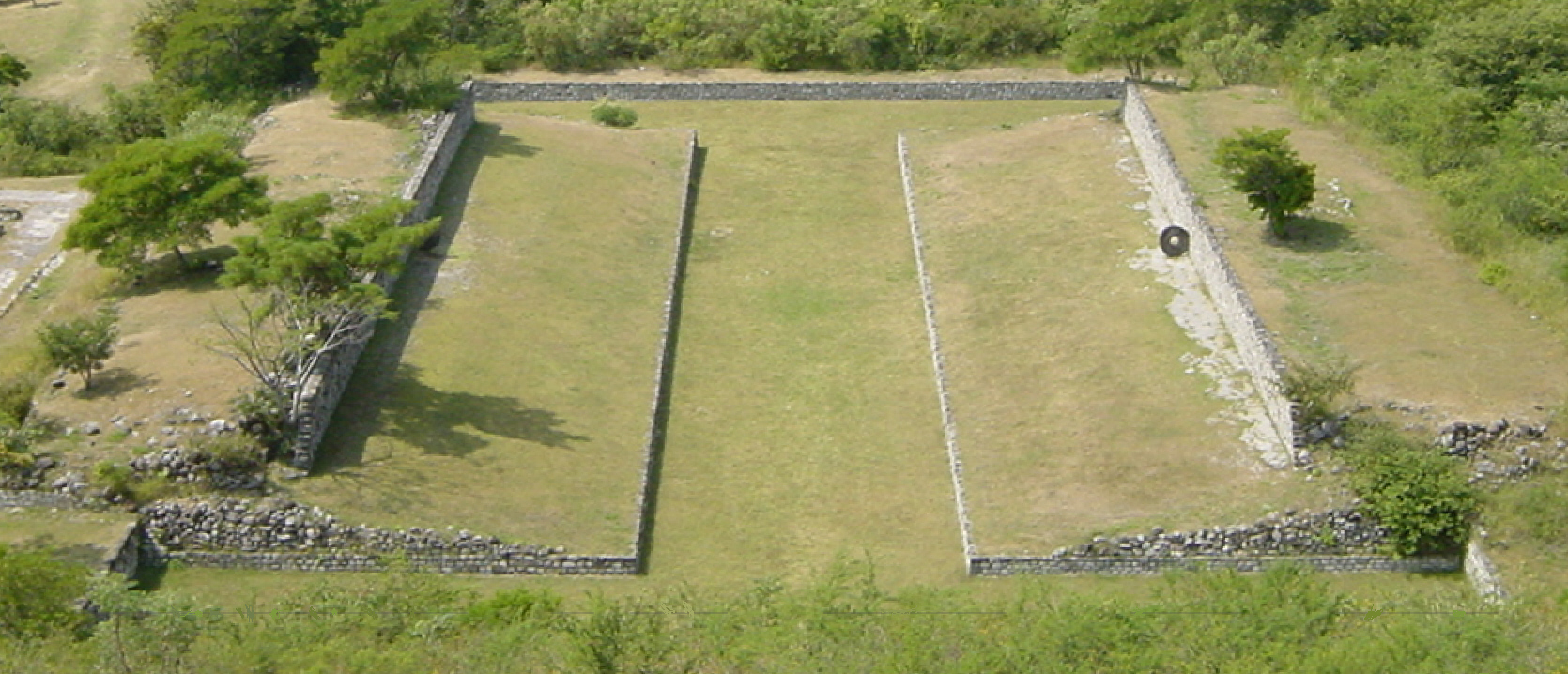
One of the ballcourts at Xochicalco. Note the characteristic -shape, as well as the rings set above the apron at center court. The setting sun of the equinox shines through the ring.

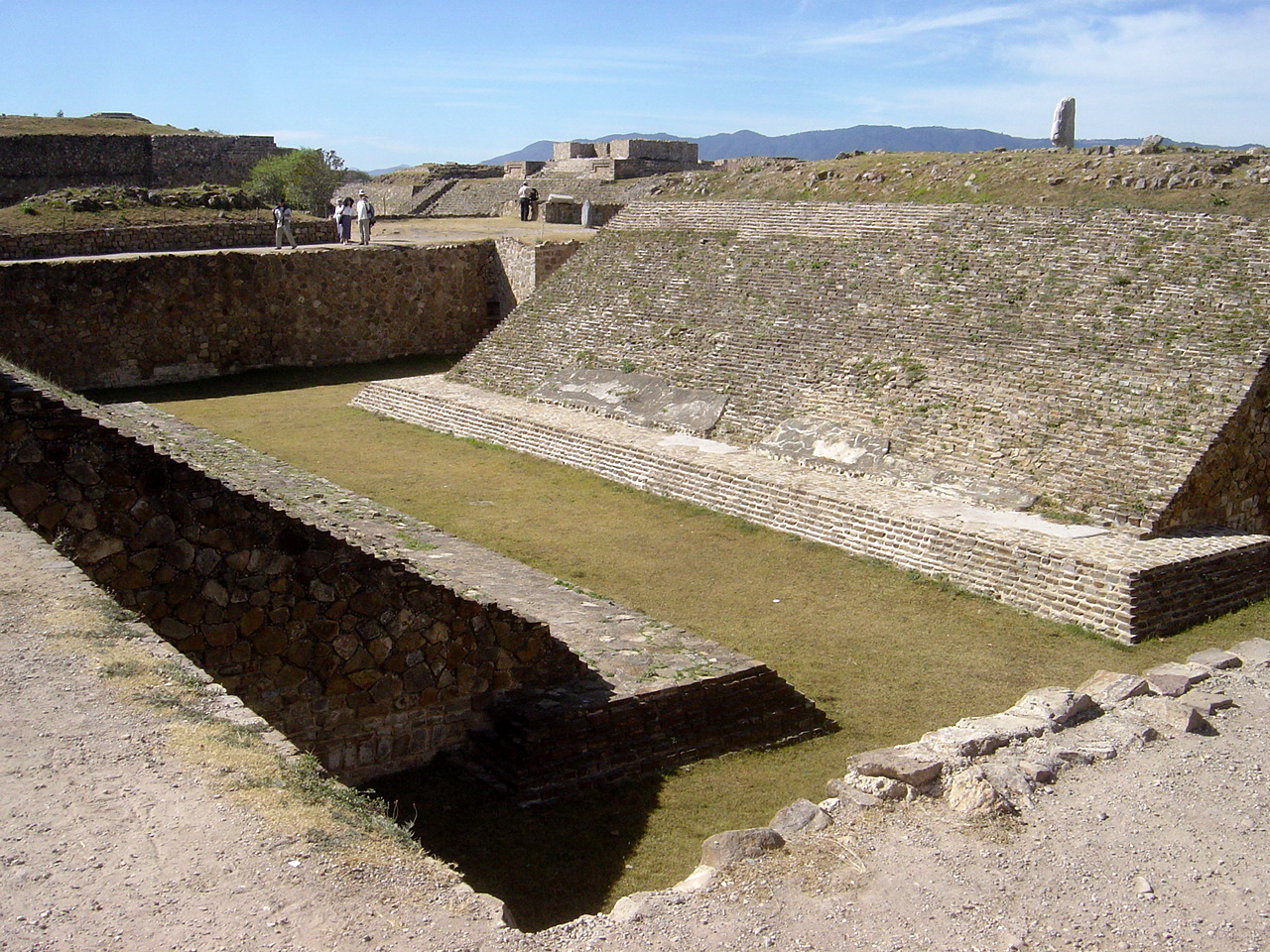
Ballgame court at Monte Albán

== Size and shape ==
Ballcourts vary considerably in size. One of the smallest, at Tikal site, is only one-sixth the size of the Great Ballcourt at Chichen Itza. Despite the variation in size, ballcourts' playing alleys are generally the same shape, with an average length-to-width ratio of 4-to-1, although some regional variation is found: Central Mexico, for example, has slightly longer playing alleys, and the Maya Northern Lowlands slightly wider.

The following is a comparison of the size of the playing alleys for several well-known ballcourts.

Site	Culture	length (meters)	width (meters)	length-to-width ratio
Xochicalco	Xochicalco	51	9	5.7
Monte Albán	Zapotec	26	5	5.2
El Tajin	Classic Veracruz	126	25	5.1
Chichen Itza (Grand Ballcourt)	Maya	96	30.4	3.2
Tikal (Small ceremonial)	Maya	16	5	3.2
Yaxchilan II	Maya	18	5	3.6
Tula	Toltec	41	10	4.1

=== Evolution ===
The earliest ballcourts were doubtless temporary marked off areas of compacted soil much like those used to play the modern ulama game, the Mesoamerican ballgame's descendant.

Ballcourt terminology. Not all ballcourts have all these surfaces.

Paso de la Amada, Soconusco, along the Pacific coast boasts the oldest ballcourt yet identified, dated to approximately 1400 BC. This narrow ballcourt has an 80 m × 8 m (262 ft × 26 ft) flat playing alley defined by two flanking earthen mounds with "benches" running along their length.

By the Early Classic, ballcourt designs began to feature an additional pair of mounds set some distance beyond the ends of the alley as if to keep errant balls from rolling too far away. By the Terminal Classic, the end zones of many ballcourts were enclosed, creating the well-known -shape.

The evolution of the ballcourt is, of course, more complex than the foregoing suggests, and with over 1300 known ballcourts, there are exceptions to any generalization.

- Open ballcourts (i.e. without endzones) continued to be constructed into the Terminal Classic and at smaller sites.
- Some ballcourts featured only one enclosed endzone (the so-called T-shape) while some ballcourts' endzones are of different depths.
- During the Formative period, some enclosed ballcourts were entirely rectangular, without endzones. One such court, at La Lagunita in the Guatemala Highlands, features rounded side walls.

Cross sections of some of the more typical ballcourts. Jacinto Quirarte has classified Copan, Uxmal, and Xochicalco at Type I, Monte Albán as Type II, Chichen Itza as Type III, and Toluquilla as Type IV.

=== Walls and surfaces ===
Unlike the compacted earth of the playing alley, the side walls of the formal ballcourts were lined with stone blocks. These walls featured 3 or more horizontal and sloping surfaces. Vertical surfaces are less common, but they begin to replace the sloping apron during the Classic era, and are a feature of several of the largest and best-known ballcourts, including the Great Ballcourt at Chichen Itza and the North and South Ballcourts at El Tajin. There the vertical surfaces were covered with elaborate reliefs showing scenes, particularly sacrificial scenes, related to the ballgame.

=== Orientation ===
Most prominent ballcourts were part of their town or city's central monumental precinct and as such they share the orientation of pyramids and other structures there. Since many Mesoamerican cities and towns were oriented to a few degrees east of north (roughly 15° east of north), it is not surprising to find that in the Valley of Oaxaca, for example, ballcourt orientations also tend to be a few degrees east of north, or at right angles to that.

Other than this general trend, no consistent orientation of ballcourts throughout Mesoamerica has been found, although some patterns do emerge at the regional level. In the Cotzumalhuapa region, for example, open-ended ballcourts with a north-south orientation were earlier than east-west enclosed courts.

== Rings, markers, and other features ==
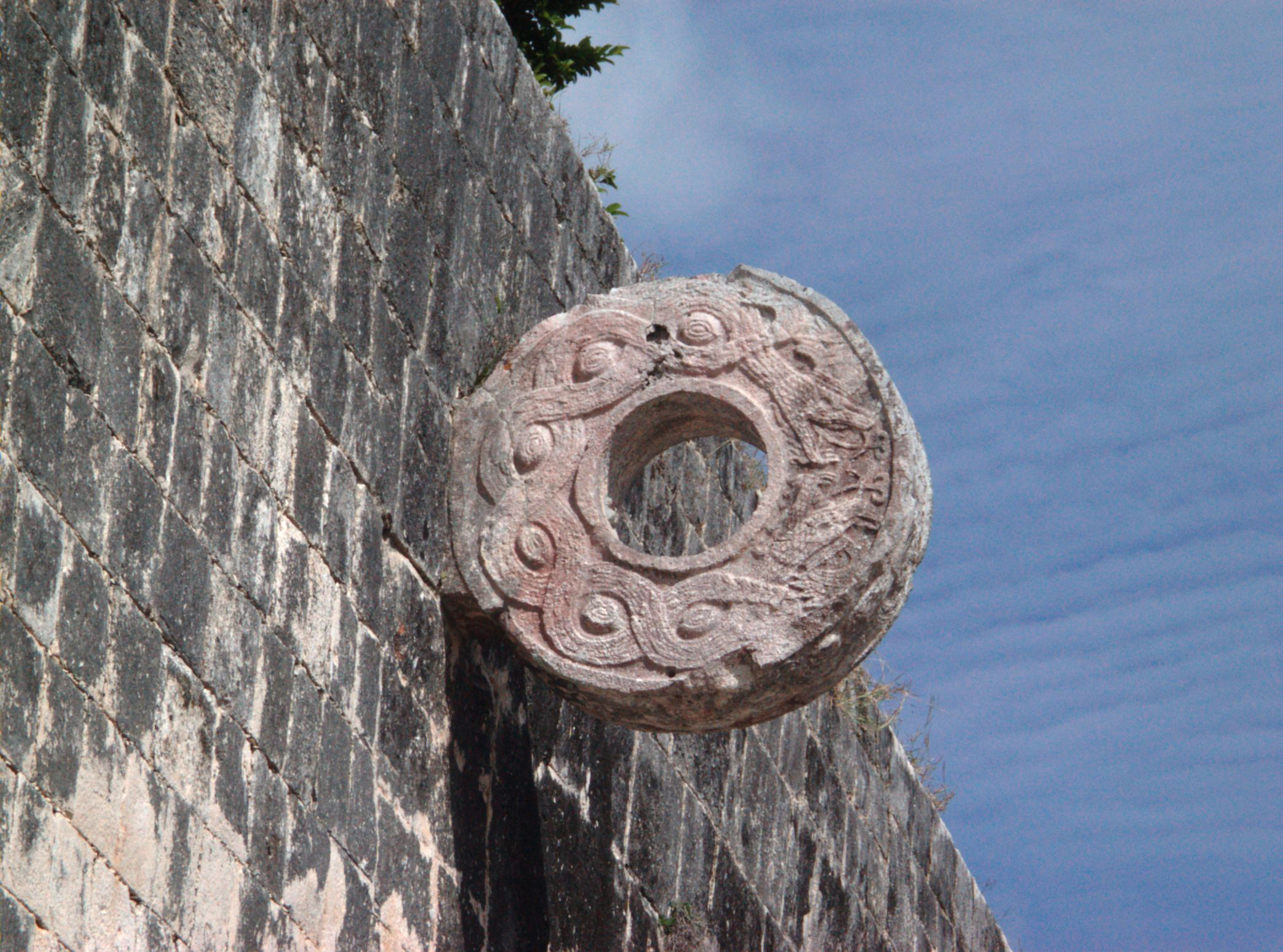
A ring at Chichen Itza. This ring was set some 6 meters (20 feet) above the playing alley, making it extremely difficult to pass the heavy ball through the hole.

Stone rings, tenoned into the wall at mid-court, appeared in the Terminal Classic era. Actually sending a ball through the ring must have been a rare occurrence. The players could not use their hands or even feet to guide the ball. Moreover, the rings were only slightly larger than the ball itself and were located at no small distance from the playing alley. At Chichen Itza, for example, they were set 6 meters above the alley, while at Xochicalco they set at the top of an 11-meter-wide apron, 3 meters above the playing alley (see lead photo).

As shown on Aztec codices, court markers were also used on many ballcourts to establish the dividing line between teams – one set into the playing alley floor at exact mid-court, the other two placed against each side wall. However, such placement is not universal. Two ancient ceramic ballcourt models recovered from western Mexico show the three markers placed length-wise along the court: one (again) at exact mid-court with the remaining pair set midway between the walls at either end of the playing alley. The ballcourt markers at Copan are also arranged in this manner. The ballcourt at Monte Albán, meanwhile, has only one court marker, placed at the exact center of the court.

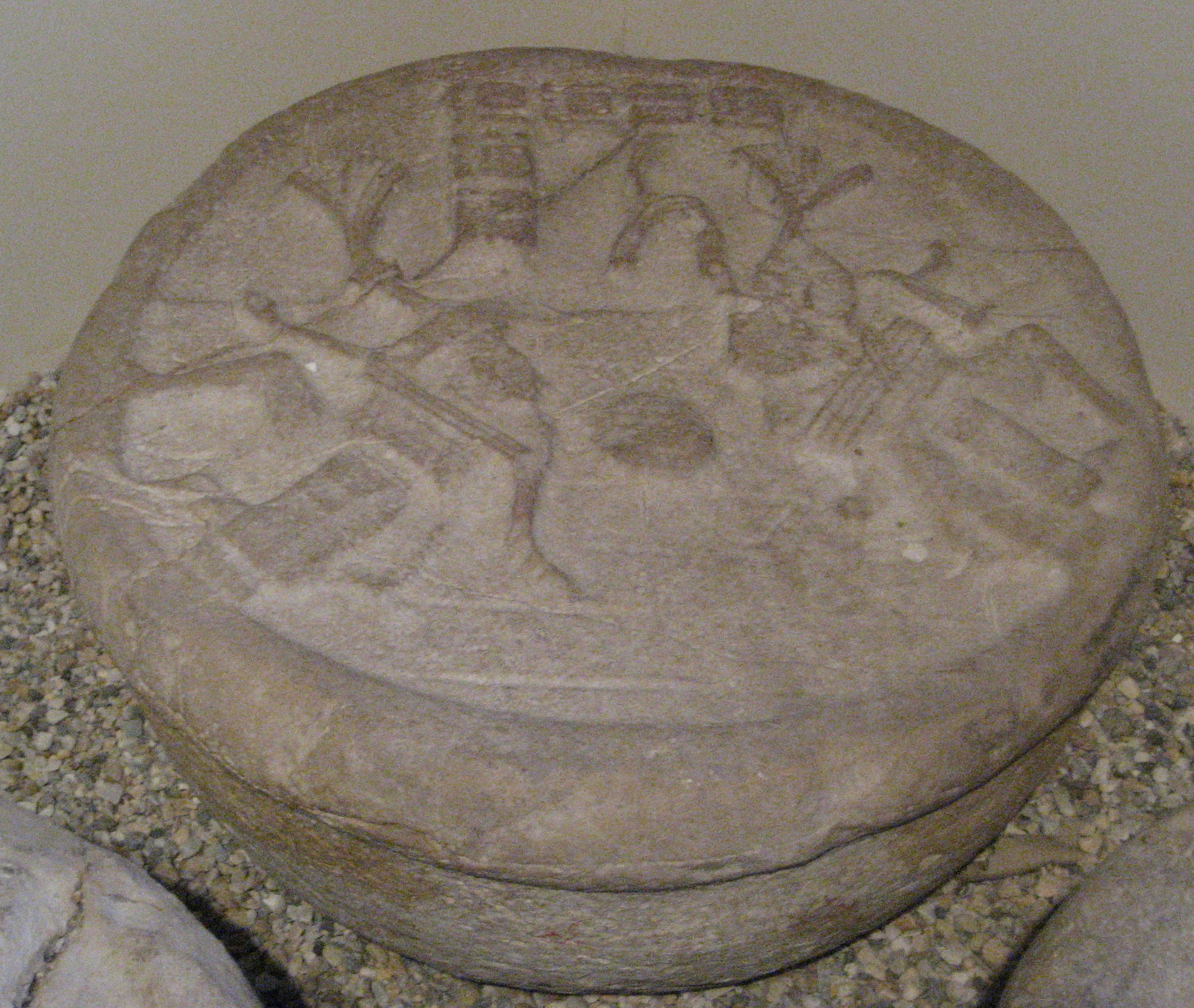
Court marker from the Mayan site of Lubaantun showing two players volleying. Note the rounded bottom that anchors the marker into the court.

These sunken court markers are almost invariably round and usually decorated with ballgame-related scenes or iconography. Other markers were set into ballcourt walls. Many researchers have also proposed that above-ground, moveable objects, for example stone hachas, were also used as court markers.

Various sculptures, stelae, and other stonework were also important components of the ballcourt. At the ballcourt at Tonina, for example, 6 sculptures of prone captives overhang the apron, a pair at mid-court and a pair at each of the ends of the cornice. Unfortunately, rings, markers and sculptures are more portable and more prone to removal or destruction than the permanent ballcourt infrastructure, and at some ballcourts these features have been lost forever.

== Maya stairs ==
Many – or even most – Maya depictions of ballgame play are shown against a backdrop of stairs. Conversely, Maya staircases will occasionally feature reliefs of ballgame scenes or ballgame-related glyphs on their risers. The most famous of these are the Hieroglyphic Stairs at Structure 33 in Yaxchilan, where 11 of the 13 risers feature ballgame-related scenes. In these scenes, it appears as if the players were actually playing the ball against the stairs in what would seem to be a Maya version of stoop ball.

The association of stairs and the ballgame is not well understood. Linda Schele and Mary Miller propose that the depictions record historic events and in particular record a "form of play ... distinct from the game conducted on the courts", one that "probably followed immediately after[ward] on steps adjacent to the ballcourts". Other researchers are skeptical. Marvin Cohodas, for example, proposes that the "stairs" are instead stepped platforms associated with human sacrifice, while Carolyn Tate views the Yaxchilan stair scenes as "the Underworld segment of a cosmogram".

== Image gallery ==
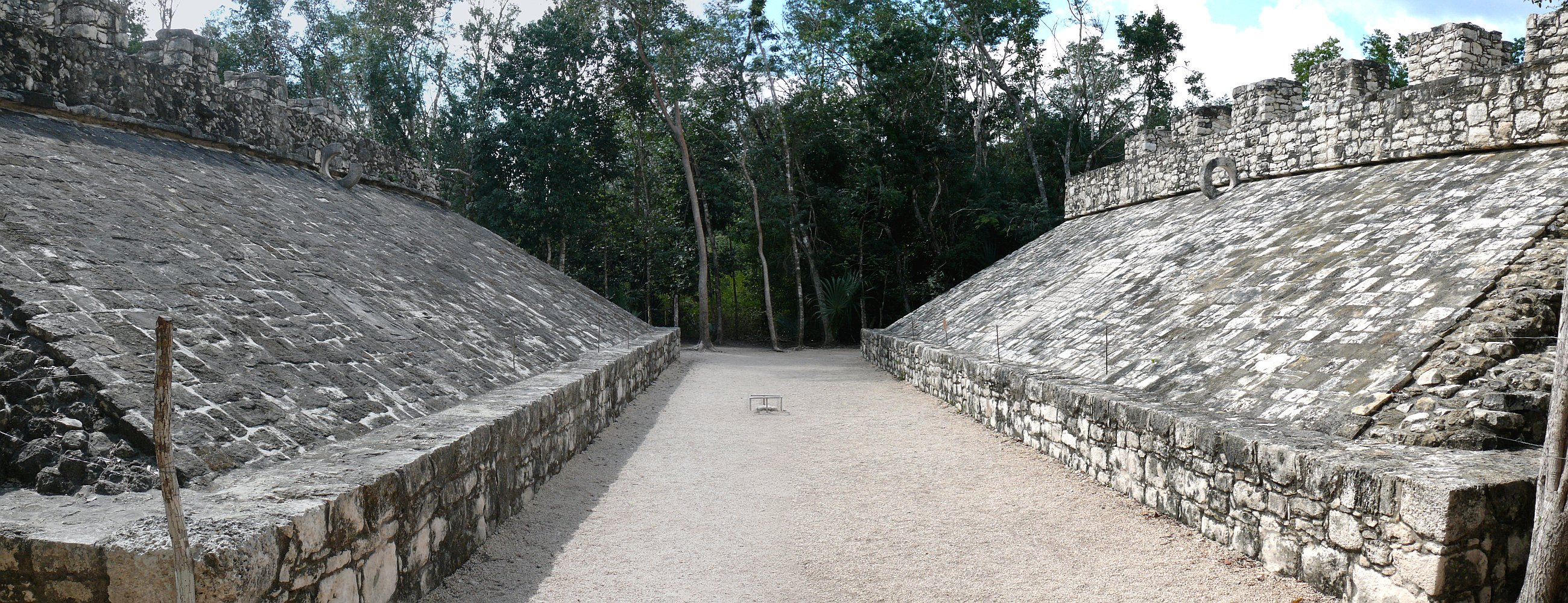
One of two Mesoamerican ballgame courts at Cobá

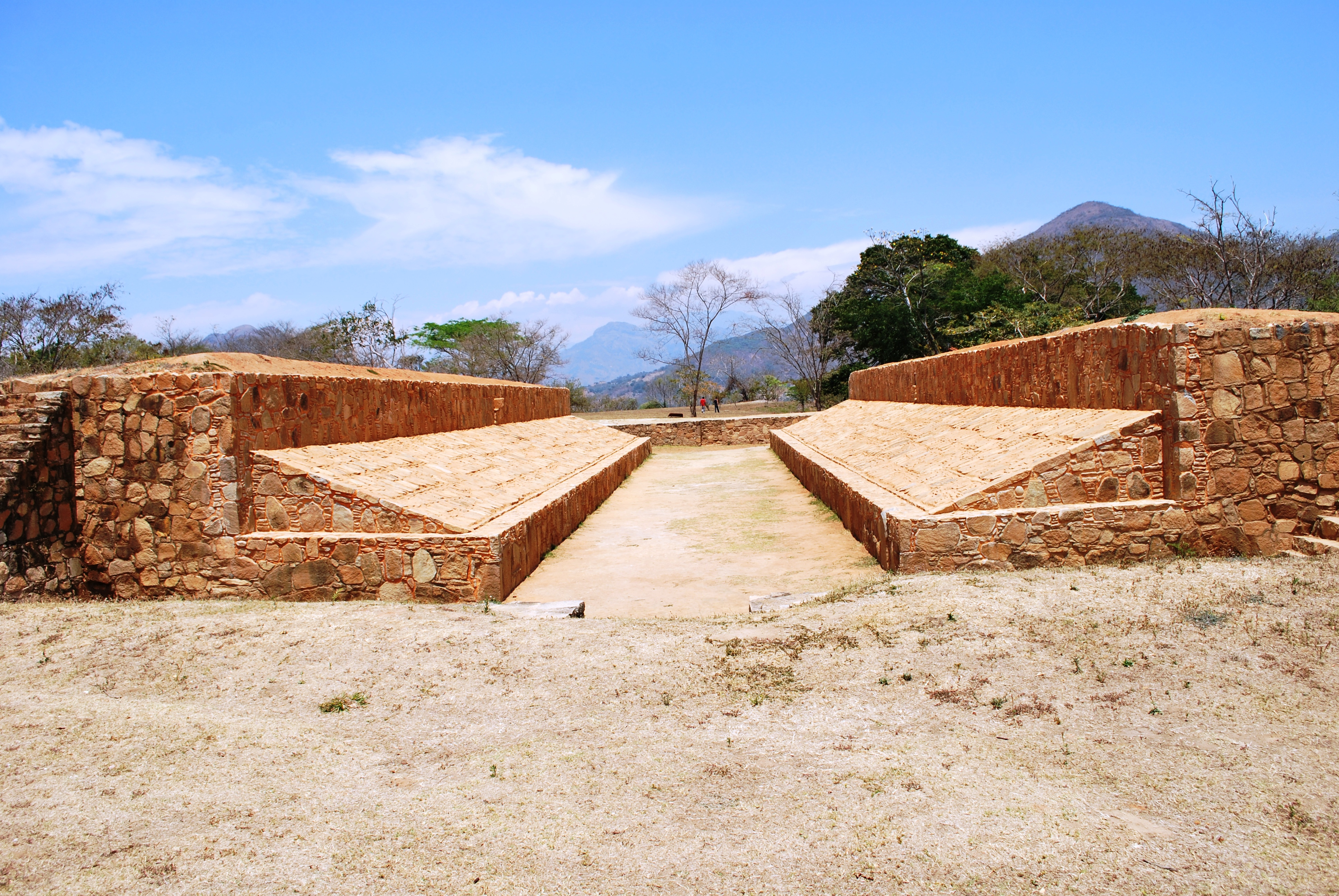
The Tehuacalco Mesoamerican ball court

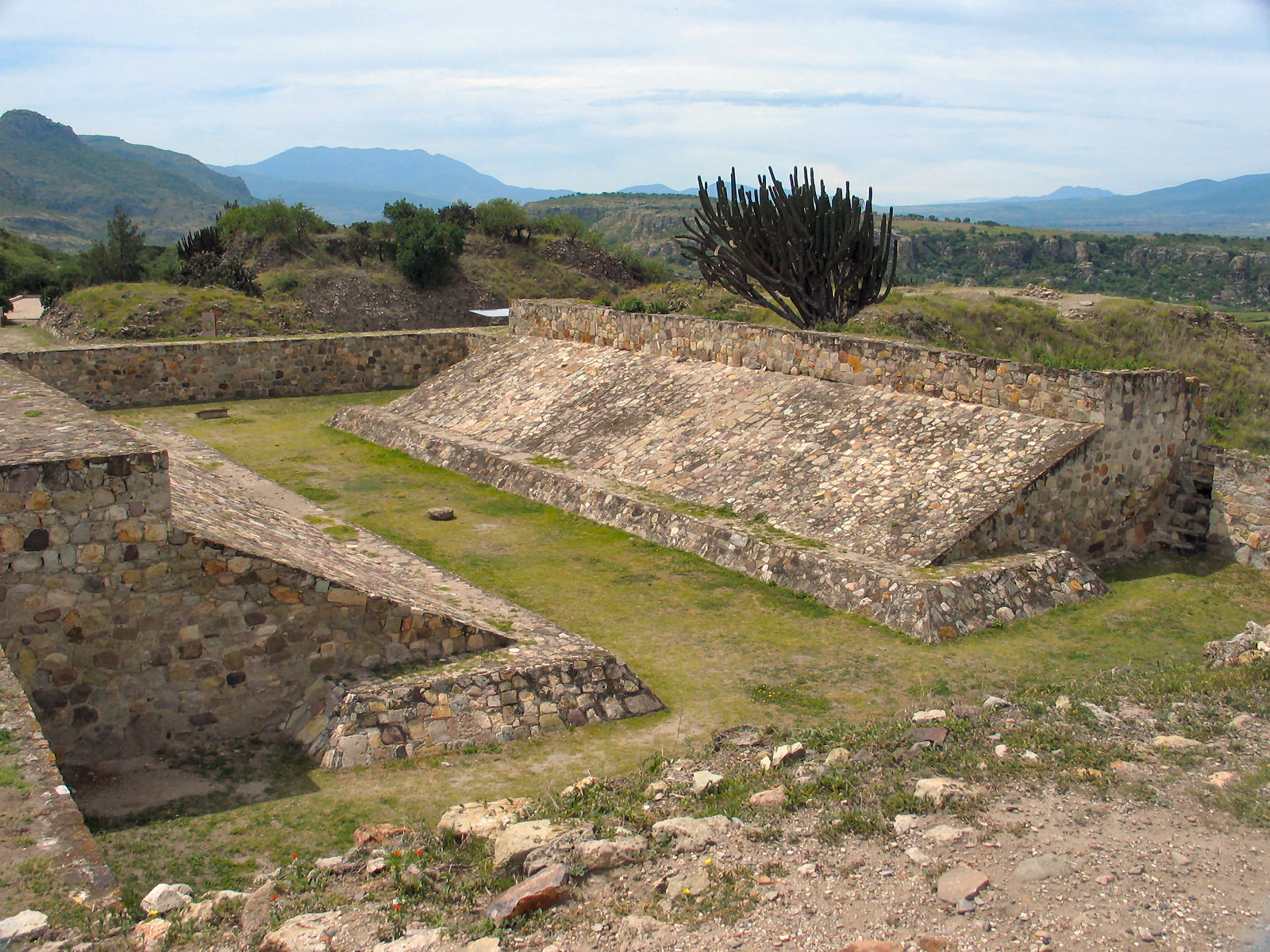
Yagul Ball Court

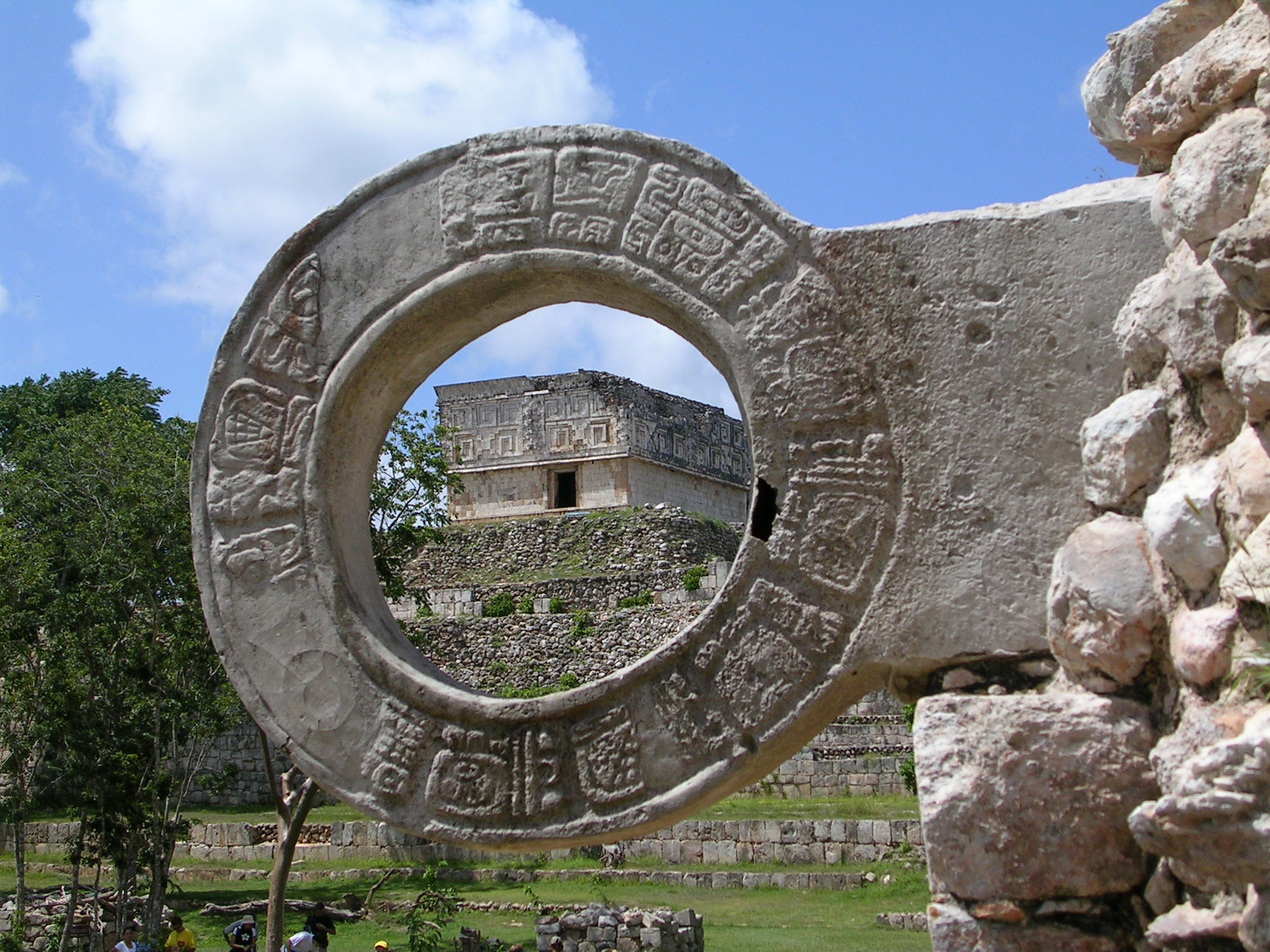
poc-ta-tok field, Mexico
