= SMB =

SMB may refer to:

== Business ==
- Small and medium businesses, also known as small and medium enterprises

== Arts and entertainment ==
- Sveriges Medeltida Ballader, a compilation of Swedish medieval ballads
- Michigan State University Spartan Marching Band
- Super Mario Bros., a 1985 NES video game
  - Super Mario Bros. (disambiguation), other articles related to the NES game
- Super Monkey Ball, a video game series
  - Super Monkey Ball (video game), the first game in the series
- Super Meat Boy, a 2010 platform video game
- Super Mega Baseball, a sports video game series

== Music ==
- "SMB" (song), by Odetari Hongjoong, 2025
- "SMB", a song by Tech N9ne from Something Else, 2013

== Science ==
- Society for Mathematical Biology
- Surface mass balance of a glacier or ice sheet

== Technology ==
=== Electronics and computing ===
- SMB connector, SubMiniature B connector
- System Management Bus, for computer communication
- Server Message Block (SMB or SMB/CIFS), a network protocol

=== Other technologies ===
- Simulated moving bed for chromatographic separation
- Surface marker buoy, to indicate a diver's position
- Survey motor boat, for hydrographic survey

== Other uses ==
- San Miguel Beermen (disambiguation), the name of several Philippine basketball teams
- Sean Murphy-Bunting, an American footballer
- Sekolah Menengah Berakas (Berakas Secondary School), Brunei
- Seven Mile Beach, Grand Cayman
- Shimbashi Station (Tokyo), JR East station code
- Staatliche Museen zu Berlin, a group of museums in Berlin
