= San Juan Yucuita =

- Municipality and town
- Location in Mexico
- Coordinates: 17°30′N 97°16′W
- Country: Mexico
- State: Oaxaca

Area
  - Total: 75.27 km^{2} (29.06 sq mi)

Population (2005)
  - Total: 656
- Time zone: UTC-6 (Central Standard Time)

San Juan Yucuita is a town and municipality in Oaxaca in south-western Mexico. The municipality covers an area of 75.27 km^{2}. It is a part of the Nochixtlán District in the southeast of the Mixteca Region.

As of 2005, the municipality had a total population of 656.
