= San Andrés Sinaxtla =

- Municipality and town
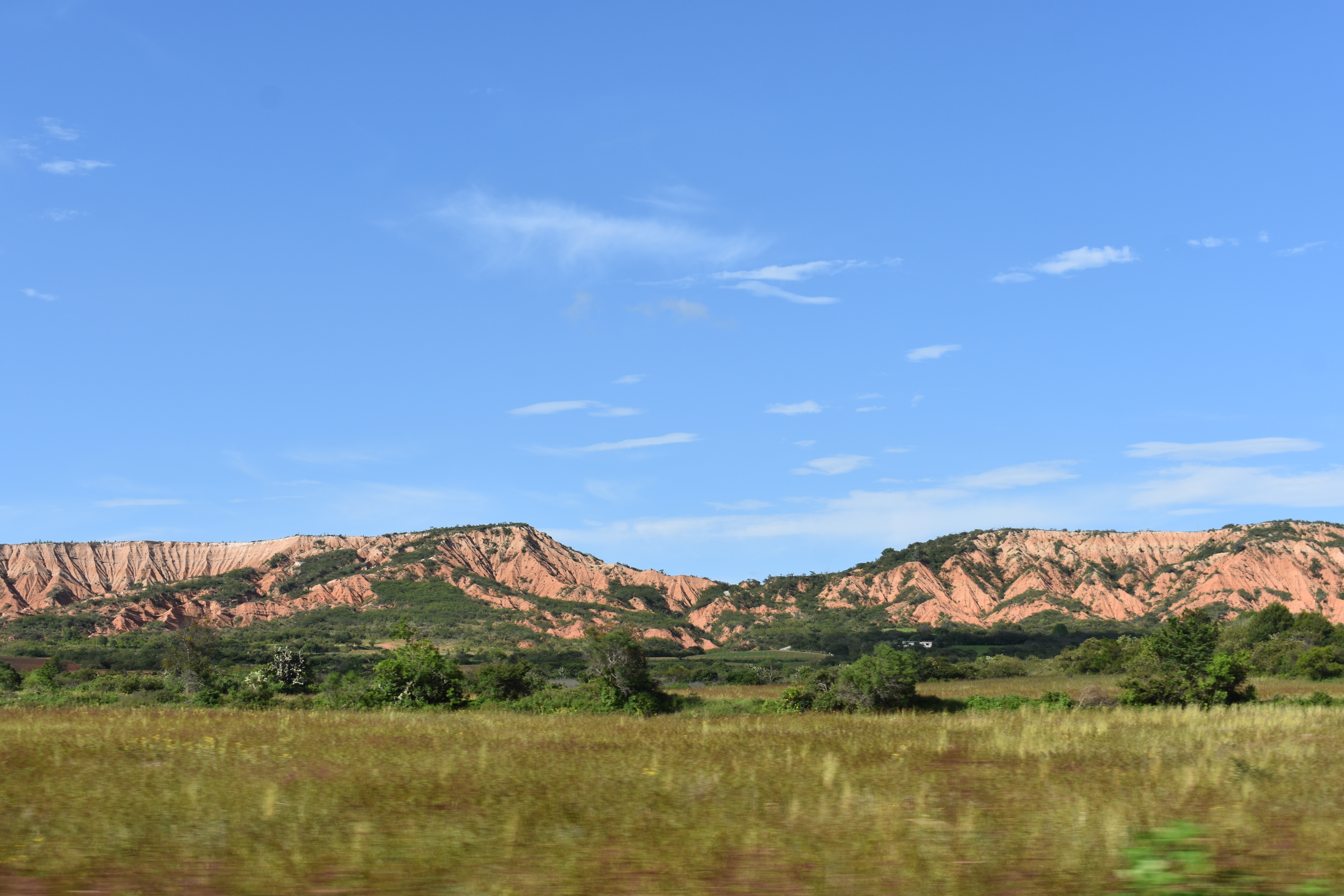
- Mountains in the region

- Location in Mexico
- Coordinates: 17°28′N 97°17′W
- Country: Mexico
- State: Oaxaca

Area
  - Total: 34.45 km^{2} (13.30 sq mi)

Population (2005)
  - Total: 613
- Time zone: UTC-6 (Central Standard Time)

San Andrés Sinaxtla is a town and municipality in Oaxaca in south-western Mexico. The municipality covers an area of 34.45 km^{2}. It is part of the Nochixtlán District in the southeast of the Mixteca Region.

As of 2005, the municipality had a total population of 613.
