= São Miguel do Fidalgo =

Coordinates: 7.58583°S 42.37°W

- Municipality
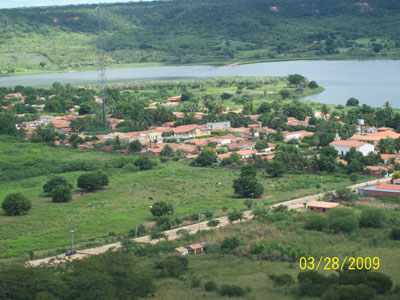
- View of São Miguel do Fidalgo

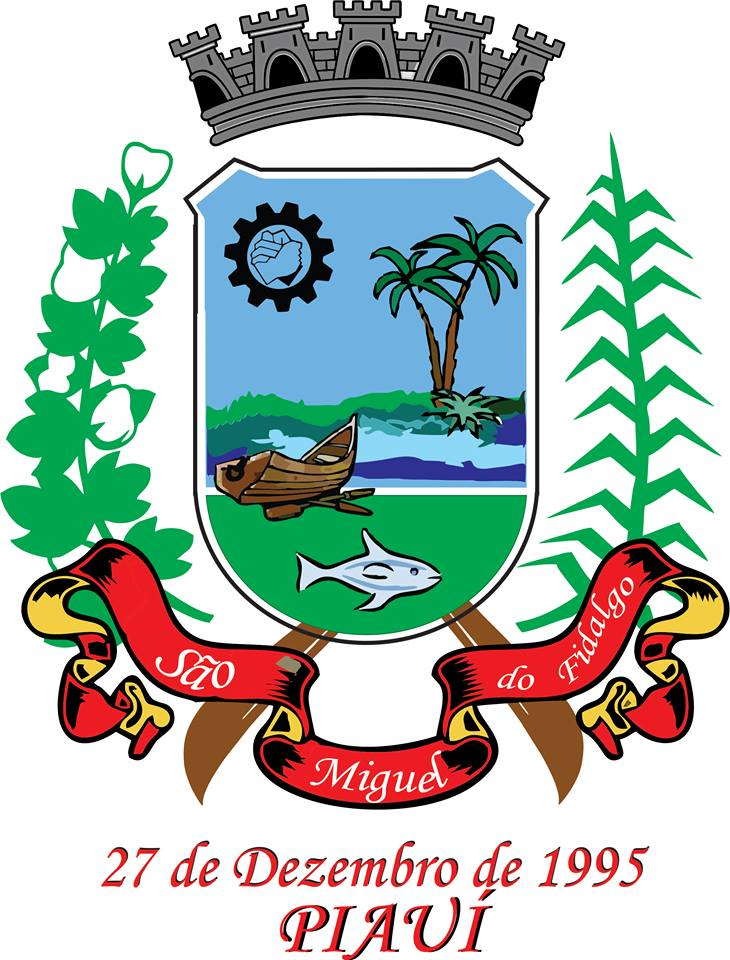
- Coat of arms

- Country: Brazil
- Region: Nordeste
- State: Piauí
- Mesoregion: Sudoeste Piauiense

Population (2020)
  - Total: 3,038
- Time zone: UTC−3 (BRT)

São Miguel do Fidalgo is a municipality in the state of Piauí in the Northeast region of Brazil.

== See also ==
- List of municipalities in Piauí
