= San Miguel de Corneja =

- municipality
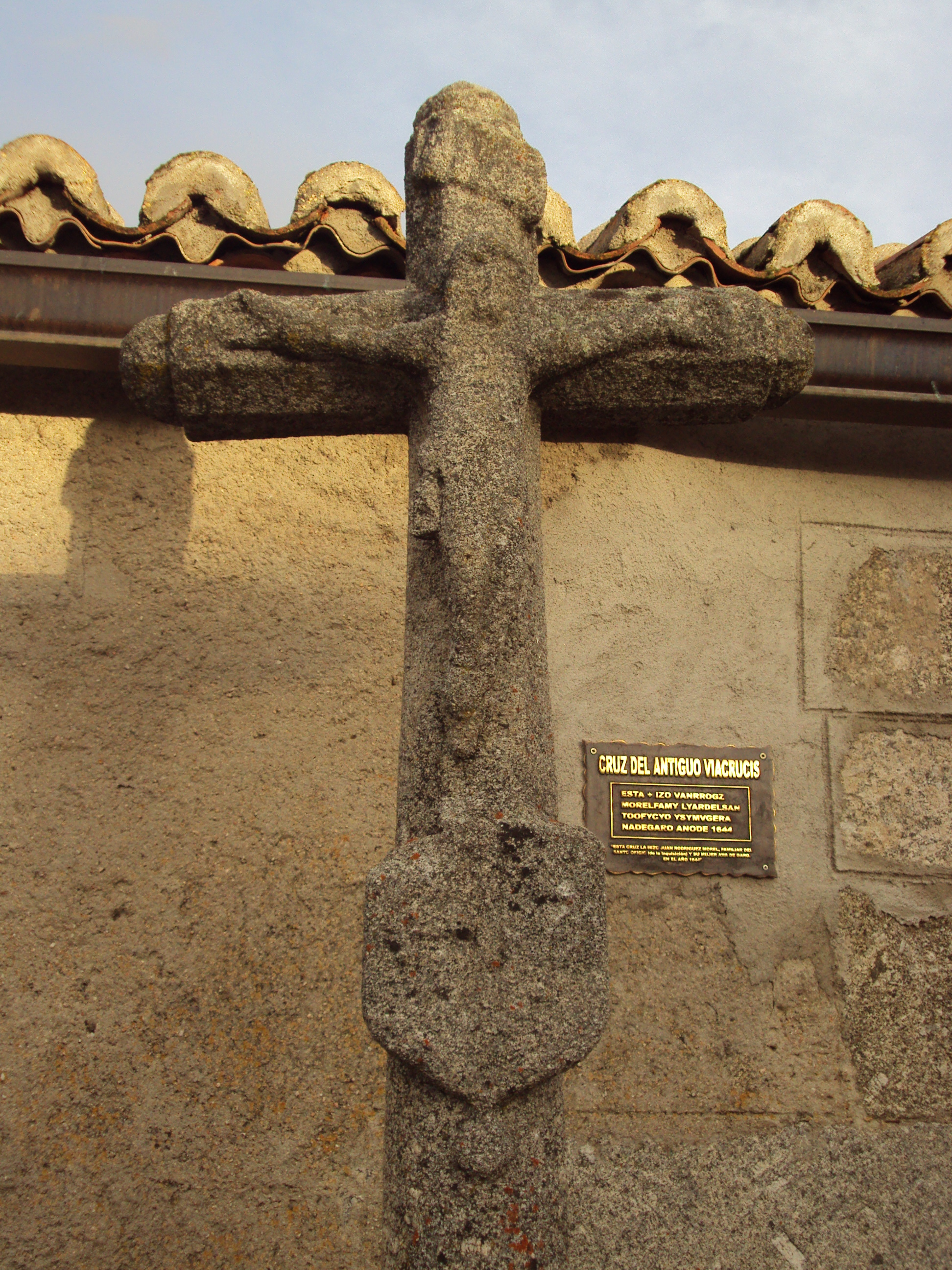
- Cross of Via Crucis in San Miguel de Corneja

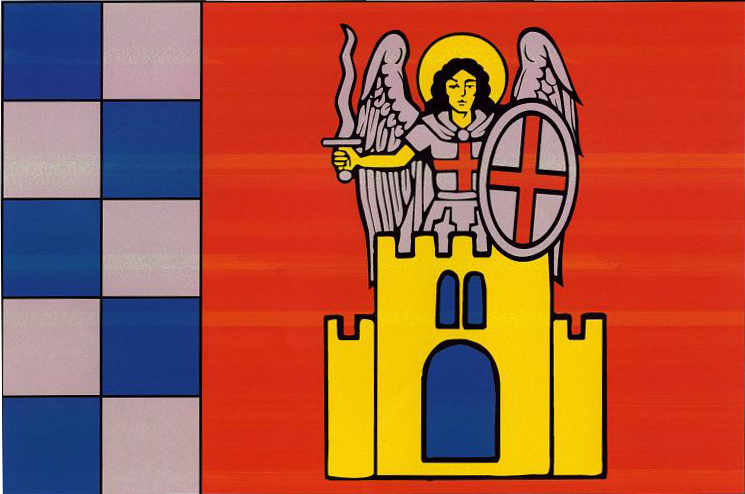
- Flag Coat of arms

- Location in Spain. San Miguel de Corneja (Spain)
- Coordinates: 40°29′12″N 5°17′15″W
- Country: Spain
- Autonomous community: Castile and León
- Province: Ávila

Area
  - Total: 6 km^{2} (2.3 sq mi)

Population (2025-01-01)
  - Total: 65
  - Density: 11/km^{2} (28/sq mi)
- Time zone: UTC+1 (CET)
  - Summer (DST): UTC+2 (CEST)
- Website: Official website

San Miguel de Corneja is a municipality located in the province of Ávila, Castile and León, Spain.

== Population ==
Historical population
Year	Pop.	±% p.a.
2023	70	—
2024	70	+0.00%
2025	65	−7.14%
Source: INE
