= San Francisco Jaltepetongo =

- Municipality and town
- Location in Mexico
- Coordinates: 17°23′N 97°16′W
- Country: Mexico
- State: Oaxaca

Area
  - Total: 71.45 km^{2} (27.59 sq mi)

Population (2005)
  - Total: 881
- Time zone: UTC-6 (Central Standard Time)

San Francisco Jaltepetongo is a town and municipality in Oaxaca in south-western Mexico. The municipality covers an area of 71.45 km^{2} (27.59 sq mi). It is part of the Nochixtlán District in the southeast of the Mixteca Region.

As of 2005, the municipality had a total population of 881.
