= San Miguel Chicahua =

- Municipality and town
- Location in Mexico
- Coordinates: 17°38′N 97°12′W
- Country: Mexico
- State: Oaxaca

Area
  - Total: 94.41 km^{2} (36.45 sq mi)

Population (2005)
  - Total: 2,035
- Time zone: UTC-6 (Central Standard Time)

San Miguel Chicahua is a town and municipality in Oaxaca in south-western Mexico. The municipality covers an area of 94.41 km^{2}. It is part of the Nochixtlán District in the southeast of the Mixteca Region.

As of 2005, the municipality had a total population of 2,035.
