= Joseph Bannister =

English pirate

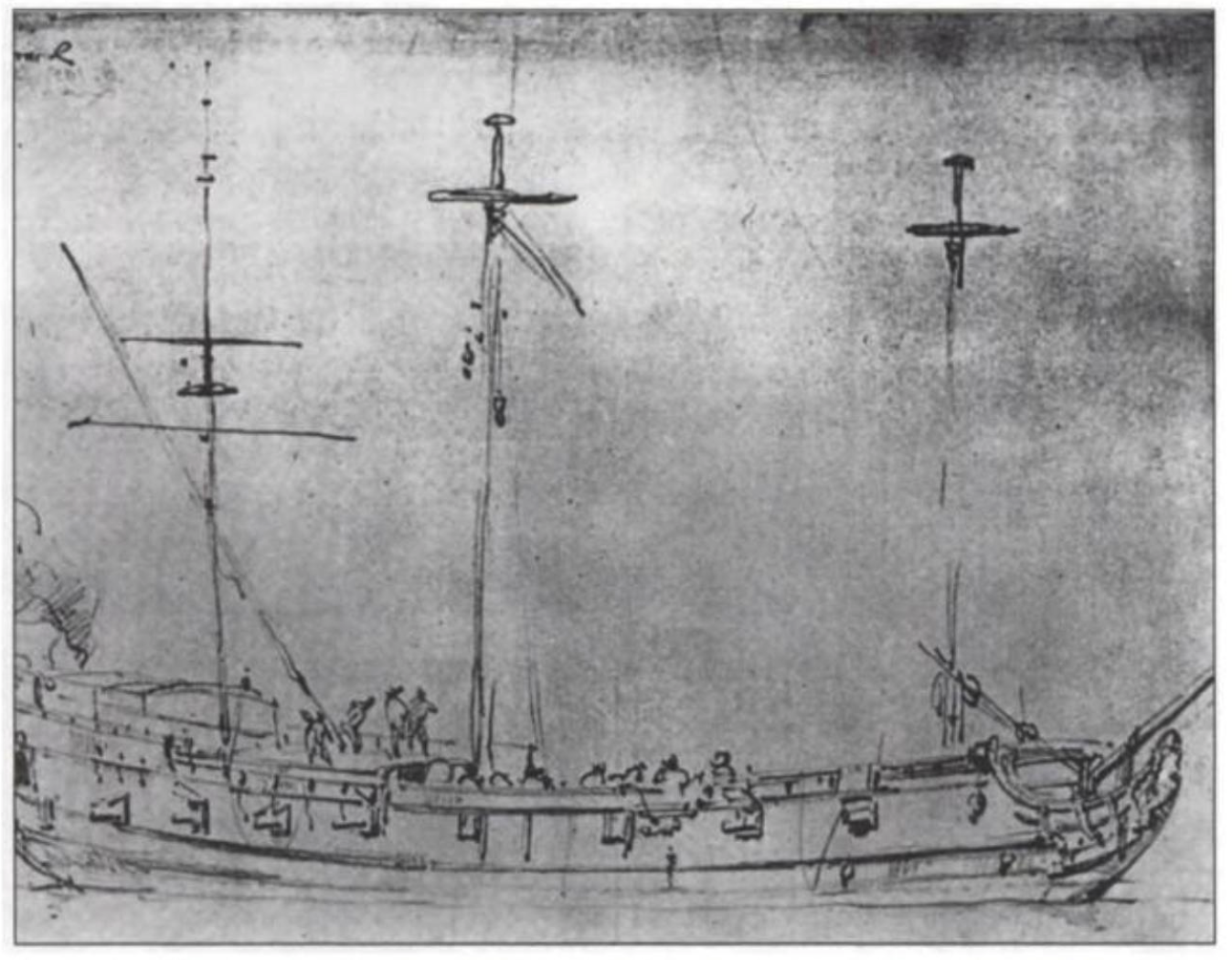
HMS Drake, the ship which captured Bannister

Joseph Bannister (died 1687, first name occasionally given as George) was an English pirate who operated in the Caribbean during the Golden Age of Piracy. He is best known for surviving an attack from two Royal Navy warships.

== History ==
Bannister was captain of the merchant ship Golden Fleece and was tasked with making transatlantic voyages, delivering goods on the profitable route between London and Jamaica at least as early as 1680. In June 1684, Bannister ran away with the ship and its thirty to forty guns, picked up over a hundred men to serve as his crew, and began his career as a pirate.

Bannister soon picked up additional crew and robbed a small Spanish vessel, but governor Thomas Lynch of Jamaica ordered HMS Ruby to give Bannister chase. Ruby was able to capture Bannister and take him to Jamaica where he awaited trial. Bannister maneuvered his way out of all the charges and was released; the sickly Lynch was so agitated by Bannister's escaping punishment that he fell ill and died within the month.

Bannister then engaged in several unprofitable business ventures. Facing financial ruin, in February 1685 he again stole the Golden Fleece. As he left he was briefly questioned by a British ship but protested that he intended to cut logwood, not to enter into piracy. Off Ile-a-Vache he joined a buccaneer flotilla including Laurens de Graaf, Michiel Andrieszoon, Jan Willems, Jacob Evertson, Michel de Grammont, and many others. One of the French buccaneers arranged a fake bill of sale for Golden Fleece so that Bannister, who feared English repercussions if he were caught, would not appear to have been serving under French command. When HMS Ruby located the buccaneer squadron, the Captain questioned Grammont, but Grammont protected Bannister and Ruby was forced to leave. That July the buccaneers sacked Campeche before parting company in September. Bannister continued raiding and capturing ships through the following spring.

The British located Bannister in July 1686 when they found him careening Golden Fleece in Samaná Bay. Bannister faced two British frigates, Falcon and Drake, with a combined fifty-six cannon between them. Bannister placed two separate batteries of guns on island vantage points and battled the navy for two full days, until the warships ran out of ammunition and were forced to retreat. This unlikely victory earned Bannister a place in pirate legend, despite his name being largely lost over the years. Falcon and Drake rearmed and returned to finish Bannister off but found only the burned hulk of Golden Fleece, Bannister having escaped in a prize ship.

The crew of Drake captured Bannister in January 1687 on the Mosquito Coast where he was living with natives. He was taken back to Port Royal, Jamaica, where, fearing another escape, new governor Hender Molesworth had him hanged from the Drake's yardarm without trial even before he could get off the boat.

Joseph Bannister's ship Golden Fleece was found in early 2009 by American shipwreck hunters John Chatterton and John Mattera in the Dominican Republic, at Samaná Bay.

== See also ==
- William Lewis - One of the other pirates captured by Drake; likely fictional, he supposedly served as a boy under Bannister.
