= San Miguel River =

San Miguel River may refer to:

- San Miguel River (Colorado), a tributary of the Dolores River in the U.S. state of Colorado
- San Miguel River (Ecuador and Peru), on the border between Ecuador and Peru
- San Miguel River (Mexico), a tributary of the Sonora River in the Mexican state of Sonora
- San Miguel River (Peru), a tributary of the Marañón River in Peru
- San Miguel River (Colombia), a tributary of the Japurá River in Colombia

== See also ==
- Grande de San Miguel River, El Salvador
- São Miguel River (disambiguation)
