= San Miguel Huautla =

- Municipality and town
- Location in Mexico
- Coordinates: 17°44′N 97°08′W
- Country: Mexico
- State: Oaxaca

Area
  - Total: 111 km^{2} (43 sq mi)

Population (2005)
  - Total: 1,237
- Time zone: UTC-6 (Central Standard Time)

San Miguel Huautla is a town and municipality in Oaxaca in south-western Mexico. The municipality covers an area of 111 km^{2}. It is part of the Nochixtlán District in the southeast of the Mixteca Region.

As of 2005, the municipality had a total population of 1,237.
