= San Miguel del Pino =

Coordinates: 41°30′N 4°54′W

San Miguel del Pino, Spain
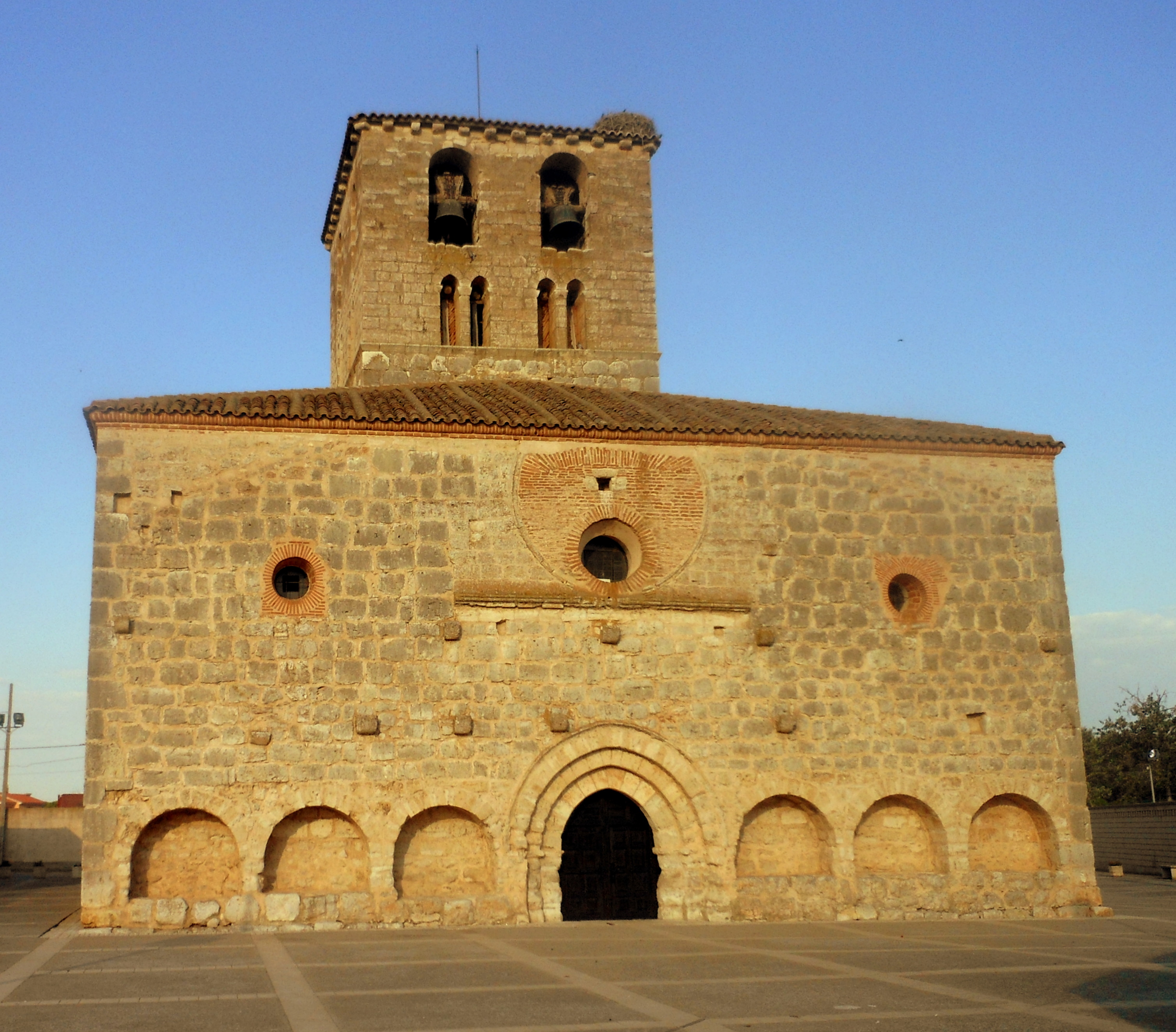
- Church of St. Michael of San Miguel del Pino, Valladolid, Spain in 2013
- Interactive map of San Miguel del Pino, Spain
- Country: Spain
- Autonomous community: Castile and León
- Province: Valladolid
- Municipality: San Miguel del Pino

Area
  - Total: 7 km^{2} (2.7 sq mi)

Population (2025-01-01)
  - Total: 365
  - Density: 52/km^{2} (140/sq mi)
- Time zone: UTC+1 (CET)
  - Summer (DST): UTC+2 (CEST)

San Miguel del Pino is a municipality located in the province of Valladolid, Castile and León, Spain. According to the 2004 census (INE), the municipality has a population of 217 inhabitants.
