= San Miguel de Aguayo =

San Miguel de Aguayo can refer to:

- San Miguel de Aguayo, Texas, also known as Mission San Jose
- San Miguel de Aguayo, Cantabria, Spain
- Marquis de San Miguel de Aguayo, Spanish nobility
