= San Miguel de Serrezuela =

- municipality
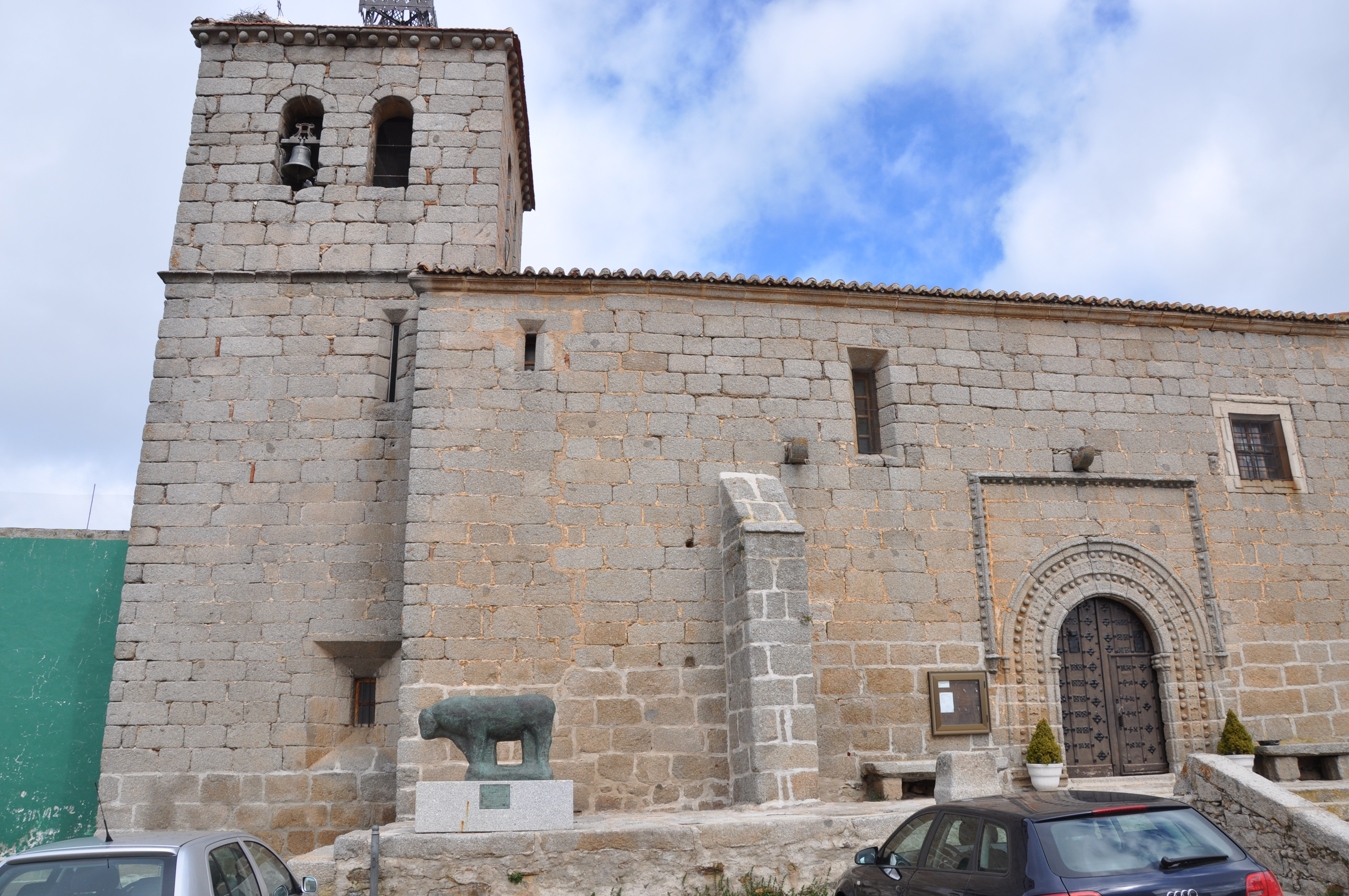
- Church of San Miguel Arcangel in San Miguel de Serrezuela
- Flag Coat of arms
- Location in Spain. San Miguel de Serrezuela (Spain)
- Coordinates: 40°40′13″N 5°17′15″W
- Country: Spain
- Autonomous community: Castile and León
- Province: Ávila
- Municipality: San Miguel de Serrezuela

Area
  - Total: 34 km^{2} (13 sq mi)

Population (2025-01-01)
  - Total: 103
  - Density: 3.0/km^{2} (7.8/sq mi)
- Time zone: UTC+1 (CET)
  - Summer (DST): UTC+2 (CEST)
- Website: Official website

San Miguel de Serrezuela is a municipality located in the province of Ávila, Castile and León, Spain.

== Population ==
Historical population
Year	Pop.	±% p.a.
2023	103	—
2024	106	+2.91%
2025	103	−2.83%
Source: INE
