= Nochixtlán District =

- District
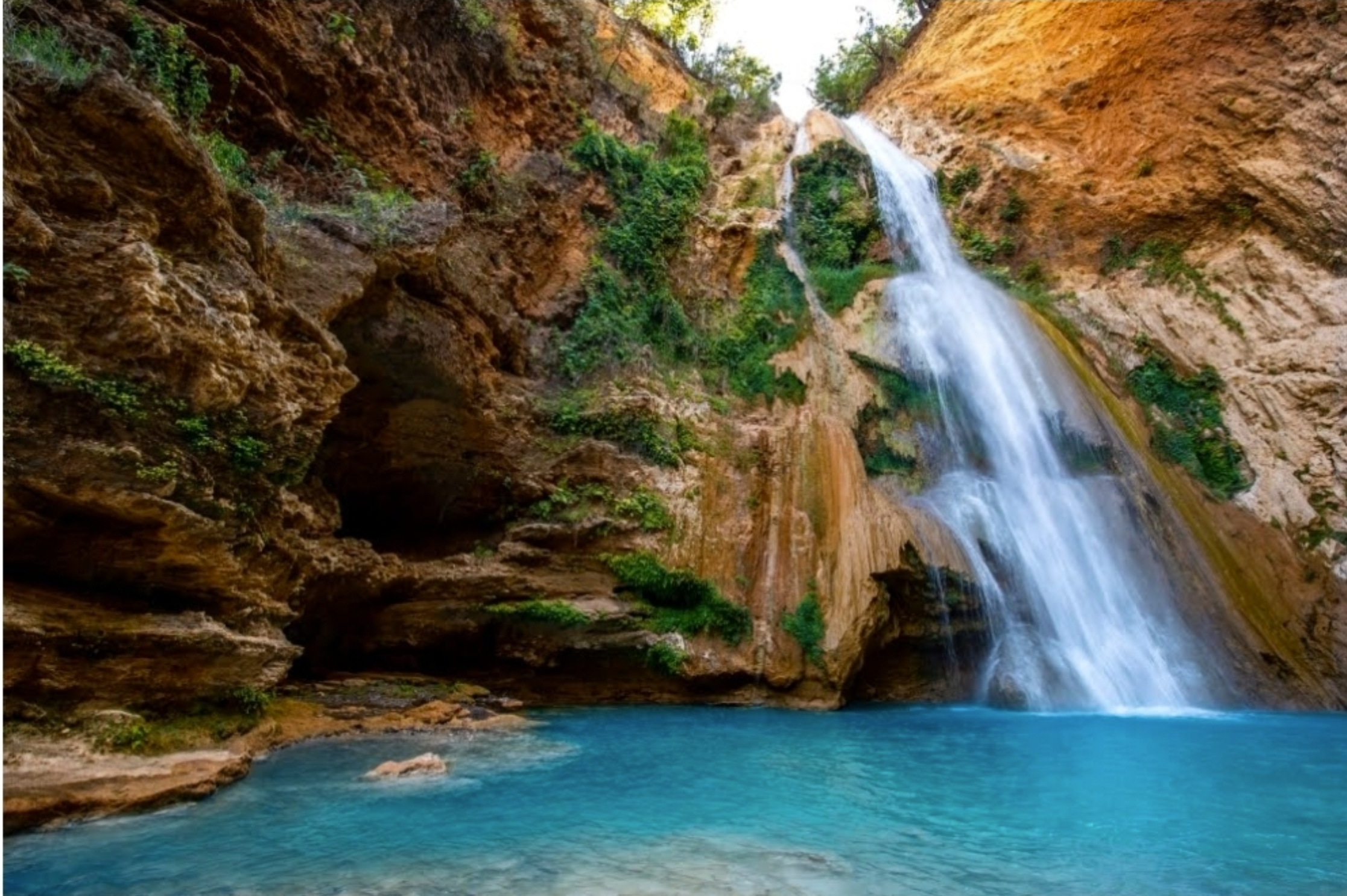
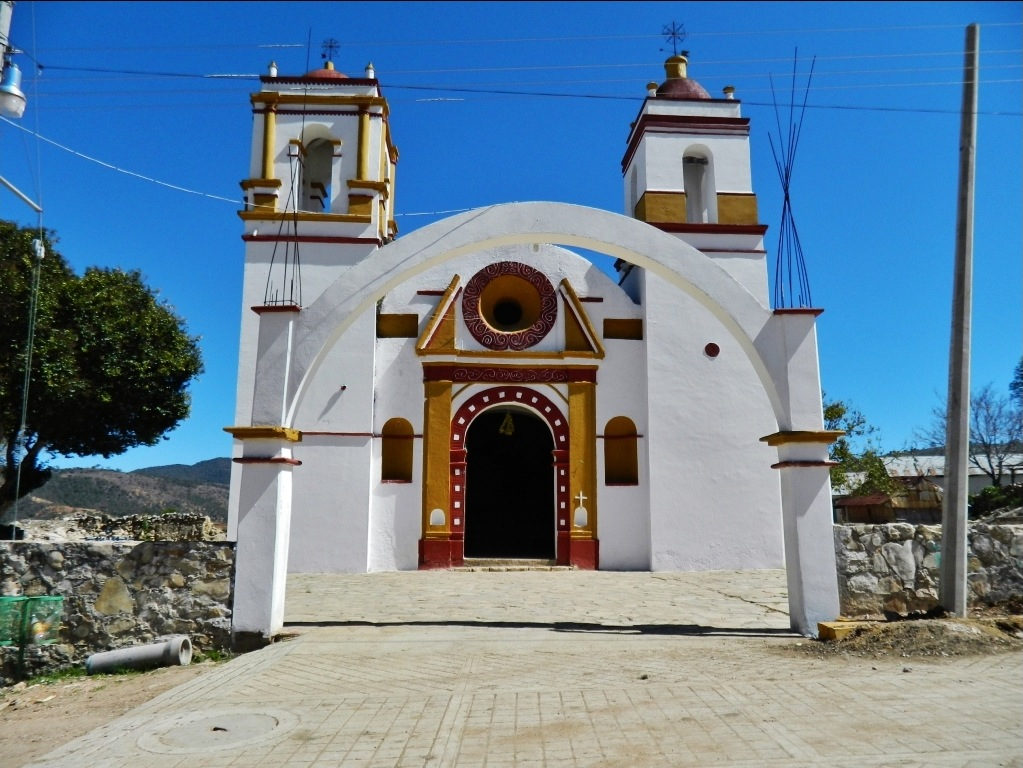
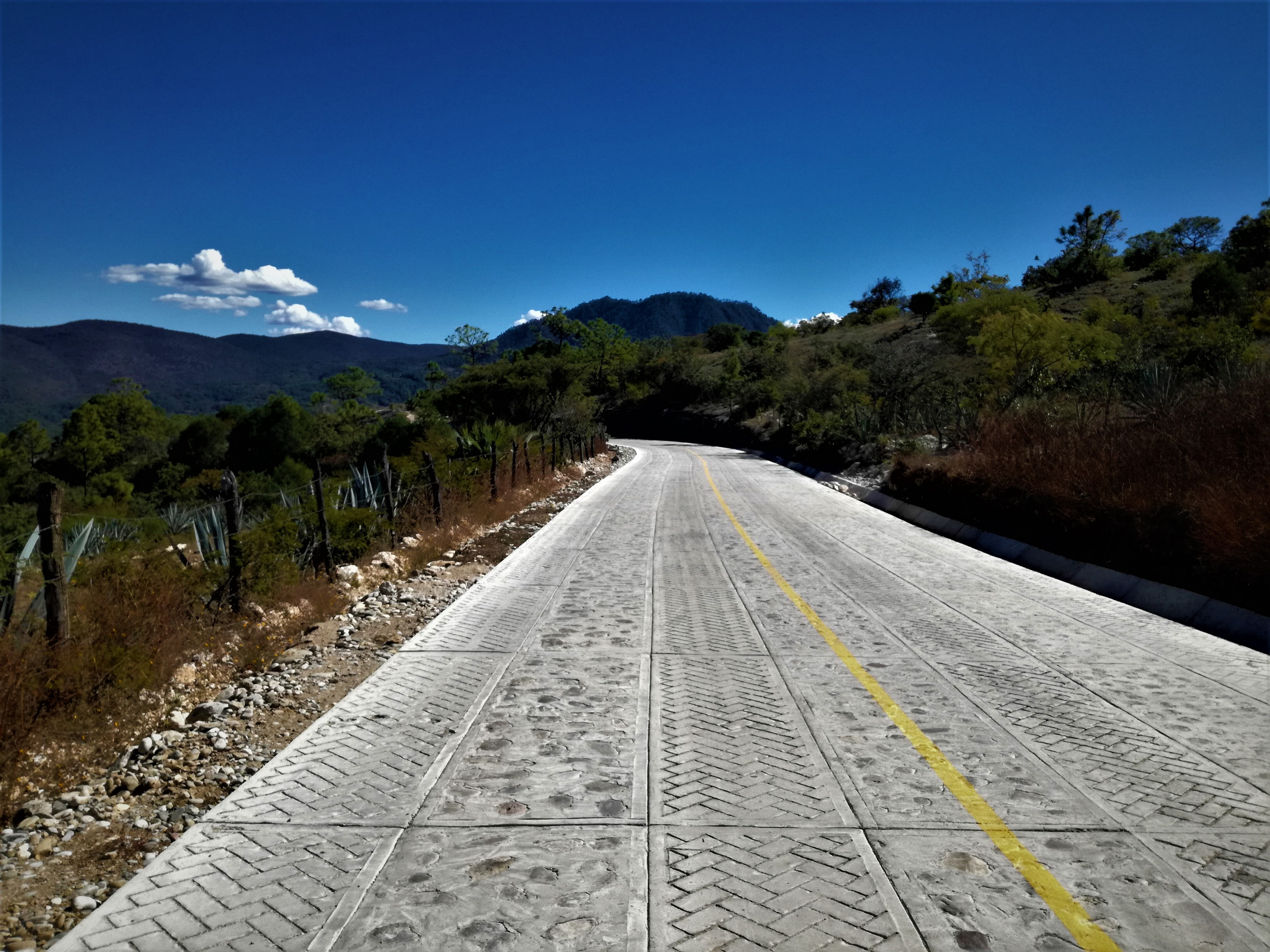
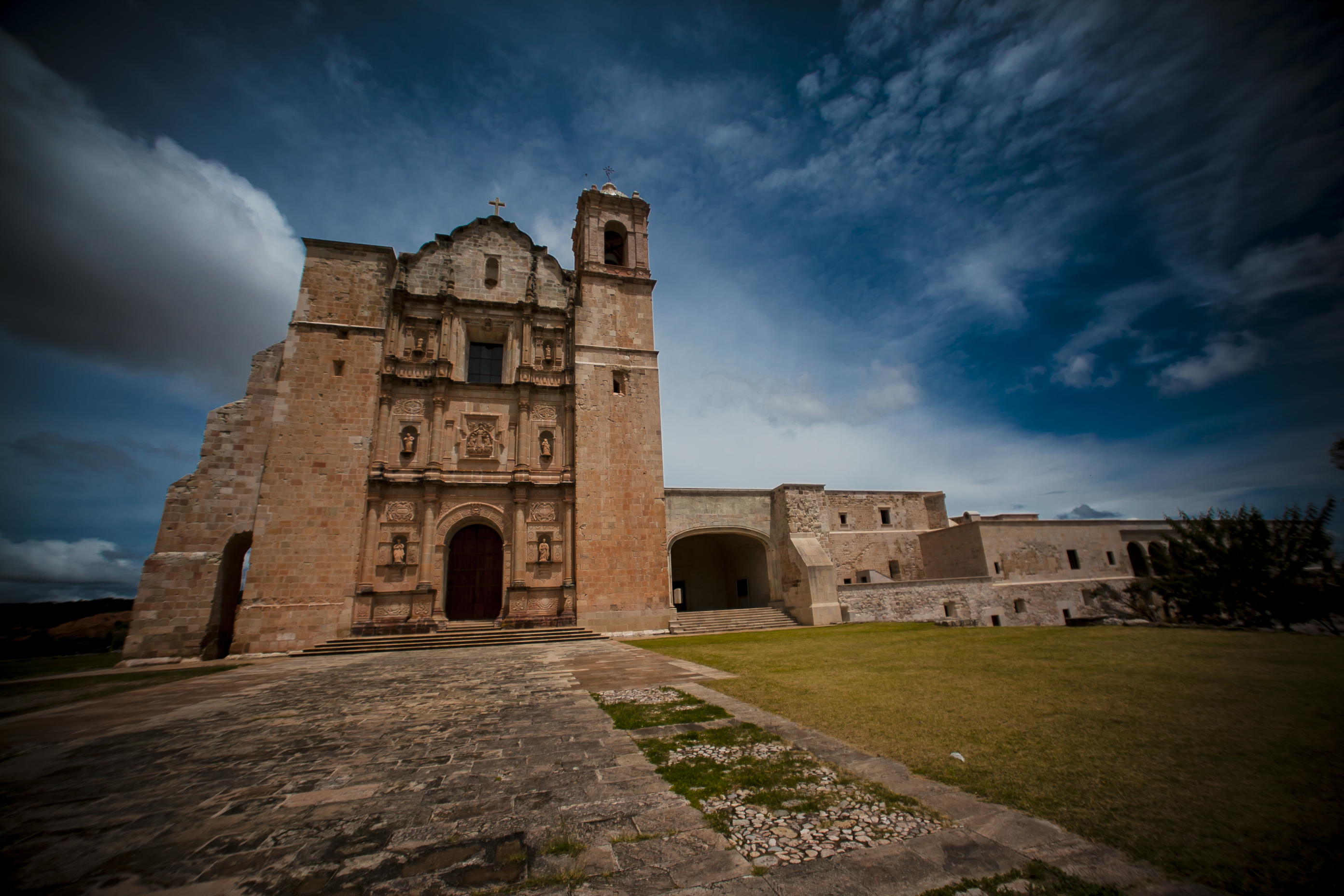
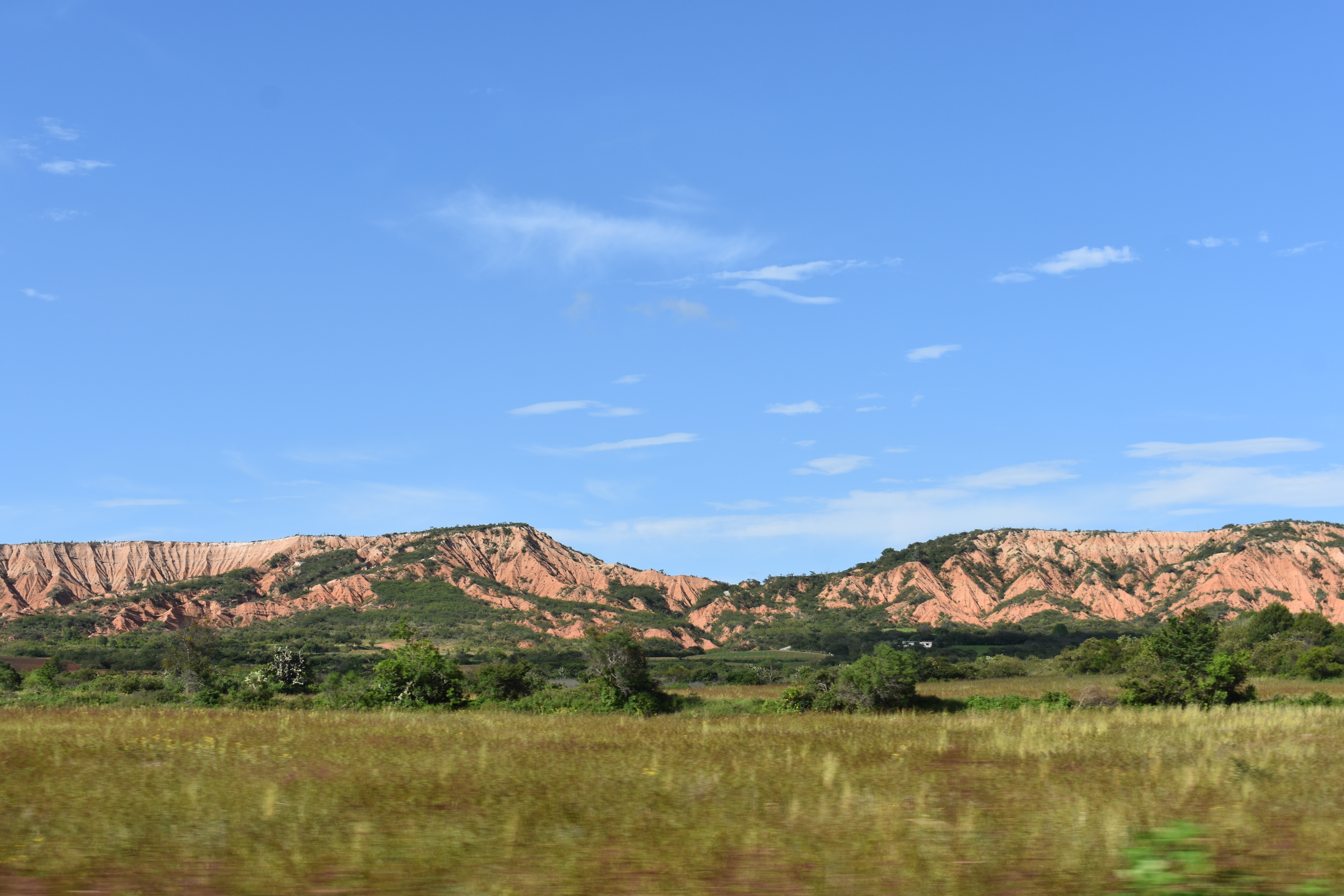
- Top: Santiago Apoala Waterfalls; Middle: Santa María Apazco Church, Yutanduchi-Teozacoalco rural route; Bottom: Temple and Former Convent of Saint Dominic at Santo Domingo Yanhuitlán, San Andés Sinaxtla rural landscape

- Oaxaca regions and districts: Mixteca to Northwest
- Coordinates: 17°27′N 97°13′W
- Country: Mexico
- State: Oaxaca

Population (2020)
  - Total: 60,984

Nochixtlán District is located in the southeast of the Mixteca Region of the State of Oaxaca, Mexico. The main city is Asunción Nochixtlán.

== Municipalities ==
The district includes the following municipalities:

Municipality code	Name	Population		Land Area			Population density	
Municipality code	Name	2020	Rank	km^{2}	sq mi	Rank	2020	Rank
006	Asunción Nochixtlán	20,464	1	343.4	132.6	2	60/km^{2} (154/sq mi)	2
046	Magdalena Jaltepec	2,943	4	234.7	90.6	4	13/km^{2} (32/sq mi)	24
562	Magdalena Yodocono de Porfirio Díaz	1,682	9	39.03	15.07	21	43/km^{2} (112/sq mi)	4
054	Magdalena Zahuatlán	404	29	24.83	9.59	23	16/km^{2} (42/sq mi)	21
094	San Andrés Nuxiño	1,850	8	64	25	16	29/km^{2} (75/sq mi)	10
096	San Andrés Sinaxtla	746	24	22.61	8.73	26	33/km^{2} (87/sq mi)	7
140	San Francisco Chindúa	812	22	22.58	8.72	28	36/km^{2} (93/sq mi)	5
144	San Francisco Jaltepetongo	1,075	17	47.43	18.31	19	23/km^{2} (59/sq mi)	13
147	San Francisco Nuxaño	376	30	22.61	8.73	27	17/km^{2} (43/sq mi)	20
195	San Juan Diuxi	1,056	18	34.90	13.47	22	30/km^{2} (78/sq mi)	9
215	San Juan Sayultepec	879	21	14.56	5.62	31	60/km^{2} (156/sq mi)	1
217	San Juan Tamazola	3,325	3	359.6	138.8	1	9/km^{2} (24/sq mi)	29
224	San Juan Yucuita	643	26	23.39	9.03	25	27/km^{2} (71/sq mi)	11
250	San Mateo Etlatongo	1,239	14	23.50	9.07	24	53/km^{2} (137/sq mi)	3
255	San Mateo Sindihui	1,977	7	141.6	54.7	6	14/km^{2} (36/sq mi)	23
264	San Miguel Chicahua	2,169	6	61.56	23.77	18	35/km^{2} (91/sq mi)	6
274	San Miguel Piedras	1,328	13	65.48	25.28	14	20/km^{2} (53/sq mi)	16
281	San Miguel Tecomatlán	305	31	19.68	7.60	29	15/km^{2} (40/sq mi)	22
304	San Pedro Coxcaltepec Cántaros	716	25	94.68	36.56	8	8/km^{2} (20/sq mi)	30
329	San Pedro Teozacoalco	1,153	16	93	36	9	12/km^{2} (32/sq mi)	26
331	San Pedro Tidaá	982	20	45.95	17.74	20	21/km^{2} (55/sq mi)	15
569	Santa Inés de Zaragoza	1,454	12	83.77	32.34	11	17/km^{2} (45/sq mi)	19
395	Santa María Apazco	1,629	11	80.51	31.09	12	20/km^{2} (52/sq mi)	17
404	Santa María Chachoapam	761	23	61.82	23.87	17	12/km^{2} (32/sq mi)	25
451	Santiago Apoala	1,019	19	85.81	33.13	10	12/km^{2} (31/sq mi)	27
463	Santiago Huauclilla	525	28	100.8	38.9	7	5/km^{2} (13/sq mi)	31
492	Santiago Tilantongo	2,764	5	247.8	95.7	3	11/km^{2} (29/sq mi)	28
493	Santiago Tillo	545	27	17.07	6.59	30	32/km^{2} (83/sq mi)	8
511	Santo Domingo Nuxaá	3,335	2	146.3	56.5	5	23/km^{2} (59/sq mi)	14
523	Santo Domingo Yanhuitlán	1,633	10	69.64	26.89	13	23/km^{2} (61/sq mi)	12
564	Yutanduchi de Guerrero	1,195	15	64.08	24.74	15	19/km^{2} (48/sq mi)	18
	Distrito Nochixtlán	60,984	—	2,757	1,064.48	—	22/km^{2} (57/sq mi)	—
Source: INEGI
