= John Mattera =

American wreck diver and author

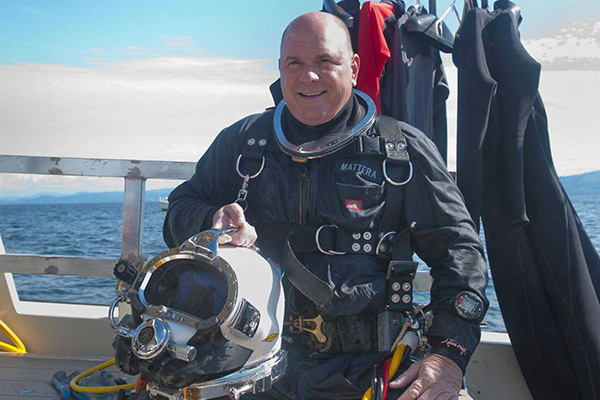
Mattera in 2011

John Joseph Mattera (born 1962) is a writer and American shipwreck explorer and the subject of the book Pirate Hunters by Robert Kurson. Pirate Hunters is the story of two American divers, John Chatterton and John Mattera, finding the lost pirate ship Golden Fleece of Captain Joseph Bannister in the waters off the Dominican Republic in 2008. Mattera first became a certified diver in 1976, exploring the North Atlantic. He was an early pioneer of the shipwrecks in the waters around New York and New Jersey, performing penetration and decompression dives long before technical diving had a name. From the late 1970s on exploring some of the most famous shipwrecks of the northeast, with over 60 dives on the SS Andrea Doria.

Mattera is a former police officer/administrator and has spent over two decades as a security consultant to a client list of the rich and famous, becoming one of the highest paid executive protection specialist in the industry and working in over forty countries. Mattera performed primary security duty on three US and foreign Presidential campaigns. Mattera is also one of the most well known firearms and tactics instructors in the field. Specializing in training for high level executive and dignitary protection.

Mattera has written for Wreck Diver Magazine, African Hunting Gazette, NRA Ring of Freedom Magazine, and other adventure publications.

== Bibliography ==
- Mattera, John (2000). Up To Speed. New York: Zediker Publishing. p. 310. ISBN 0-9626925-8-1.
- Mattera, John (1998). Serious Social Shotguns. New York: Zediker Publishing. p. 279. ISBN 0-9626925-7-3.
- Mattera, John (2019). 29 Minutes: A Dive into the Andrea Doria. New York: Kindle Publishing. p. 65. ASIN B07M6SQDZ7.
- Mattera, John (2018). Pirate Shipwrecks: The Dominican Republic, the Birthplace of the Real Pirates of the Caribbean. New York: Kindle Publishing. p. 69. ASIN B07MM8VCKP.
- Mattera, John (2018). Shipwrecks & Treasure: The Further Adventures of the Pirate hunters. New York: Kindle Publishing. p. 82.
- Mattera, John (2018). Treasure Galleon: The Last Secrets of Nuestra Señora de la Pura y Limpia Concepcion. New York: Kindle Publishing. p. 128. ASIN B07MXQM5JK.
- Mattera, John (2018). Shipwrecks of the Dominican Republic: Warships, slave ships & More adventures on the Silver Bank. New York: Kindle Publishing. p. 166. ASIN B07N2YX126.
