= San Miguel de la Ribera =

Coordinates: 41°20′N 5°34′W

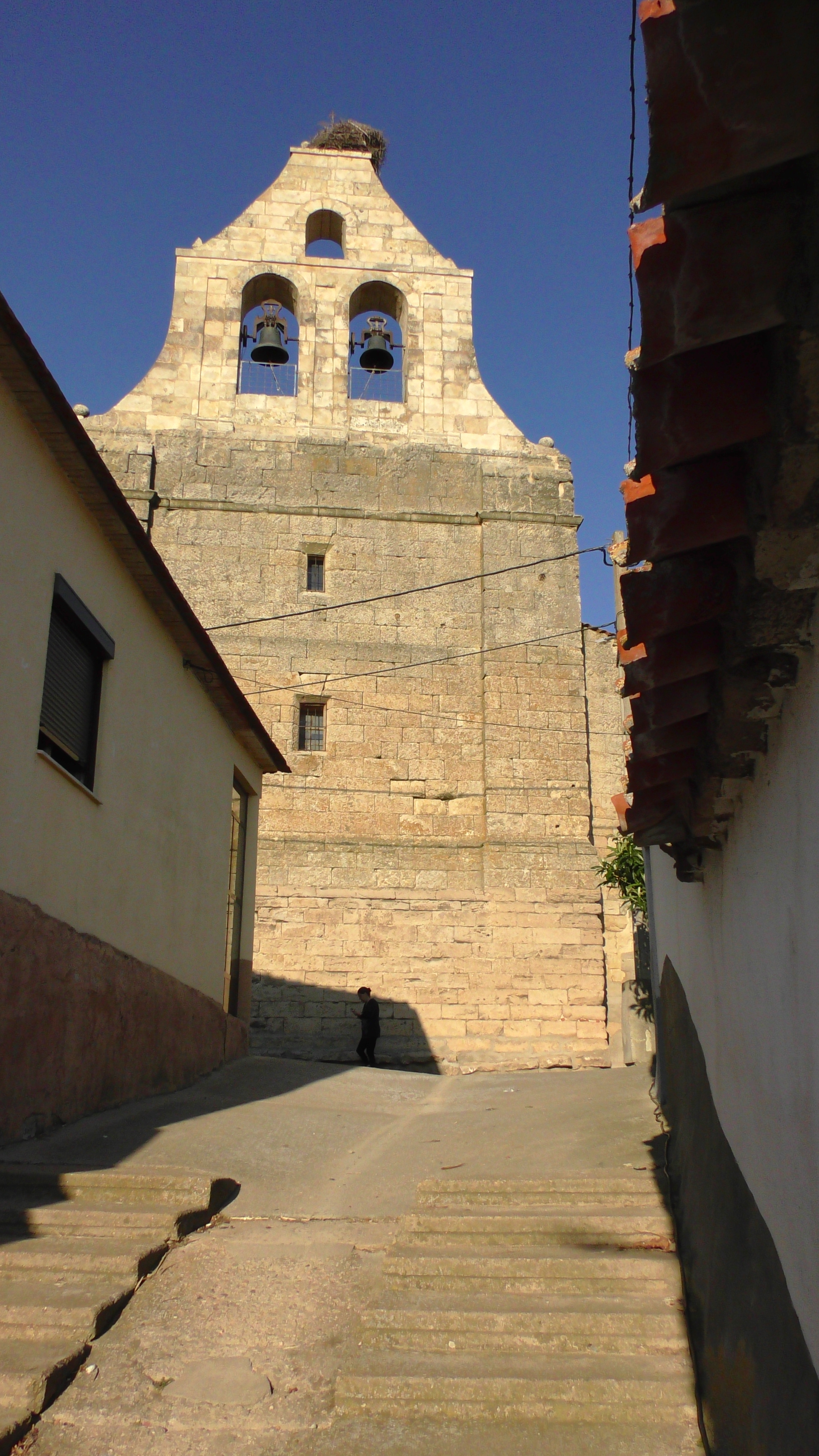

- Flag Coat of arms
- Interactive map of San Miguel de la Ribera
- Country: Spain
- Autonomous community: Castile and León
- Province: Zamora
- Municipality: San Miguel de la Ribera

Area
  - Total: 26 km^{2} (10 sq mi)

Population (2025-01-01)
  - Total: 244
  - Density: 9.4/km^{2} (24/sq mi)
- Time zone: UTC+1 (CET)
  - Summer (DST): UTC+2 (CEST)

San Miguel de la Ribera is a municipality located in the province of Zamora, Castile and León, Spain. According to the 2004 census (INE), the municipality has a population of 374 inhabitants.
