= SS Empire Aldgate =

World War II merchant ship of the United Kingdom

History
- Name: Empire Aldgate (1945-48); Thackeray (1948-51); Sugar Refiner (1951-58); San Patricio (1958-65); San Miguel (1965-68)
- Owner: Ministry of War Transport, United Kingdom (1945-48); Rodney Steamship Co, London (1948-51); Silvertown Services Ltd, London (1951-58); Valck & Monkton, Valparaiso, Chile (1958-62); Worldwide Maritime Co, Liberia (1962-65); Altair Maritime Corporation, Liberia (1965-67)
- Operator: Owner operated except:-; Glen & Co Ltd (1945-48); R S Dalgleish & Co Ltd (1951-53); Kentships Ltd (1953-58)
- Port of registry: West Hartlepool (1945-48); London (1948-58); Valparaiso (1958-62); Liberia (1962-67)
- Builder: W Gray & Co Ltd, West Hartlepool
- Yard number: 1180
- Launched: 10 May 1945
- Completed: July 1945
- Out of service: 12 September 1965
- Identification: UK Official Number 180053 (1945-58); Code letters MPBM (1945-58)

General characteristics
- Tonnage: 3,485 GRT
- Length: 315 ft 5 in (96.14 m)
- Beam: 46 ft 5 in (14.15 m)
- Depth: 22 ft 1 in (6.73 m)
- Propulsion: 1 x triple expansion steam engine (W Gray & Co)

Empire Aldgate was a 3,485-ton, heavy-lift ship which was built in 1945. She was renamed Thackeray in 1948, Sugar Refiner in 1951, San Patricio in 1958, and San Miguel in 1965. She was abandoned by her owners in 1965 and scrapped in 1967.

== History ==
Empire Aldgate was built by W Gray Ltd, West Hartlepool as yard number 1180. She was launched on 10 May 1945 and completed in July. Empire Aldgate was built for the Ministry of War Transport in the United Kingdom and operated under the management of Glen & Co Ltd. In 1948, Empire Alderney was sold to the Rodney Steamship Co, London and renamed Thackeray. She served with them for until 1951 when she was sold to Silvertown Services Ltd, London and renamed Sugar Refiner. She was operated under the management of R S Dalgleish & Co, Newcastle upon Tyne, until January 1953 when management passed to Kentships Ltd.

In 1958, she was sold to Valck & Monkton, Valparaíso, Chile, and renamed San Patricio. They sold her to the Worldwide Maritime Co, Liberia, in 1962. In 1965, San Patricio was sold to the Altair Maritime Corporation, Liberia, who renamed her San Miguel.

On 12 September 1965, San Miguel put into Las Palmas, Canary Islands, due to problems with her boilers. She was en route from Jacksonville, Florida, U.S., to Tarragona, Spain. She was towed to Tarragona in October 1965 and then abandoned by her owners. In August 1967, San Miguel was towed to Cartagena, Spain, where she was scrapped in September of that year.

== Official number and code letters ==
Official Numbers were a forerunner to IMO Numbers.

Empire Aldgate had the UK Official Number 180083 from 1945 to 1958 and used the Code Letters MPBM.
