= English ship Coventry (1658) =

History

England
- Name: Coventry
- Acquired: 1658
- Fate: Captured in 1666

General characteristics
- Tons burthen: 191 tons
- Propulsion: Sails
- Sail plan: Full-rigged ship
- Armament: 28 guns

Coventry was a 28-gun ship of the English Navy. She was originally the Spanish ship San Miguel. She was captured in 1658, but was in turn taken by the French in 1666. She was the first of six ships of the Royal Navy to bear the name Coventry.

The English frigates Constant Warwick and Adventure set sail from Plymouth on 17 February 1658 and put in at St Mary's, Isles of Scilly for a few days. When the Spanish ship San Miguel was sighted they were quickly disguised as merchant ships, but the Spanish fled. The Royal Navy ships chased the Spanish ship and when the wind changed the Spanish ship fired at the Adventure, which had to give up the chase. Next day the Constant Warwick had caught up and after a five-hour battle captured the Spanish ship. The San Miguel was refitted and renamed Coventry. She served for a further eight years before being captured by the French and renamed Armes d'Angleterre.
