= Spanish ship San Miguel (1773) =

History

Spain
- Name: San Miguel
- Launched: 1773
- Captured: October 1782, by Royal Navy

Great Britain
- Name: HMS San Miguel
- Acquired: October 1782
- Fate: Sold, 1791

General characteristics
- Class & type: 74-gun third rate ship of the line
- Tons burthen: 1925 tons
- Length: 176 ft (53.6 m) (gundeck)
- Beam: 49 ft (14.9 m)
- Depth of hold: 21 ft (6.4 m)
- Propulsion: Sails
- Sail plan: Full-rigged ship
- Armament: 74 guns of various weights of shot

San Miguel was a 74-gun ship of the line of the Spanish Navy, launched in 1773.

She was captured by the Royal Navy in October 1782, during the Great Siege of Gibraltar and commissioned as the third rate HMS San Miguel.

A large number of RN ships and British Army units stationed at Gibraltar shared £30000 in bounty and prize money for the destruction of the Floating Batteries before Gibraltar on 13/14 September 1782 and the capture of the San Miguel on 11 October 1782.

She was sold out of the navy in 1791.
