= Pirate Hunters =

2015 book by Robert Kurson

Pirate Hunters: Treasure, Obsession, and the Search for a Legendary Pirate Ship
- First edition
- Author: Robert Kurson
- Language: English
- Genre: Historical non-fiction
- Publisher: Random House
- Publication date: June 2015
- Publication place: United States
- Media type: Hardcover
- ISBN: 9781400063369

Pirate Hunters: Treasure, Obsession, and the Search for a Legendary Pirate Ship is a New York Times best-selling non-fiction book by Robert Kurson recounting the discovery of the pirate ship the Golden Fleece by two American divers, John Chatterton and John Mattera, in Samaná Bay off the north coast of the Dominican Republic in 2008. Until Chatterton and Mattera discovered the resting place of the Golden Fleece, Joseph Bannister's success as a pirate had little modern evidence.

== Plot summary ==
Bannister had been a respected sea captain until he turned pirate. The British government was unable to find Bannister for months until officials found him careening the Golden Fleece in Samaná Bay. Bannister faced two British frigates, the Falcon and the Drake, with a combined fifty-six cannons between them. Bannister placed two separate batteries of guns on island vantage points and battled the navy for two full days, until the warships ran out of ammunition and were forced to retreat.

For over 350 years, the location of the wreck remained a mystery until after a multi-year search Chatterton and Mattera discovered the wreck long removed from where it was supposed to be.
