= San Miguel Beer (disambiguation) =

San Miguel Beer can refer to:

- San Miguel Pale Pilsen, a Filipino beer produced by San Miguel Brewery
  - San Miguel Brewery, a beer producer founded in the Philippines and subsidiary of San Miguel Corporation
  - San Miguel Brewery Hong Kong, a beer producer in Hong Kong and subsidiary of San Miguel Corporation
  - San Miguel Beermen, a PBA basketball team owned by San Miguel Corporation
  - San Miguel Beermen (ABL), an ABL basketball team owned by San Miguel Corporation
- Grupo Mahou-San Miguel, a Spanish brewing company
