= Monastery of St. Michael =

Monastery of St. Michael may refer to:

== Albania ==
- St. Michael's Monastery Church, Nivan

== Germany ==
- Monastery of St. Michael (Heidelberg)
- Rogate Monastery St. Michael

== Italy ==
- Monastery of St. Michael (Murano)

== Ukraine ==
- St. Michael's Golden-Domed Monastery

== United Kingdom ==
- Belmont Abbey, Herefordshire

== See also ==
- Cathedral of Saint Michael (disambiguation)
- Michaelion
- Saint Michael (disambiguation)
- St. Michael's Church (disambiguation)
