= St. Michael's Church =

St. Michael's Church are churches generally named after Michael the Archangel, and include:

== Albania ==
- St. Michael Basilica, Arapaj
- Church of St. Michael (Berat)
- St. Michael's Church, Menshat
- St. Michael Church, Moscopole
- St. Michael's Monastery Church, Nivan

== Australia ==
- St Michael's Anglican Church, Surry Hills, New South Wales
- St Michael's Lutheran Church, Hahndorf, South Australia
- St Michael's Lutheran Church, Tarrington, Victoria
- St Michael's Uniting Church, Melbourne, Victoria

== Austria ==
- Church of Saint Michael, Vienna

== Azerbaijan ==
- Church of Michael the Archangel, Baku

== Barbados ==
- Cathedral Church of Saint Michael and All Angels, Bridgetown

== Belgium ==
- Saint Michael's Church, Ghent

== Bosnia and Herzegovina ==
- Church of St. Archangel Michael, Veličani

== Canada ==
- Church of St. Michael and St. Anthony, Montreal, Quebec
- St. Michel de Sillery Church (Quebec City)

== China ==
- St. Michael's Church, Beijing

== Croatia ==
- Church of Saint Michael, Osijek
- St. Michael's Church (Zadar)

== Cyprus ==
- Archangel Michael Trypiotis Church

== Czech Republic ==
- Church of Saint Michael (Olomouc)

== Eritrea ==
- St. Michael's Cathedral, Keren

== Finland ==
- St Michael's Church, Turku
- St. Michael's Church, Kirkkonummi
- St Michael's Church, Finström

== France ==
- Mont-Saint-Michel
- St. Michael the Archangel Church (Cannes)

== Germany ==
- St. Michael's Church, Aachen, North Rhine-Westphalia
- St. Michael in Berg am Laim, Munich, Bavaria
- St Michael's Church, Erfurt, Thuringia
- St. Michael's Church, Fulda, Hesse
- St. Michael's Church, Hamburg
- St. Michael's Church, Hildesheim, Lower Saxony
- St. Michael, Kaubenheim, Bavaria
- St. Michaelis, Lüneburg, Lower Saxony
- St. Michael's Church, Munich, Bavaria

== India ==
- St. Michael's Church, Mumbai
- St Michael's Church, Pazhayidom, Kerala

== Ireland ==
- St. Michael's Church, Ballinasloe
- St Michael's Church, Creeslough
- Saint Michael's Catholic Church (Limerick)

== Italy ==
- Sanctuary of Monte Sant'Angelo
- San Michele Arcangelo a Pietralata, Rome
- San Michele Arcangelo ai Corridori di Borgo, Rome
- San Michele Arcangelo ai Minoriti, Catania
- Sacra di San Michele, Sant'Ambrogio (TO)

== Lithuania ==
- Church of St. Michael, Vilnius
- Church of St. Michael the Archangel, Kaunas
- Church of St. Constantine and St. Michael, Vilnius

== Luxembourg ==
- Saint Michael's Church, Luxembourg, Luxembourg City

== Macedonia ==
- Church of St. Michael, Štip

== Malta ==
- St Michael's Chapel, Mqabba
- Chapel of San Mikiel Is-Sanċir

== New Zealand ==
- St Michael's Church, Waimea West

== Pakistan ==
- St Michael's Church, Peshawar

== Philippines ==
- San Miguel Arcangel Church (Marilao), Bulacan
- San Miguel Arcangel Church (Masantol), Pampanga
- San Miguel Arcangel Church (San Miguel, Bulacan)

== Poland ==
- Church of St. Michael the Archangel, Katowice
- Church of St. Michael the Archangel, Nosów

== Portugal ==
- Church of St. Michael the Archangel, Juncal

== Puerto Rico ==
- San Miguel Arcángel Church (Cabo Rojo)

== Romania ==
- St. Michael's Church, Cluj-Napoca, Transylvania

== Russia ==
- Cathedral of the Archangel, Moscow
- Saint Michael's Cathedral, Sochi

== Spain ==
- Church of San Miguel (Cogolludo), Castile-La Mancha
- Church of San Miguel (Jerez de la Frontera), Andalusia
- Pontifical Basilica of St. Michael, Madrid, Comunidad Autónoma de Madrid
- Church of San Miguel, Mota del Cuervo, Cuenca
- Church of San Miguel, Vitoria-Gasteiz, Basque Country
- Church of the Monastery of San Miguel de Bárcena, Asturias

== Thailand ==
- St Michael's Church, Songyae

== Ukraine ==
- Church of the Archangel Michael, Chernihiv
- Saint Michael Church, Kotsiubyntsi
- Saint Michael church, Verbiatyn
- St. Michael's Cathedral (Cherkasy)
- St. Michael's Golden-Domed Monastery, Kyiv

== United Arab Emirates ==
- St. Michael's Catholic Church, Sharjah

== United Kingdom ==
=== England ===
==== Berkshire ====
- Church of St Michael, Tilehurst

==== Bristol ====
- St Michael on the Mount Without
- St Michael's Church, Winterbourne

==== Cambridgeshire ====
- St Michael's Church, Longstanton

==== Cheshire ====
- St Michael's Church, Baddiley
- St Mary's and St Michael's Church, Burleydam
- St Michael's Church, Chester
- St Michael's Church, Coppenhall, Crewe
- St Michael's Church, Ditton, Widnes
- St Michael's Church, Hulme Walfield
- St Michael's Church, Macclesfield
- St Michael's Church, Marbury
- St Michael's Church, North Rode
- St Michael's Church, Shotwick
- St Michael's Church, Wincle

==== Cornwall ====
- St Michael's Mount

==== Cumbria ====
- St Michael's Church, Barton
- St Michael's Church, Isel
- St Michael's Church, Bootle
- St Michael's Church, Bowness-on-Solway
- St Michael's Church, Burgh by Sands
- St Mary and St Michael's Church, Great Urswick
- St Michael's Church, Muncaster
- St Michael's Church, Pennington
- St Michael's Church, Torpenhow
- St Michael's Church, Workington

==== Derbyshire ====
- St Michael and All Angels' Church, Hathersage

==== Devon ====
- St Michael's Church, Axmouth

==== Dorset ====
- St Michael's Church, Bournemouth
- St Michael's Church, Lyme Regis

==== East Sussex ====
- St Michael's Church, Brighton

==== Essex ====
- St Michael's Church, Aveley
- St Michael's Church, Berechurch

==== Gloucestershire ====
- St Michael's Church, Duntisbourne Rouse
- St Michael and St Martin's Church, Eastleach Martin

==== Greater Manchester ====
- St Michael's Church, Middleton
- St Michael and All Angels Church, Mottram

==== Hampshire ====
- St Michael's Church, Basingstoke
- St. Michael's Church, Southampton

==== Herefordshire ====
- St Michael's Church, Michaelchurch

==== Hertfordshire ====
- St Michael's Church, St Albans

==== Isle of Wight ====
- Church of St Michael the Archangel, Shalfleet

==== Kent ====
- St Michael's Church, East Peckham
- St Michael the Archangel Church, Chatham

==== Lancashire ====
- St Michael's Church, Aughton
- Church of St Mary and St Michael, Bonds
- St Michael's Church, Bracewell
- St Michael's Church, Cockerham
- St Michael's Church, Grimsargh
- St Michael's Church, Kirkham
- St Michael's Chapel, Lancaster Moor Hospital
- St Michael's Church, St Michael's on Wyre
- St Michael's Church, Whittington

==== Leicestershire ====
- St Michael's Church, Stretton en le Field

==== Lincolnshire ====
- St Michael's Church, Buslingthorpe
- St Michael-on-the-Mount, Lincoln
- St Michael's Church, Waddington

==== London ====
- St Michael Bassishaw
- St Michael, Cornhill
- St Michael Paternoster Royal
- St Michael Queenhithe
- St Michael Wood Street
- St Michael's Church, Camden Town
- St Michael's Church, Chester Square
- St Michael's Church, Highgate

==== Merseyside ====
- St Michael's Church, Aigburth, Liverpool
- St Michael's Church, Garston, Liverpool

==== Norfolk ====
- Church of St Michael, Aylsham
- St Michael the Archangel's Church, Booton

==== Northamptonshire ====
- St Michael's Church, Upton, Northampton

==== Nottinghamshire ====
- St Michael's Church, Cotham
- St Michael's Church, Sutton Bonington

==== Oxfordshire ====
- St Michael at the North Gate, Oxford

==== Shropshire ====
- St Michael's Church, High Ercall
- St Michael's Church, Upton Cressett

==== Somerset ====
- St Michael's Church, Bath
- St Michael's Church, Brent Knoll
- Burrow Mump (ruined)
- Church of St Michael the Archangel, Compton Martin
- Glastonbury Tor (ruined)
- St Michael's Church, Monkton Combe
- Church of St Michael, Wayford

==== Suffolk ====
- Church of St Michael the Archangel, Framlingham

==== Tyne and Wear ====
- St Michael's Church, Elswick

==== West Midlands ====
- St Michael's Church, Handsworth
- St Michael's Catholic Church, Moor Street, Birmingham

==== Wiltshire ====
- St Michael's Church, Melksham

==== Worcestershire ====
- St Michael's Church, Bricklehampton
- St Michael's Church, Churchill

==== Yorkshire ====
- St Michael le Belfrey, York
- St Michael's Church, Cowthorpe, North Yorkshire
- St Michael's Church, Kirkby Malham, North Yorkshire
- St Michael's Church, North Otterington, North Yorkshire
- St Michael's Church, Sawley, North Yorkshire
- Church of St Michael and All Angels, Sutton upon Derwent, East Riding of Yorkshire
- St Michael's Church, Well, North Yorkshire

=== Scotland ===
- St Michael's Parish Church, Linlithgow, West Lothian

=== Wales ===
- St Michael's Church, Brynford, Flintshire
- Church of St Michael, Cilycwm, Carmarthenshire
- St Michael's Church, Llanfihangel Din Sylwy, Anglesey
- St Michael's Church, Llanvihangel Crucorney, Monmouthshire
- St Michael's Church, Llanfihangel Tor-y-Mynydd, Monmouthshire
- St Michael's Church, Llantarnam, Torfaen
- St Michael's Church, Manafon, Powys
- St Michael's Church, Myddfai, Carmarthenshire
- St Michael's Church, Penbryn, Ceredigion
- St Michael's Church, Penrhoslligwy, Anglesey
- St Michael's Church, Tremain, Ceredigion

=== Isle of Man ===
- St Michael's Church, Kirk Michael, Michael

== United States ==
=== Alaska ===
- St. Michael the Archangel Church (Cordova, Alaska)

=== Connecticut ===
- St. Michael the Archangel's Parish (Bridgeport, Connecticut)

=== Florida ===
- Basilica of St. Michael the Archangel (Pensacola, Florida)

=== Georgia ===
- St. Michael the Archangel Roman Catholic Church (Woodstock, Georgia)

=== Hawaii ===
- St. Michael the Archangel Church (Kailua-Kona, Hawaii)
- Saint Michael Catholic Church in Waialua

=== Illinois ===
- Saint Michael the Archangel Catholic Church (Chicago)
- St. Michael's Church, Old Town, Chicago
- Saint Michael's Catholic Church (Galena, Illinois)
- St. Michael Catholic Church (Wheaton, Illinois)

=== Iowa ===
- St. Michael's Catholic Church (Holbrook, Iowa)

=== Maryland ===
- St. Michael the Archangel Ukrainian Catholic Church, Overlea
- St. Michael's Church Complex, Baltimore
- St. Michael's Church (Reisterstown, Maryland)

=== Massachusetts ===
- St. Michael's Church (Marblehead, Massachusetts)

=== New Jersey ===
- St. Michael's Church (Trenton, New Jersey)

=== New York ===
- Church of St. Michael (34th Street, Manhattan), New York City
- St. Michael's Church (Brooklyn), New York City
- St. Michael's Episcopal Church (Manhattan), New York City
- Saint Michael's Church (Rochester, New York)

=== North Dakota ===
- St. Michael's Church (Grand Forks, North Dakota)

=== Ohio ===
- St. Michael and All Angels Episcopal Church, formerly known as Grace Church (Cincinnati, Ohio)
- St. Michael the Archangel Church (Cincinnati, Ohio)
- St. Michael the Archangel Church (Cleveland, Ohio)
- St. Michael Byzantine Catholic Church Toledo, Toledo
- Saint Michael's of the Ridge Roman Catholic Church, Toledo
- St. Michael’s Church (Fort Laramie, Ohio)

=== Pennsylvania ===
- St. Michael's Evangelical Lutheran Church (Mt. Airy), in Germantown

=== Rhode Island ===
- St. Michael's Roman Catholic Church, Convent, Rectory, and School, Providence

=== South Carolina ===
- St. Michael's Anglican Church (Charleston, South Carolina), formerly Episcopal

=== Tennessee ===
- St. Michael's Catholic Church (Cedar Hill, Tennessee)

== See also ==
- Cathedral of Saint Michael (disambiguation)
- Michaelion
- Saint Michael (disambiguation)
- St. Michael's Catholic Church (disambiguation)
- St. Michael's Episcopal Church (disambiguation)
- St. Michael and All Angels Church (disambiguation)
- St. Mary and St. Michael's Church (disambiguation)
- St. Michael the Archangel's Church (disambiguation)
