= San Miguel Cathedral =

San Miguel Cathedral may refer to:

- San Miguel Cathedral Basilica of Queen of Peace, San Miguel, El Salvador
- San Miguel Arcangel Metropolitan Cathedral, Tegucigalpa, Honduras
- San Miguel Arcangel Metropolitan Cathedral, Piura, Peru
- San Miguel Arcangel Cathedral, Gamu, Philippines
- San Miguel de Tucuman Cathedral, Tucuman, Argentina

== See also ==
- Michael (archangel) or San Miguel
- Cathedral of Saint Michael (disambiguation)
- St. Michael's Church (disambiguation)
- Saint Michael (disambiguation)
