= St. Michael's Catholic Church =

St. Michael's Catholic Church may refer to:

== Australia ==
- St Michael's Catholic Church, Nowra, New South Wales

== Ireland ==
- Saint Michael's Catholic Church (Limerick)

== New Zealand ==
- St Michael's Catholic Church, Auckland

== United Arab Emirates ==
- St. Michael's Catholic Church, Sharjah

== United Kingdom ==
- St Michael's Catholic Church, Moor Street

== United States ==
- Saint Michael's Catholic Church (Galena, Illinois)
- St. Michael's Catholic Church (Holbrook, Iowa), listed on the National Register of Historic Places (NRHP)
- St. Michael's Catholic Church (Port Austin, Michigan), NRHP-listed in Huron County
- St. Michael's Catholic Church (Tarnov, Nebraska), NRHP-listed
- St. Michael's Catholic Church (Mechanicsburg, Ohio), NRHP-listed
- St. Michael's Catholic Church (Cedar Hill, Tennessee), NRHP-listed
- St. Michael's Catholic Church (Cuero, Texas), NRHP-listed in De Witt County

== See also ==
- St. Michael's Church (disambiguation)
