= Cathedral of St Michael and St George =

St Michael and St George Cathedral may refer to:

- Cathedral of St Michael and St George, Aldershot, a Roman Catholic cathedral in England
- St Michael and St George Cathedral, Grahamstown, an Anglican cathedral in South Africa

== See also ==
- Saint Michael and Saint George (disambiguation)
- Cathedral of Saint Michael (disambiguation)
- St. George's Cathedral (disambiguation)
- Saint Michael (disambiguation)
- Saint George (disambiguation)
