= Saint Michael (disambiguation) =

Saint Michael originally refers to the archangel Michael, who appears in the Bible as a heavenly being.

Saint Michael or Saint Michaels may also refer to:

== Saints ==
- Michael of Synnada (died 826), Byzantine bishop of Synnnada
- Michael Maleinos (c. 894–963), Byzantine monk

=== Eastern Orthodox ===
- Boris I of Bulgaria (died 907), baptised as Michael, knyaz of Bulgaria from 852 to 889
- Metropolitan Michael I of Kiev (died 992), first metropolitan of Kiev and All Russia
- Michael of Chernigov (c. 1185–1246), Russian prince of various principalities, including being Grand Prince of Kiev, and martyr
- Mikhail of Tver (1271–1318), Grand Prince of Vladimir
- Michael of Klopsk (died c. 1458), Russian monk

=== Roman Catholic ===
- Michael de Sanctis (1591–1625), Spanish Trinitarian
- Michel Garicoïts (1797–1863), French Basque founder of the Society of Priests of the Sacred Heart of Betharram
- Michael Hồ Đình Hy (1808–1857), Vietnamese martyr
- Michał Kozal (1893–1943), Polish bishop and martyr
- Michał Sopoćko (1888–1975), Polish confessor of Faustina Kowalska and Apostle of Divine Mercy

== Organisations ==
- Order of Saint Michael, a French chivalric order
- Order of Saint Michael (Bavaria), a Bavarian chivalric order
- Order of St Michael and St George, a British chivalric order
- Pilgrims of Saint Michael, a Roman Catholic organization in Canada

== Places ==
=== Austria ===
- Sankt Michael im Burgenland
- Sankt Michael im Lungau
- Sankt Michael in Obersteiermark

=== United Kingdom ===
==== Settlements ====
- Barford St Michael, Oxfordshire
- Creech St Michael, Somerset
- Gussage St Michael, Dorset
- Kington St Michael, Chippenham, Wiltshire
- Ormesby St Michael, Norfolk
- Seavington St Michael, Somerset
- St Michael Caerhays, Cornwall
- St Michael Penkevil, Cornwall
- St Michael's Hamlet, Merseyside
  - St Michaels railway station
- St Michael's on Wyre, Lancashire
- St Michaels, Kent
- Stoke St Michael, Somerset

==== Other places ====
- St. Michael's, Coventry, an electoral ward in Coventry, West Midlands
- St Michael, Hertfordshire, a civil parish by St Albans
- St Michael's (Liverpool ward), a Liverpool City Council ward
- St Michael's Isle, Isle of Man
- St Michael's, Manchester
- St. Michael's (Manchester ward), a former Manchester City Council ward
- St Michael's Mount, an island in Cornwall
- St Michael's Street, Oxford, a street in Oxford

=== United States ===
- St. Michael, Alaska
  - St. Michael Island, the island on which the city of St. Michael is located
- St. Michael, Minnesota
- Saint Michael, Nebraska
- Saint Michael, North Dakota
- St. Michael-Sidman, Pennsylvania
- St. Michaels, Arizona
- Saint Michaels, Maryland
- Saint Michaels, Wisconsin
- St. Michael, US Virgin Islands

=== Elsewhere ===
- Mont-Saint-Michel (Saint Michael's Mount, Normandy, France)
- Saint Michael, Barbados
- St. Michael's Cave, Gibraltar
- St. Michaels, County Cork, a civil parish of Ireland
- St. Michaels, County Kildare, a civil parish of Ireland
- St. Michaels, County Wexford, a civil parish of Ireland
- St Michael's-on-sea, a seaside village in KwaZulu-Natal, South Africa
- St. Michael, Alberta, a hamlet in Alberta, Canada
- St Michael's, common English name for São Miguel Island, Azores

== Churches ==
- Cathedral of Saint Michael (disambiguation)
- St. Michael's Church (disambiguation)
- St. Michael's Episcopal Church (disambiguation)
- San Miguel Cathedral (disambiguation)
- St Michael's Abbey, Farnborough, Hampshire, UK
- St Michael at Germia, Byzantine shrine in Turkey
- Saint Michael's Basilica, Bordeaux, France
- St. Michael's Basilica, Miramichi, Chatham, New Brunswick, Canada
- St. Michael's Cathedral Basilica (Toronto), Ontario, Canada
- St. Michael Chapel, Košice, Slovakia
- St Michael's Chapel, a ruined chapel, Faslane, Scotland
- St. Michael's Golden-Domed Monastery, Kiev, Ukraine
- Saint Michael Parish, Denmark
- Mount Saint Michael, a Catholic church establishment in Spokane, Washington, US

== Other structures ==
- Fort Saint Michael, Malta
- Saint Michael's Castle, a former royal residence, St. Petersburg, Russia
- St. Michael's Catholic Cemetery, a private cemetery in Happy Valley, Hong Kong
- St. Michael's Hospital (disambiguation)
- Saint Michael's Bus Terminal, a bus terminal in Whampoa, Singapore

== Education ==
- St. Michael Academy (disambiguation)
- St. Michael's College (disambiguation)
- St. Michael's School (disambiguation)
- St. Michael's Institution, Ipoh, Malaysia
- St. Michaels University School, Victoria, Canada
- Institution Saint-Michel, Solesmes, France

== Sports ==
- Boldmere St. Michaels F.C., England
- St. Michael's A.F.C., a junior association football club in Tipperary, Ireland
- St. Michael's Buzzers, a Tier II Junior "A" ice hockey team from Toronto, Ontario, Canada
- St Michael's GAA (disambiguation), several Gaelic games clubs
- Mississauga St. Michael's Majors, an Ontario Hockey League (Canada) team that moved to Mississauga from Toronto in 2007
- Toronto St. Michael's Majors, an OHA/OHL team that had been in Toronto, Canada, for 100 years
- St. Michael's College School Arena, Toronto, Canada

== Other ==
- St. Michael the Archangel (catamaran), a pre-modern Western multi-hull ship
- Saint Michael (Giordano), a painting of c. 1633
- Saint Michael (Raphael), a painting of 1504
- St Michael (brand), a former brand of the British retailer Marks & Spencer

== See also ==
- Saint-Michel (disambiguation), French
- San Miguel (disambiguation), Spanish
- San Michele (disambiguation), Italian
- São Miguel (disambiguation), Portuguese
- Saint Michael and Saint George (disambiguation)
- Michael (disambiguation)
