= Cathedral of Saint Michael =

Cathedral of Saint Michael, or St. Michael's Cathedral, may refer to:

== Australia ==
- Cathedral of St Michael and St John, Bathurst
- St Michael's Cathedral, Wagga Wagga
- St Michael's Cathedral, Wollongong

== India ==
- Cathedral of St. Michael and St. Joseph, in Shimla, Himachal Pradesh; a cathedral in India
- St. Michael's Cathedral, Coimbatore, in Tamil Nadu; a cathedral in India
- Cathedral of St. Michael, Raigarh, in Chhattisgarh; a cathedral in India
- Cathedral of St. Michael, Khunti, in Jharkhand; a cathedral in India
- St. Michael's Cathedral, Kodungallur, in Kerala; a cathedral in India

== Russia ==
- St. Michael's Cathedral (Izhevsk)
- Cathedral of the Archangel, Moscow
- Saint Michael's Cathedral, Sochi

== Ukraine ==
- St. Michael's Cathedral (Cherkasy)
- St. Michael's Golden-Domed Monastery, Kyiv

== United Kingdom ==
- Cathedral of St Michael and St George, Aldershot, England
- Coventry Cathedral (St Michael's Cathedral), Coventry, England

== United States ==
- St. Michael's Cathedral (Sitka, Alaska)
- St. Michael's Episcopal Cathedral (Boise, Idaho)
- St. Michael's Cathedral (Springfield, Massachusetts)
- Cathedral of St. Michael the Archangel (Passaic, New Jersey)

== Other countries ==
- Cathedral Church of Saint Michael and All Angels, Barbados
- St. Michael and Gudula Cathedral, Brussels, Belgium
- St. Michael's Cathedral Basilica, Toronto, Canada
- St. Michael's Cathedral, Qingdao, China
- St. Michel's Cathedral, Carcassonne, France
- St. Michael's Cathedral, Rikitea, French Polynesia
- St. Michael's Cathedral, Veszprém, Hungary
- Cathedral of St. Michael the Archangel, Albenga, Italy
- St. Michael's Cathedral, Belgrade, Serbia
- St Michael and St George Cathedral, Makhanda, South Africa
- St. Michael's Cathedral, Iligan City, Philippines
- St. Michael's Cathedral, Łomża, Poland
- St. Michael's Cathedral, Alba Iulia, Romania

== See also ==
- Michaelion
- Cathedral of St Michael and St George (disambiguation)
- St. Michael's Church (disambiguation)
- Saint Michael (disambiguation)
- San Miguel Cathedral (disambiguation)
