= St. Michael's College =

St. Michael's College may refer to:

Asia

- Saint Michael's College of Laguna, Biñan, Laguna, Philippines
- St. Michael's College (Iligan), a Catholic private school in Iligan City, Philippines
- St. Michael's College National School, Batticaloa, Sri Lanka

Europe

- St Michael's College, Dublin, Ireland, a private Catholic primary and secondary school
- St Michael's College, Enniskillen, Northern Ireland, a Catholic boys' secondary school
- St Michael's College, Listowel, County Kerry, Ireland, a Catholic boys' secondary school
- St. Michael's College, Llandaff, Wales, an Anglican theological college
- St Michael's College, Tenbury (1856–1985), a college for boys in Worcestershire, England

North America

- Saint Michael's College, a private liberal arts college located in Colchester, Vermont, USA
- St. Michael's College School, a private Roman Catholic school for boys in Toronto, Ontario, Canada
- Santa Fe University of Art and Design, New Mexico, known as St. Michael's College until 1966
- University of St. Michael's College, a Catholic federated university in the University of Toronto

Elsewhere

- St Michael's College, Adelaide, Australia, a private Catholic primary and secondary school

== See also ==
- St. Michael's School (disambiguation)
- St. Michael Academy (disambiguation)
- Saint Michael (disambiguation)
