= Tegucigalpa Cathedral =

Coordinates: 14.1055°N 87.2045°W

St. Michael the Archangel Cathedral
- Catedral de San Míguel Arcángel
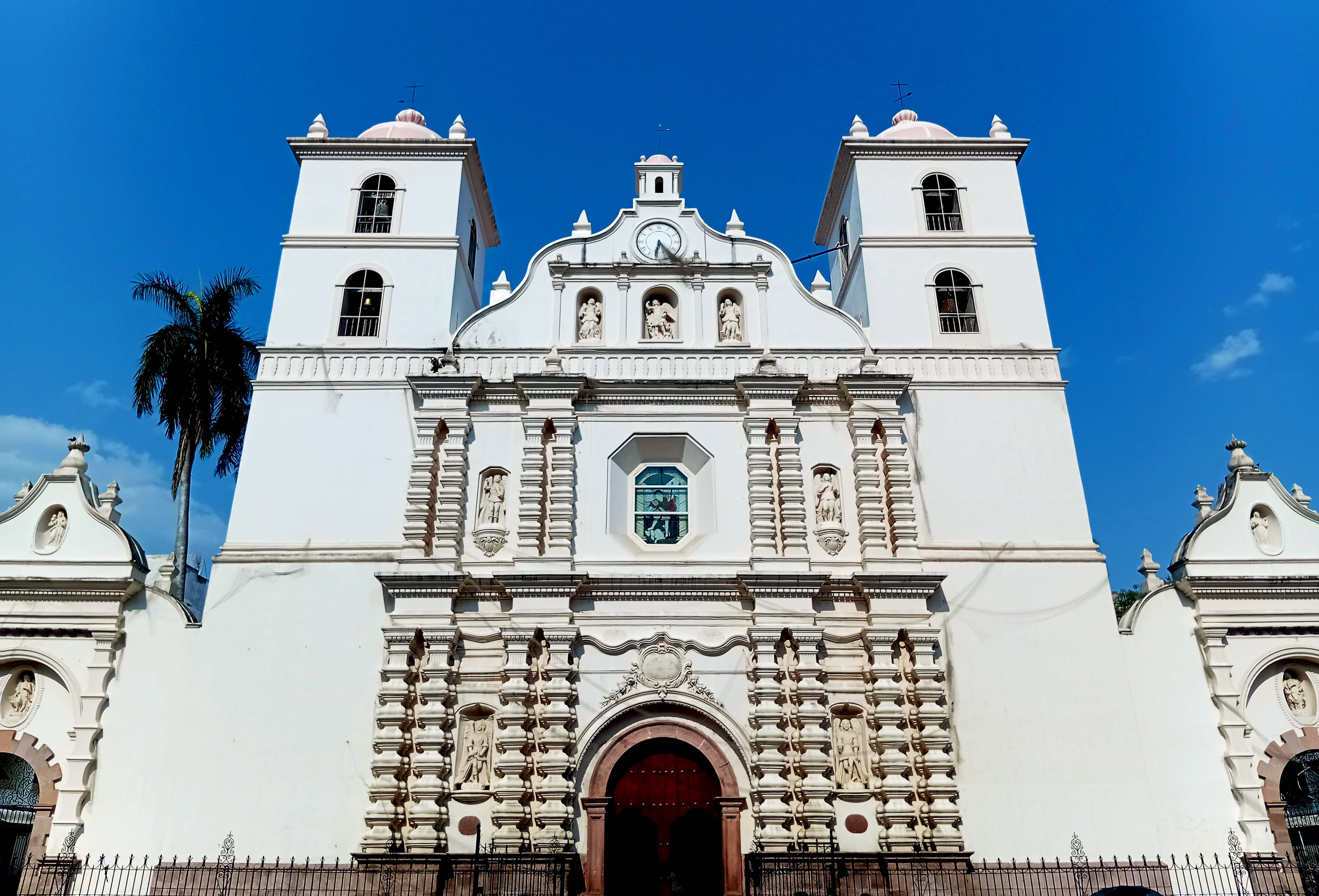
- St. Michael the Archangel Cathedral
- Location: Tegucigalpa
- Country: Honduras
- Denomination: Roman Catholic Church

Architecture
- Architectural type: Baroque
- Years built: 1763-1786

Administration
- Province: Francisco Morazan

The St. Michael the Archangel Cathedral (Spanish: Catedral Metropolitana de San Míguel Arcángel) is a Catholic temple in Tegucigalpa, Honduras. It is well known for being the biggest Catholic church during colonial times and one of the most well preserved historical buildings in Honduras.

== History ==
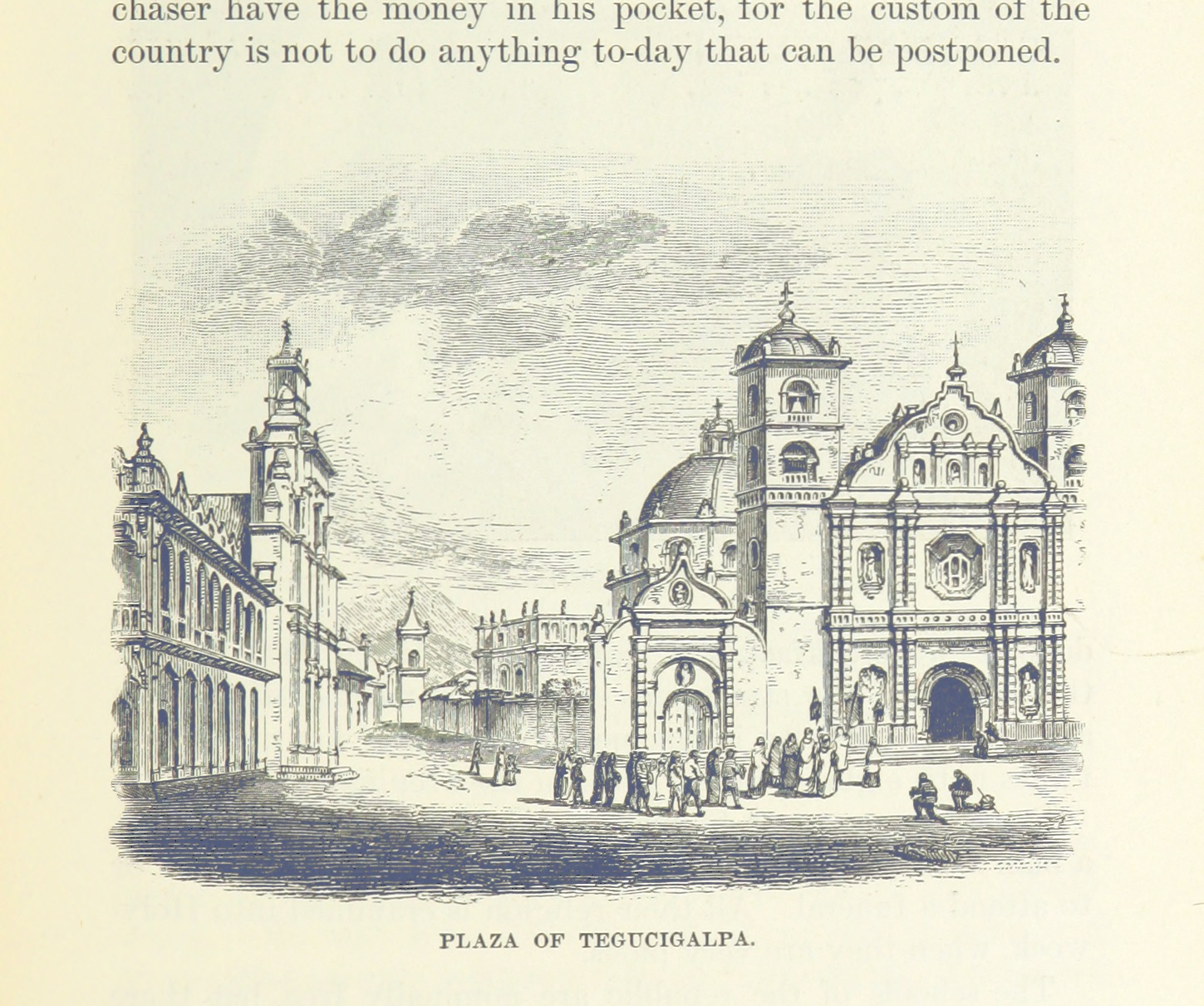
On the left side of the lithograph you can see part of the disappeared La Limpia de la Inmaculada Concepción colonial church, the structure still existed when the cathedral had already been finished, this is the only visual record of its existence. 19th century litograph by William Eleroy Curtis.

Colonial era

By the 18th century, Tegucigalpa had already reached a certain level of urban development compared to previous centuries thanks to the Bourbon reforms, which viewed Honduran towns more as residential areas than as transit, extraction, or livestock centers, therefore, the city was already beginning to have a larger population and a more active urban life.

In 1746, a fire consumed the temple dedicated to the town of Tegucigalpa named as Iglesia de La Limpia de la Inmaculada Concepción who was the church of the central park of Tegucigalpa. It is when the Bishop of Honduras Diego Rodriguez de Rivas y Velasco, at that time apostolic hierarch in the city of Comayagua, in 1756 ordered the construction of a new temple on the same site, charging that objective the priest Jose Simeon Zelaya Cepeda.

The parish of St. Michael the Archangel was founded in 1763, while the cathedral began to be built between 1765-1786 by Father Jose Simeon Zelaya Cepeda, who had studied in the Tridentine College of Comayagua, the architect was Joseph Gregory Billzarian Quiroz, of Guatemalan origin; the work was consecrated and inaugurated by Fray Antonio de San Miguel in 1782.

Republican era

In 1858 after the mayor's office of Tegucigalpa decided to demolish the ruins of the old church that was now in the left side of the cathedral. The only evidence of its existence are archives belonging to the Tegucigalpa diocese and a lithograph from 1857 showing the Tegucigalpa plaza and said church on the left side, after its demolition the wasteland was used to build new buildings. The cathedral remained the largest building in the city until the end of the 19th century and one of the largest cathedrals in Central America.

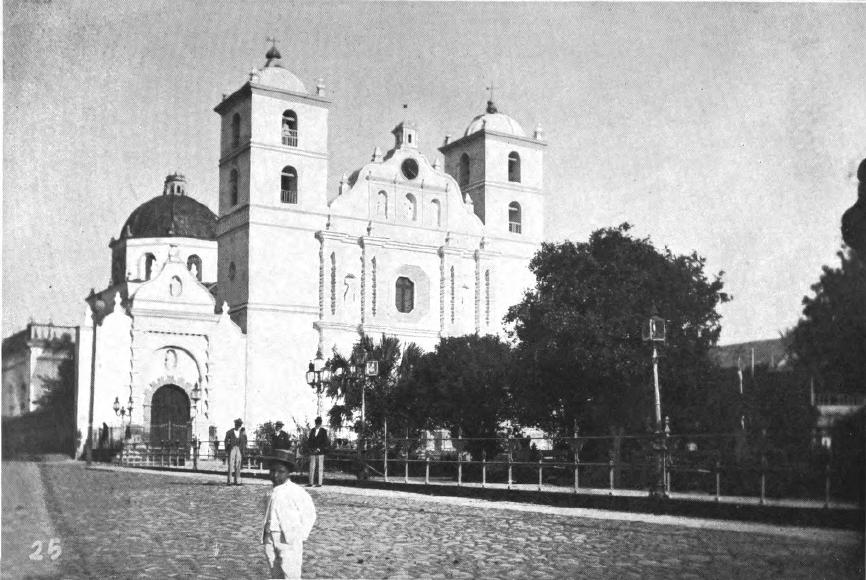
View of the Cathedral of Tegucigalpa in 1904.

The cathedral would survive the Honduran civil wars of 1919 and 1924, where various buildings in Tegucigalpa would be damaged by bullets, however the temple managed to survive this tragedy. Between 1934 and 1938, a long process of restoration of the building began, seeking to preserve the artistic works inside. Being in 1934, the Honduran painter Teresa Victoria Fortín Franco the person who worked together with the teacher Alejandro del Vecchio in the decoration and restoration of some works of the cathedral church of Tegucigalpa.

Over the decades, archaeological excavations began inside the temple to understand the techniques of its construction during the 18th century. In recent years, its original salmon color was restored, and the latest restoration work was a remodeling of its interior as well as its side patios.

== Architecture ==
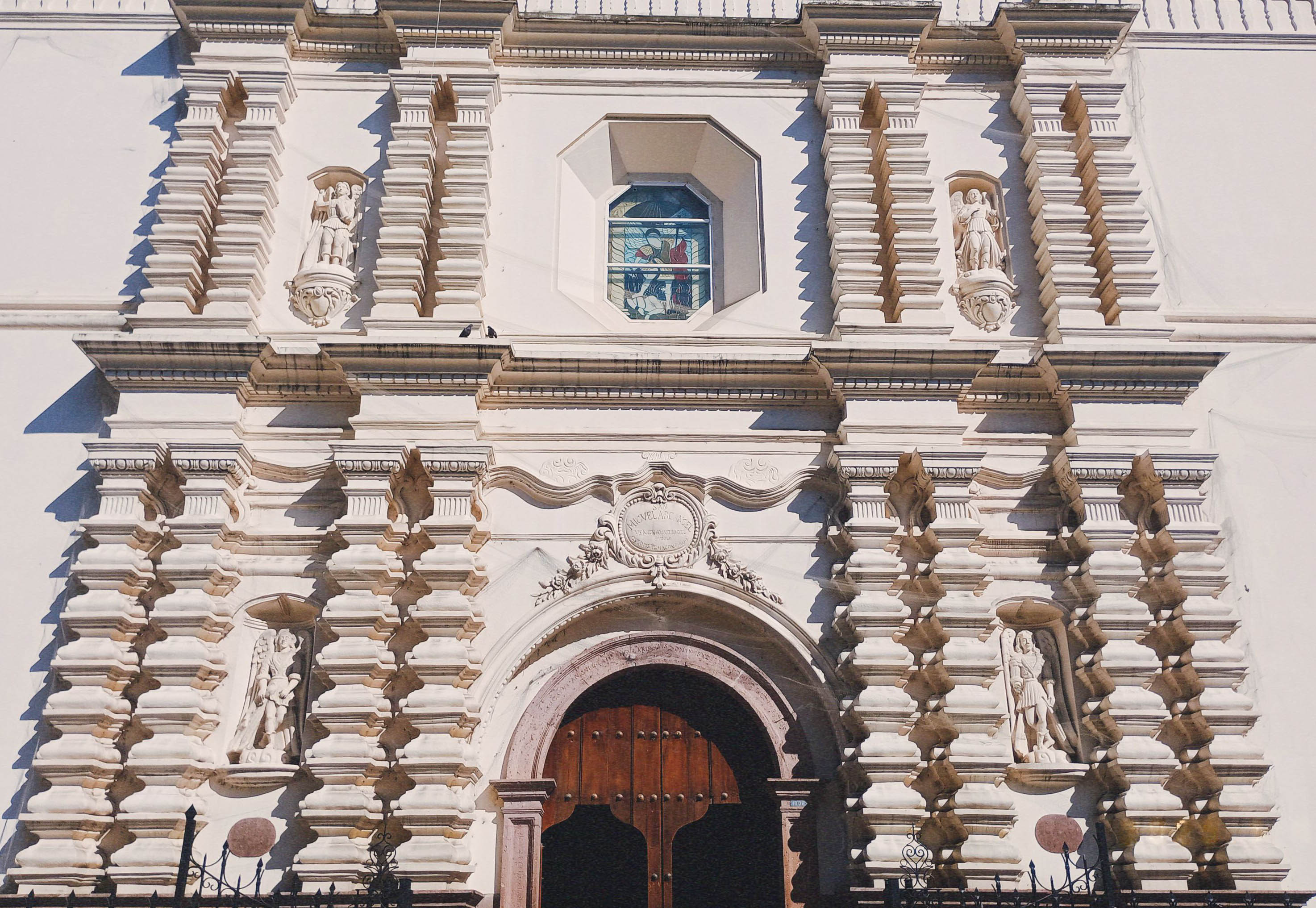
Cushioned columns of the main facade.

The building is about 60 meters long, 11 wide and 18 high, it has a single vaulted body and its dome reaches 30 meters high. The style of the architecture is Baroque. In 1788 the religious painter José Miguel Gómez also graduated from the Tridentino College of Saint Agustin of Comayagua finished the painting work in the Cathedral, his works being the following: "Holy Family", "Holy Trinity", "Saint John of Colazan" and "the Holy Supper". The "Four Evangelists" were painted adorning the vault.

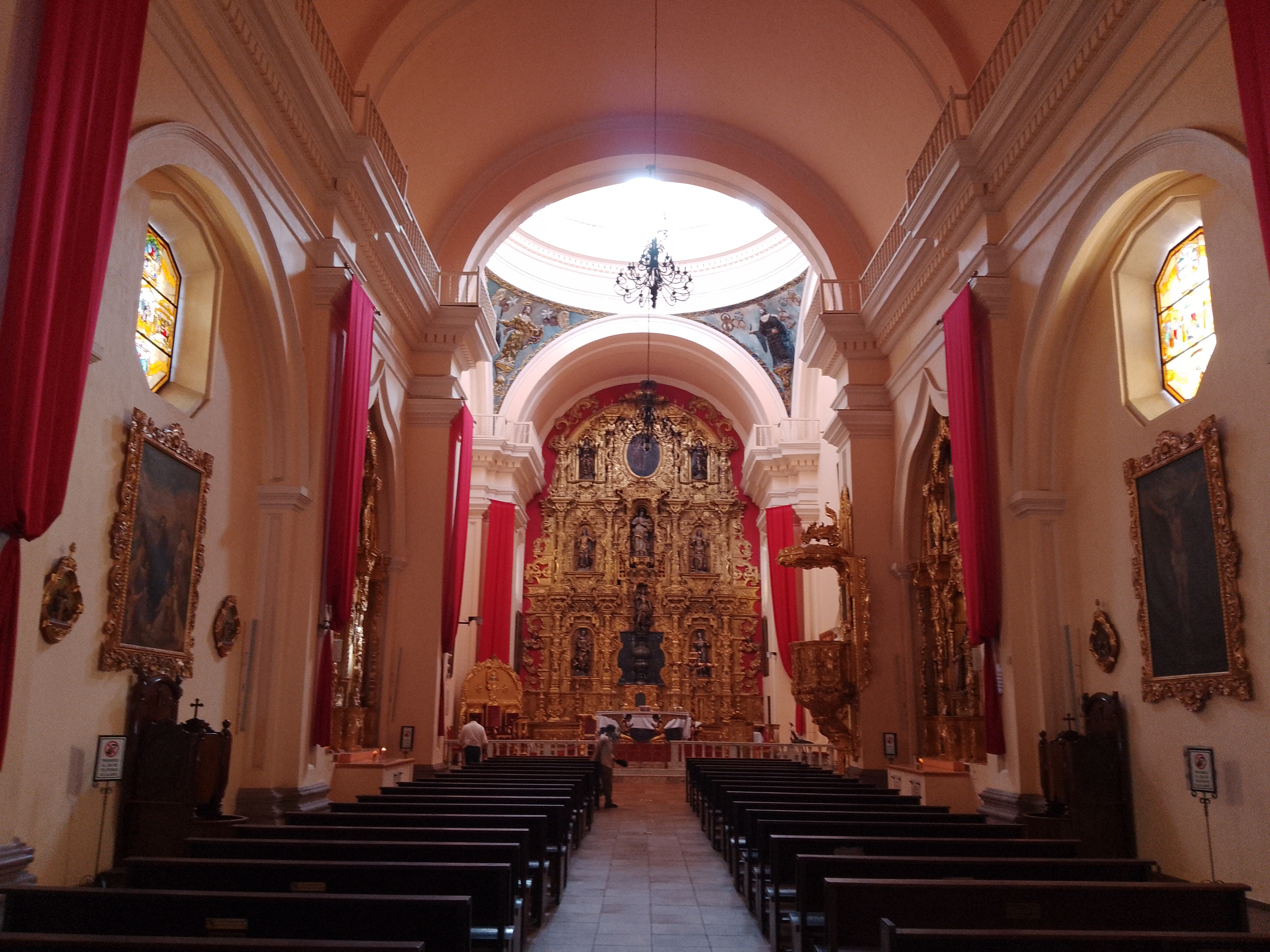
The golden altarpiece from the 18th century inside the cathedral.

These works were carried out by agreement with Bishop Fray Diego Rodrigo de Rivas, in the "rockery" style is the Main Altarpiece and the silver front of the main altar without forgetting the beautiful sculpture of San Miguel, in the back of the cathedral there is a courtyard with an altar in honor of the Virgin of Lourdes.

An earthquake in 1823 caused severe damage in the cathedral, which is why it was closed for repair for six years. In 1934, the Honduran painter Teresa Victoria Fortín Franco, worked together with the teacher Alejandro del Vecchio in the decoration and restoration of some works of the Cathedral Church of Tegucigalpa.

The Cathedral of San Miguel de Tegucigalpa is one of the oldest and most important buildings in the city that is preserved to this day in good general condition. The building has a place in Honduran history that is not limited to the sphere of influence of the city of Tegucigalpa but to the entire country, being the most renowned and traditional church since the beginning of the 20th century.

Being an old building, a proposal was made to restore the interior, the atrium, the side courtyards and the façade: the project has been carried out by the Department of Anthropological Research through the Archeology Section of the Honduran Institute of Anthropology and History.

== Historical figures buried in the cathedral ==
Some figures of historical relevance that are buried in the cathedral are:

- Presbyter José Simón Zelaya Cepeda, builder of the cathedral.
- Priest José Trinidad Reyes, founder of the Honduran National University.
- General José Santos Guardiola, President of the State of Honduras.
- General Manuel Bonilla, President of the Republic of Honduras.
- Bishop José María Martínez y Cabañas, first hierarch of the Archdiocese of Tegucigalpa

== National Monument ==
The cathedral was declared a National Monument according to Legislative Decree No. 8 issued in July 1967, according to the petition made before the Chamber of Deputies by the then Archbishop of Honduras, Monsignor Héctor Enrique Santos Hernánde

== Gallery ==
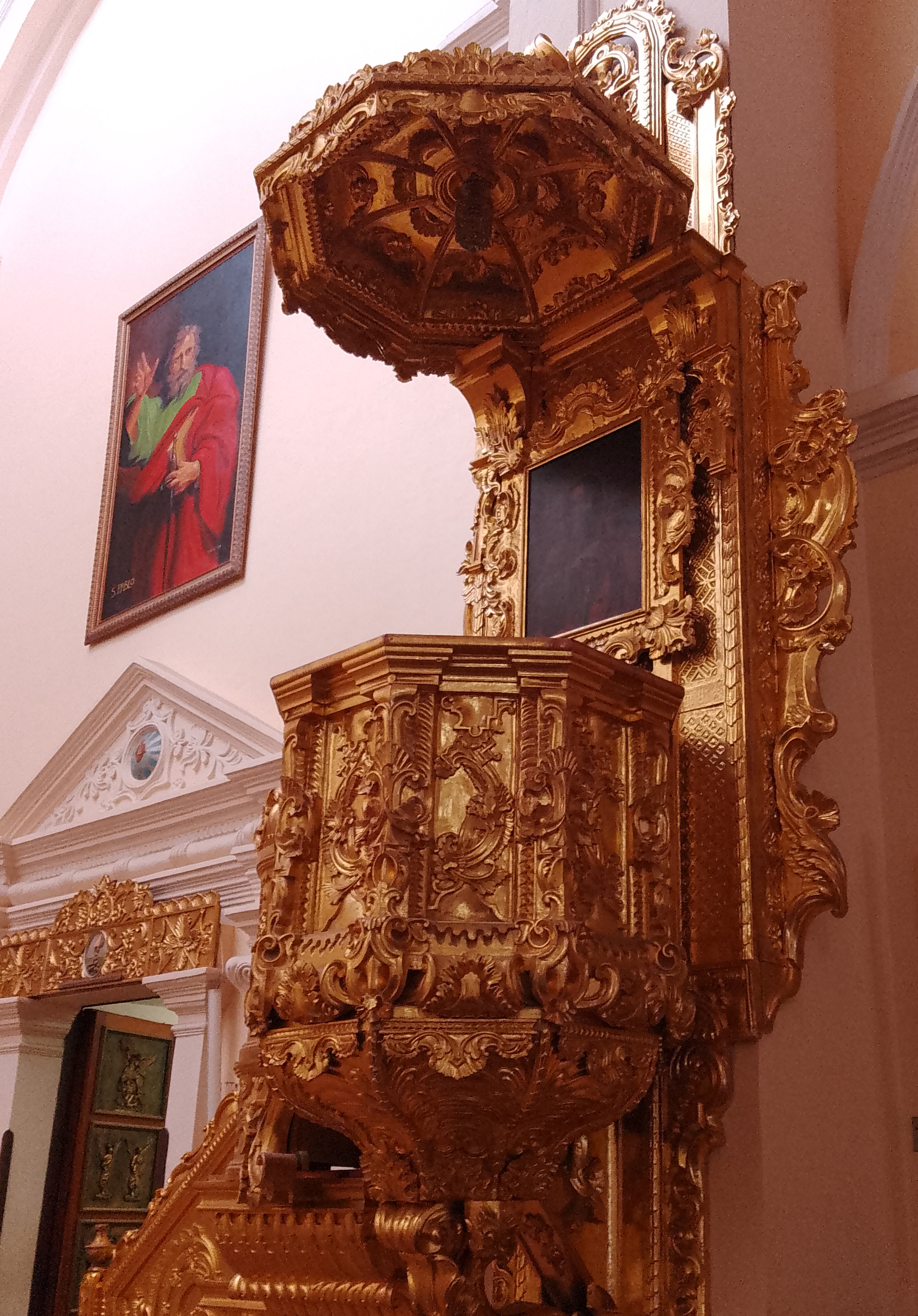
Pulpit

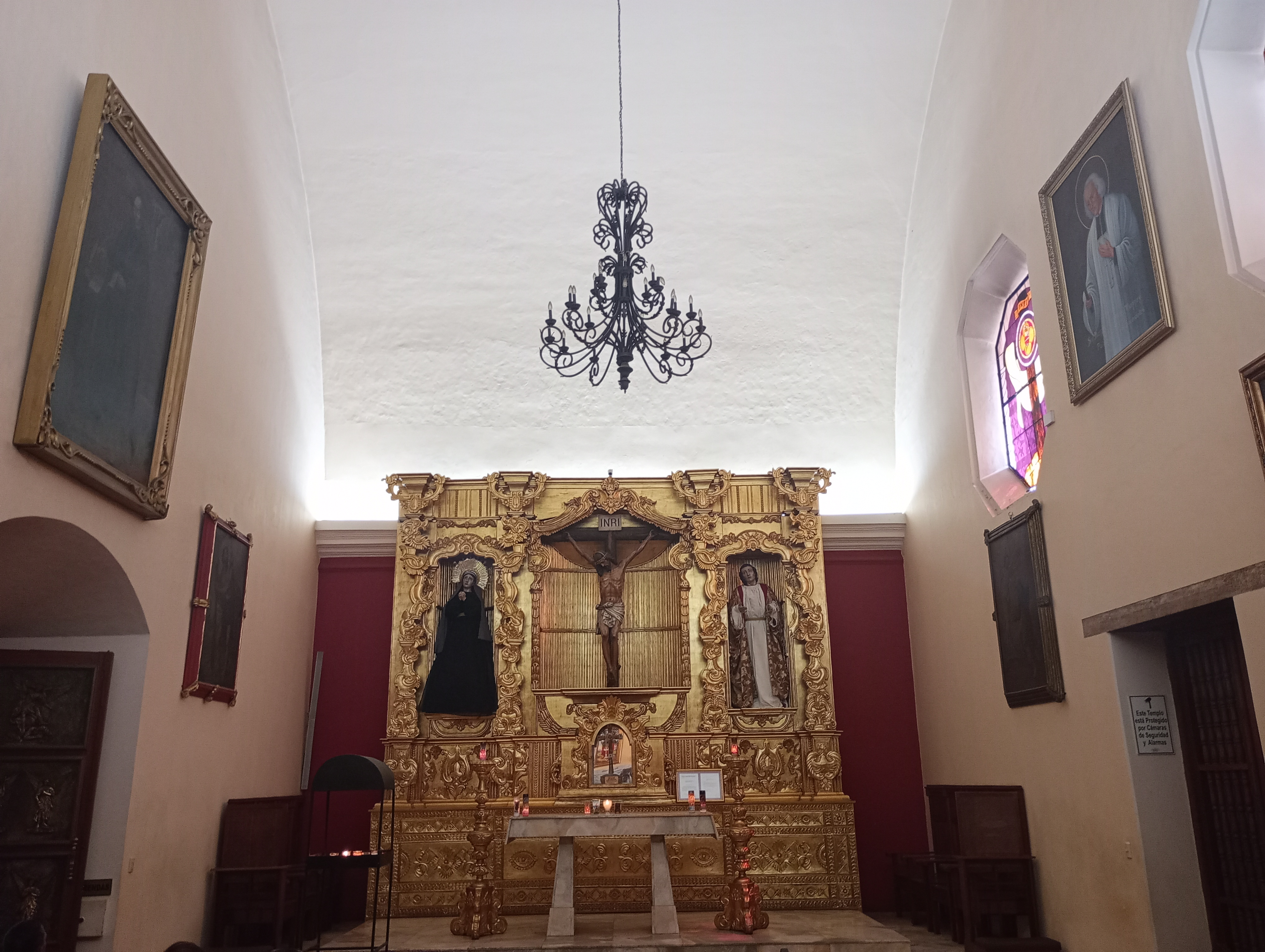
Chapel

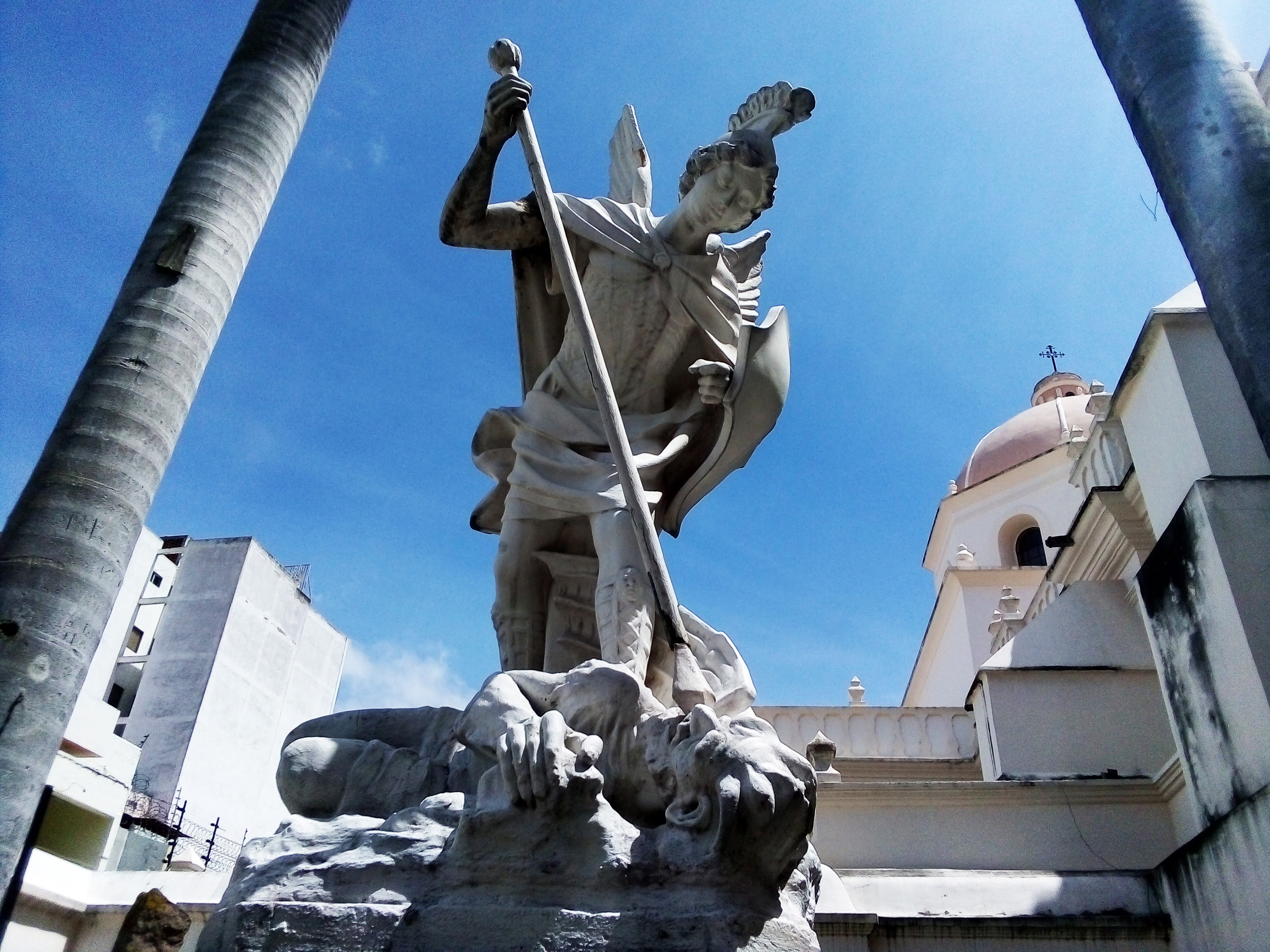
St. Michael Archangel statue

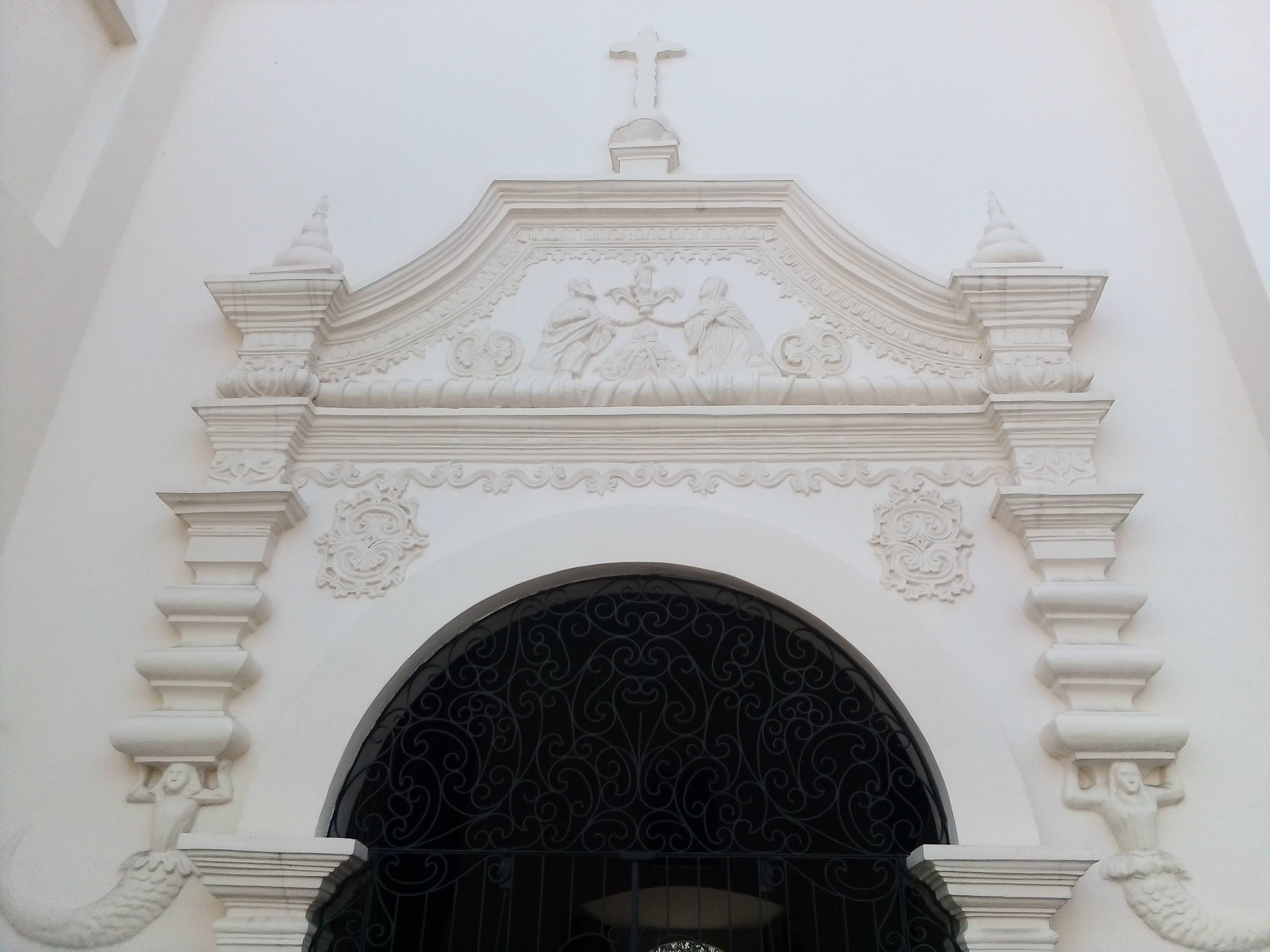
Left entrance

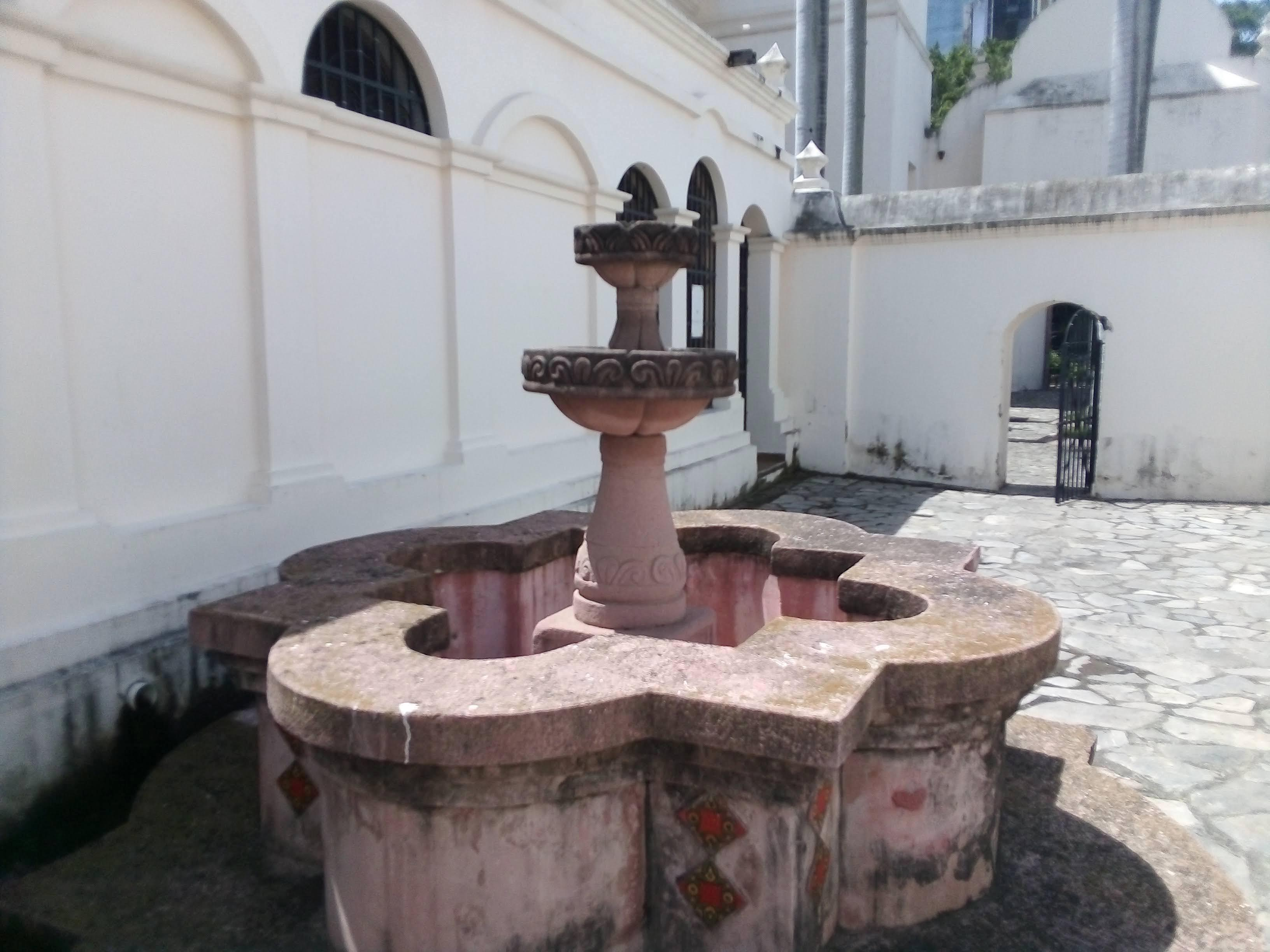
Colonial fountain

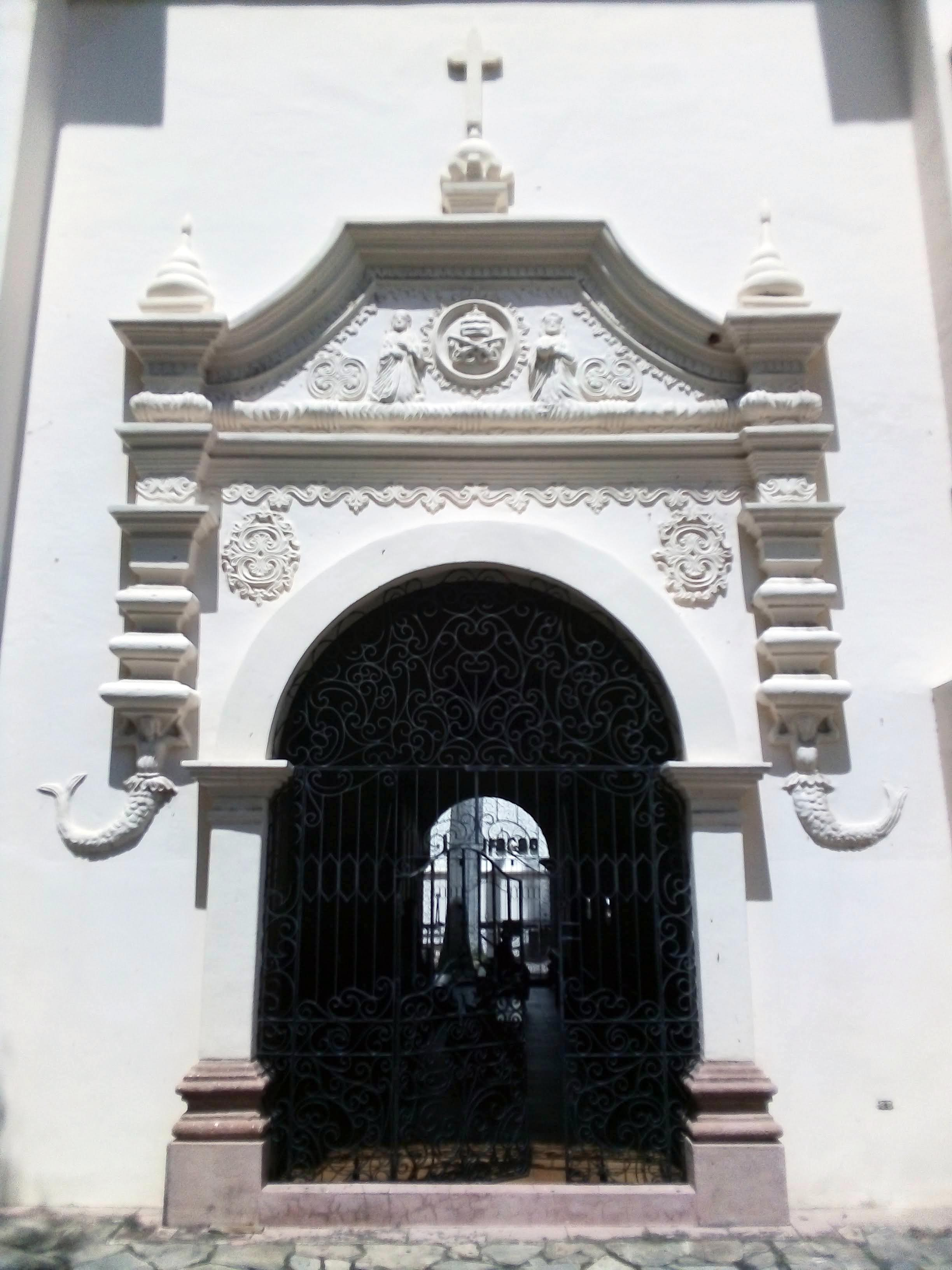
Right entrance

== See also ==
- Roman Catholicism in Honduras
- St. Michael's Church
- Immaculate Conception Cathedral, Comayagua
