= Verbiatyn =

Rural locality in Ternopil Oblast, Ukraine

Verbiatyn Верб'ятин
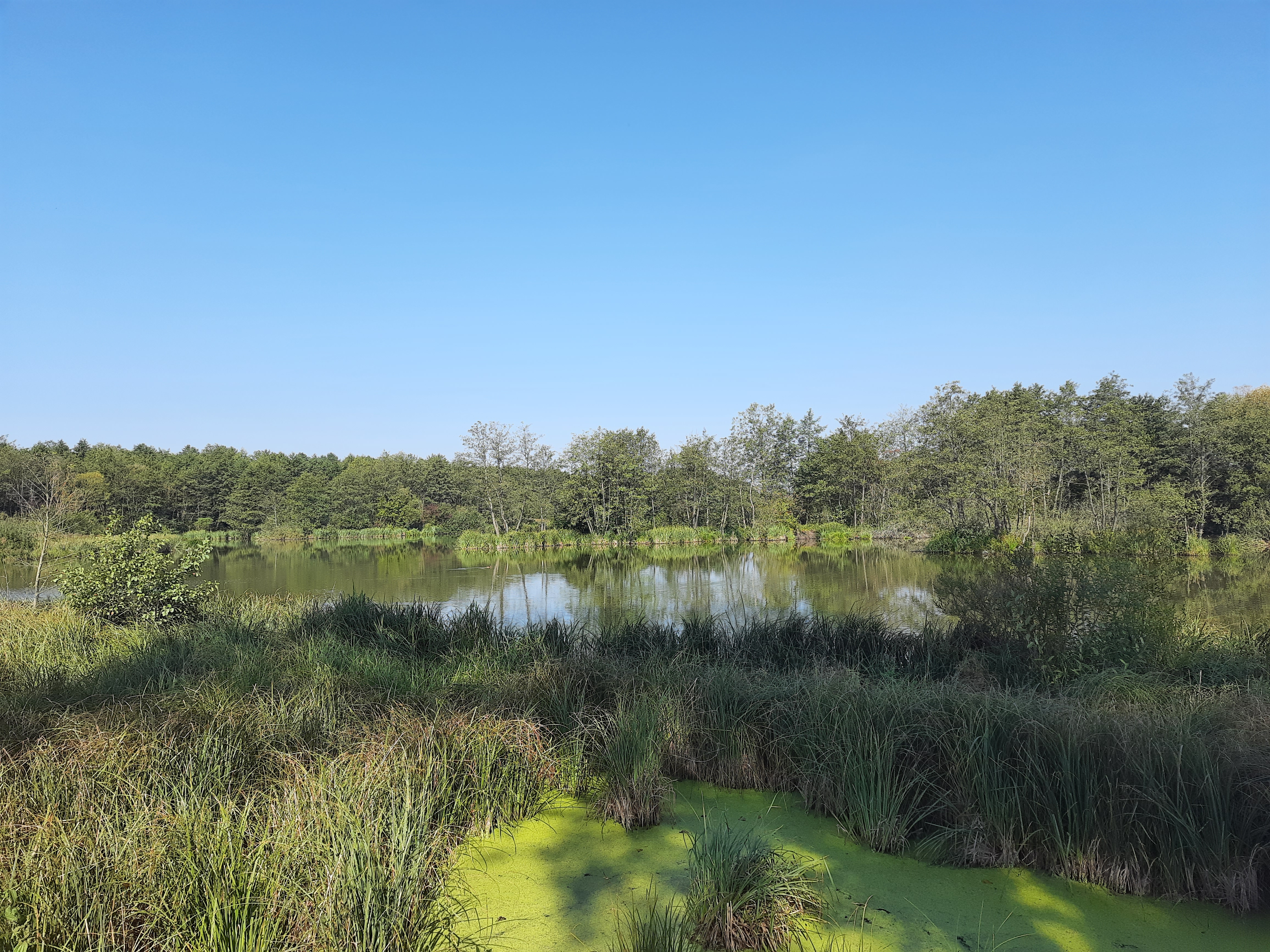
- Hydrological natural monument of local significance "Shpakove vikno"

- Location in Ternopil Oblast
- Coordinates: 49°4′8″N 25°16′21″E
- Country: Ukraine
- Oblast: Ternopil Oblast
- Raion: Chortkiv Raion
- Hromada: Buchach Hromada
- Time zone: UTC+2 (EET)
  - Summer (DST): UTC+3 (EEST)
- Postal code: 48422

Verbiatyn (Ukrainian: Верб'ятин) is a village in Buchach urban hromada, Chortkiv Raion, Ternopil Oblast, Ukraine.

== History ==
The village has been settled since at least 1692.

== Religion ==
- Saint Michael church (1889, wooden)

== Monuments ==
"Shpakove vikno" is a hydrological natural monument of local importance. There are 6 karst springs near the village.
