= St. Michael's Episcopal Church =

St. Michael's Episcopal Church, or variants thereof, may refer to:

== United States ==
- St. Michael's Episcopal Church (Anaheim, California)
- St. Michael's Church (Manhattan), New York City, listed on the National Register of Historic Places
- St. Michael's Episcopal Church, Trenton, New Jersey, now St. Michael's Church, listed on the National Register of Historic Places
- St. Michael and All Angels Episcopal Church (Cincinnati, Ohio)
- St. Michael's Episcopal Church (Birdsboro, Pennsylvania)
- St. Michael's Episcopal Church (Charleston, South Carolina), a National Historic Landmark
  - St. Michael's Churchyard, Charleston, South Carolina

== Scotland ==
- St Michael's Episcopal Church (Edinburgh), in Edinburgh

== See also ==
- Michaelion
- St. Michael's Church (disambiguation)
