= St. Michael's School =

St. Michael's School or St. Michael School may refer to:

== Australia ==
- St Michael's Collegiate School, Hobart, Tasmania
- St Michael's Grammar School, Melbourne
- St Michael's Parish School, Ashburton, Victoria

== Barbados ==
- The St. Michael School, Saint Michael, Barbados

== Canada ==
- Saint Michael Catholic High School (Niagara Falls, Ontario)
- St. Michael Catholic Secondary School, Stratford, Ontario
- St. Michael's Choir School, Toronto, Ontario
- St. Michael's College School, Toronto, Ontario
- Saint Michael's School (Simcoe-Walsh), Ontario
- St. Michaels University School, Victoria, British Columbia

== India ==
- St. Michael's High School, Patna

== Ireland (Republic of) ==
- St Michael's Loreto Secondary School (Navan)

== Malaysia ==
- St. Michael's Institution, Ipoh, Perak
- St. Michael's Secondary School, Sandakan, Sabah

== Malta ==
- St. Michael School (Malta), Santa Venera, Malta

== New Zealand ==
- St Michael's Church School, Christchurch

== South Africa ==
- St. Michael's School, Bloemfontein, Free State

== United Kingdom ==
- St Michael and All Angels Catholic Primary School, Barnsley, South Yorkshire
- St Michael's Catholic Grammar School, Finchley, London
- St Michael's Catholic High School, Watford, Hertfordshire
- St Michael's Catholic School, High Wycombe, Buckinghamshire
- St Michael's Church of England Combined School, Stewkley, Buckinghamshire
- St Michael's Church of England High School, Chorley, Lancashire
- St Michael's Church of England High School, Crosby, Merseyside
- St Michael's Church of England High School, Rowley Regis, West Midlands
- St Michael's Church of England Middle School, Colehill, Dorset
- St Michael's College, Enniskillen, Enniskillen, County Fermanagh, Northern Ireland
- St Michael's Grammar School, Lurgan, County Armagh, Northern Ireland
- St Michael's Prep School, Otford, Kent
- St Michael's Preparatory School, Jersey, Channel Islands
- St Michael's Primary School, Winterbourne, Gloucestershire
- St Michael's School, Llanelli, Carmarthenshire, Wales

== United States ==
- St. Michael the Archangel Catholic High School, Lee's Summit, Missouri
- St. Michael the Archangel Catholic School - Cary, North Carolina
- St. Michael the Archangel High School (East Baton Rouge Parish, Louisiana), Shenandoah, Louisiana
- Saint Michael the Archangel High School (Fredericksburg, Virginia)
- St. Michael Elementary School, Louisville, Kentucky
- St. Michael High School, St. Michaels, Arizona
- St. Michael School (Frostburg, Maryland) (closed, 2009 or 2012)
- St. Michael-Albertville High School, Minnesota
- St. Michael's High School, Santa Fe, New Mexico
- St. Michael's High School (Union City, New Jersey), a defunct school
- St. Michael's Preparatory School (Silverado, California)
- Saint Michael's School (Cranford, New Jersey)

== See also ==
- St. Michael Academy (disambiguation)
- St. Michael's College (disambiguation)
- Saint Michael (disambiguation)
