= İstinye =

Neighborhood in Istanbul, Turkey

- Neighbourhood
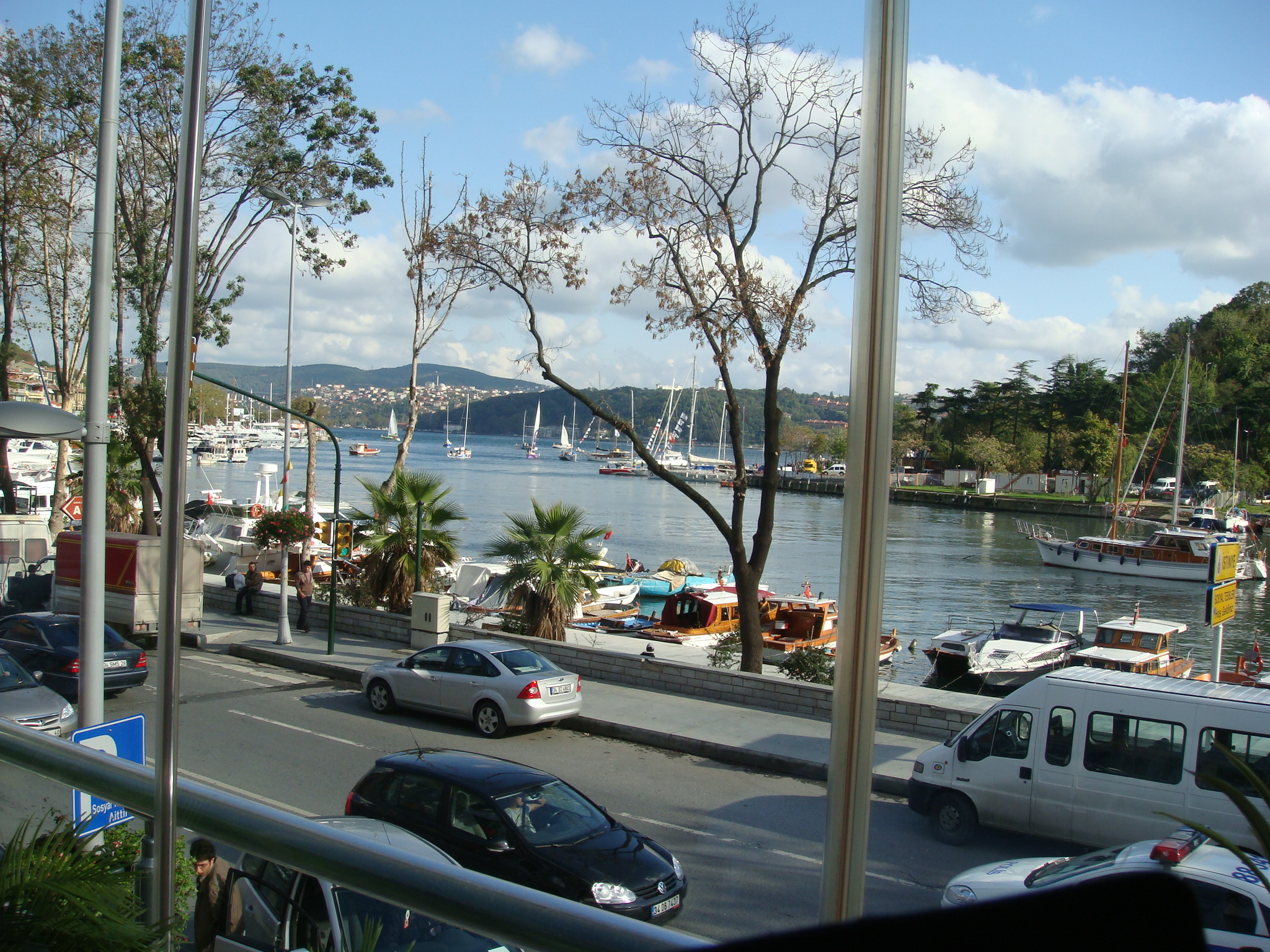
- İstinye bay

- Location within Turkey Location within Istanbul
- Coordinates: 41°06′55″N 29°03′15″E
- Country: Turkey
- Province: Istanbul
- District: Sarıyer
- Population (2022): 15,721
- Time zone: UTC+3 (TRT)

İstinye is a neighbourhood in the municipality and district of Sarıyer, Istanbul, Turkey. Its population was 15,721 in 2022. It is on the European side of the city between the neighbourhoods of Emirgan and Yeniköy, on the northwestern shore of the Bosporus strait.

In classical antiquity it was the site of a town called Lasthenes, which was later renamed Leosthenion (Greek: Λεωσθένιον), and corrupted to Sosthenion (Greek: Σωσθένιον) during the Middle Ages. The village was the site of the Michaelion, a church and monastery dedicated to St. Michael in Byzantine times.

Since 1995 the headquarters of the Istanbul Stock Exchange has been in İstinye.

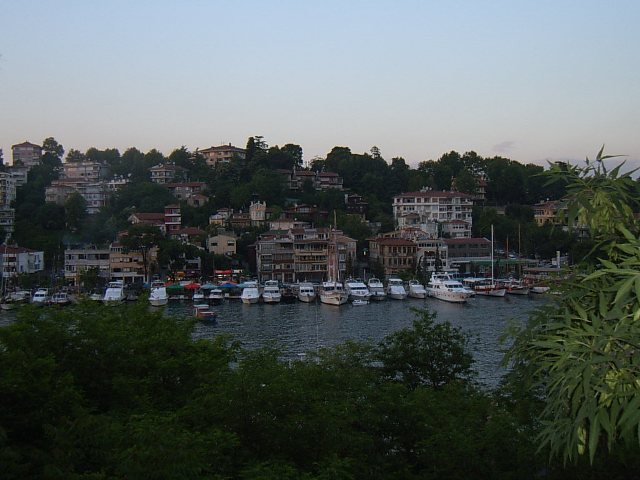
Istinye wharf

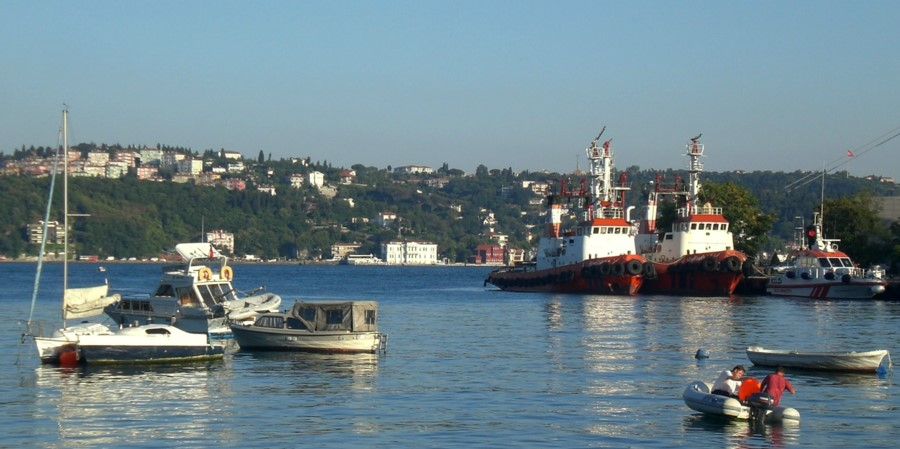
Istinye seaside

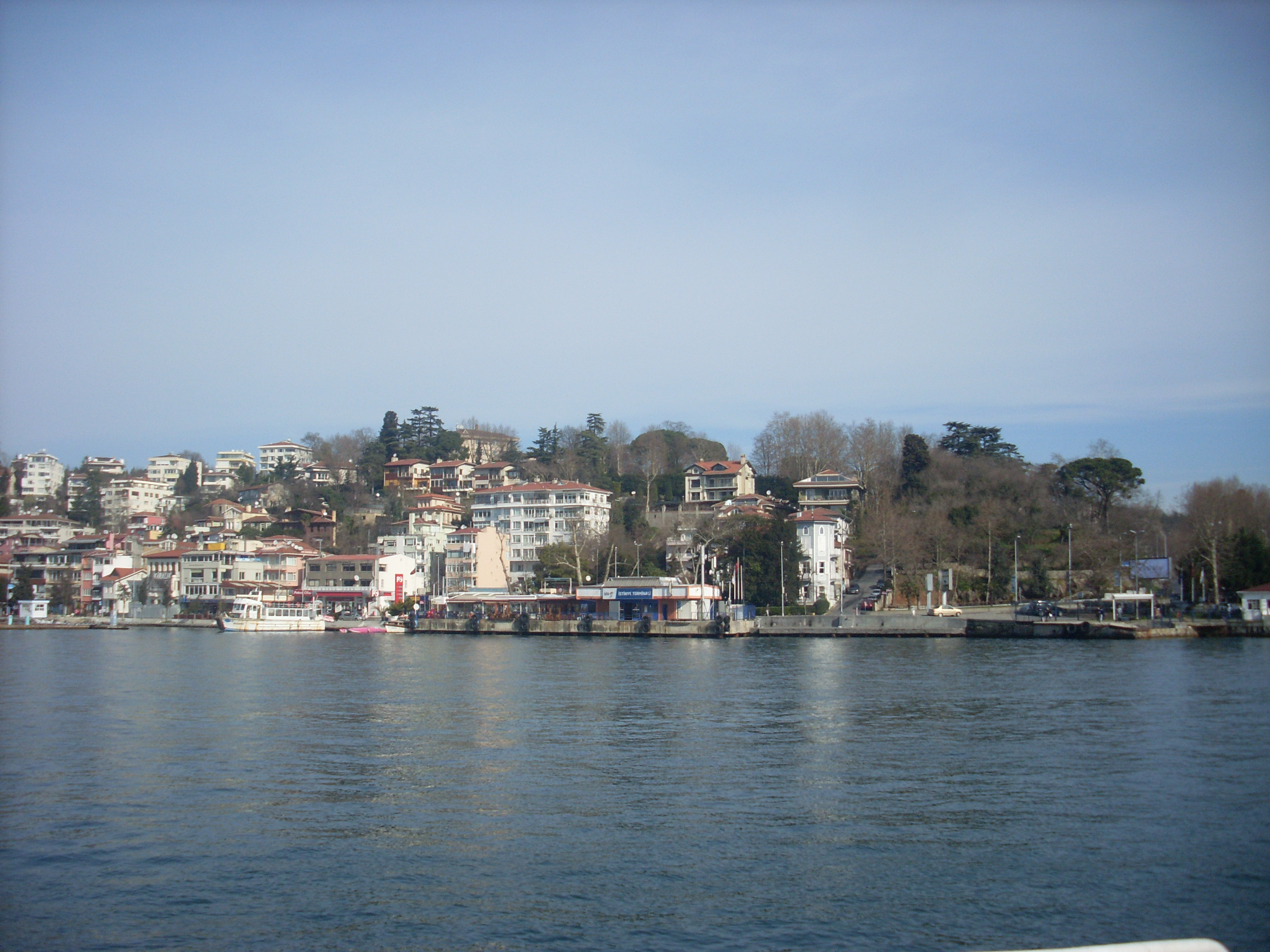
Istinye bay

== Places of interest ==
- Michaelion
- Istanbul Stock Exchange
