= St Mary and St Michael's Church =

St Mary and St Michael's Church may refer to:

- Church of St Mary and St Michael, Bonds, Lancashire, England
- St Mary's and St Michael's Church, Burleydam, Cheshire, England
- St Mary and St Michael's Church, Great Urswick, Cumbria, England
- Church of St Mary and St Michael, Llanarth, Monmouthshire, Wales
- Church of St Mary and St Michael, Stepney, London, England

== See also ==
- St Mary's Church (disambiguation)
- St Michael's Church (disambiguation)
