= St. Michael Academy =

St. Michael Academy or St. Michael's Academy is the name of many schools and other educational institutions. Most have a religious heritage and are named after Saint Michael:

- Saint Michael Academy (Catarman), Philippines
- St Michael's Academy, Kilwinning, North Ayrshire, Scotland
- St. Michael Academy (New York City), United States
- Saint Michael's Academy, Spokane, Washington, United States
- St. Michael's Catholic Academy (Travis County, Texas), United States
- St Michael's Catholic Academy, Billingham, County Durham, England
- St. Michael Catholic Academy, Thornhill, Ontario, Canada
- Mount Saint Michael Academy, New York City, United States
- St. Michael’s Academy, Speingfield, MA

== See also ==
- St. Michael's School (disambiguation)
- St. Michael's College (disambiguation)
- Saint Michael (disambiguation)
