= Michaelchurch =

Michaelchurch may refer to the following settlements in the United Kingdom, and St Michael's Church, Michaelchurch to their namesake church buildings:

- Michaelchurch, Tretire with Michaelchurch, village in Tretire with Michaelchurch civil parish in southwest Herefordshire, England
  - St Michael's Church, Tretire with Michaelchurch
- Michaelchurch Escley, civil parish in south Herefordshire, England
  - St Michael's Church, Michaelchurch Escley
- Michaelchurch-on-Arrow, Radnorshire, Powys, Wales
  - St Michael's Church, Michaelchurch-on-Arrow

== See also ==
- Michael Church, Grenadian politician
- St. Michael's Church (disambiguation)
