= Saint Michael and Saint George =

Saint Michael and Saint George may refer to:

- Order of St Michael and St George, a British order of chivalry
- Palace of St. Michael and St. George or Palaia Anaktora, a residence in Corfu, Greece
- St Michael and St George Cathedral, Grahamstown, an Anglican cathedral in South Africa
- Cathedral of St Michael and St George, Aldershot a Roman Catholic cathedral in England

== See also ==
- San Jorge, San Miguel, a municipality in El Salvador
- Cathedral of St Michael and St George (disambiguation)
- Saint Michael (disambiguation)
- Saint George (disambiguation)
