= Saint Michael Church, Verbiatyn =

Greek Catholic church in Verbiatyn, Ukraine

Saint Michael Church
- Церква чуда святого Архистратига Михаїла в Хонах
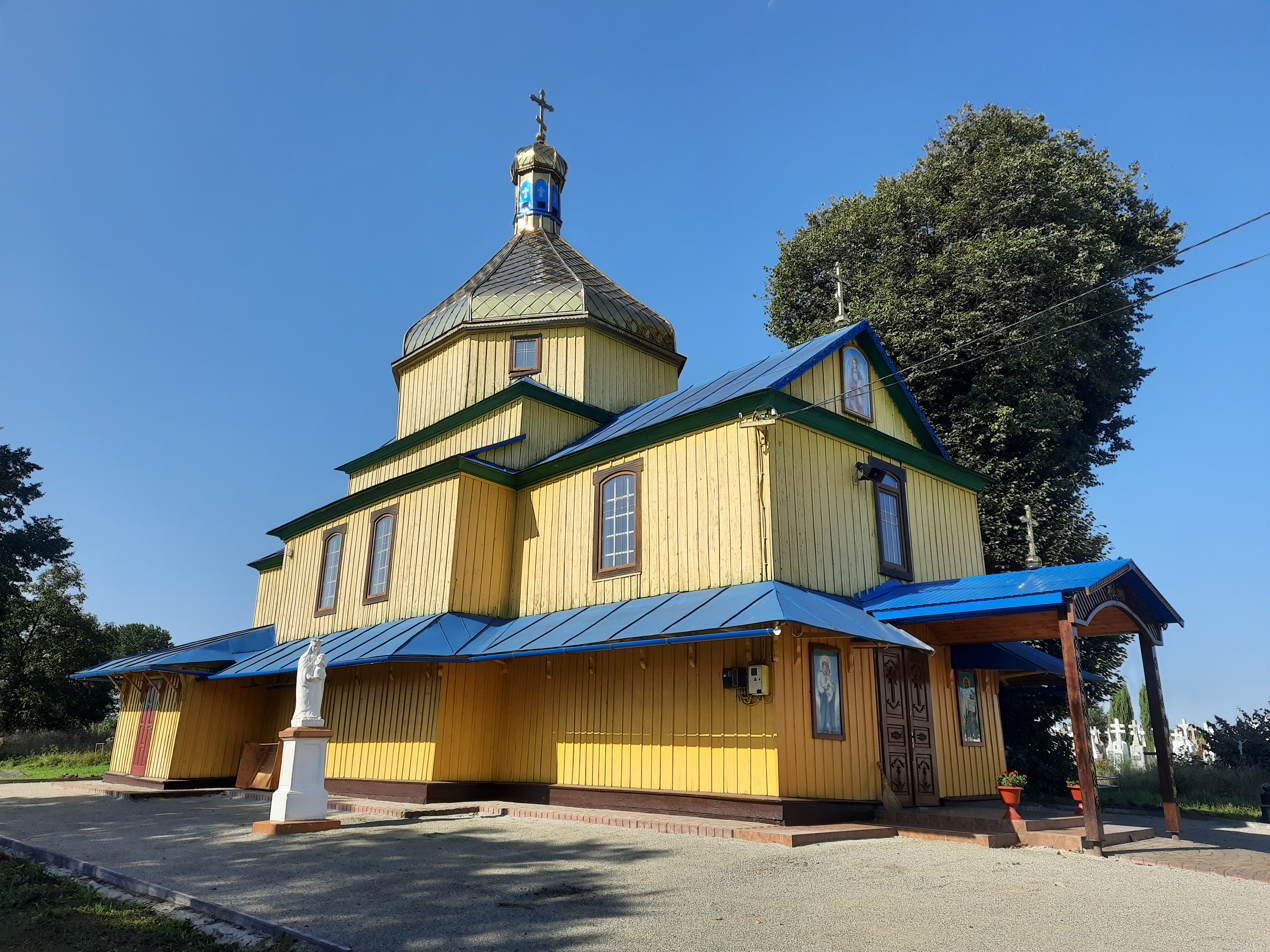

- Location within Ternopil Oblast

Religion
- Affiliation: Ukrainian Greek Catholic Church

Location
- Location: Verbiatyn, Buchach urban hromada, Chortkiv Raion, Ternopil Oblast, Ukraine
- Coordinates: 49°04′03″N 25°16′23″E

Architecture
- Completed: 1893

Saint Michael Church (Ukrainian: Церква чуда святого Архистратига Михаїла в Хонах) is a Greek Catholic parish church (UGCC) in Verbiatyn of the Buchach urban hromada, Chortkiv Raion, Ternopil Oblast, Ukraine.

== History ==
The wooden church was built in 1893.

Until 1990, the parish and the church was a subsidiary branch of a larger church, so priests from Ozeriany served there. In 1990, the community of Verbiatyn became independent and moved to the UAOC, and in 2018 it became part of the OCU.

On 22 September 2019, Archbishop Tykhon of Ternopil and Buchach visited the parish.

Number of believers: 1832 – 224, 1844 – 290, 1854 – 361, 1864 – 400, 1874 – 342, 1884 – 823, 1886 – 823, 1896 – 412, 1906 – 522, 1914 – 482, 1927 – 501, 1938 – 580.

== Priests ==
- at. unknown (1932)
- at. Mykhail Simenovych (1836–1837)
- at. Mykhailo Bokovskyi (1837–1842)
- at. Ferdynand Nedvetskyi (Medvetskyi) (1842–1845)
- at. Dmytro Vladychyn (1845–1864)
- at. Onufrii Vanchytskyi (1864–1866)
- at. Vasyl Tselevych (1866–1904)
- at. Petro Pavliuk (1904–1906)
- at. Veselovskyi (1907–1910)
- at. Mykhailo Andriishyn (1910–1933)
- at. Semen Pavliuk (1934–1938)
- at. I. Derkovych and at. Hnatyk, at. Stepan Korol (1944–1969)
- at. Petro Vysotskyi (1970–1989)
- at. Pavlo Dvulit – now

== Sources ==
- (in Ukrainian) Семанишин, В., Верб'ятин // Ternopil Encyclopedic Dictionary: in 4 v. / editorial board: H. Yavorskyi and other, Ternopil: "Zbruch", 2004, V. 1: А—Й, S. 246. — ISBN 966-528-197-6.
- (in Ukrainian) Семанишин В., Уніят, В., Верб'ятин // Ternopil Oblast. History of cities and villages: in 3 v. / Ternopil: "Terno-graph", 2014, V. 1: А—В, S. 600. — ISBN 978-966-457-228-3.
- "Wierzbiatyn, pow. buczacki". Geographical Dictionary of the Kingdom of Poland (in Polish). 13. Warszawa: Kasa im. Józefa Mianowskiego. 1893. p. 391.
