= St Michael's Church, Finström =

Coordinates: 60°15′49″N 19°55′51″E

St Michael's Church
- Finström Church
- S:t Mikaels kyrka
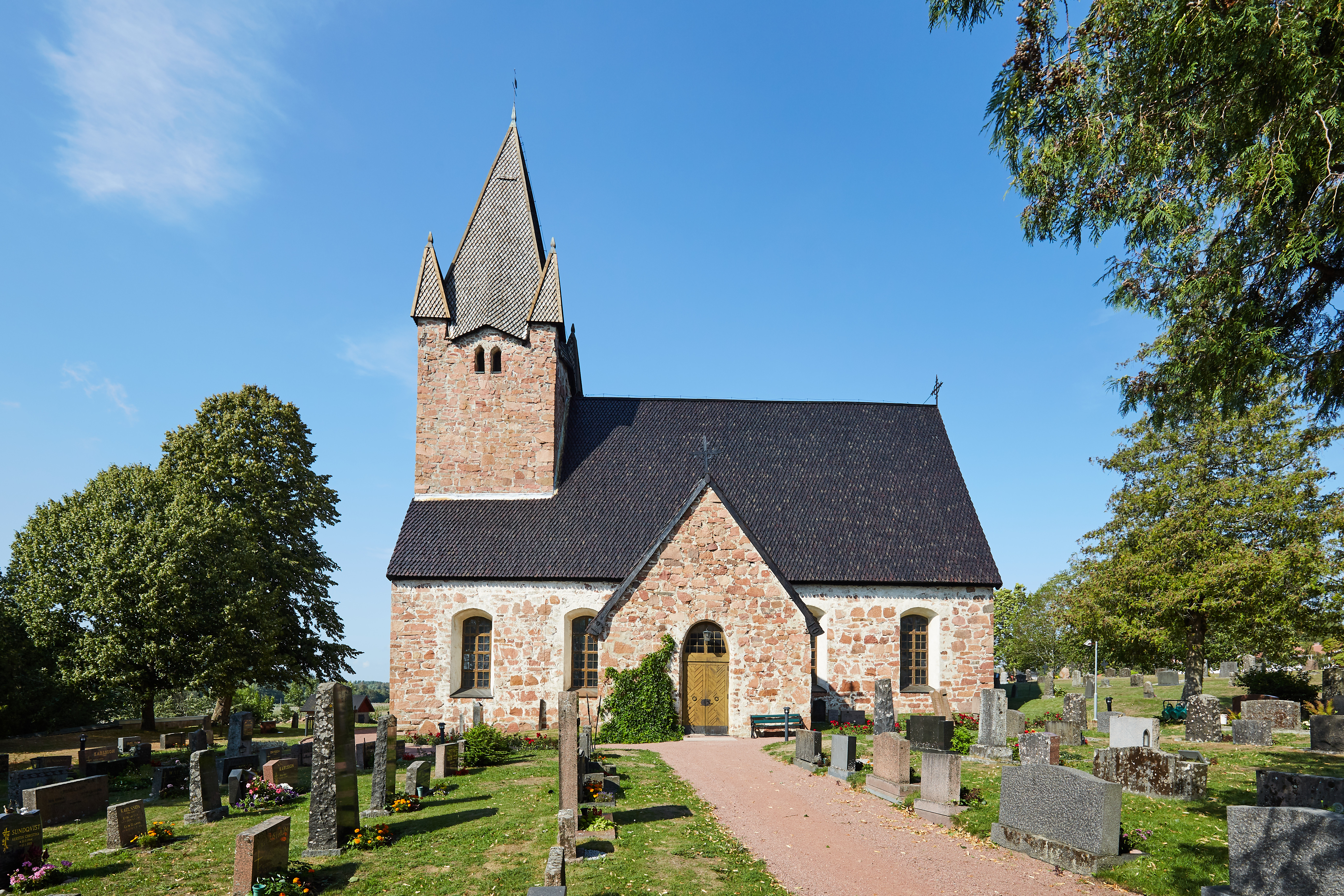
- St Michael's Church
- Location: Finström, Åland
- Address: Pålsbölevägen 258, 22310 Pålsböle, Åland
- Country: Finland
- Language: Swedish
- Denomination: Lutheranism
- Previous denomination: Roman Catholic
- Website: https://www.norraalandsforsamling.ax/

History
- Dedication: St Michael

Architecture
- Heritage designation: Protected by law
- Style: Gothic
- Years built: C. 1445–1460

Specifications
- Capacity: 435 seats

Administration
- Diocese: Diocese of Borgå
- Parish: Northern Åland Parish

St Michael's Church is a late medieval Lutheran stone church in Finström in Åland Islands. The church, dedicated to Saint Michael, represents a significant example of late medieval ecclesiastical architecture in the Åland archipelago. According to research conducted by Markus Hiekkanen, the construction of the nave can be precisely dated to the period between 1445 and 1460, with stylistic parallels evident in contemporary ecclesiastical structures throughout Southwest Finland and Uusimaa region.

Archaeological evidence suggests that a wooden predecessor likely occupied the site, with its 13th-century stone sacristy subsequently incorporated into the present structure. The construction of Finström Church proceeded in phases throughout the 15th century rather than as a single campaign. The interior vaulting, porch, and bell tower are attributed to the latter half of the century, with Hiekkanen specifically dating the tower construction to between 1465 and 1470.

== Architecture and interior ==
The church's interior demonstrates sophisticated masonry techniques, featuring vaulted construction in natural stone. The structural integrity is enhanced by transverse arches and projecting wall pillars, between which wide round-arched openings create spatial continuity. A restoration programme was undertaken between 1967 and 1970.

The church accommodates 435 congregants and houses an 18-stop organ constructed by Hans Heinrich in 1974. This instrument replaced the previous organ dating from 1768, which remains in working condition and is situated in the church porch. The altarpiece, a stained glass composition entitled Atonement of Sins, was created by Lennart Segerstråle in 1947. The 17th-century pulpit occupies a position to the right of the altar. The church also preserves several medieval sculptures alongside a 15th-century altarpiece.

The church tower is believed to have served as inspiration for the tower of Tampere Cathedral, designed by architect Lars Sonck, who spent his formative years in Åland, where his father served as vicar of Finström. According to Hiekkanen's research, the master builder responsible for the church's construction drew inspiration from the steeples of German coastal cities, as well as from the towers of Turku Cathedral and St Nicholas' Church in Tallinn, Estonia.

The churchyard contains a commemorative statue of Frans Peter von Knorring, who served as vicar of Finström from 1834 to 1875 and was the founding father of the Åland educational system.

== Images ==
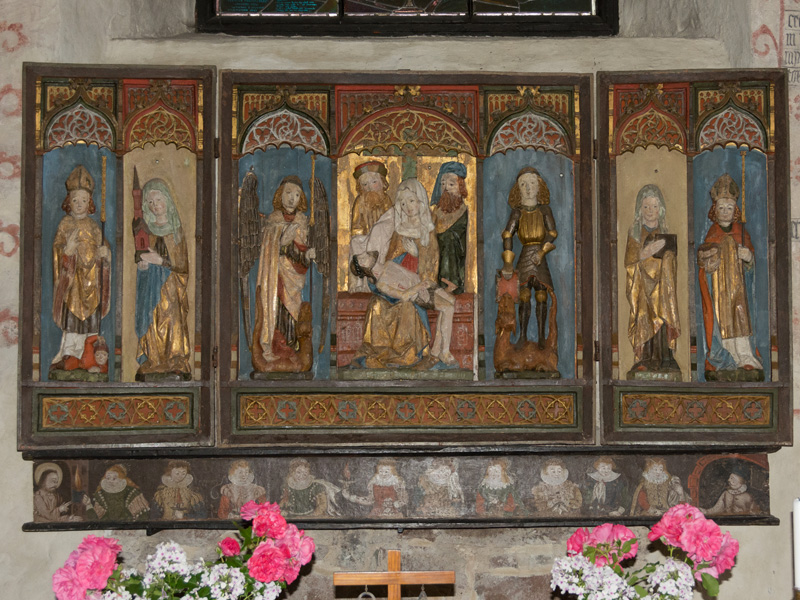
Altarpiece in St Michael's Church.

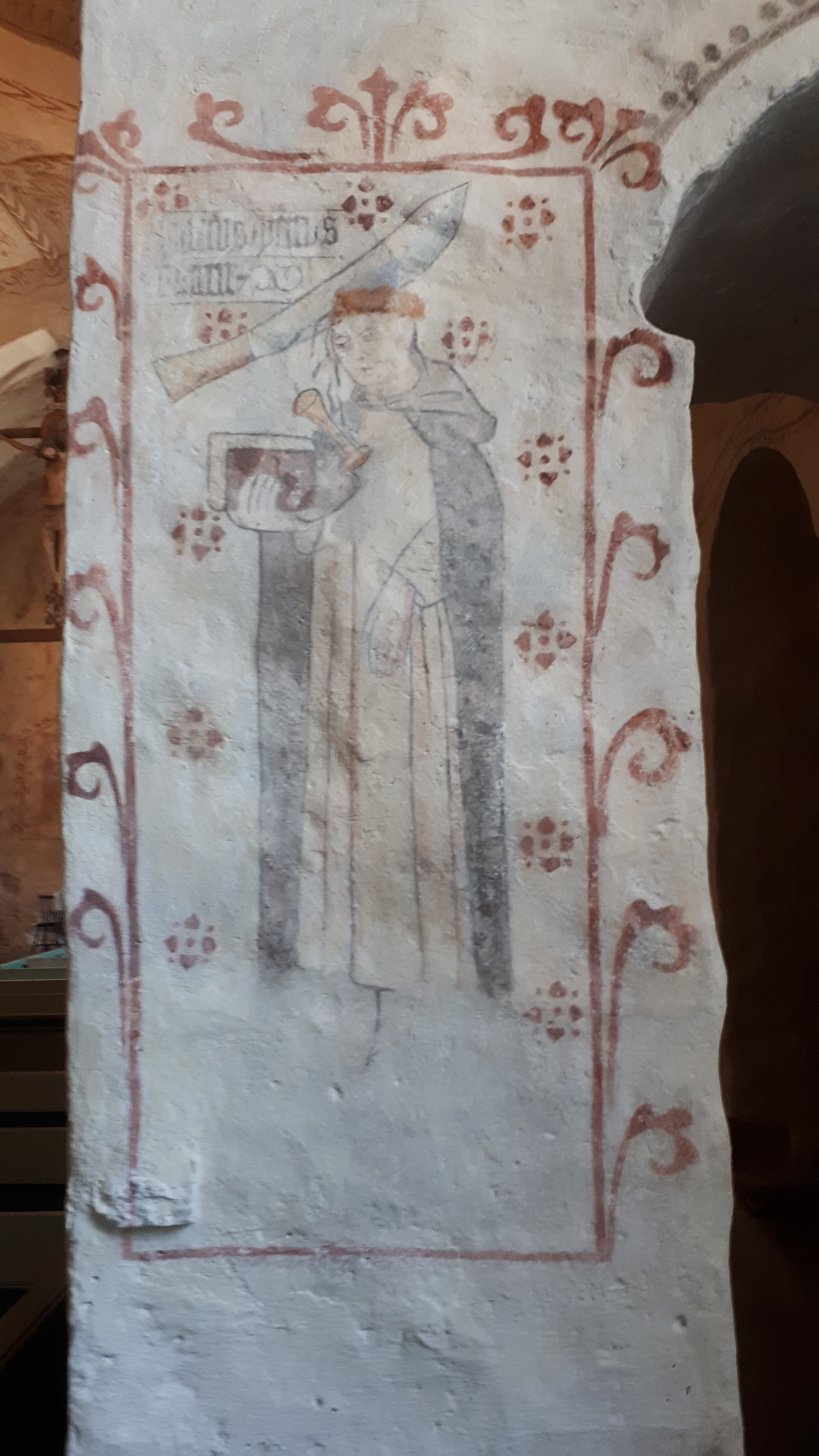
Late Gothic wall paintings in the church.

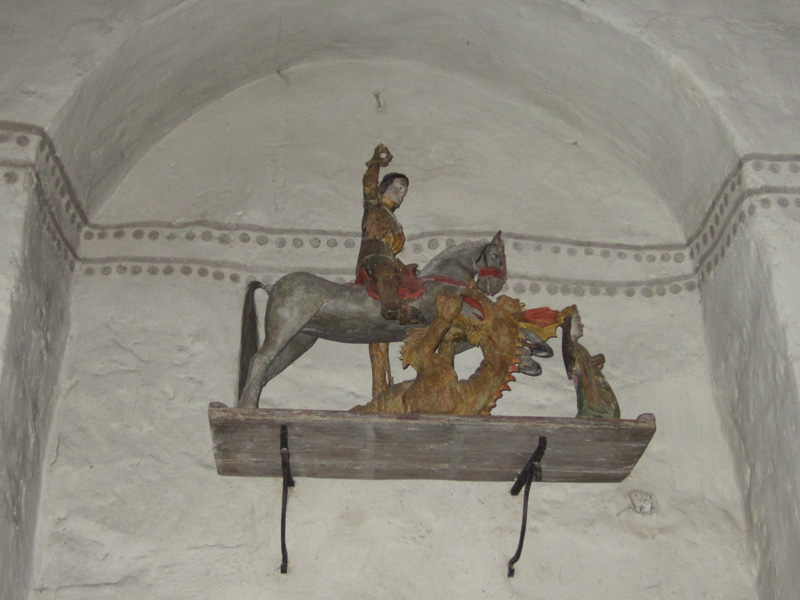
"Sankt Göran och draken", c. 1490: A medieval wooden sculpture depicting Saint George and the Dragon.

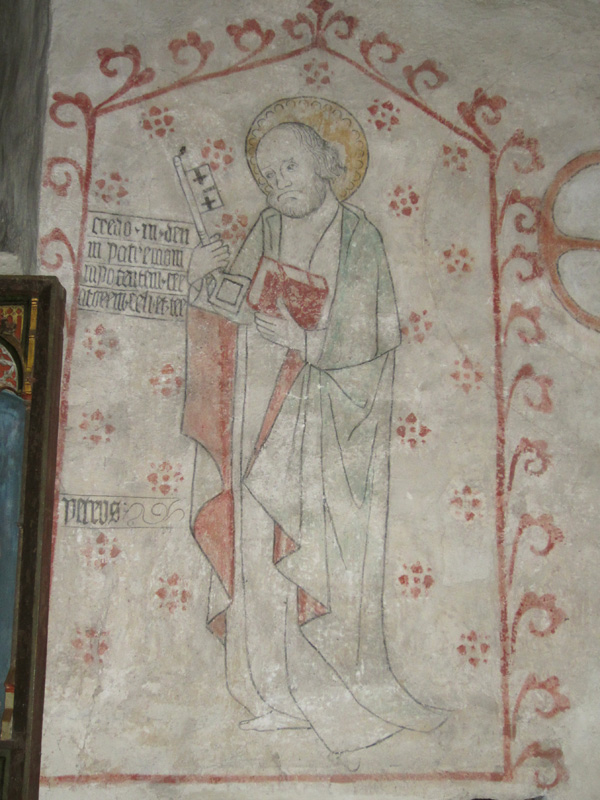
Late Gothic painting depicting Saint Peter.

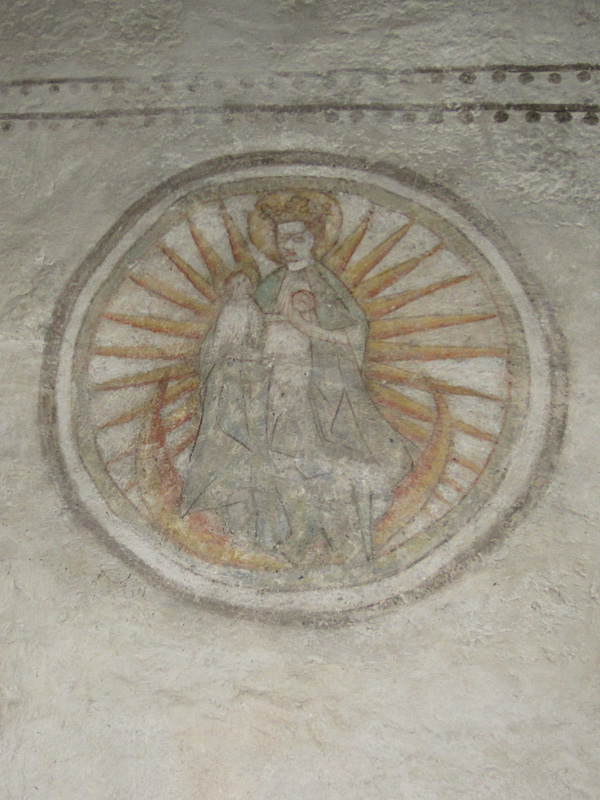
Virgin Mary possibly depicted as Stella Maris on the wall of the church.

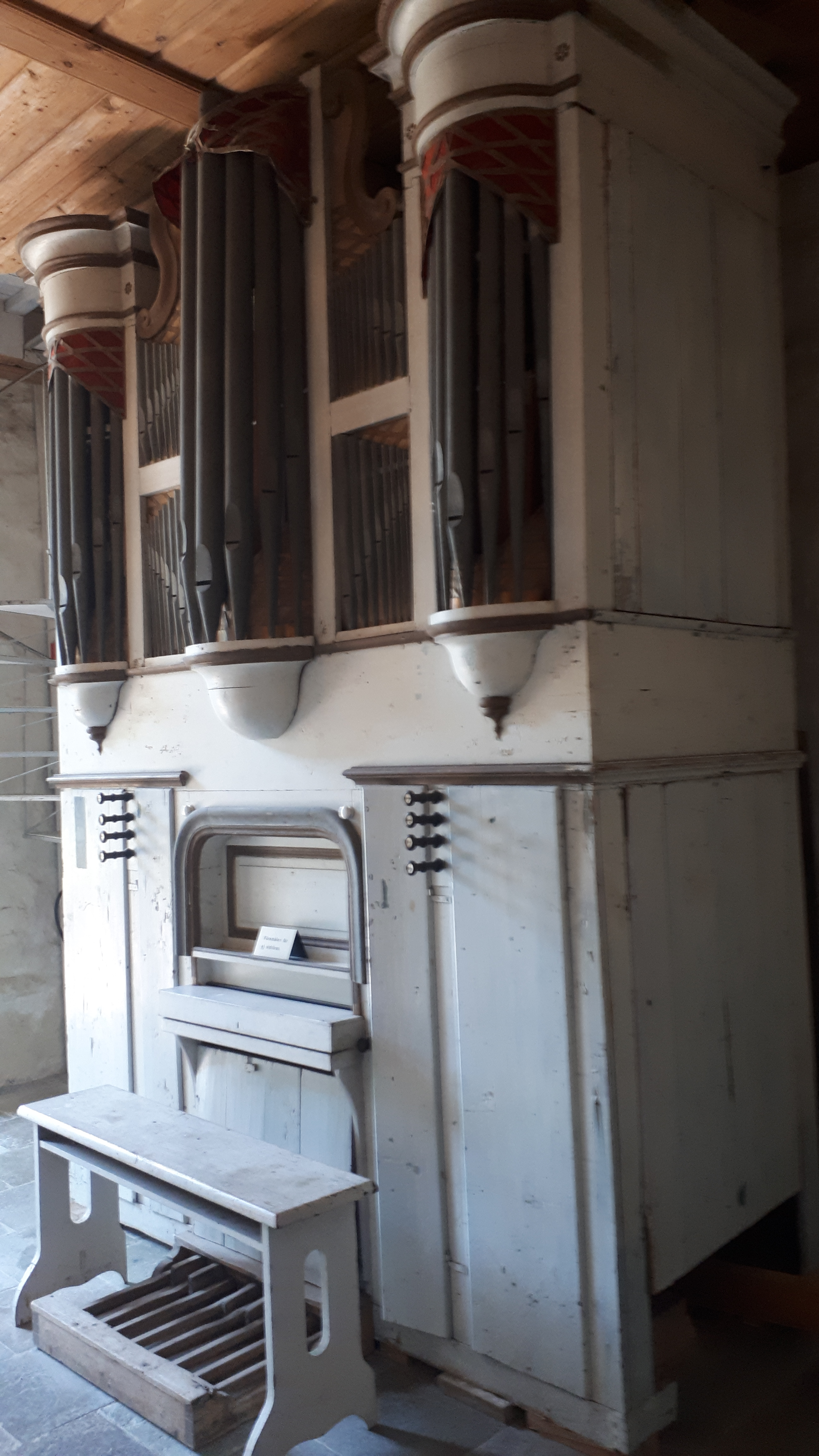
The old organ of the church.

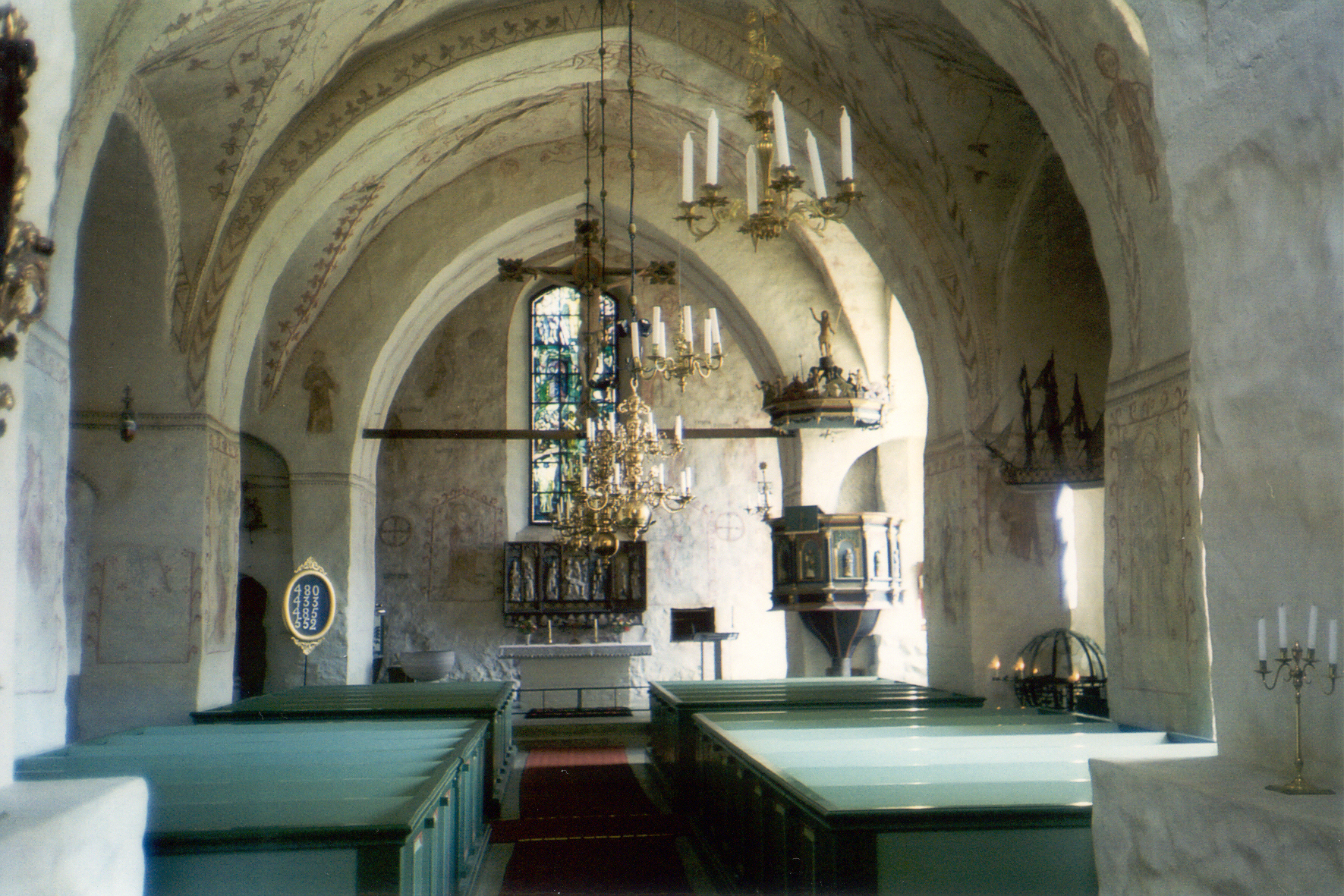
Interior.

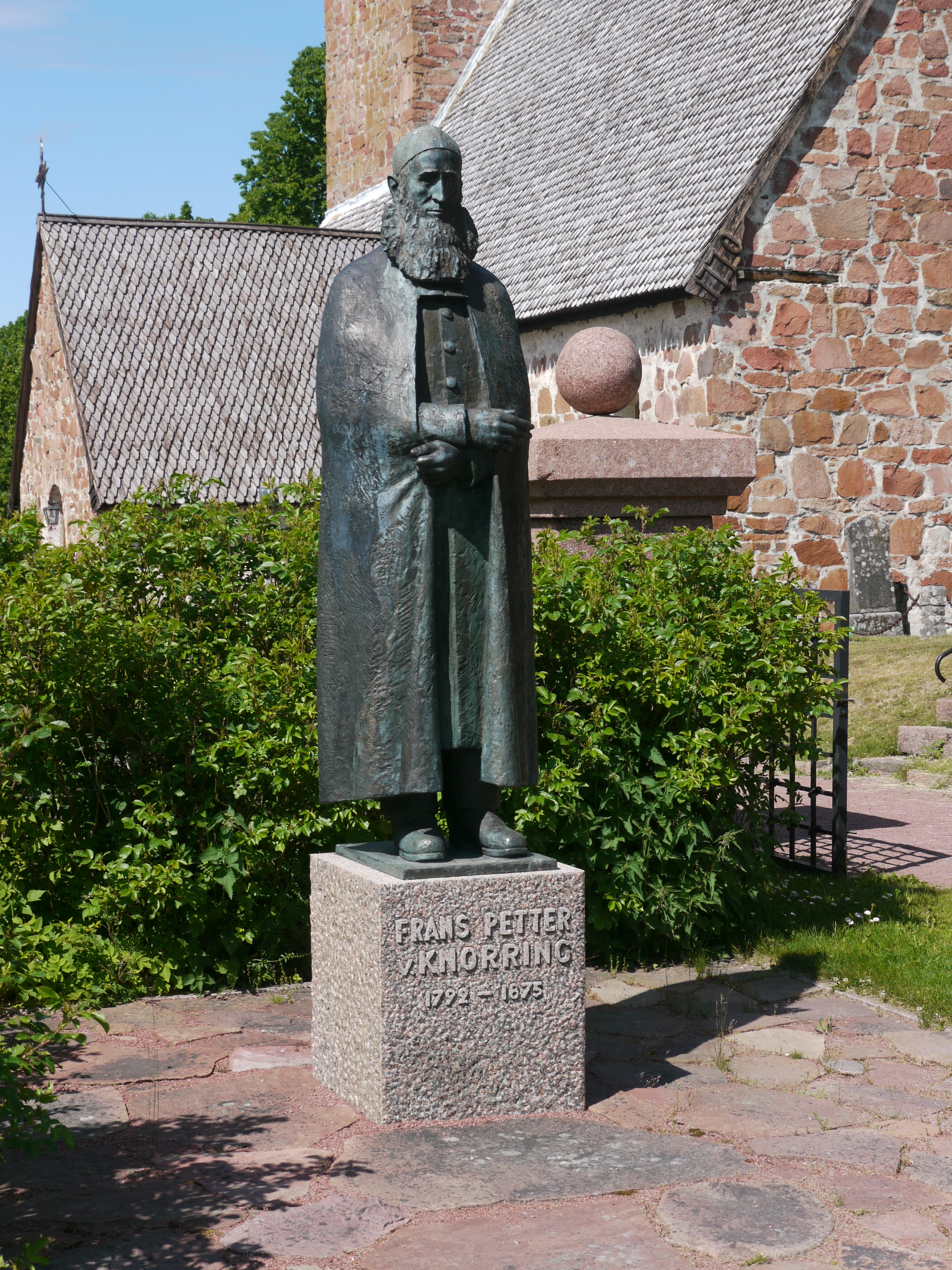
A sculpture of von Knorring outside the church.
