= St Michael-on-the-Mount =

Former church in Lincoln, Lincolnshire, England

- Church of St Michael-on-the-Mount
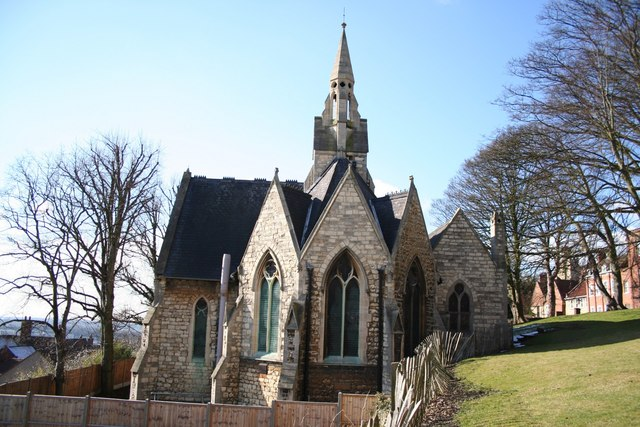
- St Michael on the Mount Church, now occupied by a hotel known as "The Old Palace Lodge Lincoln"
- St Michael-on-the-Mount
- 53.2333°N 0.5378°W
- OS grid reference: SK 97695 71685
- Location: Lincoln, Lincolnshire
- Country: England
- Previous denomination: Church of England

History
- Status: Redundant, now in use as a hotel
- Consecrated: 1000 AD/1855

Architecture
- Functional status: Listed Building
- Heritage designation: Grade II
- Designated: 02 October 1969
- Architect: Samuel Sanders Teulon
- Style: Gothic Revival (1855-56) (Rebuild)
- Years built: 1000 AD (Original), 1855 (Rebuild)
- Completed: 1000 AD (Original), 1855-56 (Rebuild)
- Closed: 1998

Administration
- Diocese: Lincoln

St Michael-on-the-Mount is a former parish church in the city of Lincoln in the ceremonial county of Lincolnshire, England. A church was originally built on the site in around 1000 AD. This was ruinous by the late 17th century period and was replaced by a new church in the 18th. This was itself superseded by the present church, built to the designs of Samuel Sanders Teulon in 1855-56. The church was declared redundant and deconsecrated in 1998. It now operates as a hotel, The Old Palace Lodge Lincoln. The church is a Grade II listed building.

== History ==
=== First church (1000–1740) ===
St Michael on the Mount was originally built with its own churchyard in 1000 AD as one of the many parish churches in the Lincoln area and district. The church is referenced in the Domesday Book, making it one of the oldest recorded churches in Lincoln. It was originally the home of Lincoln's Guild of Corpus Christi in 1350. It was then used as a guild chapel and a chantry was founded in the church by Robert Dyghton in 1521. The church survived the Reformation period but did not survive the English Civil War in 1644 and was later reduced to ruin. After the war, the church was in a state of disrepair, with nothing but the walls still standing. A much smaller church was later built on the site between 1739–1740 by Thomas Sympson.

=== Second church (1856–1998) ===
A new church with same name was built near Christ's Hospital in 1855–1856 by the Gothic Revival architect SS Teulon. Teulon's design included a spire, an octagonal bell turret and a finial. The church was listed as a Grade II building in 1969 by Historic England. In 1998, with a dwindling congregation, the church was declared redundant by the Church of England and Diocese of Lincoln,

== Present day ==
The church underwent a £850,000 renovation which was undertaken by Franklin Ellis Architects on behalf of the Diocese of Lincoln to secure the building and its foundations. It was then converted into a 16-bedroom hotel which retains all the historical parts of the church. It is now in use as the Old Palace Lodge Hotel Lincoln.

== Sources ==
- Hill, Francis (1948). Medieval Lincoln. Cambridge: Cambridge University Press. OCLC 276368.
- Pevsner, Nikolaus; Harris, John; Antram, Nicholas (2002). Lincolnshire. The Buildings of England. New Haven, US and London: Yale University Press. ISBN 0-300-09620-8.
