= St. Michael's Hospital =

St. Michael's Hospital may refer to the following hospitals:

== Canada ==
- St. Michael's Hospital (Toronto)

== Ireland ==
- St. Michael's Hospital (Dún Laoghaire)

== United Kingdom ==
- St Michael's Hospital, Braintree
- St Michael's Hospital, Bristol
- St Michael's Hospital, Hayle
- St Michael's Hospital, Linlithgow
- St Michael's Hospital, Warwick

== United States ==
- Saint Michael's Medical Center, an historical hospital in Newark, New Jersey

== Georgia ==
- St Michael's University Hospital, Tbilisi
