= Lasthenes (Thrace) =

Town of ancient Thrace

Coordinates: 41°06′54″N 29°03′09″E

Lasthenes (Ancient Greek: Λασθένης) or Leosthenes (Λεωσθένης) or Leosthenion (Λεωσθένιον) or Leostheneion (Λεωσθένειον) or Sosthenion (Σωσθένιον) was a town of ancient Thrace, inhabited during Roman and Byzantine times. Pliny the Elder records the name as Casthenes, which is generally taken to be a corruption of Lasthenes or Leosthenes.

Its site is located near İstinye in European Turkey.
