= Michaelion =

Sanctuary dedicated to Archangel Michael

The Michaelion was one of the earliest and most famous sanctuaries dedicated to Saint Michael the Archangel in the Roman Empire. According to tradition, it was built in the 4th century by Emperor Constantine the Great (r. 306–337) over an ancient pagan temple, and was located just north of Constantinople (modern Istanbul), in the village of Sosthenion (modern İstinye) on the European shore of the Bosphorus strait.

The pagan temple which had existed there had been previously associated with healing and medicine, and the Christians continued to associate the location and the Michaelion with healing waters.

Michaelion became a model for hundreds of other churches in Eastern Christianity.

== Foundation ==
A temple called Leosthenion (Greek: Λεωσθένιον) or Sosthenion (Greek: Σωσθένιον) had existed at the location prior to the 4th century. The site corresponds to modern Istinye.

According to a widespread tradition, current already since the 6th century, the Church of St. Michael at Sosthenion was founded by Constantine the Great, who visited the temple, erected by the Argonauts and dedicated to Zeus Sosthenios or a winged deity. Constantine interpreted the winged statue of the temple as a Christian angel. After sleeping the night in the temple, Constantine reported a vision that the angel was the Archangel Michael, and converted the building into a church to honor him. However, according to the French scholar Raymond Janin, this tradition is most probably later invention, created in competition with the other great shrine to Michael, at nearby Anaplous, which was of earlier date. It is certain however that the church of St. Michael existed at the turn of the 6th century, for the rebel Vitalian made it his headquarters and Emperor Anastasius I (r. 491–518) visited it in 515. In addition, early 5th-century Eastern Christian historian Sozomen recorded the devotions by the crowds at Michaelion and wrote of first-hand reports of healings at Michaelion, stating that he had himself received a healing. The pagan temple had been previously associated with healing and medicine and the Christian tradition continued to associate the location and the Michaelion with healing waters.

By the late 9th century, the church had fallen in ruin, until it was rebuilt by Basil I the Macedonian (r. 867–886). As an imperial foundation, it soon eclipsed its rival at Anaplous. A monastery was attached to the church at an unknown later date. It is first securely attested in the 11th century and is continuously mentioned until 1337. Janin hypothesizes that it was demolished in the 15th century, and its material used in the construction of the nearby Rumelihisarı fortress.

== Battle and iconography ==
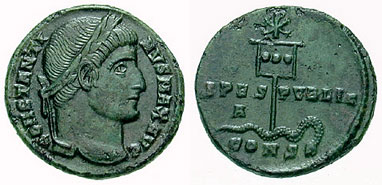
A Constantine coin (c.337) showing his labarum spearing a serpent.

Constantine was the first Roman Emperor to become a Christian and in 313 AD along with his co-Emperor Licinius signed the Edict of Milan, allowing Christians to worship freely and build public churches, rather than worshiping in secret. However, Constantine and Licinius later fought each other and in 324 AD Constantine defeated Licinius at the Battle of Adrianople, not far from the Michaelion - attributing the victory to Archangel Michael.

Constantine felt that both Licinius and Arius were agents of Satan, and associated them with the serpent described in the Book of Revelation (12:9). Constantine represented Licinius as a snake on his coins. After the victory, Constantine commissioned a depiction of himself and his sons slaying Licinius represented as a serpent - a symbolism borrowed from the Christian teachings on the Archangel to whom he attributed the victory. A similar painting, this time with the Archangel Michael himself slaying a serpent then became a major art piece at the Michaelion and eventually lead to the standard iconography of Archangel Michael as a warrior saint.

== A model for other churches ==
After the construction of the church a monastery was added to it, and thereafter four other churches in honor of Archangel Michael followed it in Constantinople. During the reign of the next several emperors after Constantine, the number of churches dedicated to Archangel Michael in Constantinople increased to fifteen.

Michaelion was a magnificent church and based on the reports of miracles there it became a model for hundreds of other churches in Eastern Christianity. However, Churches dedicated to the Archangel in Western Christianity lagged those in the East for some time.

As at the Michaelion, the association of Archangel Michael with healing and protection continued into the 6th century, when after a plague in Rome, the sick slept at night in the church of Castel Sant'Angelo dedicated to him for saving Rome from the plague.

== See also ==
- St. Michael's Church (disambiguation)
- Cathedral of Saint Michael (disambiguation)
- Michael (archangel)
- Saint Michael in the Catholic Church
