= St Michael's GAA =

St Michael's GAA may refer to:

- St Michael's GAA (Donegal), a sports club in Creeslough and Dunfanaghy, Ireland
- St Michael's/Foilmore, a sports club in South Kerry, Ireland
- St Michael's GAA (Galway), a sports club in the western city of Galway in Ireland
- St Michael's GAA (Meath), a sports club in Kells, Ireland
- St Michael's GAA (Roscommon), a sports club in Cootehall, Ireland
- St Michael's GAA (Sligo), a sports club in Killanummery and Ballintogher, Ireland

== See also ==
- Lissan GAC, a sports club occasionally referred to as St Michael's
- St Michael's GAC (Down), a sports club
- St Michael's Gaelic Football Club, a sports club in Blackrock, Cork, Ireland
- St Michael's GFC, Killean, a sports club
- St Michael's GAC, Newtownhamilton, a sports club
