= Rogate Monastery St. Michael =

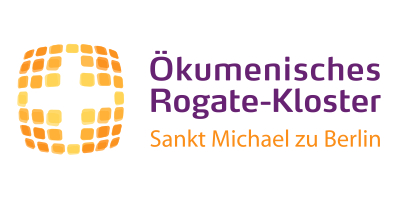
Ecumenical Rogate Monastery St. Michael in Berlin

The Rogate Monastery St. Michael (German: Rogate-Kloster St. Michael zu Berlin) is an ecumenical Christian monastery in Berlin. It was founded on September 29, 2010, the feast day of St. Michael the Archangel. He was the patron saint for the project to establish a monastery for all Christian denominations in Germany's capital city. The monastery is a place of hope, where prayers are offered and the Holy Eucharist is celebrated without separation (cf. open communion). The driving force behind this endeavor is Lutheran Augustinian Brother, Francis M. Schaar. The Rogate Monastery St. Michael has Christian brothers and sisters from the Evangelical Lutheran, Roman Catholic, and Reformed traditions, among others. It is recognized by the Protestant Church Berlin - Brandenburg - Silesian Upper Lusatia and the Catholic Diocese of the Old Catholics in Germany.
