= Saint Michael's Catholic Church (Galena, Illinois) =

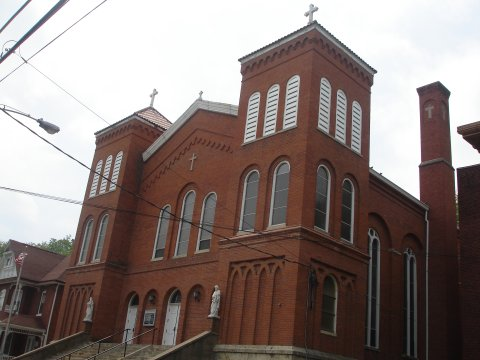
- Saint Michael's Catholic Church
- 42°24′55.1″N 90°25′49.2″W
- Location: 227 South Bench Street, Galena, Illinois
- Country: United States
- Denomination: Roman Catholic
- Website: Saint Michael's Web site

History
- Status: Parish church
- Founded: August 22, 1832
- Founder: Samuel Charles Mazzuchelli

Architecture
- Style: Romanesque Revival

Specifications
- Length: 135 feet
- Width: 60 feet
- Height: 35 feet

Administration
- Archdiocese: Chicago
- Diocese: Rockford

Clergy
- Archbishop: Francis George
- Bishop: David John Malloy

Saint Michael's Church is a parish of the Roman Catholic Diocese of Rockford. The church is located in Galena, Illinois, United States, at 227 South Bench Street in Galena.

The parish is named after the Archangel Michael, and is seated on a hill overlooking downtown Galena.

== History ==
The parish was founded by the pioneer priest, Father Samuel Charles Mazzuchelli, who served as pastor of the parish from 1835 to 1843, and during this time directed the building of a church. This building served until it was destroyed by a fire which had consumed a good portion of downtown Galena.

Father Mazzuchelli began working with St. Michael's parish to build a new building to replace the one lost in the fire. Designed in the Romanesque Revival style, this is the largest church designed by Father Mazzuchelli. The new building has a truss formation to hold the weight of the roof, which helped eliminate the need for pillars within the church. This building still stands today, and continues to serve as a place of worship.

The current rectory was built in 1896.

== See also ==
- Saint Michael: Roman Catholic traditions and views
