= St. Michael's Cathedral, Cherkasy =

Coordinates: 49°26′02″N 32°03′31″E

Saint Michael's Cathedral
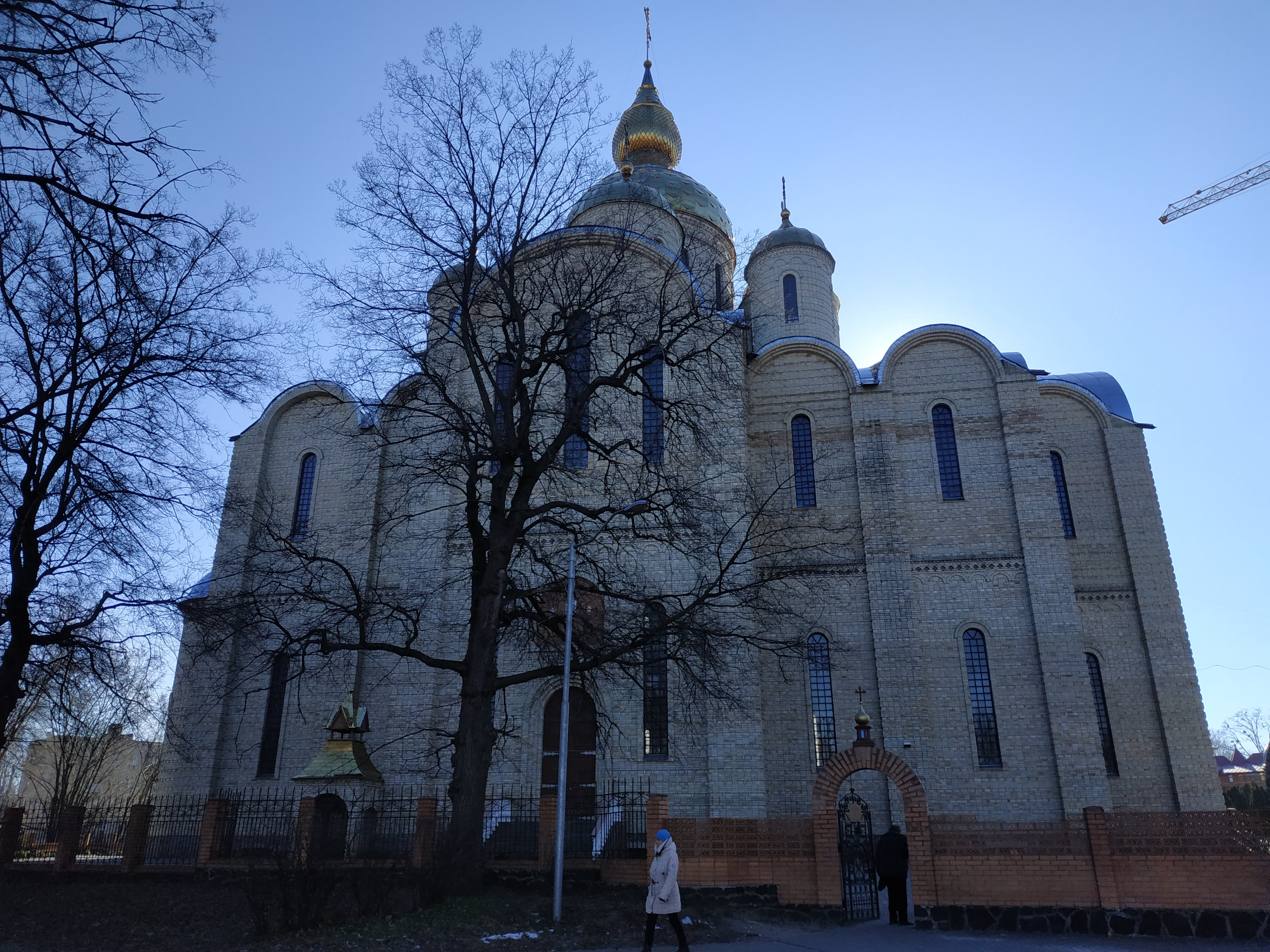

Religion
- Affiliation: Ukrainian Orthodox
- Ecclesiastical or organisational status: Active
- Status: Active

Location
- Location: Cherkasy, Ukraine
- Interactive map of Saint Michael's Cathedral

Architecture
- Groundbreaking: 1994
- Completed: 2000

Specifications
- Capacity: 12,000
- Length: 58 meters
- Width: 54 meters
- Height (max): 74 meters
- Dome: 9

St. Michael's Cathedral (Ukrainian: Михайлівський катедральний собор) is an Orthodox church located in Cherkasy in central Ukraine. The church was constructed in 2000. The Orthodox Church of Ukraine took possession of the church on 17 October 2024. It is one of the biggest in Ukraine, and can hold up to 12,000 worshipers at one time.

== See also ==
- List of largest Eastern Orthodox church buildings
