= Saint Michael's Cathedral, Sochi =

Church in Sochi, Russia

Coordinates: 43°34′46″N 39°43′20″E

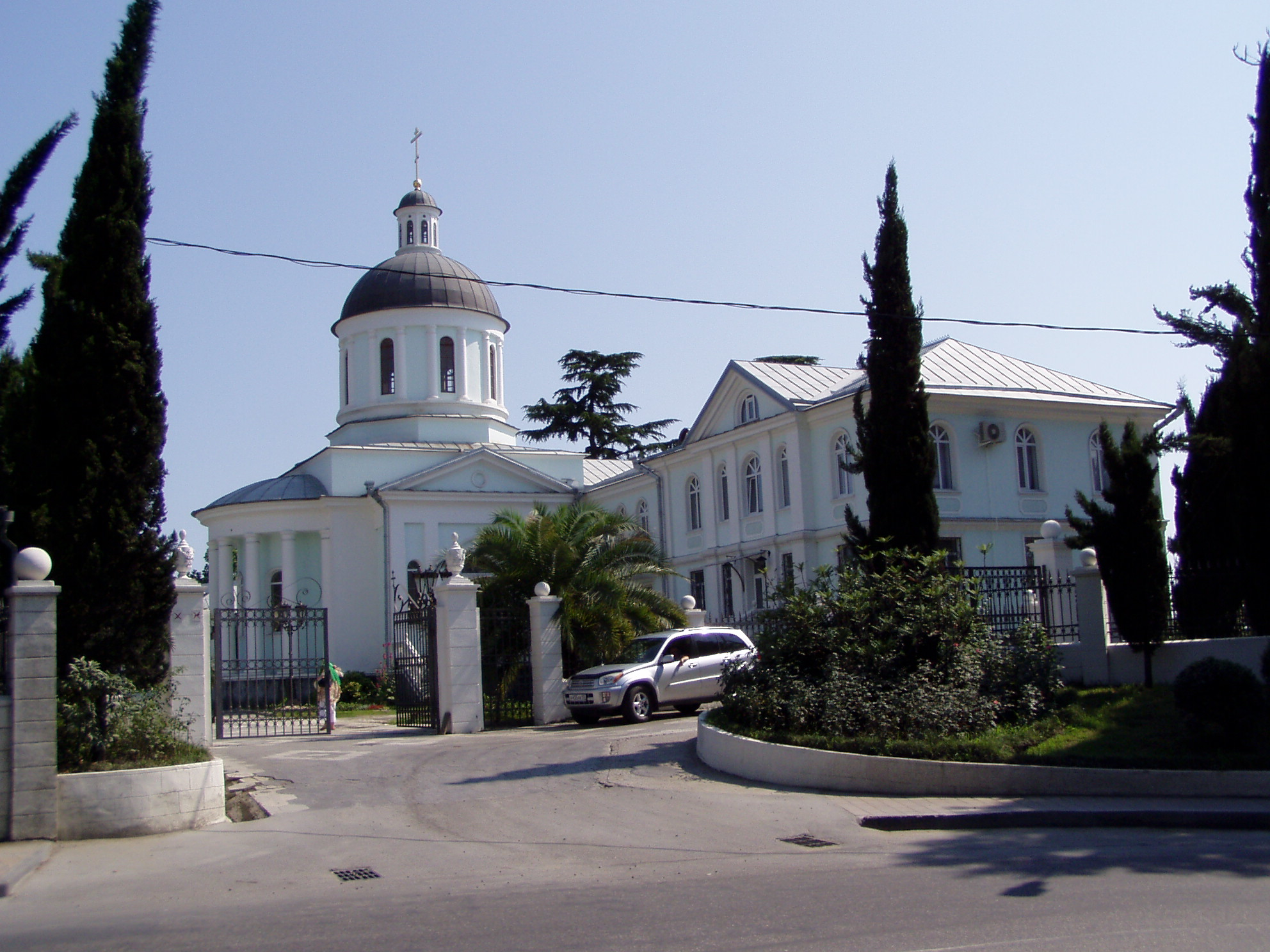
The baptistery and the sunday school

The Cathedral of St. Michael the Archangel is the oldest Orthodox church in Sochi and the entire Black Sea Oblast of the former Russian Empire. Its construction was decreed by Grand Duke Michael Nikolaevich of Russia with a view to commemorating the victorious conclusion of the prolonged Caucasian War in 1864.

The existing building was designed by Alexander Kaminsky. It was built between 1874 and 1890 with funds provided by Savva Mamontov and Count Felix Felixovich Sumarokov-Elston, among others. The church, long neglected by the Soviets, was restored in 1993. The domed baptistery and the sunday school were built next to the church in the 1990s.
