= St Michael's Catholic Church, Moor Street =

Coordinates: 52.48004°N 1.89269°W

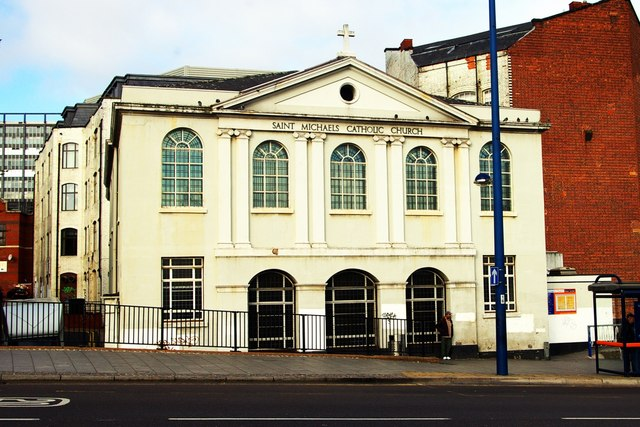
- St Michael's Catholic Church, Moor Street
- St Michael's Catholic Church, Moor Street
- OS grid reference: SP 07382 86910
- Location: Birmingham
- Country: England
- Denomination: Roman Catholicism
- Previous denomination: Unitarianism

History
- Status: Parish Church
- Dedication: St Michael

Architecture
- Functional status: Active
- Heritage designation: Grade II listed
- Completed: 1803

Administration
- Archdiocese: Birmingham

St Michael's Catholic Church is a Catholic church located on Moor Street in Birmingham, England. It received Grade II listed building status on 25 April 1952. Formerly it was the New Meeting, a chapel of the English Dissenters.

== History ==
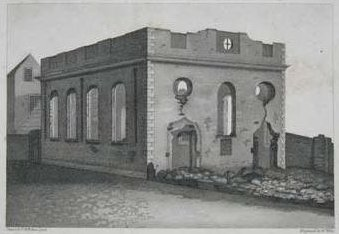
New Meeting, after its destruction during the Priestley Riots (Etching by William Ellis after a drawing by P. H. Witton)

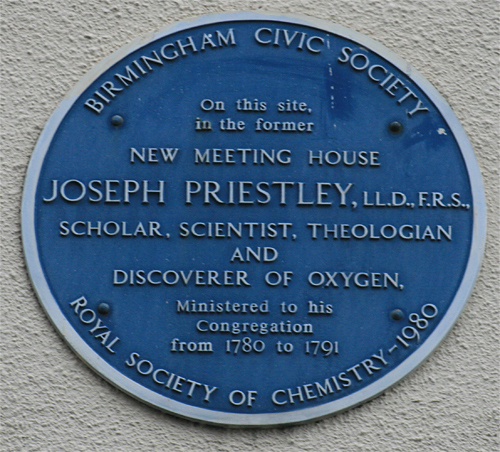
The Joseph Priestley blue plaque

The building was first erected in 1726, but was burnt down by the 1791 Priestley Riots, which targeted Dr. Joseph Priestley, who had been the minister at the Unitarian New Meeting since 1780. The Unitarian New Meeting House was rebuilt ten years later and reopened in 1803. A blue plaque on the building commemorates Priestley.

When the New Meeting House became unsuitable for its congregation, they started construction on a new place of worship on Broad Street. The New Meeting House was purchased, remodelled and consecrated as a Roman Catholic Church in 1862, at the time catering for a large influx of Irish and Italian immigrants who had settled in the area, leading to the church being known as "the Italian church".

Following World War II, the church was adopted by the exiled Polish ex-servicemen and their families, and again has seen an influx in Polish congregations following the 2004 accession of Poland into the European Union, causing the congregation to grow fourfold. This has led to the creation of separate Polish Mass services.

Prior to moving into St Michael's Church, the first Catholic mission in Birmingham was founded in Masshouse Lane in 1687 by the Franciscan Fathers. When this was burnt down in anti-Catholic riots in 1688, Mass continued to be offered in various improvised chapels until 1862.
