= St. Michael's Monastery Church, Nivan =

Cultural monument of Albania

St. Michael's Monastery Church
- Kisha e Manastirit të Shën Mëhillit (Albanian)
- Interactive map of St. Michael's Monastery Church
- 40.079778°N 20.134917°E
- Location: Nivan

Cultural Monument of Albania

St. Michael's Monastery Church (Albanian: Kisha e Manastirit të Shën Mëhillit) is a monastery church in Nivan, Gjirokastër County, Albania. It is a Cultural Monument of Albania.
