= Billy Deans (diver) =

American pioneering wreck and technical diver

"Captain" Billy Deans is a pioneering wreck and technical diver. "Captain" is the nickname which is widely applied to Billy Deans, however he is a US Coast Guard-rated captain up to 100 tons.

== Career ==
Deans is a former member of the board of directors of International Association of Nitrox and Technical Divers (IANTD). He was an instructor for the United States Army Corps of Engineers, and taught Special forces divers for the United States Army and the United States Navy. He is also a Professional Association of Diving Instructors (PADI) and National Association of Underwater Instructors (NAUI) recreational diving instructor.

Billy Deans was one of the early pioneers in the use of trimix for deep diving. During the exploration of U-869 chronicled in the best selling book, Shadow Divers, John Chatterton and Richie Kohler sought instruction from Billy Deans in the use of trimix (which had, until then, largely been restricted to cave exploration diving in Florida). These presaged a number of North Eastern wreck divers to seek trimix training from Billy Deans, leading to its popularity as a deep diving breathing gas.

Billy Deans has been involved in a number of high-profile shipwreck expeditions over the years, including Gary Gentile's expedition to the USS Monitor, various exploration dives on the SS Andrea Doria, the USS Wilkes-Barre and U-2513. In late 1993, Billy Deans served as Dive Operations Officer for an expedition recovering treasure and artifacts from a Spanish brigantine which sank in the Gulf of Mexico off New Orleans.

Billy Deans ran a dive shop (known as Key West Diver) in Key West, FL for many years prior to retiring from diving in 1998.

He qualified as an ICU nurse.

== Accolades ==
In Kevin McMurray's book, Deep Descent, he refers to an unspecified third party publication describing Billy Deans as "the world's best diver".
