= Bill Nagle =

American wreck diving pioneer

Walter William Nagle Jr "Bill" Nagle (1952–1993) was a pioneering American wreck diver.

== Diving ==
Bill Nagle was one of the earliest divers to dive regularly beyond diver training agency specified depth limits for safe deep diving (normally 130 feet in sea water). Nagle regularly dived to greater depths, and engaged in hazardous shipwreck penetration, often on previously unexplored shipwrecks.

In 1985 Nagle led the team of divers, including Gary Gentile, Art Kirchner, Tom Packer, Mike Boring, John Moyer and Kenny Gascon, who recovered the bell of the Andrea Doria, which had previously been thought lost and unrecoverable. The story of the recovery expedition is recounted in Gary Gentile's book, Andrea Doria: Dive to an Era.

Nagle was also one of the first people in the Northeastern United States to commence dive chartering as a full-time business with the custom dive vessel, the Seeker.

During Nagle's prime, divers who exceeded agency specified safety limits were simply referred to as "gorilla divers".

== Alcoholism and death ==
The later years of Nagle's life were dominated by a descent into alcoholism and drug abuse. It was this disease that ultimately took his life at the age of 41. His last great expedition was the exploration of German submarine U-869, although he was never physically able to dive on it. Nagle died before the wreck was positively identified.

His close friend, John Chatterton refused to attend his funeral, insisting that the man inside the coffin was not his friend and associate - it was the monster who had killed Bill Nagle. Richie Kohler, another diver closely connected with the U-869 expedition, was one of the pallbearers.

== Bibliography ==
Gentile, Gary (1989). Andrea Doria: Dive To An Era. Philadelphia, PA: Gary Gentile Productions. ISBN 0-9621453-0-0. OCLC 20452302.
