= William Nagle =

William Nagle may refer to:

- William Nagle (author) (1947–2002), Australian author
- William Nagle (American football), American football coach
- William Nagle (figure skater) (1885–1970), American figure skater
- William P. Nagle Jr. (born 1951), American politician

== See also ==
- Bill Nagle (1952–1993), American wreck diver
- Bill Nagel (William Taylor Nagel, 1915–1981), Major League Baseball player
