= Shadow Divers =

Book by Robert Kurson recounting the discovery of a World War II German U-boat wreck

- Paperback cover of Shadow Divers
- Author: Robert Kurson
- Language: English
- Genre: non-fiction history adventure
- Publisher: Random House
- Publication date: 2004
- Publication place: United States
- Media type: Print (Hardback & Paperback)
- Pages: 397 pp (paperback)
- ISBN: 0-375-76098-9 (paperback)
- OCLC: 60426012
- Dewey Decimal: 910.452

Shadow Divers: The True Adventure of Two Americans Who Risked Everything to Solve One of the Last Mysteries of World War II is a 2004 non-fiction book by Robert Kurson recounting of the discovery of a World War II German U-boat 60 miles (97 km) off the coast of New Jersey, United States in 1991, exploration dives, and its eventual identification as U-869 lost on 11 February 1945.

== Overview ==
In 1991, a group of divers, including John Chatterton, set out on Seeker to explore an unknown object lying 230 feet (70 m) below the surface of the Atlantic Ocean off the coast of New Jersey, and discover a World War II German U-boat. Amazed at this discovery, Chatterton and his fellow divers make a pact to keep the U-boat a secret until they can discover its identity and claim credit for its discovery. This is to prevent "wreck-jumping" (wherein another person claims credit and/or removes objects from the wreck). Unfortunately, this pact is broken almost immediately by team members who tell close friends, and the secret is let out. Consulting both the United States Navy and the German Navy yields denials of the possibility of a World War II-era U-boat wreck in that area. Historical records claim the closest U-boat wreck to be hundreds of miles away.

The book chronicles the quest to learn the identity of the mysterious wreck, dubbed U-Who by the dive team, the identities of the men aboard her, and how she came to rest on the ocean floor near New Jersey. It took six years of dives to retrieve artifacts from the submarine plus research to confirm the boat's identity as U-869.

Over the length of the quest several members of the original dive team quit, either because their lives lead them elsewhere or over concerns for their safety. Several new members were brought in, including Richie Kohler, a member of the notorious "Atlantic Wreck Divers" club that had the reputation of being pirate-like and reckless in their diving philosophy. This philosophy is the complete opposite of Chatterton's, and Chatterton initially dislikes Kohler. However, during the course of the quest the two men discover qualities in each other they both admire and respect. Kohler himself is driven not by monetary desires but the history behind the wreck, and the personal connection he feels as his family is of German descent. He and Chatterton ultimately become close friends.

The quest for the identity of the U-boat and its occupants pushes the dive team to the limits, ultimately ending Chatterton's and Kohler's marriages, and the lives of three divers, including Steve Feldman, and the father-son team Chris Rouse, Sr. and Chris "Chrisy" Rouse, Jr.

== In media ==
=== Books ===
Gary Gentile's self-published, non-fiction book Shadow Divers Exposed: the Real Saga of the U-869 (2006) challenges some of the facts about the sinking of U-869. Gentile, a noted wreck diver, researcher, and author, sharply refutes Chatterton and Kohler's theory of how U-869 sank. Gentile cites attack logs and eyewitness accounts from the crew of two destroyer escorts that suggest the U-boat was initially damaged with a hedgehog launched by USS Howard D. Crow and then subsequently damaged with a depth charge by the accompanying USS Koiner. Gentile also contradicts the events on deck after the Rouses' fatal dive.

=== Television ===
The PBS NOVA episode, "Hitler's Lost Sub" (November 14, 2000), followed Chatterton and Kohler in their quest to identify the sub.

=== Music ===
Musician Adam Young of the group Owl City wrote the song "Brielle" after having read Shadow Divers: "Brielle is a little town on the coast of New Jersey. I wrote the song after reading Shadow Divers by Robert Kurson in which he recounts the discovery of a World War II German U-boat sixty miles off the U.S. coast in 1991. The song describes a sailor who is about to leave on a long trip and wonders whether he will ever see the girl he loves again."

== Honors ==
- American Booksellers Association's Non-fiction 2005 Book Sense Book of the Year Award
- American Library Association Alex Award, 2005
- New York Times Best Seller list
