= Gary Gentile =

American author and pioneering technical diver

Gary Gentile (born 1946) is an American author and pioneering technical diver.

== Diving ==
Gary Gentile is a wreck diver. It has been suggested that Gary Gentile may be the most experienced wreck diver in the world. He has dived on the wreck of the SS Andrea Doria (sometimes referred to as the "Mount Everest" of SCUBA diving) over 190 times, and was the first diver to penetrate the first class dining room of the vessel. He was also part of the team of divers, along with Bill Nagle, who recovered the ship's bell in 1985.

During the early 1990s, Gentile pioneered the use of mixed gases in wreck diving. He has also participated in expeditions to the SMS Ostfriesland at a depth of 380 feet (116 m), which would serve as the impetus for greater exploration of deep-water shipwrecks, and the RMS Lusitania at a depth of 300 feet (91 m).

He achieved fame within the diving community with his publication of The Advanced Wreck Diving Guide in 1988. He also published the first book on technical diving, The Technical Diving Handbook, and the field began to gain recognition as a separate stratum of the sport from conventional recreational diving. In many of his books Gentile notes that before technical diving was recognised as a sub-stratum of the sport, divers who consciously engaged in planned decompression diving were shunned by major diver training agencies as "gorilla divers".

Gentile was also instrumental in securing the rights of sport divers to dive on the wreck of the USS Monitor. After eleven attempts to get a special use permit from the National Oceanic & Atmospheric Administration he filed suit against the U.S. Department of Commerce and won.

== Author ==
Gary Gentile has self-published 45 books. He has written several technical books relating to diving, as well as extensive documentation of the shipwrecks of North America. He has also published a number of futuristic fantasy fictional works, although none of these have been a notable commercial success to date.

== Shadow Divers controversy ==
The publication of the 2004 book Shadow Divers, a New York Times bestseller, brought a huge amount of publicity to the North East American wreck diving community, and turned the two divers featured in the book, John Chatterton and Richie Kohler into media stars. Although the book only referred to Gary Gentile once (referring to him, at page 313 as "legendary wreck diver, Gary Gentile"), he published a stinging rebuttal to the book entitled Shadow Divers Exposed in which he challenges the version of events in the original book and level of credit given to Kohler and Chatterton, and puts forward an alternative hypothesis for the sinking of U-869.

Gentile's book divided the diving community between those who regarded it as a cheap shot, motivated by jealousy of the fame which Chatteron and Kohler had enjoyed as a result of the book, and those who believed it was a fair attempt to set the record straight and ensure that credit was given to others who had played a key role in identifying the submarine.

== Other ==
Gary Gentile served in the 25th Infantry Division during the Vietnam War where he was severely wounded. A number of his non-fiction works refer to his experiences in Vietnam.

== Bibliography ==
=== Non-fiction ===
- Shipwrecks of New Jersey (1988)
- Track of the Gray Wolf: U-Boat Warfare on the U.S. Eastern Seaboard, 1942-1945 (1989)
- Andrea Doria: Dive to an Era (1989)
- USS San Diego: The Last Armoured Cruiser (1989)
- Shipwrecks of Delaware and Maryland (1990)
- Shipwrecks of North Carolina from Hatteras Inlet south (1992)
- Shipwrecks of Virginia (1992)
- Ultimate Wreck-Diving Guide (1992)
- Advanced Wreck Diving Guide (1992)
- Shipwrecks of North Carolina from the Diamond Shoals North (1993)
- Ironclad Legacy: Battles of the USS Monitor (1993)
- Primary Wreck Diving Guide (1994)
- Wreck Diving Adventures (1994)
- The Nautical Cyclopedia (1995)
- Lonely Planet Shipwrecks of New York (1996)
- The Lusitania Controversies: Atrocity of War and a Wreck-Diving History (1998)
- The Technical Diving Handbook (1998)
- The Lusitania Controversies: Dangerous Descents into Shipwrecks and Law (1999)
- Great Lakes Shipwrecks: A Photographic Odyssey (2003)
- Shipwrecks of South Carolina and Georgia (2003)
- Shipwrecks of Rhode Island and Connecticut (2004)
- Deep, Dark, and Dangerous: Adventures and Reflections on the Andrea Doria (2005)
- Wilderness Canoeing: The Adventure and the Art (2005)
- Shadow Divers Exposed: The Real Saga of the U-869 (2006)
- The Führer's U-boats in American Waters (2006)

Stolen Heritage: The Grand Theft of the Hamilton and Scourge (2004)

=== Fiction ===
- Time for Dragons (series)
  - 1. A Time for Dragons (1989)
  - 2. Dragons Past (1990)
  - 3. No Future for Dragons (1990)
- The Lurking (1989)
- The Peking Papers (1992)
- Return to Mars (2005)
- Entropy (2006)
- Silent Autumn (2006)
- Lonely Conflict: A Novel of the Vietnam War (2006)
- Mind Set (2006)
- Memory Lane (2007)
- A Different Universe: Tales of Imagination (2005)
- A Different Dimension: More Tales of Imagination (2005)
