= USS Fowler =

Buckley-class destroyer escort

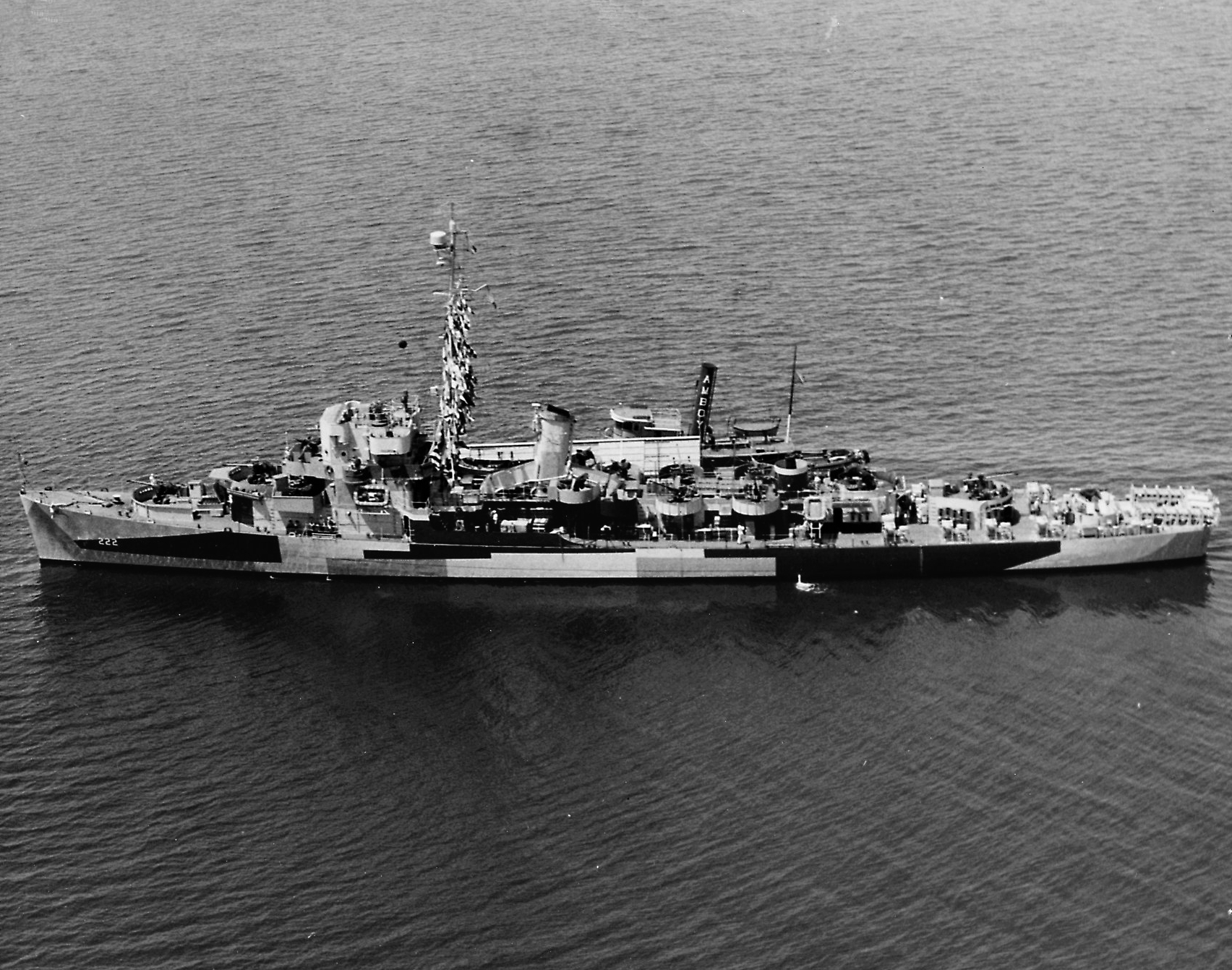
- Fowler on 22 July 1944

History

United States
- Name: USS Fowler
- Namesake: Robert L. Fowler
- Ordered: 1942
- Builder: Philadelphia Navy Yard, Philadelphia, Pennsylvania
- Laid down: 5 April 1943
- Launched: 3 July 1943
- Commissioned: 15 March 1944
- Decommissioned: 28 June 1946
- Stricken: 1 July 1965
- Honors and awards: 1 battle star (World War II)
- Fate: Sold for scrap, 29 December 1966

General characteristics
- Class & type: Buckley-class destroyer escort
- Displacement: 1,400 long tons (1,422 t) standard; 1,740 long tons (1,768 t) full load
- Length: 306 ft (93 m)
- Beam: 37 ft (11 m)
- Draft: 9 ft 6 in (2.90 m) standard; 11 ft 3 in (3.43 m) full load
- Propulsion: 2 × boilers; General Electric turbo-electric drive; 12,000 shp (8.9 MW); 2 × solid manganese-bronze 3,600 lb (1,600 kg) 3-bladed propellers, 8 ft 6 in (2.59 m) diameter, 7 ft 7 in (2.31 m) pitch; 2 × rudders; 359 tons fuel oil
- Speed: 23 knots (43 km/h; 26 mph)
- Range: 3,700 nmi (6,900 km) at 15 kn (28 km/h; 17 mph); 6,000 nmi (11,000 km) at 12 kn (22 km/h; 14 mph)
- Complement: 15 officers, 198 men
- Armament: 3 × 3"/50 caliber guns; 1 × quad 1.1"/75 caliber gun; 8 × single 20 mm guns; 1 × triple 21 inch (533 mm) torpedo tubes; 1 × Hedgehog anti-submarine mortar; 8 × K-gun depth charge projectors; 2 × depth charge tracks

USS Fowler (DE-222) was a Buckley-class destroyer escort in service with the United States Navy from 1944 to 1946. She was scrapped in 1967.

== History ==
Fowler was named in honor of Lieutenant (junior grade) Robert L. Fowler (1919-1942), who was killed in action, while serving aboard the destroyer Duncan (DD-485) during the Battle of Cape Esperance on the night of 11–12 October 1942. He was posthumously awarded the Navy Cross. Fowler was launched on 3 July 1943 by Philadelphia Navy Yard; sponsored by Mrs. Robert L. Fowler, III, widow of Lieutenant (junior grade) Fowler; and commissioned on 15 March 1944.

Between 22 May 1944 and 15 May 1945, Fowler made six voyages to escort convoys from New York, Norfolk, and Boston to ports in northern Africa, guarding men and supplies destined for the operations in Italy and southern France.

The fifth such voyage, between 1 February and 16 March 1945, was marked by the presence of submarines both outward and homeward bound. On 17 February, west of Gibraltar, two of the merchantmen were torpedoed, but both were brought safely into Gibraltar, one after Fowler had stood by to screen while a tug came out to help. Two days out of Oran homeward bound on 28 February, Fowler picked up a sound contact, and made an urgent attack which brought debris to the surface. A second attack, made in coordination with a French escort, was believed to have sunk U-869, however, as this submarine was subsequently found off the coast of New Jersey, what, if anything, was attacked remains unknown.

In June 1945, Fowler began serving as a target and escort to submarines training out of New London, Connecticut, then in September, arrived at Miami, Florida, to serve as schoolship for the Naval Training Center. Her final duty, in November, was as plane guard for the escort carrier Charger (CVE-30) in Chesapeake Bay. Fowler arrived at Green Cove Springs, Florida on 10 January 1946, and there was decommissioned and placed in reserve on 28 June 1946.

Fowler was struck from the Naval Vessel Register on 1 July 1965, and sold for scrapping on 29 December 1966.

== Awards ==
Fowler received one battle star for World War II service.
