= The Last Dive =

Non-fiction book by Bernie Chowdhury about a double wreck diving fatality

The Last Dive: A Father and Son's Fatal Descent into the Ocean's Depths
- Author: Bernie Chowdhury
- Cover artist: Wes Skiles/Karst Productions, Bradford Foltz
- Language: English
- Genre: Non-fiction adventure
- Publisher: HarperCollins Publishers, Harper Perennial
- Publication date: 2000, 2002
- Publication place: United States
- Media type: Print (Hardback & Paperback)
- Pages: 356 pp (hardback)
- ISBN: 0-06-019462-6 (hardback), ISBN 0-06-093259-7 (paperback)
- Dewey Decimal: 363.14, 797.23
- LC Class: 00-033426

The Last Dive: A Father and Son's Fatal Descent into the Ocean's Depths (2000) is a non-fiction book written by diver Bernie Chowdhury and published by HarperCollins. It documents the fatal dive of Chris Rouse, Sr. and Chris "Chrissy" Rouse, Jr., a father-son team who perished off the New Jersey coast in 1992. The author is a dive expert and was a friend of the Rouses.

The author is a technical diver who, according to writer Neal Matthews' review of Robert Kurson's book Shadow Divers (2004), "was among the first to adapt cave-diving principles to deep-water wrecks". Also according to Matthews, "His book documents how the clashes of equipment philosophy between cave divers and wreck divers mirrored the clash of diving subcultures."

== Synopsis ==
The Rouses were exploring a German U-boat in 230 feet (70 m) of water off the coast of New Jersey, which was subsequently identified as U-869. The pair had set out to retrieve the captain's log book from the so-called U-Who to "fulfill their dream of diving into fame." Although experienced in using technical diving gas mixtures such as "trimix" (adding helium gas to the nitrogen and oxygen found in air) which is recommended for extreme depths, the Rouses were diving on just compressed air to save costs.

The younger Rouse developed nitrogen narcosis and was trapped inside the U-boat, and though he was rescued by his father, the two had exhausted their air supplies. They were forced to make an uncontrolled ascent from extreme depths, without making the necessary stops to let the nitrogen in their blood safely dissolve, resulting in decompression sickness, or "the bends", which killed them.
