= Deep Sea Detectives =

Television series

- Starring: John Chatterton; Richie Kohler; Michael Norwood; Melanie Paul
- Country of origin: United States
- No. of series: 4
- No. of episodes: 72

Production
- Running time: 45 min

Original release
- Network: History Channel
- Release: 1 April 2003 – 17 April 2006

Deep Sea Detectives is a television show on the History Channel that aired for four seasons between 2003 and 2006. It was co-hosted by diver and historian Richie Kohler.
