= USS Koiner =

1943 Edsall-class destroyer escort

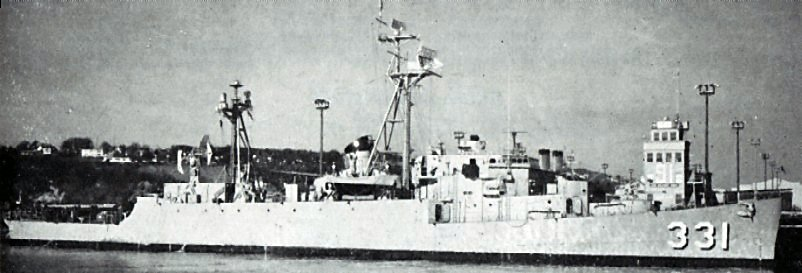

History

United States
- Namesake: James Duval Koiner
- Builder: Consolidated Steel Corporation, Orange, Texas
- Laid down: 26 July 1943
- Launched: 5 October 1943
- Commissioned: 27 December 1943
- Decommissioned: 1968
- Reclassified: DER-331, 28 October 1954
- Stricken: 23 September 1968
- Fate: Sold for scrapping 3 September 1969

United States
- Name: USCGC Koiner (WDE-431)
- Commissioned: 20 June 1951
- Decommissioned: 14 May 1954
- Fate: Returned to USN, 14 May 1954

General characteristics
- Class & type: Edsall-class destroyer escort
- Displacement: 1,253 tons standard; 1,590 tons full load
- Length: 306 feet (93.27 m)
- Beam: 36.58 feet (11.15 m)
- Draft: 10.42 full load feet (3.18 m)
- Propulsion: 4 FM diesel engines, 4 diesel-generators, 6,000 shp (4.5 MW), 2 screws
- Speed: 21 knots (39 km/h)
- Range: 9,100 nmi. at 12 knots; (17,000 km at 22 km/h)
- Complement: 8 officers, 201 enlisted
- Armament: 3 × single 3 in (76 mm)/50 guns; 1 × twin 40 mm AA guns; 8 × single 20 mm AA guns; 1 × triple 21 in (533 mm) torpedo tubes; 8 × depth charge projectors; 1 × depth charge projector (hedgehog); 2 × depth charge tracks

USS Koiner (DE-331) was an Edsall-class destroyer escort built for the U.S. Navy during World War II. She served in the Atlantic Ocean and the Pacific Ocean and provided destroyer escort protection against submarine and air attack for Navy vessels and convoys. Post-war, she was loaned to the U.S. Coast Guard, and also reclassified as a radar picket ship.

== Namesake ==
James Duval Koiner was born on 16 February 1919, in Waynesboro, Virginia. He entered the United States Naval Reserve as Ensign on 31 December 1940. He reported for active duty 17 March 1941, under instruction at the Supply Corps, Naval Medical Center, Washington, D.C.. He reported to the 3rd Naval District 17 October 1941, for duty on board USS Atlanta upon its commissioning. After serving on the light cruiser during the Battle of Midway and Solomon Islands campaigns, he was promoted to Lieutenant (junior grade) on 1 October 1942. He was killed in action 13 November 1942, on board Atlanta, during the Naval Battle of Guadalcanal.

== Construction and commissioning ==
She was laid down 26 July 1943, by Consolidated Steel Corporation, Orange, Texas; launched 5 September 1943; sponsored by Mrs. Mae H. Koiner, the mother of Lt. (j.g.) Koiner; and commissioned 27 December 1943.

== World War II North Atlantic operations ==
After shakedown off Bermuda, Koiner cleared Charleston, South Carolina, 28 February 1944, to join a convoy at Willemstad, Curaçao, N.W.I., and escort tankers to Mediterranean ports. For the next six months, she remained on convoy-escort duty in the Atlantic, making four round trip cruises from Curaçao to North Africa and Naples, Italy. Completing her final Mediterranean cruise 31 August, Koiner commenced escort duty for United Kingdom-bound ships. From 20 September 1944 to 1 May 1945, the destroyer escort sailed with five convoys to British ports. On 11 February 1945, Koiner likely helped sink U-869. Upon cessation of hostilities in Europe she began preparations for Pacific duty.

== Transfer to the Pacific Fleet ==
Koiner arrived Pearl Harbor 25 June, commencing training operations with USS Corregidor (CVE-58) and exercises with submarines. Departing Pearl Harbor 4 August, she was en route to Leyte when President Harry S. Truman announced the end of hostilities with Japan.

== End-of-war activity ==
The destroyer escort remained in the Far East as part of the occupation forces on escort and patrol duty until 1 April 1946. Clearing Hong Kong, she sailed by way of the Indian Ocean and Mediterranean, and arrived Charleston, South Carolina, 30 May. Koiner was decommissioned and joined the Atlantic Reserve Fleet 4 October 1946 at Green Cove Springs, Florida.

== On loan to the Coast Guard ==
From 20 June 1951 to 14 May 1954, Koiner was on loan to the United States Coast Guard commissioned as WDE-431. She served as an ocean station vessel out of Seattle, Washington until her return to the Navy in 1954.

== Conversion to radar picket ship ==
She was converted to a radar picket escort vessel and reclassified DER-331 on 28 September 1954. Recommissioned 26 August 1955, Koiner joined the Continental Air Defense System in the Pacific Barrier. From 1956 into 1965, Koiner operated on picket stations off the Washington and California coast to provide early warning in the event of enemy air attack.

== Vietnam crisis operations ==
On 1 July 1965, Koiner departed Alameda, California, for her new home port, Guam, arriving 28 July after a stopover at Pearl Harbor. On 6 August, she left for the first of three Operation Market Time patrols ending in December.

Koiner operated in Vietnam territorial waters on the following dates: 8-Aug-65 thru 7-Sep-65, 22-Sep-65 thru 19-Oct-65, 5-Nov-65, 11-Nov-65 thru 1-Dec-65, 28-Feb-66 thru 29-Mar-66, 9-Apr-66 thru 10-May-66, 17-May-66 thru 19-May-66, 23-May-66 thru 9-Jul-66, 29-Jul-66 thru 25-Aug-66, 7-Sep-66 thru 25-Sep-66, 27-Jan-67 thru 4-Feb-67, 13-Feb-67 thru 10-Mar-67, 19-Mar-67 thru 18-Apr-67, 27-Apr-67 thru 14-May-67, 8-Jun-67 thru 1-Jul-67, 13-Feb-68 thru 8-Mar-68, 25-Apr-68 thru 31-May-68, 8-Jun-68 thru 22-Jun-68.

The experience Koiner had gained during her patrols off the West Coast enabled the radar picket escort ship to contribute greatly to the surveillance tactics necessary to prevent the flow of supplies by sea to the Viet Cong.

During 1966, Koiner was again deployed for further "Market Time" operations off Vietnam. A seven-month WestPac cruise began late in February. Between patrols, the ship visited Hong Kong; Bangkok; Manila; and Kaoshiung, Formosa.

In late January 1967, Koiner participated in a gunfire mission after a brief in-port period in Yokosuka, Japan. She then resumed her regular duties.

== Final decommissioning ==
Koiner was decommissioned and struck from the Navy List 23 September 1968. She was sold for scrapping 3 September 1969.
