= USS Howard D. Crow =

WWII US naval vessel

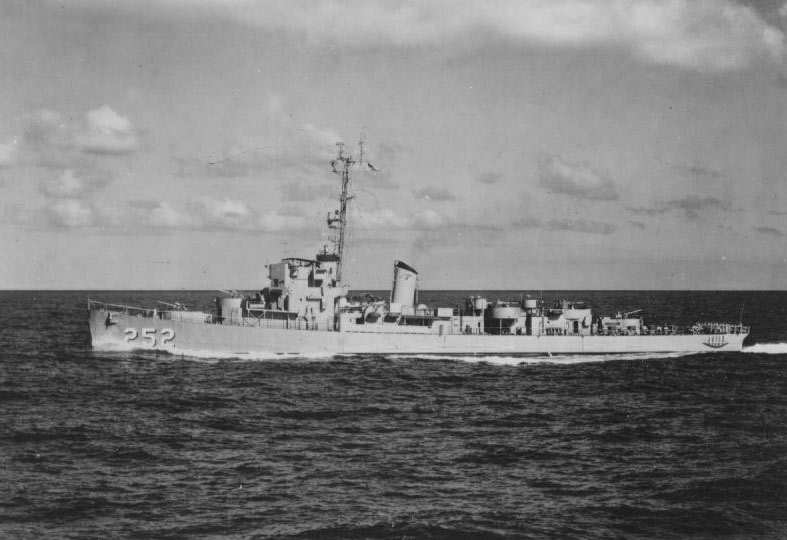

History

United States
- Namesake: Howard Daniel Crow
- Builder: Brown Shipbuilding Houston, Texas
- Laid down: 6 February 1943
- Launched: 26 April 1943
- Commissioned: 27 September 1943
- Decommissioned: 1 August 1962
- Stricken: 23 September 1968
- Fate: Sold for scrapping, October 1970

General characteristics
- Class & type: Edsall-class destroyer escort
- Displacement: 1,253 tons standard; 1,590 tons full load
- Length: 306 feet (93.27 m)
- Beam: 36.58 feet (11.15 m)
- Draft: 10.42 full load feet (3.18 m)
- Propulsion: 4 FM diesel engines, 4 diesel-generators, 6,000 shp (4.5 MW), 2 screws
- Speed: 21 knots (39 km/h)
- Range: 9,100 nmi. at 12 knots; (17,000 km at 22 km/h)
- Complement: 8 officers, 201 enlisted
- Armament: 3 × single 3 in (76 mm)/50 guns; 1 × twin 40 mm AA guns; 8 × single 20 mm AA guns; 1 × triple 21 in (533 mm) torpedo tubes; 8 × depth charge projectors; 1 × depth charge projector (hedgehog); 2 × depth charge tracks

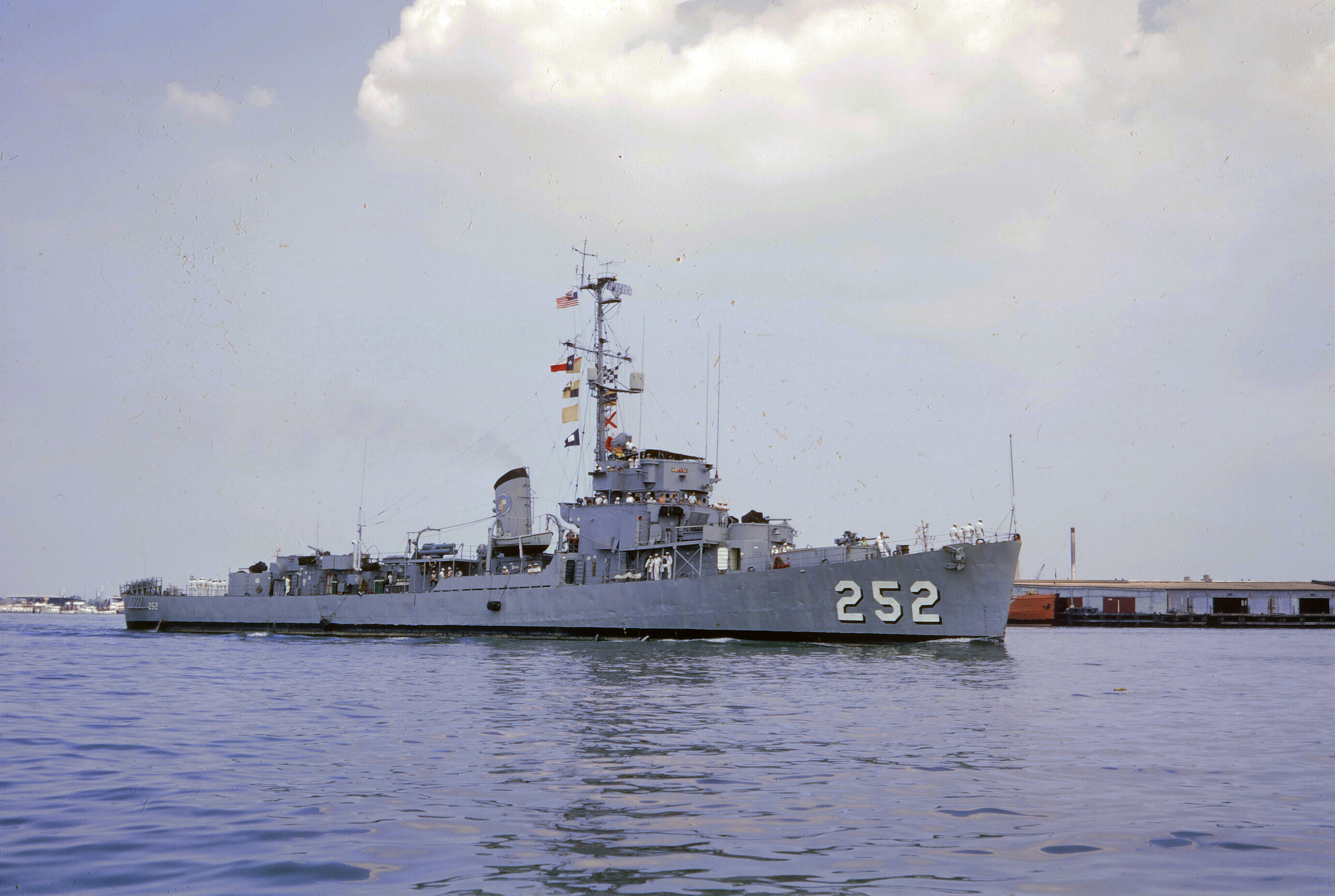

USS Howard D. Crow (DE-252) was an Edsall-class destroyer escort built for the U.S. Navy during World War II. She served in the Atlantic Ocean the Pacific Ocean and provided destroyer escort protection against submarine and air attack for Navy vessels and convoys.

== Namesake ==
Howard Daniel Crow was born on 2 February 1918 in Alvarado, Texas. he earned a Bachelor of Science degree from North Texas State Teachers College, Denton, Texas, in 1939, and enlisted in the United States Naval Reserve (USNR) as an apprentice seaman at Dallas, Texas on 29 August 1940. After training on the heavy cruiser USS Quincy from 28 October to 23 November 1940, he received his appointment as a midshipman, USNR, on 16 December 1940. He was commissioned Ensign after completing Naval Reserve Midshipman's School, Northwestern University on 14 March 1941. He reported to the battleship USS Maryland on 29 March. In the surprise Japanese Attack on Pearl Harbor on 7 December 1941, Maryland was moored inboard of USS Oklahoma and received two bomb hits, one of which killed Ensign Crow.

== Construction and commissioning ==
DE-252 was laid down on 6 February 1943 at Houston, Texas, by Brown Shipbuilding Co.; named Howard D. Crow (DE-252) on 23 February 1943; launched on 26 April 1943; sponsored by Miss Viola Elaine Warner, the late Ens. Crow's fiancée (who had been recommended by his parents for the honor of christening the ship); and commissioned at Houston, Texas, on 27 September 1943.

== World War II North Atlantic operations ==
Crewed by the U.S. Coast Guard, Howard D. Crow conducted shakedown training out of Bermuda during October and November, reporting to Norfolk, Virginia, for convoy duty 1 December. The destroyer escort sailed with her first convoy 15 December, saw it safely to Casablanca, and returned to New York 24 January 1944. In the months that followed, Howard D. Crow made 10 arduous escort voyages to British ports, protecting the supplies which sustained the great land offensive which was to end the war with Germany. On 11 February 1945 the Crow likely helped sink U-869.

== Transferred to the Pacific Fleet ==
The destroyer escort was berthed at New York when Germany surrendered 8 May 1945, and after extensive refresher training in the Caribbean, sailed from Guantánamo Bay for the Pacific War 2 July. Arriving Pearl Harbor via the Panama Canal 25 July, Howard D. Crow continued into the western Pacific for a tour of vital weather-reporting duty, so important to the operation of the great fleets. She sailed from Midway Island 13 December 1945, and after stopping at the Panama Canal and New York, arrived Green Cove Springs, Florida, 15 March 1946. She decommissioned 22 May 1946 and entered the Atlantic Reserve Fleet.

== Reclassified as training ship ==
With the Korean War came greater demands on the far-flung Navy, and Howard D. Crow recommissioned 6 July 1951 with a Navy crew. After shakedown training she reported to Key West, Florida, as Sonar School training ship, helping develop new equipment and tactics in antisubmarine warfare.

Moving north to Newport, Rhode Island, in 1952, the ship took part in fleet antisubmarine exercises off the coast. For the next 6 years Howard D. Crow followed this pattern of operations—antisubmarine training, exercises in the Atlantic and Caribbean, and periodic overhauls. In 1957, she took part in important NATO exercises with almost 50 ships from a dozen countries and in 1958 the versatile ship acted as communications ship during a successful Jupiter nose-cone recovery off Puerto Rico.

Howard D. Crow was assigned to Galveston, Texas, as reserve training ship in September 1958. In this capacity she conducted 2-week training cruises for reservists, and at the same time maintained the ship in a high state of readiness for any emergency. Her periodic training cruises took the escort vessel to Key West and the Caribbean. In August 1961, however, the Berlin situation worsened, and Howard D. Crow was one of several reserve training ships returned to active service to increase the nation's readiness. She conducted refresher training at Guantanamo Bay and operated with the fleet in the Atlantic and Caribbean until August 1962.

The ship returned to reserve training duty 1 August 1962, again based at Galveston. She continued through 1963 into 1967 to provide at-sea training for naval reservists so vital in keeping America's defenses at the highest possible level of training and skill.

== Final decommissioning ==
Stricken from the Navy Register on 23 September 1968, Howard D. Crow was sold in October 1970.
