= German submarine U-869 =

German World War II submarine

History

Nazi Germany
- Name: U-869
- Ordered: 25 August 1941
- Builder: Deutsche Schiff- und Maschinenbau AG Weser, Bremen
- Yard number: 1077
- Laid down: 5 April 1943
- Launched: 5 October 1943
- Commissioned: 26 January 1944
- Fate: Sunk on 11 February 1945

General characteristics
- Class & type: Type IXC/40 submarine
- Displacement: 1,144 t (1,126 long tons) surfaced; 1,257 t (1,237 long tons) submerged
- Length: 76.76 m (251 ft 10 in) o/a; 58.75 m (192 ft 9 in) pressure hull
- Beam: 6.86 m (22 ft 6 in) o/a; 4.44 m (14 ft 7 in) pressure hull
- Height: 9.60 m (31 ft 6 in)
- Draught: 4.67 m (15 ft 4 in)
- Installed power: 4,400 PS (3,200 kW; 4,300 bhp) (diesels); 1,000 PS (740 kW; 990 shp) (electric)
- Propulsion: 2 shafts; 2 × diesel engines; 2 × electric motors
- Speed: 18.3 knots (33.9 km/h; 21.1 mph) surfaced; 7.3 knots (13.5 km/h; 8.4 mph) submerged
- Range: 13,850 nmi (25,650 km; 15,940 mi) at 10 knots (19 km/h; 12 mph) surfaced; 63 nmi (117 km; 72 mi) at 4 knots (7.4 km/h; 4.6 mph) submerged
- Test depth: 230 m (750 ft)
- Complement: 4 officers, 44 enlisted
- Sensors & processing systems: FuMO-61 Hohentwiel U
- Armament: 6 × torpedo tubes (4 bow, 2 stern); 22 × 53.3 cm (21 in) torpedoes; 1 × 3.7 cm (1.5 in) Flak M42 AA gun; 2 x twin 2 cm (0.79 in) C/30 AA guns

Service record
- Part of: 4th U-boat Flotilla; 26 January – 30 November 1944; 33rd U-boat Flotilla; 1 December 1944 – 11 February 1945
- Identification codes: M 49 163
- Commanders: Kptlt. Hellmut Neuerburg; 26 January 1944 – 11 February 1945
- Operations: 1 patrol: 8 December 1944 – 11 February 1945
- Victories: None

German submarine U-869 was a Type IXC/40 U-boat of the German Navy (Kriegsmarine) during World War II; her keel was laid down 5 April 1943 by Deutsche Schiff- und Maschinenbau AG Weser of Bremen. It was commissioned on 26 January 1944 with Kapitänleutnant Hellmut Neuerburg in command. The German Kriegsmarine lost contact with the submarine on 11 February 1945, and it was long assumed she had been sunk in combat somewhere along (or near to) the Moroccan coastline with all hands lost. However, the wreck of U-869 was discovered off the coast of New Jersey in 1991.

== Design ==
German Type IXC/40 submarines were slightly larger than the original Type IXCs. U-869 had a displacement of 1,144 tonnes (1,126 long tons) when at the surface and 1,257 tonnes (1,237 long tons) while submerged. The U-boat had a total length of 76.76 m (251 ft 10 in), a pressure hull length of 58.75 m (192 ft 9 in), a beam of 6.86 m (22 ft 6 in), a height of 9.60 m (31 ft 6 in), and a draught of 4.67 m (15 ft 4 in). The submarine was powered by two MAN M 9 V 40/46 supercharged four-stroke, nine-cylinder diesel engines producing a total of 4,400 metric horsepower (3,240 kW; 4,340 shp) for use while surfaced, two Siemens-Schuckert 2 GU 345/34 double-acting electric motors producing a total of 1,000 shaft horsepower (1,010 PS; 750 kW) for use while submerged. She had two shafts and two 1.92 m (6 ft) propellers. The boat was capable of operating at depths of up to 230 metres (750 ft).

The submarine had a maximum surface speed of 18.3 knots (33.9 km/h; 21.1 mph) and a maximum submerged speed of 7.3 knots (13.5 km/h; 8.4 mph). When submerged, the boat could operate for 63 nautical miles (117 km; 72 mi) at 4 knots (7.4 km/h; 4.6 mph); when surfaced, she could travel 13,850 nautical miles (25,650 km; 15,940 mi) at 10 knots (19 km/h; 12 mph). U-869 was fitted with six 53.3 cm (21 in) torpedo tubes (four fitted at the bow and two at the stern), 22 torpedoes, and a 3.7 cm (1.5 in) Flak M42 as well as two twin 2 cm (0.79 in) C/30 anti-aircraft guns. The boat had a complement of 48.

== Service history ==
U-869 conducted one World War II war patrol without success. It suffered no casualties to her crew until it was lost on 11 February 1945, with all but one of 56 crew members dead. The surviving crew member, Herbert Guschewski, was not on board, falling ill before the patrol. Robert Kurson chronicled the story of U-869's finding in the book Shadow Divers (2004).

=== Engagement near Morocco ===
On 28 February 1945, the American destroyer escort USS Fowler and the French submarine chaser L'Indiscret conducted a depth charge attack on a submerged contact in the Atlantic, near Rabat, and reported a kill, although little visible evidence was presented to confirm the kill. Based on the information provided, U.S. Naval Intelligence rated the attacks "G—No Damage". U-869 had been previously ordered by Karl Dönitz to move her area of operations from the North American coast to the Gibraltar area. Postwar investigators upgraded the rating from "G—No Damage" to "B—Probably Sunk", leading to an erroneous historical record that U-869 was sunk near Gibraltar. For many years this attack was assumed to have been her end.

=== Discovery off U.S. coast ===
In 1991, Bill Nagle, a former wreck diver and the captain of Seeker, learned about a wreck off New Jersey and decided to mount a diving expedition to the site. On 2 September 1991, an unidentified U-boat wreck was discovered 73 meters (240 feet) deep (a hazardous depth for standard scuba diving) off the coast of New Jersey. Nicknamed U-Who, the exact identity of the wreck was a matter of frequent debate, and initially the wreck was thought to be either U-550 or U-521. The discoverers of U-Who, John Chatterton, Richie Kohler, and Kevin Brennan, continued to dive the wreck for the next several years. (Three divers, Steve Feldman, Chris Rouse and "Chrissy" Rouse, died exploring U-869.) Eventually, the team recovered a knife inscribed with "Horenburg", a crew member's name. However, they learned at the U-boat archives that U-869 was supposedly sent to Africa, so this piece of evidence was initially disregarded. A few years later, they found part of the UZO torpedo aiming device, and a spare parts box from the motor room engraved with serial and other identifying numbers. On 31 August 1997 they concluded that the boat they found was U-869.

The location of the wreck is approximately 39°32′56″N 73°19′56″W.

=== Cause of sinking ===
The men who found U-869 believed it was a victim of her own torpedo, which may have become a "circle-runner". Torpedoes manufactured later in the war had acoustical seeking capability. It was theorized that the torpedo was initially fired in a turning pattern and when it missed her target, it picked up the sound of the submarine's propeller. At least two other German U-boats supposedly have been lost due to their own torpedoes: U-377 in 1944 and U-972 in late 1943. Chatterton and Kohler based their theory largely on a lack of evidence to support other causes for sinking. They claimed there was no reported naval activity in the vicinity, thereby ruling out a sinking by attack. Moreover, the damage to the hull was from the outside and thereby ruled out an internal explosion. This problem also affected the US submarine force at least twice, as seen with USS Tang and USS Tullibee.

Gary Gentile, a noted wreck diver, researcher, and author, rejects Chatteron and Kohler's theory. He cites attack logs and eyewitness accounts from the crew of two destroyer escorts suggesting that the U-boat was initially damaged with a hedgehog launched by the USS Howard D. Crow and then subsequently damaged with a depth charge by the accompanying USS Koiner.

The United States Coast Guard, in its official evaluation, rejected the circle-running torpedo theory and awarded the sinking to the two destroyers. This was confirmed by Marlyn Berkey, who was on a destroyer as part of the Pacific fleet entering New York Harbor after the war's end; the submarine showed up on sonar, Berkey's destroyer depth charged the sub, it sank as evidenced by oil and debris that floated on the surface; the destroyer's crew was allowed to place a broom upside down atop the mainmast coming into New York, which meant "clean sweep". Contributing to their findings are two damage holes in the wreck of U-869, which are more consistent with the attack reports that cited two explosions than with the circle runner theory which would only explain one hole. The official records state that U-869 was destroyed on 11 February 1945 by two U.S. destroyer escorts, Howard D. Crow and Koiner. John Chatterton, one of the divers who discovered U-869 in 1991, states in Wreck Diving Magazine his belief that the two U.S. destroyer escorts attacked the wreck of U-869 after the U-boat had been struck by her own torpedo.

=== Survival of crew member ===
One crew member survived by virtue of not having been aboard. Second Radio Officer Herbert Guschewski came down with pneumonia and pleurisy shortly before the boat's departure. Like others, Guschewski did not learn what happened to the crew until 1999. He watched a program which eventually became the PBS NOVA episode "Hitler's Lost Sub" and contacted the producers shortly afterward, who interviewed him and placed a portion of it in the 2000 American broadcast.

== Bibliography ==
- Busch, Rainer; Röll, Hans-Joachim (1999). German U-boat commanders of World War II : a biographical dictionary. Translated by Brooks, Geoffrey. London, Annapolis, Md: Greenhill Books, Naval Institute Press. ISBN 1-55750-186-6.
- Busch, Rainer; Röll, Hans-Joachim (1999). Der U-Boot-Krieg, 1939-1945: Deutsche U-Boot-Verluste von September 1939 bis Mai 1945 [German U-boat losses from September 1939 to May 1945] (in German). Vol. IV. Hamburg, Berlin, Bonn: Mittler. ISBN 3-8132-0514-2.
- Chowdhury, Bernie Chowdhury (2002). The Last Dive: A Father and Son's Fatal Descent into the Ocean's Depths. Harper Paperbacks. p. 384. ISBN 0-06-093259-7.
- Gentile, Gary (2006). Shadow Divers Exposed. Bellerophon Bookworks. ISBN 978-1-883056-24-7.
- Gröner, Eric; Jung, Dieter; Maass, Martin (1991). German Warships 1815-1945: U-boats and Mine Warfare Vessels. Vol. 2. Translated by Thomas, Keith; Magowan, Rachel. London: Conway Maritime Press. ISBN 0-85177-593-4.
- Kurson, Robert (2004). Shadow Divers. ISBN 0-375-50858-9.
