= John Chatterton =

American wreck diver (born 1951)

- Born: 1951 (age 74–75)

John Chatterton (born 1951) is an American wreck diver. Together with Richie Kohler, he was one of the co-hosts for the History Channel’s Deep Sea Detectives, for 57 episodes of the series. He is also a consultant to the film and television industries and has worked with 20th Century Fox, Paramount Pictures, and CBS.

Before his career in television, Chatterton spent twenty years working as a commercial diver in and around New York City. His first co-host and diving partner from Deep Sea Detectives, Michael Norwood, died in a diving accident during an expedition to Palau in December 2003.

== Career ==
The 1991 discovery and subsequent identification of the German submarine U-869, off the coast of New Jersey, has been the subject of several television documentaries including Hitler’s Lost Sub, a two-hour special for the popular Nova series on PBS. The same story was the subject of a book by Robert Kurson called Shadow Divers. The movie rights have been purchased by 20th Century Fox.

Chatterton was a member of the first technical diving expedition to Ireland and RMS Lusitania, in 1994. A few years later, at a depth of 400 feet (120 m), he was the first diver to use rebreather diving technology on the wreck of HMHS Britannic, near the island of Kea in Greece. In 2006, Chatterton re-visited the wreck of Britannic in the History Channel documentary Titanic's Tragic Sister, to try to find out what sank the third Olympic-class ocean liner. He was also the sole American on a British expedition, sponsored by the United States Holocaust Memorial Museum, seeking the historic shipwreck MV Struma in the Black Sea off Istanbul. These dives in Turkey were chronicled on the HBO documentary Struma. In addition, Chatterton has managed to make over 160 dives to the wreck of the SS Andrea Doria.

In August 2005, Chatterton and his partners put together an expedition to the wreck of RMS Titanic. They dived the wreck to a depth of approximately 12,500 feet (3,800 m) in the MIR submersible from the Russian research ship Akademik Mstislav Keldysh. Their exploration was featured on the History Channel special, Titanic's Final Moments – Missing Pieces. For the first time Chatterton and Kohler were both in front of, and behind the camera, and produced the program with Kirk Wolfinger.

In 2008, Chatterton and his partner John Mattera discovered and identified the wreck of the Golden Fleece off the north coast of the Dominican Republic. The ship was that of Joseph Bannister, a pirate captain of the late 17th century. The discovery of the Golden Fleece was chronicled by Robert Kurson in his 2015 book Pirate Hunters.

In the fall of 2015, Chatterton was featured on the TV series The Curse of Oak Island in an exploratory dive to the bottom of Borehole 10-x, a borehole with a depth of more than 200 feet.

== Military service ==
In 1970–71, John Chatterton served one twelve-month tour of duty in the Vietnam War as a combat medic in the 4th Battalion, 31st Infantry Regiment, 23rd Infantry Division (Americal Division).

== Other ==
In November 2000, John Chatterton was diagnosed with metastasized squamous cell carcinoma of the tonsil, which was thought to be likely a result of his exposure to Agent Orange in Vietnam. By May 2003, after he underwent chemotherapy, the cancer was in remission.

Chatterton is a member of the board of directors for Nanologix Inc., a biotech firm located in Hubbard, Ohio.

== Sources ==
- Robert Kurson, Shadow Divers (2004) ISBN 0-345-48247-6
- Gilliam, Bret C (2007). Diving Pioneers and Innovators. New World Publications. ISBN 1-878348-42-6.
- Robert Kurson "Pirate Hunters" 2015 ISBN 978-1-4000-6336-9
