= Richie Kohler =

American technical diver and shipwreck historian

Richie Kohler

Richie Kohler is an American technical wreck diver and shipwreck historian who has been diving and exploring shipwrecks since 1980. Together with John Chatterton, Kohler was one of the co-hosts of the television series Deep Sea Detectives on the History Channel and is also a consultant for the film and television industry on shipwreck and diving projects.

Kohler has explored shipwrecks around the world, including the SS Andrea Doria and the RMS Titanic. Diving from the Russian research vessel Keldysh, Kohler made multiple dives to 3,786 meters (12,421 ft) in the MIR submersibles to explore the Titanic's wreck site.

Kohler's work identifying a World War II German submarine, U-869, off the coast of New Jersey has been the subject of several television documentaries and a book by Robert Kurson, Shadow Divers.

== Exploration ==
Kohler was part of a team led by oceanographer Robert Ballard which explored and mapped the wreck of the U-166 in the summer of 2014 with remotely operated vehicles and determined that the bow of the submarine was destroyed, apparently by a depth charge which caused an internal explosion of the submarine's own torpedoes.
