= Wreck diving =

Recreational diving on wrecks

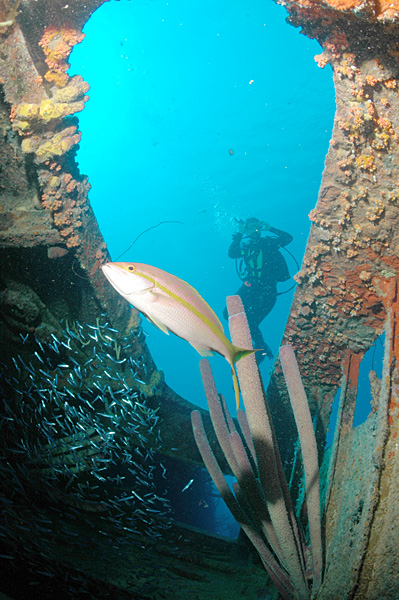
Diver at the wreck of the Hilma Hooker, Netherlands Antilles.

Wreck diving is recreational diving where the wreckage of ships, aircraft and other artificial structures are explored. The term is used mainly by recreational and technical divers. Professional divers, when diving on a shipwreck, generally refer to the specific task, such as salvage work, accident investigation or archaeological survey. Although most wreck dive sites are at shipwrecks, there is an increasing trend to scuttle retired ships to create artificial reef sites. Diving to crashed aircraft can also be considered wreck diving. The recreation of wreck diving makes no distinction as to how the vessel ended up on the bottom.

Some wreck diving involves penetration of the wreckage, making a direct ascent to the surface impossible for a part of the dive.

== Environment ==
The environment of wreck diving is sunken shipwrecks and other vehicles and structures, either sunk by misfortune, acts of war, or intentionally, as targets in military exercises, to serve as artificial reefs, or as recreational dive sites for the diving tourism industry. Wrecks sunk as tourist dive sites are usually cleaned up and have many hazards removed before scuttling, and are usually sunk in a place where the other natural hazards are not too serious. Wrecks sunk through misadventure tend to be in places with a wider range of environmental hazards, in many cases contributing to the wrecking event. In many cases the wreck itself presents a range of hazards, such as entanglement, sharp edged metal plating, disorienting interiors, unstable structure and loose silt deposits.

== Reasons for diving wrecks ==
A shipwreck may be attractive to divers for several reasons:

- it serves as an artificial reef, which creates a habitat for many types of marine life
- it often is a large structure with many interesting parts and machinery, which is not normally accessible to casual observers on working, floating vessels
- it often has an interesting history
- it presents new skill challenges for scuba divers to manage the risks associated with wreck penetration.
- it is part of the underwater cultural heritage and may be an important archaeological resource
- it provides a first-hand insight into context for the loss, such as causal connections, geographical associations, trade patterns and many other areas, providing a microcosm of our maritime heritage and maritime history
- it may contain artifacts of historical, artistic and/or monetary value, which can be recovered for profit (treasure hunting) or collection purposes (ranging from rare collector's items to souvenirs, memorabilia or other "trophies", such as crew members' or passengers' personal belongings, nautical instruments, brass portholes or silverware, cutlery, intact china or other tableware).

== Types of wreck diving ==
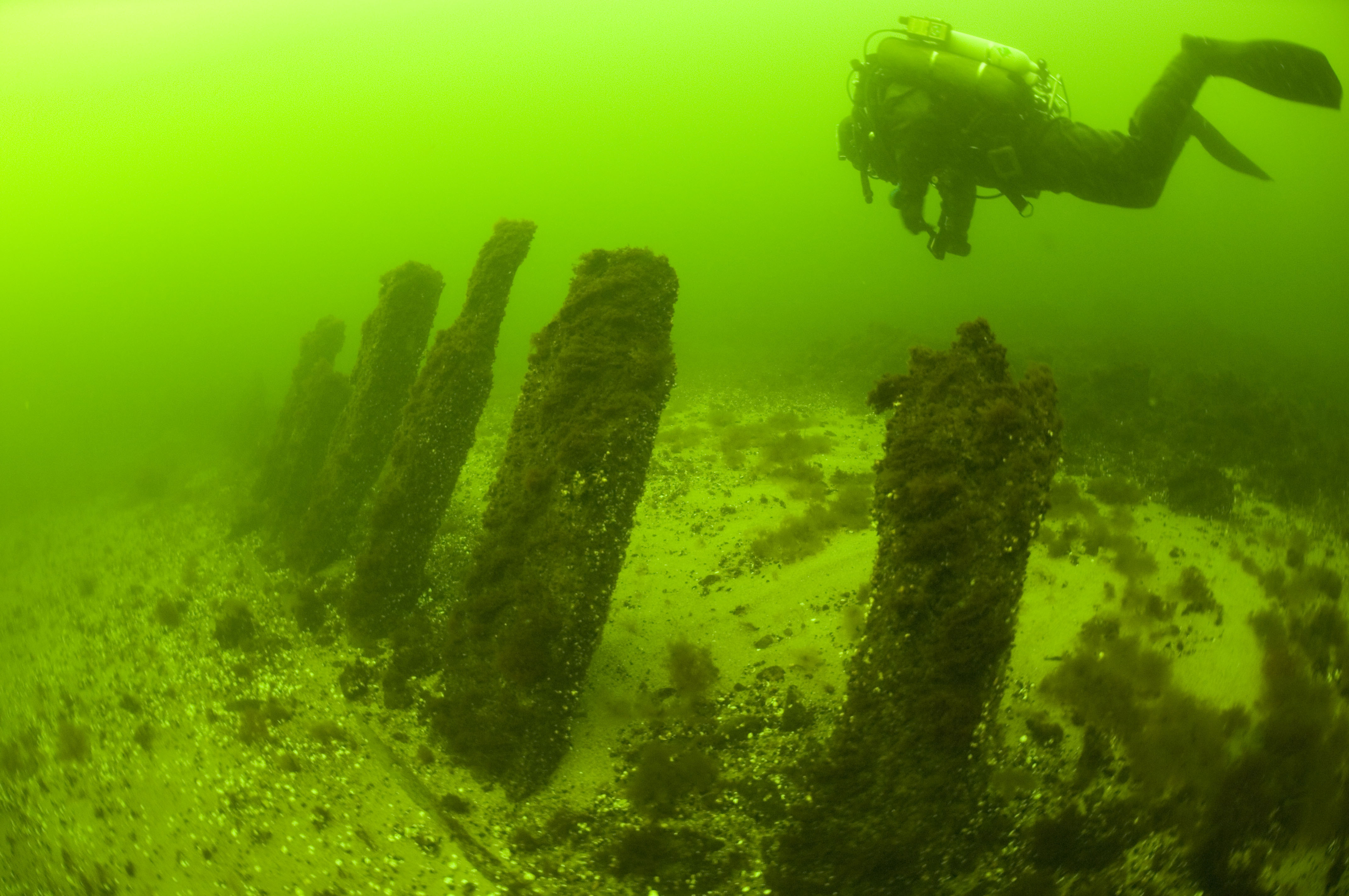
Wreck diving in Estonia for archaeological research.

In The Advanced Wreck Diving Handbook, Gary Gentile sub-divides wreck diving into three categories:

- Non-penetration diving (i.e. swimming outside the wreck)
- Limited penetration diving, within the "light zone", the parts of the interior of the wreck from which light entering the wreck from an exit can be seen. There may be parts of the interior illuminated by exterior light penetrating though holes too small to exit through, and these are not generally considered part of the light zone, as they cannot be used as an escape route. Limited penetration limits penetration to where the diver can see the way out.
- Full penetration diving, beyond the "light zone"

Each subsequent level involves additional hazards and greater risk, and therefore will normally require additional learning and experience to develop the required competence, and may also require additional equipment and the competence to use it effectively.

Non-penetration wreck diving is the least hazardous form of wreck diving, although divers still need to be aware of the entanglement risks presented by fishing nets and fishing lines which may be snagged to the wreck (wrecks are often popular fishing sites), and the underlying terrain may present greater risk of sharp edges.

Penetration within the light zone presents greater hazards due to overhead and greater proximity of the wreck's structure, but because of the proximity of a visible exit point, and some amount of external light, those hazards are more manageable. However, there is clearly a much greater risk of entanglement and silt out inside of the structure, as well as the requirement to move laterally to a defined exit point before one can surface in the event of an emergency.

Full penetration involves the greatest level of risks, including the risk of getting lost within the structure, the risk of complete darkness in the event of multiple light failures, and the inability to escape unassisted in the event of a complete disruption to breathing gas supply.

These categorisations broadly coincide with the traditional division between "recreational" wreck diving (taught as a specialty course by recreational diver training agencies and normally limited to the "light zone" and/or 100-130 cumulative feet of depth plus penetration) and "technical" wreck diving (taught as a stand-alone course by technical diver training agencies).

== Procedures and safety ==
Wrecks may present a variety of site-specific hazards to divers. Wrecks are often fouled by fishing lines or nets and the structure may be fragile and break without notice. Penetration diving, where the diver enters a shipwreck, is an activity exposing the diver to hazards of getting lost, entrapment and consequently running out of breathing gas. Management of these risks requires special skills and equipment. Many attractive or well preserved wrecks are in deeper water requiring deep diving precautions. Training agencies recommend that at least one cutting device be carried in case the diver is entangled with fishing lines, nets or ropes and to have a spare light source in case the primary light fails. If penetrating a wreck, a guideline tied off before entering a wreck and run out inside the wreck is required by training agencies. A guideline can help a diver to find the way out more easily in case of low visibility, and has often been necessary for survival. For penetration diving, a reserve of breathing gas sufficient to allow the diver to exit the wreck and make a safe ascent in the event of any reasonably foreseeable single failure of equipment is required by training agencies' protocols and scientific codes of practice. Many wreck divers use a minimum of the rule-of-thirds for gas management. This allows for 1/3 of the gas down and into the wreck, 1/3 for exit and ascent and 1/3 reserve. In dives where decompression stops are required, this may not be sufficient. In addition, because of the potential fragility of the wreck, the likelihood of disturbing sediments or disturbing the many marine animals that take advantage of the artificial habitat offered by the wreck, extra care is required when moving and finning. Many divers are taught to use alternative finning methods such as frog kick or modified flutter kick which direct the thrust of the fins away from the bottom where most of the silt is likely to deposit. Good buoyancy control is necessary for safe and non-destructive diving in the environment of a wreck.

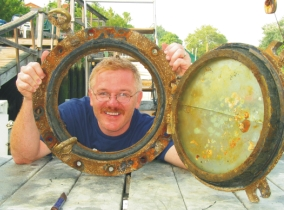
Diver with porthole recovered from a shipwreck in New York's Wreck Alley

=== Connecting to the wreck ===
There are several methods for getting the divers to the wreck. The preferred method will depend on local conditions. In low visibility, hooking onto the wreck is a reliable way of ensuring the divers will find it, but this procedure requires a wreck that is structurally suitable for snagging with a grapnel or anchor. A shotline which can be dropped off the wreckage is less likely to damage the wreck or become snagged and difficult to retrieve, but this requires appropriate visibility for the divers to be sure of finding the wreckage. When it is important to get back to the shotline for ascent, it may be tied to the wreckage by the first divers on site using a guide-line, which is retrieved by the last divers to leave. When there is a strong current, it may be necessary to drop in from up-current, a technique sometimes known as "parachuting in" or "free drop". The wreck may be first marked with a shotline, if this is considered useful or necessary. Divers may surface on the shotline, anchorline or personal decompression buoy depending on the conditions.

When using the anchor line to control ascents and descents, a "tag line" may be used between the anchor line and the stern of the vessel, to allow secure transfer between these points in a current. When live-boating there are alternative methods for descent, including free drop and descent on the shotline.

=== Penetration navigation ===
In technical penetration diving, there are broadly two approaches.

==== Use of guidelines ====
The conventional approach involves the use of continuous guidelines laid from a wreck reel, tied just outside the entrance point, just inside the entrance point, and at intervals inside (to mitigate the risk of a cut line, or a "line trap"). In deeper penetrations, two reels are used, so that in the event of a total loss of visibility where the diver loses contact with the primary line or the primary line gets cut, the secondary line can be anchored and then used as a reference point to sweep for the primary line. Procedures and techniques for navigation inside the wreck using a guide line are very much the same as in cave penetration.

==== Progressive penetration ====
An alternative approach, popularised to a limited extent by deep wreck divers in the American Northeast, is referred to as "progressive penetration". Progressive penetration eschews the use of guidelines, but the diver makes several successive penetrations, each deeper than the last, memorising the layout for both the inward and outward journeys. The method is vulnerable to complete loss of visibility in a silt-out, and any disorientation in an unfamiliar area or due to nitrogen narcosis. It relies on accurate recall where an error can be fatal, and where a more reliable option is easily and affordably available. As a navigational technique, progressive penetration is generally considered unsafe. As a surveying technique it tends to be inaccurate unless measurements are also recorded. It is not taught by any of the mainstream recreational diver training agencies.

Divers engaging in penetration diving are conventionally taught to carry three lights - a primary light and two backup lights - thereby virtually eliminating the risk of completely losing light inside the wreck. Nonetheless, total loss of visibility due to a silt-out remains a risk.

=== Deep wreck diving ===
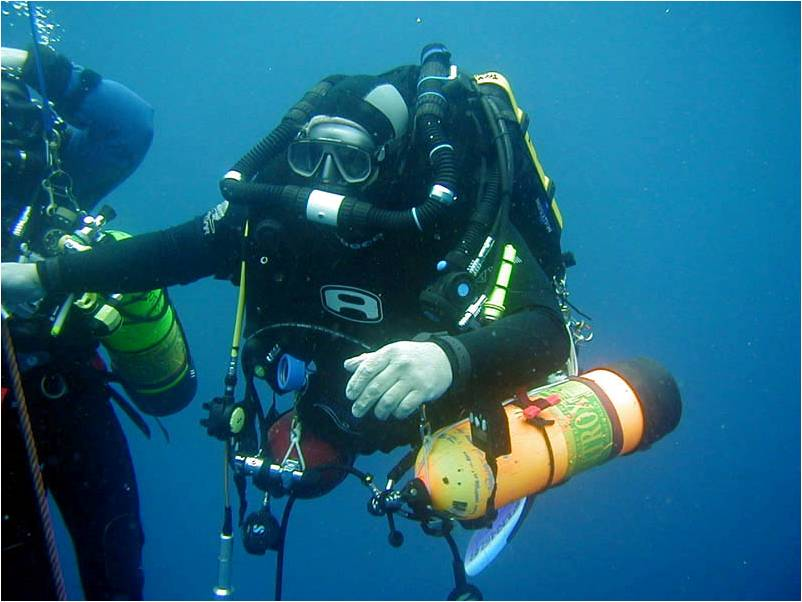
Diver returning from a 600 feet (180 m) wreck dive

Wrecks in shallower waters tend to deteriorate faster than wrecks in deeper water due to higher biological activity. Accordingly, many of the older and larger shipwrecks that tend to offer full penetration dives tend to be deeper dives. This can present additional complications; if a wreck dive is intended to be a decompression dive, then the diver will normally carry decompression gases in side-mounted cylinders. However, it is difficult to penetrate many wrecks with both back-mounted and side-mounted cylinders, requiring divers to either use a different configuration, or leave their decompression gases outside the wreck prior to penetration. This creates the possibility of a diver being unable to relocate their decompression gases if they exit the wreck at a different point from which they enter it. Furthermore, regulations have been implemented in prevention of fatal dives that restricts deep-sea wreck diving only towards experienced diving, such as the Britannic for instance.

=== Training ===
Because of the increasing popularity and higher risk of wreck diving, many diver training organizations such as Scuba Diving International and the Professional Association of Diving Instructors provide specialist wreck diver training courses, which divers are advised to take before wreck diving. Such courses typically teach skills such as air management and the proper use of guidelines and reels. Most recreational diving organizations teach divers only to penetrate to, at most, the limit of the "light zone" or a maximum aggregate surface distance (depth and penetration) of 100 feet. Other technical diving organizations, such as IANTD, TDI and ANDI teach advanced wreck courses that require more extensive training and competence and more safety equipment, and prepare divers for levels of wreck penetration beyond the areas illuminated by ambient light. The Nautical Archaeology Society in the UK teaches awareness of underwater cultural heritage issues as well as practical diver and archaeological skills. In this context, some research projects are investigating the potentialities offered by digital technologies to adopt virtual replicas of the underwater wrecksite for training purposes. Other organizations, such as the Artificial Reef Society of British Columbia (ARSBC) deliberately create artificial reefs to provide features for divers to explore, as well as substrates for marine life to thrive upon.

== Special equipment ==
As long as there is no penetration of the wreck, no special wreck diving equipment is required, and equipment is based on the situation outside the wreck. For example, if the wreck is at a depth that is classified as technical deep diving, then the basic equipment requirement will be based on that.

In the limited penetration diving zone, at least one diving reel and one primary light are recommended in addition to the basic equipment for the outside environment. Additional breathing gas for the rule of thirds in an overhead environment increases the required cylinder size. Sufficient emergency gas must be available to reach the surface for any reasonably foreseeable emergency. This may be in the form of buddy or team supplied reserve gas or as a bailout cylinder carried by the diver

For full penetration diving, additional safety equipment is necessary. This is similar to equipment used in cave diving, but more cut-resistant line may be used. Most of this equipment is to reduce the risk of getting lost or trapped inside the wreckage. The most important components are lights and guide lines. Lights include a primary light, a secondary light and a positioning light. Line may be carried on, and deployed from, a primary reel, a safety reel, and a jump/gap reel. A redundant emergency gas supply is necessary. Depending on the dive plan, double cylinders are standard, even when stage cylinders are also carried. A cave diving helmet is useful protection for the head, and gloves protect against sharp metal edges. Equipment should be stowed compactly, to reduce the risk of snagging on wreckage and being damaged or trapping the diver. Rubber bands and metal or plastic clips are used to secure loose or dangling equipment.

== Impact of recreational scuba diving on wrecks ==
The impact of recreational scuba diving on recreational dive values and the cultural heritage of shipwrecks has been found to comprise four basic types:

- The removal of artifacts and associated disturbance to wreck sites,
- Direct contact with wrecks and the benthic biota living on them by divers and their equipment,
- Exhaled air bubbles trapped inside the wreckage,
- Impact damage by anchors of dive boats, considered by some researchers to be the most damaging form of impact associated with recreational wreck diving.

== Protection of wrecks ==
In many countries, wrecks are legally protected from unauthorized salvage or desecration.

In the United Kingdom, three Acts protect wrecks:

- Protection of Wrecks Act 1973: certain designated, charted, historic or dangerous sites may not be dived without a license
- Protection of Military Remains Act 1986: all military aircraft and 16 designated ships are considered war graves that can only be dived with a license. Other non-designated ships may be dived providing the divers do not enter, disturb or remove artifacts
- Merchant Shipping Act 1995: all wrecks and cargoes are owned: each artifact removed must be reported to the Receiver of Wreck

Wrecks that are protected are denoted as such on nautical charts (such as admiralty charts); any diving restrictions should be adhered to. Historic wrecks (often but not always defined as being more than 50 years of age) are often protected from pillaging and looting through national laws protecting cultural heritage. Internationally they may be protected by a State ratifying the Unesco Convention on the Protection of the Underwater Cultural Heritage. In this case pillaging is not allowed. One such example is the Queen Anne's Revenge which is undergoing archaeological recovery by the North Carolina Department of Natural and Cultural Resources (NC DNCR) near Beaufort Inlet, NC.

In 2003 the Greek Ministry of Culture, issued a Ministerial Order classifying "any wreck of ship or aeroplane, sunk for longer than 50 years from the present" as Cultural Assets / Monuments, with a protection zone of 300 meters around them. Terms and conditions for visiting any monument in Greece are set by the Ministry of Culture.

In South African waters, the wrecks of ships or aircraft, and any associated cargo, debris or artifact more than 60 years old and are protected by the National Heritage Resources Act number 25 of 1999 (NHRA). The law of salvage and finds does not apply to historical shipwrecks, which are considered by the NHRA to be archaeological material, and as such are the property of the state, administered by SAHRA in trust for the nation, and may not be disturbed in any way except under the terms of a permit issued by the South African Heritage Resources Agency (SAHRA). There are severe penalties for contravening the Act, including heavy fines and jail terms. All members of the South African Police Services, and Customs and Excise officers may act as Heritage Inspectors in terms of the Act, with powers of search, confiscation and arrest. Historical wrecks may be visited provided that the sites are not disturbed or interfered with and no artifacts are removed or damaged.

== Wreck diving sites ==
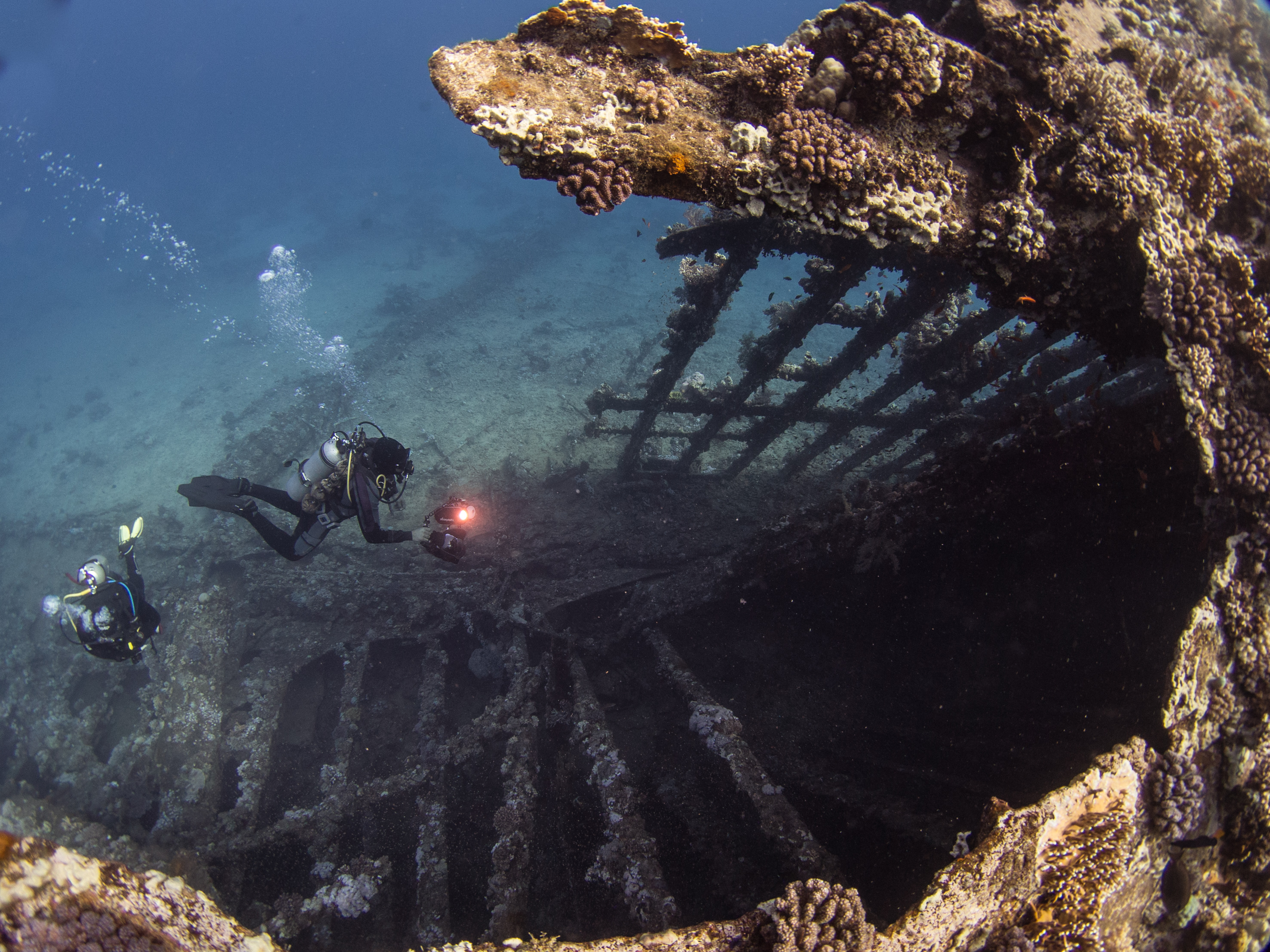
Divers at the wreck of the SS Carnatic

There are thousands of popular wreck diving sites throughout the world. Some of these are artificial wrecks or sunk deliberately to attract divers (such as USS Spiegel Grove and USS Oriskany in Florida, MV Bianca C. in Grenada, and the wrecks of Recife in Pernambuco/Brazil which include artificial and disaster wrecks). Diver trails, also called wreck trails, can be used to allow scuba-divers to visit and understand archaeological sites that are suitable for scuba-diving. One excellent example is the Florida Public Archaeology Network's (FPAN) "Florida Panhandle Shipwreck Trail."

Along the Outer Banks, navigational challenges posed by the Diamond Shoals area off Cape Hatteras, caused the loss of thousands of ships and an unknown number of human lives. More than 5000 ships have sunk in these waters since record keeping began in 1526. Among the better known shipwrecks was USS Monitor, a participant in the Battle of Hampton Roads during the American Civil War. Monitor foundered on 31 December 1862 off Cape Hatteras. During World War II German U-boats would lie offshore and silhouette passing freighters and tankers against the lights onshore. Dozens of ships along the North Carolina coast were torpedoed in this fashion by German submarines in what became known as Torpedo Alley. Popular wrecks include the German submarine U-352, USS Monitor, USS Schurz (SMS Geier), USS Tarpon, USS Yancey, USS Indra, USS Aeolus and USCGC Spar.

Others are wrecks of vessels lost in disasters (such as RMS Rhone in the British Virgin Islands, Zenobia in Cyprus and the many shipwrecks off the Isles of Scilly in England). In the Marlborough Sounds, New Zealand, the wreck of MS Mikhail Lermontov, a 177-metre (581 ft) cruise liner which was lost in 1986, is a popular dive site. Lying at 37 metres (121 ft) underwater, the wreck is suitable for recreational and technical divers.

More unusual are wrecks of structures, such as the wreck of the old cruise ship pier in Saint Croix, U.S. Virgin Islands, destroyed by Hurricane Hugo in 1989. As part of the recovery and replacement of the Frederiksted Pier, the old pier was to be removed and sunk far out at sea in 3,600-metre (11,800 ft) deep waters. Much of the old pier was used to create an artificial reef. Several barges carried the wreckage three kilometres (1.9 mi) down the beach, and dumped the wreckage of steel girders, vehicles, concrete tubes, pylons, and pavement into 33-metre (108 ft) deep waters to create a dive site now known as Armageddon.

A number of wreck diving sites are ships lost to wartime hostilities, such as SS Thistlegorm in the Red Sea, the wrecks of Subic Bay and Coron in the Philippines, SS President Coolidge in Vanuatu and the "ghost fleet" of Truk Lagoon. In the Andaman Islands, the Inket Wreck, where a Japanese ship sank during World War II is a dive site near Duncan Island.

Some regions are particularly noted for the number and quality of wreck dive sites, such as Truk Lagoon in Micronesia, Scapa Flow in Orkney Islands, Scotland, the Outer Banks of North Carolina, known as the "Graveyard of the Atlantic", and the Great Lakes.

For technical divers there are a few wrecks that have attracted widespread popularity. For years SS Andrea Doria was regarded as the pinnacle of challenges to the wreck diver, but, since the popularisation of trimix as a breathing gas, technical divers now dive deeper and more challenging wrecks, and Andrea Doria is now considered by some to be a good training wreck for trimix divers.

== History ==
- Connections with marine salvage and underwater archaeology

== See also ==
- Archaeology of shipwrecks – Study of human activity through the analysis of shipwreck artifacts
- Aviation archaeology – Finding, documenting, recovering, and preserving sites important in aviation history
- Cave diving – Diving in water-filled caves
- Diver training – Processes to develop the skills and knowledge to dive safely underwater
- Lists of shipwrecks
- Maritime archaeology – Archaeological study of human interaction with the sea
- Michigan Underwater Preserves – Protected areas of the Great Lakes on Michigan's coast
- Nautical Archaeology Society – British organisation to further research in nautical archaeology for the public benefit
- Marine salvage – Recovering a ship or cargo after a maritime casualty
- Salvage diving – Diving work associated with the recovery of vehicles, cargo and structures
- Scuba diving – Swimming underwater, breathing gas carried by the diver
- Scuba diving tourism – Industry based on recreational diver travel
- Shipwreck – Physical remains of a beached or sunk ship
- Sinking ships for wreck diving sites – Scuttling old ships to produce artificial reefs
- Underwater archaeology – Study of human activity via evidence found underwater
