= June 8 =

June 8 this year in various calendars
- Monday, 8 June 2026
Akan	Kwadwo
Armenian	23 Margach 1475
Aztec	Teotleco 9, 7 Ōlīn
Babylonian	21 Ayaru, 2337 SE
Balinese pawukon	Luang, Pepet, Beteng, Sri, Umanis, Was, Coma of Sungsang, Sri, Tulus, Raksasa
Bengali	25 Joishtho, BS 1433
Chinese	Yin Water Ox・Roof Mansion; Fire Horse Year, Month 4, Day 23 (Mangzhong, 13 days until Xiazhi)
Common Era	8 June 2026 CE
Coptic	1 Paoni, AM 1742
Egyptian	23 Phaophi, 2775 NE
Ethiopian	1 Sanē, 2018 Amätä Məhrät
French Republican	Décade II, Décadi de Prairial de l'Année 234 de la République
Gregorian	8 June, AD 2026
Hebrew	23 Sivan, AM 5786
Hindu	Pūrvabhādrapada・Viṣkambha; Solar: 25 Jyeṣṭha, 1948 SE; Lunisolar: Aṣṭamī, Kṛishna pakṣa of Adhika Jyeṣṭha, 2083 VE; Rāudra・5127 KY・1,872,734
Icelandic	Mánudagur, 17 Skerpla 2026
Islamic	22 Dhu al-Hijjah, AH 1447 (using tabular method)
ISO week date	2026-W24-1
Japanese	23 Uzuki, Reiwa 8 (Bōshu, 13 days until Geshi)
Julian	26 May, AD 2026 (AM 7534)
Julian day	2461200
Korean	23 Baemdal, 4359 DE
Maya	13.0.13.11.17; 10 Zotz, 7 Caban
Roman	ante diem VII Kalendas Iunias, MMDCCLXXIX AUC
Solar Hijri	18 Khordad, SH 1405
Tibetan	23 sa ga, me pho rta 2153 or 1772 or 1000

<<	June					>>
Su	Mo	Tu	We	Th	Fr	Sa
	1	2	3	4	5	6
7	8	9	10	11	12	13
14	15	16	17	18	19	20
21	22	23	24	25	26	27
28	29	30
2026

June 8 in recent years
2026 (Monday)
2025 (Sunday)
2024 (Saturday)
2023 (Thursday)
2022 (Wednesday)
2021 (Tuesday)
2020 (Monday)
2019 (Saturday)
2018 (Friday)
2017 (Thursday)

June 8 is the 159th day of the year (160th in leap years) in the Gregorian calendar; 206 days remain until the end of the year.

== Events ==
=== Pre-1600 ===
- 218 – Battle of Antioch: With the support of the Syrian legions, Elagabalus defeats the forces of emperor Macrinus.
- 452 – Attila leads a Hun army in the invasion of Italy, devastating the northern provinces as he heads for Rome.
- 536 – Election of pope Silverius following the death of pope Agapetus I earlier that year.
- 793 – Vikings raid the abbey at Lindisfarne in Northumbria, commonly accepted as the beginning of Norse activity in the British Isles.
- 1042 – Edward the Confessor becomes King of England – the country's penultimate Anglo-Saxon king.
- 1057 – The Byzantine general Isaac Komnenos is proclaimed Byzantine Emperor in opposition to reigning emperor Michael VI Bringas.
- 1191 – English forces under King Richard I arrive in Acre, joining the already arrived French and German forces of the Third Crusade.

=== 1601–1900 ===
- 1663 – Portuguese Restoration War: Portuguese victory at the Battle of Ameixial ensures Portugal's independence from Spain.
- 1772 – Alexander Fordyce flees to France to avoid debt repayment, triggering the credit crisis of 1772 in the British Empire and the Dutch Republic.
- 1776 – American Revolutionary War: Continental Army attackers are driven back at the Battle of Trois-Rivières.
- 1783 – Laki, a volcano in Iceland, begins an eight-month eruption which kills over 9,000 people and starts a seven-year famine.
- 1789 – James Madison introduces twelve proposed amendments to the United States Constitution in Congress.
- 1794 – Maximilien Robespierre inaugurates the French Revolution's new state religion, the Cult of the Supreme Being, with large organized festivals all across France.
- 1856 – A group of 194 Pitcairn Islanders, descendants of the mutineers of HMS Bounty, arrives at Norfolk Island, commencing the Third Settlement of the Island.
- 1861 – American Civil War: Tennessee secedes from the Union.
- 1862 – American Civil War: A Confederate victory by forces under General Stonewall Jackson at the Battle of Cross Keys, along with the Battle of Port Republic the next day, prevents Union forces from reinforcing General George B. McClellan in his Peninsula campaign.
- 1867 – Coronation of Franz Joseph as King of Hungary following the Austro-Hungarian compromise (Ausgleich).
- 1887 – Herman Hollerith applies for US patent #395,781 for the 'Art of Compiling Statistics', which was his punched card calculator.

=== 1901–present ===
- 1906 – Theodore Roosevelt signs the Antiquities Act into law, authorizing the President to restrict the use of certain parcels of public land with historical or conservation value.
- 1916 – World War I: Italian warship and ex-passenger liner Principe Umberto is torpedoed and sunk by Austro-Hungarian U-Boat SM U-5 with heavy loss of life. It was the worst naval disaster of the war in terms of human lives lost.
- 1924 – British Mount Everest expedition: British mountaineers Andrew Irvine and George Mallory go missing.
- 1928 – Second Northern Expedition: The National Revolutionary Army captures Beijing, whose name is changed to Beiping ("Northern Peace").
- 1929 – Margaret Bondfield is appointed Minister of Labour. She is the first woman appointed to the Cabinet of the United Kingdom.
- 1940 – World War II: The completion of Operation Alphabet, the evacuation of Allied forces from Narvik at the end of the Norwegian campaign.
- 1941 – World War II: The Allies commence the Syria–Lebanon Campaign against the possessions of Vichy France in the Levant.
- 1942 – World War II: The Imperial Japanese Navy submarines I-21 and I-24 shell the Australian cities of Sydney and Newcastle.
- 1943 – World War II: The two-day Battle of Porta between the Royal Italian Army and the Greek People's Liberation Army begins.
- 1949 – George Orwell's dystopian novel Nineteen Eighty-Four is published in the United States
- 1953 – An F5 tornado hits Beecher, Michigan, United States, killing 116, injuring 844, and destroying 340 homes.
- 1953 – The United States Supreme Court rules in District of Columbia v. John R. Thompson Co. that restaurants in Washington, D.C., cannot refuse to serve black patrons.
- 1959 – USS Barbero and the United States Postal Service attempt the delivery of mail via Missile Mail.
- 1961 – Marriage of Prince Edward, Duke of Kent to Katharine Worsley at York Minster.
- 1966 – An F-104 Starfighter collides with XB-70 Valkyrie prototype no. 2, destroying both aircraft during a photo shoot near Edwards Air Force Base. Joseph A. Walker, a NASA test pilot, and Carl Cross, a United States Air Force test pilot, are both killed.
- 1966 – Topeka, Kansas, United States is devastated by a tornado that registers as an "F5" on the Fujita scale, exceeding US$200 million in damages. Seventeen people are killed, over five hundred more injured, and thousands of homes damaged or destroyed.
- 1967 – Six-Day War: The USS Liberty incident: A United States Navy spy ship is attacked by the Israeli Air Force and Navy, resulting in 34 deaths and 171 wounded.
- 1968 – James Earl Ray, the man who assassinated Martin Luther King Jr. is arrested at London Heathrow Airport.
- 1972 – Vietnam War: Nine-year-old Phan Thị Kim Phúc is burned by napalm, an event captured in a photograph moments later while the young girl is seen running naked down a road, in what would become an iconic, Pulitzer Prize-winning photo.
- 1982 – Bluff Cove Air Attacks during the Falklands War: Fifty-six British servicemen are killed by an Argentine air attack on two landing ships, RFA Sir Galahad and RFA Sir Tristram.
- 1982 – VASP Flight 168 crashes in Pacatuba, Ceará, Brazil, killing 128 people.
- 1983 – Reeve Aleutian Airways Flight 8 loses one of its propellers in flight resulting in damage to the flight controls. The Lockheed L-188 Electra makes an emergency landing at Anchorage International Airport and there are no injuries.
- 1984 – Homosexuality is decriminalized in the Australian state of New South Wales.
- 1987 – New Zealand's Labour government establishes a national nuclear-free zone under the New Zealand Nuclear Free Zone, Disarmament, and Arms Control Act 1987.
- 1992 – The first World Oceans Day is celebrated, coinciding with the Earth Summit held in Rio de Janeiro, Brazil.
- 1992 – GP Express Airlines Flight 861 crashes on approach to Anniston Regional Airport in Anniston, Alabama, killing three.
- 1995 – Downed U.S. Air Force pilot Captain Scott O'Grady is rescued by U.S. Marines in Bosnia.
- 2001 – Mamoru Takuma kills eight and injures 15 in a mass stabbing at an elementary school in the Osaka Prefecture of Japan.
- 2004 – The first Venus Transit in well over a century takes place, the previous one being in 1882.
- 2007 – Newcastle, New South Wales, Australia, is hit by the State's worst storms and flooding in 30 years, resulting in the death of nine people and the grounding of a trade ship, the MV Pasha Bulker.
- 2007 – Space Shuttle Atlantis is launched on STS-117 carrying two truss segments and solar arrays to the International Space Station.
- 2008 – Seven people are killed and 11 more are injured in a massacre in Akihabara.
- 2023 – Former US President Donald Trump is indicted on federal charges of misusing classified information.

== Births ==
=== Pre-1600 ===
- 862 – Emperor Xizong of Tang (died 888)
- 1508 – Primož Trubar, Slovenian Protestant reformer (died 1586)
- 1593 – George I Rákóczi, prince of Transylvania (died 1648)

=== 1601–1900 ===
- 1625 – Giovanni Domenico Cassini, Italian-French mathematician and astronomer (died 1712)
- 1651 – William Dampier, explorer, navigator and buccaneer (died 1715)
- 1671 – Tomaso Albinoni, Italian violinist and composer (died 1751)
- 1717 – John Collins, American lawyer and politician, 3rd Governor of Rhode Island (died 1795)
- 1724 – John Smeaton, English engineer, designed the Coldstream Bridge and Perth Bridge (died 1794)
- 1745 – Caspar Wessel, Norwegian-Danish mathematician and cartographer (died 1818)
- 1757 – Ercole Consalvi, Italian cardinal (died 1824)
- 1776 – Thomas Rickman, English architect and architectural antiquary (died 1841)
- 1788 – Charles A. Wickliffe, American politician, 14th Governor of Kentucky (died 1869)
- 1810 – Robert Schumann, German composer and critic (died 1856)
- 1829 – John Everett Millais, English painter and illustrator (died 1896)
- 1831 – Thomas J. Higgins, Canadian-American sergeant, Medal of Honor recipient (died 1917)
- 1842 – John Q. A. Brackett, American lawyer and politician, 36th Governor of Massachusetts (died 1918)
- 1851 – Jacques-Arsène d'Arsonval, French physician and physicist (died 1940)
- 1852 – Guido Banti, Italian physician and pathologist (died 1925)
- 1854 – Douglas Cameron, Canadian politician, 8th Lieutenant Governor of Manitoba (died 1921)
- 1855 – George Charles Haité, English painter and illustrator (died 1924)
- 1858 – Charlotte Scott, English mathematician (died 1931)
- 1860 – Alicia Boole Stott, Irish-English mathematician and theorist (died 1940)
- 1867 – Frank Lloyd Wright, American architect, designed the Price Tower and Fallingwater (died 1959)
- 1868 – Robert Robinson Taylor, American architect (died 1942)
- 1872 – Jan Frans De Boever, Belgian painter and illustrator (died 1949)
- 1876 – Alexandre Tuffère, Greek-French triple jumper (died 1958)
- 1878 – Evan Roberts, Welsh Revivalist minister (died 1951)
- 1885 – Karl Genzken, German physician (died 1957)
- 1891 – William Funnell, Australian public servant (died 1962)
- 1893 – Ernst Marcus, German zoologist (died 1968)
- 1893 – Gaby Morlay, French actress (died 1964)
- 1894 – Erwin Schulhoff, Czech composer and pianist (died 1942)
- 1895 – Santiago Bernabéu, Spanish footballer and manager (died 1978)
- 1897 – John G. Bennett, English mathematician and technologist (died 1974)
- 1899 – Eugène Lapierre, Canadian organist, composer and arts administrator (died 1970)
- 1899 – Ernst-Robert Grawitz, German physician and SS officer, facilitator of medical experiments on concentration camp inmates (died 1945)
- 1899 – Noel Wien, Founded Wien Air Alaska (died 1977)
- 1900 – Lena Baker, African-American maid executed for capital murder, later pardoned posthumously (died 1945)

=== 1901–present ===
- 1903 – Ralph Yarborough, American lawyer and politician (died 1996)
- 1903 – Marguerite Yourcenar, Belgian-French author and poet (died 1987)
- 1910 – John W. Campbell, American journalist and author (died 1971)
- 1910 – Fernand Fonssagrives, French-American photographer, sculptor, and painter (died 2003)
- 1911 – Edmundo Rivero, Argentine singer-songwriter (died 1986)
- 1912 – Wilhelmina Barns-Graham, British abstract painter (died 2004)
- 1912 – Maurice Bellemare, Canadian lawyer and politician (died 1989)
- 1912 – Harry Holtzman, American painter (died 1987)
- 1915 – Seán McCaughey, Irish Republican Army leader, died on hunger strike (died 1946)
- 1915 – Kayyar Kinhanna Rai, Indian journalist, author, and poet (died 2015)
- 1916 – Francis Crick, English biologist, biophysicist, and neuroscientist, Nobel Prize laureate (died 2004)
- 1916 – Luigi Comencini, Italian director and screenwriter (died 2007)
- 1916 – Richard Pousette-Dart, American painter and educator (died 1992)
- 1917 – Byron White, American football player, lawyer and judge (died 2002)
- 1918 – George Edward Hughes, Irish-New Zealand philosopher and logician (died 1994)
- 1918 – Robert Preston, American actor and singer (died 1987)
- 1918 – John D. Roberts, American chemist and academic (died 2016)
- 1919 – John R. Deane, Jr., American general (died 2013)
- 1920 – Gwen Harwood, Australian poet and playwright (died 1995)
- 1921 – Gordon McLendon, American broadcaster and businessman (died 1986)
- 1921 – Olga Nardone, American actress (died 2010)
- 1921 – LeRoy Neiman, American painter (died 2012)
- 1921 – Alexis Smith, Canadian-born American actress and singer (died 1993)
- 1921 – Suharto, Indonesian soldier and politician, 2nd President of Indonesia (died 2008)
- 1923 – Alice Coleman, English geographer (directed UK Land Use Survey) England (died 2023)
- 1924 – Billie Dawe, Canadian ice hockey player and manager (died 2013)
- 1924 – Kenneth Waltz, American political scientist and academic (died 2013)
- 1925 – Barbara Bush, American wife of George H. W. Bush, 41st First Lady of the United States (died 2018)
- 1927 – Jerry Stiller, American actor, comedian and producer (died 2020)
- 1928 – Gustavo Gutiérrez, Peruvian philosopher, theologian and priest (died 2024)
- 1928 – J. R. P. Suriyapperuma, Sri Lankan politician (died 2025)
- 1928 – Kate Wilhelm, American fiction author (Hugo Award winner) (died 2018)
- 1929 – Nada Inada, Japanese psychiatrist and author (died 2013)
- 1930 – Robert Aumann, German-American mathematician and economist, Nobel Prize laureate
- 1930 – Marcel Léger, Canadian lawyer and politician (died 1993)
- 1931 – Dana Wynter, British actress (died 2011)
- 1932 – Ray Illingworth, English cricketer and sportscaster (died 2021)
- 1932 – Ian Kirkwood, Lord Kirkwood, Scottish lawyer and judge (died 2017)
- 1933 – Joan Rivers, American comedian, actress, and television host (died 2014)
- 1934 – Millicent Martin, English actress and singer
- 1935 – Molade Okoya-Thomas, Nigerian businessman and philanthropist (died 2015)
- 1936 – James Darren, American actor (died 2024)
- 1936 – Kenneth G. Wilson, American physicist and academic, Nobel Prize laureate (died 2013)
- 1937 – Gillian Clarke, Welsh poet and playwright
- 1937 – Bruce McCandless II, American aviator, electrical engineer and astronaut (died 2017)
- 1938 – Angelo Amato, Italian cardinal
- 1939 – Herb Adderley, American football player (died 2020)
- 1939 – Bill Watrous, American comedian, actress, and television host (died 2014)
- 1940 – Nancy Sinatra, American singer and actress
- 1941 – Robert Bradford, Northern Irish politician and activist (died 1981)
- 1941 – George Pell, Australian cardinal (died 2023)
- 1942 – Doug Mountjoy, Welsh snooker player (died 2021)
- 1942 – Chuck Negron, American singer (Three Dog Night) (died 2026)
- 1943 – Colin Baker, English actor
- 1943 – William Calley, American military officer
- 1943 – Willie Davenport, American hurdler (died 2002)
- 1944 – Marc Ouellet, Canadian archbishop and cardinal
- 1944 – Boz Scaggs, American singer-songwriter and guitarist
- 1945 – Steven Fromholz, American singer-songwriter, producer, and poet (died 2014)
- 1945 – Derek Underwood, English cricketer (died 2024)
- 1946 – Graham Henry, New Zealand rugby player and coach
- 1947 – Annie Haslam, English singer-songwriter and painter
- 1947 – Sara Paretsky, American author
- 1947 – Eric F. Wieschaus, American biologist, geneticist, and academic Nobel Prize laureate
- 1949 – Emanuel Ax, Polish-American pianist and educator
- 1949 – Hildegard Falck, German runner
- 1950 – Kathy Baker, American actress
- 1950 – Sônia Braga, Brazilian actress and producer
- 1951 – Bonnie Tyler, Welsh singer-songwriter (died 2026)
- 1951 – Tony Rice, American bluegrass musician (died 2020)
- 1953 – Ivo Sanader, Croatian historian and politician, 8th Prime Minister of Croatia
- 1954 – Kiril of Varna, Bulgarian metropolitan (died 2013)
- 1954 – Sergei Storchak, Ukrainian-Russian politician
- 1955 – Tim Berners-Lee, English computer scientist, invented the World Wide Web
- 1955 – José Antonio Camacho, Spanish footballer and manager
- 1957 – Scott Adams, American author and illustrator (died 2026)
- 1957 – Dimple Kapadia, Indian actress
- 1958 – Louise Richardson, Irish political scientist and academic
- 1959 – Mohsen Kadivar, Iranian philosopher
- 1960 – Neil Baker, Australian rugby league player
- 1960 – Mick Hucknall, English singer-songwriter
- 1960 – Thomas Steen, Swedish ice hockey player and coach
- 1961 – Mary Bonauto, American lawyer and gay rights activist
- 1964 – Butch Reynolds, American runner and coach
- 1965 – Kevin Farley, American screenwriter
- 1966 – Julianna Margulies, American actress
- 1967 – Russell E. Morris, Welsh chemist and academic
- 1967 – Kathryn Tickell, English traditional folk musician, Northumbrian smallpipe bagpiper
- 1969 – David Barnhill, Australian rugby league player
- 1970 – Gabby Giffords, American politician and advocate for ending gun violence in the United States
- 1970 – Steve Renouf, Australian rugby league player
- 1970 – Kelli Williams, American actress and director
- 1971 – Bernard Grech, Maltese lawyer and politician
- 1974 – Lauren Burns, Australian taekwondo practitioner
- 1975 – Mark Ricciuto, Australian footballer and sportcaster
- 1976 – Lindsay Davenport, American tennis player
- 1977 – Kanye West, American rapper, producer, director, and fashion designer
- 1978 – Maria Menounos, American television personality, professional wrestler, author, and actress
- 1979 – Derek Trucks, American guitarist, former member of the Allman Brothers band
- 1981 – Rachel Held Evans, American Christian author (died 2019)
- 1981 – Sara Watkins, American fiddle, ukulele, and guitar player
- 1982 – Nadia Petrova, Russian tennis player
- 1983 – Kim Clijsters, Belgian tennis player; winner of six Grand Slam tournament titles.
- 1984 – Javier Mascherano, Argentine footballer and manager
- 1985 – Alexandre Despatie, Canadian diver, twice Olympic silver 3m springboard silver medallist
- 1986 – Keith Gill, American financial analyst and investor
- 1989 – Timea Bacsinszky, Swiss tennis player
- 1994 – Liv Morgan, American professional wrestler
- 1995 – Jean Butez, French footballer
- 1995 – Ferland Mendy, French footballer
- 1997 – Jeļena Ostapenko, Latvian tennis player
- 2000 – Jan Paul van Hecke, Dutch footballer
- 2004 – Francesca Capaldi, American actress

== Deaths ==
=== Pre-1600 ===
- 632 – Muhammad, the central figure of Islam. (born 570/571)
- 696 – Chlodulf, bishop of Metz (or 697)
- 951 – Zhao Ying, Chinese chancellor (born 885)
- 1042 – Harthacnut, English-Danish king (born 1018)
- 1154 – William of York, English archbishop and saint
- 1290 – Beatrice Portinari, object of Dante Alighieri's adoration (born 1266)
- 1376 – Edward, the Black Prince, English son of Edward III of England (born 1330)
- 1383 – Thomas de Ros, 4th Baron de Ros, English politician (born 1338)
- 1384 – Kan'ami, Japanese actor and playwright (born 1333)
- 1405 – Richard le Scrope, Archbishop of York (born c. 1350)
- 1405 – Thomas de Mowbray, 4th Earl of Norfolk (born 1385)
- 1476 – George Neville, English archbishop and academic (born 1432)
- 1492 – Elizabeth Woodville, Queen consort of England (born 1437)
- 1501 – George Gordon, 2nd Earl of Huntly, Earl of Huntly and Lord Chancellor of Scotland (born 1440)
- 1505 – Hongzhi Emperor of China (born 1470)
- 1600 – Edward Fortunatus, German nobleman (born 1565)

=== 1601–1900 ===
- 1611 – Jean Bertaut, French bishop and poet (born 1552)
- 1612 – Hans Leo Hassler, German organist and composer (born 1562)
- 1621 – Anne de Xainctonge, French saint, founded the Society of the Sisters of Saint Ursula of the Blessed Virgin (born 1567)
- 1628 – Rudolph Goclenius, German lexicographer and philosopher (born 1547)
- 1651 – Tokugawa Iemitsu, Japanese shōgun (born 1604)
- 1714 – Sophia of Hanover, German nobility, ancestress of all British Monarchs since 1714 (born 1630)
- 1716 – Johann Wilhelm, Elector Palatine, German son of Landgravine Elisabeth Amalie of Hesse-Darmstadt (born 1658)
- 1727 – August Hermann Francke, German-Lutheran pietist, philanthropist, and scholar (born 1663)
- 1768 – Johann Joachim Winckelmann, German archaeologist and scholar (born 1717)
- 1771 – George Montagu-Dunk, 2nd Earl of Halifax, English politician, Lord Lieutenant of Ireland (born 1716)
- 1795 – Louis XVII of France (born 1785)
- 1809 – Thomas Paine, English-American theorist and author (born 1737)
- 1831 – Sarah Siddons, Welsh actress (born 1755)
- 1835 – Gian Domenico Romagnosi, Italian economist and jurist (born 1761)
- 1845 – Andrew Jackson, American general, judge, and politician, 7th President of the United States (born 1767)
- 1846 – Rodolphe Töpffer, Swiss teacher, author, painter, cartoonist, and caricaturist (born 1799)
- 1857 – Douglas William Jerrold, English journalist and playwright (born 1803)
- 1874 – Cochise, American tribal chief (born 1805)
- 1876 – George Sand, French author and playwright (born 1804)
- 1885 – Ignace Bourget, Canadian bishop (born 1799)
- 1889 – Gerard Manley Hopkins, English poet (born 1844)
- 1899 – Mary of the Divine Heart, German nun and saint (born 1863)

=== 1901–present ===
- 1913 – Emily Davison, English suffragette (born 1872)
- 1919 – Cora Agnes Benneson, American attorney (born 1851)
- 1951 – Eugène Fiset, Canadian physician, general, and politician, 18th Lieutenant Governor of Quebec (born 1874)
- 1956 – Marie Laurencin, French painter and sculptor (born 1883)
- 1966 – Anton Melik, Slovenian geographer and academic (born 1890)
- 1968 – Elizabeth Enright, American author and illustrator (born 1909)
- 1968 – Ludovico Scarfiotti, Italian racing driver (born 1933)
- 1969 – Arunachalam Mahadeva, Sri Lankan politician and diplomat (born 1885)
- 1969 – Robert Taylor, American actor (born 1911)
- 1970 – Abraham Maslow, American psychologist and academic (born 1908)
- 1971 – J. I. Rodale, American author and playwright (born 1898)
- 1976 – Thorleif Schjelderup-Ebbe, Norwegian zoologist and psychologist (born 1894)
- 1982 – Satchel Paige, American baseball player (born 1906)
- 1984 – Gordon Jacob, English composer and academic (born 1895)
- 1987 – Alexander Iolas, Egyptian-American art collector (born 1907)
- 1995 – Juan Carlos Onganía, Argentine general and politician, 35th President of Argentina (born 1914)
- 1997 – George Turner, Australian author and critic (born 1916)
- 1997 – Karen Wetterhahn, American chemist and academic (born 1948)
- 1998 – Sani Abacha, Nigerian general and politician, 10th President of Nigeria (born 1943)
- 1998 – Maria Reiche, German mathematician and archaeologist (born 1903)
- 2000 – Frédéric Dard, French author and screenwriter (born 1921)
- 2001 – Alex de Renzy, American director and producer (born 1935)
- 2004 – Charles Hyder, American astrophysicist and academic (born 1930)
- 2004 – Mack Jones, American baseball player (born 1938)
- 2006 – Jaxon, American illustrator and publisher, co-founded Rip Off Press (born 1941)
- 2006 – Matta El Meskeen, Egyptian monk, theologian, and author (born 1919)
- 2009 – Omar Bongo, Gabonese captain and politician, President of Gabon (born 1935)
- 2010 – Denise Narcisse-Mair, Canadian musician (born 1940)
- 2012 – Charles E. M. Pearce, New Zealand-Australian mathematician and academic (born 1940)
- 2012 – Ghassan Tueni, Lebanese journalist, academic, and politician (born 1926)
- 2013 – Paul Cellucci, American soldier and politician, 69th Governor of Massachusetts (born 1948)
- 2013 – Yoram Kaniuk, Israeli painter, journalist, and critic (born 1930)
- 2013 – Taufiq Kiemas, Indonesian politician, 5th First Spouse of Indonesia (born 1942)
- 2014 – Alexander Imich, Polish-American chemist, parapsychologist, and academic (born 1903)
- 2014 – Yoshihito, Prince Katsura of Japan (born 1948)
- 2015 – Chea Sim, Cambodian commander and politician (born 1932)
- 2018 – Anthony Bourdain, American chef and travel documentarian (born 1956)
- 2019 – Andre Matos, Brazilian heavy metal musician (born 1971)
- 2022 – Paula Rego, Portuguese-British visual artist (born 1935)
- 2023 – Pat Robertson, American televangelist (born 1930)
- 2024 – Ramoji Rao, Indian businessman, media proprietor and film producer (born 1936)
- 2024 – Chet Walker, American basketball player (born 1940)

== Holidays and observances ==
- Christian feast day:
  - Chlodulf of Metz
  - Jacques Berthieu, S.J.
  - Jadwiga (Hedwig) of Poland
  - Mariam Thresia Chiramel
  - Blessed Mary of the Divine Heart (Droste zu Vischering)
  - Medard
  - Melania the Elder
  - Roland Allen (Episcopal Church (USA))
  - Thomas Ken (Church of England)
  - William of York
  - June 8 (Eastern Orthodox liturgics)
- First Indochina War day (France)
- Bounty Day (Norfolk Island)
- Caribbean American HIV/AIDS Awareness Day
- Engineer's Day (Peru)
- Primož Trubar Day (Slovenia)
- World Brain Tumor Day
- World Oceans Day
