= June 22 (Eastern Orthodox liturgics) =

Day in the Eastern Orthodox liturgical calendar

Eastern Orthodox liturgical calendar
June 21	June 22	June 23
June 22 O.S. ≍ July 5 N.S. June 22 N.S ≍ June 9 O.S.

An Eastern Orthodox cross

June 22 in Eastern Orthodox liturgical calendars is a feast day and a day of commemoration of saints and martyrs. Although some Orthodox churches use the Revised Julian Calendar and others use the traditional Julian calendar, the fixed commemorations for their respective June 22 are broadly the same, no matter which calendar is used. (Note: Despite the dates being the same, the days to which they refer typically differ by 13 days. The notation Old Style or O.S. is sometimes used to indicate a date in the traditional Julian Calendar (the "Old Calendar"). The notation New Style or N.S. indicates a date in the Revised Julian calendar (the "New Calendar").)

== Saints ==
- Martyrs Zeno and his servant Zenas, of Philadelphia in Arabia (Amman) (304)
- Martyrs Galacteon and Pompeian, by drowning, in Petra, Constantinople.
- Martyrs Juliana and her son Saturninus, by fire, in Petra, Constantinople.
- Hieromartyr Eusebius of Samosata, Bishop of Samosata (380) (Note: Name days celebrated today include: Eusebius, Eusevios (Εὐσέβιος); Eusebia, Eusevia (Εὐσεβία).)
- St. Athanasius, Bishop of Chytri on Cyprus (4th century)
- 1,480 martyrs of Samaria (Sebasteia) in Palestine (c. 615) (Note: "At Samaria, fourteen hundred and eighty holy martyrs, under Chosroes, king of Persia.")
- Saint Basil, Abbot of Patalaria Monastery (8th-9th centuries)

== Pre-Schism Western saints ==
- Saint Flavius Clemens, Flavius Clemens, brother of the Emperor Vespasian and uncle of Titus and Domitian, he was beheaded for the Orthodox Faith (c. 96) (Note: Brother of the Emperor Vespasian and uncle of Titus and Domitian, whose niece, Flavia Domitilla, he married. In the year 95 he held consular office together with Domitian. The following year Domitian had him beheaded for the Orthodox Faith.) (Note: "At Rome, the translation of St. Flavius Clemens, ex-consul and martyr, who was put to death for the faith of Christ by the emperor Domitian. His body was found in the basilica of pope St. Clement, and buried there with great pomp.")
- Saint Alban, protomartyr of Britain, in the Roman city of Verulamium (modern St Albans) (304) (Note: "At Verulam, in England, in the time of Diocletian, St. Alban, martyr, who gave himself up to save a cleric whom he had harbored. After being scourged and subjected to bitter torments, he was sentenced to capital punishment. With him suffered also one of the soldiers that led him to execution, who was converted to Christ on the way, and merited to be baptized, in his own blood.") (see also: June 20 )
- St. Paulinus the Merciful, Bishop of Nola (431) (Note: Pontius Meropius Amcius Paulinus was born in Bordeaux in France, the son of a Roman patrician. Appointed prefect of Rome, after the death of his only child in 390 he left the world and went to Spain, where the people of Barcelona forced him to accept the priesthood. Finally he settled as a hermit near Nola in Campania in Italy and there the people chose him as their bishop (400). He proved to be one of the finest bishops of his age. He suffer greatly during the invasion of Campania by the Goths under Alaric. Most of his writings survive.) (Note: "AT Nola, in Campania, the birthday of blessed Paulinus, bishop and confessor, who, although a most noble and wealthy man, made himself poor and humble for Christ; and what is still more admirable, became a slave to liberate a widow's son, who had been carried to Africa by the Vandals, when they devastated Campania. He was celebrated, not only for his learning and exceptional holiness of life, but also for his power over the demons. His great merit has been extolled by Saints Ambrose, Jerome, Augustine and Gregory, in their writings. His body, at first transferred to Benevento, and thence to Rome, was restored to Nola by order of Pius X.")
- Saint John I of Naples, Bishop of Naples in Italy (5th century) (Note: "At Naples, in Campania, St. John, bishop, who was called to the kingdom of heaven by blessed Paulinus, bishop of Nola.")
- Saint Aaron of Aleth (Aihran, Eran), hermit, monk and abbot at a monastery on Cézembre, a small island near Aleth, opposite Saint-Malo in Brittany, France (c.552) (Note: Probably born in Wales, he went to Brittany and lived as a hermit at what is now St Malo. Later he was joined by disciples, among them St Malo, and he became their abbot.)
- Saint Consortia, founder of a convent in France endowed by King Clotaire after she miraculously healed his dying daughter; she was venerated at Cluny (c. 570) (Note: "In the monastery of Cluny, St. Consortia, virgin.")
- Saint John IV of Naples, known as 'the Peacemaker', he was Bishop of Naples in Italy, where he is venerated as a patron-saint (835)
- Saint Rotrudis, kinswoman of Charlemagne, a saint whose relics were enshrined at Saint Bertin in Saint-Omer, France (c. 869)
- Venerable Virgin-martyr Æbbe the Younger of Coldingham, Abbess of Coldingham Priory in south-east Scotland, and those with her (870) (Note: "There is no surviving record of this Ebbe older than Matthew Paris, and no ancient cult, but there was a shrine in the 13th century and a curious feast of a dedication of the altar of St. Ebbe on 22 June in a Coldingham manuscript may refer to this Ebbe or to her namesake.") (see also: April 2 )

== Post-Schism Orthodox saints ==
- Saint Gregory, Metropolitan of Wallachia (1834) (Note: See: (in Romanian) Listă de mitropoliți ai Ungrovlahiei. Wikipedia (Romanian Wikipedia).)

=== New martyrs and confessors ===
- New Hieromartyr Gennadius, Priest (1918)
- New Hieromartyrs Theodore Smirnov and Gabriel Archangelsky, Deacons (1938)
- New Hieromartyr Michael Stephanovsky.

== Other commemorations ==
- Repose of Righteous Mary the Cave-digger, of White Mountain Monastery near Voronezh (1822)
- Repose of Hieromonk Andrew, slain at Comana, Georgia (1993)

== Icon gallery ==
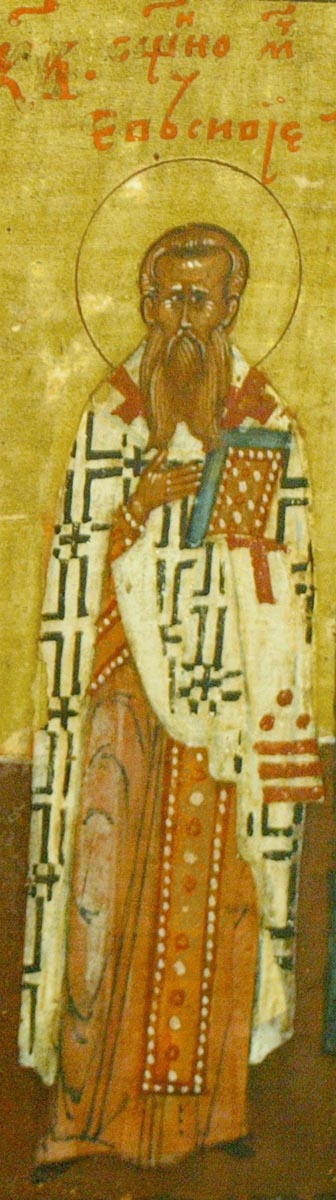
Hieromartyr Eusebius, Bishop of Samosata.

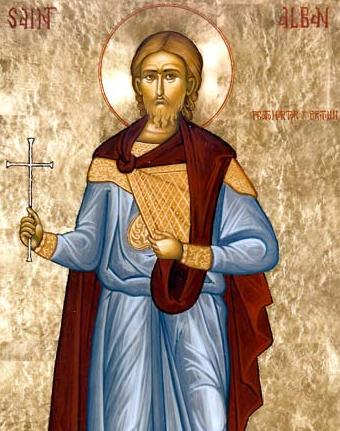
St. Alban, protomartyr of Britain.

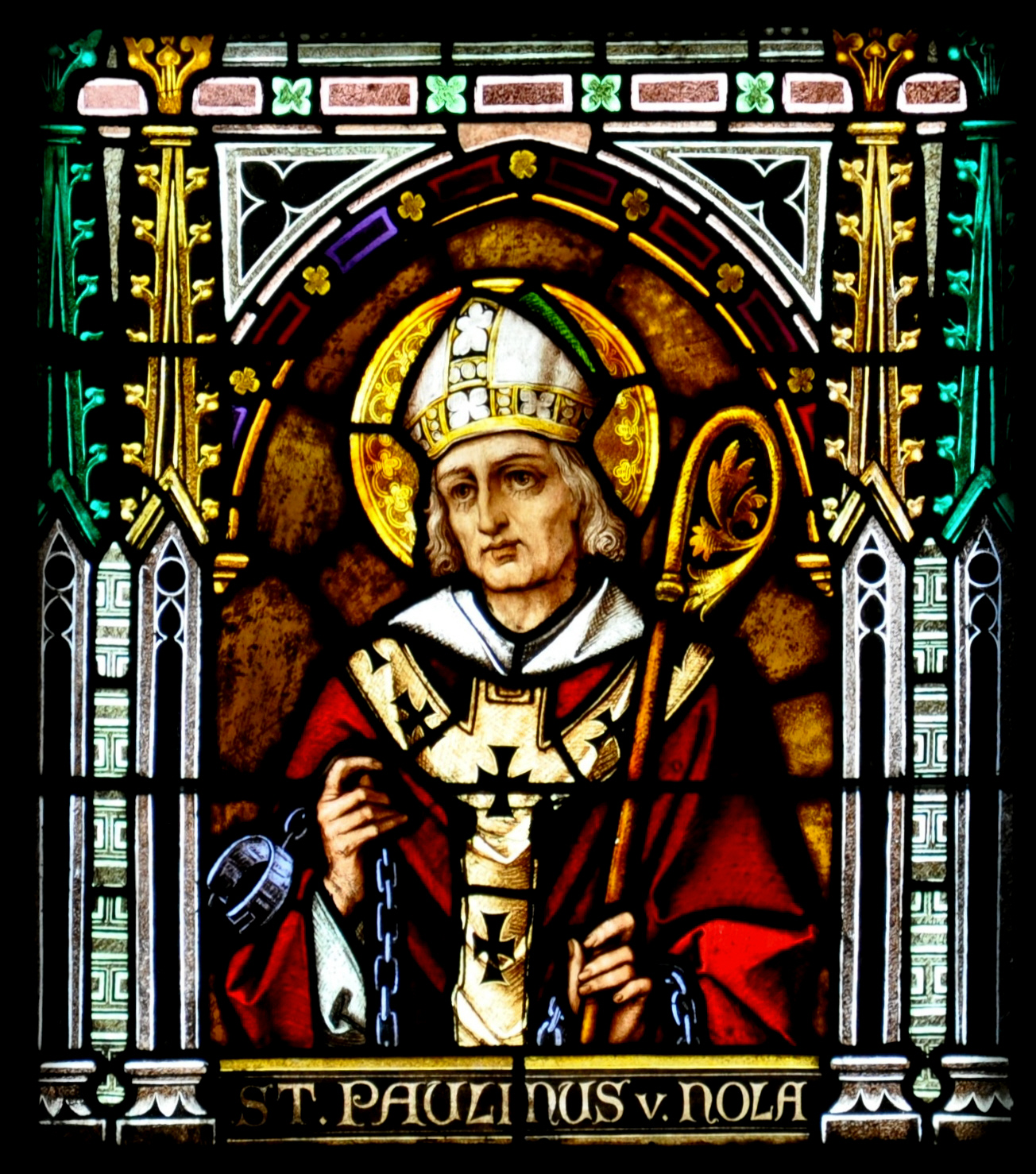
St. Paulinus the Merciful, Bishop of Nola.

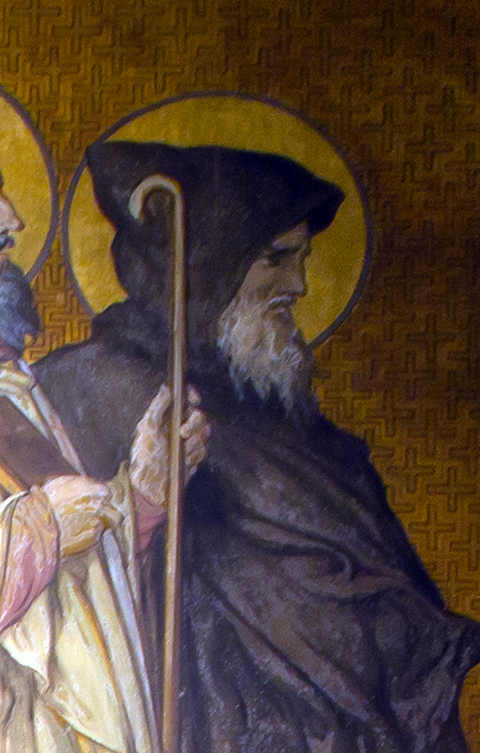
St. Aaron of Aleth.

== Sources ==
- June 22/July 5. Orthodox Calendar (PRAVOSLAVIE.RU).
- July 5 / June 22. HOLY TRINITY RUSSIAN ORTHODOX CHURCH (A parish of the Patriarchate of Moscow).
- June 22. OCA - The Lives of the Saints.
- The Autonomous Orthodox Metropolia of Western Europe and the Americas (ROCOR). St. Hilarion Calendar of Saints for the year of our Lord 2004. St. Hilarion Press (Austin, TX). p. 46.
- The Twenty-Second Day of the Month of June. Orthodoxy in China.
- June 22. Latin Saints of the Orthodox Patriarchate of Rome.
- The Roman Martyrology. Transl. by the Archbishop of Baltimore. Last Edition, According to the Copy Printed at Rome in 1914. Revised Edition, with the Imprimatur of His Eminence Cardinal Gibbons. Baltimore: John Murphy Company, 1916. pp. 181–182.
- Rev. Richard Stanton. A Menology of England and Wales, or, Brief Memorials of the Ancient British and English Saints Arranged According to the Calendar, Together with the Martyrs of the 16th and 17th Centuries. London: Burns & Oates, 1892. pp. 281–284.

Greek Sources

- Great Synaxaristes: (in Greek) 22 ΙΟΥΝΙΟΥ. ΜΕΓΑΣ ΣΥΝΑΞΑΡΙΣΤΗΣ.
- (in Greek) Συναξαριστής. 22 Ιουνίου. ECCLESIA.GR. (H ΕΚΚΛΗΣΙΑ ΤΗΣ ΕΛΛΑΔΟΣ).
- (in Greek) 22 Ιουνίου. Αποστολική Διακονία της Εκκλησίας της Ελλάδος (Apostoliki Diakonia of the Church of Greece).
- (in Greek) 22/06/2018. Ορθόδοξος Συναξαριστής.

Russian Sources

- (in Russian) 5 июля (22 июня). Православная Энциклопедия под редакцией Патриарха Московского и всея Руси Кирилла (электронная версия). (Orthodox Encyclopedia - Pravenc.ru).
- (in Russian) 22 июня по старому стилю / 5 июля по новому стилю. Русская Православная Церковь - Православный церковный календарь на 2017 год.
- (in Russian) 22 июня (ст.ст.) 5 июля 2014 (нов. ст.). Русская Православная Церковь Отдел внешних церковных связей. (DECR).
