= June 8 (Eastern Orthodox liturgics) =

Day in the Eastern Orthodox liturgical calendar

Eastern Orthodox liturgical calendar
June 7	June 8	June 9
June 8 O.S. ≍ June 21 N.S. June 8 N.S ≍ May 26 O.S.

An Eastern Orthodox cross

June 8 in Eastern Orthodox liturgical calendars is a feast day and a day of commemoration of saints and martyrs. Although some Orthodox churches use the Revised Julian Calendar and others use the traditional Julian calendar, the fixed commemorations for their respective June 8 are broadly the same, no matter which calendar is used. (Note: Despite the dates being the same, the days to which they refer typically differ by 13 days. The notation Old Style or O.S. is sometimes used to indicate a date in the traditional Julian Calendar (the "Old Calendar"). The notation New Style or N.S. indicates a date in the Revised Julian calendar (the "New Calendar").)

== Saints ==
- Martyr Calliope (Kalliope), at Rome (c. 250) (Note: "The same day, St. Calliopa, martyr, who, for the faith of Christ, had her breasts cut off, her flesh burned, was rolled on broken pottery, and being lastly decapitated, received the palm of martyrdom.") (Note: "THIS martyr, according to the Greek Menaea, was as beautiful in soul as she was in body. Her breasts were cut off, she was dragged over potsherds, then salt was rubbed into her wounds, and they were fretted with hair-cloth. As none of these tortures shook her constancy, her head was struck off.") (Note: Name days celebrated today include: Kalliope, Kalliopi, Popi (Καλλιόπη).)
- Martyrs Nicander and Marcian, at Dorostolum in Moesia (297 or 303) (Note: In the West on June 17.)
- Martyr Mark, by the sword.
- Saint Naucratius, brother of St. Basil the Great (4th century)
- Venerable Melania the Elder, nun, of Palladius’ Lausiac History (410) (Note: An aristocrat of Rome who visited the Holy Land, founding a monastery on the Mount of Olives.)
- Venerable Atre (Athre) of Nitria in Egypt (5th century)
- Saint Ephraim of Antioch, Patriarch of Antioch (545)
- Venerable Zosimas, monk, of Phoenicia (Syria) (6th century)
- Venerable Paul the Confessor, of Kaiuma Monastery in Constantinople (c. 771-775)

== Pre-Schism Western saints ==
- Saint Maximinus of Aix, venerated as the first Bishop of Aix in Provence in France (1st century) (Note: "AT Aix, in France, St. Maximin, first bishop of that city, who is said to have been a disciple of our Lord.")
- Saint Sallustian of Sardinia, confessor. (Note: A saint honoured in Sardinia from time immemorial. By some he is described as a martyr, by others as a hermit.)
- Saint Bron, a disciple of St Patrick and Bishop of Cassel-lrra near Sligo in Ireland (c. 511)
- Saint Gildard (Godard), Bishop of Rouen in France for some fifteen years (514)
- Saint Heraclius of Sens, the fourteenth Bishop of Sens in France (c. 515) (Note: He was present in the Cathedral in Rheims at the baptism of Clovis and built the monastery of St John the Evangelist in Sens.)
- Saints Severinus of Sanseverino (550) and Victorinus of Camerino (543), brothers who were both bishops and hermits in the 6th century. (Note: Saint Severinus was Bishop of Septempeda, now called after him Sanseverino in the Marches of Ancona in Italy. He and his brother Victorinus distributed their wealth among the poor and became hermits at Montenero. They were forced by Pope Vigilius to become bishops, the former of Septempeda, the latter of Camerino. Severinus reposed shortly before Septempeda was destroyed by the Ostrogoth Totila.)
- Saint Medardus the Wonderworker, Bishop of Noyon (c. 558) (Note: Born in Picardy in the north of France, he was ordained at the age of thirty-three. In 530 he became Bishop of Vermand, later Noyon and then Tournai in Belgium.) (Note: "At Soissons, in France, the birthday of St. Medard, bishop of Noyon, whose life and precious death are illustrated by glorious miracles.") (Note: "The Roman Martyrology says: — "At Rouen, S. Gildard, or Godard, B., brother of S. Medard, B. of Noyon. They were born the same day, consecrated bishops the same day, and dying the same day, ascended to heaven together." This is a mistake. It can be conclusively proved that S. Medard died about thirty-four years later than S. Godard, and that there is no ancient authority for saying they were brothers. The lives of S. Medard are silent on the subject, even one written in the 11th cent. S. Godard subscribed the 1st council of Orleans, as B. of Rouen, In 511, and S. Medard was consecrated in 530. One is surprised to see that Giry and Guerin take no notice of this complete annihilation of the fable of the relationship of these two saints, but give them as brothers born the same day, consecrated the same day, and dying the same day, with sublime superiority to criticism and historical accuracy.")
- Venerable Levan (Selevan), who came to Cornwall and gave his name to St Levan (6th century)
- Saint Eustadiola, born in Bourges in France, as a widow she spent her fortune building Moyenmoutier Abbey, where she became a nun and abbess (690)
- Saint Chlodulf of Metz (Clodulphus, Clodulf), son of St Arnulf, Bishop of Metz, he too became Bishop of Metz, for forty years (696)
- Venerable Muirchú (Maccutinus), a holy man in Ireland who wrote Lives of St Brigid and St Patrick (7th century)
- Venerable Syra (Syria), by tradition, the sister of St Fiacre (Fiaker), an anchoress in France (7th century) (Note: See: (in French) Syre (sainte). Wikipédia. (French Wikipedia).) (see also: October 23 )

== Post-Schism Orthodox saints ==
- Saint Theodore, Bishop of Rostov and Suzdal (c. 1023) (Note: See: (in Russian) Феодор I (епископ Ростовский). Википе́дия. (Russian Wikipedia).)
- Venerable Theophilus of Luga and Omutch (1412), disciple of St. Arsenius of Konevits.
- New monk-martyr Theophanes, at Constantinople (1559)
- Saint Nicephorus (Cantacuzene), Archdeacon, of Constantinople, who suffered under the Uniates in Marienburg, Galicia (1599)
- New Hieromartyr Theodore, Priest, of Kvelta, Georgia (1609)

== Other commemorations ==
- Translation of the relics of Great-martyr Theodore Stratelates ("the General"), of Heraclea (319) (Note: Emperor Constantine IX Monomachos (1042-1055) bestowed a part of the relics of Great-martyr Theodore Stratelates to the Great Lavra of Mount Athos, via a chrysobull.)
- Translation of the relics (1023) of Hieromartyr Alphege, abbot of Canterbury (1012)
- Uncovering of the relics (1501) of Saints Basil (1249) (Note: See: (in Russian) Василий Всеволодович. Википе́дия. (Russian Wikipedia).) and Constantine (1257), (Note: See: (in Russian) Константин Всеволодович (князь ярославский). Википе́дия. (Russian Wikipedia).) Princes of Yaroslavl.
- Synaxis of the Church of the Most Holy Theotokos and the Archangel Michael (the "Michaelion"), in the Sosthenion district of Constantinople. (Note: The Michaelion was one of the earliest and most famous sanctuaries dedicated to Archangel Michael in the Roman Empire. According to tradition, it was built in the 4th century by Emperor Constantine the Great (r. 306-337) over an ancient pagan temple. The pagan temple which had existed there had been previously associated with healing and medicine, and the Christians continued to associate the location and the Michaelion with healing waters. Michaelion was a magnificent church and became a model for hundreds of other churches in Eastern Christianity. It also had a chapel dedicated to the Theotokos.)
- Synaxis of the Church of the Cross at Mtskheta, Georgia.
- Glorification of St John of Kronstadt by the Russian Orthodox Church (1990) (Note: Father John was canonized by the Russian Orthodox Church Outside Russia in 1964, and by the Russian Orthodox Church in 1990. Archbishop John Maximovitch of Shanghai and San Francisco (later also glorified as a Saint) played an active role in preparation of St. John's canonization.)
- Repose of lay elder Theodore (Sokolov) of White Lake (1973)

=== Icons ===
- Yaroslavl Icon of the Most Holy Theotokos (13th century) (Note: See: (in Russian) Ярославская икона Божией Матери. Википе́дия. (Russian Wikipedia).)
- Uryupinsk Icon of the Most Holy Theotokos (1821)

== Icon gallery ==
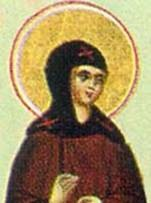
Venerable Melania the Elder.

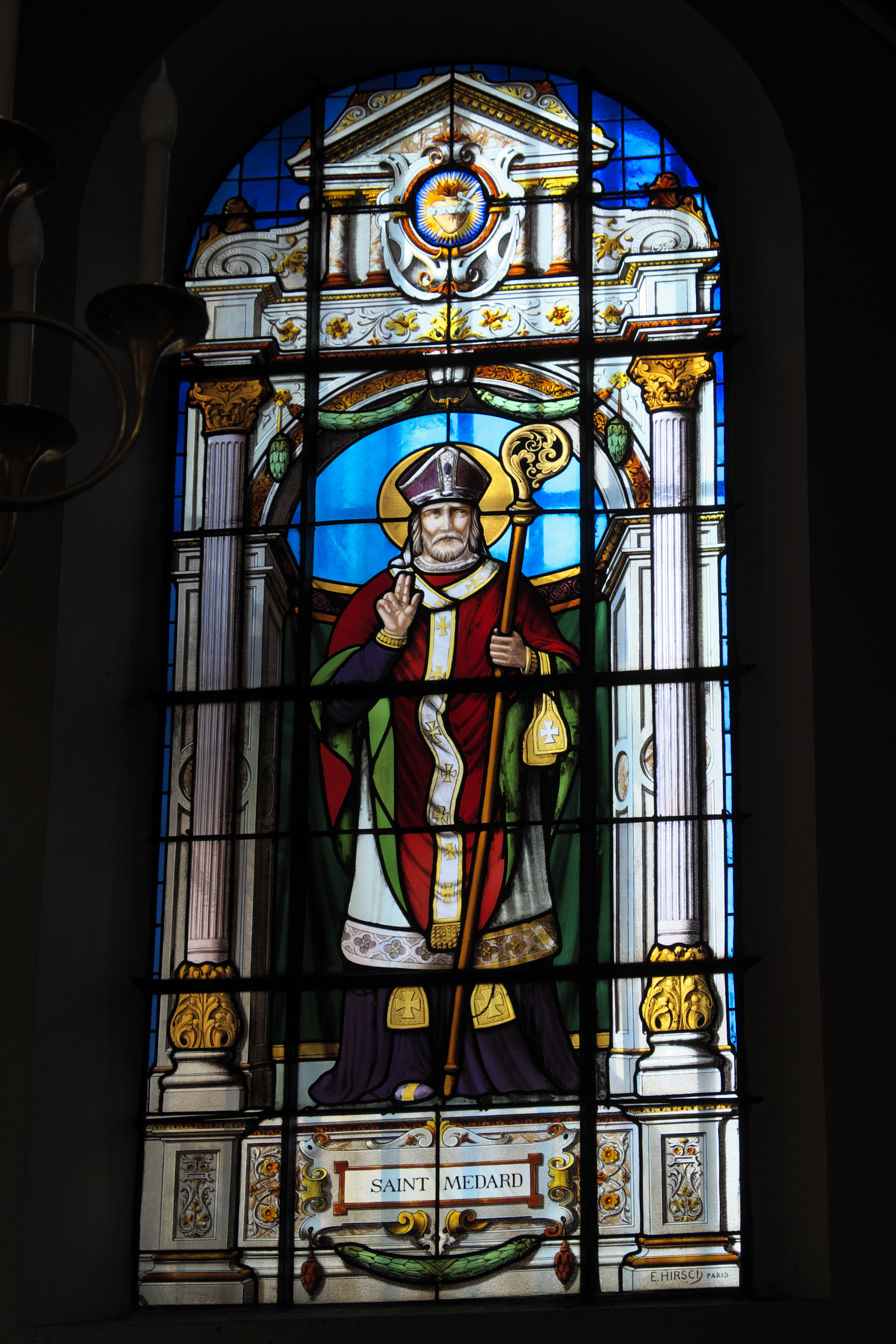
St. Medardus the Wonderworker, Bishop of Noyon.

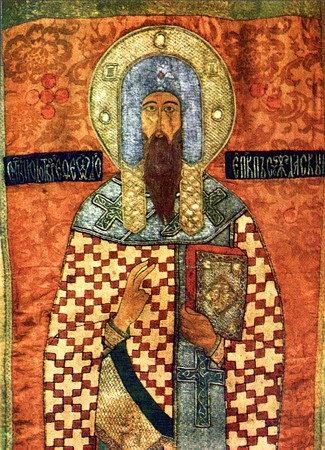
St. Theodore, Bishop of Rostov and Suzdal.

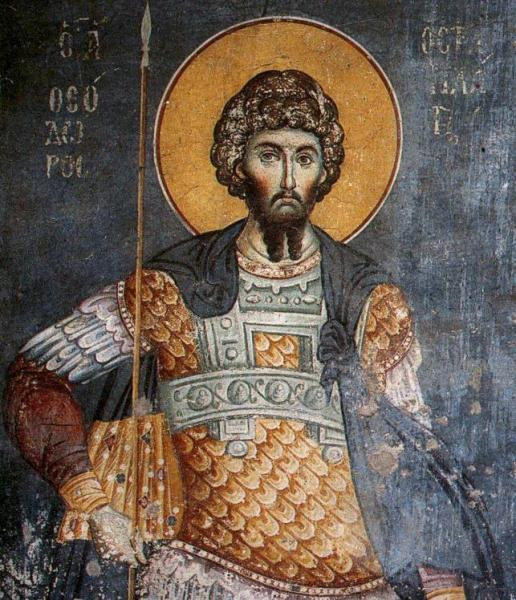
Great-martyr Theodore Stratelates ("the General"), of Heraclea.

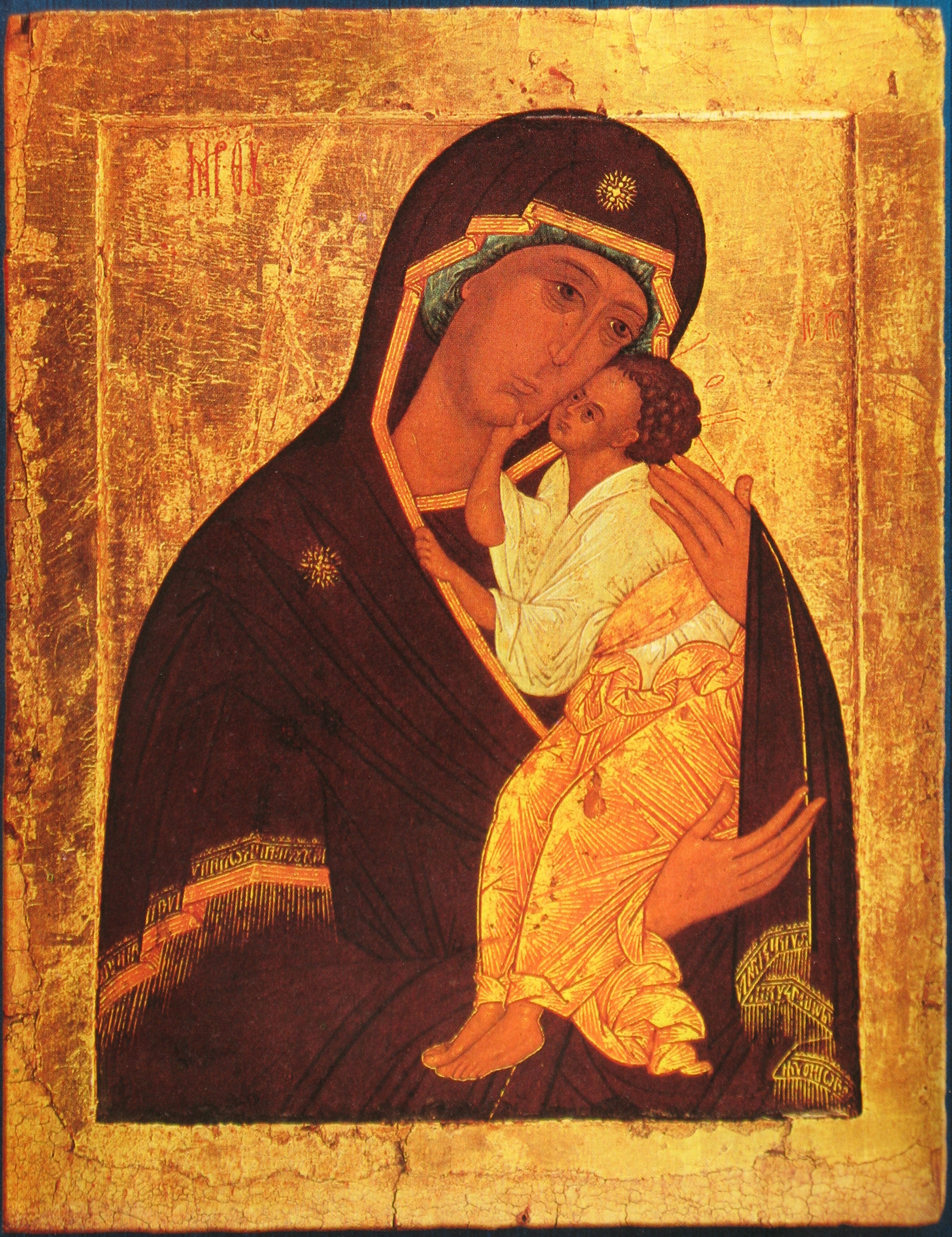
Yaroslavl Icon of the Most Holy Theotokos.

== Sources ==
- June 8/21. Orthodox Calendar (PRAVOSLAVIE.RU).
- June 21 / June 8. HOLY TRINITY RUSSIAN ORTHODOX CHURCH (A parish of the Patriarchate of Moscow).
- June 8. OCA - The Lives of the Saints.
- The Autonomous Orthodox Metropolia of Western Europe and the Americas (ROCOR). St. Hilarion Calendar of Saints for the year of our Lord 2004. St. Hilarion Press (Austin, TX). p. 42.
- The Eighth Day of the Month of June. Orthodoxy in China.
- June 8. Latin Saints of the Orthodox Patriarchate of Rome.
- The Roman Martyrology. Transl. by the Archbishop of Baltimore. Last Edition, According to the Copy Printed at Rome in 1914. Revised Edition, with the Imprimatur of His Eminence Cardinal Gibbons. Baltimore: John Murphy Company, 1916. p. 167.
- Rev. Richard Stanton. A Menology of England and Wales, or, Brief Memorials of the Ancient British and English Saints Arranged According to the Calendar, Together with the Martyrs of the 16th and 17th Centuries. London: Burns & Oates, 1892. pp. 261–263.

Greek Sources

- Great Synaxaristes: (in Greek) 8 ΙΟΥΝΙΟΥ. ΜΕΓΑΣ ΣΥΝΑΞΑΡΙΣΤΗΣ.
- (in Greek) Συναξαριστής. 8 Ιουνίου. ECCLESIA.GR. (H ΕΚΚΛΗΣΙΑ ΤΗΣ ΕΛΛΑΔΟΣ).
- (in Greek) 08/06/2017. Ορθόδοξος Συναξαριστής.

Russian Sources

- (in Russian) 21 июня (8 июня). Православная Энциклопедия под редакцией Патриарха Московского и всея Руси Кирилла (электронная версия). (Orthodox Encyclopedia - Pravenc.ru).
- (in Russian) 8 июня по старому стилю / 21 июня по новому стилю. Русская Православная Церковь - Православный церковный календарь на 2016 год.
- (in Russian) 8 июня (ст.ст.) 21 июня 2014 (нов. ст.). Русская Православная Церковь Отдел внешних церковных связей. (DECR).
