= Les Vies des Saints de Bretagne =

Les Vies des Saints de Bretagne (Breton: Buhez Sent Breizh) is a book by Guy Alexis Lobineau, O.S.B. It was published in Rennes in 1725.

It describes several saints of Brittany, and their feast days. These include the following individuals, listed by feast day:

== June ==
- 21 - Aaron of Aleth
- 22 - Aaron of Aleth
