= May 26 (Eastern Orthodox liturgics) =

Day in the Eastern Orthodox liturgical calendar

Eastern Orthodox liturgical calendar
May 25	May 26	May 27
May 26 O.S. ≍ June 8 N.S. May 26 N.S ≍ May 13 O.S.

An Eastern Orthodox cross

May 26 in Eastern Orthodox liturgical calendars is a feast day and a day of commemoration of saints and martyrs. Although some Orthodox churches use the Revised Julian Calendar and others use the traditional Julian calendar, the fixed commemorations for their respective May 26 are broadly the same, no matter which calendar is used. (Note: Despite the dates being the same, the days to which they refer typically differ by 13 days. The notation Old Style or O.S. is sometimes used to indicate a date in the traditional Julian Calendar (the "Old Calendar"). The notation New Style or N.S. indicates a date in the Revised Julian calendar (the "New Calendar").)

== Saints ==
- Apostles Carpus and Alphaeus of the Seventy Apostles (1st century)
- Martyrs Abercius and Helen, children of Apostle Alphaeus (1st century) (Note: According to the Synaxaristes, Abercius was martyred by being exposed naked to bees, and Helena by stoning.)
- Martyr Julius, Roman soldier, by beheading, at Dorostolum in Mysia (Asia Minor) (302) (Note: According to the Synaxaristes, the holy martyr Julius was associated with Martyrs Pasicrates, Valentine, and Hesychius, who were martyred earlier (April 24).)
- Saint Synesius, Bishop of Karpasia in Cyprus, Wonderworker (c. 5th century) (Note: In the early Byzantine period, Karpasia belonged ecclesiastically to the Bishopric of Salamis. However, by the end of the 4th century it was organized into an episcopal district which had its seat in the ancient city of Karpasia and having as its first bishop Saint Philon. According to the Synaxaristes, St. Synesius was raised to the Episcopal throne by St. Philo (Philon) the Wonderworker of Karpasia, Cyprus (lived 4th to 5th centuries).)
- Venerable John of Psichaita the Confessor, of Constantinople (c. 825) (Note: "The Monk John Psychantes the Confessor lived during the end of the 8th and beginning of the 9th century. In his youth he left the secular world and accepted monasticism in the Psukhanteia Lavra (in the suburbs of Constantinople). For his holy life and salvific exploits, the monk received from God the gift to cast out demons and to heal the sick. During this time there raged the heresy of the iconoclasts, and those venerating holy icons were subjected to persecution. They led away the Monk John for interrogation, where they put him under coercion to renounce the veneration of holy icons and to sign a renunciation. The monk in place of a renunciation denounced the persecutors, calling the emperor Leo Isauros (717-741) an heretic. For this they sent the monk into exile, where he died, having endured much distress from the iconoclasts.") (see also: May 7)

== Pre-Schism Western saints ==
- Hieromartyr Zacharias, Bishop of Vienne, suffered under Trajan (106)
- Hieromartyr Simitrius priest, and 22 other martyrs, who suffered under Antoninus Pius, at Rome (159) (Note: "A group of twenty-three martyrs in Rome, arrested while praying in the church of St. Praxedes and beheaded without trial.")
- Saint Eleutherius, Pope of Rome (189) (Note: According to the Roman Martyrology, St. Eleutherius, Pope and Martyr converted to the Christian faith many noble Romans. He sent Saints Damian and Fugatius to England, and they baptized King Lucius, his wife, and almost all his people. He was a Greek who became a deacon in Rome and succeeded St. Soterius as Pope in 175.)
- Saints Fugatius (Fagan) and Damian (Deruvian), sent by Pope Eleutherius to England to preach the Gospel (2nd century)
- Martyr Priscus, a Roman legionary officer, and a great multitude of other Christians of Besançon, near Auxerre (272) (Note: According to the Synaxaristes, their holy relics were later discovered by Saint Germanus of Auxerre, who dedicated a church in honour of the Holy Martyrs.)
- Martyrs Felicissimus, Heraclius, and Paulinus, at Todi in Umbria (303)
- Martyr Quadratus, a martyr in North Africa. (Note: "In Africa, St. Quadratus, martyr, on whose feast day St. Augustine preached a sermon.")
- Saint Bécán, a hermit near Cork in Ireland, founder of Kilbeggan, Westmeath (6th century)
- Saint Augustine of Canterbury, Evangelizer of England (605)
- Saint Oduvald, a noble who became a monk and later Abbot of Melrose Abbey in Scotland (698)
- Saint Regintrudis, fourth Abbess of Nonnberg Abbey near Salzburg in Austria (c. 740)
- Saint Guinizo, born in Spain, became a monk at Montecassino in Italy (c. 1050)

== Post-Schism Orthodox saints ==
- New Martyr Alexander of Thessalonica, the former Dervish, beheaded at Smyrna (1794)

=== New martyrs and confessors ===
- New Hieromartyrs Milan Banjac and Milan Golubovic, of Drvar, Serbia (1941-1945)

== Other commemorations ==
- Uncovering of the relics (1521) of Venerable Macarius, Abbot of Kolyazin (1483) (Note: See: (in Russian) Макарий Калязинский. Википедии. (Russian Wikipedia).)
- Translation of the relics (1534) of New Martyr George of Kratovo (George of Sofia) (1515) (see also: February 11 - Feast)
- The Icon of the Mother of God of Vladimir of Seligersk (16th century) (Note: "The Icon of the Mother of God of Seligersk-Vladimir was brought in the 16th century by the Monk Nil of Stolobensk (commemorated 7 December and 27 May) to the island of Seliger, where the saint pursued asceticism and founded a monastic hermitage (Nilov Monastery). The celebration for the Wonderworking Icon of the Mother of God is done also on 7 December.")
- Repose of Archimandrite George (Kapsanis) of Gregoriou Monastery (2014)

== Icon gallery ==
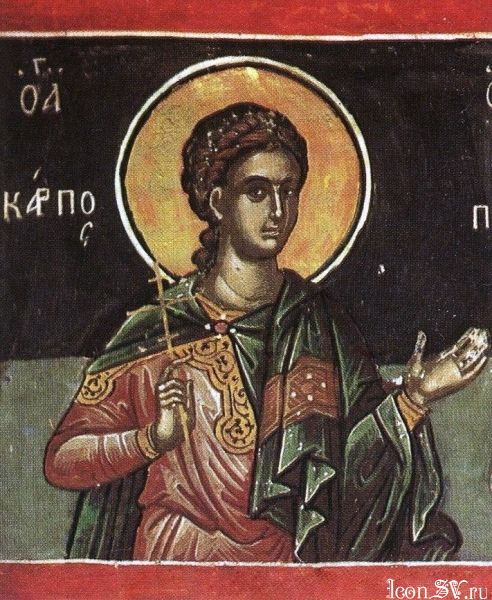
Apostle Carpus of Beroea.

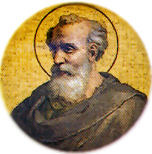
St. Eleutherius, Pope of Rome.

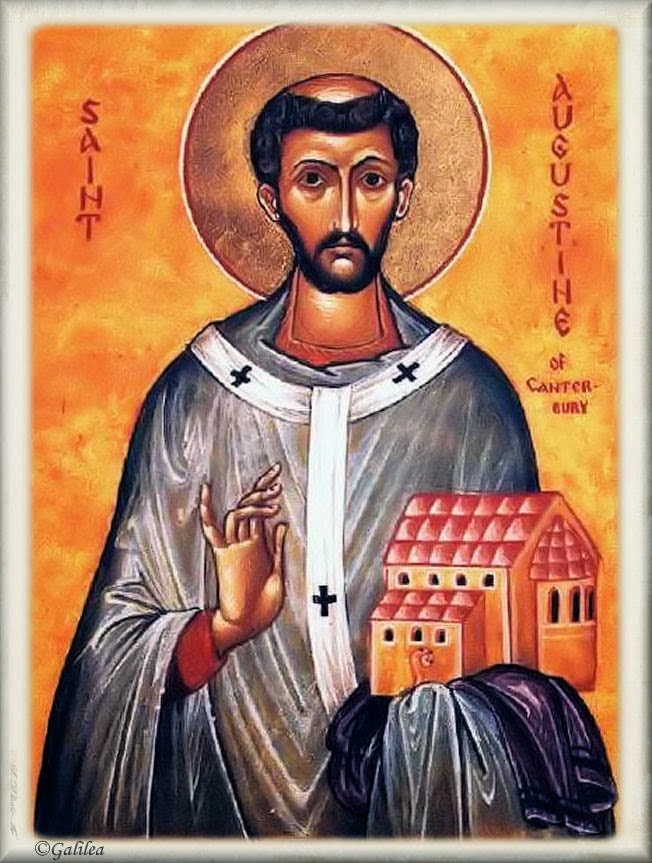
St. Augustine of Canterbury, Evangelizer of England.

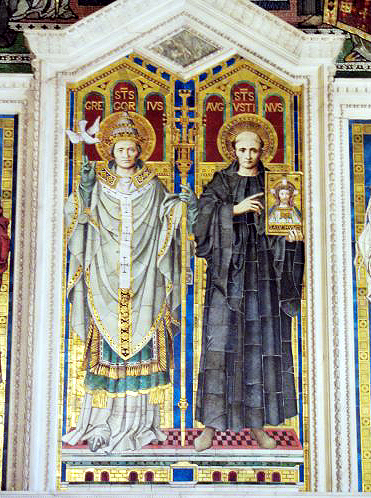
St. Gregory the Dialogist, Pope of Rome, with St. Augustine of Canterbury, Evangelizer of England.

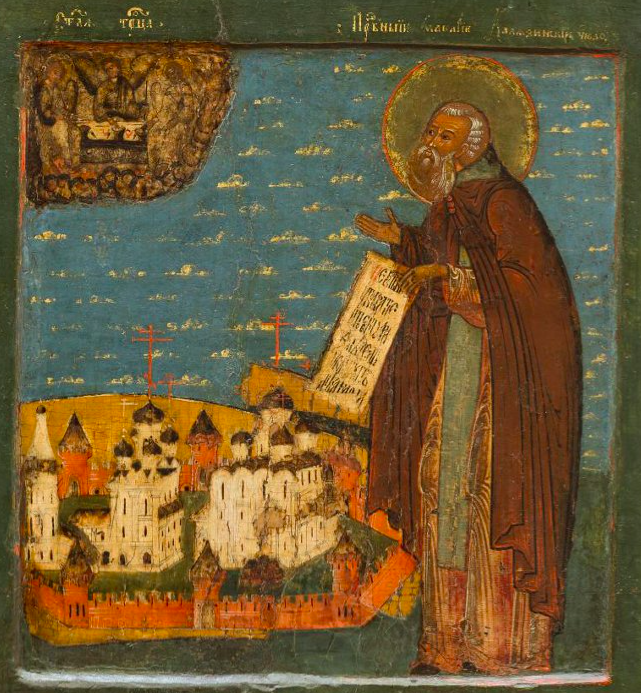
Venerable Macarius, Abbot of Kolyazin.

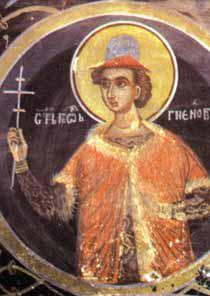
New Martyr George of Kratovo.

== Sources ==
- May 26/June 8. Orthodox Calendar (ORTHOCHRISTIAN.COM).
- June 8 / May 26. HOLY TRINITY RUSSIAN ORTHODOX CHURCH (A parish of the Patriarchate of Moscow).
- May 26. OCA - The Lives of the Saints.
- May 26. Latin Saints of the Orthodox Patriarchate of Rome.
- May 26. The Roman Martyrology.

Greek Sources

- Great Synaxaristes: (in Greek) 26 ΜΑΪΟΥ. ΜΕΓΑΣ ΣΥΝΑΞΑΡΙΣΤΗΣ.
- (in Greek) Συναξαριστής. 26 Μαΐου. ECCLESIA.GR. (H ΕΚΚΛΗΣΙΑ ΤΗΣ ΕΛΛΑΔΟΣ).

Russian Sources

- (in Russian) 8 июня (26 мая). Православная Энциклопедия под редакцией Патриарха Московского и всея Руси Кирилла (электронная версия). (Orthodox Encyclopedia - Pravenc.ru).
- (in Russian) 26 мая (ст.ст.) 8 июня 2013 (нов. ст.). Русская Православная Церковь Отдел внешних церковных связей. (DECR).
