= Saint-Aaron =

Former commune in France

Coordinates: 48°31′N 2°29′W

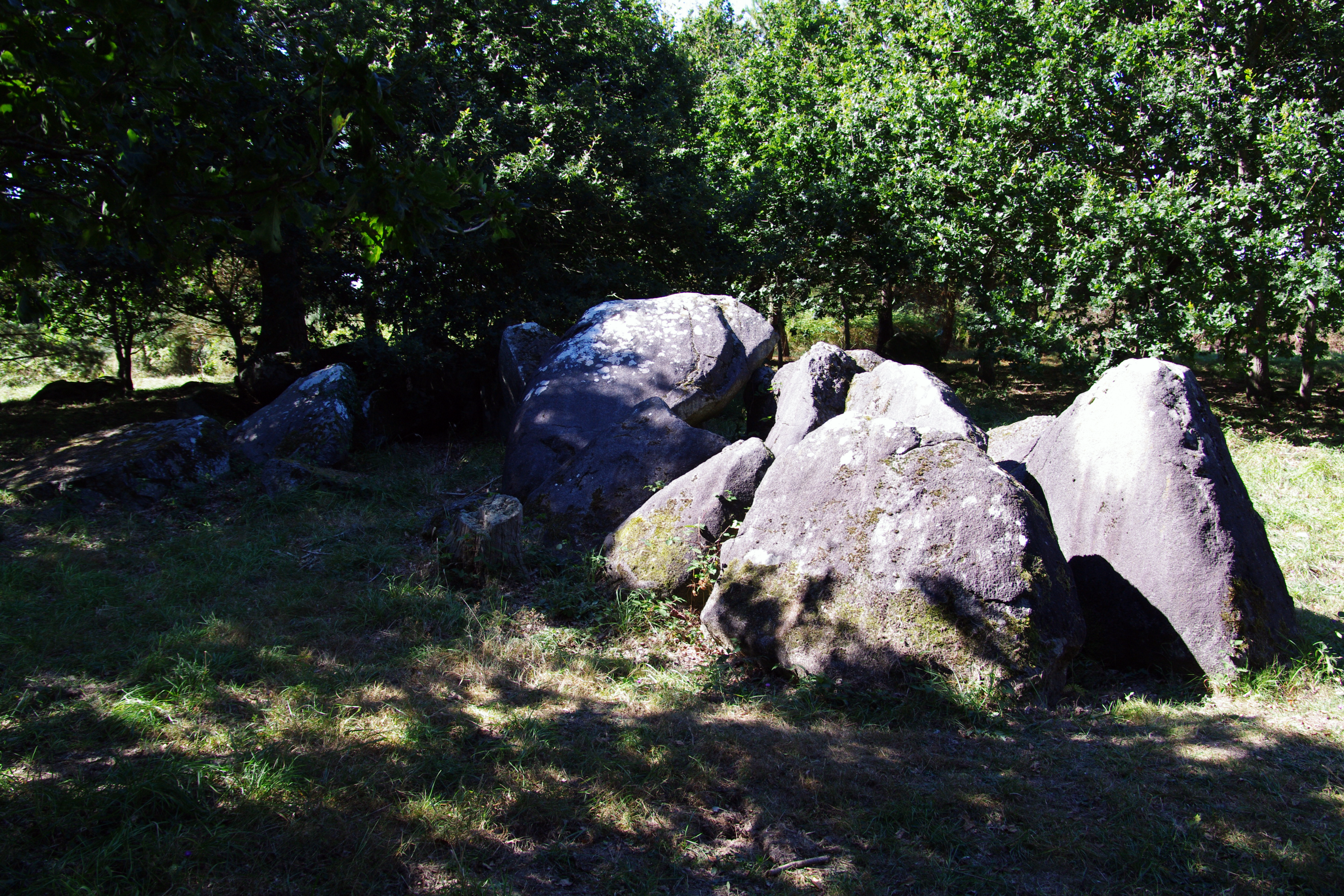
Allée chene hut aaron

Saint-Aaron (French pronunciation: [sɛ̃t‿aʁɔ̃]; Breton: Sant-Aaron) is a village in the commune of Lamballe, in Brittany, a region of France. Having originally been settled by the Celtic Bretons, it is named after the Celtic Saint Aaron of Aleth, who was born somewhere in Wales or perhaps Brittany. Saint-Aaron is 5 km northeast of Lamballe town centre, and 20 km east of Saint-Brieuc.
