= Dolikha =

Ancient city in Syria

Dolikha (today Dülük) is an ancient and small episcopal city located in Commagene, northern Syria, forty-one miles from Samosata (now Samsat), in the province of Asia Minor. It was the scene of the murder of St. Eusebius of Samosata c. 379.
