= Kalliopi of Rome =

Christian saint

Saint Kalliopi

Martyr
- Born: Early 3rd Century AD; Roman Empire
- Died: c. 250; Roman Empire
- Venerated in: Eastern Orthodox Church, Roman Catholic Church
- Feast: June 8
- Attributes: hot iron pressed to her breast

Kalliopi (Calliope) was a Christian saint of the third century AD. She was executed in 250, near the beginning of Emperor Decius' violent suppression of Christians within the Roman Empire.

== Kalliopi's martyrdom according to Church tradition ==
By the age of twenty-one (by third century standards a ripe age), Kalliope had already passed the age at which most girls marry, having no social prospects. She instead spent her days dedicated to her religion, with little thought to social life. For a time, she had been deemed not ready for marriage even though she met the criteria for it and was considered overall compliant. When at last she became eligible, many suitors asked for her hand. One pagan suitor sent word that were she to reject him in favor of another, especially a Christian, he would see to it that the pagan authorities would carry out their form of justice. Kalliopi did not hesitate to not only deny this suitor, but make it plain that she would not marry him even if he were a Christian—such a conversion, she said, could not be reliably authentic.

This put her at further odds with the Romans who saw her as rebellious, in addition to being a Christian in a pagan land. The spurned suitor arranged for her to be brought before a magistrate, where she was accused of a variety of crimes ranging from a mockery of the pagan faith to treason against the state. According to tradition, the suitor paid a parade of witnesses to testify against Kalliope in order to destroy her reputation. She was deemed guilty, and the rejected suitor stepped forth to offer a withdrawal of the charges against her if she would disavow Christ and become his pagan bride. The alternative was torture, and upon further refusal death.

Taken to the public square, she was bound to the post and mercilessly flogged until her clothing and flesh were in tatters. Her beautiful face was scarred with branding irons and salt was poured into her open wounds, and while the breath of life was still within her she was told to disavow Christ. When she persisted in the faith she was beheaded.

== Veneration ==
Kalliopi is venerated in the Eastern Orthodox Church and Roman Catholic Church. She is pictured in art with a hot iron pressed to her breast, emblematic of the branding that she is supposed to have suffered before death. Her feast is celebrated on June 8.

== Sources ==
- St. Calliope at Catholic Online
- Saint of the Day, June 8: Calliope at SaintPatrickDC.org
