= Carpus of Beroea =

Biblical figure in Christianity

Saint Carpus of Beroea
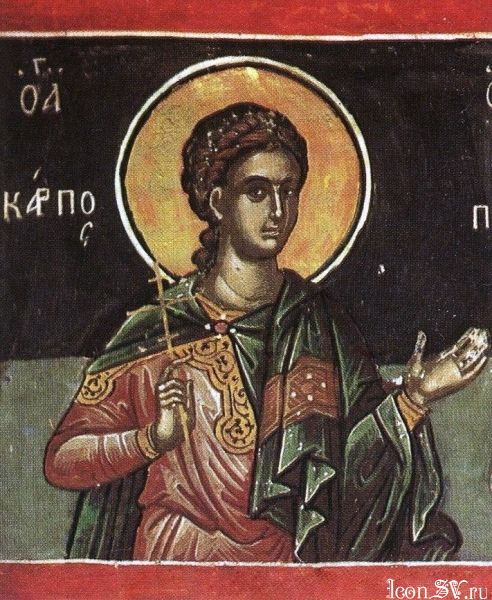

Apostle of the Seventy, Bishop of Beroea
- Honored in: Eastern Orthodox Church
- Feast: 26 May; 4 January

Carpus of Beroea (Greek: Κάρπος) of the Seventy Disciples is commemorated by the Church on 26 May with St. Alphaeus, and on 4 January with the rest of the Seventy Disciples.

In his second Epistle to Timothy (2 Timothy 4:13), Paul requests, "The phelonion that I left at Troas with Carpus, when thou comest, bring with thee, and the books." Carpus was bishop of Beroea (or Verria) in Macedonia.

== Hymns ==
Troparion (Tone 3)

O holy Apostle Carpus,
Entreat the merciful God,
To grant our souls forgiveness of transgressions.

Kontakion (Tone 4)

The Church possesses You as a shining star,
O Holy Apostle Carpus,
And is illumined by the multitude of your miracles.
Save those who honor in faith
Your holy memory.
