= German Brain Tumour Association =

German non-profit organisation

The Deutsche Hirntumorhilfe e.V. (German Brain Tumor Association) is a non-profit organisation based in Leipzig which provides information and support to brain tumor patients. Since its founding in 1998 more than 500 members from fourteen nations have been registered. The association is supported by patients and their family members as well as health professionals and scientists. A key goal is to seek a cure for brain tumors.

The Deutsche Hirntumorhilfe supports science and research especially in the field of neuro-oncology. According to its motto "Knowledge Creates Future", the association has a special interest in the advancement of scientific research. Apart from providing recent information about therapy standards and proceedings to brain tumor patients, the organisation supports neuro-oncological research projects and facilitates the international transfer of knowledge. The promotion of interdisciplinary cooperation of all the areas of expertise involved in the treatment of brain tumors is one of its major aims.

As a tribute to all brain tumor patients and their families the Deutsche Hirntumorhilfe announced the World Brain Tumor Day in 2000 as an international commemoration day. It is celebrated annually on 8 June.
