= June 9 (Eastern Orthodox liturgics) =

Day in the Eastern Orthodox liturgical calendar

Eastern Orthodox liturgical calendar
June 8	June 9	June 10
June 9 O.S. ≍ June 22 N.S. June 9 N.S ≍ May 27 O.S.

An Eastern Orthodox cross

June 9 in Eastern Orthodox liturgical calendars is a feast day and a day of commemoration of saints and martyrs. Although some Orthodox churches use the Revised Julian Calendar and others use the traditional Julian calendar, the fixed commemorations for their respective June 9 are broadly the same, no matter which calendar is used. (Note: Despite the dates being the same, the days to which they refer typically differ by 13 days. The notation Old Style or O.S. is sometimes used to indicate a date in the traditional Julian Calendar (the "Old Calendar"). The notation New Style or N.S. indicates a date in the Revised Julian calendar (the "New Calendar").)

== Saints ==
- Martyr Ananias, by the sword.
- Martyrs Diomedes, Orestes and Rodon. (Note: It is unclear where and when the holy martyrs struggled. However in Codex 1575 p. 112 in the Library of Paris, an acolouthia to them is recorded.)
- Nun-martyrs Thecla, Mariamne, Martha, Mary, and Enmatha, in Persia, by beheading (346)
- Saint Cyril of Alexandria, Archbishop of Alexandria (444) (Note: June 9 marks the translation of his relics.) (see also: January 18 )
- Venerable Julian, ascetic in Syria (370) (Note: "At Edessa, in Syria, St. Julian, a monk, whose memorable deeds have been related by the deacon St. Ephrem.")
- Hieromartyr Alexander, Bishop of Prusa.
- Holy Three Virgin-Martyrs of Chios, by the sword.
- Venerable Cyrus, monk, reposed in peace.

== Pre-Schism Western saints ==
- Saint Vincent of Agen, a deacon martyred by pagans at Agen in Gascony in France (c. 292)
- Martyrs Primus and Felician, two elderly brothers beheaded under Diocletian on the Via Nomentana in Rome (c. 297) (Note: In 640 Pope Theodore I transferred their relics to the Church of St Stephen in Rome.) (Note: "AT Rome, on Mount Cælius, the birthday of the holy martyrs Primus and Felician, under the emperors Diocletian and Maximian. These glorious martyrs lived long in the service of the Lord, and endured sometimes together, sometimes separately, various cruel torments. They were finally beheaded by Promotus, governor of Nomentum, and thus happily ended their combat.")
- Venerable Maximian of Syracuse (O.S.B.), Bishop of Syracuse (594) (Note: Born in Sicily, he became a monk at St Andrew's on the Coelian Hill in Rome with St Gregory the Great. He served as papal ambassador in Constantinople. Recalled to Rome, he finally became Bishop of Syracuse.) (Note: "At Syracuse, the bishop St. Maximian, who is frequently mentioned by Pope St. Gregory.")
- Venerable Columba of Iona, Enlightener of Caledonia (Scotland), founder of Iona Abbey, Confessor (597) (Note: Born in Garton in Co. Donegal, he became a monk at Glasnevin and was ordained priest. The rest of his life was spent founding monasteries and churches, in Ireland and Scotland. On Whitsun Eve 563 he landed with twelve companions on the island of Iona (Holy Island), where he established the most famous of his monasteries, which became vital in the conversion of the Picts, the Scots and the Northern English. His biographer and successor, Adamnan, wrote that: 'He had the face of an angel, was of an excellent nature, polished in speech, holy in deed, great in counsel … loving to all'. His relics were transferred to Dunkeld in 849 and his 'Cathach', a copy of the Psalms in his own hand, still exists.)
- Venerable Baithéne mac Brénaind (Baithin, Comin, Cominus), disciple of St. Columba, Abbot, of Tiree and Iona (c. 600)
- Saint Cumianus (Cumian, Cummin), an Irish monk who became abbot of San Colombano di Bobbio (c. 736) (Note: Born in Ireland, he became a bishop. He visited Bobbio in Italy and lived there as a monk.)

== Post-Schism Orthodox saints ==
- Saint John of Shavta, Bishop of Gaenati (12th-13th century) (see also: April 1 )
- Venerable Cyril of White Lake, founder of White Lake (Belozersk) Monastery (1427)
- Venerable Alexander of Kushta, founder of the Kushta Monastery, Vologda (1439) (Note: See: (in Russian) Александр Куштский. Википе́дия. (Russian Wikipedia).)
- Righteous Cyril of Velsk (or Vazhe), Vologda, Wonderworker (15th century)
- Saint Alexis Mechev, Archpriest, of Moscow (1923) (Note: See: (in Russian) Мечёв, Алексей Алексеевич. Википе́дия. (Russian Wikipedia).)

== Other commemorations ==
- Repose of Hieromonk Vitaly of Valaam Monastery (1856)
- Uncovering of the relics (2005) of Saint Raphael (Sheychenko), monk of Old Agapia Monastery, (Note: (in Romanian) Manastirea Agapia Veche.) Moldavia (1957)

== Icon gallery ==
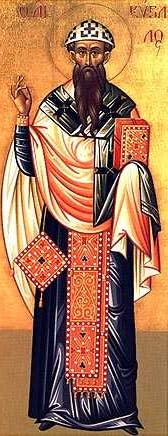
Saint Cyril of Alexandria, Archbishop of Alexandria.

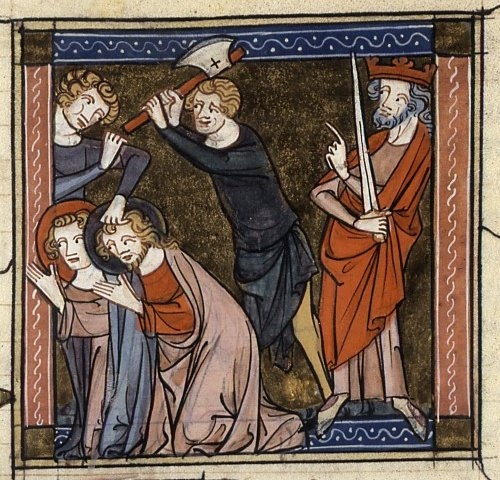
Martyrdom of Sts. Primus and Felician.

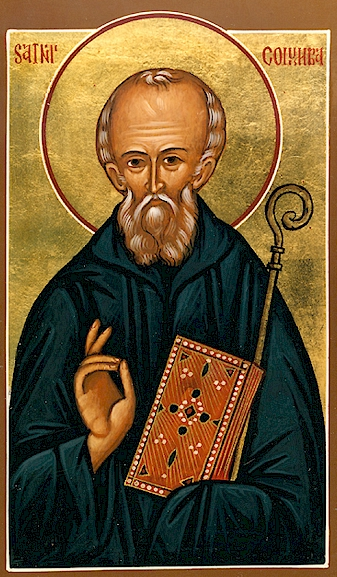
Venerable Columba of Iona.

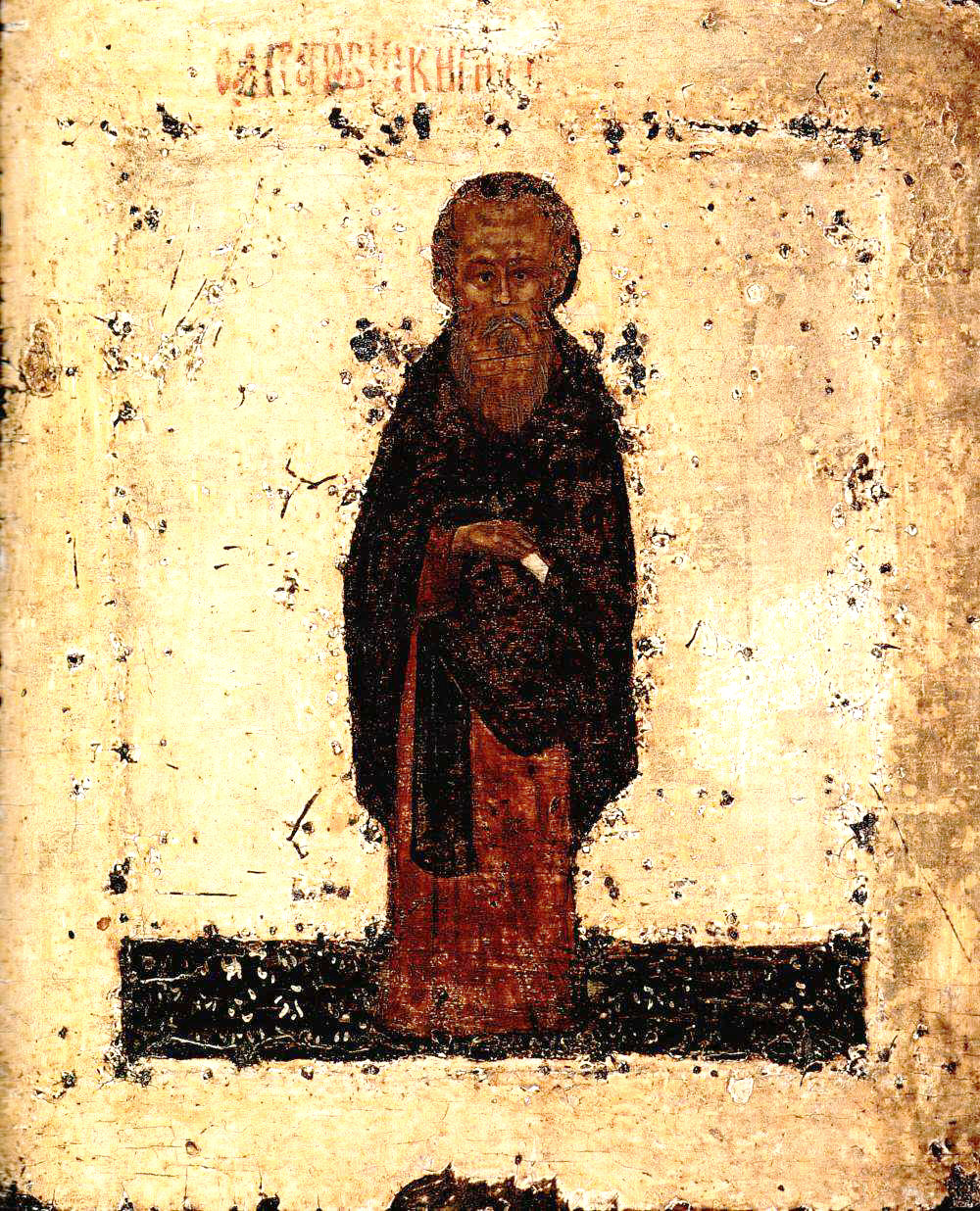
Venerable Cyril of White Lake.

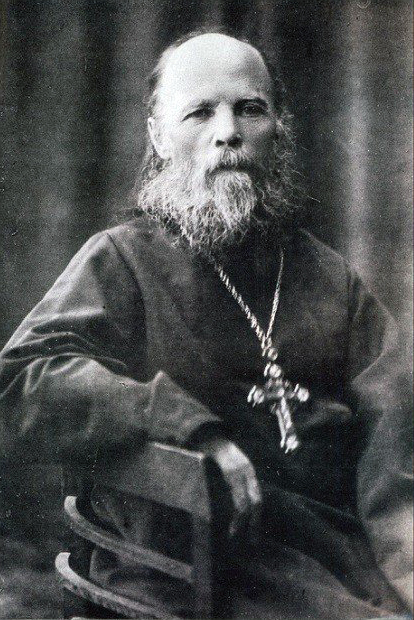
St. Alexis Mechev, Archpriest, of Moscow.

== Sources ==
- June 9/22. Orthodox Calendar (PRAVOSLAVIE.RU).
- June 22 / June 9. HOLY TRINITY RUSSIAN ORTHODOX CHURCH (A parish of the Patriarchate of Moscow).
- June 9. OCA - The Lives of the Saints.
- The Autonomous Orthodox Metropolia of Western Europe and the Americas (ROCOR). St. Hilarion Calendar of Saints for the year of our Lord 2004. St. Hilarion Press (Austin, TX). p. 42.
- The Ninth Day of the Month of June. Orthodoxy in China.
- June 9. Latin Saints of the Orthodox Patriarchate of Rome.
- The Roman Martyrology. Transl. by the Archbishop of Baltimore. Last Edition, According to the Copy Printed at Rome in 1914. Revised Edition, with the Imprimatur of His Eminence Cardinal Gibbons. Baltimore: John Murphy Company, 1916. p. 168.
- Rev. Richard Stanton. A Menology of England and Wales, or, Brief Memorials of the Ancient British and English Saints Arranged According to the Calendar, Together with the Martyrs of the 16th and 17th Centuries. London: Burns & Oates, 1892. pp. 263–264.

Greek Sources

- Great Synaxaristes: (in Greek) 9 ΙΟΥΝΙΟΥ. ΜΕΓΑΣ ΣΥΝΑΞΑΡΙΣΤΗΣ.
- (in Greek) Συναξαριστής. 9 Ιουνίου. ECCLESIA.GR. (H ΕΚΚΛΗΣΙΑ ΤΗΣ ΕΛΛΑΔΟΣ).
- (in Greek) 09/06/2017. Ορθόδοξος Συναξαριστής.

Russian Sources

- (in Russian) 22 июня (9 июня). Православная Энциклопедия под редакцией Патриарха Московского и всея Руси Кирилла (электронная версия). (Orthodox Encyclopedia - Pravenc.ru).
- (in Russian) 9 июня по старому стилю / 22 июня по новому стилю. Русская Православная Церковь - Православный церковный календарь на 2017 год.
- (in Russian) 9 июня (ст.ст.) 22 июня 2014 (нов. ст.). Русская Православная Церковь Отдел внешних церковных связей. (DECR).
