= Aaron of Aleth =

Saint

Saint Aaron of Aleth
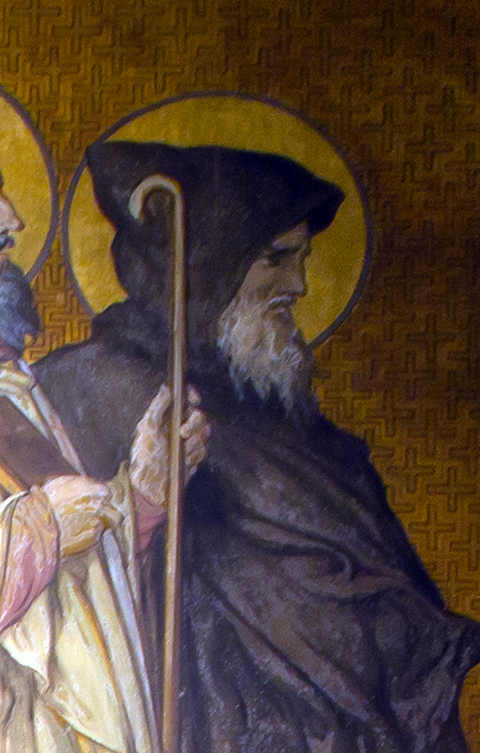
- Saint Aaron (detail) from Procession des saints de Bretagne by Alphonse Le Hénaff

Hermit and Abbot
- Born: Unknown; The British Isles, exact location unknown, perhaps Wales
- Died: After 552; Saint-Malo, Brittany, France
- Venerated in: Catholic Church; Eastern Orthodox Church
- Feast: 22 June (Elsewhere) 21 June (Saint Malo)

Aaron of Aleth (died after 552), also called Saint Aihran or Eran in Breton, was a hermit, monk and abbot at a monastery on Cézembre, a small island near Aleth, opposite Saint-Malo in Brittany, France. Some sources suggest he may have migrated from Celtic Britain to take up residence in Armorican Domnonia.

He lived alone near Lamballe and Pleumeur-Gautier, before finally settling on an island separated from the settlement of Aleth. He attracted many visitors while there, including Malo, it is said, in 544, and became their abbot. He died soon afterwards. Malo then succeeded to the spiritual rule of the district subsequently known as Saint-Malo, and was consecrated first Bishop of Aleth. Aaron's feast day is 21 June (at Saint-Malo) or 22 June (elsewhere). He is mentioned in Les Vies des Saints de Bretagne.

The town of Saint-Aaron in Lamballe, France is named after him.

== See also ==
- List of Catholic saints
- Julian Maunoir, "Apostle of Brittany"

== Sources ==
- This article incorporates text from a publication now in the public domain: Flood, William Henry Grattan (1910). "St. Machutus". In Herbermann, Charles (ed.). Catholic Encyclopedia. Vol. 9. New York: Robert Appleton Company.
- "St. Machutus" . Dictionary of National Biography. London: Smith, Elder & Co. 1885–1900. (contains a reference to Aaron)
- Catholic Forum
- Holweck, F. G. A Biographical Dictionary of the Saints. St. Louis, MO: B. Herder Book Co. (1924)
