= Eusebius of Samosata =

4th century Christian martyr

Saint Eusebius
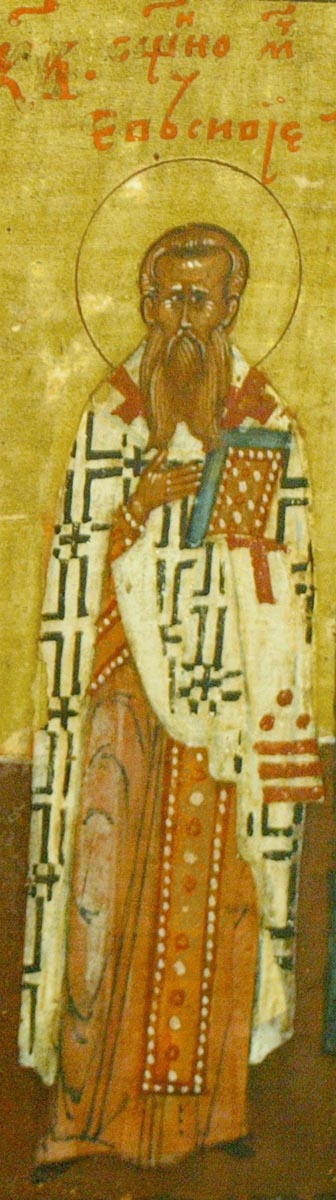

Bishop of Samosata and Martyr
- Died: Dolikha
- Venerated in: Roman Catholic Church; Eastern Orthodox Church
- Canonized: Pre-Congregation
- Feast: 21 June

Saint Eusebius of Samosata (died c. 379) was a Christian martyr and opponent of Arianism.

His feast day is June 21.

== Life ==
All that is definitely known of Eusebius is gathered from the letters of Basil the Great and of Gregory Nazianzen, and from some incidents in the "Ecclesiastical History" of Theodoret.

In 361 he became bishop of the ancient Syrian city of Samosata. Eusebius had been entrusted with the official record of the election (360) of Bishop St. Meletius of Antioch, who was supported by the Arian bishops, who were under the mistaken notion that he would prove sympathetic to their cause. When Meletius expounded his orthodoxy, the bishops persuaded the Roman emperor Constantius II, a staunch Arian, to extort the record from Eusebius and destroy it. Constantius threatened Eusebius with the loss of his right hand because he refused to surrender the record, but the threat was withdrawn when Eusebius offered both hands.

It was chiefly due to the concerted efforts of Eusebius and St. Gregory Nazianzen that, in 370, St. Basil was elected Archbishop of Cæsarea in Cappadocia.

During the persecution of orthodox Christians under Julian the Apostate, Eusebius travelled incognito through Syria, Palestine and Phoenicia disguised as a military officer, ordaining presbyters and deacons.

Orthodox Christians experienced a short respite during the brief reign of Jovian, but in 374 the emperor Valens, an Arian, banished Eusebius to Thrace, in the Balkan Peninsula. Bishop Eusebius asked the messenger to keep the imperial order confidential saying: “If the people should be apprized, such is their zeal for the faith, that they would rise in arms against you, and your death might be laid to my charge.” Although advanced in years, Eusebius left that evening.

After the Emperor's death in 378, Eusebius was restored to his see of Samosata. While in Dolikha to consecrate a bishop, he was killed after being struck on the head with a roof tile thrown by an Arian woman.
