= James Robbins =

James Robbins may refer to:

- James Robbins (journalist) (born 1954), BBC journalist
- James Robbins (shipbuilder) (died 1680), Danish shipbuilder
- James O. Robbins (executive) (died 2007), Cable television executive
- James S. Robbins (born 1962), American author, professor, and special assistant to the US Undersecretary of Defense
- James W. Robbins (1801–1879), American physician and botanist
- J. Robbins (born 1967), American rock musician
- Jimmy Robbins (born 1989), American singer-songwriter and producer

== See also ==
- James Robins, epidemiologist and biostatistician
