= Essery =

Essery is a surname. Notable people with the surname include:

- Bob Essery (1930–2021), British railway modeller and historian
- Emanuel Essery (1843–1937), Canadian lawyer and politician
- William Essery Snr, mayor of the City of Kensington and Norwood, South Australia (1922–1925)
- William Essery Jnr, mayor of the City of Kensington and Norwood, South Australia (1942–1946)

== See also ==
- Esser
