= Dasha Burns =

American TV journalist

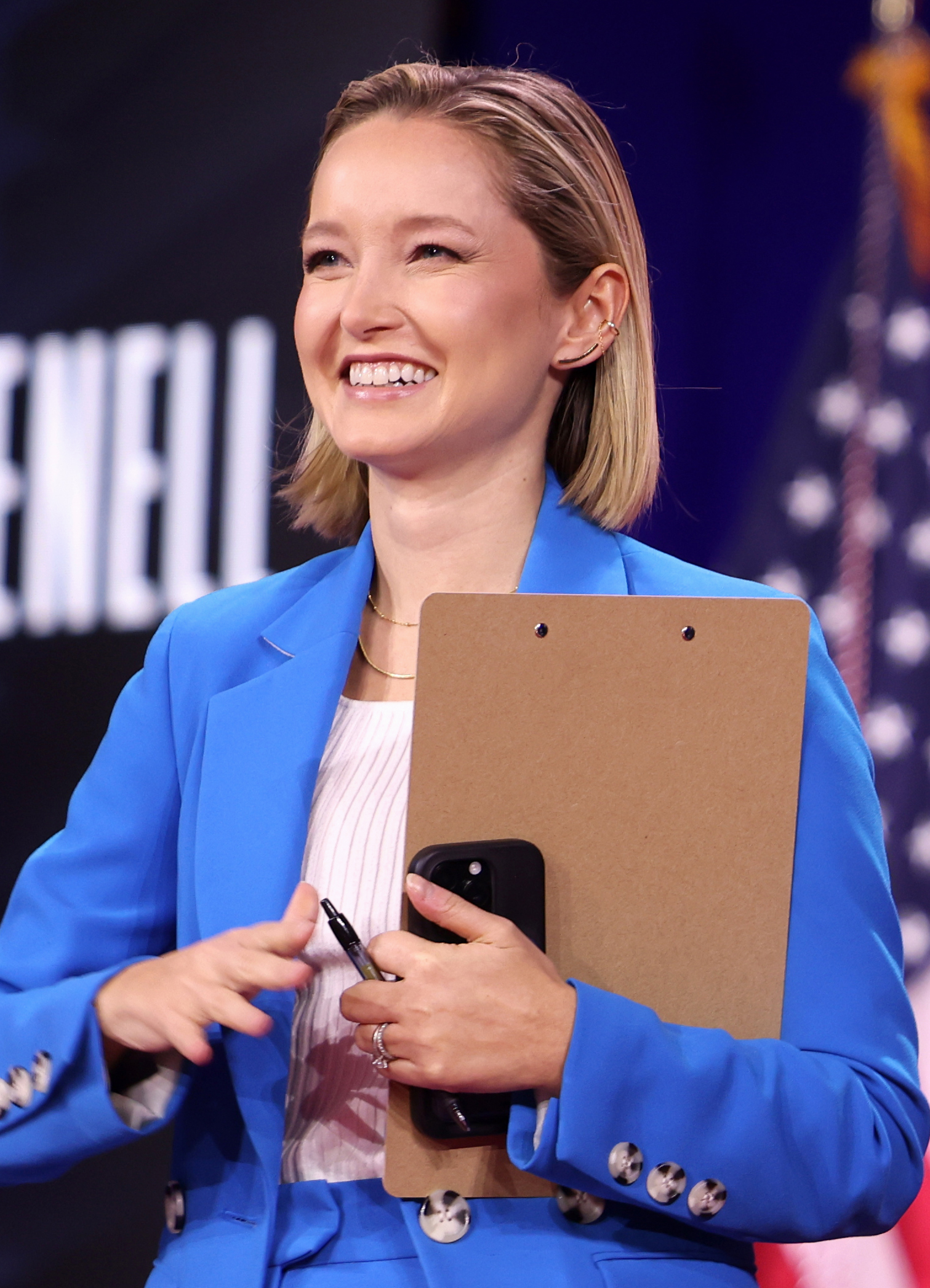
- Burns in 2025
- Born: Christina Burns; March 1, 1992 (age 34); Ukraine
- Education: University of California, Berkeley (BA)
- Occupation: Journalist
- Employers: CNN (2015–2016); NBC News (2016–2025); Politico (2025–present)
- Spouse: Ben Winkel (m. 2019)

Dasha Burns (born March 1, 1992) is an American journalist who has been the White House Bureau Chief for Politico since January 2025. She is also the host of "The Conversation with Dasha Burns" podcast, and in March 2026 was named POLITICO's Global Anchor. She is the inaugural host of Ceasefire, a C-SPAN program that features representatives of opposite parties discussing how to address the nation's problems. She previously worked as a national correspondent at NBC News from 2016 to 2025.

== Early life and education ==
Burns immigrated from Ukraine when she was eight years old, and grew up in San Diego. She graduated from La Costa Canyon High School in 2010 and went on to attend the University of California, Berkeley, graduating with a Bachelor of Arts degree in media studies and anthropology. In college she was a producer at CalTV, acted in university plays on campus, and served as a Matsui Center fellow at the United Nations Information Center Washington in 2014.

== Career ==
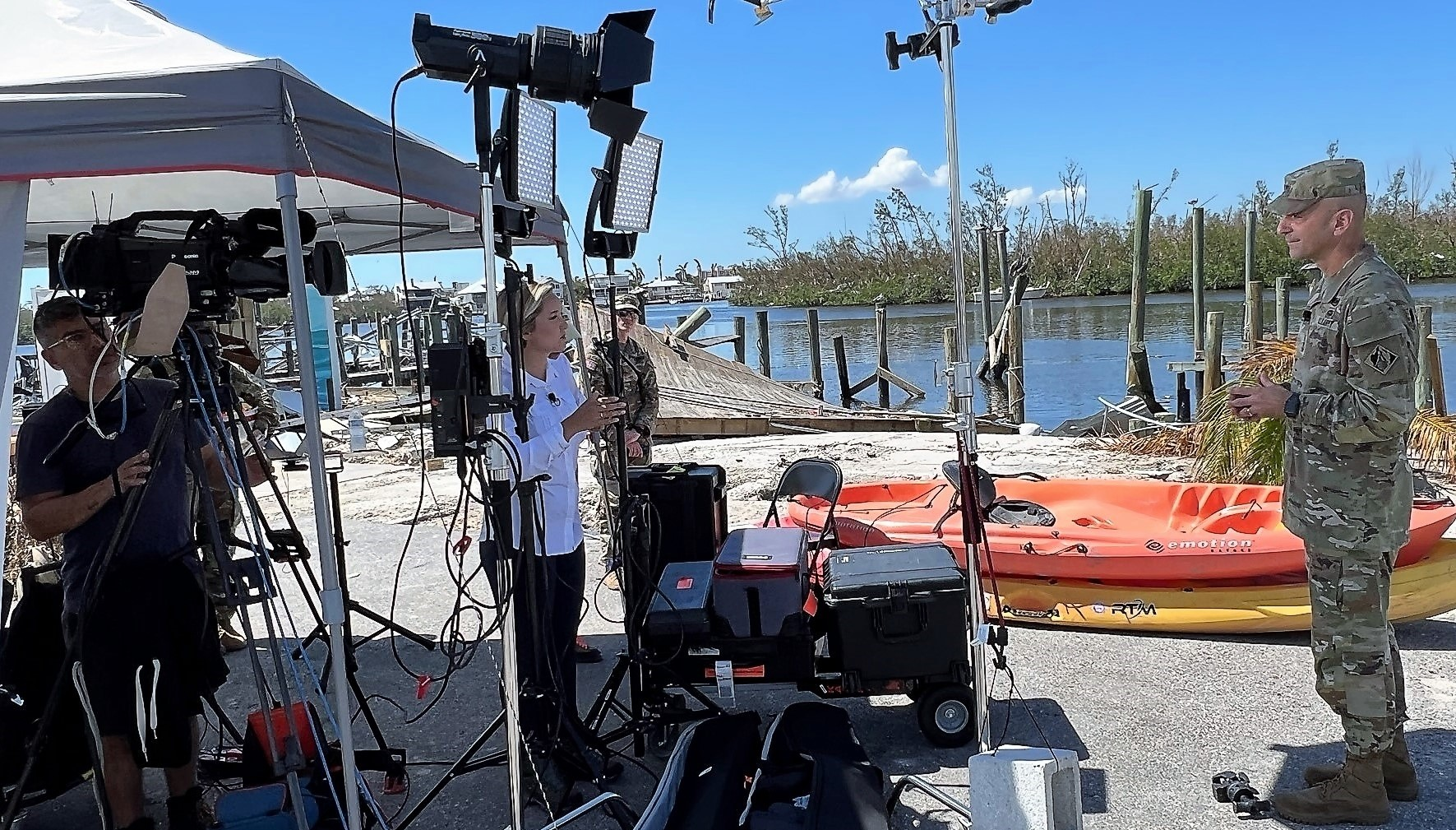
Burns interviews Scott Spellmon, commanding general of the U.S. Army Corps of Engineers in 2022

After graduating, through 2016, Burns worked as a media writer and strategist for a consulting agency, while writing opinion pieces for CNN.

From May 2016, Burns worked as an associate producer and then producer for the NBC television morning news and talk program Weekend Today. In March 2019 she became a television reporter for NBC News, reporting from the field. In February 2022, Burns was promoted from the County to County project, to correspondent focusing on the 2022 United States elections in Pennsylvania and Ohio.

In October 2022, Burns was the first journalist to have an in-depth face to face interview with Pennsylvania senatorial candidate John Fetterman since his stroke. National Review reported that Fetterman's wife, Gisele Barreto Fetterman, accused the reporter of ableism and said that Burns should face "consequences" for the interview. After Fetterman debated Republican candidate Mehmet Oz, several members of the media said that Burns was owed an apology from Gisele Fetterman and members of the media. She later interviewed Fetterman, after he was elected to the Senate, on C-SPAN's Ceasefire in December 2025 and for "The Conversation with Dasha Burns" in February 2026. Burns covered Ron DeSantis for NBC during his 2024 presidential campaign and then covered Donald Trump's campaign. In the latter role, she led NBC's coverage of the first assassination attempt on Trump and reported on-site from Butler, Pennsylvania.

=== POLITICO ===
In January 2025, Burns joined Politico as White House Bureau Chief. Her role also includes reporting for Politico's Playbook as the morning newsletter's Chief Correspondent and acting as co-host of the daily Playbook Podcast.

=== C-SPAN ===
In addition to her roles at Politico, Burns hosts the C-SPAN program Ceasefire. C-SPAN CEO Sam Feist has said the show will be a departure from the public affairs network's usual programming because it will focus on finding constructive solutions rather than emphasizing partisan differences. "At the end of the day, Americans and members of Congress agree more than they disagree," said Feist when he announced Burns as host. "We just never see that on television, and you rarely see that on the floor of Congress. And I wanted to change that."

== Personal life ==
In March and April 2020, Burns shared her experience of missing work due to contracting the COVID-19 virus.

In 2019, she married Ben Winkel.
