= List of Booknotes interviews first aired in 2004 =

Booknotes is an American television series on the C-SPAN network hosted by Brian Lamb, which originally aired from 1989 to 2004. The format of the show is a one-hour, one-on-one interview with a non-fiction author. The series was broadcast at 8 p.m. Eastern Time each Sunday night, and was the longest-running author interview program in U.S. broadcast history.

First broadcast (with link to transcript / video)	Author	Book	Subject matter
January 4, 2004	Brenda Wineapple	Hawthorne: A Life	Nathaniel Hawthorne
January 11, 2004	Walter Mears	Deadlines Past: Forty Years of Presidential Campaigning—A Reporter’s Story	Memoir/Autobiography; Journalism
January 18, 2004	John Seigenthaler	James K. Polk	James K. Polk
January 25, 2004	Nathaniel Philbrick	Sea of Glory: America's Voyage of Discovery, the U.S. Exploring Expedition, 1838–1842	Charles Wilkes; The United States Exploring Expedition
February 1, 2004	Abigail Thernstrom	No Excuses: Closing the Racial Gap in Learning	Education outcomes in the United States by race and other classifications
February 8, 2004	Nikki Giovanni	The Collected Poetry of Nikki Giovanni: 1968–1998	Poetry
February 15, 2004	Jon Meacham	Franklin & Winston: An Intimate Portrait of an Epic Friendship	Franklin D. Roosevelt; Winston Churchill; Special Relationship
February 22, 2004	Kenneth Silverman	Lightning Man: The Accursed Life of Samuel F.B. Morse	Samuel Morse
February 29, 2004	George Soros	The Bubble of American Supremacy: Correcting the Misuse of American Power	Foreign policy of the United States
March 7, 2004	Richard Perle	An End to Evil	The war on terror
March 14, 2004	John Dean	Warren G. Harding	Warren G. Harding
March 21, 2004	Constance Hays	The Real Thing: Truth and Power at the Coca-Cola Company	The Coca-Cola Company
March 28, 2004	Michael Dobbs	Saboteurs: The Nazi Raid on America	Operation Pastorius
April 4, 2004	Nicholas Capaldi	John Stuart Mill: A Biography	John Stuart Mill
April 11, 2004	Martin Marty	Martin Luther	Martin Luther
April 18, 2004	David Cay Johnston	Perfectly Legal: The Covert Campaign to Rig Our Tax System to Benefit the Super Rich – and Cheat Everyone Else	Taxation in the United States
April 25, 2004	Christopher Benson	Death of Innocence: The Story of the Hate Crime That Changed America	Emmett Till
May 2, 2004	Eric Lax	The Mold in Dr. Florey’s Coat: The Story of the Penicillin Miracle	Penicillin
May 9, 2004	Charles Ogletree	All Deliberate Speed: Reflections on the First Half-Century of Brown v. Board of Education	Brown v. Board of Education
May 16, 2004	John Lewis Gaddis	Surprise, Security, and the American Experience	Burning of Washington; Attack on Pearl Harbor; September 11 attacks
May 23, 2004	Joseph Califano	Inside: A Public and Private Life	Memoir/Autobiography
May 30, 2004	Thomas P.M. Barnett	The Pentagon's New Map: War and Peace in the Twenty-First Century	Grand strategy; Foreign policy of the United States
June 6, 2004	Amy Goodman	The Exception to the Rulers: Exposing Oily Politicians, War Profiteers, and the Media That Love Them	Political corruption; Corruption in the United States; Concentration of media ownership
June 13, 2004	Samuel Huntington	Who Are We? The Challenges to America's National Identity	Culture of the United States
June 20, 2004 and June 27, 2004	Simon Sebag Montefiore	Stalin: The Court of the Red Tsar	Joseph Stalin
July 4, 2004	Alyn Brodsky	Benjamin Rush: Patriot and Physician	Benjamin Rush
July 11, 2004	Robert Kurson	Shadow Divers: The True Adventure of Two Americans Who Risked Everything to Solve One of the Last Mysteries of World War II	Bill Nagle; John Chatterton; Underwater diving; German submarine U-869
July 18, 2004	Mark Perry	Grant and Twain: The Story of a Friendship That Changed America	Ulysses S. Grant; Mark Twain
July 25, 2004	Mario Cuomo	Why Lincoln Matters: Today More Than Ever	Abraham Lincoln
August 1, 2004	John McCain	Why Courage Matters: The Way to a Braver Life	Courage
August 8, 2004	Maureen Dowd	Bushworld: Enter at Your Own Risk	George W. Bush
August 15, 2004	Denny Hastert	Speaker: Lessons from 40 Years in Coaching and Politics	Memoir/Autobiography; The U.S. House of Representatives
August 22, 2004	Dorie McCullough Lawson	Posterity: Letters of Great Americans to Their Children	Letters
August 29, 2004	James Chace	1912: Wilson, Roosevelt, Taft & Debs—The Election That Changed the Country	Woodrow Wilson; Theodore Roosevelt; William Howard Taft; Eugene Debs; United States presidential election of 1912
September 5, 2004	Richard Viguerie	America's Right Turn: How Conservatives Used New and Alternative Media to Take Power	Conservatism in the United States; Advertising mail; Conservative talk radio
September 12, 2004	George McGovern	The Essential America: Our Founders and the Liberal Tradition	Modern liberalism in the United States; Founding Fathers of the United States
September 19, 2004	Bryan Burrough	Public Enemies: America's Greatest Crime Wave and the Birth of the FBI, 1933–34	Federal Bureau of Investigation; Category:American gangsters of the interwar period
September 26, 2004	Jack Matlock, Jr.	Reagan and Gorbachev: How the Cold War Ended	Ronald Reagan; Mikhail Gorbachev; Cold War (1985–1991)
October 3, 2004	John Ferling	Adams vs. Jefferson: The Tumultuous Election of 1800	John Adams; Thomas Jefferson; United States Presidential election of 1800
October 10, 2004	Hendrik Hertzberg	Politics: Observations and Arguments, 1966-2004	Politics of the United States
October 17, 2004	John McCaslin	Inside the Beltway: Offbeat Stories, Scoops and Shenanigans from Around the Nation's Capital	Politics of the United States; The Washington Times
October 24, 2004	Antony Beevor	The Mystery Of Olga Chekhova	Olga Chekhova
October 31, 2004	Chris Wallace	Character: Profiles in Presidential Courage	Courage; Whiskey Rebellion; Emancipation Proclamation; Pullman Strike; Second Bank of the United States; Impeachment of Andrew Johnson; Joint warfare in South Vietnam, 1963–1969 and The Great Society; Virginius Affair; Treaty of Portsmouth; The League of Nations; 1972 Nixon visit to China; Reagan Doctrine; Embargo Act of 1807; Lend-Lease; Berlin Airlift; Bay of Pigs Invasion; George W. Bush and the Iraq War
November 7, 2004	Winslow Wheeler	The Wastrels of Defense: How Congress Sabotages U.S. Security	Military budget of the United States
November 14, 2004	Stephen Greenblatt	Will in the World: How Shakespeare Became Shakespeare	William Shakespeare
November 21, 2004	Peter Charles Hoffer	Past Imperfect: Facts, Fictions, Fraud – American History from Bancroft and Parkman To Ambrose, Bellesiles, Ellis and Goodwin	Historiography; Historical method; Plagiarism; Stephen Ambrose; Michael Bellesiles; Joseph Ellis; Doris Kearns Goodwin
November 28, 2004	Peter Wallner	Franklin Pierce: New Hampshire's Favorite Son	Franklin Pierce
December 5, 2004	Mark Edmundson	Why Read?	Literature
