= Esser =

Esser is a surname. Notable people with the surname include:

- Esser (musician), English musician born Ben Esser
- Bernard Esser (1840–1901), American farmer
- Clarence Esser (1921–2009), American football player
- Dave Esser (born 1957), English footballer
- Dick Esser (1918–1979), Dutch field hockey player
- Dragutin Esser, French racing driver
- Eric Esser (born 1985), Dutch politician
- Franz Esser (1900–1982), German footballer
- Franz Joseph Esser (1891–1964), German painter
- George Esser (died 2006), American civil rights activist
- Hans Esser, German fencer
- Heinrich Esser (1818–1872), German classical violinist, composer and conductor
- Hermann Esser (1900–1981), German Nazi leader
- Hermin Esser (1928–2008), German tenor
- Irene Esser (born 1991), Venezuelan beauty pageant winner
- Jan F. Esser (1877–1946), Dutch plastic surgeon
- Janice Ferri Esser, American television writer
- Leo Esser (1907–unknown), German diver
- Luke Esser, American politician
- Mark Esser (1956–2025), American baseball player
- Markus Esser (born 1980), German hammer thrower
- Michael Esser (born 1987), German footballer
- Patrick J. Esser, American businessman
- Paul Esser (1913–1988), German actor and voice actor
- Piet Esser (1914–2004), Dutch sculptor
- Robin Esser (1935–2017), English newspaper executive and editor
- Roswitha Esser (born 1941), West German sprint canoeist
- Walter Esser (born 1945), German modern pentathlete
- Wilhelm Esser (1798–1854), German philosopher and classical philologist

== See also ==
- Esser Hill, mountain in Victoria Land, Antarctica
- Esser Bluff, cliff on Ross Island, Antarctica
- Elementary and Secondary School Emergency Relief Fund, also known as ESSER, a U.S. federal government relief program that provided $190 billion dollars to public K-12 schools in response to the COVID-19 pandemic.
