= Robert X. Browning =

American academic

Robert X Browning
- Citizenship: United States
- Education: Marquette University
- Known for: Director of C-SPAN Archives
- Scientific career
- Fields: Political science and communication
- Workplaces: Purdue University

Robert Xavier Browning is a professor at Purdue University and head of the C-SPAN Archives in West Lafayette, Indiana.

== Education and academic career ==
Browning graduated from Marquette University with a Bachelor of Science degree in 1972. He received a master's degree in public administration in 1977 and a master's degree in political science in 1978, both from the University of Wisconsin–Madison. In 1981, he was awarded his Ph.D., also from the University of Wisconsin–Madison, under the direction of Ira Sharkansky with the thesis "Political and economic predictors of policy outcomes: U.S. social welfare expenditures, 1947-1977".

In 1981, he became an assistant professor at Purdue University, where he is currently professor of communication/political science. At Purdue, Browning teaches courses related to American politics and the United States Congress.

== C-SPAN Archives ==
Browning is the founding director of the C-SPAN Archives. In 1986, with other Purdue professors, he developed the idea for an educational C-SPAN archive, which was approved in 1987 by David Caputo, then dean of Purdue's School of Humanities, Social Science and Education. In September 1987, the archive began cataloguing recordings of C-SPAN's coverage of Congress and other public affairs programming.

Browning assumed the title of Director of C-SPAN Archives in 1998, when the archives were transferred to C-SPAN's management. He facilitates educational access to C-SPAN's collection and oversees the archives, which are located in Purdue Research Park in West Lafayette, Indiana. By the time of the launch of the C-SPAN Video Library in 2010, Browning's team converted over 120,000 hours of recordings of C-SPAN programming from analog to digital. In 2011, the C-SPAN Video Library was awarded a Peabody Award.

== Publications ==
- Robert X Browning. Politics and Social Welfare Policy in the United States (1986) Knoxville: University of Tennessee Press ISBN 9780870494864.
- The Experiment in Government (1995, 2000) Robert X Browning and Barbara Hinckley (online course with video examples)

Browning has also published several peer-reviewed articles:

- "Public Affairs Video Archives: The C-SPAN Persian Gulf Collection". Film & History, 32:1/2, ed. by Peter Rollins, February/May 1992.
- (with Gary King) "Democratic Representation and Partisan Bias in Congressional Elections". American Political Science Review. December 1987.
- (with Gary King) "Seats, Votes, and Gerrymandering: Measuring Bias and Representation in Legislative Redistricting", Law and Policy, July 1987.
- (with William Shaffer) "Leaders and Followers in a Strong Party State". American Politics Quarterly, January 1987.
- "Presidents, Congress, and U.S. Social Welfare Expenditures, 1947-1977". American Journal of Political Science, May 1985.
