= Paul presidential campaign =

Ron Paul has unsuccessfully run for president three times; it may refer to:

- Ron Paul presidential campaign, 1988
- Ron Paul presidential campaign, 2008
- Ron Paul presidential campaign, 2012

Rand Paul has unsuccessfully run for president one time; it may refer to:

- Rand Paul 2016 presidential campaign
