= HDMS Sophia Amalia =

Ship of the Royal Dano-Norwegian Navy

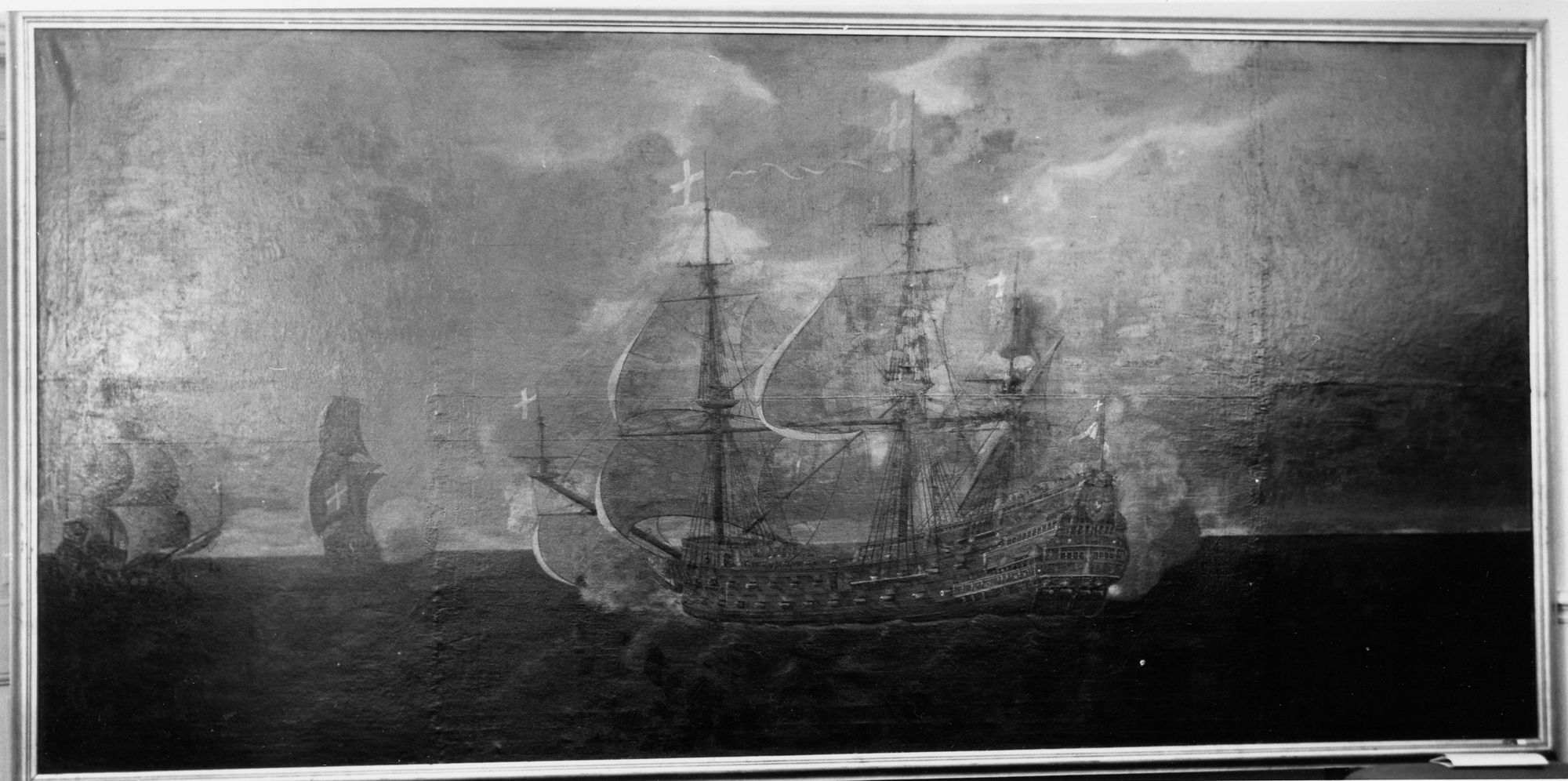

History
- Name: Sophia Amalia
- Namesake: Sophie Amalie of Brunswick-Lüneburg
- Launched: 1650
- Refit: 1673
- Fate: Scrapped, 1687

General characteristics
- Type: Ship of the line
- Displacement: 2,700–2,800 t (2,657–2,756 long tons)
- Length: 51.81 m (170 ft 0 in)
- Beam: 12.64 m (41 ft 6 in)
- Draught: 6.3 m (20 ft 8 in)
- Sail plan: Full-rigged ship
- Complement: 430-885
- Armament: 108 guns

The Sophia Amalia was a ship of the Royal Dano-Norwegian Navy named after Sophia Amalia, the wife of King Frederick III.

== Construction and design ==
The ship was built at Hovedøen in Christiania under the direction of English shipbuilder James Robbins and was launched in 1650. She was 51.8 meters long and at that time one of the largest naval vessels in the world. She was commissioned by King Christian IV specifically to surpass the British ship Sovereign of the Seas. The ship was manned by a crew of 680 and had an armament of 108 guns, surpassing Sovereign of the Seas by eight guns.

== Captains ==
- Rasmus Clemmensen 3 June 1667
- Simon Fochs de Boer May 1673
- Niels Juel August 1675 as head of vanguard in the Baltic Sea Fleet under Cort Adelaer with the admiral's flag raised in the Sophie Amalia
- Gustavus Meyer (junior lieutenant on board in 1684)

== Legacy ==
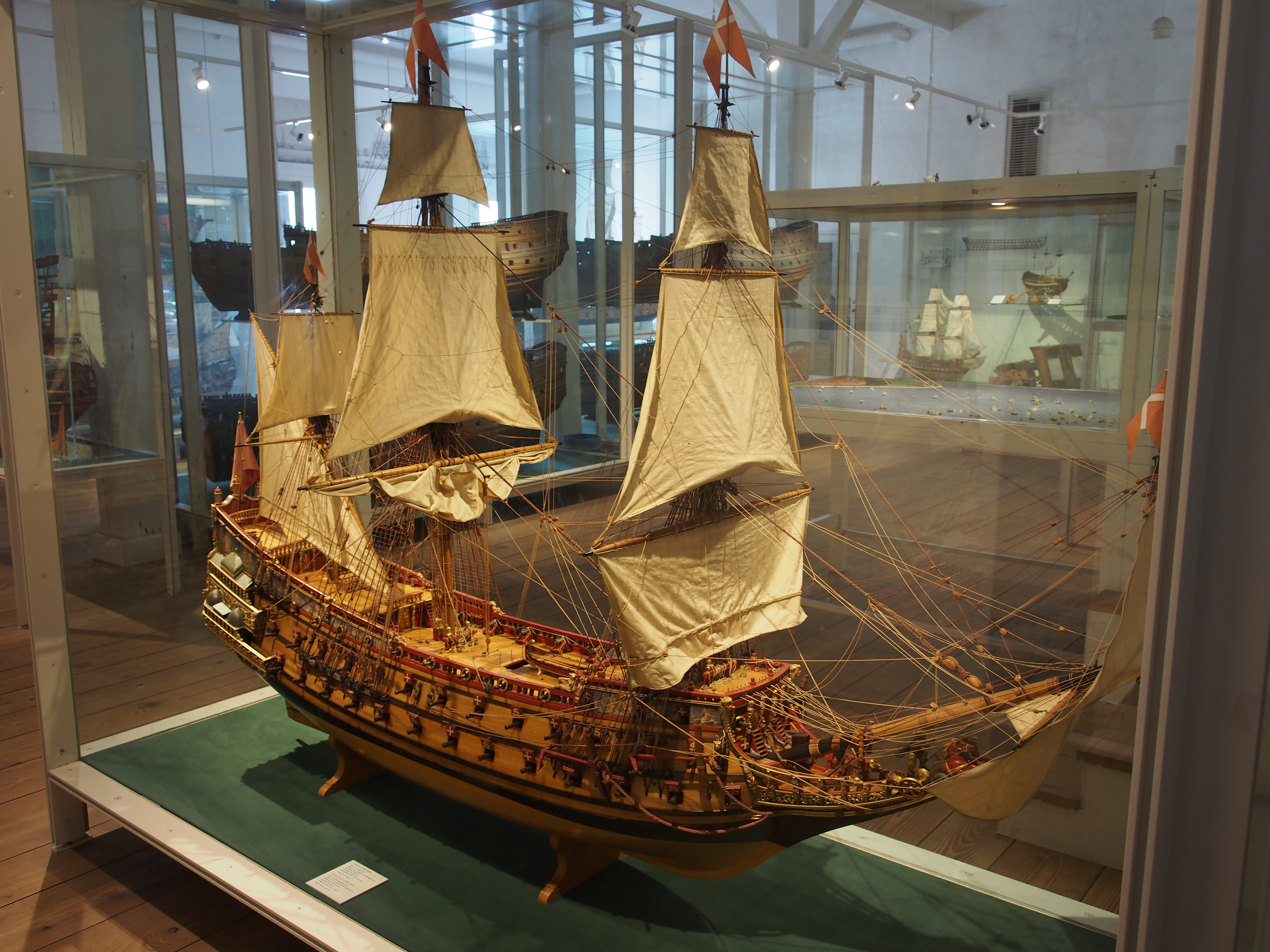
The model of Sophia Amalia in the Royal Danish Naval Museum.

A model of the ship is in the holdings of the Royal Danish Naval Museum.

HDMS Sophia Amalia is one of two ships depicted on what is believed to be the two oldest ship portraits of Danish ships. They are in the collections of Gavnø Castle.

== External links and citations ==
- Norwegian Defence web site
- Royal Danish Naval Museum – Skibregister
- (in Danish)T. A. Topsøe-Jensen og Emil Marquard (1935) "Officerer i den dansk-norske Søetat 1660-1814 og den danske Søetat 1814-1932“. Two volumes. Volume 1 and Volume 2
