= Law & Policy =

- Discipline: Law, public policy
- Language: English
- Edited by: Renée Cramer

Publication details
- Former names: Law & Policy Quarterly
- History: 1979-present
- Publisher: John Wiley & Sons and the University of Denver
- Frequency: Quarterly
- Impact factor: 1.432 (2020)

Standard abbreviations
- Bluebook: Law & Pol'y
- ISO 4: Law Policy

Indexing
- CODEN: LAPOE6
- ISSN: 0265-8240 (print); 1467-9930 (web)

Links
- Journal homepage; Online access; Online archive

Law & Policy is a quarterly peer-reviewed academic journal covering law and public policy worldwide. It was established in 1979 as Law & Policy Quarterly, obtaining its current name in 1984. It is published by John Wiley & Sons and the University of Denver and the editor-in-chief is Renée Cramer (Drake University). According to the Journal Citation Reports, the journal has a 2020 impact factor of 1.432.
