= C-SPAN =

American public-service television network

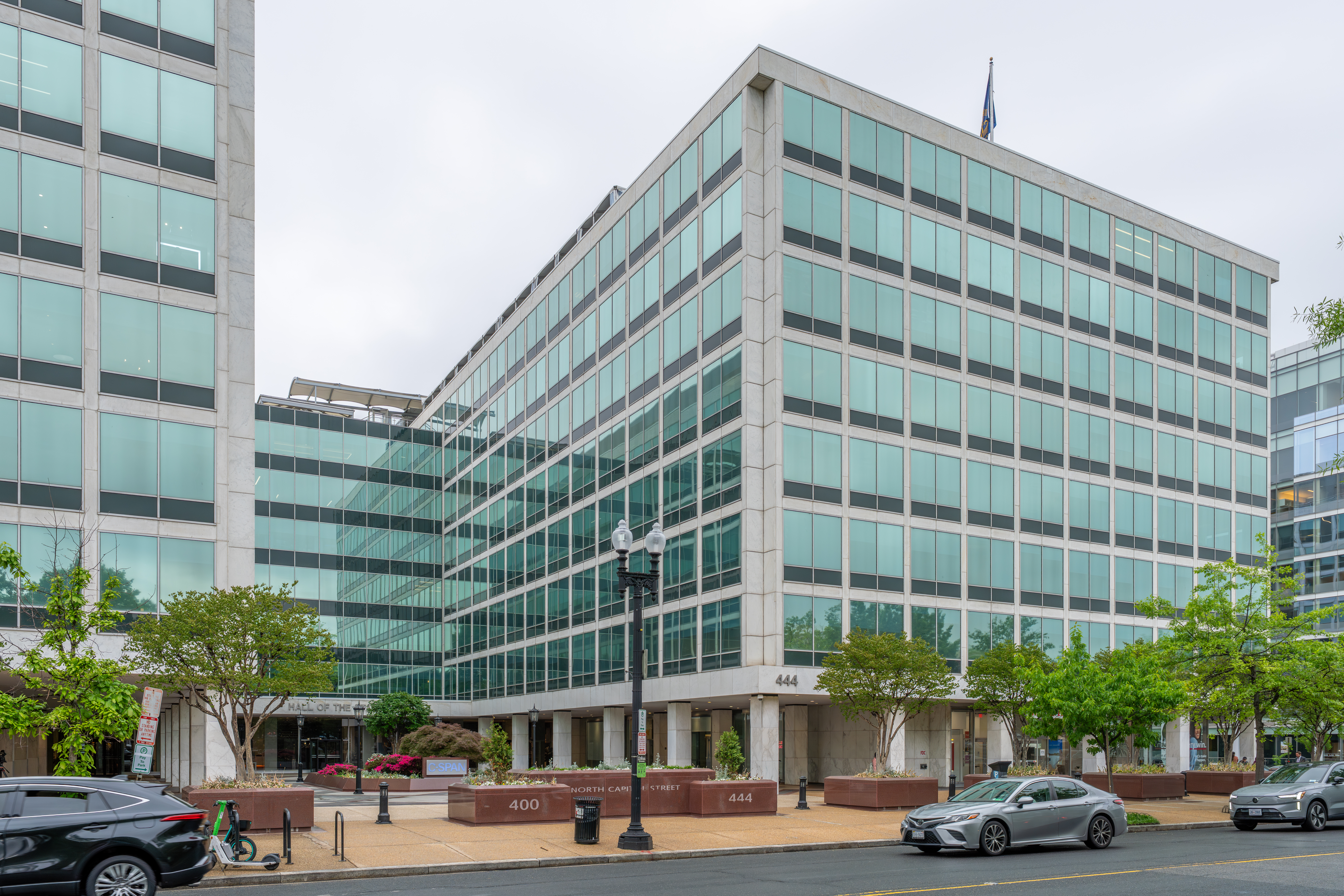
- Headquarters in Washington, D.C.
- Country: United States
- Broadcast area: Worldwide
- Headquarters: Capitol Hill, Washington, D.C.

Programming
- Language: English
- Picture format: 1080i (HDTV) (downscaled to letterboxed 480i for SDTV feeds)

Ownership
- Owner: National Cable Satellite Corporation
- Sister channels: C-SPAN2; C-SPAN3; C-SPAN Radio

History
- Launched: March 19, 1979; 47 years ago (C-SPAN); June 2, 1986; 40 years ago (C-SPAN2); January 22, 2001; 25 years ago (C-SPAN3)
- Founder: Brian Lamb

Links
- Website: www.c-span.org

Availability

Terrestrial
- WCSP-FM/HD (C-SPAN Radio): FM 90.1 MHz analog/HD Radio (Washington, D.C. / Baltimore)

Streaming media
- Official C-SPAN services: Live stream (Subscription to a TV service provider is required, except for C-SPAN Now)
- Service(s): Hulu + Live TV, YouTube TV
- C-SPAN Radio: Available via TuneIn

Cable-Satellite Public Affairs Network (C-SPAN /ˈsiːˌspæn/ SEE-span) is an American cable and satellite television network, created in 1979 by the cable television industry as a nonprofit public service. It televises proceedings of the United States federal government and other public affairs programming. C-SPAN is a private, nonprofit organization funded by its cable and satellite affiliates. It does not have advertisements on any of its television networks or radio stations, though their official website has banner advertisements, and streamed videos also have advertisements. The network operates independently; the cable industry and the U.S. Congress have no control over its programming content.

The C-SPAN network includes the television channels C-SPAN, focusing on the U.S. House of Representatives; C-SPAN2, focusing on the U.S. Senate; and C-SPAN3, airing other government hearings and related programming; the radio station WCSP-FM; and a group of websites which provide streaming media and program archives. C-SPAN's television channels are available to approximately 100 million cable and satellite households within the United States. WCSP-FM is broadcast on FM radio in Washington, D.C., and is available throughout the U.S. on SiriusXM via Internet streaming, TuneIn, and globally through iOS and Android apps.

The network televises U.S. political events, particularly live and "gavel-to-gavel" coverage of the U.S. Congress, as well as other major events worldwide. Coverage of political and policy events is unmoderated, providing the audience with unfiltered information about politics and government. Non-political coverage includes historical programming, programs dedicated to non-fiction books, and interview programs with noteworthy individuals associated with public policy.

== History ==
=== Development ===
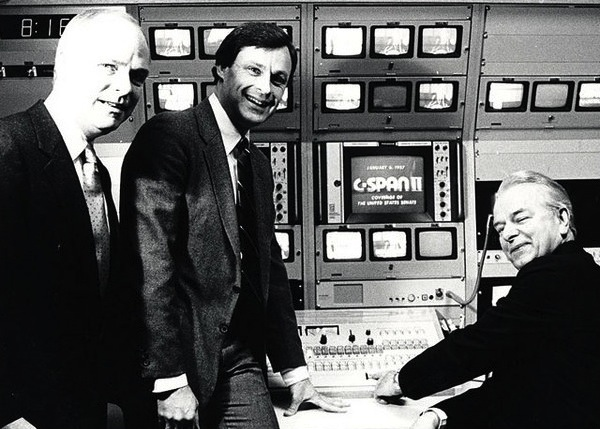
Sen. Robert Byrd (right), C-SPAN's founder Brian Lamb (left) and Paul FitzPatrick flip the switch for C-SPAN2 on June 2, 1986. FitzPatrick was C-SPAN president at the time.

Brian Lamb, C-SPAN's chairman and former chief executive officer, conceived C-SPAN in 1975 while working as the Washington, D.C., bureau chief of Cablevision. Cable television was a rapidly growing industry, and Lamb envisioned a non-profit network, financed by the cable industry, that televised Congressional sessions, public affairs events, and policy discussions. Bob Rosencrans, providing $25,000 of initial funding in 1979, and John D. Evans, providing wiring and access to the headend needed for the distribution of the C-SPAN signal, were among those who helped Lamb launch the network. At meetings with House of Representatives leadership, Lamb and Rosencrans promised that the network would be non-political, which helped override broadcast and local network resistance.

C-SPAN was launched on March 19, 1979, for the first televised session made available by the House of Representatives, beginning with a speech by then-Tennessee representative and later senator, Vice President, and presidential candidate Al Gore. Upon its debut, only 3.5 million homes were wired for C-SPAN, and the network had just three employees. For the first few years C-SPAN leased satellite time from the USA Network and had approximately 9 hours of daily programming. On February 1, 1982, C-SPAN launched its own transponder and expanded programming to 16 hours a day; the arrangement with the USA Network was discontinued two months later. C-SPAN began full-time operations on September 13, 1982.

=== Channel expansion and access ===
C-SPAN2 was launched on June 2, 1986, to cover Senate proceedings, and began full-time operations on January 5, 1987. The Senate had debated allowing television coverage for over two years, with Majority Leader Howard Baker introducing the first, failed, resolution to allow cameras onto the floor and Senator William L. Armstrong finally succeeding in televising Senate proceedings.

In 1992, Congress passed must-carry regulations, which required cable carriers to allocate spectrum to local broadcasters. This affected the availability of C-SPAN, especially C-SPAN2, in some areas as some providers chose to discontinue carriage of the channel altogether. Between 1993 and 1994, cable systems in 95 U.S. cities dropped or reduced broadcasts of C-SPAN and C-SPAN2. Viewers protested these decisions, and some communities, such as Eugene, Oregon and Alexandria, Virginia, were successful in restoring C-SPAN availability. C-SPAN availability was broadly restored when technological improvements expanded channel capacity and allowed for both mandatory stations and the C-SPAN networks to be broadcast.

C-SPAN3, began full-time operations on January 22, 2001. It airs public policy and government-related events on weekdays, historical programming on weeknights and weekends, and sometimes serves as an overflow channel for live programming conflicts on C-SPAN and C-SPAN2. C-SPAN3 is the successor of a digital channel called C-SPAN Extra, which was launched in the Washington, D.C., area in 1997, and televised live and recorded political events on weekdays. C-SPAN Radio also began operations in 1997, covering similar events as the television networks and often simulcasting their programming.

In 2010, C-SPAN began a transition to high definition telecasts, planned to take place over an 18-month period. The network provided C-SPAN and C-SPAN2 in high definition on June 1, 2010, and C-SPAN3 in July 2010.

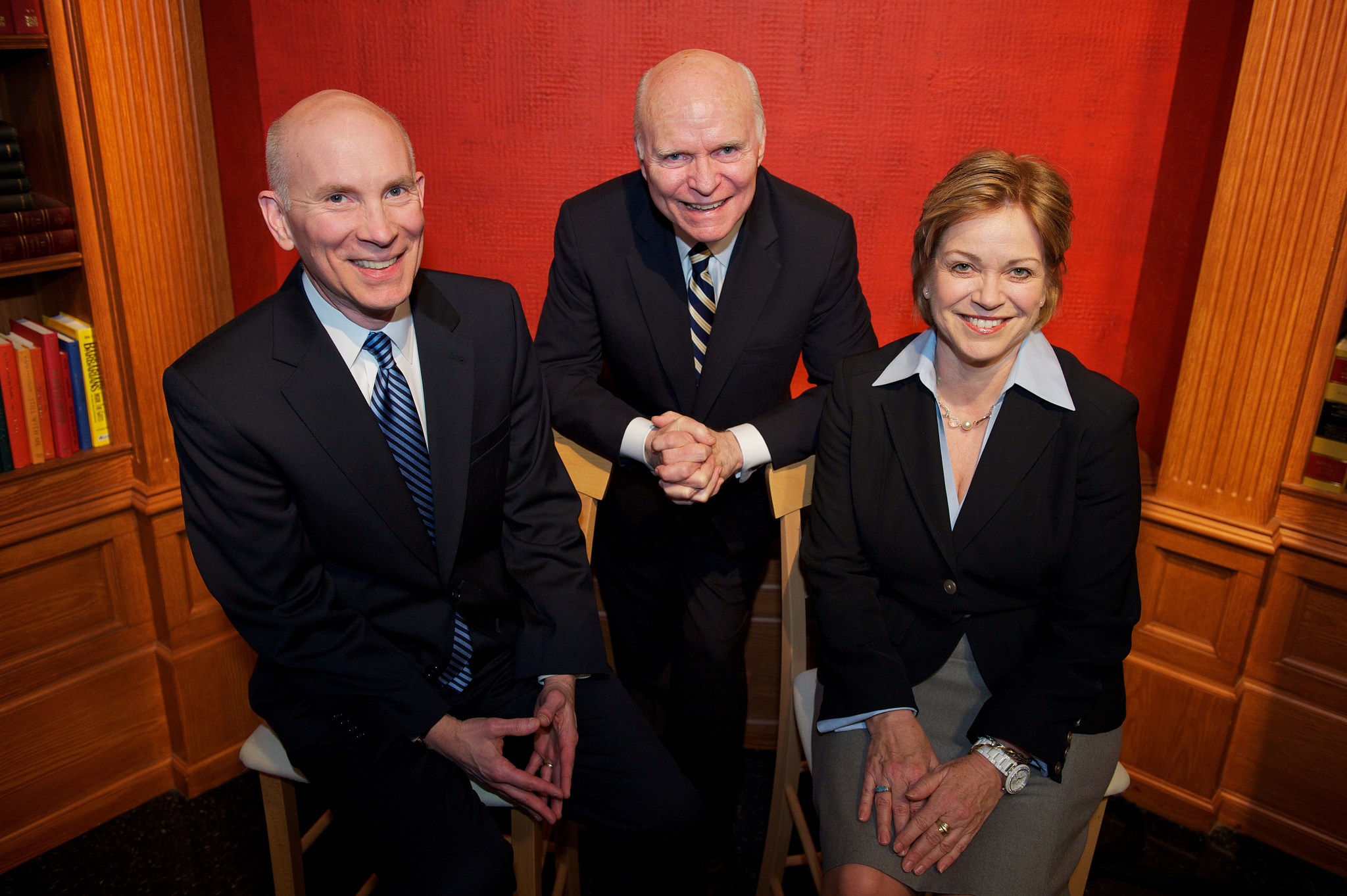
Founder Brian Lamb (center) in 2012 with co-CEOs Rob Kennedy (left) and Susan Swain (right)

In 2012, Lamb became executive chair of C-SPAN; Susan Swain and Robert Kennedy succeeded him as co-chief executive officers (CEO). Swain and Kennedy were succeeded as CEO by Sam Feist, head of CNN's Washington D.C. news bureau, in 2024. Lamb retired in 2024 and was succeeded as chair by Patrick Esser.

=== Online presence ===
In January 1997, C-SPAN began real-time streaming of C-SPAN and C-SPAN2 on its website. To cover the Democratic and Republican conventions and the presidential debates of 2008, C-SPAN created two standalone websites: the Convention Hub and the Debate Hub. C-span.org features further live programming such as committee hearings and speeches that are broadcast later in the day, after the House and Senate have left.

On January 12, 2017, the online feed for C-SPAN1 was interrupted and replaced by a feed from the Russian television network RT America for approximately 10 minutes. C-SPAN announced that they were troubleshooting the incident and were "operating under the assumption that it was an internal routing issue."

=== Camera access ===
C-SPAN broadcasts video feed, but does not control the placement or number of cameras on the House and Senate floor. Arguments over C-SPAN's camera in the House and Senate began as early as 1984, with a fight between Democrats and Republicans over camera angles. At the time C-SPAN only broadcast a shot of the person speaking. The Conservative Opportunity Society, led by Newt Gingrich, took advantage of this by delivering speeches to an empty chamber, at times referring to Democrats who were not actually there. Speaker Tip O'Neill, annoyed by the speeches, ordered the camera to display a wide-shot of the empty chamber without alerting the Republicans. The incident turned into a widely publicized argument between Gingrich and O'Neill.

After the 1984 incident, the House allowed both wide-angle shots and close-ups of the speaker until 1994, when they reverted to just close-up shots in an effort to make the House look "more dignified." The Senate, which had allowed cameras since 1987, had always only allowed close-ups.

In 1994, C-SPAN requested increased camera access from both the Senate and the House of Representatives, and for permission to bring their own cameras. They asked permission to pan for wide reaction shots, and install cameras for House-Senate conference committees and off-floor interviews, among other things. They also asked permission to have C-SPAN employees man the cameras instead of government employees. These requests were rejected. Speaker Dennis Hastert rejected similar requests in 1999, as well as incoming Speaker Nancy Pelosi in 2006. A December 2009 request to film healthcare negotiations was similarly denied.

In 2011, C-SPAN again requested to bring cameras onto the House floor. Incoming Speaker John Boehner rejected the request, though he did allow reporters on the floor for 'special events.'

On June 22 and 23, 2016, C-SPAN took video footage of the House floor from individual House representatives via streaming services Periscope and Facebook Live during a sit-in by House Democrats asking for a vote on gun control measures after the Orlando nightclub shooting. The sit-in was out of formal session and while the House was in official recess, so the existing House cameras could not be used to cover the event. These live streams violated House rules on use of personal devices on the floor, which C-SPAN noted through on-air disclaimers.

In January 2023, C-SPAN gained widespread attention for its broadcast of the Speaker of the House vote. As the House was not in session, C-SPAN had been given permission for its cameras to roam the House floor, and capture new angles in addition to the often-permitted wide-angle and speaker close-up. After Kevin McCarthy was confirmed as Speaker, camera permissions reverted to what had previously been permitted.

C-SPAN has requested televised camera access for arguments before the United States Supreme Court. Its requests have been denied or ignored by the court.

== Programming ==
=== Senate and House of Representatives ===
The C-SPAN network's core programming is live coverage of the U.S. House and Senate, with the C-SPAN channel emphasizing the United States House of Representatives. Between 1979 and May 2011, the network televised more than 24,246 hours of floor action. C-SPAN2, the first of the C-SPAN sister networks, provides uninterrupted live coverage of the United States Senate. With coverage of the House and Senate, viewers can track legislation as it moves through both bodies of Congress. Important debates in Congress that C-SPAN has covered live include the Persian Gulf conflict during 1991, and the House impeachment vote and Senate trial of President Bill Clinton in 1998 and 1999 as well as the impeachment proceedings of President Trump in 2019 and 2020. When the House or Senate are not in session, C-SPAN channels broadcast other public affairs programming and recordings of previous events.

=== Public affairs ===
The public affairs coverage on the C-SPAN networks other than the House and Senate floor debates is wide-ranging. C-SPAN is considered a useful source of information for journalists, lobbyists, educators and government officials as well as casual viewers interested in politics, due to its unedited coverage of political events. C-SPAN has been described by media observers as a "window into the world of Washington politics" and it characterizes its own mission as being "to provide public access to the political process". The networks cover U.S. political campaigns, including the Republican, Democratic, and Libertarian presidential nominating conventions in their entirety. Coverage of presidential campaign events are provided during the duration of the campaign, both by a weekly television program, Campaign, and at its dedicated campaign website. C-SPAN also covers midterm elections.

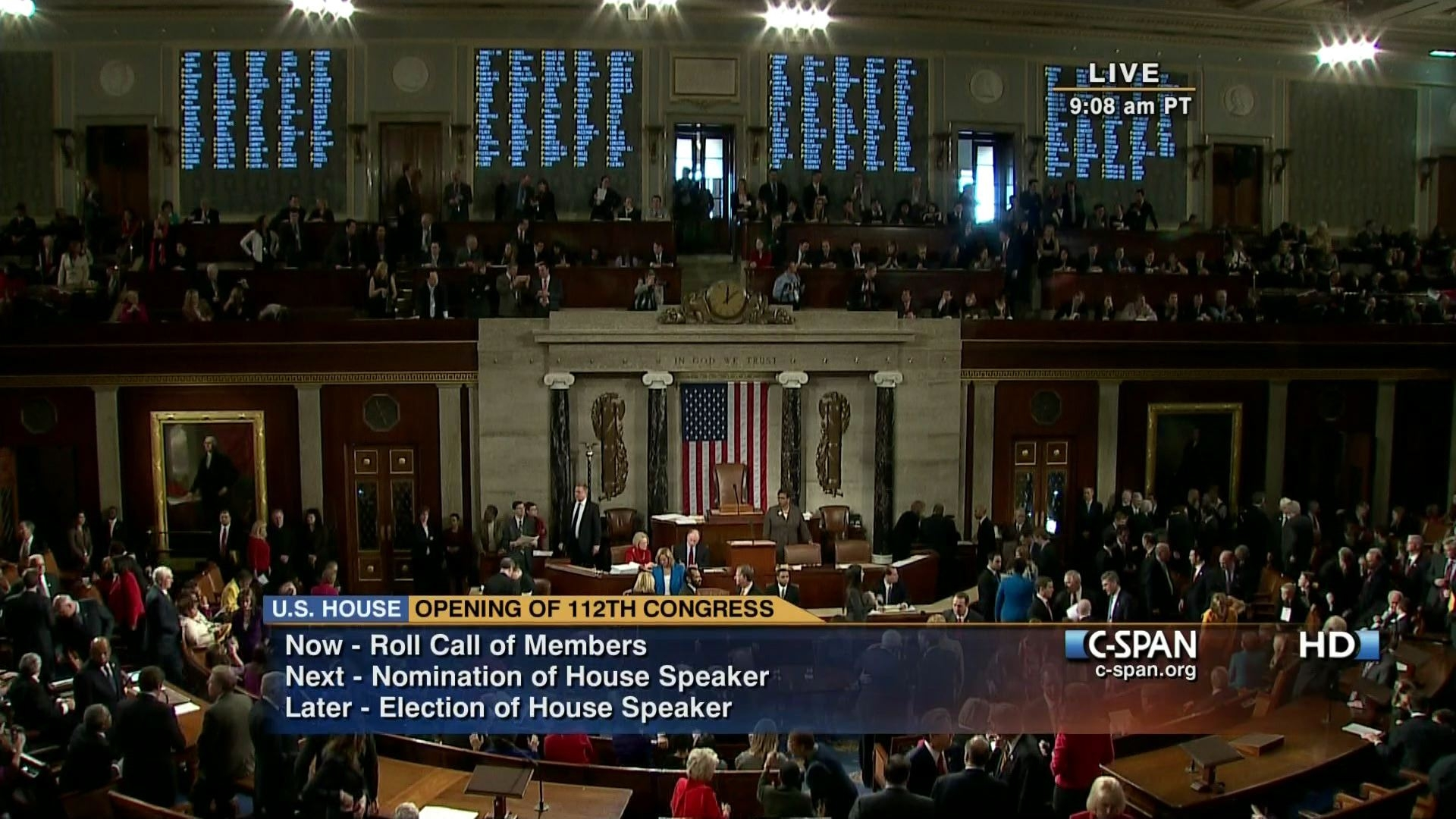
C-SPAN's HDTV coverage of the beginning of the 112th Congress on January 5, 2011. The on-screen design seen here was used from April 19, 2010, to January 17, 2016.

All three channels televise events such as congressional hearings, White House press briefings and presidential speeches, as well as other government meetings including Federal Communications Commission hearings and Pentagon press conferences. Other U.S. political coverage includes State of the Union speeches, and presidential press conferences. According to the results of a survey after the 1992 presidential election, 85% of C-SPAN viewers voted in that election. The results of a similar survey in 2013 found that 89% of C-SPAN viewers voted in the 2012 presidential election. In addition to this political coverage, the network broadcasts press conferences and meetings of various news media and nonprofit organizations, including those at the National Press Club, public policy seminars and the White House Correspondents' Dinner. While C-SPAN does not have video access to the Supreme Court, the network has used the Court's audio recordings accompanied by still photographs of the justices and lawyers to cover the Court in session on significant cases, and has covered individual Supreme Court justices' speaking engagements.

Occasionally, proceedings of the Parliament of Australia, Parliament of Canada, Parliament of the United Kingdom (usually Prime Minister's Questions and the State Opening of Parliament) and other governments are shown on C-SPAN when they discuss matters of importance to viewers in the U.S. Similarly, the networks will sometimes broadcast news reports from around the world when major events occur – for instance, C-SPAN broadcast CBC Television coverage of the September 11 attacks. C-SPAN also covers lying in state in the Capitol Rotunda and funerals of former presidents and other notable individuals. In 2005, C-SPAN covered Hurricane Katrina through NBC affiliate WDSU in New Orleans, as well as coverage of Hurricane Ike via CBS affiliate KHOU in Houston. C-SPAN also carries CBC coverage during events that affect Canadians, such as the Canadian federal elections, the death and state funeral of Pierre Trudeau, and the 2003 North America blackout. During early 2011, C-SPAN carried broadcasts by Al Jazeera to cover the events in Egypt, Tunisia, and other Arab nations. Additionally, C-SPAN simulcasts NASA Space Shuttle mission launches and landings live, using video footage and audio sourced from NASA TV.

With its public affairs programming, C-SPAN intends to offer different viewpoints by allowing time for multiple opinions to be discussed on a given topic. For example, in 2004 C-SPAN intended to televise a speech by Holocaust historian Deborah Lipstadt adjacent to a speech by Holocaust denier David Irving, who had unsuccessfully sued Lipstadt for libel in the United Kingdom four years earlier; C-SPAN was criticized for its use of the word "balance" to describe the plan to cover both Lipstadt and Irving. When Lipstadt ended media access to her speech, C-SPAN canceled coverage of both.

The network strives for neutrality and a lack of bias; in all programming when on-camera hosts are present their role is simply to facilitate and explain proceedings to the viewer. Due to this policy, C-SPAN hosts do not state their names on television.

=== C-SPAN and C-SPAN2 flagship programs ===
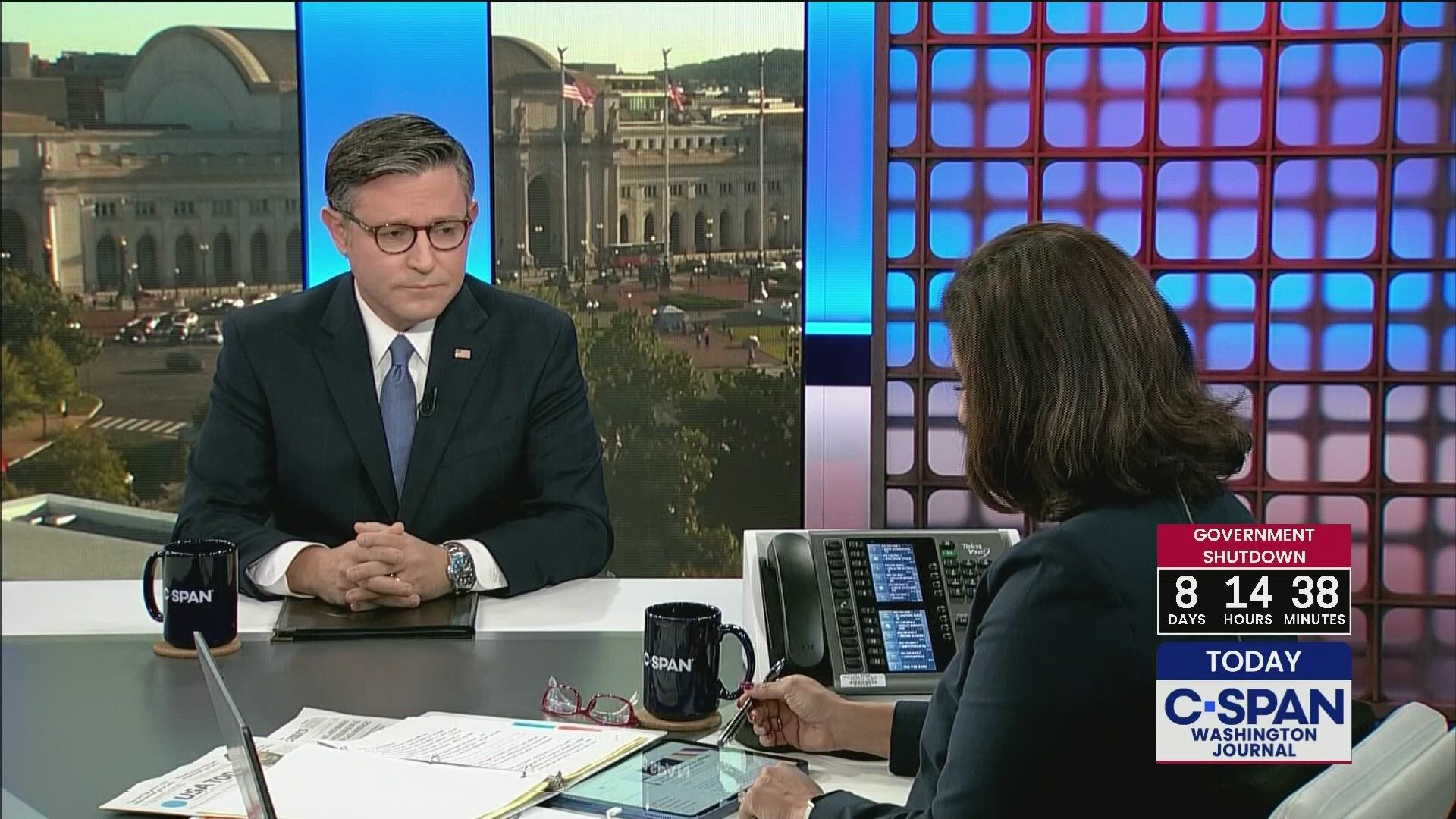
Speaker of the U.S. House Representatives Mike Johnson talks with C-SPAN host Mimi Gerges on Washington Journal.

C-SPAN covers floor proceedings of the House of Representatives, while C-SPAN 2 covers floor proceedings of the Senate. Although many hours of programming on C-SPAN are dedicated to coverage of the House, the network's daily programming begins with the political phone-in and interview program Washington Journal from 7:00 to 10:00 a.m. Eastern Time. Washington Journal premiered on January 4, 1995, and has been broadcast every morning since then, with guests including elected officials, government administrators, and journalists. The program covers current events, with guests answering questions on topics presented by the hosts, as well as questions from members of the general public. On weeknights C-SPAN2 dedicates its schedule to Politics and Public Policy Today (9:00 p.m. – midnight for the East Coast primetime, replayed immediately for the West Coast primetime), which is a block of recordings of the day's noteworthy events in rapid succession. On the weekend schedule, C-SPAN's main program is Q&A, a Sunday evening interview program hosted by Peter Slen, with guests including journalists, politicians, authors, and other public figures.

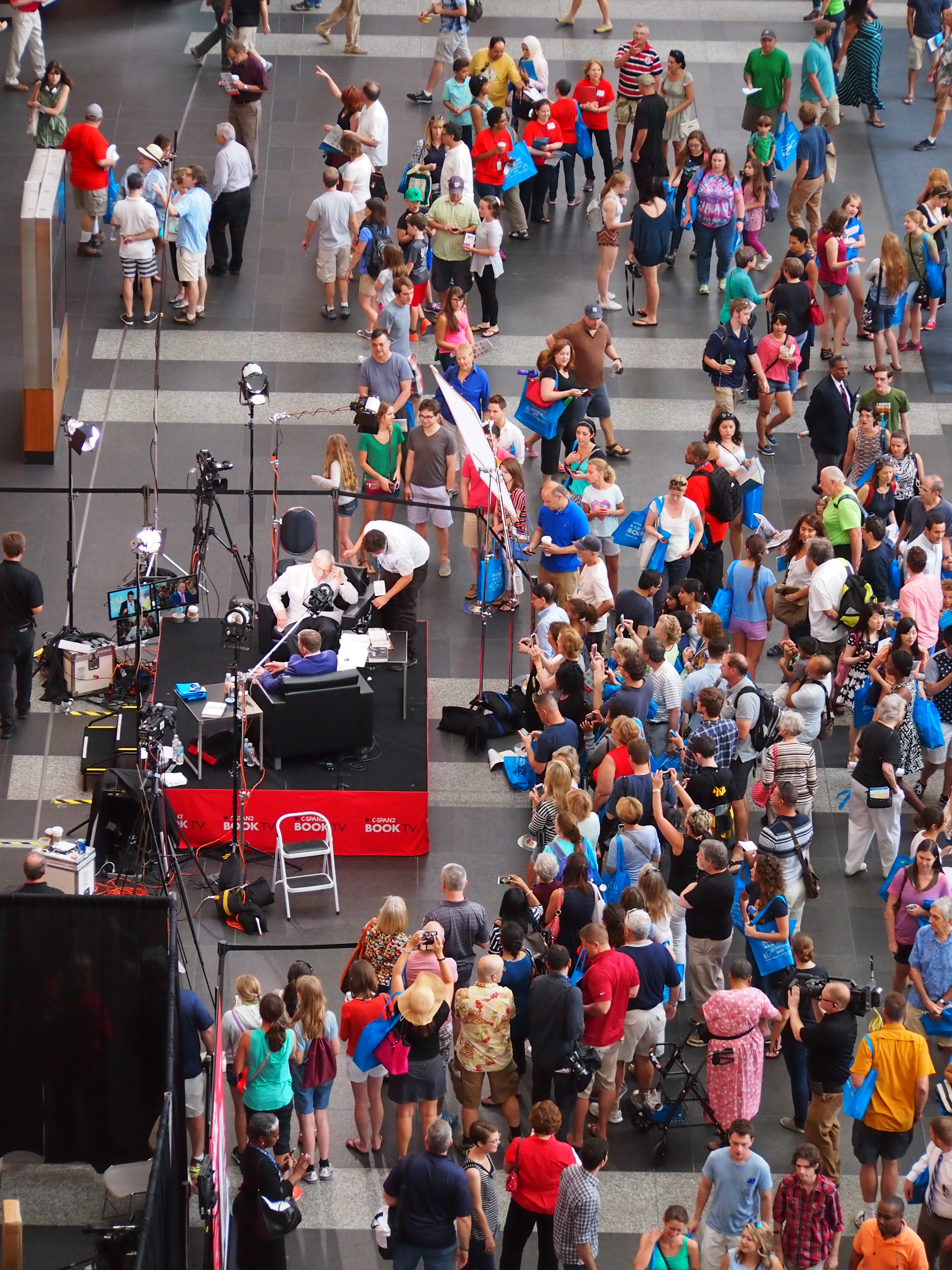
C-SPAN2 Book TV during the annual National Book Festival.

C-SPAN2 dedicates its Sunday schedule to Book TV, which is programming about non-fiction books, book events, and authors. Book TV was launched in September 1998. Booknotes was originally broadcast from 1989 to 2004, as a one-hour one-on-one interview of a non-fiction author. Repeats of the interviews remain a regular part of the Book TV schedule with the title Encore Booknotes.

Other Book TV programs feature political and historical books and biographies of public figures. These include In Depth, a live, monthly, three-hour interview with a single author, and After Words, an author interview program featuring guest hosts interviewing authors on topics with which both are familiar. After Words was developed as a new type of author interview program after the end of production of Booknotes. Weekend programming on Book TV also includes coverage of book events such as panel discussions, book fairs, book signings, readings by authors and tours of bookstores around the U.S.

=== C-SPAN3 ===
C-SPAN 3 covers public affairs events, congressional hearings and history programming. The weekday programming on C-SPAN3 (from the morning — anywhere from 6 to 8:30 a.m. — to 8 p.m. Eastern Time) features uninterrupted live public affairs events, in particular political events from Washington, D.C. Each weekend since January 8, 2011, the network has broadcast 48 hours of programming dedicated to the history of the United States, under the umbrella title American History TV. The programming covers the history of the U.S. from the founding of the nation through the late 20th century. Programs include American Artifacts, which is dedicated to exploring museums, archives and historical sites, and Lectures in History, featuring major university history professors giving lectures on U.S. history. In 2009, C-SPAN3 aired an eight-installment series of interviews from the Robert J. Dole Institute of Politics at the University of Kansas, which featured historian Richard Norton Smith and Vice President Walter Mondale, among other interviewees.

=== Special programming ===
C-SPAN has also occasionally produced special episodes and series. In 1989, C-SPAN celebrated its 10th anniversary with a three-hour retrospective on the history of the network. In 1994, Booknotes collaborated with Lincoln scholar Harold Holzer to produce reenactments of the 1858 Lincoln–Douglas debates for the network's 15th anniversary. The Alexis de Tocqueville Tour: Exploring Democracy in America and American Writers: A Journey Through History took viewers on tours of the United States, themed around Alexis de Tocqueville's travels and the works of 40 famous American writers, respectively. The year-long series American Presidents: Life Portraits, produced to commemorate the 20th anniversary of C-SPAN, won a Peabody Award. The network has also produced special feature documentaries on the history of various American institutions and landmarks. In 2005, C-SPAN hosted a 25-hour "call-in marathon" and essay contest, the winner of which was invited to co-host an hour of the broadcast, to commemorate 25 years of taking viewer telephone calls.

In 2015, C-SPAN premiered Landmark Cases: Historic Supreme Court Decisions, a 12-part mini-series about influential cases decided by the United States Supreme Court. A second season, also 12 episodes, aired in 2018.

First Ladies: Influence & Image, a 35-part series detailing the lives of American First Ladies, premiered in February 2013. A book based on the series, First Ladies: Presidential Historians on the Lives of 45 Iconic American Women, written by then C-SPAN co-CEO Susan Swain, was published in 2015.

=== Radio broadcasts ===
In addition to the three television networks, C-SPAN also broadcasts via C-SPAN Radio, which is carried on their owned-and-operated station WCSP-FM (90.1 FM) in the Washington, D.C., area with all three cable network feeds airing via HD Radio subchannels, and nationwide on XM Satellite Radio. Its programming is also livestreamed on the C-SPAN website and TuneIn and is available via apps for iPhone and Android devices. C-SPAN Radio has a selective policy regarding its broadcast content, rather than duplicating the television network programming, although it does offer some audio simulcasts of programs such as Washington Journal. Unique programming on the radio station includes oral histories, and some committee meetings and press conferences not shown on television due to programming commitments. The station also compiles the Sunday morning talk shows for a same-day rebroadcast without commercials, in rapid succession.

=== Online availability ===
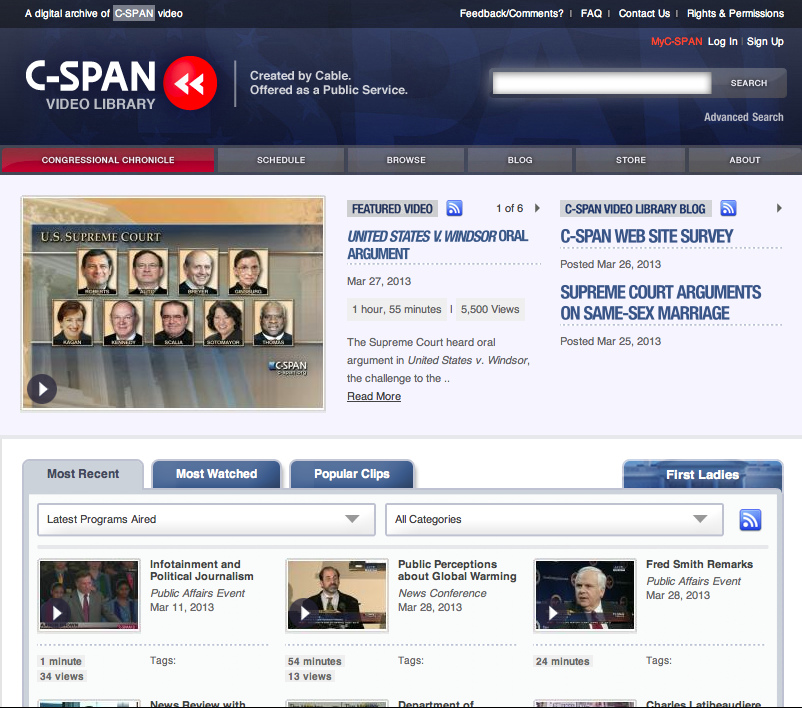
Home page of the C-SPAN Video Library, 2013

C-SPAN archival video is available through the C-SPAN Video Library, maintained at the Purdue Research Park in West Lafayette, Indiana. Unveiled in August 2007, the C-SPAN Video Library contains all of the network's programming since 1987, totaling more than 160,000 hours at its completion of digitization and public debut in March 2010. Older C-SPAN programming continues to be added to the library, dating back to the beginning of the network in 1979, and some limited earlier footage from the National Archives, such as film clips of Richard Nixon's 1972 trip to China, is available as well. Most of the recordings before 1987 (when the C-SPAN Archive was established) were not saved, except for approximately 10,000 hours of video which are slated to be made available online. As of November 2021, the C-SPAN Video Library held over 271,000 hours of programming, and they have been viewed over 253 million times. Described by media commentators as a major educational service and a valuable resource for researchers of politics and history, the C-SPAN Video Library has also had a major role in media and opposition research in several U.S. political campaigns. It won a Peabody Award in 2010 "for creating an enduring archive of the history of American policymaking, and for providing it as a free, user-friendly public service."

Prior to the initiation of the C-SPAN Video Library, websites such as Metavid and voterwatch.org hosted House and Senate video records, however C-SPAN contested Metavid's usage of C-SPAN copyrighted footage. The result was Metavid's removal of portions of the archive produced with C-SPAN's cameras, while preserving its archive of government-produced content. C-SPAN also engaged in actions to stop parties from making unauthorized uses of its content online, including its video of House and Senate proceedings. Most notably, in May 2006, C-SPAN requested the removal of Stephen Colbert's performance at the White House Correspondents' Association Dinner from YouTube. After concerns by some webloggers, C-SPAN gave permission for Google Video to host the full event. On March 7, 2007, C-SPAN liberalized its copyright policy for current, future, and past coverage of any official events sponsored by Congress and any federal agency and now allows for attributed non-commercial copying, sharing, and posting of C-SPAN video on the Internet, excluding re-syndication of live video streams. The new policy did not affect the public's right to use the public domain video coverage of the floor proceedings of the U.S. House and Senate.

In 2008, C-SPAN's online political coverage was expanded just prior to the elections, with the introduction of three special pages on the C-SPAN website: the C-SPAN Convention Hubs and C-SPAN Debate Hub, which offered video of major events as well as discussion from weblogs and social media about the major party conventions and candidate debates. C-SPAN brought back the Convention Hub for the 2012 presidential election.

On July 29, 2014, C-SPAN announced that it would begin restricting access to the live feeds of the main channel, C-SPAN2 and C-SPAN3 to subscribers of cable or satellite providers later that summer, citing concerns with the slow shift in viewing habits from cable television to the internet due to its reliance on carriage fees from cable and satellite providers. However, it will continue to allow all government meetings, hearings and conferences to be streamed live online and via archived on the C-SPAN Video Library without requiring an authenticated login by a provider; live audio feeds of all three channels are also available for free through the network's mobile app. The decision drew some criticism from public interest and government transparency advocates, citing the fact that C-SPAN was designed as a public service. As of December 2019, C-SPAN has begun advertising on its online videos, with advertisements that can be skipped after five seconds.

C-SPAN programming is available to stream through the C-SPAN Now mobile application, which features breaking news and short videos, as well as through C-SPAN Select, a smart television application.

== Organization and operations ==
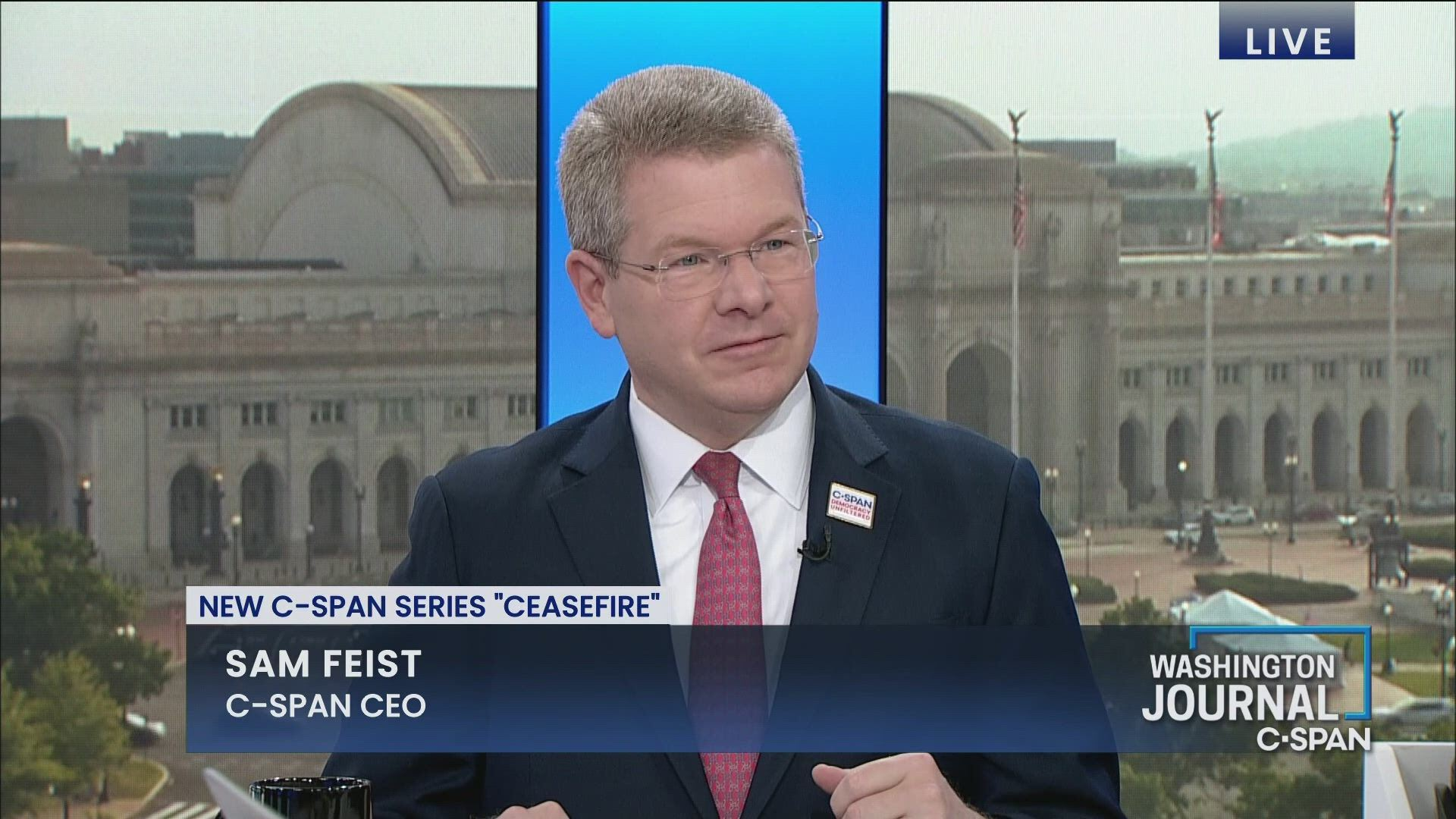
C-SPAN CEO Sam Feist discusses new program Ceasefire on C-SPAN.

National Cable Satellite Corporation
- Founded at: Washington, D.C.
- Type: Nonprofit
- Legal status: 501c3
- Purpose: Public affairs broadcasting
- Region served: United States of America
- Key people: Sam Feist (CEO); Patrick J. Esser (chair)
- Main organ: C-SPAN
- Revenue: ▼US$46.32 million (2023)
- Expenses: ▲US$ 46.15 million (2023)
- Staff: 198 (2023)
- Website: c-span.org

C-SPAN is operated by the National Cable Satellite Corporation (NCSC), a nonprofit organization. Early chairmen included Bob Rosencrans, John Saeman, Ed Allen and Gene Schneider.

As a non-commercial public service, C-SPAN receives most of its funding from subscriber fees charged to cable and direct-broadcast satellite (DBS) operators. As of 2025, C-SPAN receives 7.25¢ of each subscriber's monthly cable or live-streaming service bill. C-SPAN began airing internet commercials early in 2021 and now sells C-SPAN merchandise.

In September 2025, C-SPAN announced that it had reached an agreement with Alphabet Inc. and The Walt Disney Company to have its channels carried on YouTube TV and Hulu at a fee equal to those C-SPAN received from cable and satellite television companies. From 2015 to 2025, the number of U.S. households with cable or satellite television subscriptions that included C-SPAN fell from approximately 100 million to 70 million (as part of the general decline in cable and satellite television subscriptions among U.S. households during the same time period), which led C-SPAN's revenue to drop from $64 million in 2019 to $45.4 million in 2023.

As the network is an independent entity, neither the cable industry nor Congress controls the content of its programming.

As of January 2013, the network has 282 or 337 employees. C-SPAN had for many years led by co-CEOs Rob Kennedy and Susan Swain. Founder and former CEO Brian Lamb had served as the executive chairman of the board of directors.

On May 14, 2024, the C-SPAN board of directors announced that longtime CNN executive Sam Feist would become the new CEO. This announcement followed a national search initiated after Swain and Kennedy announced they would be retiring. Swain remained CEO until Feist officially began his duties in the summer of 2024.

The majority of C-SPAN's employees are based at C-SPAN's headquarters located on Capitol Hill in Washington, D.C. In 2003 television studios were opened in New York City and Denver, Colorado. These studios use digital equipment that can be controlled from Washington.

C-SPAN also maintains archives in West Lafayette, Indiana, at the Purdue Research Park under the direction of Robert X. Browning.

== Audience ==
The C-SPAN networks are available in more than 100 million households as of 2010, not including access to the C-SPAN websites. As of 2020, more than 20,000 telephone callers participate annually in discussions on Washington Journal. There are no official viewing statistics for C-SPAN because the network, which has no commercials or underwriting advertisements, does not use the Nielsen ratings. However, there have been a number of surveys providing estimates:

- A 1994 survey found that 8.6% of the U.S. population regularly watched C-SPAN.
- In 2004 this figure increased to 12% of the U.S. population, according to a Pew Research Center survey, while 31% of the population was categorized as occasional viewers. More than 28 million people said they watched C-SPAN programming each week.
- A March 2009 Hart Research survey found that 20% of homes with cable television watch C-SPAN at least once a week, for an estimated 39 million Americans.
- A 2010 poll conducted by C-SPAN and Penn Schoen Berland estimates that 79 million adults in the U.S. watched C-SPAN at some time from 2009 to 2010.
- In January 2013, Hart Research conducted another survey which showed that 47 million adults, or 24% of adults with access to cable television, watch C-SPAN weekly. Of the 47 million regular C-SPAN viewers, 51% are male and 49% female; 26% are liberal, 31% conservative, and 39% moderate. About half are college graduates. 28% of 18-to-49-year-olds report watching at least once a week, as do 19% of 50- to 64-year-olds, and 22% of those over age 65.
- In February 2017, Ipsos Audience conducted another survey which showed that 70 million adults, or 36% of adults with access to cable television, watch C-SPAN on a given six-month period. Of the 70 million regular C-SPAN viewers, 52% are male and 48% female; 25% are West viewers, 22% Midwest, 20% Northeast and 33% South. 28% identified themselves as liberal, 27% conservative, and 36% moderate. 51% of all viewers are 18–44 years old.
- A 2021 Ipsos poll showed the number of C-SPAN consumers had increased by approximately 20 percent from 2017.

== Public and media opinion ==
C-SPAN's public service nature has been praised as an enduring contribution to national knowledge. In 1987, Andrew Rosenthal wrote for The New York Times about C-SPAN's influence in political elections, arguing that C-SPAN's "blanket coverage" had expanded television journalism "into areas once shielded from general view". The network has received positive media coverage for providing public access to proceedings such as the Goldman Sachs Senate hearings, and the U.S. 2010 Healthcare Summit, while its everyday programming has been credited with providing the media and the general public with an intimate knowledge of U.S. political proceedings and people. The ability of C-SPAN to provide this service without federal funding, advertising or soliciting viewer contributions has been remarked by local newspapers and online news services, with the Daily Beast terming C-SPAN's $55 million annual budget (in 2009), "an astounding bargain." In April 2024, C-SPAN began soliciting donations from individuals to support its operations. In an article on the 25th anniversary of the network, The Washington Post noted that C-SPAN's programming has been copied by television networks worldwide and credits the network with providing information about foreign politics to American viewers. According to The New York Times, C-SPAN's mission to record official events in Washington, D.C., makes it "one of a kind", particularly in the creation of the C-SPAN Video Library, which received significant press coverage.

Despite its stated commitment to providing politically balanced programming, C-SPAN and its shows such as Washington Journal, Booknotes, Q & A, and After Words have been accused by some liberal organizations of having a conservative bias. In 2005, the media criticism organization Fairness and Accuracy in Reporting (FAIR) released a study of C-SPAN's morning telephone call-in show Washington Journal. In their six-month sample of guests, they identified 32 as "right-of-center" and 19 as "left-of-center"; they also noted people of color are underrepresented at 15% of the guest list. A 2007 survey released by the think tank Center for Economic and Policy Research reported that C-SPAN covered conservative think tanks more than left-of-center think tanks. In 2025, it was reported the channel was a favorite of Donald Trump.

== Other services ==
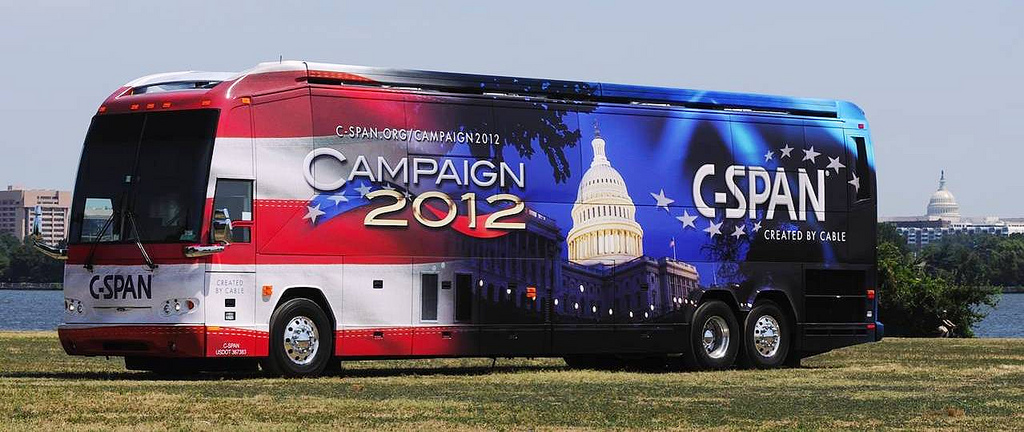
C-SPAN Digital Bus, which tours the U.S. educating the public about C-SPAN resources

C-SPAN offers a number of public services related to the network's public affairs programming. C-SPAN Classroom, a free membership service for teachers, began in July 1987 and offers help using C-SPAN resources for classes or research. The C-SPAN School Bus, introduced in November 1993, traveled around the U.S. educating the public about government and politics using C-SPAN resources, and served as a mobile television studio. The bus also recorded video footage of the places that it visited. A second bus was introduced in 1996. The two original buses were retired in 2010, and the C-SPAN Digital Bus was inaugurated, introducing the public to C-SPAN's enhanced digital products. C-SPAN has also equipped six Local Content Vehicles (LCVs) to travel the country and record unique political and historical stories, with each vehicle containing production and web-based technologies to produce on-the-spot content. This program ended in 2021.

C-SPAN has published ten books based on its programming; these contain original material and text taken from interview transcripts. The first C-SPAN book, C-SPAN: America's Town Hall, was published in 1988. Other C-SPAN books include: Gavel to Gavel: A C-SPAN Guide to Congress; Who's Buried in Grant's Tomb?, a guide to the grave sites of U.S. presidents; Abraham Lincoln - Great American Historians On Our Sixteenth President, a collection of essays based on C-SPAN interviews with American historians; and The Supreme Court, which features biographies and interviews with past Supreme Court judges together with commentary from legal experts. Five books have been drawn from the former Booknotes program: Booknotes: Life Stories; Booknotes: On American Character; Booknotes: Stories from American History; Booknotes: America's Finest Authors on Reading, Writing and the Power of Ideas, the latter a compilation of short monologues taken from the transcripts of Lamb's interviews; and a companion book to the series on Tocqueville, Traveling Tocqueville's America: A Tour Book.

== Prank calls and obscenities ==
Due to the open phone lines on Washington Journal, C-SPAN has been noted to have a tradition of prank calls. Calls have ranged from crude jokes about Howard Stern and Baba Booey to racist tirades against Martin Luther King Jr. and questions regarding the size of Mitt Romney's penis. One particularly well-known instance happened in 2015, when during a segment on the Iran nuclear deal framework, a man calling himself Jack Strickland called in claiming to be from Bel-Air, California, before quoting parts of the theme song of The Fresh Prince of Bel-Air TV show. Obscenities have also made it into broadcasts, such as in 2014 where a caller said "The Republicans hate that nigger Obama." before being kicked off the air. The network implemented a three-second broadcast delay in 2016 to combat these types of calls.

== Publications ==
- Educators' Guide: Teaching Critical Thinking in the Classroom (1995). Washington, DC: National Cable Satellite Corp. C-SPAN in the Classroom Series.
- Gavel to Gavel: A C-SPAN Guide to Congress (1999). Baltimore: Johns Hopkins University Press. ISBN 978-0-8018-6111-6.

== See also ==
- Public, educational, and government access television
- CPAC (TV channel)
