= C-SPAN Video Library =

Video streaming website

- Screenshot as of January 9, 2011
- Website type: Public affairs video streaming
- Available in: English
- Owner: C-SPAN
- Website: http://www.c-spanvideo.org/
- Registration: None
- Launched: March 17, 2010
- Current status: Online

C-SPAN Video Library is the audio and video streaming website of C-SPAN, the American legislative broadcaster. The site offers a complete, freely accessible archive going back to 1987. It was launched in March 2010, and was integrated into the main C-SPAN website in 2013.

== Available content ==
The site provides access to C-SPAN's collection of Congressional proceedings and other political and public affairs programming, including complete archives dating back to 1987. Content is searchable and browsable by program, topics, date, and speaker. At its launch in 2010, the site offered 160,000 hours of archived programming. New programming is archived shortly after broadcast.

C-SPAN was launched in 1979 but has limited archived material from its early years. According to C-SPAN itself, the first ever event broadcast by the network to be archived was the 90-minute confirmation hearings for Judge Robert Bork that aired on C-SPAN1 in September 15, 1987. When the site was launched in 2010 its director Robert X. Browning said 10,000 hours of other tapes from 1979 to 1987 were slated for restoration, digitization, and addition.

Congressional Chronicle is a section with searchable transcripts of House and Senate floor debates and pages for current and past members of Congress, with biographies, voting records, campaign finance records, and a timeline of House and Senate sessions. The site also provides episodes of Book TV and Booknotes, its now discontinued series of author interviews. In addition to C-SPAN programming, the site provides access to certain historic videos from the National Archives, such as video from President Nixon's 1972 trip to China.

== Recognition ==
Journalists and opposition researchers have used the site to locate past statements by politicians. Three sources used it to locate clips and information about Christine O'Donnell during her failed 2010 Senate bid.

Political commentator and MSNBC host Rachel Maddow is a prominent fan of the site. She said having access was "like being able to Google political history using the ‘I Feel Lucky’ button every time." Mediaite columnist Frances Martel called it "a landmark in government transparency" and said it was valuable for historical research.

In September 2010, the site was awarded the Golden Beacon by the Association of Cable Communicators, and in May 2011 it was recognized with a Peabody Award.

== History ==
C-SPAN has recorded and catalogued its coverage of Congress and other public affairs programming since the establishment of the C-SPAN Archives in 1987 at Purdue University's Purdue Research Park in West Lafayette, Indiana. However, prior to the Video Library's launch, C-SPAN's archived programming was only available to the public via videocassette and DVD purchase from C-SPAN; with the approval of the network's board of cable industry executives, the online archive was developed to make C-SPAN content more immediately accessible. The C-SPAN Video Library debuted unofficially in August 2007, with hosted video streaming and limited search tools. The following year, C-SPAN added an embeddable player to the Video Library's website. The full archive officially launched March 17, 2010, upon completion of a multi-year project that digitized C-SPAN programming from 1987 onward.
