= Emanuel Essery =

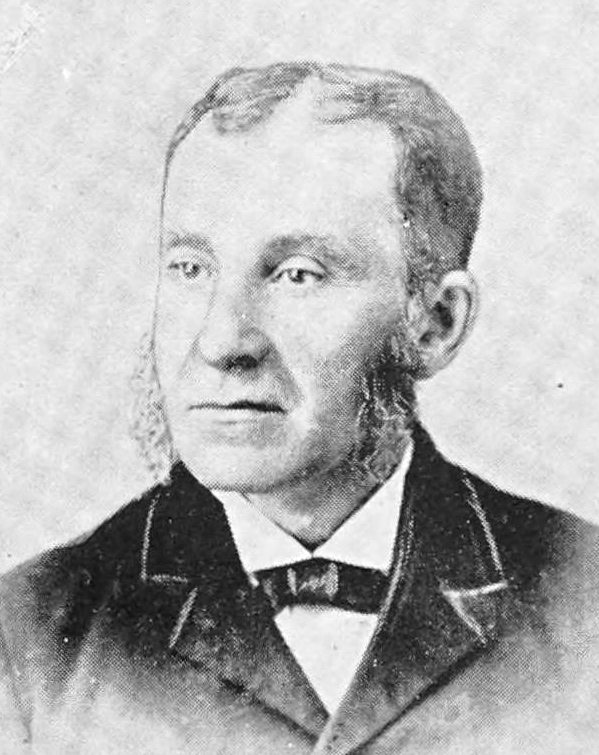
Essery in an undated photograph

Emanuel Thomas Essery, KC (c. 1843 – March 25, 1937) was a lawyer and politician in Ontario, Canada. He served as mayor of London, Ontario from 1893 to 1894.

The son of William H. Essery, he was born in London, Canada West and was educated there and at Toronto University. Essery was president of the London & Port Stanley Railway. He ran unsuccessfully for the London seat in the Canadian House of Commons in 1894. He served during the Fenian raids. Essery married Eliza Jane Wales. In 1908, he was named King's Counsel.

Essery was a prominent Orangeman and was president of the local St. George's Society and Sons of England. He was London Grand Master for the Ancient Free and Accepted Masons, grand secretary for the Canadian Order of Beavers and grand treasurer for the Ontario chapter of the Order of the Eastern Star.

He died in Toronto at the age of 94.
