= Why Lincoln Matters =

Why Lincoln Matters: Today More Than Ever (2004) is a book by former New York Governor Mario Cuomo. It is a discussion of how Cuomo believes that Abraham Lincoln is relevant to contemporary US politics.

Cuomo negatively compares Lincoln to George W. Bush, who was then president of the United States. Cuomo believed that Bush was a failure as president, whereas Lincoln was a success, and uses the book to explore the reasons why. Cuomo also criticizes other prominent Republicans such as Tom DeLay, Newt Gingrich, and Strom Thurmond. Cuomo does admit some similarities between Lincoln and Bush, but believes that Lincoln's record in responding to the issues of the day was better. Cuomo ends the book with a hypothetical address that Lincoln could have delivered to that year's United States Congress, were he still alive.
