= Sam Feist =

American media executive and journalist

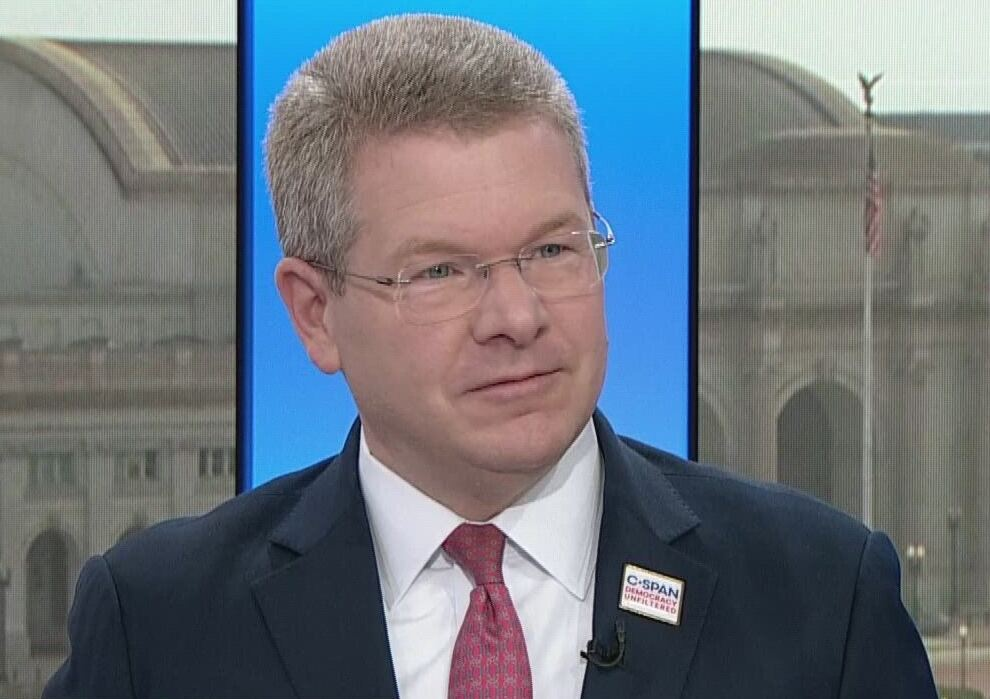
- Feist in 2025
- Education: Vanderbilt University (BA); Georgetown University (JD)
- Occupation: Media executive
- Employer: C-SPAN

Sam Feist is an American media executive and journalist. He is the chief executive officer of C-SPAN and former chief of CNN's Washington, D.C. news bureau.

== Early life and education ==
Feist received a bachelor of arts degree in political science from Vanderbilt University in 1991 and a juris doctor from Georgetown University in 1999. At Vanderbilt, Feist was a reporter and editor for The Vanderbilt Hustler.

== Career ==
Feist began working for CNN in 1989 as an intern. In 1990, he became a freelance producer in London. He received a full-time position in 1991 and moved to Atlanta. He moved to the network's Washington, D.C. news bureau in 1992. He was the founding executive producer of The Situation Room with Wolf Blitzer, which premiered in August 2005. Feist was the network's political director and senior executive producer for political coverage from 2006 to 2008, and named vice president of Washington-based programming in 2009. In 2011, CNN named Feist senior vice president and chief of its Washington, D.C., news bureau, where he oversaw newsgathering and production. Feist produced election night coverage and shows including Crossfire, Capital Gang, Evans & Novak, and Inside Politics. During election broadcasts, he was responsible for projecting the winners.

Feist was named chief executive officer of C-SPAN in May 2024, succeeding co-CEOs Susan Swain and Robert Kennedy. In 2025, he created Ceasefire, a panel discussion series bringing together Republicans and Democrats for civil discourse. The program was inspired by his work on Crossfire.

== Awards ==
Awards
Year	Recognized work	Role	Award/Honor	Awarding organization	Ref.
2007	Election Night	Executive producer	News and Documentary Emmy Award	Academy of Television Arts and Sciences	
2008	Coverage of 2008 Presidential Primary Campaigns and Debates	Executive producer	George Foster Peabody Award	National Association of Broadcasters	
2012	Revolution in Egypt: President Mubarak Steps Down	Vice President of Washington Programming	News and Documentary Emmy Award	Academy of Television Arts and Sciences	
2013	Election Night in America	Executive Producer	News and Documentary Emmy Award	Academy of Television Arts and Sciences	
2023	Live from the Capitol: January 6th, One Year Later	Executive producer	News and Documentary Emmy Award	Academy of Television Arts and Sciences	
2024	A CNN Town Hall: Toxic Train Disaster, Ohio Residents Speak Out	Executive producer	News and Documentary Emmy Award	Academy of Television Arts and Sciences	
