= James Robbins (shipbuilder) =

English shipbuilder

- Died: 1680; Copenhagen
- Other names: Jakob/Joakim/Johan Rubbens/Rubbenis/Rubberts/Rubbing
- Citizenship: Danish
- Occupation: The King of Denmark's Master Shipwright
- Years active: 1641-1680
- Known for: Builder of Sophia Amalia and other ships for the Danish navy

James Robbins, died 1680, was an English shipbuilder in Danish service who built Sophia Amalia and other ships for the Danish navy.

== Early career ==
Robbins began his professional life as a ship's carpenter in the Royal Navy. From 1635 he was employed as the King's Purveyor of Timber in Hampshire. King Charles I granted Christian IV of Denmark the right to recruit shipbuilders in England, and in 1641 Robbins accepted an offer to join the Danish service.

== Danish shipbuilder ==
Robbins began his Danish career in 1642 as a master shipwright at Bremerholm, the Danish main naval station, with the obligation to teach his craft to persons in "His Royal Majesty's service". One of his first assignments, was in 1642 to control if the upper deck of the ship Trefoldighed, being built in Neustadt, was done according to pattern. In 1645 Robbins was ordered to Norway to build ships from timber supplied by Hannibal Sehested, the Danish statholder. The timber purveyor, Frederik Bøjsen, a burgher of Christiania, was the government contractor for the building of the ships. In the shipyard on Hovedøya, in the Oslo Fiord, he successively built the naval ships Hannibal, a two-decker with 60 gun ports, launched in 1647; Sophia Amalia, a three-decker with 100 gun ports, launched in 1650; and Prins Christian, a two-decker with 91 gun ports, launched in the same year. Robbins returned to Denmark and remained in service at Bremerholm until 1665. He continued to live in Copenhagen, re-entered royal service in 1668, and died while active in 1680.
