= Renee Cramer =

American law and society scholar

Renée Ann Cramer
- Education: Bard College (B.A.); New York University (M.A., Ph.D.)
- Occupations: Academic provost and legal scholar
- Employer: Dickinson College
- Notable work: Cash, Color, and Colonialism: The Politics of Tribal Acknowledgment and Pregnant with the Stars: Watching, and Wanting, the Celebrity Baby Bump (the Cultural Lives of Law)

Renée Ann Cramer is an American law and society scholar. She is the Provost and Dean of Dickinson College in Carlisle, Pennsylvania, a position she has held since July 2023. She previously served as a professor and chair of the Law, Politics, and Society program at Drake University in Des Moines, Iowa.

== Education and career ==
Cramer received her Ph.D. from New York University in 2001. Her dissertation "The Politics of Recognition: What Matters In the Determination of Tribal Identity?" was honored the "2001 Outstanding Dissertation in "2001 Outstanding Dissertation in the Field of Race, Ethnicity, and Politics" in the Race, Ethnicity, and Politics Section of the American Political Science Association. Cramer received her Master of Philosophy from New York University in 1999 and a bachelor's in political science from Bard College in 1994. She served as assistant professor of political science, and a pre-law advisor at California State University from 2001-2005 and as assistant professor of law, politics, and society at Drake University from 2005-2009. She earned tenure and was promoted to associate professor in 2009; she was promoted to the rank of full professor in 2016.

Cramer served as the department chair of the Law, Politics, and Society chair at Drake University, where she was nominated for the Drake University Madeline M. Levitt Teacher of the Year award both in 2011 and 2010. In regards to professional leadership, Renee Cramer is the current president of the Consortium of Undergraduate Law and Justice Programs. She is on the National Advisory Council on the Life of the Law. The Life of the Law features podcasts detailing the intersectionality between law, politics, and society. She's also a member of the Law and Society Association, American Political Science Association, and Western Political Science Association and has served those organizations in various capacities. She has given numerous talks on platforms such as TedXDesMoines and has been published extensively.

== Specified areas of interest ==
Her work surrounding tribal acknowledgment has affected American legal studies and law. Her articles have appeared in Law and Social Inquiry, and Law and Policy. Her most recent publication on American Indian issues was recently published in Law, Culture, and Visual Studies.

She has been quoted in the national press on the topic of celebrity pregnancy, and her book on the issue was released in October 2015.

Cramer has also been active in ethnographic and participant-observation field work with homebirth midwives, advocates for midwifery, and families who practice non-normative parenting (including homebirth). An article on her fieldwork methodology was published in 2009 by International Journal of Qualitative Research. She is currently working on a book related to midwifery regulation and activism. The funding comes from a grant from the National Science Foundation.

She taught a wide array of interdisciplinary courses at Drake University such as Law and Social Change, Reproductive Law and Politics; Critical Race and Feminist Legal Theory; and Contemporary American Indian Law and Politics.

== Books ==
Cash, Color, and Colonialism: The Politics of Tribal Acknowledgment. 2005. Norman: University of Oklahoma Press. Paperback printing: 2008.

Pregnant with the Stars: Watching, and Wanting, the Pregnant Celebrity Baby Bump (The Cultural Lives of Law) with Stanford University Press, Cultural Lives of the Law list (Austin Sarat, editor).

== Noteworthy publications ==
2014 "Guarding Our Borders with Gardasil: Immigrant Women and Physical Autonomy." co- authored with Jessica Lavariega Monforti 35 Journal of Women, Politics and Policy 1: 1 – 30.

2013 "A Conceptual Framework for Non-Native Instructors who Teach Adult Native American Students at the University," co-authored with Thomas Buckmiller (Drake University, School of Education), 8 Multicultural Learning and Teaching 1: 7-26.

2012 "Don't They Understand Judicial Independence? Discourses of Judging in Undergraduate Legal Studies Classrooms: Judicial Retention and Same-Sex Marriage Rulings," Austin Sarat (ed), Studies in Law, Politics, and Society/Special Issue Discourses of Judging. Volume 58: 45 – 71.

2009 "Sharing in Community While Interviewing 'Outlaws' – Methodological Challenges and Opportunities," 1 International Review of Qualitative Research 4: 453 – 479.

2005 "Perceptions of the Process: The Indian Gaming Regulatory Act as it Affects Federal Tribal Acknowledgment Law and Practice," 27 Law & Policy Review 4 (October 2005).

=== Book chapters ===
2013 "Signs at Odds: The Semiotics of Law, Legitimacy, and Authenticity in Tribal Contexts" pages 471 – 496 in Anne Wagner and Richard Sherwin (eds.) Law, Culture, and Visual Studies, New York City: Springer.

2012 "The Baby Bump is the New Birkin," in Shira Tarrant and Marjorie Jolles (ed.), Fashion Talks: Undressing the Power of Style. Albany: SUNY Press.

2008 Several peer-reviewed and invited entries on Federal Acknowledgement and Tribal Gaming, in The Encyclopedia of United States Indian Policy and Law, edited by Tim Alan Garrison and Paul Finkleman, CQ Press.
