= CalTV =

American student-run online TV channel

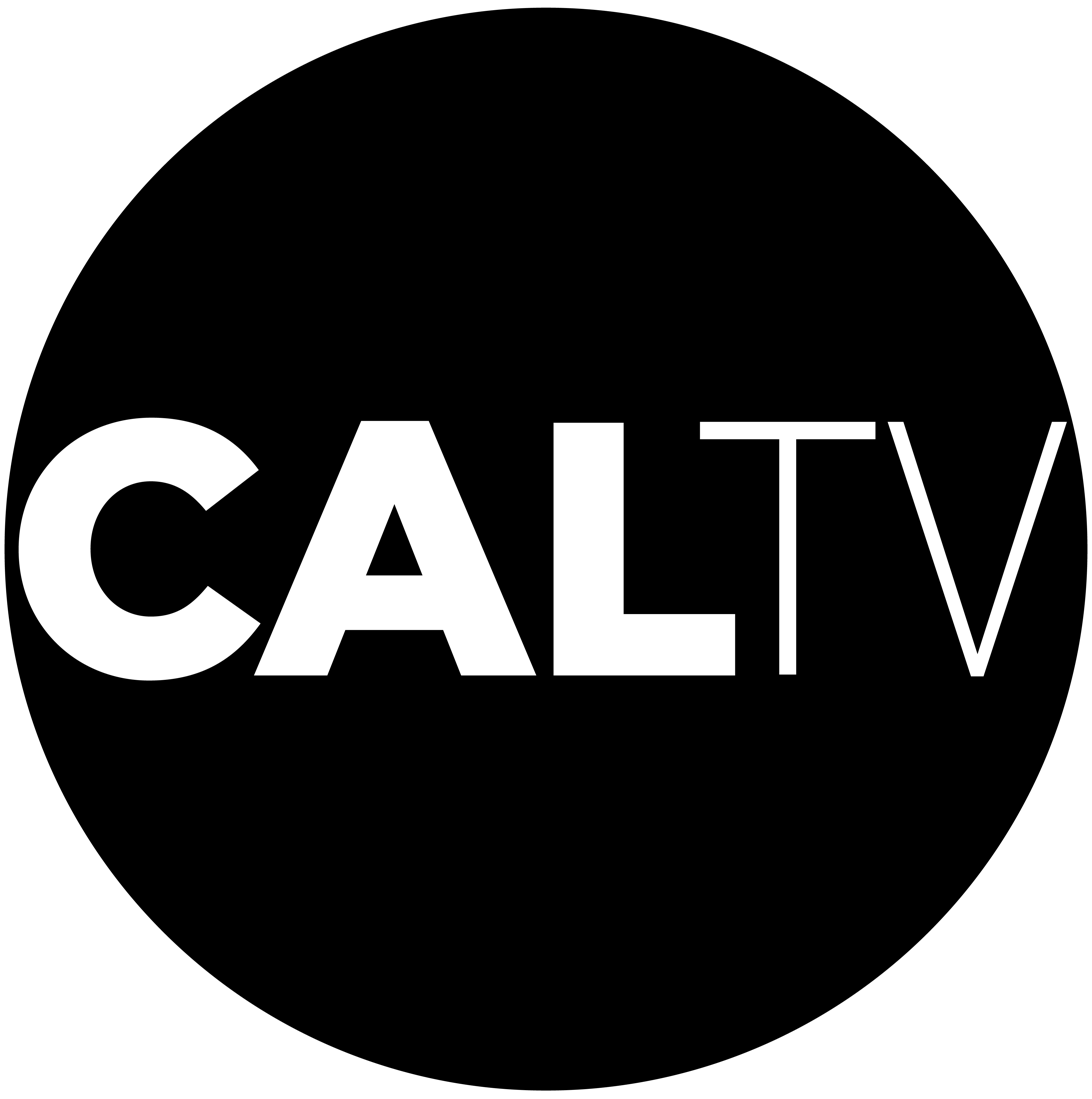
- Formation: 2005
- Founded at: Berkeley, California
- Headquarters: Martin Luther King Jr. Student Union
- Location: University of California, Berkeley
- Region served: Berkeley, California; United States
- Members: 120
- Official language: English
- Executive Directors: Alexis Rico; Isaiah Rivera
- Affiliations: Associated Students of the University of California (ASUC)
- Website: caltv.berkeley.edu

CalTV is a student-run online television station based at the University of California, Berkeley. It is a chartered organization of the Associated Students of the University of California (ASUC).

== History ==
In the spring of 2005, ASUC was able to secure sufficient funding to set up an online TV network. The station began producing a single show, focusing exclusively on news events (local, national, and international), presented in a street journalism style. The show featured brief backgrounds on stories introduced by CalTV journalists, followed by opinions from Berkeley students and professors.

Over time, CalTV's content expanded into sports, arts, and entertainment. "The CalTV Sports Highlight" debuted in 2006, covering California football, baseball, and water polo. In the spring semester of 2007, "The CalTV Show", an offbeat news show featuring commentary on student issues, began airing. "The CalTV Show" was later renamed "The CalBear Report".

== Funding ==
CalTV has been financially supported by ASUC. CalTV also works with Big Ideas @ Berkeley, an initiative that provides funding, support, and encouragement to interdisciplinary teams at UC Berkeley. The station has also been exploring revenue generation through ads and promotional activities.

== Recognition ==
The Daily Cal, Berkeley's newspaper, has published articles through CalTV. The station has also gained visibility in the Berkeley blogging community.
