= James Robbins (journalist) =

British journalist (born 1954)

- Born: 19 January 1954 (age 71)
- Education: Westminster School
- Alma mater: Christ Church, Oxford
- Title: Diplomatic and Royal Editor of BBC News (1998 – 9 October 2020)

James Robbins (born 19 January 1954) is a British journalist who was the BBC's Diplomatic and Royal Editor, a post he held from January 1998 until his retirement on 9 October 2020. He previously served as its Southern Africa Correspondent (from 1987 to 1991) and its Europe Correspondent (from 1992 to 1998). He led the BBC's coverage of 9/11, making the first report on that evening's BBC Ten O'Clock News, a report lasting over 7 minutes. He was a regular contributor to BBC news programmes.

== Early life ==
Robbins was born in 1954. He was educated at Eversley Preparatory School, Southwold, followed by Westminster School, an independent school for boys in central London. In 1973, Robbins attended Christ Church College at the University of Oxford. During his time there he edited Isis magazine, Oxford's student magazine, together with the soon-to-be venture capitalist Michael Moritz. Robbins read Politics, Philosophy and Economics (PPE), graduating with a BA(Hons) in 1976. He joined the BBC as a graduate trainee in 1977.

== Career ==
Robbins was first properly hired by the BBC in August 1987, when he became the corporation's Southern Africa Correspondent, based in Johannesburg.

Media offices
Preceded by Position created	Diplomatic and Royal Editor: BBC News; 1998 – 9 October 2020
