= Franz Joseph Esser =

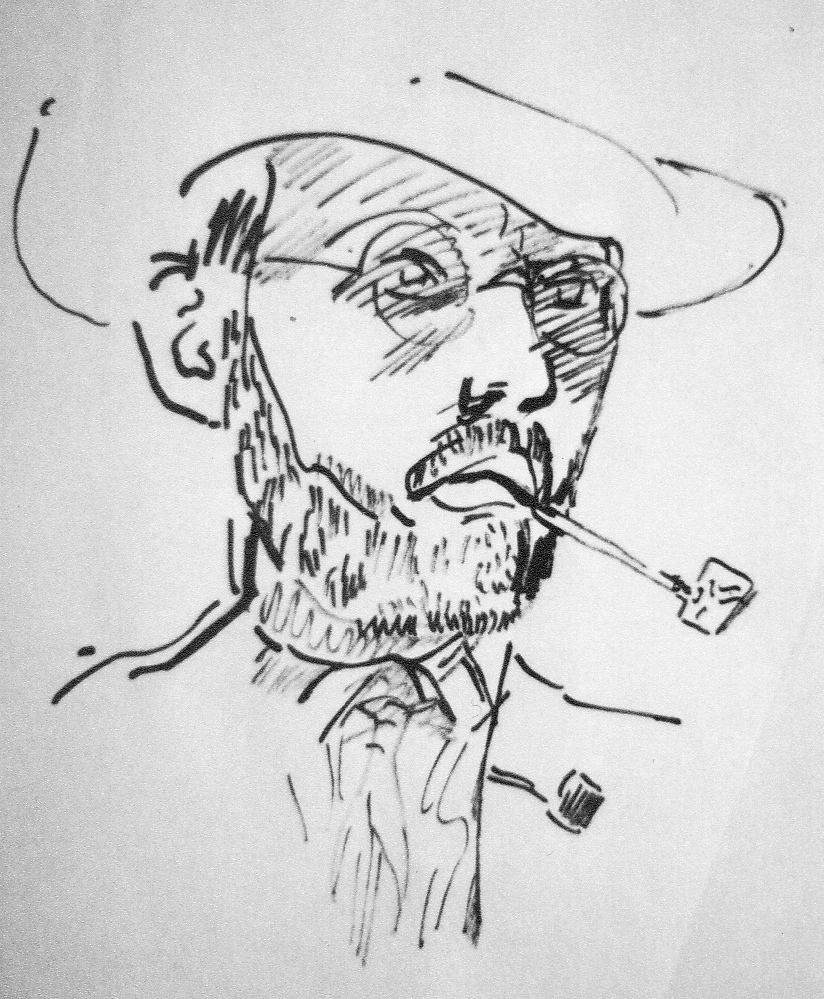
Franz Joseph Esser: Self-portrait with pipe, ink pen on drawing paper, ca. 1929

Franz Joseph Esser (January 16, 1891, in Cologne – June 18, 1964, in Seefeld, Upper Bavaria) was a German painter, watercolorist, caricaturist, draftsman and graphic artist who was both close to the Cologne Progressives and a member of the Nazi party.

== Family ==
Esser was the son of master Cologne shoemaker Franz Anton Hubert Esser (1857–1940) and his wife Anna Maria (1867–1936), née Menné. On October 28, 1933, he married Hedwig Maria Hubertine Schuler (1900–1945), called "Hetty," the youngest of eleven children of the Cologne merchant Karl Heinrich Hubert Schuler (1849–1912) and Hedwig Caroline Louise (1852–1938), née Welter. His wife's mother was the daughter of the Cologne painter Michael Welter. Franz Joseph and Hetty Esser had two children, Hedwig Mechtild (born 1935) and Franz Martin (born 1939). After the early death of his first wife, he married Liselotte Backhaus, née Schlüter, in 1950.

== Education ==
In 1907, as a 16-year-old, Esser began painting oil pictures. In 1910, he graduated from the Royal Kaiser Wilhelm Gymnasium in Cologne. He studied art history at the Rhenish Friedrich Wilhelm University of Bonn with Paul Clemen, at the Friedrich Wilhelm University of Berlin and at the Ludwig-Maximilians-Universität München with Heinrich Wölfflin until 1914. At the universities, he also took drawing and modeling courses, where he met Max Ernst. In 1912, he went on a study trip to Constantinople. Following his studies, he was employed as a volunteer at the Bockhorni Royal Court Glass Painting Company in Munich.

== Wartime service ==
At the beginning of the First World War in August 1914, Esser joined the German army. He was initially deployed to the Western Front on the Somme and in the Vosges, and later to the Eastern Front in Galicia and Romania, where he became a Russian prisoner of war in 1917. His subsequent odyssey through various camps in Siberia (Khabarovsk, Kansk) and a lengthy journey home through Manchuria can still be traced today on the basis of numerous sketches he made. He returned to Germany by sea via Vladivostok.

== Professional development ==
After his return, in 1921/22, he connected with Berlin artistic circles and became a member of the "Kommune," which soon dissolved, and in whose 1st and 2nd Manifestos he participated together with Otto Freundlich and Raoul Hausmann. Between 1922 and 1925 he stayed with or near his parents in Unkel. From there he made several trips to Prague.

From 1926 he lived mainly in Cologne, where he made several portraits - one litho and three pencil drawings - of Hetty Schuler, his future wife. In the same year, together with Peter Abelen (1884-1962) and Peter Hecker, he founded the sales association Der Kunstsammler. In the years up to 1933, his close contacts with the Cologne Progressive group developed, where he became acquainted with Gerd Arntz, Hannes Maria Flach, Marta Hegemann, Heinrich Hoerle, Franz W. Seiwert and Luise Straus-Ernst.

Study visits took him from Cologne to Istanbul and Paris between 1927 and 1929, where he presented his work in solo exhibitions. In 1928/29 the Wallraf-Richartz-Museum in Cologne acquired several of Esser's works. In 1929, he participated in a double exhibition together with Adolf Schleicher at the Cologne Kunstsalon Dr. Becker & Newman.

Between 1930 and 1933 he worked part-time as a press artist for the Kölnische Zeitung, writing and illustrating reports for the baths supplement "Die Reise". Around 1930/31 he dedicated the abstract oil painting "The Tennis Player" to Hetty Schuler… In 1932, together with Heinrich Maria Davringhausen, Peter Hecker, Heinrich Hoerle, Anton Räderscheidt and Franz W. Seiwert, he joined Group 32, which was forced to dissolve after the cession of power to the National Socialists.

== Nazi era ==
In 1934, he moved with his wife to Munich, where he worked as a cartoonist for the Süddeutsche Sonntagspost and the Münchner Neuesten Nachrichte until 1945. Although politically more left-wing, Esser joined the Nazi party to further his career.

The caricature "Hitler as a wolf" was created between 1936 and 1938. In 1937, three of his works (two watercolors, one print) were confiscated and destroyed in the Wallraf-Richartz-Museum as part of the Nazi campaign Entartete Kunst (Degenerate Art).

Between 1943 and 1947 he created numerous of his landscape watercolors and ink drawings, while between 1945 and 1950 he produced a series of formally reduced glass window designs as part of the reconstruction effort, if only for reasons of cost. Three of these were produced at the Franz Mayer'sche Hofkunstanstalt in Munich. In his denazification proceedings, he was banned from working as a caricaturist for three years by the Spruchkammer München-Land on May 11, 1948. However, from 1949 to 1964 he was again active as a cartoonist at the Nürnberger Nachrichten. Along the way, he again worked to a limited extent with abstract oil painting. From 1958, designs for book illustrations moved to the forefront of his work.

Esser died at the age of 73 in Seefeld am Pilsensee and was buried in Gräfelfing.

== Work ==
Between 1908 and 1964 Franz Esser was continuously active artistically as a painter or caricaturist. His works include watercolors, ink, pencil, colored pencil and charcoal drawings, lithographs, woodcuts, etchings, oil paintings, stained glass window designs (3 of which were executed), caricatures, and illustrations of travelogues and children's books.

Preferred subjects were landscapes, portraits, self-portraits (18 known so far), nudes, animal studies, still lifes, abstract compositions as well as religious and political subjects.

== Exhibitions ==
- 1921 – Unkel am Rhein: Verkaufsausstellung im Hotel Schulz mit mehr als 259 Exponaten
- 1926 – Köln: Gemeinschaftsausstellung im Kölnischen Kunstverein
- 1927 – Konstantinopel: Einzelausstellung in der Teutonia, 50 Exponate
- 1927 – Köln: Einzelausstellung im Kölnischen Kunstverein
- 1928 – Jena: Doppelausstellung zusammen mit Werner Burri im Kunstverein Jena, 12. Februar bis 11. März 1928, Aquarelle aus Konstantinopel
- 1928 – Köln: Gemeinschaftsausstellung „Kölner Kunst 1928“, Kölnischer Kunstverein, 2 Exponate
- 1928 – Paris: Einzelausstellung in der Galerie „Fermé la Nuit“, Quai de l’Horloge, 3. bis 27. Oktober 1928, 34 Exponate, Katalog
- 1929 – Köln: Gemeinschaftsausstellung „Deutscher Künstlerbund 1929“, Staatenhaus, Mai – September 1929, 1 Exponat, Katalog
- 1929 – Köln: Ausstellung zusammen mit Adolf Schleicher im Kunstsalon Dr. Becker & Newman
- 1929 – Berlin: Juryfreie Kunstschau Berlin, mehr als vier Exponate, Katalog
- 1930 – Köln: Beteiligung an der „Ausstellung Kölner Künstler 1930“ im Kölnischen Kunstverein, 2 Exponate, Katalog
- 1930 – Berlin: Beteiligung an der „Freie Kunstschau“
- 1931 – Köln: Gemeinschaftsausstellung zusammen mit Heinrich Maria Davringhausen, Franz W. Seiwert und Heinrich Hoerle im Kölnischen Kunstverein
- 1932 – Düsseldorf: Düsseldorf-Münchener Kunstausstellung im Kunstpalast, 14. Mai bis 31. August 1932, 1 Exponat
- 1949 – Unkel am Rhein: Einzelausstellung Villa Hattingen, ca. 170 Exponate, vorwiegend Aquarelle
- 1994 – München: Einzelausstellung „Franz Esser – Die Kölner Progressiven Jahre“, Galerie B. Dürr, 17. März bis 29. April 1994, Katalog
- 1995 – Nürnberg: Beteiligung an der Ausstellung „Stunde Null – Kunst nach ’45“, Galerie B. Dürr, Hallplatz 2, 11. August bis 16. September 1995
- 1996 – Istanbul: Beteiligung an der Ausstellung „Alman Karikatürü Sergisi“ im „Karikatür Müzesi“, 4. bis 30. April 1996, 9 Exponate
- 1999/2000 – München: Beteiligung an der Ausstellung „Verfehmt! Verboten! Vergessen?“, Galerie B. Dürr, 3. Dezember 1999 bis 3. März 2000, 2 Exponate
- 2001 – Zwickau: Beteiligung an der Ausstellung „Deutsche Graphik der zwanziger Jahre, Sammlung Gruber“ in der „Galerie am Domhof“, 14. Januar bis 4. März 2001, 1 Exponat
- 2002 – München: Beteiligung an der Ausstellung „Open Art – Open Mind: Mein erstes Bild“, Rathausgalerie, 10. bis 20. September 2002, 1 Exponat
- 2010 – München: Beteiligung an der Ausstellung „Die verschollene Generation – eine Auswahl“, Galerie Bernd Dürr, 10. September bis 17. Oktober 2010, 3 Exponate
- 2013 – Ingelheim am Rhein: Retrospektive Franz Joseph Esser (1891–1964), Rathausgalerie im Neuen Rathaus, 4. Februar bis 1. März 2013, 78 Exponate

== Literature ==
- Galerie Bernd Dürr, Hrsg.: Franz Esser. Die Kölner "Progressiven Jahre", Ausstellungskatalog, Köln 1993, München 1993 und 1994
- Wolfgang Sauré: Franz Esser. In: Weltkunst. Band 64, 1994, S. 825.
- Christoph Wilhelmi: Künstlergruppen in Deutschland, Österreich und der Schweiz seit 1900, Ernst Hauswedell & Co., Stuttgart 1996. ISBN 3-7762-0400-1, S. 155–156, 208–209.
- Franz Martin Esser: Die Gruppe "Kölner Progressive" und ihr künstlerisches Umfeld (1920-1933), VDG Weimar 2008. ISBN 978-3-89739-584-8.
- Franz Martin Esser: Franz Joseph Esser. Leben und Werk, Tectum Verlag, Marburg 2012, ISBN 978-3-8288-2881-0.
