= Patrick J. Esser =

Chief executive officer of Cox Communications

Patrick J. 'Pat' Esser is the Chairman of C-Span. He was formerly the chief executive officer of Cox Communications.

Esser assumed the role of president of the cable television company owned by Cox Enterprises in 2006. The announcement was made as part of a re-organization of the top three executives at the company, triggered by the retirement of James O. Robbins and Jimmy W. Hayes move to Cox Enterprises. After the changes, Esser reported to Hayes, who assumed the role of president and COO of Cox Enterprises. Before leading the company, Esser served as executive vice president and chief operating officer.

Esser entered the cable industry in 1979 and first joined Cox later that year in its Hampton Roads, Virginia, system. After working in various marketing and advertising sales roles, Cox promoted Esser to vice president of advertising sales in 1991 and senior vice president of operations in 1999.

Esser is a graduate of the University of Northern Iowa. He holds a B.A. and M.A. in communications media and is a 2003 recipient of the university's Heritage Honors Alumni Achievement Award.

In 2007, Esser was named Executive of the Year by industry publication Multichannel News.
