= Road to the White House =

- Genre: Public affairs
- Country of origin: United States
- Original language: English

Original release
- Network: C-SPAN
- Release: January 1987 – present

Road to the White House is an American television series on the C-SPAN network that periodically follows campaign-related activities of official and potential Democratic, Republican, third party and independent presidential candidates during the quadrennial United States presidential election cycles.
