= James O. Robbins =

American telecommunications executive (1942–2007)

Jim Robbins
- Born: James O. Robbins; July 4, 1942; Mount Kisco, New York, U.S.
- Died: October 10, 2007 (aged 65); Atlanta, Georgia, U.S.
- Education: University of Pennsylvania, Harvard University
- Occupation: Cable television executive

James O. 'Jim' Robbins (July 4, 1942 – October 10, 2007) was the president of Cox Communications from 1985 to 1995, and then was president and CEO starting in 1995 when the company went public. He retired from that position in 2005. Robbins joined Cox as vice president of the company's New York City Operations in 1983, and was later promoted to senior vice president of operations in Atlanta. At Cox he was responsible for transforming the company from a singular pay TV cable operator, to a full service entertainment and telecommunications provider, pioneering the role of offering the Triple Play bundle of video, voice, and broadband Internet services. Cox was the first large service provider worldwide to offer triple play services over a single network.

Prior to Cox, Robbins spent five years at Continental Cablevision, as assistant vice president and regional manager and then as vice president and general manager, Viacom Cablevision of Long Island, and then senior vice president of operations, Western Region. From 1972 to 1979, Robbins served in various management positions for Continental Cablevision of Ohio, Inc., and Montachusett Cable Television, a wholly owned subsidiary of the Adams-Russell Company. Previously, he was managing editor of WBZ-TV News in Boston.

Robbins completed a BA at the University of Pennsylvania, followed by an MBA at Harvard University. Robbins deployed for two tours of duty in Vietnam with the US Navy between 1965 and 1967, serving first as a destroyer line officer and later as a deputy public-affairs officer for the gunboat flotilla Mobile Riverine Force, stationed on the Mekong River.
