= Lists of C-SPAN Q&A interviews =

Q&A is an interview series on the C-SPAN network that typically airs every Sunday night. It is hosted by C-SPAN founder Brian Lamb. Its stated purpose is to feature discussions with "interesting people who are making things happen in politics, the media, education, and science & technology in hour-long conversations about their lives and their work."

- List of C-SPAN Q&A interviews first aired in 2004 and 2005
- List of C-SPAN Q&A interviews first aired in 2006
- List of C-SPAN Q&A interviews first aired in 2007
- List of C-SPAN Q&A interviews first aired in 2008
- List of C-SPAN Q&A interviews first aired in 2009
- List of C-SPAN Q&A interviews first aired in 2010
- List of C-SPAN Q&A interviews first aired in 2011
- List of C-SPAN Q&A interviews first aired in 2012
- List of C-SPAN Q&A interviews first aired in 2013
- List of C-SPAN Q&A interviews first aired in 2014
- List of C-SPAN Q&A interviews first aired in 2015
- List of C-SPAN Q&A interviews first aired in 2016
- List of C-SPAN Q&A interviews first aired in 2017
- List of C-SPAN Q&A interviews first aired in 2018
- List of C-SPAN Q&A interviews first aired in 2019
- List of C-SPAN Q&A interviews first aired in 2020
- List of C-SPAN Q&A interviews first aired in 2021
- List of C-SPAN Q&A interviews first aired in 2022
- List of C-SPAN Q&A interviews first aired in 2023
- List of C-SPAN Q&A interviews first aired in 2024
- List of C-SPAN Q&A interviews first aired in 2025
- List of C-SPAN Q&A interviews first aired in 2026
