= List of C-SPAN Q&A interviews first aired in 2010 =

Q&A is an interview series on the C-SPAN network that typically airs every Sunday night. It is hosted by C-SPAN founder Brian Lamb. Its stated purpose is to feature discussions with "interesting people who are making things happen in politics, the media, education, and science & technology in hour-long conversations about their lives and their work."

Original air date (Links to video)	Interviewee(s)	Comments
January 3, 2010	Leslie & Andrew Cockburn	Featured discussion of the documentary American Casino.
January 10, 2010	Michael Scammell	Featured discussion of Scammell's book Koestler: The Literary and Political Odyssey of a Twentieth-Century Skeptic about Arthur Koestler.
January 17, 2010	Fred Grandy	
January 24, 2010	Students from The Washington Center	
January 31, 2010	Terry Teachout	Featured discussion of Teachout's book Pops: A Life of Louis Armstrong.
February 7, 2010	Thom Hartmann	
February 14, 2010	David Bossie	
February 21, 2010	Ted Morgan	Featured discussion of Morgan's book Valley of Death: The Tragedy at Dien Bien Phu That Led America into the Vietnam War.
February 28, 2010	Kike Arnal	Featured a discussion of Arnal's book of photographs In the Shadow of Power.
March 7, 2010	Patricia McGuire	Featured a discussion of McGuire's role as president of Trinity Washington University.
March 14, 2010	Michelle Easton	
March 28, 2010	David Martin	
April 4, 2010	Michael Lewis	Featured discussion of Lewis's book The Big Short: Inside the Doomsday Machine.
April 11, 2010	Evan and Michael Gregory	Featured discussion of Auto-Tune the News.
April 18, 2010	Stanley Crouch	
April 25, 2010	Douglas Brinkley and Richard Norton Smith	
May 2, 2010	Ahmed Rashid	Featured discussion of the tenth anniversary edition of Rashid's book Taliban.
May 9, 2010	Ted Leonsis	
May 16, 2010	Joyce Appleby	Featured discussion of Appleby's book The Relentless Revolution: A History of Capitalism.
May 23, 2010	Terence Samuel	Featured discussion of Samuel's book The Upper House: A Journey Behind the Closed Doors of the U.S. Senate.
May 30, 2010	David and Jeanne Heidler	Featured discussion of the Heidlers' book Henry Clay: The Essential American.
June 6, 2010	Brody Mullins	
June 13, 2010	Alex Gibney	Featured discussion of Gibney's documentary Casino Jack and the United States of Money.
June 20, 2010	Leo Damrosch	Featured discussion of Damrosch's book Tocqueville's Discovery of America.
June 27, 2010	Madeleine Sackler	Featured discussion of Sackler's documentary The Lottery.
July 4, 2010	R. Jeffrey Smith	
July 11, 2010	Jorge Ramos	
July 18, 2010	Robert Service	Featured discussion of Service's three biographies on Joseph Stalin, Vladimir Lenin, and Leon Trotsky.
July 25, 2010	Clark Hoyt	
August 1, 2010	W. Joseph Campbell	Featured discussion of Campbell's book Getting it Wrong: Ten of the Greatest Misreported Stories in American Journalism.
August 8, 2010	Greg Barker	
August 15, 2010	Don Ritchie	
August 22, 2010	Philip Terzian	
August 29, 2010	Michael Kaiser	
September 5, 2010	Meredith Whitney	
September 12, 2010	Nicholas von Hoffman	Featured discussion of von Hoffman's book Radical: A Portrait of Saul Alinsky.
September 19, 2010	Warren Brown	
September 26, 2010	Isabel Wilkerson	Featured discussion of Wilkerson's book The Warmth of Other Suns: The Epic Story of America's Great Migration.
October 3, 2010	Ron Chernow	Featured discussion of Chernow's biography of George Washington, Washington: A Life. (Part one of two.)
October 10, 2010	Ron Chernow	Featured discussion of Chernow's biography of George Washington, Washington: A Life. (Part two of two.)
October 17, 2010	Justice Stephen Breyer	Featured discussion of Breyer's book Making Our Democracy Work.
October 24, 2010	William McKay and Charles Johnson	Featured discussion of the book Parliament & Congress: Representation & Scrutiny in the Twenty-First Century, which was co-written by McKay and Johnson.
October 31, 2010	Richard Norton Smith and Douglas Brinkley	
November 7, 2010	Derek Leebaert	Featured discussion of Leebaert's book Magic and Mayhem: The Delusions of American Foreign Policy from Korea to Afghanistan.
November 14, 2010	Bethany McLean	Featured discussion of McLean's book All the Devils Are Here: The Hidden History of the Financial Crisis.
November 21, 2010	Edmund Morris	Featured discussion of Morris's three books on the life of Theodore Roosevelt: The Rise of Theodore Roosevelt, Theodore Rex, and Colonel Roosevelt.
November 28, 2010	Gerald Blaine and Clint Hill	Featured discussion of Blaine's book The Kennedy Detail.
December 5, 2010	John F. Burns	One of several Q&A interviews filmed during a trip to London. Featured discussion of Burns's role as London correspondent for the New York Times.
December 11, 2010	Stephanie Flanders	One of several Q&A interviews filmed during a trip to London. Featured discussion of Flanders's role as economics editor for the British Broadcasting Corporation.
December 12, 2010	Matthew Parris	One of several Q&A interviews filmed during a trip to London. Featured discussion of Parris's experiences as a journalist and as a member of the British House of Commons.
December 18, 2010	John Wakeham	One of several Q&A interviews filmed during a trip to London. Featured discussion of Wakeham's experiences as a member of the British House of Commons and House of Lords.
December 19, 2010	Dan Reed	One of several Q&A interviews filmed during a trip to London. Featured discussion of Reed's documentary Terror in Mumbai.
December 26, 2010	Lord John Wakeham, Diane Abbott, Stephanie Flanders, Matthew Parris	Featured excerpts from interviews aired on December 5, 11, 12, and 18, centering around the topic: "The U.S. and the U.K.: Contrasts and Comparisons"
