= List of C-SPAN Q&A interviews first aired in 2011 =

Q&A is an interview series on the C-SPAN network that typically airs every Sunday night. It is hosted by C-SPAN founder Brian Lamb. Its stated purpose is to feature discussions with "interesting people who are making things happen in politics, the media, education, and science & technology in hour-long conversations about their lives and their work."

Original air date (Links to video)	Interviewee(s)	Comments
January 2, 2011	Bob Samuelson	
January 9, 2011	Martha Raddatz	
January 16, 2011	Students from The Washington Center	
January 23, 2011	Christopher Hitchens	The discussion with Hitchens was at his home in Washington D.C., and took place during the course of his treatment for his esophageal cancer.
January 30, 2011	Former President George W. Bush	The discussion took place at Southern Methodist University, the future site of the George W. Bush Presidential Center. Nineteen students from that university took part in the interview. Bush's memoir Decision Points featured in the discussion.
February 6, 2011	Mick Caouette	Featured discussion of Caouette's documentary Hubert H. Humphrey: The Art of the Possible.
February 13, 2011	R. Gerald Turner	Featured discussion of Turner's role as President of Southern Methodist University.
February 20, 2011	Donald Rumsfeld	Featured discussion of Rumsfeld's memoir, Known and Unknown.
February 27, 2011	Winslow Wheeler	
March 6, 2011	Sally Jenkins	
March 13, 2011	John C. Hulsman	
March 20, 2011	Kathryn Wylde	Featured discussion of the Partnership for New York City.
March 27, 2011	Charles Blow	
April 3, 2011	Stephen Goldsmith	
April 10, 2011	Melissa Lee	
April 17, 2011	Andrew Ferguson	Featured discussion of Ferguson's book Crazy U: One Dad's Crash Course in Getting His Kid Into College.
April 24, 2011	Mike Daisey	
May 1, 2011	Carol Guzy	
May 8, 2011	Dick Couch	
May 15, 2011	Richard Miniter	Featured discussion of Miniter's book Mastermind: The Many Faces of the 9/11 Architect, Khalid Shaikh Mohammed.
May 22, 2011	David McCullough	Featured discussion of McCullough's book The Greater Journey: Americans in Paris. (Part one of two parts.)
May 29, 2011	David McCullough	Featured discussion of McCullough's book The Greater Journey: Americans in Paris. (Part two of two parts.)
June 5, 2011	James Grant	Featured discussion of Grant's book on Thomas B. Reed, Mr. Speaker!: The Life and Times of Thomas B. Reed, The Man Who Broke the Filibuster.
June 12, 2011	Pierre Thomas	Featured discussion of Thomas's role as Senior Justice Correspondent for ABC News.
June 19, 2011	Andrew Rossi	Featured discussion of Rossi's documentary Page One: Inside the New York Times.
June 26, 2011	Russ Roberts and John Papola	Featured discussion of Roberts's podcast EconTalk and Roberts and Papola's music video Fear the Boom and Bust.
July 3, 2011	Scott Miller	Featured discussion of Miller's book The President and the Assassin: McKinley, Terror, and Empire at the Dawn of the American Century.
July 10, 2011	Nick Gillespie	
July 17, 2011	Carol Highsmith	
July 24, 2011	Erik Larson	Featured discussion of Larson's book In the Garden of Beasts, about U.S. Ambassador to Germany William Dodd.
July 31, 2011	Juan Williams	Featured discussion of Williams's book Muzzled: The Assault on Honest Debate.
August 7, 2011	Alyona Minkovski	Featured discussion of The Alyona Show.
August 14, 2011	Washington Journalism and Media Conference	Featured discussion with high school students attending the Washington Journalism and Media Conference at George Mason University.
August 21, 2011	Pamela Constable	Featured discussion of Constable's book, Playing With Fire: Pakistan At War With Itself.
August 28, 2011	Clarence Lusane	Featured discussion of Lusane's book The Black History of the White House.
September 4, 2011	Miles J. Unger	Featured discussion of Unger's book Machiavelli: A Biography.
September 11, 2011	N/A	Preempted due to Live Coverage of 9/11 Events
September 18, 2011	Ivan Kander and Rob Jones	Featured discussion of Kander's documentary Survive. Recover. Live. The Rob Jones Story, about the injuries sustained by his friend Jones during his service in the U.S. Marine Corps in the War in Afghanistan.
September 25, 2011	Naomi Schaefer Riley	Featured discussion of Riley's book The Faculty Lounges and Other Reasons Why You Won't Get the College Education You Paid For, about tenure in higher education.
October 2, 2011	Cary Nelson	Featured discussion of Nelson's role as the president of the American Association of University Professors, including Nelson's responses to comments made by Naomi Schaefer Riley in the previously aired interview. The taping of this program was interrupted by the 2011 Virginia earthquake.
October 9, 2011	John Paul Stevens	Featured discussion of Stevens's book Five Chiefs: A Supreme Court Memoir.
October 16, 2011	Alfredo Quiñones-Hinojosa	Featured discussion of Quiñones-Hinojosa's book Becoming Dr. Q: My Journey From Migrant Farm Worker to Brain Surgeon.
October 23, 2011	Gov. Mitch Daniels	This interview took place on the campus of Purdue University and featured discussion of Daniels's book Keeping the Republic: Saving America by Trusting Americans.
October 30, 2011	Jill Abramson	Featured discussion of Abramson's book The Puppy Diaries: Raising a Dog Named Scout and her role as executive editor of The New York Times.
November 6, 2011	Stacy Schiff	Featured discussion of Schiff's biography of Cleopatra.
November 13, 2011	Karl Marlantes	Featured discussion of Marlantes's book What It Is Like To Go To War.
November 20, 2011	Lawrence Lessig	Featured discussion of Lessig's book Republic, Lost: How Money Corrupts Congress - and a Plan to Stop It.
November 27, 2011	Simon Winchester	Featured discussion of Winchester's book Atlantic: Great Sea Battles, Heroic Discoveries, Titanic Storms, and a Vast Ocean of a Million Stories,
December 4, 2011	Carl Colby	Featured discussion of Colby's documentary, The Man Nobody Knew, about his father, William Colby.
December 11, 2011	Maj. Gen. Marcia Anderson	
December 18, 2011	John Feinstein	Featured discussion of Feinstein's book One on One: Behind the Scenes with the Greats in the Game.
December 25, 2011	Michelle Fields	
