= List of C-SPAN Q&A interviews first aired in 2019 =

Q&A is an interview series on the C-SPAN network that typically airs every Sunday night. It is hosted by C-SPAN founder Brian Lamb. Its stated purpose is to feature discussions with "interesting people who are making things happen in politics, the media, education, and science & technology in hour-long conversations about their lives and their work."

Original air date (Links to video)	Interviewee(s)	Comments
January 6, 2019	Keach Hagey	Featured discussion of Hagey's book The King of Content: Sumner Redstone's Battle for Viacom, CBS, and Everlasting Control of His Media Empire about Sumner Redstone.
January 13, 2018	James Grant	Featured discussion of Grant's work as publisher of Grant's Interest Rate Observer.
January 20, 2019	Patricia Miller	Featured discussion of Miller's book Bringing Down the Colonel: A Sex Scandal of the Gilded Age, and the “Powerless” Woman Who Took On Washington.
January 27, 2019	Jane Leavy	Featured discussion of Leavy's book The Big Fella: Babe Ruth and the World He Created.
February 3, 2019	Ron Liebman and Tim Baker	Featured discussion of Liebman and Baker's experiences prosecuting Spiro Agnew.
February 10, 2019	Helen Andrews	Featured discussion of Andrews' article Shame Storm in First Things magazine.
February 17, 2019	Monica Norton	Featured discussion of the Washington Post column Norton wrote about James Baldwin's novel If Beale Street Could Talk.
February 24, 2019	Elizabeth Samet	Featured discussion of Samet's annotated edition of the Personal Memoirs of Ulysses S. Grant.
March 3, 2019	Eileen Rivers	Featured discussion of Rivers's book Beyond the Call: Three Women on the Front Lines in Afghanistan.
March 10, 2019	Amy S. Greenberg	Featured discussion of Greenberg's book Lady First: The World of First Lady Sarah Polk.
March 17, 2019	Matthew Hoh	Featured discussion of Hoh's article "Time for Peace in Afghanistan and an End to the Lies".
March 23, 2019	Robert Caro	Featured discussion of Caro's book Working: Researching, Interviewing, Writing.
March 30, 2019	Joan Biskupic	Featured discussion of Biskupic's book The Chief: The Life and Turbulent Times of Chief Justice John Roberts.
April 7, 2019	Douglas Brinkley	Featured discussion of Brinkley's book American Moonshot: John F. Kennedy and the Great Space Race.
April 14, 2019	Susan Page	Featured discussion of Page's book The Matriarch: Barbara Bush and the Making of an American Dynasty.
April 21, 2019	U.S. Senate Youth Program	
April 28, 2019	David Brooks	Featured discussion of Brooks's book The Second Mountain: The Quest for a Moral Life.
May 5, 2019	Harold Holzer and Amity Shlaes	Featured discussion of the C-SPAN book The Presidents: Noted Historians Rank America’s Best - and Worst - Chief Executives.
May 12, 2019	David Maraniss	Featured discussion of Maraniss's book A Good American Family: The Red Scare and My Father.
May 19, 2019	David McCullough	Featured discussion of McCullough's book The Pioneers: The Heroic Story of the Settlers Who Brought the American Ideal West. This was the last Q&A program to feature Brian Lamb as its regular host.
September 8, 2019	Margaret O'Mara	Featured discussion of O'Mara's book The Code: Silicon Valley and the Remaking of America. This was the first Q&A program to feature Susan Swain as its host.
September 15, 2019	Malcolm Gladwell	Featured discussion of Gladwell's book Talking to Strangers.
September 22, 2019	Kay Coles James	Featured discussion of Coles's experiences as president of The Heritage Foundation.
September 29, 2019	James Banner	Featured discussion of Banner's book Presidential Misconduct: From George Washington to Today.
October 6, 2019	Peter Liebhold	Featured discussion of the history of tariffs in the United States.
October 13, 2019	Jeff Guinn	Featured discussion of Guinn's book The Vagabonds: The Story of Henry Ford and Thomas Edison's Ten-Year Road Trip.
October 20, 2019	Alan Kraut	Featured discussion of the history of immigration policies in the United States.
October 27, 2019	Chris Arnade	Featured discussion of Arnade's book Dignity: Seeking Respect in Back Row America.
November 3, 2019	Elizabeth Papez	Featured discussion of the influence of several notable U.S. Supreme Court justices.
November 10, 2019	Susannah Cahalan	Featured discussion of Cahalan's book The Great Pretender, about the Rosenhan experiment.
November 17, 2019	Pamela Constable	Featured discussion of Constable's experiences as the Afghanistan/Pakistan bureau chief for the Washington Post.
November 24, 2019	Lara Brown	Featured discussion of the U.S. presidential nomination process.
December 1, 2019	Patty Rhule	Featured discussion of the history of press coverage American presidents.
December 8, 2019	Holly Jackson	Featured discussion of Jackson's book American Radicals: How Nineteenth-Century Protest Shaped the Nation
December 15, 2019	Azra Raza	Featured discussion of Raza's role as director of the Myelodysplastic Syndromes Center at Columbia University.
