= List of C-SPAN Q&A interviews first aired in 2008 =

Q&A is an interview series on the C-SPAN network that typically airs every Sunday night. It is hosted by C-SPAN founder Brian Lamb. Its stated purpose is to feature discussions with "interesting people who are making things happen in politics, the media, education, and science & technology in hour-long conversations about their lives and their work."

Original air date (Links to video)	Interviewee(s)	Comments
January 6, 2008	Dr. Yvonne Thornton	Featured discussion of Thornton's book The Ditchdigger's Daughters: A Black Family's Astonishing Success Story.
January 13, 2008	Jonathan Karl	
January 20, 2008	Dr. Elmer Huerta	Featured discussion of Huerta's role as president of the American Cancer Society
January 27, 2008	Bill Buzenberg	Featured discussion of Buzenberg's role as executive director of the Center for Public Integrity.
February 3, 2008	Sudhir Venkatesh	Featured discussion of Venkatesh's book Gang Leader for a Day.
February 10, 2008	Frances Fragos Townsend	
February 17, 2008	David Burstein	Featured discussion of Burstein's film 18 in '08.
February 24, 2008	Ken Dilanian	
March 2, 2008	Nathan McCall	
March 9, 2008	Robert Compton	Featured discussion of Compton's documentary Two Million Minutes: A Global Examination.
March 16, 2008	Doug Mills	Featured discussion of Mills's role as a photojournalist for the New York Times.
March 23, 2008	Phil Donahue	Featured discussion of Donahue's documentary Body of War.
March 30, 2008	Roger Mudd	Featured discussion of Mudd's book The Place To Be: Washington, CBS, and the Glory Days of Television News. (Part one of two.)
April 6, 2008	Roger Mudd	Featured discussion of Mudd's book The Place To Be: Washington, CBS, and the Glory Days of Television News. (Part two of two.)
April 13, 2008	Gordon Wood	Featured discussion of Wood's book The Purpose of the Past: Reflections on the Uses of History.
April 20, 2008	Richard Miniter	
April 27, 2008	Dr. Edna Greene Medford	
May 4, 2008	Justice Antonin Scalia	Featured discussion of Scalia's book Making Your Case: The Art of Persuading Judges.
May 11, 2008	Doris Buffett	Featured discussion of Buffett's role as head of the Sunshine Lady Foundation.
May 18, 2008	James Rosen	Featured discussion of Rosen's biography of John Mitchell, The Strong Man: John Mitchell and the Secrets of Watergate.
May 25, 2008	Thomas DiLorenzo	
June 1, 2008	Colman McCarthy	
June 8, 2008	Frederick Downs, Jr.	Featured discussion of Downs's role as Chief Prosthetics & Clinical Logistics Officer for the U.S. Department of Veterans Affairs.
June 15, 2008	Michelle Bernard	Featured discussion of Bernard's role as president of the Independent Women's Forum.
June 22, 2008	Renu Khator	Featured discussion of Khator's dual role as chancellor of the University of Houston System and president of the University of Houston.
June 29, 2008	Aaron Woolf	Featured discussion of Woolf's documentary King Corn.
July 6, 2008	Kathleen Parker	
July 13, 2008	David Maraniss	Featured discussion of Maraniss's book Rome 1960: The Olympics that Changed the World.
July 20, 2008	Brit Hume	
July 27, 2008	Chris Hedges	Featured discussion of Hedges's book Collateral Damage: America's War Against Iraqi Civilians.
August 3, 2008	Rep. Nancy Pelosi	Featured discussion of Pelosi's book "Know Your Power: A Message to America's Daughters.
August 10, 2008	Three Years Later: Conversations with Iraq War Veterans	
August 17, 2008	Ben Stein	Featured discussion of Stein's book How to Ruin the United States of America.
August 24, 2008	Greg Mortenson	Featured discussion of Mortenson's book Three Cups of Tea.
August 31, 2008	Bruce Cole	Featured discussion of Cole's role as chairman of the National Endowment for the Humanities, and the NEH "Picturing America" project.
September 7, 2008	Linda Robinson	Featured discussion of Robinson's book Tell Me How This Ends: General David Petraeus and the Search for a Way Out of Iraq.
September 14, 2008	Peter Wallison	Featured discussion of Wallison's work with the American Enterprise Institute.
September 21, 2008	Lionel	
October 5, 2008	John Podhoretz	
October 12, 2008	Lynette Clemetson	Featured discussion of Clemetson's role as managing editor of The Root.
October 19, 2008	Mark Levin	
October 26, 2008	Mark Farkas	Featured discussion of the C-SPAN program The White House: Inside America's Most Famous Home.
November 2, 2008	Rick Shenkman	Featured discussion of Shenkman's book Just How Stupid Are We? Facing the Truth About the American Voter.
November 9, 2008	Harold Holzer	Featured discussion of Holzer's book Lincoln President-Elect: Abraham Lincoln and the Great Secession Winter, 1860-1861.
November 16, 2008	Michael Rosenblum	
November 23, 2008	Brent Glass	Featured discussion of Glass's role as director of the National Museum of American History.
November 30, 2008	Lauren Whittington, John McArdle, and Emily Yehle	Featured discussion of the United States Capitol Visitor Center with Roll Call journalists Whittington, McArdle, and Yehle.
December 7, 2008	Rep. Donna Edwards	
December 14, 2008	William Seale	Featured discussion of Seale's two-volume work The President's House: A History.
December 21, 2008	Sen. Bob Corker	
December 28, 2008	Ray Price	
