= List of C-SPAN Q&A interviews first aired in 2007 =

Q&A is an interview series on the C-SPAN network that typically airs every Sunday night. It is hosted by C-SPAN founder Brian Lamb. Its stated purpose is to feature discussions with "interesting people who are making things happen in politics, the media, education, and science & technology in hour-long conversations about their lives and their work."

Original air date (Links to video)	Interviewee(s)	Comments
January 7, 2007	Michael Gerson	
January 14, 2007	Melody Barnes	
January 21, 2007	Gary Walters	Featured discussion of the responsibilities of the White House Chief Usher.
January 28, 2007	Rep. Stephanie Tubbs Jones	
February 4, 2007	Sen. Tom Coburn	
February 11, 2007	John Burns	
February 18, 2007	Kimberley Strassel	
February 25, 2007	Andrew Cockburn	Featured discussion of Cockburn's book Rumsfeld: His Rise, Fall, and Catastrophic Legacy.
March 4, 2007	Robert Kagan	
March 11, 2007	Margaret MacMillan	Featured discussion of MacMillan's book Nixon and Mao: The Week That Changed the World.
March 18, 2007	Lyle Denniston	
March 25, 2007	Kasey Pipes	Featured discussion of Pipes's book Ike's Final Battle, about the Little Rock Nine and Little Rock Central High School.
April 1, 2007	Ishmael Beah	Featured discussion of Beah's book A Long Way Gone: Memoirs of a Boy Soldier.
April 8, 2007	Zbigniew Brzezinski	Featured discussion of Brzezinski's book Second Chance: Three Presidents and the Crisis of American Superpower.
April 15, 2007	Gen. Michael Hayden	
April 22, 2007	David Stewart	Featured discussion of Stewart's book The Summer of 1787: The Men Who Invented the Constitution, about the U.S. Constitutional Convention.
April 29, 2007	Robert Dallek	Featured discussion of Dallek's book Nixon and Kissinger: Partners in Power.
May 6, 2007	Emmett Tyrrell	
May 13, 2007	Borzou Daragahi	
May 20, 2007	Andrew Ferguson	Featured discussion of Ferguson's book Land of Lincoln.
May 27, 2007	Joseph Cirincione	Featured discussion of Cirincione's book Bomb Scare: The History and Future of Nuclear Weapons.
June 3, 2007	Frank Gaffney	Featured discussion of Gaffney's documentary Islam vs Islamists.
June 10, 2007	Katrina vanden Heuvel	
June 17, 2007	Evan Osnos	
June 24, 2007	Robert Kurson	Featured discussion of Kurson's book Crashing Through: A True Story of Risk, Adventure, and the Man Who Dared to See.
July 1, 2007	James Billington	
July 8, 2007	Asra Nomani	
July 15, 2007	Robert Novak	Featured discussion of Novak's memoir The Prince of Darkness: 50 Years Reporting In Washington.
July 22, 2007	Randall Robinson	Featured discussion of Robinson's book An Unbroken Agony: Haiti, From Revolution to the Kidnapping of a President.
July 29, 2007	Kevin Leffler	Featured discussion of Leffler's film Shooting Michael Moore.
August 5, 2007	Dr. Christine Montross	Featured discussion of Montross's book Body of Work: Meditations on Mortality from the Human Anatomy Lab.
August 12, 2007	Tony Snow	
August 19, 2007	Janks Morton	Featured discussion of Morton's film What Black Men Think.
August 26, 2007	Rep. Dave Obey	Featured discussion of Obey's book Raising Hell for Justice: The Washington Battles of a Heartland Progressive.
September 2, 2007	Rep. Ray LaHood	
September 9, 2007	Michelle Rhee	
September 16, 2007	Al Neuharth	
September 23, 2007	John Batchelor	
September 30, 2007	Wendy Kopp	Featured discussion of Kopp's role as CEO and founder of Teach For America.
October 7, 2007	Justice Clarence Thomas	Featured discussion of Thomas's book My Grandfather's Son.
October 14, 2007	Michael Korda	Featured discussion of Korda's book IKE: An American Hero.
October 21, 2007	Michael Oreskes	Featured discussion of The Genius of America: How The Constitution Saved Our Country and Why It Can Again.
October 28, 2007	Charles Ferguson	Featured discussion of Ferguson's film No End In Sight.
November 4, 2007	John Bolton	Featured discussion of Bolton's book Surrender Is Not an Option: Defending America at the United Nations and Abroad.
November 11, 2007	David Kennedy	
November 18, 2007	Bob Drogin	Featured discussion of Drogin's book Curveball: Spies, Lies, And The Con Man Who Caused A War.
November 25, 2007	Nicholas Negroponte	Featured discussion of the One Laptop Per Child program.
December 2, 2007	John Micklethwait	
December 9, 2007	Kimberly Kagan	
December 16, 2007	Joe Madison	
December 23, 2007	Tom Blanton	Featured discussion of Blanton's role as director of the National Security Archive, and his work responding to Freedom of Information Act requests.
December 30, 2007	Marc Pachter	Featured discussion of Pachter's role as director of the National Portrait Gallery.
