= List of C-SPAN Q&A interviews first aired in 2012 =

Q&A is an interview series on the C-SPAN network that typically airs every Sunday night. It is hosted by C-SPAN founder Brian Lamb. Its stated purpose is to feature discussions with "interesting people who are making things happen in politics, the media, education, and science & technology in hour-long conversations about their lives and their work."

Original air date (Links to video)	Interviewee(s)	Comments
January 1, 2012	William Beutler	Featured discussion of Wikipedia
January 8, 2012	Ward Carroll	Featured discussion of Military.com
January 15, 2012	Glenn Kessler	Featured discussion of Kessler's "The Fact Checker" column in The Washington Post.
January 22, 2012	Diana West	
January 29, 2012	Michael Hastings	Featured discussion of Hastings's book The Operators: The Wild and Terrifying Inside Story of America's War in Afghanistan.
February 5, 2012	Ray Mabus	Featured discussion of Mabus's role as Secretary of the Navy.
February 12, 2012	Josh Marshall	Featured discussion of Talking Points Memo
February 19, 2012	Charles Evans, Jr. and Victor DeNoble	Featured discussion of Evans's documentary Addiction Incorporated, which featured DeNoble.
February 26, 2012	Neera Tanden	Featured discussion of the Center for American Progress
March 4, 2012	Robert Kagan	Featured discussion of Kagan's book The World America Made.
March 11, 2012	Tim Weiner	Featured discussion of Weiner's book Enemies: The History of the FBI.
March 18, 2012	Walter E. Williams	
March 25, 2012	Sonja Sohn	Featured discussion of Sohn's organization ReWired for Change.
April 1, 2012	Jerry Ensminger and Rachel Libert	Featured discussion of the documentary Semper Fi: Always Faithful, directed by Libert and featuring Ensminger.
April 8, 2012	United States Senate Youth Program	
April 15, 2012	Katrina Lantos Swett	
April 22, 2012	Douglas Wissing	Featured discussion of Wissing's book Funding the Enemy: How U.S. Taxpayers Bankroll The Taliban.
April 29, 2012	Blaine Harden	Featured discussion of Harden's book Escape From Camp 14: One Man's Remarkable Odyssey from North Korea to Freedom in the West.
May 6, 2012 and May 20, 2012	Robert Caro	Featured discussion of Caro's bookThe Years of Lyndon Johnson: The Passage of Power, which is the fourth of five volumes in Caro's study of Lyndon Johnson.
May 13, 2012	Nancy Gibbs and Michael Duffy	Featured discussion of Gibbs's and Duffy's book The Presidents Club: Inside the World’s Most Exclusive Fraternity. This interview was one hour and 35 minutes long.
May 27, 2012	Clint Hill	Featured discussion of Hill's book Mrs. Kennedy and Me.
June 3, 2012	Douglas Brinkley	Featured discussion of Brinkley's biography of Walter Cronkite.
June 10, 2012	Angela T. Rye	Featured discussion of the Congressional Black Caucus
June 17, 2012	Brian Kamoie	
June 24, 2012	Dan Balz	
July 1, 2012	Gretchen Morgenson	Discussion of Morgenson's book Reckless Endangerment
July 8, 2012	Kirk S. Lippold	Featured discussion of Lippold's book Front Burner: Al Qaeda's Attack on the USS Cole
July 15, 2012	Antony Beevor	Featured discussion of Beevor's book The Second World War
July 22, 2012	David Wood	Featured discussion of Wood's 10-part series for the Huffington Post, Beyond the Battlefield: The War Goes on for the Severely Wounded
July 29, 2012	Antonin Scalia	
August 5, 2012	Rep. John Lewis	Featured discussion of Lewis's book Across That Bridge: Life Lessons and a Vision for Change.
August 12, 2012	Andrew Nagorski	Featured discussion of Nagorski's book Hitlerland: American Eyewitnesses to the Nazi Rise to Power.
August 19, 2012	Walter Pincus	
August 26, 2012	Julianna Goldman	
September 2, 2012	Ami Horowitz	Featured discussion of Horowitz's documentary U.N. Me.
September 9, 2012	Colbert I. King	
September 16, 2012	Andrew Kaczynski	Featured discussion of Kaczynski's research for BuzzFeed.
September 23, 2012	Neil Barofsky	Discussion of Barofsky's book Bailout: An Inside Account of How Washington Abandoned Main Street While Rescuing Wall Street.
September 30, 2012	Allan Sloan and Geoff Colvin	Featured discussion of Sloan's and Colvin's work with Fortune magazine.
October 7, 2012	Morley Safer	
October 14, 2012	Evan Thomas	Featured discussion of Thomas's book Ike's Bluff: President Eisenhower's Secret Battle To Save The World
October 21, 2012	Steve Inskeep	Featured discussion of Inskeep's book Instant City: Life and Death in Karachi.
October 28, 2012	Heidi Ewing	Featured discussion of Ewing's documentary Detropia.
November 4, 2012	Walter Stahr	Featured discussion of Stahr's book Seward: Lincoln's Indispensable Man.
November 11, 2012	Matthew Heineman	Featured discussion of Heineman's documentary Escape Fire.
November 18, 2012	Aida Donald	Featured discussion of Donald's book Citizen Soldier: A Life of Harry S. Truman.
November 25, 2012	Ted Widmer	Featured discussion of Widmer's book Listening In: The Secret White House Recordings of John F. Kennedy.
December 2, 2012	Michael Hill	Featured discussion of Hill's book Elihu Washburne: The Diary and Letters of America's Minister to France During The Siege and Commune of Paris.
December 9, 2012	Crystal Wright	Featured discussion of conservativeblackchick.com.
December 16, 2012	Anne Applebaum	Featured discussion of Applebaum's book Iron Curtain: The Crushing of Eastern Europe 1944-1956.
December 23, 2012	Paul Reid	Featured discussion of The Last Lion: Winston Spencer Churchill, Defender of the Realm, 1940-1965, the third volume of William Manchester's trilogy on Winston Churchill, which Manchester asked Reid to finish.
December 30, 2012	Kevin Phillips	Featured discussion of Phillips's book 1775: A Good Year for Revolution.
