= List of C-SPAN Q&A interviews first aired in 2004 and 2005 =

Q&A is an interview series on the C-SPAN network that typically airs every Sunday night. It is hosted by C-SPAN founder Brian Lamb. Its stated purpose is to feature discussions with "interesting people who are making things happen in politics, the media, education, and science & technology in hour-long conversations about their lives and their work."

Original air date (Links to video)	Interviewee(s)	Comments
December 12, 2004	David Levin	This was the first program in the Q&A series, and it was aired one week after the final Booknotes interview, in the time slot that had been reserved for Booknotes. It featured discussion of the Knowledge Is Power Program.
December 19, 2004	Roger Ailes	This interview took place at the studios of the Fox News Channel, on the sets of The O'Reilly Factor and Fox and Friends.
December 26, 2004	Brian Williams	This interview took place in Williams's office at 30 Rockefeller Center.
January 2, 2005	Shirley Ann Jackson	Featured discussion of Jackson's role as president of the Rensselaer Polytechnic Institute.
January 9, 2005	Ronald Peterson	Featured discussion of Johns Hopkins Hospital.
January 16, 2005	William and Jill Ruckelshaus	
January 23, 2005	Eric Liu	
January 30, 2005	George W. Bush	The first 30 minutes of this program was a discussion with President Bush in the Map Room of the White House; The second 30 minutes was a round table discussion with Richard Norton Smith and Douglas Brinkley.
February 6, 2005	Russ Feingold	
February 13, 2005	Mike Huckabee	
February 20, 2005	Rep. Mel Watt	
February 27, 2005	Michael Steele	
March 6, 2005	April Witt	Featured discussion of West Virginia Powerball Lottery winner Jack Whittaker.
March 13, 2005	Barbara Slavin	Featured discussion of Iran–United States relations.
March 20, 2005	David Walker	Featured discussion of Walker's role as Comptroller General of the United States.
March 27, 2005	Paul Weyrich	
April 3, 2005	Peter Beinart	
April 10, 2005	Markos Moulitsas	Featured discussion of The Daily Kos.
April 17, 2005	Thomas Sowell	
April 24, 2005	Dexter Filkins	Featured discussion of journalism in the Iraq War.
May 1, 2005	Charles Krauthammer	
May 8, 2005	Jason Kamras	Featured discussion of Kamras's role as National Teacher of the Year.
May 15, 2005	Linda Chavez-Thompson	Featured discussion of Chavez-Thompson's role as executive vice-president of the AFL-CIO.
May 22, 2005	Josh Bolten	Featured discussion of Bolten's role as director of the Office of Management and Budget.
May 29, 2005	Bob Herbert	
June 5, 2005	Wesley Pruden	
June 12, 2005	Richard Baker	
June 19, 2005	Bethany McLean	Featured discussion of McLean's book Smartest Guys in the Room: The Amazing Rise and Scandalous Fall of Enron.
June 26, 2005	Richard Gilder and Lewis Lehrman	Featured discussion of the Gilder Lehrman Institute of American History.
July 3, 2005	Sarah Bakhiet and Janet Lipson	Featured discussion of C-SPAN's Middle and High School Teacher Fellowship Program. (Bakhiet represented La Jolla Country Day School, La Jolla, California; Lipson represented Long Beach Polytechnic High School, Long Beach, California.)
July 10, 2005	Kenneth Feinberg	Featured discussion of Feinberg's role as Special Master of the September 11th Victim Compensation Fund.
July 17, 2005	Tracy Weber and Charles Ornstein	Featured discussion of the Los Angeles Times investigation of the Martin Luther King Jr./Drew Medical Center.
July 24, 2005	Kenneth Tomlinson	Featured discussion of Tomlinson's role as chairman of the Corporation for Public Broadcasting.
July 31, 2005	Eliot Cohen	Featured discussion of Cohen's op-ed piece in The Washington Post, "A Hawk Questions Himself as His Son Goes to War."
August 7, 2005	David McCullough	The interview was conducted at the General Henry Knox Museum in Thomaston, Maine, and featured discussion of McCullough's book 1776.
August 14, 2005	Robert Kahn	
August 21, 2005	Seeno Merobshoev and Moses Reddy	Merobshoev and Reddy are both C-SPAN employees who emigrated to the United States (Merobshoev from Tajikistan, Reddy from India).
August 28, 2005	Ken Paulson	
September 4, 2005	Sen. Arlen Specter	
September 11, 2005	David O'Brien	Featured discussion of William Rehnquist, John Roberts, and the United States Supreme Court.
September 18, 2005	Allen Weinstein	Featured discussion of Weinstein's role as Archivist of the United States.
September 25, 2005	Jimmy Wales	Featured discussion of Wikipedia.
October 2, 2005	Rep. Artur Davis	
October 9, 2005	Pamela Hess	Featured discussion of Hess's time embedded with American, British, and Italian troops in Iraq.
October 16, 2005	Andrew Card	
October 23, 2005	Rep. Grace Napolitano	
October 30, 2005	Rep. Shelley Moore Capito	
November 6, 2005	Gov. Mark Warner	
November 13, 2005	Chuck Hagel	
November 20, 2005	Bruce Gordon	Featured discussion of Gordon's role as president and CEO of the NAACP.
November 27, 2005	Douglas Holtz-Eakin	Featured discussion of Holtz-Eakin's role as director of the Congressional Budget Office.
December 4, 2005	Stephen Breyer	
December 11, 2005	Laura Ingraham	
December 18, 2005	Randi Rhodes	
December 25, 2005	Sam Brownback	
