= List of C-SPAN Q&A interviews first aired in 2015 =

Q&A is an interview series on the C-SPAN network that typically airs every Sunday night. It is hosted by C-SPAN founder Brian Lamb. Its stated purpose is to feature discussions with "interesting people who are making things happen in politics, the media, education, and science & technology in hour-long conversations about their lives and their work."

Original air date (Links to video)	Interviewee(s)	Comments
January 4, 2015	Janet Murguia	Featured discussion of Murguia's role as president and chief executive officer of National Council of La Raza
January 11, 2015	Dick Lehr	Featured discussion of Lehr's book The Birth of a Nation: How a Legendary Filmmaker and a Crusading Editor Reignited America's Civil War, about the reception of the 1915 film The Birth of a Nation.
January 18, 2015	Dr. Anthony Fauci	Featured discussion of Fauci's role as head of the National Institute of Allergy and Infectious Diseases.
January 25, 2015	Andrew Keen	Featured discussion of Keen's book The Internet is Not the Answer.
February 1, 2015	Dr. Frances Jensen	Featured discussion of Jensen's research on the development of the adolescent brain.
February 8, 2015	David Brooks	Featured discussion of "The Sidney Awards", the annual recognition Brooks gives to pieces of long-form journalism.
February 15, 2015	Thomas Allen Harris	Featured discussion of Harris's documentary film Through a Lens Darkly: Black Photographers and the Emergence of a People.
February 22, 2015	Jan Jarboe Russell	Featured discussion of Russell's book The Train to Crystal City: FDR’s Secret Prisoner Exchange and America’s Only Family Internment Camp During World War II.
March 1, 2015	Anthony Batts	Featured discussion of Batts's experiences leading the police departments of Long Beach, Oakland, and Baltimore.
March 8, 2015	David Stewart	Featured discussion of Stewart's book Madison’s Gift: Five Partnerships That Built America.
March 15, 2015	Dr. Adriane Fugh-Berman	Featured discussion of Fugh-Berman's work as head of PharmedOut.
March 22, 2015	Daniel Bolger	Featured discussion of Bolger's book Why We Lost: A General’s Inside Account of the Iraq and Afghanistan Wars.
March 29, 2015	Erik Larson	Featured discussion of Larson's book Dead Wake: The Last Crossing of the Lusitania.
April 5, 2015	U.S. Senate Youth Program	
April 12, 2015	Andrew Ferguson	
April 19, 2015	Jessica Stern	Featured discussion of Stern's book ISIS: The State of Terror.
April 26, 2015	Judith Miller	Featured discussion of Miller's book The Story: A Reporter’s Journey.
May 3, 2015	Walter Pincus	Featured discussion of Pincus's role as National Security Columnist for the Washington Post.
May 10, 2015	Kate Andersen Brower	Featured discussion of Brower's book The Residence: Inside the Private World of the White House.
May 17, 2015	Chris Hadfield	Featured discussion of Hadfield's career in the Canadian Astronaut Corps and his work on the International Space Station.
May 24, 2015	Michael Witmore	Featured discussion of Witmore's role as head of the Folger Shakespeare Library.
May 31, 2015	David McCullough	Featured discussion of McCullough's book The Wright Brothers.
June 7, 2015	Don Ritchie and Ray Smock	Featured discussion of Ritchie's experience as Historian of the U.S. Senate and Smock's experience as Historian of the U.S. House of Representatives (Part 1 of 2).
June 14, 2015	Dr. Patrick O'Gara	Featured discussion of O'Gara's work in heart surgery and his experiences with the American College of Cardiology. O'Gara is the first cousin of interview host Brian Lamb.
June 21, 2015	Stephen Puleo	Featured discussion of Puleo's book The Caning: The Assault that Drove America to Civil War about the Caning of Charles Sumner.
June 28, 2015	Evan Thomas	Featured discussion of Thomas's book Being Nixon: A Man Divided.
July 5, 2015	Don Ritchie and Ray Smock	Featured discussion of Ritchie's experience as Historian of the U.S. Senate and Smock's experience as Historian of the U.S. House of Representatives (Part 2 of 2).
July 12, 2015	Kristen Soltis Anderson	Featured discussion of Anderson's book The Selfie Vote.
July 19, 2015	Molly Crabapple	
July 26, 2015	Robert Gordon and Morgan Neville	Featured discussion of Gordon and Neville's documentary film Best of Enemies.
August 2, 2015	Robert Kurson	Featured discussion of Kurson's book Pirate Hunters: Treasure, Obsession, and the Search for a Legendary Pirate Ship.
August 9, 2015	Kevyn Orr	Featured discussion of Orr's experiences as emergency manager of the city of Detroit, Michigan.
August 16, 2015	Phyllis Bennis	
August 23, 2015	Kurt Deion	Featured discussion of Deion's visits to the gravesites of all U.S. presidents and vice-presidents.
August 30, 2015	Vanda Felbab-Brown	
September 6, 2015	Deborah Rhode	Featured discussion of Rhode's book The Trouble with Lawyers.
September 13, 2015	Jennifer Teege	Featured discussion of Teege's book My Grandfather Would Have Shot Me: A Black Woman Discovers Her Family’s Nazi Past, about her discovery that her grandfather was Nazi concentration camp commander Amon Göth.
September 20, 2015	Robert Costa	Featured discussion of Costa's reporting on Donald Trump's 2016 presidential campaign.
September 27, 2015	Tom Sherwood	Featured discussion of Sherwood's work in covering political corruption in the Washington D.C. area for WRC-TV.
October 4, 2015	Tony Mauro	Featured discussion of Mauro's companion book to the 2015 C-SPAN series Landmark Cases: 12 Historic Supreme Court Decisions.
October 11, 2015	Gary Hart	Featured discussion of Hart's book The Republic of Conscience.
October 18, 2015	Don Cogman	Featured discussion of Cogman's book Run Mitch, Run.
October 25, 2015	Amy Chozick	Featured discussion of Chozick's reporting on Hillary Clinton's presidential campaign.
November 1, 2015	Jay Nordlinger	Featured discussion of Nordlinger's book Children of Monsters.
November 8, 2015	Eric Metaxas	Featured discussion of Metaxas's writings on the life of Dietrich Bonhoeffer.
November 15, 2015	Stacy Schiff	Featured discussion of Schiff's book The Witches: Salem 1692.
November 22, 2015	Michelle Howard	Featured discussion of Howard's career in the U.S. Navy and her position as a four-star admiral.
November 29, 2015	Ronald Feinman	Featured discussion of Feinman's book Assassinations, Threats, and the American Presidency.
December 6, 2015	N/A	Q&A was preempted by U.S. President Barack Obama's live address on National Security.
December 13, 2015	Betty Caroli	Featured discussion of Caroli's book Lady Bird and Lyndon.
December 20, 2015	Craig Shirley	Featured discussion of Shirley's book Last Act: The Final Years and Legacy of Ronald Reagan.
December 27, 2015	Tyler Abell	Featured discussion of The Drew Pearson Diaries: Vol. II, which was edited by Abell. Abell is also the stepson of the author of the diaries, columnist Drew Pearson.
