= List of C-SPAN Q&A interviews first aired in 2020 =

Q&A is an interview series on the C-SPAN network that typically airs every Sunday night. It is typically hosted by C-SPAN President and co-CEO Susan Swain. Its stated purpose is to feature discussions with "interesting people who are making things happen in politics, the media, education, and science & technology in hour-long conversations about their lives and their work."

Original air date (Links to video)	Interviewee(s)	Comments
January 5, 2020	Daniel Weiss	Featured discussion of Weiss's book In That Time: Michael O'Donnell and the Tragic Era of Vietnam.
January 12, 2020	Donald Ritchie	Featured discussion of the history of impeachment trials in the United States.
January 19, 2020	Joseph McQuaid	Featured discussion of the history of the New Hampshire primaries.
January 26, 2020	David Yepsen	Featured discussion of the history of the "first-in-the-nation" Iowa caucuses.
February 2, 2020	Kathryn Sullivan	Featured discussion of Sullivan's experiences as a member of the NASA's first class of female astronauts.
February 9, 2020	Micheal Lual Mayen	Featured discussion of Mayen's experiences as a South Sudanese refugee and as a video game developer.
February 16, 2020	Craig Fehrman	Featured discussion of Fehrman's book Author in Chief: The Untold Story of Our Presidents and the Books They Wrote.
February 23, 2020	Matthew Green	Featured discussion of Green's book The Speaker of the House: A Study of Leadership, and focused on his analyses of various Speakers of the U.S. House of Representatives.
March 1, 2020	Carl Cannon	Featured discussion of the history of the Super Tuesday primaries and caucuses.
March 8, 2020	Peggy Wallace Kennedy	Featured discussion of Kennedy's book The Broken Road: George Wallace and a Daughter’s Journey to Reconciliation.
March 15, 2020	Steve Inskeep	Featured discussion of Inskeep's book Imperfect Union: How Jessie and John Frémont Mapped the West, Invented Celebrity, and Helped Cause the Civil War.
March 22, 2020	Christian McMillen	Featured discussion of McMillen's book Pandemics: A Very Short Introduction.
March 29, 2020	Amity Shlaes	Featured discussion of governmental responses to economic crises.
April 5, 2020	N/A	Featured a profile of Dr. Anthony Fauci.
April 19, 2020	James Wallner	Featured discussion of U.S. Senate majority leaders.
June 21, 2020	Peniel Joseph	Featured discussion of Joseph's book The Sword and the Shield: The Revolutionary Lives of Malcolm X and Martin Luther King Jr..
June 28, 2020	Elena Conis	Featured discussion of the development of the Polio vaccine.
July 5, 2020	Siddhartha Mukherjee	Featured discussion of the U.S. response to the COVID-19 pandemic.
July 12, 2020	Erin Geiger Smith	Featured discussion of Smith's book Thank You for Voting.
July 19, 2020	John Burtka	Featured discussion of The American Conservative's analysis of the current status of conservatism.
August 2, 2020	Chris Wallace	Featured discussion of Wallace's book Countdown 1945: The Extraordinary Story of the Atomic Bomb and the 116 Days That Changed the World.
August 9, 2020	Reihan Salam	Featured discussion of Salam's role as president of the Manhattan Institute, and of potential long-term impacts of the COVID-19 pandemic on large cities.
August 16, 2020	Elaine Weiss	Featured discussion of Weiss's book The Woman's Hour: The Great Fight to Win the Vote.
August 23, 2020	Katherine Gehl	Featured discussion of Gehl's book The Politics Industry: How Political Innovation Can Break Partisan Gridlock and Save Our Democracy.
August 30, 2020	Harold Holzer	Part one of a discussion of Holzer's book The Endless Battle Between the White House and the Media: From the Founding Fathers to Fake News.
September 13, 2020	Richard Horton	Featured discussion of Horton's role as editor-in-chief of The Lancet.
September 20, 2020	Harold Holzer	Part two of the discussion with Holzer.
September 27, 2020	Eric Jay Dolin	Featured discussion of Dolin's book A Furious Sky: The Five-Hundred-Year History of America's Hurricanes.
October 4, 2020	Ilya Shapiro	Featured discussion of Shaprio's book Supreme Disorder: Judicial Nominations and the Politics of America’s Highest Court.
October 11, 2020	Isabel Wilkerson	Featured discussion of Wilkerson's book Caste: The Origins of Our Discontents.
October 18, 2020	Nic Novicki	Featured discussion of Novicki's work as the founder and director of the Easterseals Disability Film Challenge.
October 25, 2020	Kathleen Belew and Jillian Melchior	Featured discussion of the Proud Boys and Antifa.
November 1, 2020	Matthew Weil and Laura Hautala	Featured discussion of mail-in ballots, election security, and voting machines.
November 8, 2020	David Savage	Featured discussion of the Bush v. Gore Supreme Court case.
November 15, 2020	Sarah Brayne	Featured discussion of law enforcement use of big data and new surveillance technologies.
November 22, 2020	James Taing	Featured discussion of Taing's documentary Ghost Mountain, about the 1979 massacre of Cambodian survivors of Pol Pot's Killing Fields by Thai soldiers along the Thailand-Cambodia border.
December 6, 2020	Susan Schulten and Eric Rauchway	Featured discussion of contentious presidential transitions in U.S. history.
December 13, 2020	Kat Cammack and Sara Jacobs	
December 20, 2020	Jake Wood	Featured discussion of Wood's role as one of the founders of Team Rubicon.
December 27, 2020		
