= List of C-SPAN Q&A interviews first aired in 2006 =

Q&A is an interview series on the C-SPAN network that typically airs every Sunday night. It is hosted by C-SPAN founder Brian Lamb. Its stated purpose is to feature discussions with "interesting people who are making things happen in politics, the media, education, and science & technology in hour-long conversations about their lives and their work."

Original air date (Links to video)	Interviewee(s)	Comments
January 1, 2006	Charles Lewis	
January 8, 2006	Lee Hamilton	
January 15, 2006	Susan Schmidt	
January 22, 2006	Rep. Mike Pence	
January 29, 2006	Jackie Spinner and Jenny Spinner	Featured discussion of the Spinner sisters' book Tell Them I Didn't Cry.
February 5, 2006	Shirley Franklin	
February 12, 2006	A.J. Holloway	Featured discussion of Holloway's role as mayor of Biloxi, Mississippi, and the impact of Hurricane Katrina on his city.
February 19, 2006	Richard Moe	Featured discussion of the National Trust for Historic Preservation.
February 26, 2006	Glenn Reynolds	Featured discussion of Reynolds's blog, Instapundit.
March 5, 2006	Adonal Foyle	Featured discussion of Foyle's organization, Democracy Matters.
March 12, 2006	Keith Olbermann	
March 19, 2006	Gov. Mitt Romney	
March 26, 2006	Mark Cuban	
April 2, 2006	Lt. Col. Karen Kwiatkowski	
April 9, 2006	William Kristol	
April 16, 2006	Michelle Singletary	Featured discussion of Singeltary's "The Color of Money" column in The Washington Post
April 23, 2006	Rachel Bronson	Featured discussion of Bronson's book Thicker than Oil: America's Uneasy Partnership with Saudi Arabia.
April 30, 2006	Richard Carlson	Featured discussion of the Foundation for Defense of Democracies
May 7, 2006	Sean Wilentz	Featured discussion of Wilentz's book The Rise of American Democracy: Jefferson to Lincoln
May 14, 2006	Malcolm Gladwell	
May 21, 2006	Loni Soderberg	Soderberg discussed her role as vice-principal of Hoover High School in San Diego, California, and discussed the impact of No Child Left Behind.
May 28, 2006	Mark Farkas	Featured discussion of Farkas's role as executive producer of the C-SPAN series The Capitol.
June 4, 2006	James Morris	Featured discussion of the U.N. World Food Programme
June 11, 2006	Chalmers Johnson	Featured discussion of Johnson's book The Sorrows of Empire
June 18, 2006	Victoria Nuland	Featured discussion of Nuland's role as U.S. Ambassador to NATO.
June 25, 2006	Jennifer Griffin	
July 2, 2006	Diane Skvarla	Featured discussion of Skvarla's role as Curator of the United States Senate.
July 9, 2006	Mona Charen and Ruth Marcus	
July 16, 2006	Steve James and Sgt. Zack Bazzi	Featured discussion of the film The War Tapes, which was produced by James, and was made up largely of footage filmed by Bazzi and his fellow New Hampshire Army National Guardsmen during their deployment to Iraq.
July 23, 2006	Darryl Matthews	Featured discussion of Matthews's role as General President of the Alpha Phi Alpha fraternity.
July 30, 2006	C-SPAN Teacher Fellows	Featured a discussion with 21 participants in the C-SPAN Teacher Fellows program.
August 6, 2006	Lonnie Bunch	Featured discussion of the National Museum of African American History and Culture
August 13, 2006	Akbar Ahmed	Featured discussion of Ahmed's role as the Chair of Islamic Studies at American University.
August 20, 2006	Robert Spencer	Featured discussion of Spencer's role as director of Jihad Watch.
August 27, 2006	Peter Galbraith	Featured discussion of Galbraith's book The End of Iraq: How American Incompetence Created a War Without End
September 3, 2006	Wes Moore	
September 10, 2006	Glenn Holsten	Featured discussion of Holsten's film The Saint of 9/11, about Father Mychal Judge.
September 17, 2006	Martha Raddatz	
September 24, 2006	Rajiv Chandrasekaran	Featured discussion of Chandrasekaran's book Imperial Life in the Emerald City: Inside Baghdad's Green Zone.
October 1, 2006	Dr. Mark McClellan	
October 8, 2006	Bret Stephens	
October 15, 2006	Andrew Sullivan	Featured discussion of Sullivan's book The Conservative Soul: How We Lost It, How We Get it Back.
October 22, 2006	Michael Weisskopf	
October 29, 2006	Tavis Smiley	
November 5, 2006	James Stern and Adam Del Deo	Featured discussion of Stern and Del Deo's documentary film ...So Goes the Nation.
November 12, 2006	Adrian Fenty	
November 19, 2006	Turki al-Faisal	
November 26, 2006	Christina Sanford and Mark Ward	Featured discussion of the Samuel J. Heyman Service to America Medals
December 3, 2006	John Negroponte	
December 10, 2006	Lt. Gen. Jay Garner	
December 17, 2006	Andrew Rosenthal	
December 24, 2006	Steven Levy	Featured discussion of Levy's book The Perfect Thing: How the iPod Shuffles Commerce, Culture, and Coolness.
December 31, 2006	Gordon Crovitz	
