= List of C-SPAN Q&A interviews first aired in 2013 =

Q&A is an interview series on the C-SPAN network that typically airs every Sunday night. It is hosted by C-SPAN founder Brian Lamb. Its stated purpose is to feature discussions with "interesting people who are making things happen in politics, the media, education, and science & technology in hour-long conversations about their lives and their work."

Original air date (Links to video)	Interviewee(s)	Comments
January 6, 2013	Timothy Naftali	Featured discussion of the oral history project at the Richard Nixon Presidential Library and Museum. (This discussion is continued on the February 17, 2013 program.)
January 13, 2013	Jason Brennan	Featured discussion of Brennan's book, Libertarianism: What Everyone Need to Know.
January 20, 2013	Sheila Bair	Featured discussion of Bair's book Bull By The Horns: Fighting to Save Main Street From Wall Street and Wall Street From Itself.
January 27, 2013	Cathy Lanier	Featured discussion of Lanier's role as Chief of the Metropolitan Police Department of the District of Columbia.
February 3, 2013	Mark Shields	
February 10, 2013	Amity Shlaes	Featured discussion of Shlaes's biography of Calvin Coolidge.
February 17, 2013	Timothy Naftali	Featured discussion of the oral history project at the Richard Nixon Presidential Library and Museum. (This discussion is a continuation of the discussion from the January 6, 2013 program.)
February 24, 2013	Keith Richburg	
March 3, 2013	Bill Steigerwald	Featured discussion of Steigerwald's book Dogging Steinbeck: Discovering America and Exposing The Truth About "Travels With Charley", about John Steinbeck's book Travels with Charley.
March 10, 2013	Jody Williams	Featured discussion of Williams's book My Name is Jody Williams.
March 17, 2013	Fred Barnes	Featured discussion of Barnes's role as executive editor of the Weekly Standard.
March 24, 2013	Dr. Francis Collins	
March 31, 2013	Medea Benjamin	Featured discussion of Benjamin's book Drone Warfare: Killing by Remote Control.
April 7, 2013	Tom Korologos	
April 14, 2013	U.S. Senate Youth Program	
April 21, 2013	Rajiv Chandrasekaran	Featured discussion of Chandrasekaran's Washington Post article "Too Big to Bail", about the Joint Strike Fighter program.
April 28, 2013	Bob Ney	Featured discussion of Ney's book Sideswiped: Lessons Learned Courtesy of the Hit Men of Capitol Hill.
May 5, 2013	David Stockman	Featured discussion of Stockman's book The Great Deformation: The Corruption of Capitalism in America.
May 12, 2013	Scott Shane	Featured discussion of Shane's New York Times Sunday feature story "From Spy to Source to Convict" about former CIA officer John Kiriakou.
May 19, 2013	S. James Gates, Jr.	
May 26, 2013	Tom Goldstein	Featured discussion of Goldstein's website SCOTUSblog.
June 2, 2013	Shola Lynch	Featured discussion of Lunch's documentary Free Angela and All Political Prisoners about Angela Davis.
June 9, 2013	Robin Nagle	Featured discussion of Nagle's book Picking Up: On the Streets and Behind the Trucks with the Sanitation Workers of New York City
June 16, 2013	Patrick Gavin	Featured discussion of Gavin's role as a reporter for Politico.
June 23, 2013	Yuval Levin	Featured discussion of Levin's role as editor of National Affairs.
June 30, 2013	Charles Bolden	Featured discussion of Bolden's role as NASA Administrator.
July 7, 2013	Richard Baker	Featured discussion of Baker's book The American Senate: An Insider's History.
July 14, 2013	George Packer	Featured discussion of Packer's book The Unwinding: An Inner History of the New America.
July 21, 2013	John Taliaferro	Featured discussion of Taliaferro's book All The Great Prizes: The Life of John Hay, from Lincoln to Roosevelt, about John Hay.
July 28, 2013	Jack Doyle	Featured discussion of Doyle's website, PopHistoryDig.com.
August 4, 2013	William Seale	Featured discussion of Seale's participation in the C-SPAN series First Ladies: Influence and Image.
August 11, 2013	Nikita Stewart	Featured discussion of Stewart's Washington Post article, "The Governor of D.C.: The Rise of Jeffrey E. Thompson and the Fall That Has Rattled District Politics".
August 18, 2013	Mark Leibovich	Featured discussion of Leibovich's book This Town: Two Parties and a Funeral - Plus Plenty of Valet Parking! - In America's Gilded Capital.
August 25, 2013	Amanda Terkel	Featured discussion of Terkel's appearance at the Netroots Nation Annual Conference where she spoke on the “Political Opponents Caught on Tape” panel.
September 1, 2013	Charlie Cook	Featured discussion of Cook's career and newsletter.
September 8, 2013	A. Scott Berg	Featured discussion of Wilson, Berg's biography of Woodrow Wilson.
September 15, 2013	Andrew Bacevich	Featured discussion of Bacevich's book, Breach of Trust: How Americans Failed Their Soldiers and Their Country.
September 22, 2013	Phyllis Fong	Featured discussion of Fong's work as Inspector General at the United States Department of Agriculture, and her leadership of the Council of Inspectors General on Integrity and Efficiency.
September 29, 2013	Toby Cosgrove	Featured discussion of Cosgrove's role as President and CEO of The Cleveland Clinic.
October 6, 2013	Josh Bolten	Featured part one of a discussion of Bolten's role as White House Chief of Staff in the George W. Bush Administration.
October 13, 2013	Josh Bolten	Featured part two of a discussion of Bolten's role as White House Chief of Staff in the George W. Bush Administration.
October 20, 2013	Tevi Troy	Featured discussion of Troy's book What Jefferson Read, Ike Watched, and Obama Tweeted: 200 Years of Popular Culture in the White House.
October 27, 2013	Jonathan Goodman Levitt	Featured discussion of Levitt's documentary Follow the Leader.
November 3, 2013	Stephen Kinzer	Featured discussion of Kinzer's book The Brothers: John Foster Dulles, Allen Dulles, and Their Secret World War, about John Foster Dulles and Allen Dulles.
November 10, 2013	Gregg Easterbrook	Featured discussion of Easterbrook's book The King of Sports: Football's Impact on America.
November 17, 2013	Doris Kearns Goodwin	Featured discussion of Goodwin's book The Bully Pulpit: Theodore Roosevelt, William Howard Taft, and the Golden Age of Journalism.
November 24, 2013	Josh Sapan	Featured discussion of Sapan's book The Big Picture.
December 1, 2013	Hassan Tetteh	Featured discussion of Tetteh's novel Gifts of the Heart, and of his experiences as a U.S. Navy surgeon in Afghanistan.
December 8, 2013	David Finkel	Featured discussion of Finkel's book Thank You For Your Service.
December 15, 2013	Margaret MacMillan	Featured discussion of MacMillan's book The War That Ended Peace: The Road to 1914.
December 22, 2013	Patty Stonesifer	Featured discussion of Stonesifer's role as President and CEO of Martha's Kitchen.
December 29, 2013	Hugh Hewitt	Featured discussion of Hewitt's book The Happiest Life.
