= List of C-SPAN Q&A interviews first aired in 2014 =

Q&A is an interview series on the C-SPAN network that typically airs every Sunday night. It is hosted by C-SPAN founder Brian Lamb. Its stated purpose is to feature discussions with "interesting people who are making things happen in politics, the media, education, and science & technology in hour-long conversations about their lives and their work."

Original air date (Links to video)	Interviewee(s)	Comments
January 5, 2014	Marty Sullivan	Featured discussion of Sullivan's role as chief economist for Tax Analysts.
January 12, 2014	David Bobb	Featured discussion of Bobb's book Humility: An Unlikely Biography of America’s Greatest Virtue.
January 19, 2014	Doug Mills	
January 26, 2014	Jehane Noujaim	Featured discussion of Noujaim's documentary The Square.
February 2, 2014	Robert Dallek	Featured discussion of Dallek's book Camelot’s Court: Inside the Kennedy White House.
February 9, 2014	Bernard Tate	Featured discussion of Tate's role coordinating C-SPAN's coverage of the British Parliament.
February 16, 2014	Lee Ellis	Featured discussion of Ellis's book Leading With Honor: Leadership Lessons from the Hanoi Hilton
February 23, 2014	Mike Lofgren	Featured discussion of Lofgren's book The Party Is Over: How Republicans Went Crazy, Democrats Became Useless, and the Middle Class Got Shafted.
March 2, 2014	Virginia Postrel	Featured discussion of Postrel's book The Power of Glamour: Longing and the Art of Visual Persuasion
March 9, 2014	Mary Jo White	Featured discussion of White's role as chairperson of the Securities and Exchange Commission
March 16, 2014	Cass Sunstein	Featured discussion of Sunstein's role as Why Nudge? The Politics of Libertarian Paternalism
March 23, 2014	Ibis Sánchez-Serrano	Featured discussion of Sánchez-Serrano's book The World’s Health Care Crisis.
March 30, 2014	Betty Medsger	Featured discussion of The Burglary: The Discovery of J. Edgar Hoover’s Secret FBI.
April 6, 2014	Matt Taibbi	Featured discussion of The Divide: American Injustice in the Age of the Wealth Gap.
April 13, 2014	Tom Coburn	
April 20, 2014	William Cohan	Featured discussion of Cohan's book The Price of Silence: The Duke Lacrosse Scandal, the Power of the Elite, and the Corruption of Our Great Universities.
April 25, 2014	Stuart Taylor	Featured discussion of Until Proven Innocent: Political Correctness and the Shameful Injustices of the Duke Lacrosse Rape Case. This interview was atypical in that it aired on a Friday, and was a direct response to the interview with William Cohen that aired on April 20. (Taylor's book took an alternate view of the Duke lacrosse case from the view of Cohen's book.)
April 27, 2014	U.S. Senate Youth Program	
May 4, 2014	Myra MacPherson	Featured discussion of MacPherson's book The Scarlet Sisters: Sex, Suffrage, and Scandal in the Gilded Age.
May 11, 2014	Evan Osnos	Featured discussion of Osnos's book Age of Ambition: Chasing Fortune, Truth, and Faith in the New China.
May 18, 2014	Ralph Nader	Featured discussion of Nader's book Unstoppable: The Emerging Left-Right Alliance to Dismantle the Corporate State.
May 25, 2014	John Sopko	Featured discussion of Sopko's role as Special Inspector General for Afghanistan Reconstruction.
June 1, 2014	Bret Baier	Featured discussion of Baier's book Special Heart: A Journey of Faith, Hope, Courage and Love.
June 8, 2014	George Miller	Featured discussion of Miller's career in the U.S. House of Representatives
June 15, 2014	Lisa Myers	
June 22, 2014	Sharyl Attkisson	
June 29, 2014	Daniel Schulman	Featured discussion of Schulman's book Sons of Wichita: How the Koch Brothers Became America's Most Powerful and Private Dynasty.
July 6, 2014	Wayne A. I. Frederick	Featured discussion of Frederick's role as president of Howard University.
July 13, 2014	George Will	Featured discussion of Will's book A Nice Little Place on the North Side: Wrigley Field at 100
July 20, 2014	Fred Kaplan	Featured discussion of Kaplan's book John Quincy Adams: American Visionary.
July 27, 2014	Michele Flournoy	
August 3, 2014	Sylvia Jukes Morris	Featured discussion with Morris on her book Price of Fame: The Honorable Clare Boothe Luce.
August 10, 2014	Edmund Morris	Featured discussion with Morris on his book This Living Hand: And Other Essays
August 17, 2014	Pat Buchanan	Featured discussion of Buchanan's book The Greatest Comeback: How Richard Nixon Rose from Defeat to Create the New Majority.
August 24, 2014	Charlie Rangel	Featured discussion of Rangel's career in the U.S. House of Representatives.
August 31, 2014	Robert Katzmann	Featured discussion of Katzmann's book Judging Statutes.
September 7, 2014	David Fahrenthold	Featured discussion of Farenthold's Washington Post article about Medicare fraud.
September 14, 2014	Rick Perlstein	Featured discussion of Perlstein's book The Invisible Bridge: The Fall of Nixon and the Rise of Reagan
September 21, 2014	Jenny Beth Martin	Featured discussion of Martin's book Tea Party Patriots: The Second American Revolution
September 28, 2014	Sally Quinn	
October 5, 2014	Johnnetta Cole	Featured discussion of Cole's role as director of the Smithsonian's National Museum of African Art.
October 12, 2014	Bob Timberg	Featured discussion of Timberg's memoir Blue Eyed Boy.
October 19, 2014	Richard Norton Smith	Featured discussion of Smith's biography of Nelson Rockefeller, On His Own Terms: A Life of Nelson Rockefeller.
October 26, 2014	Rory Kennedy	Featured discussion of Kennedy's documentary film Last Days in Vietnam, about the Fall of Saigon and Operation Frequent Wind
November 2, 2014	Harold Holzer	Featured discussion of Holzer's book Lincoln and the Power of the Press: The War for Public Opinion.
November 9, 2014	Tavis Smiley	Featured discussion of Smiley's book Death of a King: The Real Story of Dr. Martin Luther King Jr.'s Final Year.
November 16, 2014	Nonie Darwish	
November 23, 2014	David Mark	Featured discussion of Mark's book Dog Whistles, Walk-Backs and Washington Handshakes: Decoding the Jargon, Slang and Bluster of American Political Speech
November 30, 2014	James Risen	
December 7, 2014	Ann Compton	
December 14, 2014	John Bresnahan and Manu Raju	
December 21, 2014	Katie Pavlich	
December 28, 2014	Glenn Kessler	
