= List of C-SPAN Q&A interviews first aired in 2016 =

Q&A is an interview series on the C-SPAN network that typically airs every Sunday night. It is hosted by C-SPAN founder Brian Lamb. Its stated purpose is to feature discussions with "interesting people who are making things happen in politics, the media, education, and science & technology in hour-long conversations about their lives and their work."

Original air date (link to video)	Interviewee(s)	Comments
January 3, 2016	Michael Ramirez	Featured discussion of Ramirez's work as an editorial cartoonist.
January 10, 2016	Marty Baron	Featured discussion of Baron's work as editor of The Boston Globe and The Washington Post.
January 17, 2016	Aviva Kempner	Featured discussion of Kempner's documentary Rosenwald about the life of Julius Rosenwald.
January 24, 2016	Carlos Lozada	Featured discussion of books written by candidates in the 2016 U.S. presidential election.
January 31, 2016	Scott Christianson	Featured discussion of Christianson's book 100 Documents that Changed the World: From the Magna Carta to Wikileaks.
February 7, 2016	Jesse Holland	Featured discussion of Holland's book The Invisibles: The Untold Story of African American Slaves in the White House.
February 14, 2016	Robert Gates	Featured discussion of Gates's book A Passion for Leadership.
February 21, 2016	Bill Press	Featured discussion of Press's book Buyer's Remorse: How Obama Let Progressives Down.
February 28, 2016	Thomas Schatz	Featured discussion of Schatz's experiences as president of Citizens Against Government Waste.
March 6, 2016	Robert Kaplan	Featured discussion of Kaplan's book In Europe’s Shadow: Two Cold Wars and a Thirty-Year Journey Through Romania and Beyond.
March 13, 2016	Peter Baker and Susan Glasser	
March 20, 2016	Gabe Roth	Executive director of Fix the Court, a judicial advocacy group
March 27, 2016	Robert J. Gordon	Featured discussion of Gordon's book The Rise and Fall of American Growth.
April 3, 2016	U.S. Senate Youth Program	
April 10, 2016	Mary Sarah Bilder	Featured discussion of Bilder's book Madison’s Hand: Revising the Constitutional Convention.
April 17, 2016	Sally Denton	Featured discussion of Denton's book The Profiteers: Bechtel and the Men Who Built the World, about Bechtel.
April 24, 2016	Ron Chernow	Featured discussion of the musical Hamilton, which was based on Chernow's 2004 biography of Alexander Hamilton.
May 1, 2016	Amy Goodman	
May 8, 2016	Zalmay Khalilzad	Featured discussion of Khalilzad's memoir, The Envoy: From Kabul to the White House, My Journey Through a Turbulent World.
May 15, 2016	Adam Hochschild	Featured discussion of Hochschild's book Spain In Our Hearts: Americans in the Spanish Civil War, 1936-1939.
May 22, 2016	Michael Kinsley	Featured discussion of Kinsley's book Old Age: A Beginners Guide.
May 29, 2016	Betty Koed	Featured discussion of Koed's work as Historian of the United States Senate.
June 5, 2016	Tammy Baldwin	Featured discussion of Baldwin's experiences as a U.S. Senator from Wisconsin.
June 12, 2016	Simon Sebag Montefiore	Featured discussion of Montefiore's book The Romanovs: 1613-1918.
June 19, 2006	Jo Ann Jenkins	Featured discussion of Jenkins's book Disrupt Aging: A Bold New Path to Living Your Best Life at Every Age and her work as CEO of the AARP.
June 26, 2016	Arthur Herman	Featured discussion of Herman's book Douglas MacArthur: American Warrior.
July 3, 2016 (Part 1); July 3, 2016 (Part 2)	Mark Green	Featured discussion of Green's book Bright, Infinite Future: A Generational Memoir on the Progressive Rise.
July 10, 2016	Gerard Robinson	Featured discussion of Robinson's roles as Florida Education Commissioner and Virginia Secretary of Education.
July 17, 2016	Corey Pegues	Featured discussion of Pegues's book Once a Cop: The Street, the Law, Two Worlds, One Man about his career with the New York City Police Department.
July 24, 2016	Jean Edward Smith	Featured discussion of Smith's book Bush, about former president George W. Bush.
July 31, 2016	Joshua Kendall	Featured discussion of Kendall's book First Dads.
August 7, 2016	James Robertson	Featured discussion of After the Civil War: The Heroes, Villains, Soldiers, and Civilians Who Changed America.
August 14, 2016	Clifton Raphael	Featured discussion of Raphael's experiences teaching film and television production at Jenks High School in Jenks, Oklahoma.
August 21, 2016	Nancy Isenberg	Featured discussion of Isenberg's book White Trash: The 400-Year Untold History of Class in America.
August 28, 2016	Laurence Leamer	Featured discussion of Leamer's books, including his 2016 book The Lynching.
September 4, 2016	Tom Fitton	Featured discussion of Fitton's book Clean House: Exposing Our Government's Secrets and Lies.
September 11, 2016	David Cay Johnston	Featured discussion of Johnston's book The Making of Donald Trump.
September 18, 2016	James Traub	Featured discussion of Traub's book John Quincy Adams: Militant Spirit.
September 25, 2016	Robert J. Samuelson	Featured discussion of Samuelson's writings on economics as a columnist for the Washington Post.
October 2, 2016	John Podhoretz	Featured discussion of Podhoretz's writings as a movie reviewer for The Weekly Standard.
October 9, 2016	N/A	Q&A was not aired due to the second presidential debate of the 2016 U.S. presidential election.
October 16, 2016	Maureen Dowd	
October 23, 2016	JD Vance	Featured discussion of Vance's memoir Hillbilly Elegy.
October 30, 2016	Larry Tye	Featured discussion of Bobby Kennedy: Making of a Liberal Icon.
November 6, 2016	Candice Millard	Featured discussion of Millard's book Hero of the Empire: The Boer War, a Daring Escape, and the Making of Winston Churchill.
November 13, 2016	Stephen Puleo	Featured discussion of Puleo's book American Treasures.
November 20, 2016	Okey Ndibe	Featured discussion of Ndibe's book Never Look an American in the Eye: Flying Turtles, Colonial Ghosts, and the Making of a Nigerian American.
November 27, 2016	Edward Larson	Featured discussion of Larson's book George Washington, Nationalist.
December 4, 2016	Ronald White	Featured discussion of White's book American Ulysses: A Life of Ulysses S. Grant.
December 11, 2016	Brian Gruber	Featured discussion of Gruber's book War: The Afterparty - A Global Walkabout Through a Half-Century of U.S. Military Interventions.
December 18, 2016	Robert Strauss	Featured discussion of Strauss's book Worst. President. Ever.: James Buchanan, the POTUS Rating Game, and the Legacy of the Least of the Lesser Presidents.
December 25, 2016	Mark Danner	Featured discussion of Danner's book Spiral: Trapped in the Forever War.
