= List of C-SPAN Q&A interviews first aired in 2009 =

Q&A is an interview series on the C-SPAN network that typically airs every Sunday night. It is hosted by C-SPAN founder Brian Lamb. Its stated purpose is to feature discussions with "interesting people who are making things happen in politics, the media, education, and science & technology in hour-long conversations about their lives and their work."

Original air date (Links to video)	Interviewee(s)	Comments
January 4, 2009	Robert Caro	Featured discussion of Caro's multi-volume biography of Lyndon Johnson, The Years of Lyndon Johnson.
January 11, 2009	Rep. Larry Kissell and Rep. Anh "Joseph" Cao	
January 18, 2009	Carol and Tom Wheeler	Featured discussion of the Presidential transition of Barack Obama
January 25, 2009	John Doar	
February 1, 2009	Eliot Cohen	
February 8, 2009	Stephanie Miller	
February 15, 2009	Maryjane Behforouz	Featured discussion of the Mar Elias Campus.
February 22, 2009	Rep. Barbara Lee	Featured discussion of Lee's book Renegade for Peace & Justice.
March 1, 2009	Matthew Continetti	
March 8, 2009	Erica Williams	Featured discussion of Campus Progress.
March 15, 2009	Cliff Groh	Featured discussion of the trial of Ted Stevens
March 22, 2009	Rich Mauer	Featured discussion of the trial of Ted Stevens
March 29, 2009	Sharyl Attkisson	
April 5, 2009	Dambisa Moyo	Featured discussion of Moyo's book Dead Aid: Why Aid Is Not Working and How There Is a Better Way for Africa.
April 12, 2009	Mona Charen and Ruth Marcus	
April 19, 2009	Janet Tavakoli	Featured discussion of Tavakoli's book "Dear Mr. Buffett: What an Investor Learns 1,269 Miles from Wall Street.
April 26, 2009	Christopher Hitchens	
May 3, 2009	Evan Osnos	
May 10, 2009	Ross Douthat	
May 17, 2009	Melanie Sloan	Featured discussion of Sloane's role as executive director of Citizens for Responsibility and Ethics in Washington.
May 24, 2009	Tom Fitton	Featured discussion of Fitton's role as president of Judicial Watch.
May 31, 2009	Colbert King	
June 7, 2009	Gov. Mitch Daniels	
June 14, 2009	Larry Arnn	Featured discussion of Arnn's role as president of Hillsdale College.
June 21, 2009	Douglas Brinkley	Part one of interview with Brinkley about his book The Wilderness Warrior: Theodore Roosevelt and the Crusade for America.
June 28, 2009	Douglas Brinkley	Part two of interview with Brinkley about his book The Wilderness Warrior: Theodore Roosevelt and the Crusade for America.
July 5, 2009	Walter Kirn	Featured discussion of Kirn's book Lost in the Meritocracy: The Undereducation of an Overachiever.
July 12, 2009	Allis & Ronald Radosh	Featured discussion of the Radoshes' book A Safe Haven: Harry S. Truman and The Founding of Israel.
July 19, 2009	Walt Mossberg	
July 26, 2009	Susan Jacoby	Featured discussion of Jacoby's book Alger Hiss and the Battle for History.
August 2, 2009	Bruce Chadwick	Featured discussion of Chadwick's book I Am Murdered: George Wythe, Thomas Jefferson, and the Killing that Shocked a New Nation.
August 9, 2009	Frank Rich	
August 16, 2009	Ellis Cose	
August 23, 2009	Frank Mankiewicz	
August 30, 2009	Dr. John Garrett	Featured discussion of Garrett's roles as Chief of Cardiac Surgery and Chairman of the Board of Directors at the Virginia Hospital Center.
September 6, 2009	T.R. Reid	Featured discussion of Reid's book The Healing of America: A Global Quest for Better, Cheaper, and Fairer Health Care.
September 13, 2009	Christopher Caldwell	Featured discussion of Caldwell's book Reflections on the Revolution in Europe: Immigration, Islam, and the West.
September 20, 2009	Neil Sheehan	Featured discussion of Sheehan's book A Fiery Peace in a Cold War: Bernard Schriever and the Ultimate Weapon.
September 27, 2009	Richard Baker	
October 4, 2009	Mark Farkas	Featured discussion of C-SPAN's documentary on the United States Supreme Court.
October 11, 2009	Tracy Kidder	Featured discussion of Kidder's book Strength in What Remains: A Journey of Remembrance and Forgiveness.
October 18, 2009	S.E. Cupp	
October 25, 2009	Barry Black	Featured discussion of Black's role as Chief of Chaplains of the United States Navy.
November 1, 2009	Ken Auletta	Featured discussion of Auletta's book Googled: The End of the World as We Know It.
November 8, 2009	Melvin Urofsky	Featured discussion of Urofsky's biography of Louis Brandeis.
November 15, 2009	Raymond Smock	
November 22, 2009	Judy Shelton	
November 29, 2009	Naomi Klein	
December 6, 2009	Malcolm Gladwell	
December 13, 2009	Michael Fauntroy	
December 20, 2009	Robert W. Merry	Featured discussion of Merry's book A Country of Vast Designs: James K. Polk, the Mexican War and the Conquest of the American Continent.
December 27, 2009	Omar Wasow	Featured discussion of BlackPlanet.com.
