= Robert Titsch =

American businessman

Robert Titsch is an American businessman who is credited as a co-founder of the American political television network C-SPAN. At the time of the founding of C-SPAN, he was the publisher of Cablevision magazine where C-SPAN founder Brian Lamb served as the Washington bureau chief. Titsch served on the first board of directors of C-SPAN.

Titsch is from Denver, Colorado. He has been in the publishing and businesses since 1969. He has been living in Coeur d'Alene, Idaho.
