= List of C-SPAN Q&A interviews first aired in 2018 =

Q&A is an interview series on the C-SPAN network that typically airs every Sunday night. It is hosted by C-SPAN founder Brian Lamb. Its stated purpose is to feature discussions with "interesting people who are making things happen in politics, the media, education, and science & technology in hour-long conversations about their lives and their work."

| Original air date (Links to video) | Interviewee(s) | Comments |
|---|---|---|
| January 7, 2018 | Hendrik Meijer | Featured discussion of Meijer's book Arthur Vandenberg: The Man in the Middle of the American Century, about Michigan Senator Arthur Vandenberg. |
| January 14, 2018 | A. J. Baime | Featured discussion with Baime about his book The Accidental President: Harry S. Truman and the Four Months That Changed the World, about the first four months of the presidency of Harry S. Truman. |
| January 21, 2018 | Noah Feldman | Featured discussion of Feldman's book The Three Lives of James Madison. |
| January 28, 2018 | Caitriona Perry | Featured discussion of Perry's book In America. |
| February 4, 2018 | Bill James | Featured discussion of James's book The Man from the Train. |
| February 11, 2018 | Doug Mills | Featured discussion of Mills's work as a photojournalist, and his coverage of the presidencies and / or campaigns of Barack Obama, Hillary Clinton, and Donald Trump. |
| February 18, 2018 | Michael Fabey | Featured discussion of Fabey's book Crashback: The Power Clash Between the U.S. and China in the Pacific. |
| February 25, 2018 | Kate Bowler | Featured discussion of Bowler's memoir Everything Happens for a Reason: And Other Lies I've Loved. |
| March 4, 2018 | Joshua Zeitz | Featured discussion of Zeitz's book Building the Great Society: Inside Lyndon Johnson’s White House. |
| March 11, 2018 | Francisco Cantú | Featured discussion of Cantú's book The Line Becomes a River. |
| March 18, 2018 | Thomas Cronin | Featured discussion of Cronin's book Imagining a Great Republic: Political Novels and the Idea of America. |
| March 25, 2018 | Amy Chua | Featured discussion of Chua's book Political Tribes: Group Instinct and the Fate of Nations. |
| April 1, 2018 | U.S. Senate Youth Program | |
| April 8, 2018 | Michio Kaku | Featured discussion of Kaku's book The Future of Humanity: Terraforming Mars, Interstellar Travel, Immortality, and Our Destiny Beyond Earth. |
| April 15, 2018 | Niall Ferguson | Featured discussion of Ferguson's book The Square and the Tower. |
| April 22, 2018 | Etan Thomas | Featured discussion of Thomas's book We Matter: Athletes and Activism. |
| April 29, 2018 | Lillian Cunningham | Featured discussion of Cunningham's "Presidential" and "Constitutional" podcasts. |
| May 6, 2018 | Robert Kurson | Featured discussion of Kurson's book Rocket Men, about the Apollo 8 mission. |
| May 13, 2018 | Yunte Huang | Featured discussion of Huang's book Inseparable: The Original Siamese Twins and Their Rendezvous with American History, about conjoined twins Chang and Eng Bunker. |
| May 20, 2018 | William Hitchcock | Featured discussion of Hitchcock's book The Age of Eisenhower: America and the World in the 1950s. |
| May 27, 2018 | John Lewis Gaddis | Featured discussion of Gaddis's book On Grand Strategy. |
| June 3, 2018 | Patricia O'Toole | Featured discussion of O'Toole's book The Moralist: Woodrow Wilson and the World He Made. |
| June 10, 2018 | Ross Douthat | Featured discussion of Douthat's book To Change the Church: Pope Francis and the Future of Catholicism. |
| June 17, 2018 | Joe Tropea and Skizz Cyzyk | Featured discussion of Tropea and Cyzyk's documentary Hit & Stay: A History of Faith and Resistance, about the Catonsville 9. |
| June 24, 2018 | Amy Wax | Featured discussion of free expression on college campuses. |
| July 1, 2018 | Mona Charen | Featured discussion of Charen's book Sex Matters: How Modern Feminism Lost Touch with Science, Love, and Common Sense. |
| July 8, 2018 | Tom Dunkel | Featured discussion of Dunkel's Washington Post article about the sons of Rev. Sun Myung Moon. |
| July 15, 2018 | Gregory Watson | Featured discussion of Watson's role in the ratification of the Twenty-seventh Amendment to the United States Constitution. |
| July 22, 2018 | Grace Kennan Warnecke | Featured discussion of Warnecke's book Daughter of the Cold War. |
| July 29, 2018 | David O. Stewart | Featured discussion of Stewart's book Impeached: The Trial of President Andrew Johnson and the Fight for Lincoln's Legacy. |
| August 5, 2018 | Richard Baker, Donald Ritchie, Ray Smock | Featured discussion of aspects of the history of the United States Congress. |
| August 12, 2018 | Ginger Thompson | Featured discussion of Thompson's reporting for ProPublica on various issues related to U.S.-Mexico relations. |
| August 18, 2018 | John Ferling | Featured discussion of Ferling's book Apostles of Revolution: Jefferson, Paine, Monroe, and the Struggle Against the Old Order in America and Europe. |
| August 25, 2018 | Jeffrey Rosen | Featured discussion of Rosen's biography of William Howard Taft. |
| September 2, 2018 | Charles W. Calhoun | Featured discussion of Calhoun's biography of Benjamin Harrison. |
| September 9, 2018 | Zachary Wood | Featured discussion of Wood's book Uncensored: My Life and Uncomfortable Conversations at the Intersection of Black and White America. |
| September 16, 2018 | Richard Norton Smith | Featured discussion of Smith's biography of Herbert Hoover, An Uncommon Man. |
| September 23, 2018 | Major Garrett | Featured discussion of Garrett's book Mr. Trump's Wild Ride. |
| September 30, 2018 | Jeffrey Engel | Featured discussion of Engel's book When the World Seemed New: George H. W. Bush and the End of the Cold War. |
| October 7, 2018 | Joanne Freeman | Featured discussion of Freeman's book The Field of Blood: Violence in Congress and the Road to Civil War. |
| October 14, 2018 | Tucker Carlson | Featured discussion of Carlson's book Ship of Fools: How a Selfish Ruling Class Is Bringing America to the Brink of Revolution. |
| October 21, 2018 | Joel Richard Paul | Featured discussion of Paul's book, Without Precedent: Chief Justice John Marshall and His Times. |
| October 28, 2018 | James Mann | Featured discussion of Mann's biography of George W. Bush. |
| November 4, 2018 | David Levering Lewis | Featured discussion of Lewis's book The Improbable Wendell Willkie. |
| November 11, 2018 | Michael Gerhardt | Featured discussion of Gerhardt's book The Forgotten Presidents, in particular, aspects of the Presidency of Jimmy Carter. |
| November 18, 2018 | Jackie Speier | Featured discussion of Speier's book Undaunted: Surviving Jonestown, Summoning Courage, and Fighting Back, about her experiences accompanying Congressman Leo Ryan to investigate the Peoples Temple settlement at Jonestown. |
| November 25, 2018 | Ted Widmer | Featured discussion of Widmer's biography of Martin Van Buren. |
| December 2, 2018 | Douglas Brinkley, Edna Greene Medford, and Russell Shorto | |
| December 9, 2018 | Peter Osnos | |
| December 16, 2018 | Sarah Churchwell | Featured discussion of Churchwell's book Behold, America. |
| December 23, 2018 | Holman Jenkins | Featured discussion of Jenkins's experiences as a columnist for the Wall Street Journal. |
| December 30, 2018 | Mark Farkas | Featured discussion of the C-SPAN program The Senate: Conflict and Compromise. |
