= John D. Evans =

American business executive and philanthropist

- Education: University of Michigan
- Occupations: Business executive, philanthropist
- Known for: Co-founder of C-SPAN
- Parent(s): Edward S. Evans, Jr
- Relatives: Robert B. Evans
- Awards: Courage in Business Award, Distinguished Alumnus Award

John D. Evans is an American business executive and philanthropist, best known for his role as one of the co-founders of the C-SPAN television network.

== Business career ==
=== Military ===
Evans served in the US Navy, achieving the rank of lieutenant during his career. He served aboard the aircraft carriers USS America and USS John F. Kennedy, was a television project head in the Navy project SEALAB, and served on the staff of the Chief of Naval Operations at The Pentagon.

=== Telecommunications ===
Evans founded Evans Communications System after his career in the Navy, starting with two radio licenses in Charlottesville, Virginia. In 1972 he became a regional manager of the largest operating region of the predecessor of the Time Warner company, and eventually took the job of chief operating officer for Arlington Cable Partners. As an investor in the company, he helped build the first cable system in the Washington D.C. area.

A 2016 inductee into the Cable Television Industry's Hall of Fame, Evans is perhaps best known for his role in co-founding the public affairs cable network C-SPAN, which put cameras in the halls and legislature of the US Congress to document the legislative work of America's elected officials for the first time. The network came about through a conversation he had with a former navy buddy of his Brian Lamb, who shared his idea of an all-Congress television station with Evans in July 1977. Evans then helped Lamb found and develop the network. Evans' chief occupation at the time was President of Arlington TeleCommunications Corp, as he helped to expand the idea for a more locally oriented network to one that had major access to the halls of Congress. In the 1980s, Evans also became President of Hauser Communications when it acquired Arlington TeleCommunications Corp and changed its name to Arlington Cable Partners, and continued to serve on the board of C-SPAN. After being named Chairman of C-SPAN's Executive Committee (1992-1994), he helped draft a new plan named "C-SPAN 2000" to provide new strategic direction, implemented as Evans was chairman of the board for C-SPAN itself in the early 1990s. During his tenure as Chairman, C-SPAN was the winner of several Golden Cable ACE awards, a Peabody Award, and a Golden Beacon Award.

By the mid-1980s Evans was serving as chairman and CEO of Evans Telecommunications. He also served on the boards of the National Cable Television Association, the Washington Metropolitan Cable Club, and Falcon Cable Holdings. Since helping to found C-SPAN, Evans has appeared on the network more than 100 times. Today he continues to serve as Chief Executive Officer and Chairman of Evans Telecommunications Co, The John D. Evans Foundation, as Founding Director of the National Cable Satellite Corporation and Director of National Cable & Telecommunications Association. He is also on the board of Internet2, a consortium of 221 US Universities operating an 8.8 Terabit capacity research and education network. From 2013-2017, Evans was Industry representative to the board of Trustees of the Digital Preservation Network. In 2009 Evans was named Entrepreneur of the Year by Washington & Jefferson College.

In 2005 Evans was invited by Emory University to consult with Emory committees and serve on a Futurist Forum Panel to help Emory develop its strategic plan.

=== Other Business Activities ===
In 1992, Evans bought Waterford Farm in Middleburg, Virginia and began breeding cattle. He is also an investor and serves on the board of Accelerator Technology Holdings headquartered in Amman, Jordan. John also served as co-chair of Dr. Robert Gallo's Advisory Board at the Institute of Human Virology.

== Honors and awards ==
In 2009 Evans received the Courage in Business award from the National Gay & Lesbian Chamber of Commerce. In 2018 University of Maryland School of Medicine awarded him a lifetime-achievement award for public service.

In 2019, he was honored with 2019 Distinguished Alumnus Award from University Liggett School.

== Personal life ==
Evans is the son of Edward S. Evans, Jr, former CEO of Evans Products Company, nephew of Robert Beverley Evans, and grandson of Edward S. Evans Sr, who, in 1926, flew around the world in 28 days setting the world's record with pilot Linton Wells. John Evans is a graduate of the University of Michigan, and has homes in Sag Harbor, New York and Ft. Lauderdale, Florida.
