= 18 in '08 =

Youth voter organisation

18 in ’08 is a non-profit, nonpartisan peer to peer youth voter engagement and mobilization organization. It was co-founded in 2007 by David D. Burstein, who is the current executive director, and his parents. 18 in ‘08 is the first national youth voter organization to be run by someone under 21.

== Purpose ==
18 in '08 promotes civic engagement among young people, specifically the 18- to 24-year-old age group. The organization emphasizes not just registration, but actual involvement in the political process.

== Current activities ==
For the 2008 presidential election, 18 in ’08 is planning a 50 college tour and political dialogues with candidates and elected officials on the state and federal level focused exclusively on youth issues. On June 30, 2008 18 in ’08 announced the debut of its celebrity PSA series, releasing the first two pieces on MySpace featuring Olivia Wilde and Peter Sarsgaard. The cast of the documentary film "American Teen" will be among future PSA stars.

== The Film ==
The organization began as a documentary film also called 18 in ’08. The film features leading politicians and public figures including: Senator Barbara Boxer, Senator Sam Brownback, Governor Jeb Bush, Senator Robert Byrd, Democratic Strategist James Carville, General Wesley Clark, Senator Chris Dodd, Former ABC News Anchor Sam Donaldson, Academy Award Winning Actor Richard Dreyfuss, Presidential Advisor David Gergen, Senator Chuck Hagel, Senator John Kerry, Congressman John Lewis, Senator Joe Lieberman, Filmmaker Alexandra Pelosi, Human Rights Leader Samantha Power, Congressman Adam Putnam, Former Kennedy Advisor Ted Sorensen, Former MTV News Correspondent Gideon Yago, Historian Howard Zinn, as well as students from across the country.

== Accomplishments ==
18 in '08 has screened its documentary film over 400 times since June 2007, and has also registered over 21,000 voters.

== Affiliated organizations ==
18 in ’08 has partnerships with organizations including The National Constitution Center, Mobilize.org, Declare Yourself, Why Tuesday?, Generation Engage, SAVE, and Project Vote Smart.

== Media coverage ==
18 in ’08 has been featured on the ABC Evening News, C-SPAN, CNN, NPR, Fox News, and in The New York Times, The Boston Globe, The Philadelphia Inquirer, The Village Voice, The Huffington Post, and The Politico.
