= Bringing Down the Colonel =

Political history book

Bringing Down the Colonel: A Sex Scandal of the Gilded Age, and the "Powerless" Woman Who Took On Washington
- Author: Patricia Miller
- Language: English
- Genre: Biography
- Publisher: Farrar, Straus and Giroux
- Publication date: 2018
- Publication place: United States
- Pages: 368
- ISBN: 978-0-3742-5266-3

Bringing Down the Colonel: A Sex Scandal of the Gilded Age, and the "Powerless" Woman Who Took On Washington is a 2018 book by Patricia Miller, a journalist for Religion Dispatches. The book describes the late-19th-century political sex scandal between Kentucky politician William Breckinridge and Madeline Pollard, a student. It details the affair and subsequent legal battle over Breckinridge's breach of contract, and discusses the resulting change in public opinion towards women and sex.
