= Derek Leebaert =

American technology executive, author

- Writing career
- Genre: non-fiction

Derek Leebaert is a partner at effectivRAI and an author of books on history and politics. He won the biennial 2020 Truman Book Award for Grand Improvisation.

Leebaert published Unlikely Heroes: Franklin Roosevelt, His Four Lieutenants, and the World They Made which was a Wall Street Journal "Best Book of 2023" and "recommended reading" from McKinsey. Presidential historian Richard Norton Smith praises it as "having done the near impossible--craft[ing] a fresh and challenging portrait of the man and his inner circle. . . .A book to regard in the same breath as the classics of Sherwood, Schlesinger, and Burns." The Guardian reviewed it as "masterful."

== Writings ==
To Dare and to Conquer was a Washington Post Book World "Nonfiction Best Book" of 2006,. His book, Magic and Mayhem: The Delusions of American Foreign Policy from Korea to Afghanistan, in 2010 warns that much of US foreign policy is based on ignorance of that country's history and culture. His previous book, Grand Improvisation (2018) was a New York Times "Best Book," and reviews are found in the Wall Street Journal, the New York Review of Books, the Times (London), et al. Leebaert also co-authored the MIT Press trilogy on the IT revolution, including The Future of the Electronic Marketplace and The Future of Software. .

== Life ==
In 1977 Leebaert was a research fellow at Harvard University and managing editor of International Security journal. He taught in the government and business school departments at Georgetown University.

== Books ==
Author

- The Fifty-Year Wound: How America’s Cold War Victory Shapes Our World Boston : Little, Brown, 2002. ISBN 9780316518475, OCLC 47023559
- To Dare and to Conquer: Special Operations and the Destiny of Nations from Achilles to Al Qaeda New York : Little, Brown, 2006. ISBN 9780316143844, OCLC 859079737
- Magic and Mayhem: the Delusions of American foreign policy from Korea to Afghanistan, New York : Simon & Schuster, 2010. ISBN 9781439141670, OCLC 764542809
- Grand Improvisation: America Confronts the British Superpower, 1945–1957, Farrar, Straus & Giroux, 2018. ISBN 9780374250720, OCLC 1019972309
- Unlikely Heroes: Franklin Roosevelt, His Four Lieutenants, and the World They Made, St. Martin's Press, 2023. ISBN 9781250274694 OCLC 1310772643

Editor

- European Security : prospects for the 1980s, Lexington, Mass. : Lexington Books, 1981. ISBN 9780669025187, OCLC 615033433
- Soviet Military Thinking, London; Boston : Allen & Unwin, 1981.
- The Future of the Electronic Marketplace, MIT Press, 1998.
- The Future of Software, MIT Press, 1995
- Technology 2001: The Future of Computing and Communications, MIT Press, 1991

== Selected articles ==
- Postwar Delusions: Why America Keeps Making Mistakes Abroad by Derek Leebaert
