= Hitlerland =

2012 book by Andrew Nagorski

Hitlerland: American Eyewitnesses to the Nazi Rise to Power
- Cover of the first edition
- Author: Andrew Nagorski
- Language: English
- Publisher: Simon & Schuster
- Publication date: 2012
- Publication place: United States
- Media type: Print (Hardcover and Paperback)
- Pages: 400
- ISBN: 143919100X

Hitlerland: American Eyewitnesses to the Nazi Rise to Power is a 2012 book by the journalist Andrew Nagorski.

The book covers the years before and during Hitler's ascent to power in Germany—roughly 1922 through 1941, focusing on widely varying impressions of Hitler by Americans who managed to observe him close up. Few outsiders took the man himself seriously even whilst acknowledging the steadily growing power and popularity of the National Socialist Party.

Figures who appear include:

- William Dodd, U.S. Ambassador to Germany.
- Martha Dodd, daughter of the Ambassador, had numerous affairs with renowned figures in Berlin, became a Soviet agent.
- W.E.B. Du Bois
- Ernst Hanfstaengl, German/American close friend of Adolf Hitler. Sometimes known as "Hitler's Piano Player"
- Richard Helms Later head of the CIA
- Ben Hecht
- Adolf Hitler
- Philip Johnson Future influential American architect, and admirer of the Nazis.
- H. V. Kaltenborn, famed American radio announcer, doubted Nazi brutality until he and his son were beaten for not giving the Nazi salute in 1933.
- George F. Kennan Later famous as the architect of containment
- Hubert Renfro Knickerbocker, journalist
- Sinclair Lewis
- Charles Lindbergh An admirer of the Nazis, though he spied on them to report to Roosevelt on their air power.
- Edgar Ansel Mowrer, Chicago Daily News Berlin bureau chief, one of the first to report Nazi atrocities, lived in daily peril due to his reports of Nazi atrocities. Eventually forced to flee Germany due to threats on his life.
- George S. Messersmith, U.S. Consul in Berlin who very early signaled to American officials the dangers of Nazism and Hitler.
- Jesse Owens Winner of four gold medals at the 1936 Olympics
- Franz von Papen, Vice Chancellor under Hindenburg.
- Sigrid Schultz, popular hostess in Berlin
- William Shirer, foreign correspondent for the International News Service and later for CBS.
- Howard K. Smith
- Truman Smith The first American official to meet Hitler.
- Dorothy Thompson
- Karl Henry von Wiegand First American reporter to interview Hitler, in 1922, his views became enormously influential in American views of Hitler
- Thomas Wolfe
- Sherwood Eddy The Protestant missionary who in the first year of Hitler's reign, visited Germany and spoke against Nazi atrocities.
