= Map Room (White House) =

Room in the White House

Coordinates: 38.897591°N 77.036733°W

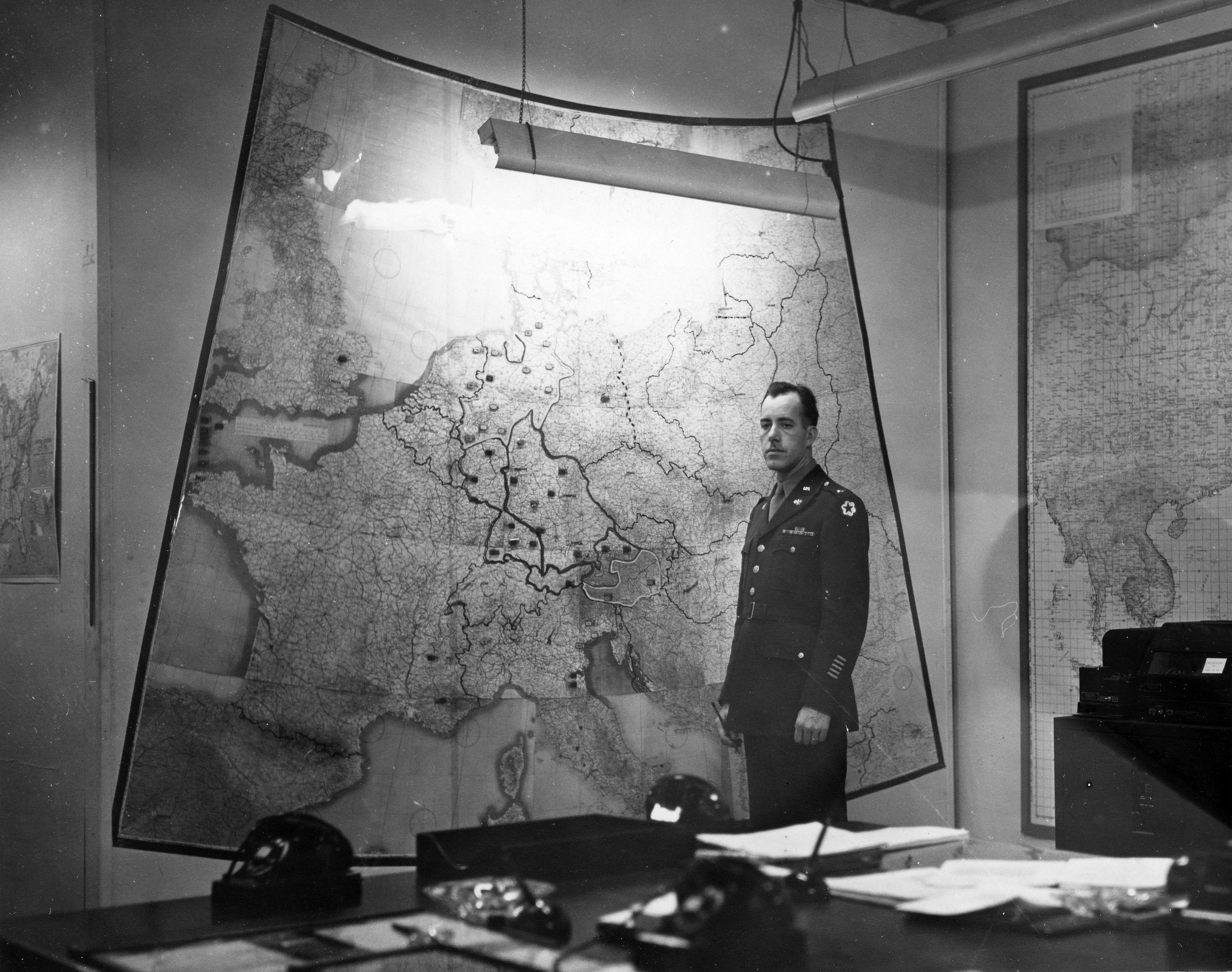
Map Room, circa 1943

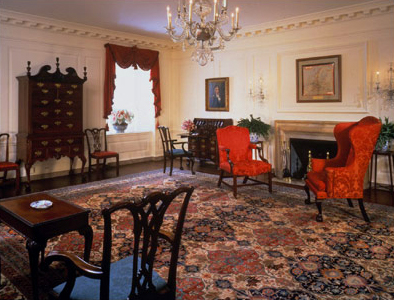
The Map Room looking southwest during the administration of Bill Clinton

White House ground floor showing location of the Map Room

The Map Room is a room on the ground floor of the White House, the official home of the president of the United States.

The Map Room takes its name from its use during World War II, when Franklin Roosevelt used it as a situation room where maps were consulted to track the war's progress (for such purposes, it was later replaced by the West Wing Situation Room). The room was originally finished as part of the extensive renovation of the White House designed by the architectural firm of McKim, Mead, and White in the administration of Theodore Roosevelt; the former basement billiard room was made into a formal space. In the Truman reconstruction of the White House (1949–1952), the room was paneled in the late Georgian style with wood sawn from the 1816 load-bearing timbers of the house. During the Kennedy administration, the room was used by the newly created Curator of the White House as an office, used to catalog donations of furniture and objects. Under the leadership of First Lady Pat Nixon, working with Curator Clement Conger, the room underwent a major redecoration in 1970, transforming it from an office to the parlor which remains today. The room was redecorated again in 1994.

The Map Room is furnished in the style of English cabinetmaker Thomas Chippendale and includes two stuffed-back armchairs that may have been built by Philadelphia cabinetmaker Thomas Affleck. Today the room is used for television interviews, small teas, and social gatherings.

== Events ==
- Henry Kissinger and Soviet Ambassador Anatoly Dobrynin frequently met in the Map Room to deal with nuclear crises during the Cold War.
- On August 17, 1998, Bill Clinton gave testimony to Independent Counsel Ken Starr and his deputies, regarding his role in the Clinton–Lewinsky scandal. This was taped via closed-circuit television and later aired on national television. Clinton was the first sitting President to testify under oath when he was the subject of the investigation.
- On January 21, 2009, the day after the inauguration of Barack Obama, Chief Justice John Roberts re-administered the constitutional oath of office to Obama in the Map Room. This was done out of an abundance of caution on the advice of the White House Counsel's Office after Obama and Roberts had misstated parts of the constitutionally-prescribed oath the previous day.
- On February 18, 2010, Barack Obama met with the 14th Dalai Lama in the Map Room. This differs from how the Obama administration generally met foreign dignitaries and VIPs, as they usually met in the Oval Office.
- On November 3, 2020, Donald Trump's most senior reelection campaign aides used the Map Room as the campaign's Election Night command center.

== See also ==
- Situation Room
