= The Washington Center =

Independent nonprofit organization for many universities in US

The Washington Center for Internships and Academic Seminars
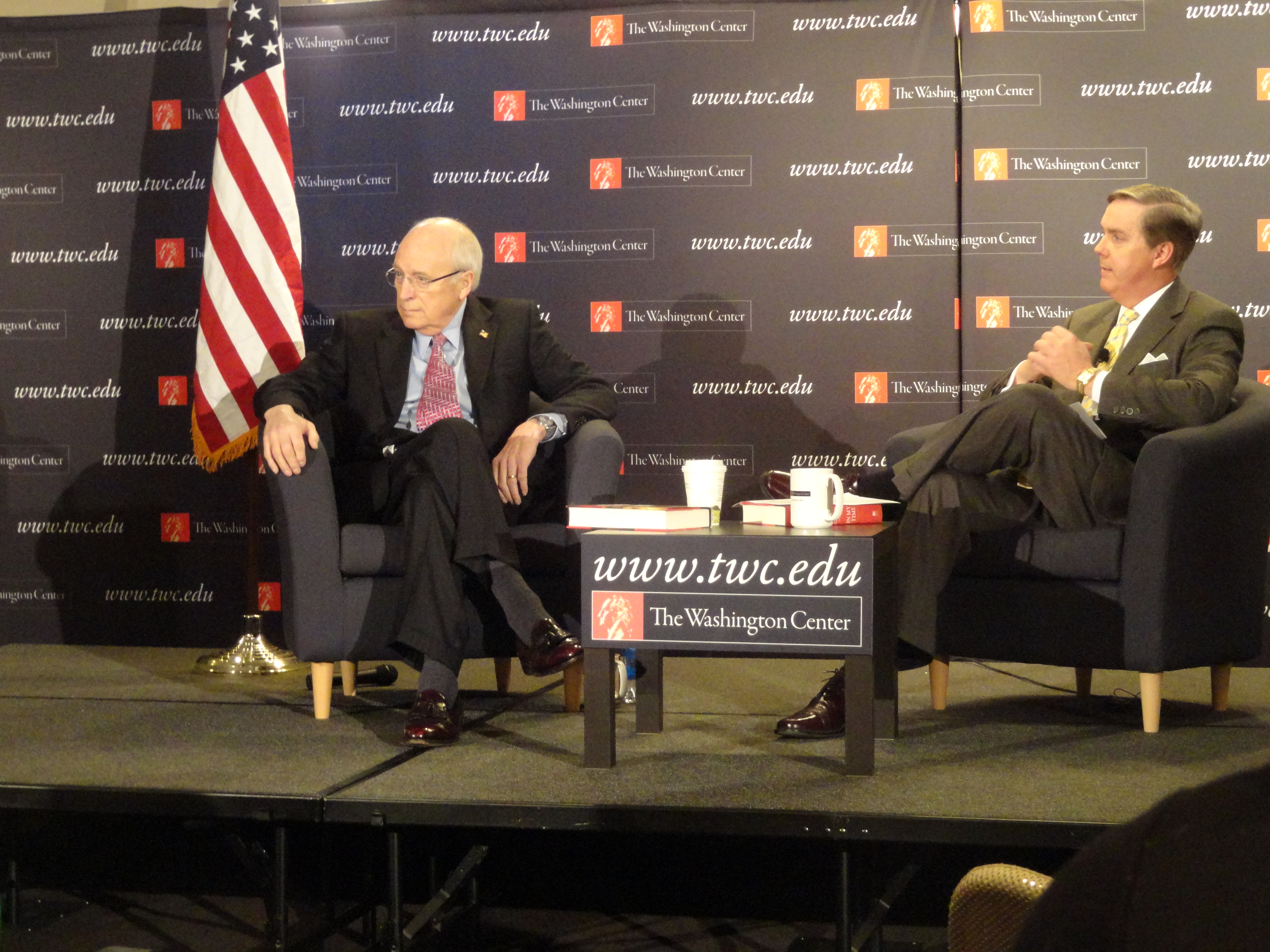
- Dick Cheney and Steve Scully speaking at the Washington Center in 2012
- Formation: 1975; 51 years ago
- Founder: William M. Burke
- Headquarters: 1005 3rd St NE, Washington, DC 20002
- President: Kimberly Churches
- Website: https://twc.edu
- Formerly called: The Washington Center for Learning Alternatives

The Washington Center for Internships and Academic Seminars, less formally known as The Washington Center, is an independent, nonprofit organization serving hundreds of universities in the United States and other countries. The Washington Center provides select college students opportunities to work and learn in Washington D.C. for academic credit. The Washington Center has over 50,000 alumni. Its headquarters is located within the Sixteenth Street Historic District.

== History ==
The Washington Center for Learning Alternatives was founded in Dupont Circle in 1975 by William M. Burke and Sheila Ann McRevey. The organization began to host international students from Sweden in the 1980s, and Mexico and Japan in the 2010s as it gained grants.

After the COVID-19 quarantine in the United States, President Kimberly Churches announced efforts to offer only paid internships for students by 2025, citing high costs of living in Washington D.C. that prevent students from lower socioeconomic backgrounds from participating. In 2024, in addition to paid internships, the Washington Center began offering "career-readiness programs" to teach students career skills such as how to set-up LinkedIn profiles, incorporated remote and hybrid work, and expanded the age groups allowed for internships to 18 to 46.
