= Susan Swain =

American business executive and journalist (born 1954)

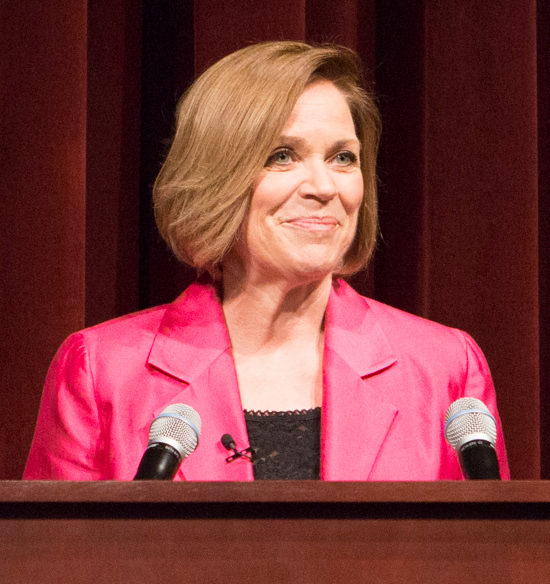
- Swain in 2015
- Born: December 23, 1954 (age 71); Philadelphia, Pennsylvania, U.S.
- Education: University of Scranton (B.A.)
- Occupations: Business executive, journalist
- Employer: C-SPAN
- Known for: Broadcasting executive at C-SPAN
- Notable work: First Ladies: Presidential Historians on the Lives of 45 Iconic American Women
- Television: First Ladies: Influence & Image
- Title: Co-CEO
- Predecessor: Brian Lamb
- Successor: Sam Feist

Susan M. Swain (b. 1954) is an American business executive and journalist who was the co-chief executive officer of C-SPAN with Robert Kennedy from April 2012 to September 2024.

== Early years and education ==
Swain was born December 23, 1954, in Philadelphia, Pennsylvania.

Swain was part of the first class of women at the University of Scranton when it became coeducational in 1972. She received a Bachelor of Arts in communications in 1976, magna cum laude. She served as a university trustee for six years, and in 1999, the school awarded her an honorary doctorate.

== Career ==
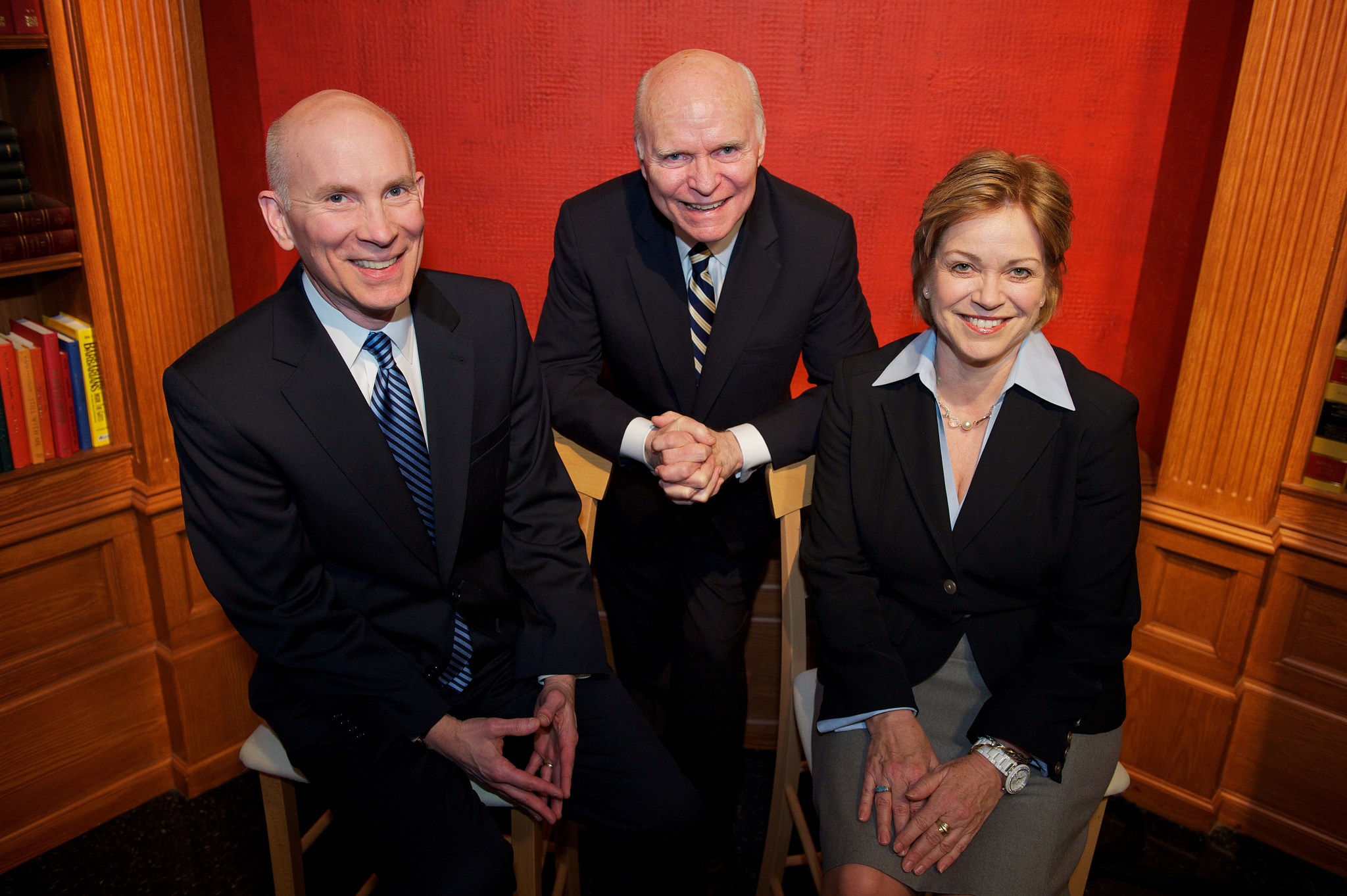
Susan Swain with (from left) Rob Kennedy, co-CEO of C-SPAN, and network founder Brian Lamb in 2012

Swain began working for C-SPAN in 1982 as an associate news producer. She was named co-president and chief operating officer in 2006 and co-chief executive officer in 2012 with Robert Kennedy. Kennedy oversaw finances and technology; Swain oversaw broadcast programming and marketing.

Swain helped create American History TV and First Ladies: Influence & Image. She made more than 5,300 appearances on C-SPAN during her time with the organization. In 2024, Swain and Kennedy were succeeded as C-SPAN CEO by Sam Feist, head of CNN's Washington D.C. news bureau.

Swain was inducted into the Broadcasting & Cable Hall of Fame in 2017 and the Cable Hall of Fame in 2019. She is a former member of the board of directors for Talbots and Discovery Communications, and is an emerita board member of the National Press Foundation.

== Bibliography ==
- Lamb, Brian; Swain, Susan (2008). Abraham Lincoln: Great American Historians on Our Sixteenth President. New York: PublicAffairs. ISBN 978-1586486761.
- Lamb, Brian; Swain, Susan; Farkas, Mark, eds. (2011). The Supreme Court: A C-SPAN book Featuring the Justices in Their Own Words. New York: PublicAffairs. ISBN 978-1586488352.
- Swain, Susan (2015). First Ladies: Presidential Historians on the Lives of 45 Iconic American Women. New York: PublicAffairs. ISBN 1610395662.
- Lamb, Brian; Brinkley, Douglas; Medford, Edna Greene; Smith, Richard Norton; Swain, Susan (2019). The Presidents: Noted Historians Rank America's Best—and Worst—Chief Executives. New York: PublicAffairs. ISBN 978-1541774339.
