= Andrew Ferguson (journalist) =

American journalist and author

- Born: June 28, 1956 (age 70)
- Occupation: Journalist

Andrew Ferguson (born June 28, 1956) is an American journalist and author.

== Career ==
Ferguson started as a staff writer at The Atlantic in 2018.

Previously, he was senior editor of The Weekly Standard (defunct since December 2018), and a columnist for Bloomberg News based in Washington, D.C. After the close of The Weekly Standard, David Brooks called Ferguson "the greatest political writer of my generation."

Before joining the Standard at its founding in 1995, he was senior editor at Washingtonian magazine. He has been a columnist for Fortune, TV Guide, and Forbes FYI, and a contributing editor to Time. He has also written for The New Yorker, New York, The New Republic, the Los Angeles Times, The Washington Post, and other publications.

In 1992, he was a White House speechwriter for President George H. W. Bush.

A collection of his essays, Fools' Names, Fools' Faces, was published by Atlantic Monthly Press in 1996, and Land of Lincoln was published released by Grove/Atlantic in 2007. His work has appeared in several anthologies.

== Bibliography ==
- Fools' Names, Fools' Faces. New York: Atlantic Monthly Press. 1996. ISBN 0-87113-651-1.
- Land of Lincoln: Adventures in Abe's America. Atlantic Monthly Press. 2007. ISBN 978-0-87113-967-2.
- Crazy U: One Dad's Crash Course on Getting His Kid into College. New York: Simon & Schuster. 2011. ISBN 978-1-4391-0121-6.
