= Q&A (American talk show) =

- Genre: Talk show
- Presented by: Susan Swain
- Country of origin: United States

Original release
- Network: C-SPAN
- Release: December 12, 2004 – present

Related
- Booknotes

Q&A is an American television series on the C-SPAN network. Each Q&A episode is a one-hour formal face-to-face interview with a notable person, originally hosted by C-SPAN founder Brian Lamb and currently hosted by co-CEO Susan Swain. Typical guests on the show include journalists, politicians, authors, doctors and other public figures. C-SPAN’s criteria for guests is that they have a personal story and can teach the viewer something.

Q&A airs on Sunday nights at 8 p.m. and 11 p.m. Eastern Time, and the C-SPAN website features videos and transcripts of all past interviews.

== Production ==
Q&A premiered on Sunday, December 12, 2004. It replaced the program Booknotes, which Brian Lamb had hosted for 15 years previously. Whereas Booknotes featured interviews only with published authors, the concept for Q&A as developed by Lamb was to interview noteworthy individuals from diverse backgrounds and learn about their achievements.

The program's interviews are normally recorded in the studio space previously used for Booknotes, however other locations have been used. The first episode of Q&A was taped in the Knowledge Is Power Program Academy’s music hall, and an interview with President George W. Bush was recorded in the White House Map Room.

== Guests ==
The first four guests to appear on Q&A were co-founder of the Knowledge Is Power Program Dave Levin, Fox News president Roger Ailes, NBC Nightly News anchor Brian Williams and Rensselaer Polytechnic Institute president Shirley Ann Jackson. Guests since then have included former Arkansas Governor Mike Huckabee, former CIA Director Michael V. Hayden, President Bush in a shorter, 23-minute interview, and Orlando Magic director of player development and founder of Democracy Matters, Adonal Foyle. The American Historical Association has identified interviews with historians David M. Kennedy, Michael Korda, Andrew Ferguson and David McCullough, as well as Wikipedia co-founder Jimmy Wales as "particularly interesting".

== See also ==
- Notable shows running on C-SPAN
