= Brian Lamb =

American journalist, C-SPAN founder

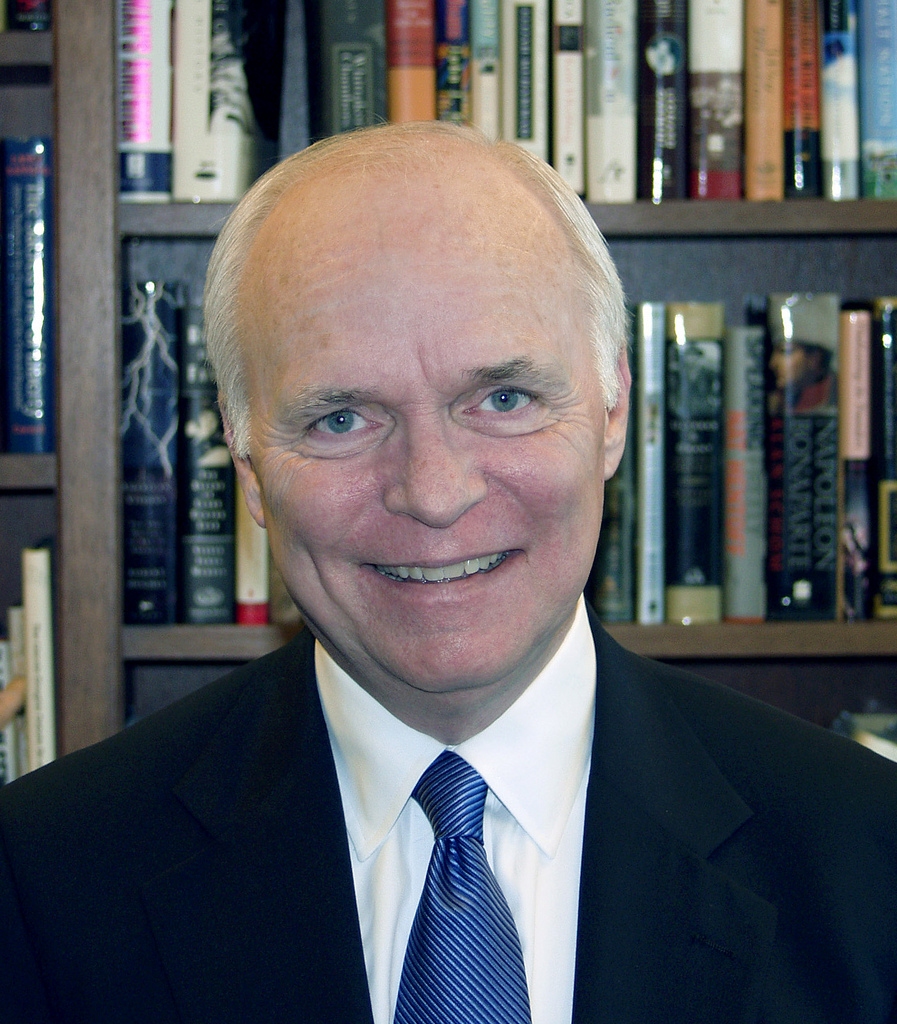
- Lamb in 2012
- Born: Brian Patrick Lamb; October 9, 1941 (age 85); Lafayette, Indiana, U.S.
- Education: Purdue University (BA)
- Known for: Founding C-SPAN
- Spouse: Victoria Martin (m. 2005)
- Awards: Presidential Medal of Freedom (2007); National Humanities Medal (2008)
- Military career
- Branch: United States Navy
- Rank: Lieutenant
- Unit: USS Thuban
- Conflicts: Vietnam War

Brian Patrick Lamb (/læm/; born October 9, 1941) is an American journalist. He is the founder, executive chairman, and the now-retired CEO of C-SPAN, an American cable network that provides coverage of the U.S. House of Representatives and U.S. Senate as well as other public affairs events. In 2007, Lamb was awarded Presidential Medal of Freedom by President George W. Bush and received the National Humanities Medal the following year.

Prior to launching C-SPAN in 1979, Lamb held various communication roles including that of a telecommunications policy staffer for the White House and as the Washington bureau chief for Cablevision magazine. He also served as a commissioned officer in the United States Navy for four years. Lamb has conducted thousands of interviews, including those on C-SPAN's Booknotes and Q&A, where he was known for his unique interview style that focused on short, direct questions.

== Early life and education ==
On October 9, 1941, Lamb was born in Lafayette, Indiana, and lived there until he was 22 years old. Growing up, he wanted to be an entertainer and spent time as a disc jockey and as a drummer in many local bands. Lamb showed an early interest in television and radio, starting his first radio job at WASK (AM)—a local station in Lafayette—at the age of 17. His job at the radio station gave him the opportunity to interview musicians including Louis Armstrong, Duke Ellington, Nat King Cole, Count Basie, and The Kingston Trio while he was still in high school.

After graduating from Jefferson High School, Lamb attended Purdue University. There, he was a member of Phi Gamma Delta and graduated in 1963 with a Bachelor of Arts in speech. During his junior year at the college in 1961, he coordinated a television program titled Dance Date that was similar to Dick Clark's ABC series, American Bandstand.

=== Military service ===
Following his graduation, Lamb was accepted into the Navy's Officer Candidate School. Upon completion of his training, he served 18 months on the attack cargo ship USS Thuban, and then moved to the Pentagon where he served in the audio/visual office of the Assistant Secretary of Defense for Public Affairs. Lamb took up this role midway through the Vietnam War and, in addition to handling queries from radio and television networks, he attended press briefings with Defense Secretary Robert McNamara.

In July 1967, following riots in Detroit, Lamb was sent there tasked with providing recordings of news conferences of Governor George W. Romney of Michigan for the White House Situation Room. He also served as a White House social aide to Lyndon B. Johnson, escorting Lady Bird Johnson down the aisle at the wedding of Chuck Robb and Lynda Johnson. He later recalled, "For five years after I got out of the Navy and went back part of the time to Indiana, the only thing I was known to have ever done in my life was to escort Mrs. Johnson down the aisle." Lamb spent a total of four years in the U.S. Navy and was a junior grade Lieutenant at the time he left. He later said that his time in the U.S. Navy was "probably the most important thing I’ve ever done".

== Early career ==
In December 1967, following his Navy service, Lamb's interest in politics led him to interview for the role of personal aide to Richard Nixon during his campaign for the 1968 presidential election, but, instead, he chose to return to Indiana. In August 1968, after working at a local television station in Lafayette, he spent ten weeks working for a group called "United Citizens for Nixon–Agnew". Following the campaign, he worked as a reporter for UPI Audio and, in 1969, became press secretary for Senator Peter H. Dominick. Afterwards, Lamb became an assistant for media and congressional relations to Clay T. Whitehead, then the director of the White House Office of Telecommunications Policy.

After the White House, Lamb returned to journalism as the editor of a biweekly newsletter entitled, The Media Report. While editing The Media Report, he also became the Washington bureau chief of trade magazine Cablevision for four years, covering telecommunications issues. During this time, he developed his idea of creating a public affairs-oriented cable network.

== C-SPAN ==
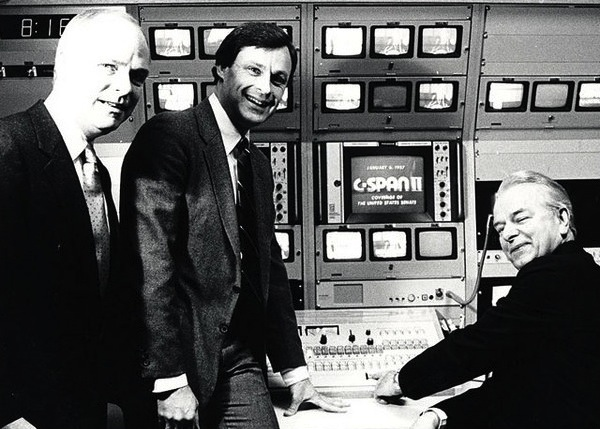
Senator Robert Byrd (right) flipping the switch for C-SPAN2 with Lamb and then-president of C-SPAN Paul FitzPatrick in 1986

In 1977, Lamb submitted a proposal to cable television executives for a nonprofit channel that would broadcast official proceedings of Congress. He later said, "The risks weren't very significant. No one knew who I was. If I failed, so what?" The idea was approved in December 1977 and the Cable Satellite Public Affairs Network was created as a private nonprofit business with a board of cable-operating company executives, funded by affiliate fees from cable companies. At its launch the network had a staff of four employees, including Lamb, and an annual budget of $450,000. The first broadcast occurred on March 19, 1979, with live coverage of the first televised House of Representatives floor debate.

By 2010, C-SPAN reached over 100 million households, and the network employed 275 individuals in Washington D.C. and at its archives in West Lafayette. Its coverage includes a variety of public affairs programming, including presidential press conferences and Senate hearings, in addition to its gavel-to-gavel coverage of the House and Senate. As of 2011, C-SPAN consists of three networks: C-SPAN, C-SPAN2 and C-SPAN3 plus a radio station, with more than 170,000 hours of C-SPAN footage available online via the C-SPAN Video Library. Lamb is the former CEO and president of C-SPAN, and now serves as executive chairman of its board of directors. He has described the network as "in every single way, the antithesis of commercial television".

In March 2012, Lamb announced his plan to step down as CEO, handing control over to Rob Kennedy and Susan Swain.

=== Hosting and interview style ===
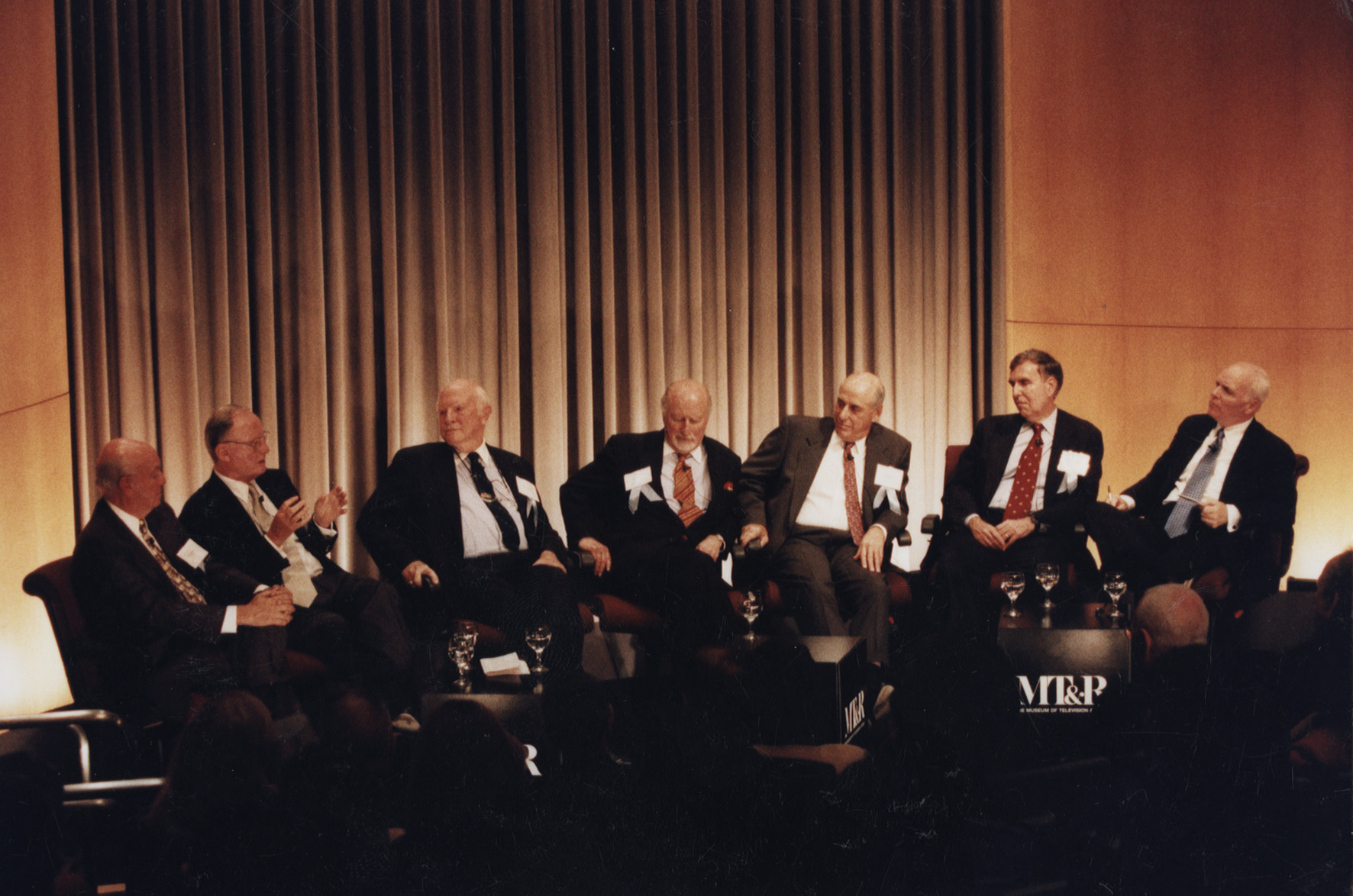
Lamb (last on right) in a panel discussing the first use of a satellite for cable television

On C-SPAN, Lamb hosted Washington Journal, Booknotes, and continues to host Q&A, and through these programs has become known for his distinctive interview style. According to him, he learned the basics of broadcasting and interviewing from his high school broadcasting teacher, Bill Fraser, who taught him to "stay out of the way" while he conducted interviews.

Lamb does not discuss his own political views.

According to The Advocate, his style of interviewing is "Spartan", and he has stated: "Too many interviewers intrude too much.… They try to make us think they're smarter than the person they're interviewing. Well, I assume I'm not smarter and if I am smarter I don't want the audience to find out."

=== Booknotes ===
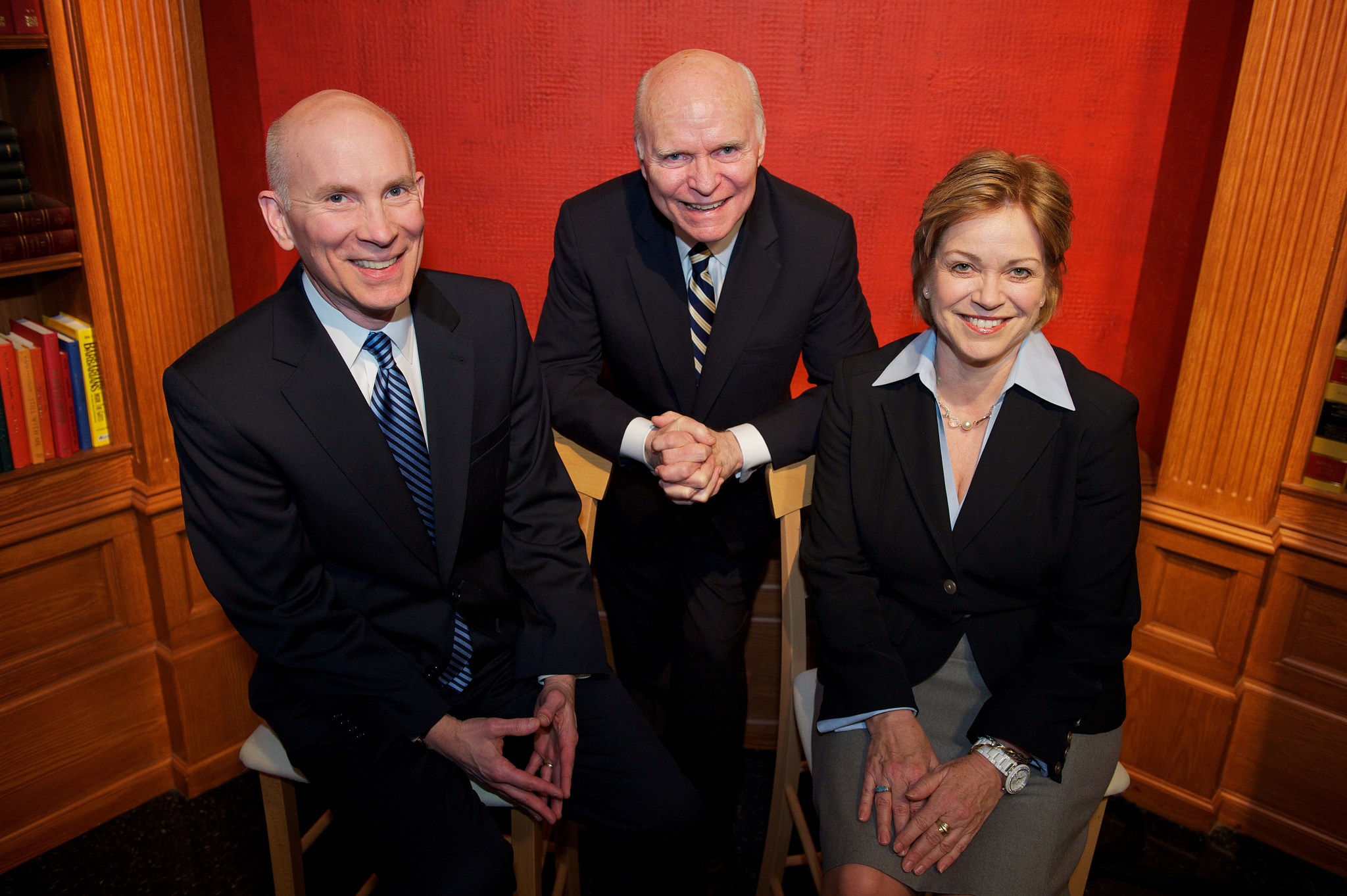
Lamb (middle) with co-CEOs Susan Swain and Rob Kennedy

In his 35 years at C-SPAN, Lamb has conducted thousands of interviews, including 801 editions of Booknotes, a weekly program he hosted focusing on nonfiction books.

His first Booknotes interview was broadcast on April 2, 1989, and the final program aired on December 4, 2004. Over the course of the program, Lamb's interviewees included authors, politicians, and world leaders including George H. W. Bush, George W. Bush, Jimmy Carter, Bill Clinton, Mikhail Gorbachev, Richard Nixon, Colin Powell, Christopher Hitchens and Margaret Thatcher.

The program's format was described in its tagline, "One author, one book, one hour", and Lamb has stated that he spent an average of 20 hours reading and preparing for each interview, though by some counts he spoke for less than five minutes over the course of each program.

Lamb published five books based on Booknotes interviews, each a collection of essays written from transcripts of his interviews with authors. The books focus on writing, biographies of figures from American history, American history stories, "American character" and the life of Abraham Lincoln, respectively.

After Booknotes ended, Lamb began hosting a new program titled Q&A, featuring interviews with figures from politics, technology, education, and media, as well as authors. He also continued to host Washington Journal, C-SPAN's morning call-in program, until 2008.

In 2011, Lamb donated his collection of books from the Booknotes series, many containing his personal marginalia, to the rare books collection of George Mason University to create an academic archive.

=== Issues ===
As CEO of C-SPAN, Lamb was involved in issues related to ensuring public access to the proceedings of the federal government and also to increasing media access to legislative and judicial proceedings. Lamb opposed the "must-carry" provisions of the Cable Television Protection and Competition Act of 1992, which he later stated, had led to 10 million Americans losing or experiencing reduced access to C-SPAN. In 1998, he wrote to the House Committee on Energy and Commerce and Senate Committee on Commerce, Science, and Transportation, arguing against digital must-carry legislation. During the impeachment of President Clinton, Lamb wrote to then-Senate Majority Leader Trent Lott, urging the Senate to "keep this process open to the public" and formally requesting permission for televised coverage of the Senate's deliberations. In addition, he has written to House Speakers of both parties in 1994, 2006 and 2010, requesting that independent media cameras be added to the House floor to allow a more complete view of debates. Lamb has also written to chief justices Rehnquist and Roberts requesting the televising of oral arguments before the Supreme Court of the United States and other federal courts.

== Personal life ==
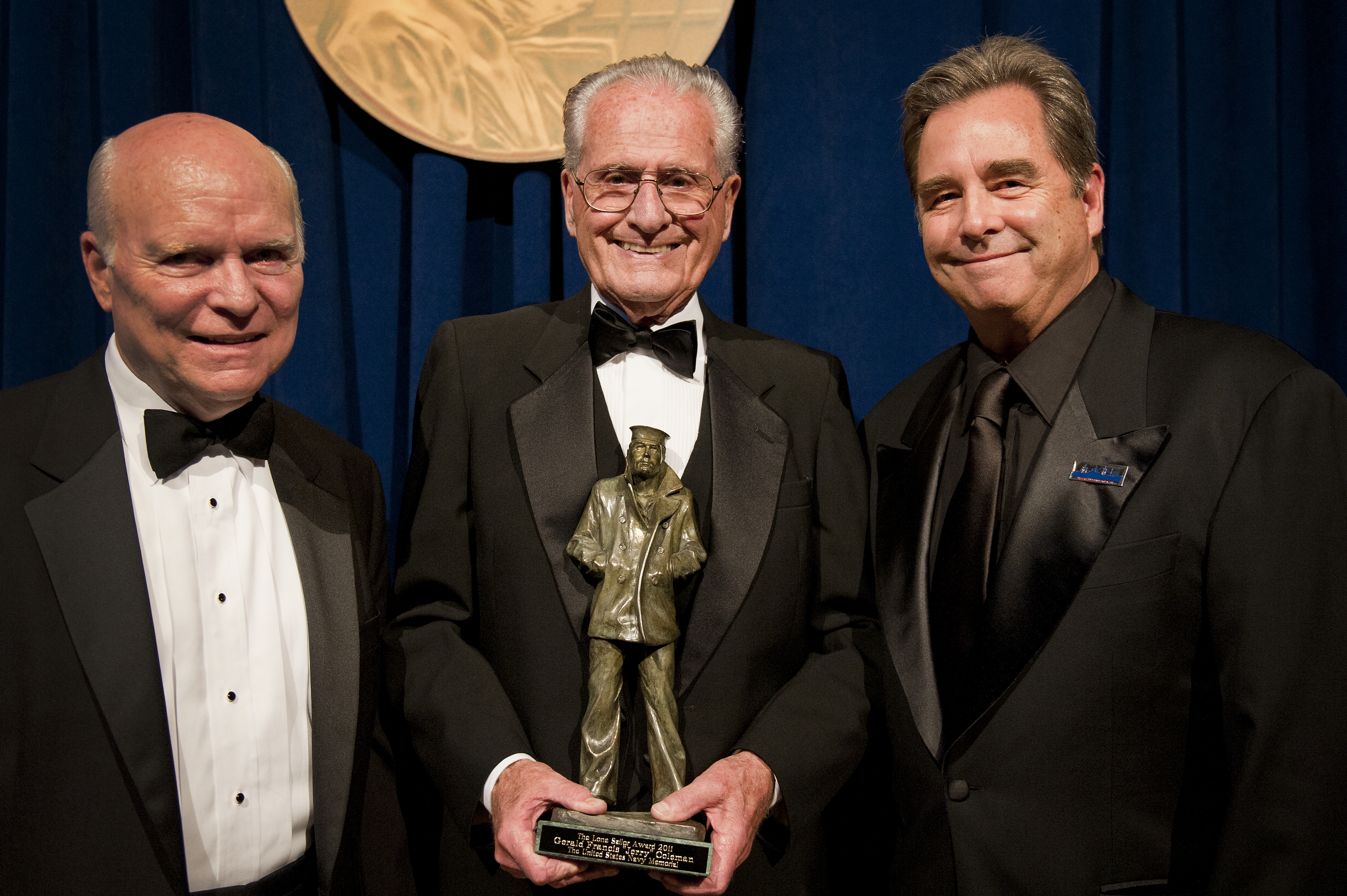
Lamb (left), Jerry Coleman, and Beau Bridges receiving the Lone Sailor Award in 2011

Lamb has spent most of his life in Washington, D.C., and currently lives with his wife, Victoria, in Arlington, Virginia. He married Victoria Martin in September 2005. The couple met in grade school at St. Mary's Cathedral and had dated in Washington, D.C., in the 1970s, later restarting their relationship in 1998.

Lamb has never been a member of a political party, though he did work for the Republican Nixon–Agnew campaign in 1968. He is not registered as a Democrat or Republican. He has voted for candidates across the political spectrum during presidential elections. In an interview Lamb stated he has "been listening to both sides so long that I don't know what I think anymore."

The late writer Christopher Hitchens dedicated his 2005 biography of Thomas Jefferson to Lamb; on the title page appear the words, "For Brian Lamb ... a fine democrat as well as a good republican, who has striven for an educated electorate".

== Awards and recognition ==
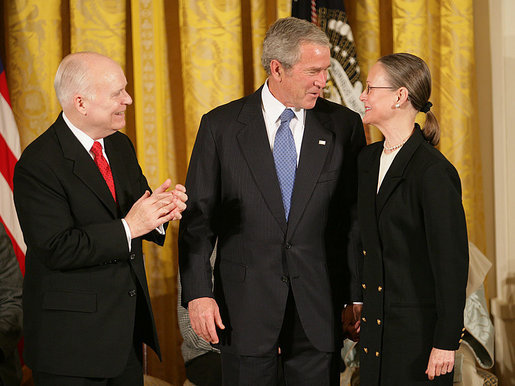
George W. Bush congratulates Lamb (left) and his wife during the presentation of the Presidential Medal of Freedom.

Lamb has received numerous honors and awards for his work at C-SPAN. He was inducted into the 2000 Cable Hall of Fame at the Syndeo Institute at the Cable Center. Lamb was the recipient of the National Press Club's Fourth Estate Award in 2002. The following year, he was awarded the National Humanities Medal, the Harry S. Truman Good Neighbor Award, and The Media Institute's Freedom of Speech Award.

In November 2007, Lamb received the Presidential Medal of Freedom—the highest civilian award in the United States—from then President George W. Bush for his work at C-SPAN; the White House announcement stated that Lamb had received the award for his "dedication to a transparent political system and to the free flow of ideas". In September 2011, Lamb received The Lone Sailor award from the U.S. Navy Memorial, recognizing individuals who begin their careers in the Navy, and to have gone on to have had "exceptional civilian careers".

In addition, he has received a number of communications-related awards, including the Manship Prize for Exemplary Use of Media and Technology from Louisiana State University's Manship School of Mass Communication, and the Al Neuharth Award for Excellence in the Media. In 2011, he was awarded the Gaylord Prize for Excellence in Journalism sponsored by the Gaylord College of Journalism and Mass Communication at the University of Oklahoma, and was named as one of Library of American Broadcasting's 2011 "Giants of Broadcasting".

Lamb has received multiple honorary doctorates, including one from his alma mater, Purdue University. Purdue also awarded him its Distinguished Alumni Award in 1987, with the university later renaming its communications department as the Brian Lamb School of Communication in 2011. In 2015, Lamb was awarded an honorary doctorate from Gettysburg College. In 1997, Lamb received The Lincoln Forum's Richard Nelson Current Award of Achievement.

== Bibliography ==
In addition to his five books based on Booknotes interviews, Lamb has written a book with Richard Norton Smith about the gravesites of American presidents, Who's Buried in Grant's Tomb? A Tour of Presidential Gravesites, and a companion book to a series of C-SPAN interviews with Supreme Court justices, The Supreme Court: A C-SPAN Book, Featuring the Justices in their Own Words.

A complete list of his published works:

- C-SPAN: America's Town Hall (1988) Washington, DC: Acropolis Books. ISBN 0-87491-889-8.
- Booknotes: America's Finest Authors on Reading, Writing, and the Power of Ideas (1997) New York: Random House. ISBN 978-0-8129-3029-0.
- Booknotes Life Stories: Notable Biographers on the People Who Shaped America (1999) New York: Times Books. ISBN 978-0-8129-3339-0.
- Who's Buried in Grant's Tomb? A Tour of Presidential Gravesites (1999) with Richard Norton Smith and Douglas Brinkley. Washington, DC: National Cable Satellite Corp. ISBN 978-1-8818-4607-9. OCLC 229172738.
  - Republished (2003) New York: PublicAffairs.
- Booknotes: Stories from American History (2001) New York: PublicAffairs. ISBN 978-0-1420-0249-0.
- Booknotes: On American Character (2004) New York: PublicAffairs. ISBN 978-1-5864-8342-5.
- Abraham Lincoln: Great American Historians on Our Sixteenth President (2008) Brian Lamb and Susan Swain, PublicAffairs, New York City. ISBN 978-1-58648-676-1.
- The Supreme Court: A C-SPAN Book, Featuring the Justices in their Own Words (2010) Brian Lamb and Susan Swain, PublicAffairs. ISBN 1-58648-835-X

== See also ==
- Steve Scully
- John D. Evans
