= Meacham =

Meacham is a surname. Notable people with the surname include:

- Alfred B. Meacham (1826–1882), American Methodist minister, reformer, author and historian, Superintendent of Indian Affairs for Oregon
- Anne Meacham (1925—2006), American actress
- Bobby Meacham (born 1960), American former Major League Baseball player and coach
- Doug Meacham (born 1964), American college football coach
- Ellis K. Meacham (1913–1998), American attorney, judge and novelist
- F. W. Meacham (1856–1909), American music composer and arranger
- George F. Meacham (1831–1917), American architect
- Gwendoline Meacham (1892–1981), birth name of Wendy Wood, English campaigner for Scottish independence, artist, sculptor and writer
- James Meacham (1810–1856), American politician, minister and professor
- Jeff Meacham (born 1979), American actor
- John A. Meacham (1944–2022), American psychologist
- Jon Meacham (born 1969), American writer, reviewer, historian, presidential biographer and Canon Historian of the Washington National Cathedral
- Joseph Meacham (1742–1796), early leader of the Shakers
- Mildred Meacham (1924–2017), American All-American Girls Professional Baseball League infielder
- Richard Meacham (fl. from 2000), New Zealand sailor who has competed in multiple America's Cups
- Rusty Meacham (born 1968), American former Major League Baseball pitcher
- Scott Meacham (born 1963), 17th state treasurer of Oklahoma
- Shirley Meacham (1927–2010), American politician
- Standish Meacham (1932–2024), American historian
- Trenton Meacham (born 1985), American college basketball analyst and former professional basketball player
- Walter William Meacham (1844–1905), Canadian politician and physician
- William Meacham (fl. from 1970), American archaeologist

== See also ==
- Robert Meachem, American football player
- Meachum, a list of people and fictional characters with the surname
- Mecham, a list of people with the surname
- Mechem, a list of people with the surname
