= American Lion: Andrew Jackson in the White House =

2008 book by Jon Meacham

- Author: Jon Meacham
- Language: English
- Genre: Presidential Biography
- Publisher: Random House
- Publication date: November 11, 2008
- Publication place: United States
- Media type: Print (hardcover, paperback)
- Pages: 512 pages
- ISBN: 1-4000-6325-6
- Dewey Decimal: 973.56092

American Lion: Andrew Jackson in the White House is a 2008 biography of Andrew Jackson, the seventh President of the United States, written by Jon Meacham. It won the 2009 Pulitzer Prize for Biography, with the prize jury describing it as "an unflinching portrait of a not always admirable democrat but a pivotal president, written with an agile prose that brings the Jackson saga to life".

Meacham wrote American Lion drawing in part on previously unavailable documents, including letters, diaries, memorabilia, and accounts from Jackson's intimate circle that had been largely privately owned for 175 years. Much of the correspondence was found in archives at the Hermitage, Jackson's estate in Nashville, Tennessee. American Lion is not a full-scale account of Jackson's entire life or political career, but rather focuses on his presidency and his domestic arrangements in the White House.

American Lion focuses a great deal on the Bank War, the federal tariff on imports, and the Petticoat affair, during which Meacham claimed "the future of the American presidency was at stake". Meacham believed Jackson represented the best and worst of American character, citing his simultaneous capacity for kindness and cruelty. Of all the early U.S. presidents and Founding Fathers, Meacham believed Jackson was "the most like us", and had the strongest influence on the modern presidency. In writing American Lion, Meacham said he sought not to whitewash Jackson or "all his sins, which are enormous", such as his support of slavery and Indian removal.

American Lion received generally positive reviews. It was included on The New York Times Book Review's list of 100 Notable Books of 2008, and was ranked one of the best books of 2008 by The Washington Post's Book World. Critics praised Meacham's writing, the depth of research, Jackson's riveting story, and the placement of Jackson's legacy in a modern context. Mixed or negative reviews accused Meacham of portraying Jackson too positively or spending too much time on political scandals. The book has reportedly been read by U.S. presidents George W. Bush and Donald Trump, and praised by such figures as Vice President Mike Pence, Mark Zuckerberg, Bill O'Reilly, Jon Stewart, Eric Cantor, and Tim McGraw.

In 2015, HBO announced it was working on a television miniseries adaptation of American Lion starring Sean Penn as Andrew Jackson, but the project stalled after the departure of director Phillip Noyce over reported disagreements with Jackson's depiction.

== Synopsis ==
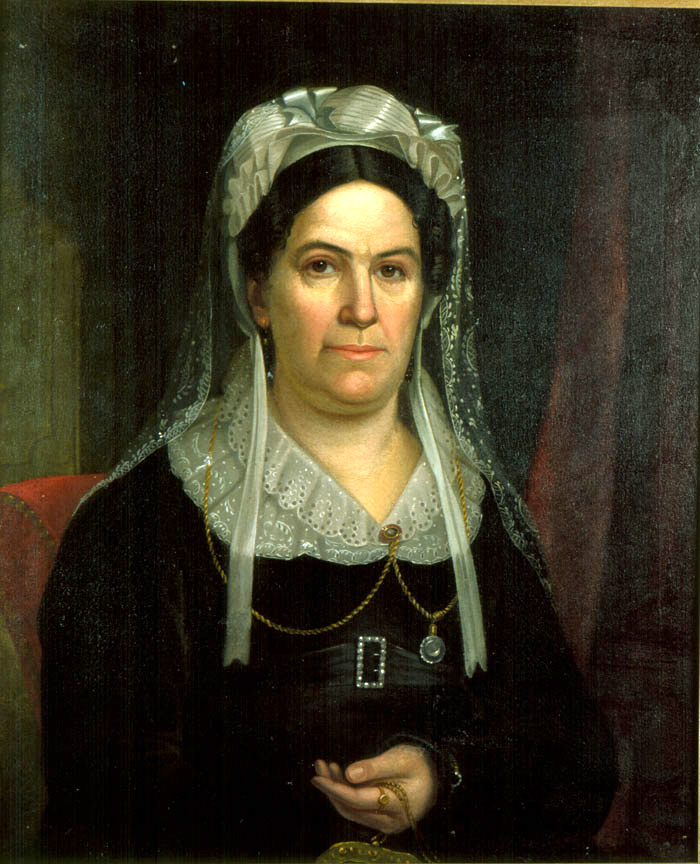
Early chapters of American Lion touch upon the viciousness of 1828 presidential election and death of Rachel Jackson (pictured) immediately afterward.

American Lion opens just after Andrew Jackson's victory in the 1828 United States presidential election. Author Jon Meacham writes about the viciousness of the election and the death of Rachel Jackson immediately afterward, which Jackson blames on his attacks by his political enemies during the campaign. The book then touches upon Jackson's early life, including his birth in the Waxhaws region of the Carolinas and his family life. It briefly covers his marriage to Rachel, legal career, move to Nashville, Tennessee, and his military career, particularly his role in the Battle of New Orleans and the part it played in elevating his reputation. The book then segues into the beginning of his political career, his rivalries with Henry Clay and John C. Calhoun, and his loss in the 1824 presidential election despite winning the popular vote, which Jackson regarded as a "corrupt bargain" by his political enemies.

Returning to Jackson's presidency, Meacham defines patronage, the Bank War, the nullification crisis, Indian removal, clerical influence in politics, internal improvements, and respect abroad as the questions that would define Jackson's White House years. Meacham wrote that, to many in established Washington, Jackson's arrival "signaled the destruction of the rule of the nation in an atmosphere of geniality and gentility". By contrast, Meacham wrote that Jackson felt the country was "suffering from a crisis of corruption (in) the marshaling of power and influence by a few institutions and interests that sought to profit at the expense of the whole". According to the book, Jackson felt the President should "use his powers with a firm hand", whereas his foes thought of Congress as the government's center of gravity. Meacham wrote that Jackson's most enduring conviction was that, as President, he was acting selflessly in the interest of the nation and of its mass of citizens, and that his own will was the same as the will of the country. Meacham wrote: "No institution, he argued, should stand between the people and the presidency. ... No president had spoken in such a way before."

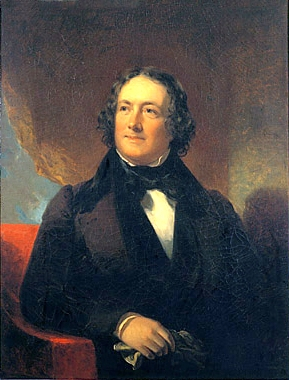
Andrew Jackson's conflict with the Second Bank of the United States and its president Nicholas Biddle (pictured) is one of the focal points of American Lion.

Meacham focuses a great deal on Jackson's determination to end the Second Bank of the United States, which was presided over by Nicholas Biddle, and which Jackson believed had been manipulated by Clay to assist with John Quincy Adams's election to the presidency in 1824. Jackson regarded the bank as a fundamentally corrupt institution and "the embodiment of unfair privilege". The book highlights Biddle's challenge to Jackson in pressing for recharter and his attempt to use the influence of the Bank to harm his reelection. It covers Jackson's veto of the charter, attempts by Biddle and Clay to see the veto overridden, and ultimately the decision by the United States House of Representatives in 1834 not to override the veto, ensuring the Bank would not be rechartered.

The book also discusses Jackson's role in the removal of Native Americans to lands west of the Mississippi River. Meacham wrote: "Jackson believed in removal with all his heart, and by refusing to entertain any other scenario, he was as ferocious in inflicting harm on a people as he often was in defending the rights of those he thought of as the people." As the book recounts, Jackson was not compelled by treaties signed and assurances previously provided to Native Americans; he did not believe that they had title to the land, and he would not tolerate what he felt were competing sovereignties within the nation. It details Jackson's support for the successful passage of the Indian Removal Act, which would ultimately lead to the Trail of Tears.

American Lion also highlights Jackson's feelings on what he called the "absurd and wicked doctrines of nullification and secession", and his confrontation with the state of South Carolina regarding the issue of nullification after the state declared the Tariffs of 1828 and 1832 unconstitutional and therefore void within the state's boundaries. Meacham described the nullification crisis as "perhaps the most delicate mission of his life – how to preserve the Union without appearing so tyrannical and power-hungry that other Southern states might join with South Carolina, precipitating an even graver crisis that could lead to the secession of several states." The book covers Jackson's support of the Force Bill, which authorized the President to use military forces against South Carolina if necessary, as well as the Compromise Tariff of 1833, which ultimately ended the crisis.

Finally, the book focuses on Emily Donelson's role as White House hostess and de facto First Lady of the United States. Meacham wrote: "Family life was crucial to Jackson, who had known so little of it growing up, and Emily ensured that the White House was a sanctuary for him." The book also discusses the Petticoat affair, during which Jackson's Secretary of War John Eaton was socially ostracized due to his wife Peggy Eaton's perceived moral failings and lack of sexual virtue. The scandal generated considerable chaos and controversy during Jackson's administration, during which Jackson felt, according to Meacham, that "to acknowledge the Eatons was to side with Jackson; to snub the Eatons was to oppose Jackson". Meacham wrote that Jackson's interpretation of the Petticoat affair was that he was "acting for the common democratic good", while aristocratic elites were acting against him out of jealousy of his power in Washington. The book highlights how Martin Van Buren endeared himself to Jackson by siding with him during the scandal, and how the Petticoat affair led to resignations from Jackson's cabinet that sparked "a national debate over Jackson's first three years of leadership and whether he should have another term".

Following the conclusion of Jackson's two terms, American Lion ends with a brief synopsis of his post-presidential life, including Emily Donelson's death, and Jackson's own death in 1845.

== Writing and sources ==
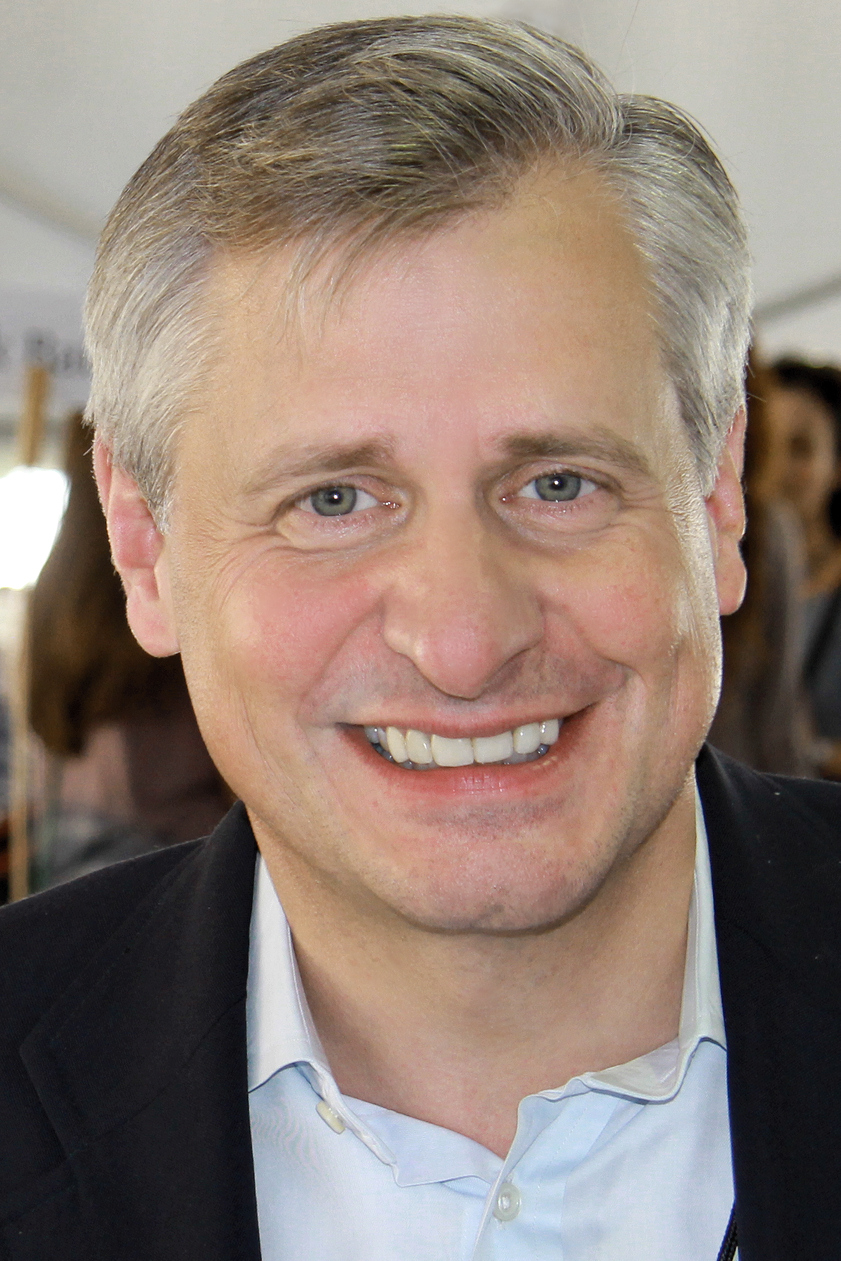
American Lion was written by Jon Meacham, then the editor of Newsweek magazine.

Jon Meacham was the editor of Newsweek magazine at the time that American Lion was released. It was the third book he wrote, following Franklin and Winston: An Intimate Portrait of an Epic Friendship (2003) and American Gospel: God, the Founding Fathers, and the Making of a Nation (2006). Jonathan Karp, an editor at Random House, was the first to suggest Andrew Jackson as a subject to Meacham. The book took about five years to write, with Meacham drawing in part on previously unavailable documents, including letters from Jackson's intimate circle that had been largely privately owned for 175 years. Meacham said he was "surprised, delightfully so" by the number of new sources that emerged in the course of his research, which he said "provide hitherto unknown details about a lost world that foreshadowed and shaped our own".

Most of the previously unpublished correspondence was found in archives at the Hermitage, Jackson's estate in Nashville, Tennessee. Among them were unpublished letters in the Benjamin and Gertrude Caldwell Collection, which were housed at the Hermitage. Meacham was also given access to a private collection of letters kept by Mrs. John Lawrence Merritt, as well as John Donelson's collection at Nashville's Cleveland Hall. This Cleveland Hall collection included unpublished diaries, and about 60 to 70 previously unreleased letters, including several from Andrew Donelson and Andrew Jackson Jr. Meacham described the Cleveland Hall, Merritt, and Caldwell letters in particular as "critical" to his book.

The Merritt letters included new details about Emily Donelson's role in the life of the White House, as well as the fact that John Henry Eaton considered resigning from Jackson's administration in the spring of 1829. Meacham said this was particularly notable because, had he resigned, it might have preserved John C. Calhoun's viability as a presidential successor to Jackson and changed the course of Jackson's first term. The Merritt and Caldwell letters also shed new light on the central role Emily and Andrew Donelson played in the early lives of Andrew and Rachel Jackson, and included allusions to such important issues during Jackson's presidency as the tariff, nullification, the Bank War, and the efforts by those seeking to succeed Jackson in 1836.

The Donelson letters offered details about the harshness of partisan politics of the 1830s, life in the White House and the Jackson circle in the South, and the extent of slave trading in Jackson's family during the White House years. They also "examine how Jackson's deliberations on the crucial issues of the day played out against this background of weddings, births, and White House frolics". While writing the book Meacham developed a relationship with the Donelson family, which helped gain an immediacy in writing about events of the early 1800s. Meacham said: "My lens was, 'What was it like to walk through those hallways?' This is the first time we've known what it was like to live in the White House in Andrew Jackson's time."

Meacham was also given access to the private collection of letters and memorabilia held by Scott Ward, a descendant of Andrew Jackson Jr. living in Atlanta. Among those letters was the reply of Thomas Marshall to the last letter of Jackson's life. Other sources for American Lion included unpublished letters and diary entries from the papers of John Quincy Adams and his wife Louisa, as well as letters from British, Dutch, and French diplomatic archives, which provided observations on the political and social scenes of Washington, D.C. Among these was a note from Richard Wellesley, 1st Marquess Wellesley discussing the risk of the union's collapse during the crisis of nullification. Meacham also accessed letters from Treasury Secretary Samuel Ingham detailing a near gunfight with John Henry Eaton. Maria Campbell shared with Meacham The Memoirs of Mrs. Eliza Williams Chotard Gould, a private and unpublished account by Campbell's great-great-great-grandmother which included eyewitness accounts of Jackson in New Orleans just before and after his military victory over the British.

Meacham received guidance from several historians during the course of writing American Lion, including Arthur M. Schlesinger Jr., the author of The Age of Jackson; Sean Wilentz; and Daniel Feller, editor of The Papers of Andrew Jackson and author of The Public Lands in Jacksonian Politics and The Jacksonian Promise: America, 1815–1840. Meacham also acknowledged the influence Jackson scholars James Parton and Robert V. Remini had over his work on American Lion. First Lady of the United States Laura Bush and Jean Becker, chief of staff to former president George H. W. Bush, allowed Meacham to tour the private quarters of the White House as part of his research, and Meacham also visited the United States Capitol. Meacham said his personal opinion of Jackson had improved by the end of the writing process, saying: "There are two ways to write a biography. One is to be utterly hostile. The other is to be empathetic. I chose to be empathetic."

== Themes ==
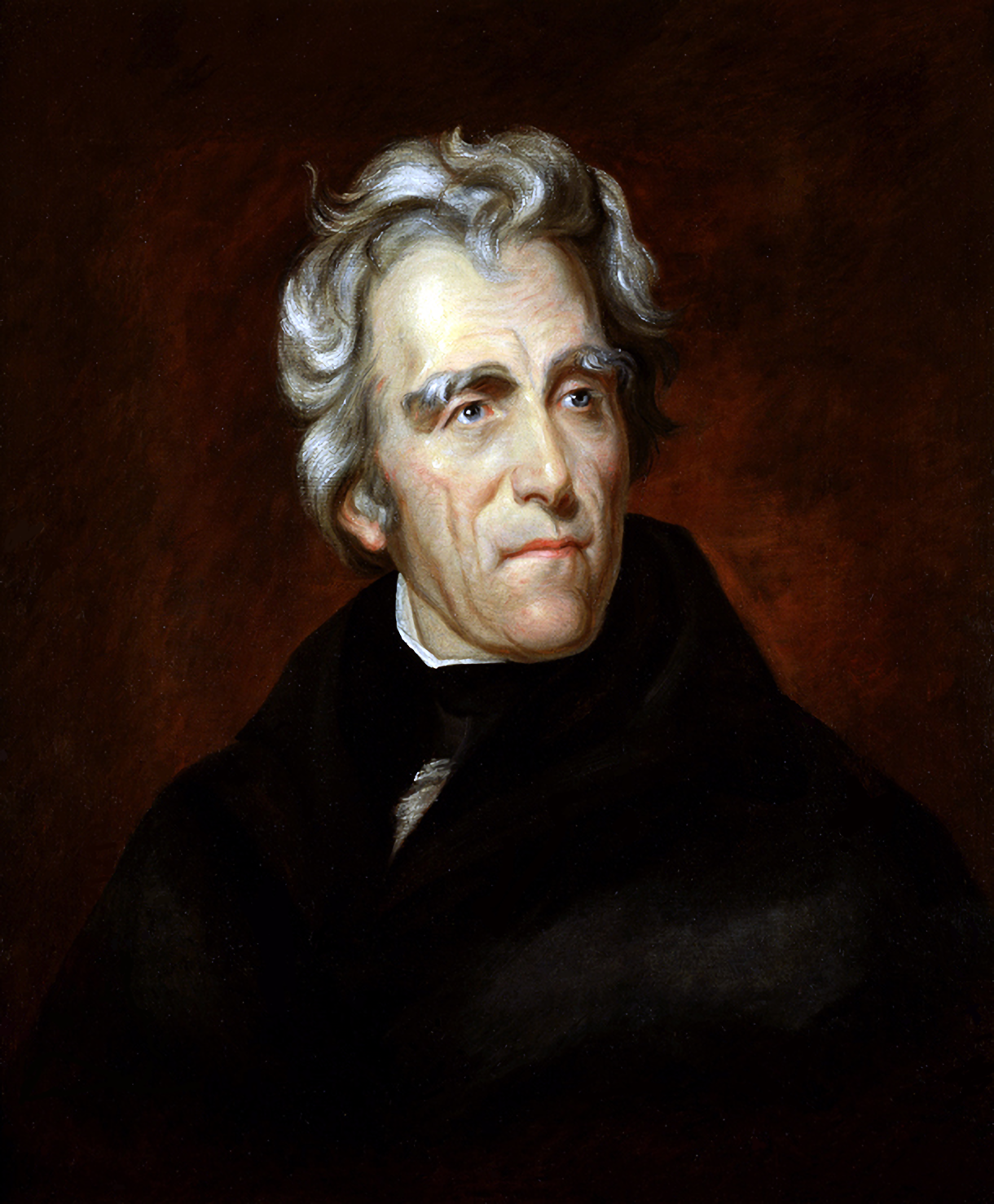
In American Lion, Jon Meacham described Andrew Jackson as representative of both the best and worst of American character.

Meacham said he named the book American Lion because he felt lions make both the best allies and the worst enemies, which he felt captured the contradictions at Jackson's core: "If he were on your side, he would do all he could to protect you. If he believed you a foe, then he was a ferocious and merciless predator." Meacham believed Jackson represented the best and worst of American character, citing his simultaneous capacity for kindness and cruelty. Meacham believed of all the early U.S. presidents and Founding Fathers, Jackson was "the most like us", and the duality of Jackson's nature is one shared by America itself. To that end, Meacham believed an understanding of Jackson leads to an understanding of the capacity Americans have for cognitive dissonance, particularly in tolerating inequality and injustice while convincing themselves that they are in fact striving for those virtues.

American Lion is not a full-scale account of Jackson's entire life or political career, but rather focuses on his presidency and his domestic arrangements in the White House. Meacham said he did not seek to write an academic study of Jackson's presidency because he believed that territory had already been covered by multiple biographies and historical accounts, and instead he "attempted to paint a biographical portrait of Jackson and of many of the people who lived and worked with him in his tumultuous years in power". Through his forceful character and aggressive actions in the office, Meacham believes Jackson influenced the modern presidency more than any other chief executive that came before him. In particular, Meacham believed Jackson helped shaped such aspects of modern American politics as popular campaigning techniques, media manipulation, and engaging citizens in the narrative of politics while simultaneously governing. Meacham wrote: "All of these features flowered in the age of Jackson, and they all feel very contemporary." Ann Robinson of The Oregonian wrote that the book illustrates how Jackson changed the U.S. presidency in ways that continue to resonate in modern times, particularly in his expansive claims for the executive branch's inherent constitutional powers, such as the veto.

Author Robert Roper noted that American Lion largely does not contest the mainstream interpretation of Jackson's story, though journalist and critic Janet Maslin said the book "dispenses with the usual view of Jackson as a Tennessee hothead and instead sees a cannily ambitious figure determined to reshape the power of the presidency during his time in office". According to Maslin, American Lion portrays Jackson as more calculating than he is often considered to be, and describes how Jackson's rivals like Henry Clay and John C. Calhoun often misunderstood his true agenda because they could not see past his confrontational style. Likewise, author and historian Douglas Brinkley noted that most historians tend to disregard Jackson's intellectual abilities, but that later chapters of American Lion in particular focus on this aspect of Jackson and "separate Jackson from his rough-and-tumble reputation and to present him in a more multi-dimensional way".

Meacham said he did not want American Lion to whitewash Jackson or "all his sins, which are enormous", such as his support of slavery and Indian removal. Meacham wrote: "In the saga of the Jackson presidency, one marked by both democratic triumphs and racist tragedies, we can see the American character in formation and in action." Meacham believed "the tragedy of Jackson's life is that a man dedicated to freedom failed to see liberty as a universal, not a particular, gift." Conversely, Meacham believed one of the triumphs of Jackson's life was that he held together a country which ultimately – albeit belatedly – extended its protections and promises to all. Meacham felt that progress would not have been possible if Jackson had not thwarted the divisive forces of his day, writing: "By saving the Union, Jackson kept the possibility of progress alive." Author and The Seattle Times book reviewer Steve Weinberg argued American Lion presents Jackson through the great man theory, which believes the character of the ruler determines events more than events wash over the ruler. However, Weinberg also noted that Meacham "wisely dilutes" the great man theory by emphasizing Jackson's chief advisers and family.

American Lion tells what Roper called the "human-interest saga of the Jackson circle", with a heavy focus on the people closest to him during his presidency, such as Andrew Jackson Donelson and Emily Donelson. Through his portrayal of Jackson's reaction to those with whom he disagreed during the Petticoat affair, Maslin said American Lion "convey(s) the stubbornness with which Jackson turned seemingly personal conflicts among the women in his life into matters of public concern". According to The New York Times writer Andrew Cayton, American Lion presents Jackson as a man to whom "personal loyalty was always the supreme law", and as someone who considers his personal enemies to be enemies of the nation itself. In the book, Meacham argued that because Jackson was orphaned, and never had any biological children himself, he spent much of his life forming substitute families that he would protect like a father: first with the soldiers who served under him, and then later with his surrogate son Andrew Jackson Donelson. American Lion also portrays Jackson as taking a very paternalistic approach to the presidency itself, noting Jackson's words that he looked at his citizens "with the feelings of a father". Maslin wrote: "In Mr. Meacham's view, Jackson's paternalism was sincere: no president may have felt more literally like the father of his country." Jackson's view of himself as a paternal role even extended to his treatment of Native Americans, with him viewing his removal policies as a sensible and proactive step to move them out of harm's way and protect them.

== Publication and sales ==
Prior to the publication of American Lion, Pulitzer Prize-winning author and historian Daniel Feller read the manuscript and fielded questions from Meacham about the work. Historians Walter Isaacson and Doris Kearns Goodwin also read the manuscript, and different sections of it were reviewed in advance of publication by such historians and scholars as Catherine Allgor, H. W. Brands, Andrew Burstein, Mark Cheathem, Donald B. Cole, William W. Freehling, Richard Latner, John F. Marszalek, and Matthew Warshauer. Meacham's book was published within five years of the release of several books about Andrew Jackson by such authors as Sean Wilentz, Daniel Walker Howe and Andrew Burstein. Robert Roper, an author who reviewed American Lion for the Los Angeles Times, said Meacham's book did not contest the portrayals of Jackson presented in those books, but rather it "selectively enriches that version with graceful new readings of some formerly overlooked primary materials". American Lion debuted at #2 on The New York Times bestsellers list, and remained on the list for more than six months. According to Publishers Weekly, American Lion sold 463,678 copies domestically in the calendar year 2018. Following the book's publication, Meacham was named to the board of directors of the Hermitage, and was also named a trustee of the Andrew Jackson Foundation. An audiobook version of American Lion, narrated by Richard McGonagle, was released by Random House Audio on November 11, 2008.

== Reception ==
In American Lion, Newsweek editor Jon Meacham gives us the most readable single-volume biography ever written of our seventh president, drawing on a trove of previously unpublished correspondence to vividly illuminate the self-made warrior who 'embodied the nation's birth and youth.'

— Douglas Brinkley

American Lion received generally positive reviews. It was included on The New York Times Book Review's list of 100 Notable Books of 2008, and was ranked one of the best books of 2008 by The Washington Post's Book World. The Post's blog The Fix also included it on its list of best presidential biographies. American Lion was featured on The New York Times' list of "17 Great Books About American Presidents", and on Amazon's list (compiled by various book editors) of "100 Biographies and Memoirs to Read in a Lifetime".

Author and historian Douglas Brinkley called it "the most readable single-volume biography ever written of our seventh president". The New York Times literary critic Janet Maslin called it a "carefully analytical biography (which) looks past the theatrics and posturing to the essential elements of Jackson's many showdowns". Andrew Cayton, also of The New York Times, called the book "enormously entertaining, especially in the deft descriptions of Jackson's personality and domestic life in his White House", but felt Meacham has missed an opportunity to reflect on the nature of American populism as personified by Jackson. Presidential biographer Doris Kearns Goodwin called American Lion "a beautifully written, absolutely riveting story", describing Meacham as "a master storyteller (who) interweaves the lives of Jackson and the members of his inner circle to create a highly original work". Historian Michael Beschloss called it "a spellbinding, brilliant and irresistible journey (that) shows us how the old hero transformed both the American presidency and the nation he led." Journalist and author Allen Barra called American Lion probably the "fullest and most balanced biography" of Andrew Jackson. In a review for Los Angeles Times, Robert Roper called it an engaging book that enriches the story of Andrew Jackson, and "comes most startlingly alive when he tells the old, amazing story of the ill-educated rube who invented modern politics". Deirdre Donahue of USA Today called it "marvelously readable", and said Meacham "displays his gift for illustrating how personal bonds and personal experience influence history". In a review for Rocky Mountain News, Dan Danbom called American Lion a readable account of an interesting and colorful historical figure, and while he felt Meacham could have provided more historical context in parts, he believes the parallels between Jackson's time and contemporary politics made it recommended reading.

The Washington Post reporter Justin Wm. Moyer identified American Lion as the definitive Jackson biography. Steve Weinberg of The Seattle Times said Meacham "deserves credit for modernizing Jackson so that a new generation of readers might discover him". Erik J. Chaput of The Providence Journal called American Lion an "engaging and oftentimes brilliant study" of Jackson, and felt it was at its best during its analysis and discussion of the Petticoat Affair. He added: "No book published on Jackson in recent memory is more illuminating about his life, his family, his political ideology, and his religious beliefs". The Journal writer Trevor Seigler said the book should go a long way toward correcting misconceptions about Jackson, writing: "You'll certainly never see the $20 bill the same way again." In a review for New York Journal of Books, author and poet J. W. Nicklaus called American Lion a skillfully rendered biography that reads like a novel rather than a dry historical account, and he complimented Meacham for collating such a vast volume of information into an accessible biography. Dean Poling of The Valdosta Daily Times called it an excellent biography "in prose that reads like a novel". In a review for The Manhattan Mercury, Ed Horne called American Lion impressive in scope and "of textbook quality, but still a lively read of a crucial era of American history". St. Louis Post-Dispatch book reviewer Myron A. Marty called American Lion an "elegantly written, thoroughly researched book", as well as "a paean to Jackson", writing that Meacham "makes no attempt to conceal his boundless admiration for the man and his accomplishments". He felt Meacham spent too much time on the scandals and political infighting from Jackson's administration, but felt this imbalance was "countered by Meacham's sensitive portrayal of Jackson's interactions with members of his family".

Other reviews were more mixed. Jill Lepore of The New Yorker called American Lion "engrossing" but felt it was too admiring of Jackson, arguing it did not assign Jackson enough blame for the Panic of 1837 that ensued nine weeks after his presidency. Ann Robinson of The Oregonian reviewed the book positively, but said Meacham examines the Petticoat Affair "in somewhat tedious detail", and felt Meacham's attempts to humanize Jackson "with tales of his visits to orphans or of his fondness for children and his enduring love for his wife" were of limited success. Joe Pompeo of The New York Observer felt the second half of the book was the more interesting because of the focus on the Eaton affair and because the issues Jackson tackled in his second term were themselves more interesting. However, he expressed surprise that the book so rarely turns to life outside Washington: "The people, for all their centrality to Jackson's administration, are also the most notable omission in Mr. Meacham's account." Adera Causey of Chattanooga Times Free Press called Meacham a "solid writer (who) seamlessly explicates complicated political issues", and presents Jackson's story in an approachable format. However, she said he spent too much time on the Eaton affair and could have devoted more attention to such issues as the handling of Native American land rights, slavery, and the unique roles of church and state. The Washington Post columnist Michael Gerson called the book "brilliant in everything except its reverence for its subject". Alex Beam, columnist for The Boston Globe, was very critical of American Lion, saying he attempted to portray Jackson too positively, and "trafficks in treacly legends", and calling the book "laughable" and "piffle". Beam wrote: "Meacham is a smooth writer and I can't fault him for seeking the shortest possible path to the bank, penning triumphalist, jingoistic hogwash". An AudioFile review of the American Lion audiobook complimented Richard McGonagle's vocal delivery, which it said improved upon the "sometimes chatty and unabashedly pro-Jackson history" presented in the narrative itself.

American Lion was read by U.S. president George W. Bush, according to his advisor Karl Rove. U.S. president Donald Trump, who maintains that he does not read many books, claimed to have read American Lion. Others who have voiced enjoyment of the book include U.S. vice president Mike Pence, Facebook co-founder Mark Zuckerberg, former House Majority Leader Eric Cantor, former Daily Show host Jon Stewart, and former White House Deputy Press Secretary Raj Shah. Political commentator Bill O'Reilly complimented the book, calling it a "fair assessment" of Jackson and saying it deserved the Pulitzer Prize. Nashville Mayor John Cooper has called it his favorite book, and country music singer Tim McGraw has called it one of his favorites. Tim Walch, a historian and former director of the Herbert Hoover Presidential Library and Museum in West Branch, Iowa, included American Lion in his 2015 list of books that all the U.S. presidential candidates should read, and it was the Buffalo News Book Club selection of February 2010. Actor Benjamin Walker read American Lion as part of his preparation to play Andrew Jackson in the rock musical Bloody Bloody Andrew Jackson; he called it a "great book". When Meacham first sought to write Destiny and Power (2015), a biography of President George H. W. Bush, Bush said he was intimidated because he felt he was a very different figure than Andrew Jackson as portrayed in the book, saying: "It is a little overwhelming to think that I would be following a lion."

== Awards and honors ==
American Lion received the Pulitzer Prize for Biography. When the Pulitzer Prize jury awarded the book in 2009, the judges described it as "an unflinching portrait of a not always admirable democrat but a pivotal president, written with an agile prose that brings the Jackson saga to life". American Lion was also nominated for a 2008 Los Angeles Times Book Prize for Best Biography, losing to Ida: A Sword Among Lions, the Paula Giddings biography of African American investigative journalist Ida B. Wells.

== Adaptations ==
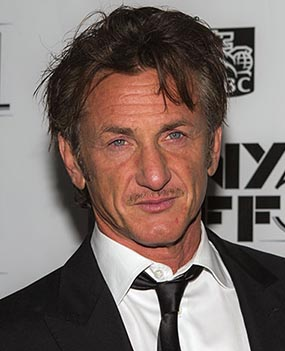
Actor Sean Penn had been expected to star in and co-produce a television adaptation of American Lion before the project stalled.

In December 2015, HBO announced it was working on a six-hour television miniseries based upon the book, also to be called American Lion, starring Sean Penn as Andrew Jackson. It would have been Penn's first major television role. The project was developed by Lionsgate Television, with the script written by Doug Miro and Carlo Bernard, who later co-created of the television series Narcos. Miro and Bernard were to serve as executive producers along with Penn and Matt Jacobson, Head of Market Development for Facebook, which would have been his first producing credit. Jacobson optioned the rights for American Lion after reading the book in 2012: "I saw a lot of analogies with what is happening now and felt the story needed to be told." The Jackson biography by historian Robert V. Remini was to provide additional source material. It was the first series order at HBO for Lionsgate Television.

Director Phillip Noyce became attached to the project, and it was scheduled to go into production the summer of 2016, with a planned release in 2017. But Noyce left the project in May 2016, reportedly over disagreements with how to depict some of the more controversial aspects of Jackson's presidency, though The Hollywood Reporter quoted a source who claimed Noyce was let go for not providing a production end date. The project stalled after that and few details have emerged since.
