= Meachum =

Meachum may refer to:

- John Berry Meachum (1789–1854), American pastor, businessman, educator and founder of the First African Baptist Church in St. Louis
- Harold Meachum, a Marvel Comics character
- Joy Meachum, a Marvel Comics character, daughter of the above
- Ward Meachum, a Marvel Comics character, brother of Harold Meachum

== See also ==
- Meachum v. Fano, a 1976 United States Supreme Court case
- Meacham (disambiguation)
- Mecham, a list of people with the surname
- Mechem, a list of people with the surname
