= Nurse Shirley =

Nurse Shirley may refer to:

- Shirley Chater (born July 30, 1932), American nurse, educational administrator and government official who served as the 12th commissioner of the Social Security Administration
- Shirley Congdon (born 1961), British nurse and academic administrator who is the eighth and current vice chancellor of the University of Bradford
- Shirley Dorismond, Canadian politician and former union leader and nurse
- Shirley Meacham (1927–2010), American nurse and politician
- Shirley Roberts, a fictional character in the sitcom Scrubs; see Laverne Roberts
- Shirley Smoyak, a nurse and academic who has had a significant impact on the field of psychiatric nursing
