= Christina Jeffrey =

American political scientist

Historian of the United States House of Representatives
- In office January 3-10, 1995
- Preceded by: Raymond W. Smock
- Succeeded by: Robert V. Remini (2005)

Personal details
- Education: Vassar College; University of Plano (BA); University of Alabama (MA, PhD)

Christina Jeffrey is an American political scientist who briefly served as Historian of the United States House of Representatives.

== Biography ==
Jeffrey attended Vassar College from 1965 to 1966 and graduated from the University of Plano with a Bachelor of Arts in 1969. She earned a Master of Arts in 1973 and a Doctor of Philosophy in 1984 from the University of Alabama. Her dissertation was titled "Explaining Adoption of Foreign-Trade Zones Among Sunbelt Cities". While at Alabama she worked in several positions, including as director of international student affairs from 1974 to 1978 and director of student affairs from 1978 to 1980. Jeffrey worked at Troy State University from 1984 to 1987 before finding employment as an associate professor of political science and public administration at Kennesaw State College.

Jeffrey also worked as a consultant to the United States Department of Education during the Presidency of Ronald Reagan. In 1986 she criticized a program called “The Holocaust and Human Behavior,” because “The program gives no evidence of balance or objectivity,” as “The Nazi point of view, however unpopular, is still a point of view and it is not presented; nor is that of the Ku Klux Klan.” She further noted that the program did not cover any other 20th century genocides. The program did not receive federal funding after her recommendation. After the incident, Congress examined her in 1988 and the Department of Education removed her as an approved consultant.

=== As Historian of the House ===
Newt Gingrich, the Speaker of the United States House of Representatives, fired the Historian of the United States House of Representatives, Raymond Smock, in late December 1994. That month he offered Jeffrey, who he had taught with at Kennesaw, the role. Her husband, Robert, wrote a book about Gingrich's career. She accepted it on December 15. The appointment was not announced until early January. Upon taking the position on January 3, she was described as an "outspoken political supporter" of Gingrich. On January 9 her comments as a Department of Education consultant were discovered and widely publicized. Shortly afterwards Gingrich requested that Jeffrey resign from the role, and she formally did the following day.

Gingrich and his staffers stated that he had not known about her comments, but an aide to Jeffrey told The New York Times that he had been advised of the incident before appointing her to the role. Politicians such as Chuck Schumer accused Jeffrey of "showing surprising insensitivity to antisemitism and bigotry." Jeffrey responded to the criticism, calling it "outrageous" and "slanderous". She told The Atlanta Journal-Constitution that attacks on her were actually aimed at Gingrich and that she considered it "a complete distortion", noting that the Department of Education had formally apologized for its treatment of her.

=== Later career ===
Jeffrey's actions were widely discussed. The Atlanta Journal-Constitution criticized her dismissal as stifling free speech. Others praised Gingrich for acting quickly to remove her. Julianne Malveaux, writing in Black Issues in Higher Education, asked what sides there were to present to the Ku Klux Klan or the Holocaust. In September, the Anti-Defamation League said that Jeffrey was "stigmatized unfairly" and "mislabeled anti-Semitic". On November 30, Gingrich apologized for firing her and John Lewis voiced support for efforts to clear her name. Other politicians continued to criticize her actions, including Barney Frank and Chuck Schumer. In early 1996 Jeffrey announced that she was considering filing a lawsuit against Gingrich, and in May she published an op-ed in The Wall Street Journal titled "Why I Am Suing Gingrich and Schumer", where she detailed a lawsuit against Gingrich and Schumer for "defamation and contract violations." The suit was dismissed. The House did not have a Historian for several years after Jeffrey resigned.

After leaving the position as Historian, she returned to teaching at Kennesaw State. In 2000, Jeffrey ran to represent Georgia's 6th congressional district in the House of Representatives, which had been vacated when Gingrich retired. She received 25% of the Republican vote in primaries. In 2010, Jeffrey ran in the Republican primary to represent South Carolina's 4th congressional district in the House of Representatives. Jeffrey left Kennesaw State and began working at Limestone University, where she chaired the department of political science. By 2011 she was giving lectures at Wofford College and Lander University in South Carolina.

== Selected publications ==
- Explaining Adoption of Foreign-Trade Zones among Sunbelt Cities (Statistical) (dissertation: University of Alabama, 1984).
- Saving the Economy by Reforming the Safety Net (Monograph/book-length manuscript in progress).
- Interviews with Prominent Cobb County Political Figures (Tom Scott and Christina Jeffrey; 5 volume series produced by the Oral History Project of the Southern Center for History and Culture, 1998–2002).
- Torturing History (The Long Term View, Journal of the Massachusetts School of Law. Vol. 4, No. 3, Spring 1999).
- The 1988 State Conventions (The Georgia Historian, Spring 1999).
- Rethinking Affirmative Action (Public Productivity and Management Review, Vol. 20, No. 3, March 1997.).
- Shutting Citizens Up: Thoughts on the Mother's Milk of Politics (Georgia Public Administrator, Vol. 15, No. 2, November 1994.).
- Controlling Health Care Costs (Georgia Public Administrator, May 1993).
- Restoring the Balance: Finding a Way Out of the Social Security Crisis (Family in America, February 1992, Vol. 6, No. 2. (Entire Issue)).
- Family Policy and Social Security (Georgia Public Administrator, November 1991).
- Getting Atlanta Ready for the Olympics (Georgia Public Administrator, April 1991).
- Privatizing Housing (Georgia Public Administrator, March 1990).
