= Meacham (disambiguation) =

Meacham is a surname.

Meacham may also refer to:

== Places ==
- Meacham Lake, New York, United States
- Meacham, Oregon, United States, an unincorporated community
- Meacham, Saskatchewan, Canada, a village

== Other uses ==
- Fort Worth Meacham International Airport, Fort Worth, Texas, United States
- Meacham Elementary School, Tampa, Florida, United States, a former school for African Americans
- Meacham v. Knolls Atomic Power Laboratory, a 2008 Supreme Court case

== See also ==
- Meacham syndrome, a rare genetic disorder
