= Matthew Wasniewski =

American historian

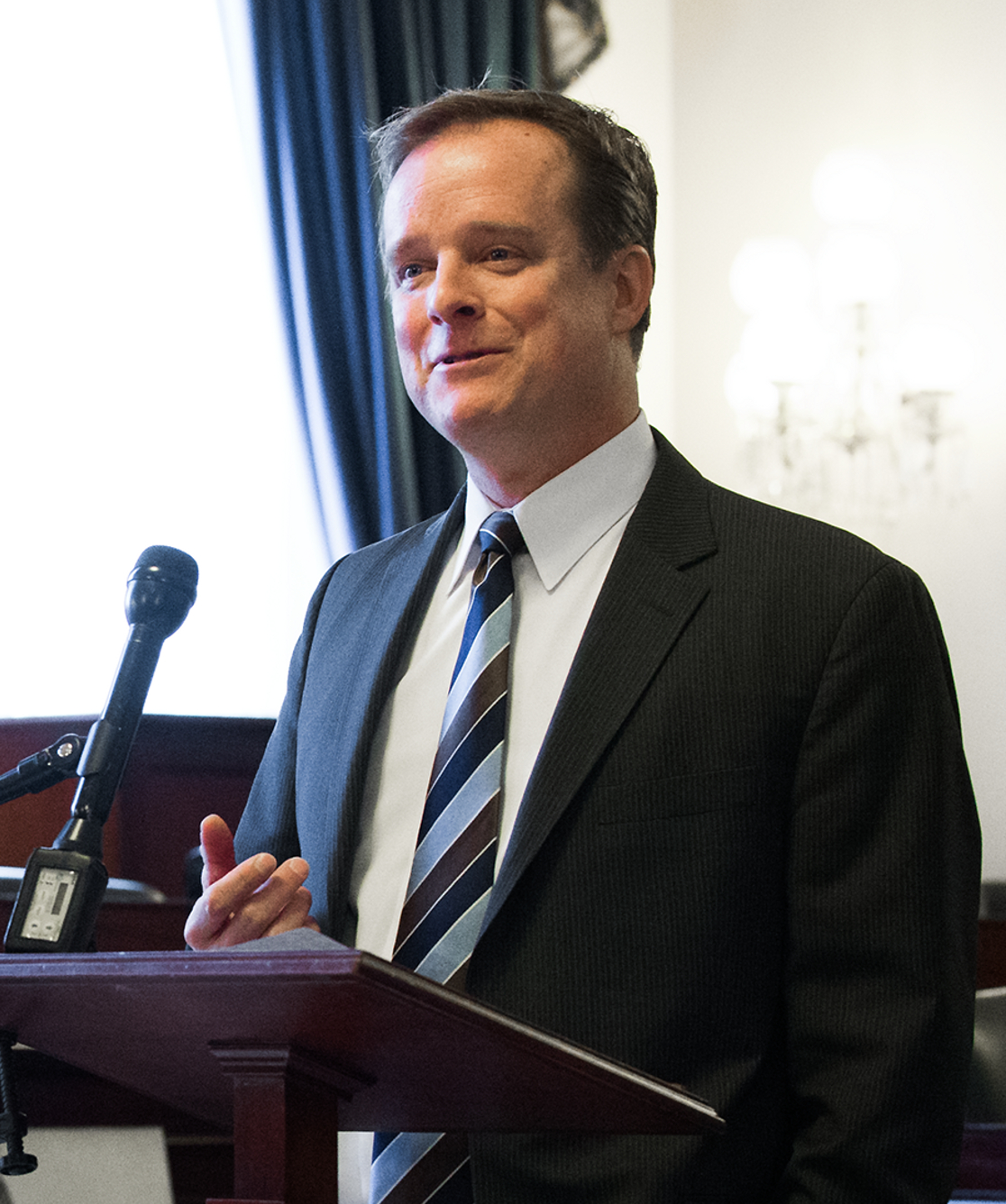

Historian of the United States House of Representatives
- Incumbent
- Assumed office October 20, 2010
- Preceded by: Robert V. Remini

Personal details
- Education: James Madison University (BA, MA); University of Maryland, College Park (PhD)

Matthew A. Wasniewski is an American historian who has served as the fourth Historian of the United States House of Representatives since 2010. Wasniewski had served as a historian within the House Clerk's Office of History and Preservation prior to his appointment.

Wasniewski received a doctorate from the University of Maryland, College Park, in 2004 and received his undergraduate and master's degrees from James Madison University.

Wasniewski's predecessor, Dr. Robert Remini, announced his retirement in 2010 after five years in office. U.S. Speaker of the House Nancy Pelosi announced Wasniewski's appointment as Remini's successor on October 20, 2010. Wasniewski had been unanimously chosen for the position by a House Historian Search Committee consisting of five historians appointed by Pelosi with the input of House Minority Leader John Boehner.
