= Impeachment: An American History =

2018 book

- First edition
- Author: Jon Meacham; Timothy Naftali; Peter Baker; Jeffrey A. Engel
- Publisher: Modern Library

Impeachment: An American History is a 2018 book by Jon Meacham, Timothy Naftali, Peter Baker, and Jeffrey A. Engel, published by Modern Library. Meacham, Naftali, and Baker describe the impeachments (or in the case of Nixon, unfinished impeachment proceedings) of Andrew Johnson, Richard Nixon, and Bill Clinton, respectively. Engel writes about the concept of impeachment and the likelihood of Donald Trump being impeached.

== Reception ==
Publishers Weekly wrote, "Well researched, thoughtful, and engagingly written, this is one of the best of the current books mulling this suddenly fraught question."

== See also ==
- Efforts to impeach Donald Trump
- Impeachment in the United States
- Impeachment of Andrew Johnson
- Impeachment of Bill Clinton
- Impeachment process against Richard Nixon
