= Robert V. Remini =

American historian (1921–2013)

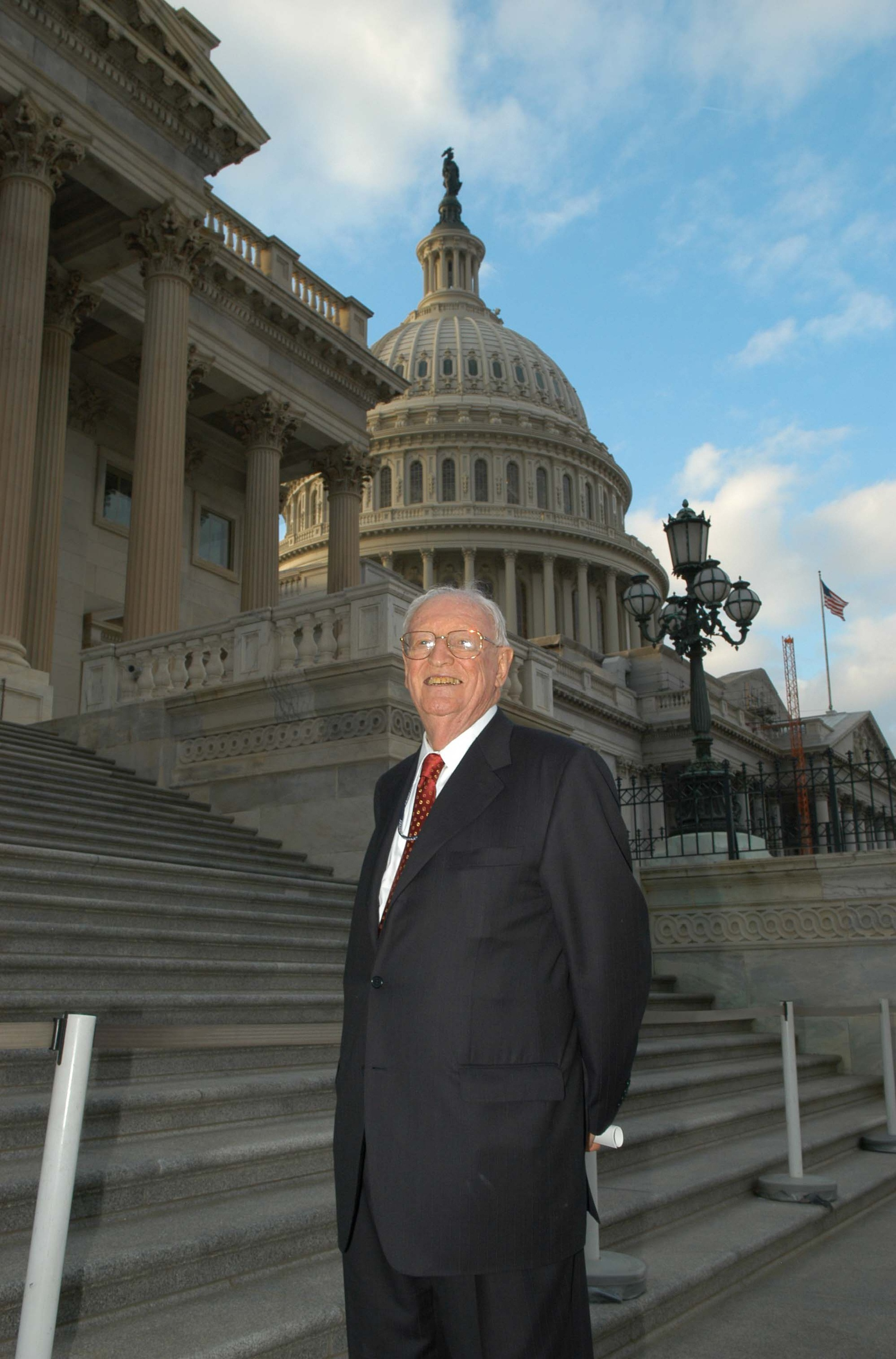
- Remini in 2005
- Born: Robert Vincent Remini; July 17, 1921; New York City, New York, U.S.
- Died: March 28, 2013 (aged 91); Evanston, Illinois, U.S.
- Occupations: Professor, writer
- Spouse: Ruth T. Kuhner

Academic background
- Education: Fordham University (BS); Columbia University (MA, PhD)

Academic work
- Discipline: History
- Main interests: Jacksonian era

Historian of the United States House of Representatives
- In office 2005–2010
- Preceded by: Christina Jeffrey (1995)
- Succeeded by: Matthew Wasniewski

Robert Vincent Remini (July 17, 1921 – March 28, 2013) was an American historian and a professor at the University of Illinois at Chicago. He wrote numerous books about President Andrew Jackson and the Jacksonian era, most notably a three-volume biography of Jackson. For the third volume of Andrew Jackson, subtitled The Course of American Democracy, 1833-1845, he won the 1984 U.S. National Book Award for Nonfiction. Remini was widely praised for his meticulous research on Jackson and thorough knowledge of him. His books portrayed Jackson in a mostly favorable light and he was sometimes criticized for being too partial towards his subject.

Remini also wrote biographies of other early 19th century Americans, namely Martin Van Buren, Henry Clay, Daniel Webster, John Quincy Adams, and Joseph Smith. He served as Historian of the United States House of Representatives from 2005 until 2010 and wrote a history of the House, which was published in 2006.

== Life ==
Robert Vincent Remini was born on July 17, 1921, in New York City. His parents were William Remini and Loretta Tiernay Remini, and he was the elder brother of William and Vincent Remini. His father worked as a credit manager for a coal company. Remini recalled that his original plan in life was to become a lawyer. He explained that this was "not because [he] was intrigued by the law, but because it seemed like a worthy profession then for a child of the Great Depression." Remini received his B.S. from Fordham University in 1943. He then enlisted in the United States Navy and was involved in anti-submarine warfare during World War II. His reading of history while in the Navy caused him to want to be a historian. "I remember we docked at Boston and I went to the library and took out all nine volumes of Henry Adams' history of the U.S. under Jefferson and Madison," he told the Chicago Tribune. "I loved it. Right then I realized that by God, it was history I loved, not law." "When I told my parents, they were shocked," Remini recalled. "'Oh!' they said. 'You will starve.'" Remini married Ruth T. Kuhner, whom he had met in kindergarten, in 1948 and they had three children: Elizabeth Nielson, Joan Costello, and Robert W. Remini.

Remini received his M.A. from Columbia University in 1947 and his PhD from Columbia in 1951. At Columbia, he studied under historian Richard Hofstadter. Hofstadter suggested that he write his dissertation on Martin Van Buren. The dissertation eventually turned into his first book, Martin Van Buren and the Making of the Democratic Party (1959). The book examines Van Buren's role in building a cross-sectional coalition which formed the foundation for the rise of Jacksonian democracy and the eventual creation of the Democratic Party. Remini was named an assistant professor of history at Fordham in 1951 and remained there until 1965. Historian Richard K. McMaster, who graduated from Fordham University in 1962, wrote in 2009 that Remini was great at "making American history an interesting story." McMaster said, "I remember him as a remarkably kind man, genuinely interested in his students and encouraging of our efforts at research. He had the uncanny ability to present the Age of Jackson with such immediacy that you might think he'd had lunch in the Ramskeller with Martin Van Buren. He is an American treasure."

In 1965, Remini joined the faculty of the University of Illinois at Chicago, then known as the University of Illinois at Chicago Circle (UICC). He was the school's first chairman of the History Department, serving in that role from 1965 until 1971. Remini later founded the UIC Institute for the Humanities, which he chaired from 1981 to 1987. Remini retired in 1991. During his career, he served as a visiting professor at the Jilan University of Technology in China, the University of Richmond, the University of Notre Dame, and Wofford College. When writing history, Remini employed self-discipline to try to better himself. "I was trained by Jesuits, and you were rewarded if you did good and punished if you did bad," he said. "I decided that I had to write nine pages a day. And if I did, I got a martini. If not, I didn't."

External videos
- Book party for The House: A History of the House of Representatives, May 23, 2006, C-SPAN
- Presentation by Remini on The House, June 3, 2006, C-SPAN
- Presentation by Remini on The House, September 30, 2006, C-SPAN
- Discussion with Remini on turning points of the U.S. Congress, October 12, 2006, C-SPAN

The House of Representatives passed a measure introduced by Representative John B. Larson, a former high school history teacher, directing the Librarian of Congress to facilitate the writing of a history of the House of Representatives. Remini was then asked by Librarian of Congress James H. Billington to write a Congressional history, The House: The History of the House of Representatives. Remini accepted the task and the book was published in 2006. The book was considered to be "nonpartisan, readable, and stocked with memorable characters." The work led to his appointment as Historian of the United States House of Representatives by Speaker Dennis Hastert on April 28, 2005. He was 83 at the time of his appointment. As House Historian, Remini was credited for his non-partisanship, especially after previous House Historians had been fired over partisan issues. He enjoyed visiting the Library of Congress as House Historian. "He was like a kid in a candy shop," said his daughter, Joan Costello. "He was so tickled and thrilled to be able to read the rare books, documents and letters available to only a few." He retired in 2010 and was succeeded by Matthew Wasniewski.

Remini's wife died in May 2012 at the age of 90. Remini died the following year at Evanston Hospital in Evanston, Illinois on March 28, 2013, after a stroke. He was 91.

== Publications ==
=== Andrew Jackson ===
Remini is best known for his work on America's seventh president Andrew Jackson. After his book on Van Buren, he initially planned on writing a full biography of him until deciding to write about Jackson instead. In the 1960s, Remini wrote a series of short books about Jackson, which were The Election of Andrew Jackson (1963), Andrew Jackson (1966), and Andrew Jackson and the Bank War (1967).

Remini's initial books on Andrew Jackson convinced him to write a fuller account of the man's life. This led to the writing of his book Andrew Jackson, published in three volumes (1977, 1981, 1984), which is considered his magnum opus. It was originally conceived as a single volume, but Remini tried to convince his editor, Hugh Van Dusen, to allow for two. He at first refused, saying, "I can't sell two volumes." Remini recalled, "We were sitting there in the middle of The Marriage of Figaro and he turned to me and he said, 'You can have two volumes,' and that was the beginning of it. Then, when the presidential years grew to be more than another volume, I needed a third volume. I took him to see Tristan und Isolde — and it worked!" The finished series totaled approximately 1,600 pages. "There was an electrifying dynamism about Jackson that I found irresistible," Remini said. He went on to call him "the embodiment of the new American." He added, "This new man was no longer British. He no longer wore the queue and silk pants. He wore trousers, and he had stopped speaking with a British accent."

External videos
- Presentation by Remini on the presidency of Andrew Jackson, August 3, 1992, C-SPAN
- Presentation by Remini on The Battle of New Orleans, October 12, 1999, C-SPAN
- Presentation by Remini on Andrew Jackson and His Indian Wars, July 22, 2001, C-SPAN

Remini took a moderate view of Jackson's behavior during the Bank War. He stated in an interview that he believed that the Second Bank of the United States had "too much power, which it was obviously using in politics. It had too much money which it was using to corrupt individuals. And so Jackson felt he had to get rid of it. It is a pity because we do need a national bank, but it requires control." He refuted the idea that the collapse of the bank was responsible for the Panic of 1837, which he describes as "a world-wide economic collapse", but conceded that it "may have exacerbated" the crisis. Remini partially defended Jackson's Indian removal policies. He held that had Jackson not orchestrated the removal of the Five Civilized Tribes from their ancestral homelands, they would have been totally wiped out, just like other tribes—namely, the Yamasees, Mohicans, and Narragansetts—which did not move.

Remini's books on Jackson have generally received praise. Jon Meacham read Remini's trilogy in high school and later wrote his own biography of Jackson, which Remini read in manuscript form. Meacham said, "He was practicing a kind of narrative historical biographical craft at exactly the moment when most of the academy was moving toward intellectual and group-driven history." He described Remini as "someone who never believed that his interpretation was the last word." Meacham continued, "You cannot write about Jackson without standing on Remini's shoulders." Daniel Walker Howe, a historian who took a rather critical view of Jackson, speaks favorably of Remini, writing: "A forthright admirer of his subject, Remini is laudatory in his assessments of Jackson's achievements. At the same time, he is also a meticulous scholar who does not allow his prejudices to get in the way of the evidence he finds." Of Remini's trilogy, Joel H. Silbey says that "one comes away with the feeling that here is how Jackson saw himself, might have set forth his own case, and wished to be remembered." In his own biography of Jackson, historian H. W. Brands calls Remini's three volume series "[a] monumental work of research and exposition by the dean of Jackson studies." The final volume, Andrew Jackson: The Course of American Democracy, 1833–1845, won the 1984 U.S. National Book Award for Nonfiction. Donald Cole described the full cycle of books as "excellent," commending Remini for "a full scale biography of Jackson based on modern scholarship" by way of clear prose, "skill in the use of chronology, and his ability to identify figures," and an "impressive command of the literature."

While Remini has been credited for his unique focus on Jackson the individual, he has also received criticism for seeing things too much from Jackson's point of view and for identifying too closely with his subject. "No historian knows more about Andrew Jackson than Robert V. Remini," John William Ward, also a Jackson biographer, wrote in a 1981 review of the second volume of the Jackson trilogy, Andrew Jackson and the Course of American Freedom, 1822–1833. He added that Remini "has mastered in all their complex detail the many issues and events of Jackson's private and public life, but in doing so he has come to see the world too much from Jackson's point of view." "Seeing the world through Old Hickory's eyes, we appreciate him as a complex human being," history professor Andrew R.L. Cayton wrote in a New York Times book review of Remini's Andrew Jackson and his Indian Wars (2001). "The problem . . . is that we see the world only through Jackson's eyes...Remini is so obsessed with explicating Jackson's perspective that he neglects the more complicated story in which Indians—as well as presidents—were significant actors." A 1984 review by James M. Banner of the New York Times of the final volume of Remini's Jackson trilogy says that "he cannot be said to be respectful of interpretations more skeptical than his own, nor of being detached." Banner argues that Remini's work is "a biography of the old school, governed by an old strategy and unabashed in its sympathies." He concludes by declaring that Remini's three volumes are not "the right vehicle for what we need." Cole's 1986 review of all three books was generally laudatory but criticized Remini for giving too much credence to Jackson's own rationalizations for his actions, questioning Remini's generally Jackson-favorable characterizations. Per Cole, "Remini's interpretation of Jacksonian Democracy rests upon [the] view that by strengthening the presidency Jackson had led America toward democracy." Cole also objected to Remini's mild treatment of Jackson's white-supremacist actions and rhetoric: "Granted that the charges of racism thrown at the Jacksonians during the past two decades have been influenced by contemporary concern for the rights of minorities, even so the Jacksonians do deserve some criticism. Both Jackson and Van Buren used racist statements in defending their Indian policies...While most white Americans did hold racist views in the early national period, the Democrats' policies certainly were more racist than the Whigs."

In his review of Andrew Jackson and His Indian Wars, Andrew Denson criticizes Remini's "silly" conclusion that Jackson's support for Indian removal saved the Indians from extinction, pointing to the continued existence of other Indian communities east of the Mississippi River as evidence to the contrary. Historian Andrew Burstein stated in his 2003 Jackson biography that "one must read Remini discerningly," charging him with "creative storytelling" that "appears to have imbibed too well the campaign biographies and other works by Jackson's closest associates...Remini has styled an heroic saga that places the individual before all other historical forces, privileging 'greatness' over more useful (and more critical) measures of politics and culture...I would not single out Professor Remini for criticism except that he is the reigning Jackson authority, and his single-minded emphasis on 'greatness' limits the kinds of questions he asks." In a 2011 article, Mark Cheathem argued that Remini downplayed the role of slavery in Jacksonian history, and that his hegemony as a Jackson scholar "seemed to discourage other historians from tackling Jackson's life."

Remini wrote a one-volume abridgment to the original three-volume series, called The Life of Andrew Jackson, which was published in 1988. He delivered a lecture on Jackson at the White House in 1991.

=== Other work ===
External videos
- Booknotes interview with Remini on Henry Clay: Statesman for the Union, April 5, 1992, C-SPAN
- Presentation by Remini on Daniel Webster: The Man and His Time, October 5, 1997, C-SPAN
- Presentation by Remini on Joseph Smith, October 19, 2002, C-SPAN
- Presentation by Remini on A Short History of the United States, October 30, 2008, C-SPAN
- Presentation by Remini on At the Edge of the Precipice, April 30, 2010, C-SPAN
- Presentation by Remini on At the Edge of the Precipice, June 12, 2010, C-SPAN
- In Depth interview with Remini, May 7, 2006, C-SPAN

Remini also wrote biographies of other prominent Americans of the early 19th century, namely Martin Van Buren, Henry Clay, Daniel Webster, John Quincy Adams, and Joseph Smith. His 1991 biography of Clay, entitled Henry Clay: Statesman for the Union, was well received. Brian Boylan of the Los Angeles Times credits Remini for the ability to write a fair biography of Clay even after his extensive work on Jackson, who was Clay's "bitter enemy." Remini "treats Clay with such affection and care that after half a century of being a vague name in pre-Civil War American history, Henry Clay springs to life in all his fascinating brilliance." Historian Otis A. Singletary writes that the biography of Clay was "thoroughly researched and written in a lively and engaging style."

The biography of Webster, published in 1997 as Daniel Webster: The Man and His Time, won the D. B. Hardeman Prize. A review by Richard Latner states:

for specialists, Remini's thoroughness and scope make this work an essential resource on Webster and the indispensable, standard biography....In [his] multivolume, award-winning Jackson study, subject matter and style meshed harmoniously. Indeed, it was easy to overlook the enormous erudition and scholarship behind Remini's bold interpretive assertions and dramatic presentation....The major strength of Remini's biography [of Webster] is certainly its thoroughness. This is a 'life and times' work, and given the significance and scope of Webster's career, it is no minor accomplishment to render an engaging portrait in one volume.

In 2008, Remini published A Short History of the United States, which was just under 400 pages long. According to a book review:

Remini's final chapters are slightly rushed and his judgments too general to be useful, but these flaws are easily overshadowed by his masterful middle sections focusing on the 19th century (his scholarly specialty). In contrast to some surveys of American history, like Howard Zinn's People's History of the United States or William Bennett's America: The Last Best Hope, Remini delivers an objective narrative of this nation's history that readers of all political stripes will appreciate.

His last work was At the Edge of the Precipice: Henry Clay and the Compromise that Saved the Union (2010). The book focuses on Henry Clay's role in engineering the Compromise of 1850. In a review of the book, Russell McClintock praises Remini for his engaging writing style and depiction of Clay, which he calls "both heroic and credible," but accuses him of overemphasizing the importance of compromise and overlooking times when it did not work. McClintock summarized his thoughts by calling the book "a concise and lively account of a critical but understudied episode that, while it breaks no new scholarly ground, does raise valuable points about the importance of compromise in republican government."

== Works ==
The following is a list of all of the books written by Remini.

- Martin Van Buren and the Making of the Democratic Party (1959) online
- The Election of Andrew Jackson (1963) online
- Andrew Jackson (1966) online
- Andrew Jackson and the Bank War: A Study in the Growth of Presidential Power (1967) online
- The Era of Good Feelings and the Age of Jackson, 1816-1841 (1979); with Edwin A. Miles online
- The Revolutionary Age of Andrew Jackson (1985) online
- Andrew Jackson and the Course of American Empire, 1767–1821 (1977) online
- Andrew Jackson and the Course of American Freedom, 1822–1832 (1981) online
- Andrew Jackson and the Course of American Democracy, 1833–1845 (1984) online
- The Life of Andrew Jackson (1988). Abridgment of Remini's earlier three-volume biography. online
- The Jacksonian Era (1989) online
- Henry Clay: Statesman for the Union (1991) online
- Daniel Webster: The Man and His Time (1997) online
- The Battle of New Orleans: Andrew Jackson and America's First Military Victory (1999) online
- Andrew Jackson and His Indian Wars (2001) online
- John Quincy Adams (2002) online
- Joseph Smith (2002) online
- The House: The History of the House of Representatives (2006) online
- Great Generals Series: Andrew Jackson, A Biography (2008) online
- A Short History of the United States (2008) online
- At the Edge of the Precipice: Henry Clay and the Compromise that Saved the Union (2010) online

== See also ==
- Harriet Chappell Owsley – American archivist and historian (1901–1999)
