= Robert J. Morris =

American anti-communist activist

Robert John Morris (September 30, 1914 – December 29, 1996) was an American anti-communist activist who served as chief counsel to the United States Senate Subcommittee on Internal Security from 1951 to 1953 and from 1956 to 1958, was President of the University of Dallas and founded the now-defunct University of Plano.

== Biography ==
Morris grew up in Jersey City, New Jersey, where his father actively opposed Frank Hague, the city's longtime mayor and Democratic Party boss of Hudson County. He was a graduate of Saint Peter's College and the Fordham University School of Law. In 1940, he served on a committee of the New York State Assembly investigating allegations of Communist activities in schools and colleges in New York State.

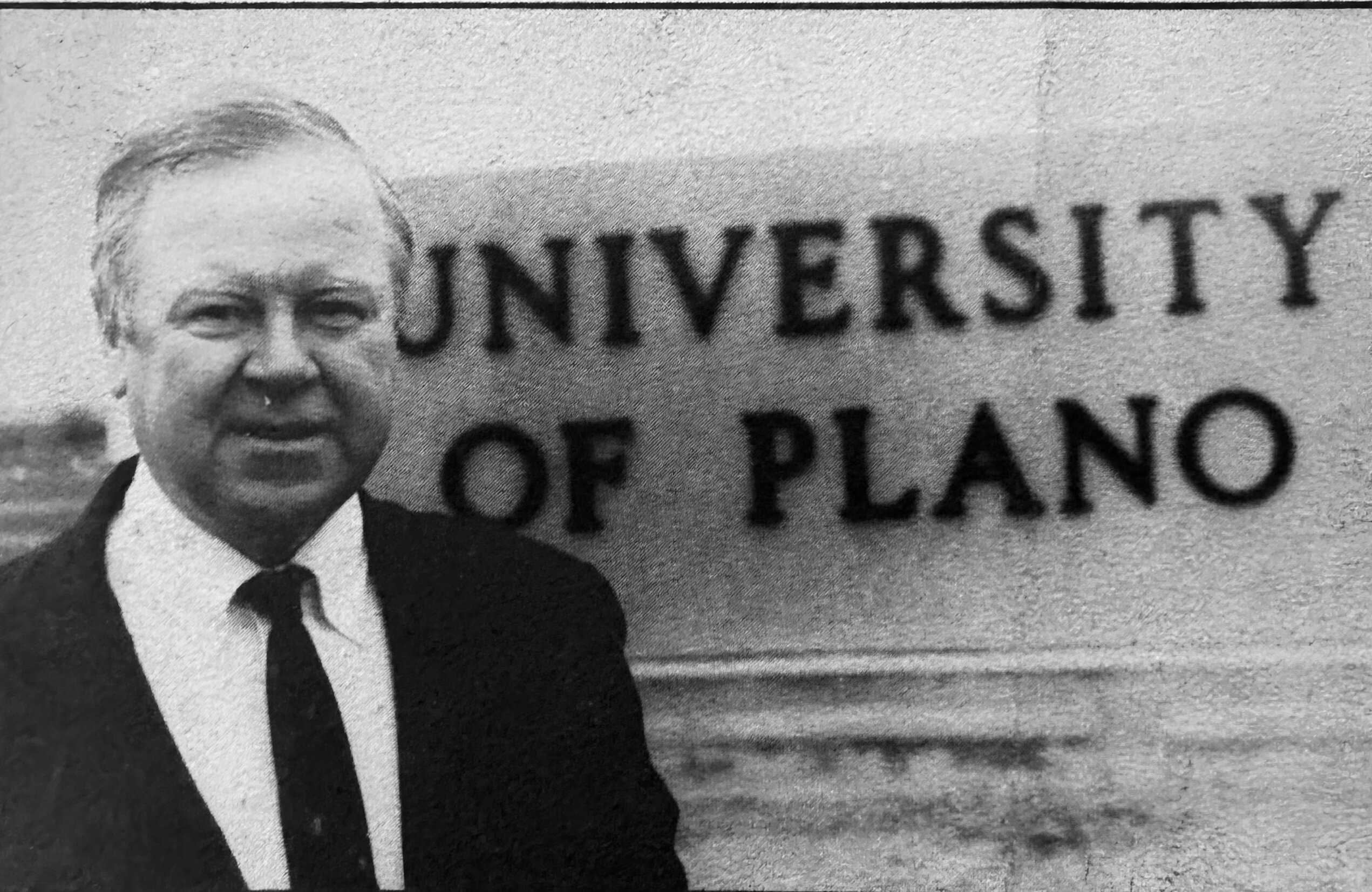
Robert J. Morris in front of University of Plano 1970

He joined the United States Navy during World War II, though he had initially been rejected due to an inability to see the color red, a story that he would frequently retell throughout his life. Morris was a commander of counterintelligence and psychological warfare, whose duties included writing propaganda items that were dropped over Japanese cities and interrogating captured prisoners.

=== Senate Subcommittee on Internal Security ===
Morris served as chief counsel to the Senate Judiciary Subcommittee on Internal Security from 1951 to 1953, leaving the following year when he was elected to serve as a municipal court judge in New York City. He returned as chief counsel from 1956 to 1958.

The New York Times described the subcommittee in 1951 as having a mandate that is practically "limitless in the whole field of security" and that its role "far overreaches the House Committee on Un-American Activities, as it far outreaches Senator Joseph R. McCarthy, Republican of Wisconsin." The subcommittee questioned businessmen, diplomats, scholars and schoolteachers, and opened investigations into an alleged Communist takeover of Hawaii, Communist control of the military-industrial complex, and Communist involvement on waterfront in New York City.

One of the subcommittee's most notorious events was the April 1957 suicide of E. Herbert Norman, the Canadian Ambassador to Egypt, after Norman found out that the subcommittee was reopening an earlier investigation regarding his involvement in a Communist study group. The death affected American-Canadian relations, with Canadians calling his death the result of a "smear campaign" by the subcommittee. Morris had announced a month before the suicide that there was adequate material to justify an investigation into charges that Norman was a Communist.

In a letter written to William F. Buckley, Jr. published in 1969, Whittaker Chambers gave Morris credit for much of the efforts attributed to Senator Joseph McCarthy, with Chambers stating that "I would say that Bob Morris really accomplished much of what the Senator is credited with".

=== Political aspirations ===
In January 1958, as a resident of Point Pleasant Beach, New Jersey, Morris announced that he was running for the Republican Party nomination for the United States Senate from New Jersey, and would resign from his $13,000-a-year post as chief counsel as of January 31. In the April 1958 primary, Robert Kean won the Republican nomination with 43% of the vote, defeating U.S. President Dwight D. Eisenhower's Appointments Secretary Bernard M. Shanley, who had 36%, and Morris, whose 70,000 votes represented more than 20% of the primary votes.

As a resident of Texas, Morris ran for the Republican U.S. Senate nomination in both 1964 and 1970, being defeated both times by George Herbert Walker Bush, a Massachusetts native. In 1976, Morris ran for the conservative American Independent Party's presidential nomination against Louisiana politician John Rarick and former Georgia governor Lester Maddox. Maddox, who had been described as the front-runner prior to the convention, won the nomination on the first ballot, with the support of 177 delegates (52.2%). Morris came in second with 80 delegates (23.6%) and Rarick had 79 (23.3%). In the general election, Maddox would go on to win 170,274 votes (or 0.21%) against Jimmy Carter and Gerald Ford.

Back in New Jersey, Morris entered the 1982 Republican U.S. senatorial primary, dropping out of the race in May, saying that he had accomplished the goals he sought to achieve of bringing attention to Soviet expansionism and moral deterioration. The nomination went to Millicent Fenwick, a liberal Republican congresswoman, who was then defeated by Democrat Frank Lautenberg.

In 1984, Morris again ran in the Republican primary for U.S. Senate, facing off against Mary V. Mochary, the Mayor of Montclair, New Jersey who had been guided by the re-election campaign of Ronald Reagan. Mochary won the June primary with 61% of the vote, with Morris's 70,000 votes representing nearly 29% of the total.

=== Anti-Communist activism ===
Morris was chosen as president of the University of Dallas in 1960. His outspokenness on anti-Communism and other issues created conflict within the school, and he left in 1962.

He formed the Defenders of American Liberties in the summer of 1962, intended to serves as a counterbalance to the American Civil Liberties Union, "but with emphasis on different positions". Among the group's early efforts was to defend former Maj. Gen. Edwin A. Walker, who had been arrested on federal charges after a riot broke out following protests he organized in September 1962 against the use of federal troops to enforce the enrollment of African-American James Meredith at the racially segregated University of Mississippi. In a telegram to members of the Senate Judiciary Committee, Morris called Walker the "United States' first political prisoner", after Walker was denied bail and placed under psychiatric observation for up to 90 days.

Building on the difficulties faced by one of his children, Morris founded the University of Plano in Plano, Texas in 1964 with a focus on the education of mildly disabled college-age students using techniques from the Doman-Delacato Method, such as crawling and creeping, that were intended to stimulate brain development. He remained at the school until 1977 and it closed its doors shortly thereafter.

=== Author and columnist ===
Morris' column Around the World, was published for more than two decades, starting in 1960. The column appeared in newspapers including the Manchester Union Leader and The New York Tribune. His 1963 book Disarmament: Weapon of Conquest achieved a modicum of success after its publication in 1963, one of five books he wrote that mostly focused on the disintegrating world order.

=== Later life ===
A resident of Mantoloking, New Jersey, he died at the age of 82 at Point Pleasant Hospital in Point Pleasant, New Jersey, of congestive heart failure. He had suffered from hydrocephalus in the year prior to his death.
