= The Hope of Glory =

2020 non-fiction book by Jon Meacham

The Hope of Glory: Reflections on the Last Words of Jesus from the Cross
- First edition
- Author: Jon Meacham
- Subject: Jesus
- Genre: History; religion
- Publisher: Convergent Books
- Publication date: 2020
- Publication place: United States
- ISBN: 978-0593236666

The Hope of Glory: Reflections on the Last Words of Jesus from the Cross is a book by Jon Meacham, published by Convergent Books in 2020.

== Summary ==
In the book, which originated as a series of sermons, Meacham examines the last seven phrases Jesus spoke from the cross, according to the gospels.

== Reception ==
Kirkus Reviews called it "a middling contribution to Christian studies". Publishers Weekly called it "eloquent yet inconsistent". Newsweek had included the book in its list of "The 20 Most-Anticipated Books of 2020".
