= Raymond W. Smock =

American historian (born 1941)

Ray Smock

Historian of the United States House of Representatives
- In office 1983–1995
- Preceded by: Position established
- Succeeded by: Christina Jeffrey

Personal details
- Born: February 8, 1941 (age 85)
- Education: Roosevelt University (BA); University of Maryland, College Park (MA, PhD)

Raymond W. Smock (born February 8, 1941) is an American historian, who is the director emeritus of the Robert C. Byrd Center for Congressional History and Education at Shepherd University, and formerly the Historian of the United States House of Representatives (1983–1995).

== Career ==
=== Education ===
Smock received a B.A. in American History from Roosevelt University in Chicago in 1966. He received his Ph.D. in history from the University of Maryland at College Park in 1974.

=== House Historian ===
Smock was a key planner of the national commemorations of the bicentennials of the U. S. Constitution and of the U.S. Congress and oversaw numerous related publications. He was senior historical consultant to WGBH-TV public television in Boston on their 26-part telecourse, A Biography of America (2000). He served as a historical consultant to the National Constitution Center, the first museum dedicated to the U. S. Constitution located on Independence Mall in Philadelphia.

=== Robert C. Byrd Center for Congressional History and Education ===
In 2002, Smock was named the director of the Robert C. Byrd Center for Congressional History and Education. He retired from this position in 2018, but remains on the center's board of directors. The center houses Senator Robert C. Byrd's papers and other corresponding collections and serves as a study and research center on the United States Congress and the U.S. Constitution and conducts public programs and teacher training.

Smock was a consultant, editor, and writer for a DVD called Foundations of Freedom, designed to teach high school students about the Constitution. It was produced by Wheeling Jesuit University and distributed to 25,000 high schools in 2005. For his work on this project Wheeling Jesuit University presented him with the “Foundations of Freedom” award for educating Americans about the U.S. Constitution.

Smock is a member of the adjunct history faculty at Shepherd University, where he teaches U. S. History and Public History.

He served as president of the Association for Documentary Editing, the Society for History in the Federal Government, and the Association of Centers for the Study of Congress.

In 2006, West Virginia Governor Joe Manchin III appointed Smock to the board of the West Virginia Humanities Council. In 2009 he was appointed to the National Historical Publications and Records Commission, an independent agency of the federal government affiliated with the National Archives and Records Administration, where he served until 2016.

== Works ==
Smock's early professional career was as an assistant editor, then co-editor of the 14-volume Booker T. Washington Papers with his colleague Louis R. Harlan, from 1967 to 1982. Smock's biography of Booker T. Washington was published in 2009.

=== Works overseen ===
- The Biographical Directory of the United States Congress, 1774–1989
- Blacks in Congress, 1877–1989
- Women in Congress, 1917–1990
- A Guide to Research Collections of Former Members of the United States House of Representatives, 1789–1987
- The Origins of the U. S. House of Representatives: A Documentary Record.
- Final Report of the Commission on the Bicentenary of the U.S. House of Representatives, 1990: Including a Summary of the Activities and Programs of the Office for the Bicentennial of the House of Representatives, 1983–1989 (1990)

=== Works authored ===
- Booker T. Washington: Black Leadership in the Age of Jim Crow (2009)
- Trump Tsunami: A Historian's Diary of the Trump Campaign and His First Year in Office (2018)
- American Demagogue: Critical Essays on the Trump Presidency (2019)
- Bearing Witness to America's Worst President: Essays on the Trump Disaster (2020)

=== Works edited ===
- Booker T. Washington in Perspective: Essays of Louis R. Harlan (1988)
- Landmark Documents on the U.S. Congress (1999)

=== Works co-authored or contributed to ===
- Talent for Detail: The Photographs of Miss Frances Benjamin Johnston, 1889–1910 with Pete Daniel (1974)
- American history slide collection, compiled and edited by Raymond W. Smock, William M. Stowe, Jr., and Pete Daniel (1977)
- Guide to Manuscripts in the Presidential Libraries, compiled and edited by Dennis A. Burton, James B. Rhoads, and Raymond W. Smock (1985)
- Encyclopedia of the United States Congress (4 vols.) (1995)
- Masters of the House: Congressional Leadership over Two Centuries by Roger Harry Davidson (1936 - 2021), Susan Webb Hammond (1933 - 2016), and Raymond W. Smock (1998)
- The Booker T. Washington Papers with Louis R. Harlan (14 vols.) (1972–1983)
- Booker T. Washington in Perspective: Essays of Louis R. Harlan, edited by Raymond W. Smock (2006)
- Congress Investigates: A Critical and Documentary History, edited by Roger A. Bruns, David L. Hostetter, and Raymond W. Smock (Robert C. Byrd Center for Legislative Studies, 2011)

=== Articles ===
- "Public History at the U.S. House of Representatives"
