= The Soul of America =

2018 nonfiction book

The Soul of America: The Battle for Our Better Angels
- Author: Jon Meacham
- Publisher: Random House
- Publication date: 8 May 2018
- Publication place: United States
- ISBN: 978-0-399-58981-2 (Hardcover)

The Soul of America: The Battle for Our Better Angels is a 2018 book by Jon Meacham, published by Random House. It entered The New York Times' list of best selling non-fiction books at number one.

== Content ==
The book is a history of America from colonial days to those of Donald Trump. In seven chapters plus an introduction and conclusion, it traces the ups and downs of public issues including race, civil rights, immigration, women's suffrage and rights and internal and external threats to the democratic process, including the Ku Klux Klan and Communism. It ends with more than 100 pages of notes, references and an index.

== Documentary ==
On October 14, 2020, it was announced that a documentary based on the book would be premiered on October 27, 2020, on HBO and HBO Max.

== See also ==
- The New York Times Non-Fiction Best Sellers of 2018
