= Historian of the United States House of Representatives =

American government official

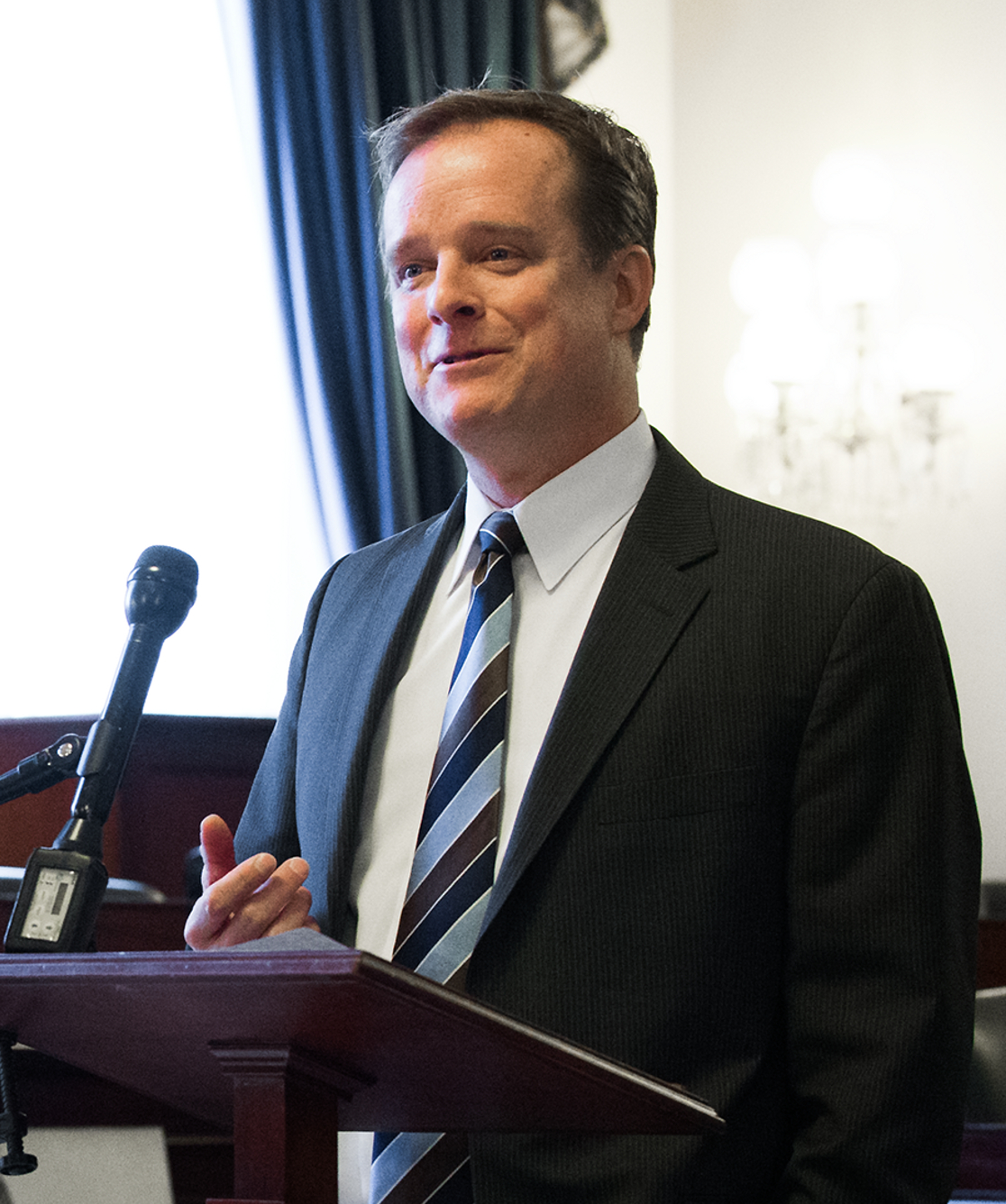
- Incumbent; Matthew Wasniewski since 2010
- Appointer: United States House of Representatives
- Formation: 1983
- First holder: Raymond W. Smock

The historian of the United States House of Representatives is an official appointed by the United States House of Representatives to study and document its past. The House historian heads the Office of the House Historian, which serves as the institutional memory for the institution. The current historian of the House is Matthew Wasniewski.

== Purpose ==
According to the official website for the House of Representatives:

The Office of the Historian studies and documents the rich history of the United States House of Representatives as a resource for Members, staff, scholars, the media, and the public. It both serves as the House's institutional memory and strives to inspire greater understanding about that body's central role in U.S. history.

Since the First Federal Congress convened in New York City in April 1789, the U.S. House of Representatives has grown from 65 Representatives to 435. The House's evolving rules and procedures have filled many volumes, and, over time, it developed unique traditions and practices. During the past two centuries, Americans have elected more than 11,000 people to the House (far more than any other branch of government), reaffirming the founders’ intent that it be open and responsive to the people.

The Office of the Historian collects and provides information to the widest possible audience on all aspects of the House's rich history spanning more than two centuries: important events, people, precedents, dates, and statistics. It maintains the House's major historical publications including The Biographical Directory of the United States Congress and a series of volumes on women and minorities who have served in Congress.

The office also conducts and publishes oral history interviews with former senior staff and Members of Congress. The House's institutional history website, history.house.gov, is a collaborative project between the Office of the Historian and the Clerk of the House's Office of Art and Archives. Together, the offices' online presences serves to preserve, collect, and interpret the heritage of the U.S. House, serving as the institution's memory and a resource for Members, staff, and the general public.

== History ==
The post was first created in 1983 and its first holder was University of Maryland, College Park historian Raymond W. Smock. In a move that was seen by many as politically motivated, Smock was fired by the new Speaker of the House, Newt Gingrich, when the Republican Party took control of the House in January 1995.

In his place, Gingrich appointed Christina Jeffrey, a political scientist from Kennesaw State University, to the post. However, a controversy arose over comments Jeffrey had made in 1986, while evaluating a program called Facing History and Ourselves for the US Department of Education. She wrote, "The program gives no evidence of balance or objectivity. The Nazi point of view, however unpopular, is still a point of view and is not presented, nor is that of the Ku Klux Klan." Democrats and Jewish groups expressed outrage at the comments, but Jeffrey called the allegations against her "slanderous and outrageous." Gingrich dismissed her six days after she took up the post. (Following a meeting with Jeffrey several months after her dismissal, Abraham Foxman, the National Director of the Anti-Defamation League, wrote that the ADL was "satisfied that any characterization of you as anti-Semitic or sympathetic to Nazism is entirely unfounded and unfair.")

The post remained vacant for the next decade. In 2005, House Speaker Dennis Hastert appointed Robert V. Remini to the post. Prior to his appointment, Remini had been commissioned by Librarian of Congress James H. Billington to write a history of the House of Representatives, as provided by the House Awareness and Preservation Act of 1999. The book he wrote, The House: The History of the House of Representatives, was awarded the George Pendleton Prize. Remini retired in 2010.

In 2010, Speaker of the House Nancy Pelosi, with the cooperation of House minority leader John Boehner, appointed a panel of historians to conduct a search for Remini's replacement. Their unanimous recommendation was Matthew Wasniewski, then serving as the historian in the House Clerk's Office of History and Preservation. Wasniewski's appointment was announced in October, 2010.

== List of House historians ==
- Ray Smock 1983–1995
- Christina Jeffrey 1995
- Vacant 1995–2005
- Robert V. Remini 2005–2010
- Matthew Wasniewski 2010–present
