= Jon Meacham =

American journalist and biographer (born 1969)

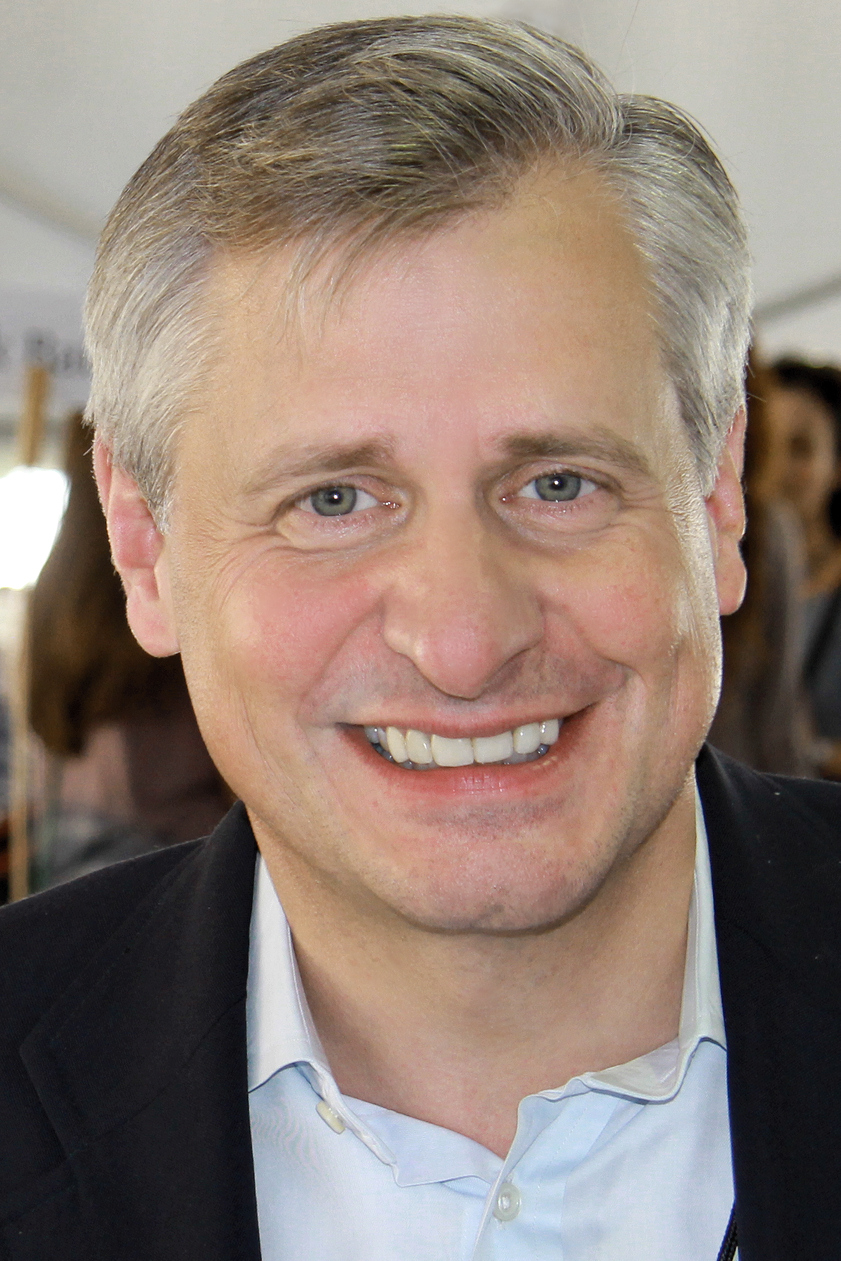
- Meacham in 2014
- Born: Jon Ellis Meacham; May 20, 1969 (age 57); Chattanooga, Tennessee, U.S.
- Education: University of the South (BA)
- Occupations: Writer; journalist; editor; historian
- Spouse: Margaret Keith Smythe (m. 1996)
- Children: 3
- Awards: Pulitzer Prize for Biography or Autobiography
- Website: Official website

Jon Ellis Meacham (/ˈmiːtʃəm/; born May 20, 1969) is an American writer, reviewer, historian and presidential biographer who is serving as the Canon Historian of the Washington National Cathedral since November 7, 2021. A former executive editor and executive vice president at Random House, he is a contributing writer to The New York Times Book Review, a contributing editor to Time magazine, and a former editor-in-chief of Newsweek. He is the author of several books. He won the 2009 Pulitzer Prize for Biography or Autobiography for American Lion: Andrew Jackson in the White House. He holds the Carolyn T. and Robert M. Rogers Endowed Chair in American Presidency at Vanderbilt University.

== Early life and education ==
Meacham was born in Chattanooga, Tennessee. His parents are Jere Ellis Meacham (1946–2008), a construction and labor-relations executive who was decorated for valor during the Vietnam War, and Linda (McBrayer) Brodie. His paternal grandparents, Ellis K. Meacham and Jean Austin Meacham, raised him after his parents' divorce. When he was a child, his grandfather had discussions each morning with a group of men about local and national politics. As a result, Meacham developed an interest in politics. He received an invitation to Ronald Reagan's 1981 inauguration in Washington, D.C., in response to a letter that he sent to the president-elect.

Meacham attended The McCallie School, (Note: He read Robert V. Remini's three-volume biography of Jackson while in high school. Remini read Meacham's biography of Jackson in manuscript.) where he developed an interest in the civil rights movement. He then went on to attend Sewanee: The University of the South where he graduated salutatorian and summa cum laude in 1991 with a Bachelor of Arts degree in English literature and was elected to Phi Beta Kappa.

== Career ==
=== Journalist and editor ===
After college, he worked at The Chattanooga Times, until he moved to Washington, D.C., in 1993 and became co-editor of Washington Monthly. In 1995, he worked for Newsweek as the national affairs editor, and became managing editor in late-1998. (Note: The Star-Herald reported that Meacham became Managing Editor after three months on the job.) In 2006, he became editor-in-chief of Newsweek's print and online formats.

A former executive editor and executive vice president at Random House, he is a contributing writer to The New York Times Book Review and The Washington Post, and a contributing editor to Time magazine. (Note: Meacham has been strongly critical of President Donald Trump; in a 2018 New York Times article, he compared Trump to the Rev. Charles Coughlin, a Catholic priest known for his passionate radio sermons sprinkled with antisemitism. Meacham also drew an unfavorable comparison of Trump's manner of speaking with the more eloquent styles of Franklin D. Roosevelt and Ronald Reagan.)

=== Biographer and book author ===
He was the editor for Voices in Our Blood: America's Best on the Civil Rights Movement which was released in 2001. Spanning the period from 1941 to 1998, the book includes writings of noted civil-rights leaders, novelists, and journalists, like John Lewis, James Baldwin, William Faulkner, and David Halberstam. His book, Franklin and Winston, An Intimate Portrait of an Epic Friendship about Franklin D. Roosevelt and Winston Churchill, was released in 2003 and was awarded The Colby Prize in 2005.

Meacham has explored America's leaders in such works as Thomas Jefferson: The Art of Power as well as his biography of Andrew Jackson, American Lion, which won the 2009 Pulitzer Prize for Biography or Autobiography. Jill Abramson writing in a book review in The New York Times states that Meacham's books are "well researched, drawing on new anecdotal material and up-to-date historiographical interpretations" and presents his "subjects as figures of heroic grandeur despite all-too-human shortcomings". In his biography of Jefferson, Meacham identifies qualities that would be helpful in the current political arena, "Jefferson repeatedly reached out to his enemies and showed ideological flexibility." Regarding the former president's stance on slavery, Meacham states, "Slavery was the rare subject where Jefferson's sense of realism kept him from marshaling his sense of hope in the service of the cause of reform."

Selected by the Bush family to be the official biographer for George H. W. Bush, Meacham's book, Destiny and Power: The American Odyssey of George Herbert Walker Bush, was published in 2015. He gave eulogies for both President Bush and Barbara Bush when they died in 2018.

=== Other appearances ===
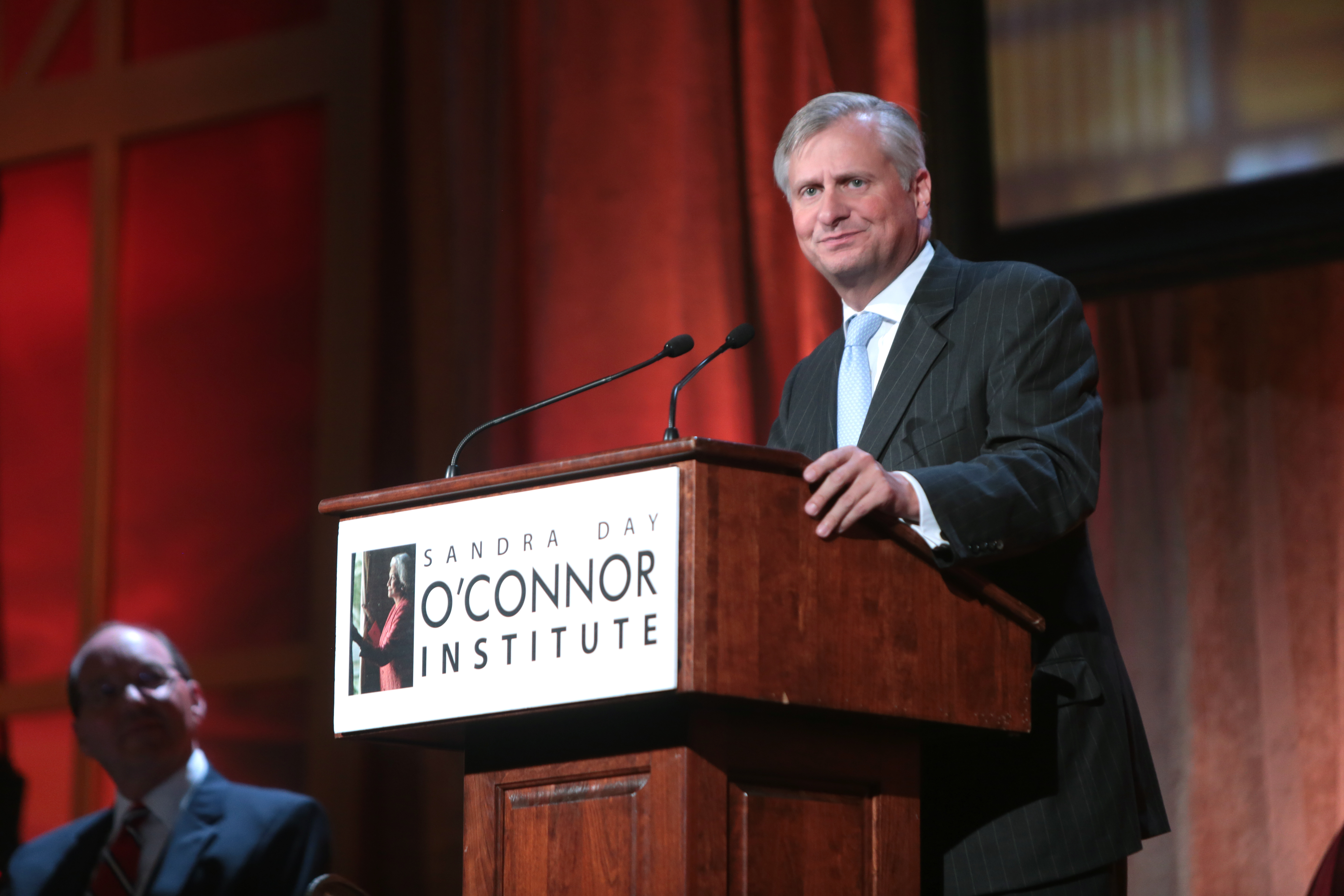
Meacham speaking at the Sandra Day O'Connor Institute in 2016

Over the years Meacham has been a frequent guest on various talk shows such as Charlie Rose, The Daily Show with Jon Stewart, The Colbert Report, and Real Time with Bill Maher. From May 2010 to April 2011, Meacham was co-host with Alison Stewart of Need to Know on PBS. He is also a frequent guest on CBS This Morning, Face the Nation, MSNBC's Morning Joe, and The Late Show with Stephen Colbert.

In 2014, Meacham appeared in Ken Burns' documentary series The Roosevelts: An Intimate History on PBS. He also appeared in a cameo in the 2018 film The Front Runner.

Meacham taught history at his alma mater, the University of the South, in 2014. He was a visiting professor of political science at Vanderbilt University before being appointed to the Carolyn T. and Robert M. Rogers Chair in American Presidency. Meacham is also the co-chair of the Vanderbilt Project on Unity and American Democracy at Vanderbilt University.

In 2026 he was an Executive Producer and appeared as a historian on The History Channel series WWII.

=== Politics ===
Meacham was asked to speak at the 2020 Democratic National Convention on the Soul of America. He endorsed Joe Biden, saying, "history, which will surely be our judge, can also be our guide. From Seneca Falls to Selma to Stonewall, we're at our best when we build bridges, not walls". According to The New York Times, Meacham was part of the team writing some of Joe Biden's speeches for the 2020 United States presidential election, including Biden's acceptance speech, and his 2024 State of the Union address.

In November 2022, Meacham helped Nancy Pelosi, the Speaker of the United States House of Representatives, write a speech announcing that she would not seek reelection to House Democratic leadership in the 118th United States Congress.

== Accolades and organizations ==
Organizations	Year	Award	Result	Ref.
Pulitzer Prize	2009	Biography or Autobiography (Note: American Lion: Andrew Jackson in the White House)	Honored	
Anti-Defamation League	2013	Hubert H. Humphrey First Amendment Prize	Honored	
Historical Society of Pennsylvania	2013	Founder's Award	Honored	
Sandra Day O’Connor Institute	2016	The Spirit of Democracy Award	Honored	
The Lincoln Forum	2022	Richard Nelson Current Achievement Award	Honored	
World Economic Forum	N/A	Named a "Global Leader for Tomorrow"	Honored	
Society of American Historians	N/A	A Fellow	Honored	
Council on Foreign Relations	N/A	Member	Honored	
Thomas Jefferson Foundation	N/A	Trustee	Honored	
Andrew Jackson Foundation	N/A	Trustee	Honored	
Washington University in St. Louis	N/A	Chairs the national advisory board (Note: Specially at the John C. Danforth Center on Religion and Politics)	Honored	
The University of the South	N/A	Distinguished visiting professor of history	Honored	
Vanderbilt University	N/A	A visiting distinguished professor	Honored	

== Honorary doctorates ==
Meacham has also been awarded honorary doctorates from several universities:

Institution	Year	Degree	Result	Ref.
Yale University	2005	Doctor of Humane Letters (Note: Specifically at Berkeley Divinity School)	Honored	
Dickinson College	2010	Doctor of Humane Letters	Honored	
The University of the South	2010	D.Litt.	Honored	(Note: Several sources:)
Loyola University New Orleans	2012	DHL	Honored	
Wake Forest University	2017	D.Litt.	Honored	
Middlebury College	2017	D.Litt.	Honored	
University of Tennessee	2017	DHL	Honored	
University of Massachusetts Lowell	2018	Doctor of Humane Letters	Honored	
Millsaps College	2019	Honorary doctorate	Honored	

== Personal life ==
As of 2014, Meacham resides in Belle Meade, Tennessee. He married Margaret Keith Smythe, called Keith, in 1996. At the time of their marriage, she was a teacher, having studied at the University of Virginia and the University of Provence. She taught in Metz, France under a Fulbright Scholarship. They have three children.

Meacham is an Episcopalian, and was chosen as Canon Historian of Washington National Cathedral in 2021.

== Bibliography ==
Title	Year	ISBN	Publisher	Subject matter	Interviews, presentations, and reviews	Notes
[Editor] Voices in Our Blood: America's Best on the Civil Rights Movement	2001	ISBN 978-0-375-75881-2	Random House	Civil rights movement	Washington Journal interview with Meacham on Voices In Our Blood, February 21, 2001, C-SPAN	(Note: Meacham was editor of this book)
Franklin and Winston: An Intimate Portrait of an Epic Friendship	2003	ISBN 978-0-8129-7282-5	Random House	Franklin Roosevelt, Winston Churchill	Presentation by Meacham on Franklin and Winston, November 5, 2003, C-SPAN; Booknotes interview with Meacham on Franklin and Winston, January 5, 2004, C-SPAN; Presentation by Meacham on Franklin and Winston, January 30, 2019, C-SPAN; Meacham discusses Franklin & Winston: An Intimate Portrait of an Epic Friendship at the Pritzker Military Museum & Library	
American Gospel: God, the Founding Fathers, and the Making of a Nation	2006	ISBN 978-0-8129-7666-3	Random House	History of religion / Founding Fathers	Interview with Meacham on American Gospel, June 14, 2006, C-SPAN	
American Lion: Andrew Jackson in the White House	2008	ISBN 978-1-4000-6325-3	Random House	Andrew Jackson	Presentation by Meacham on American Lion, November 16, 2008, C-SPAN; Washington Journal interview with Meacham on American Lion, December 18, 2008, C-SPAN; Presentation by Meacham on American Lion, September 26, 2009, C-SPAN; Interview with Meacham on American Lion, September 26, 2009, C-SPAN	(Note: This book won the 2009 Pulitzer Prize for Biography or Autobiography)
[Editor] American Homer: Reflections on Shelby Foote and His Classic The Civil War: A Narrative	2001	ISBN 9780679643708	Random House	Shelby Foote, The Civil War: A Narrative		(Note: Meacham was editor of this work, which is available as part of Random House's 2011 edition of the boxed set of Foote's Civil War trilogy)
Thomas Jefferson: The Art of Power	2012	ISBN 978-1-4000-6766-4	Random House	Thomas Jefferson	Presentation by Meacham on Thomas Jefferson: The Art of Power, November 14, 2012, C-SPAN	
Destiny and Power: The American Odyssey of George Herbert Walker Bush	2015	ISBN 978-1-4000-6765-7	Random House	George H. W. Bush	Presentation by Meacham on Destiny and Power, November 8, 2015, C-SPAN; Discussion with Meacham and George W. Bush about the life and career of George H.W. Bush, November 8, 2015, C-SPAN; Presentation by Meacham on Destiny and Power, November 21, 2015, C-SPAN; Presentation by Meacham on Destiny and Power, September 24, 2016, C-SPAN	
The Soul of America: The Battle for Our Better Angels	2018	ISBN 978-0-3995-8981-2	Random House	History of the United States	Presentation by Meacham on The Soul of America, May 9, 2018, C-SPAN; Washington Journal interview with Meacham on The Soul of America, May 23, 2018, C-SPAN; Presentation by Meacham on The Soul of America, September 1, 2018, C-SPAN; Presentation by Meacham on The Soul of America, January 31, 2019, C-SPAN	
[Co-author] Impeachment: An American History	2018	ISBN 978-1984853783	Modern Library	Impeachment of Andrew Johnson	Panel discussion with Meacham, Naftali, Baker, and Engel on Impeachment: An American History, February 20, 2019, C-SPAN	(Note: Meacham wrote the portion of this book about the Impeachment of Andrew Johnson. Three other writers wrote on impeachment efforts related to other presidents: Timothy Naftali (Nixon), Peter Baker (Clinton), and Jeffrey A. Engel (Trump).)
[Co-author] Songs of America: Patriotism, Protest, and the Music That Made a Nation	2019	ISBN 978-0-5931-3295-1	Random House	Music of the United States	Presentation by Meacham and Tim McGraw on Songs of America, January 29, 2020, C-SPAN	(Note: Written with Tim McGraw.)
The Hope of Glory: Reflections on the Last Words of Jesus from the Cross	2020	ISBN 978-0-5932-3666-6	Convergent Books	Sayings of Jesus on the cross		
His Truth Is Marching On: John Lewis and the Power of Hope	2020	ISBN 978-1-9848-5502-2	Random House	John Lewis	Presentation by Meacham on His Truth Is Marching On, September 26, 2020, C-SPAN; Interview with Meacham on His Truth Is Marching On, September 26, 2020, C-SPAN; Panel discussion featuring Meacham on John Lewis, March 23, 2021, C-SPAN	
And There Was Light: Abraham Lincoln and the American Struggle	2022	ISBN 978-0-553-39396-5	Random House	Abraham Lincoln	Interview with Meacham on And There Was Light, October 24, 2022, C-SPAN	
[Editor] American Struggle: Democracy, Dissent, and the Pursuit of a More Perfect Union: An Anthology	2026	ISBN 978-0-593-59755-2	Random House	History of the United States		
