= And There Was Light =

Jon Meacham biography of Abraham Lincoln

And There Was Light: Abraham Lincoln and the American Struggle
- Hardcover edition
- Author: Jon Meacham
- Language: English
- Subject: Abraham Lincoln
- Genre: Biography
- Publisher: Random House
- Publication date: October 2022
- Publication place: United States
- Media type: Print, e-book, audio
- Pages: 676
- ISBN: 978-0-553-39396-5
- OCLC: 1305911410
- Website: Random House

And There Was Light: Abraham Lincoln and the American Struggle is a biography of Abraham Lincoln by Jon Meacham, published in 2022 by Random House. The book shows how Lincoln risked his political future for his moral convictions, intending to preserve democracy and the Union.

And There Was Light was a commercial success, debuting at number 2 on The New York Times Best Seller list.

== Synopsis ==
The book reinterprets Lincoln's life to reflect the nation's current political situation. Meacham emphasizes Lincoln's public actions, highlighting his speeches, inaugurations, and his critical decisions as a leader.
