= Mechem =

Mechem is a surname. Notable people with the surname include:

- Edwin L. Mechem (1912–2002), Governor of New Mexico and US Senator
- Kirke Mechem (born 1925), American composer
- Merritt C. Mechem (1870–1946), American lawyer and politician

== See also ==
- Mecham
- Meacham
