= Destiny and Power =

2015 book by Jon Meacham

Destiny and Power: The American Odyssey of George Herbert Walker Bush
- First edition
- Author: Jon Meacham
- Subject: George H. W. Bush
- Publisher: Random House
- Publication date: 2015
- Publication place: United States

Destiny and Power: The American Odyssey of George Herbert Walker Bush is a 2015 book by Jon Meacham about George H. W. Bush.

== Critical reception ==
The New York Times wrote that the book "reflects the qualities of both subject and biographer: judicious, balanced, deliberative, with a deep appreciation of history and the personalities who shape it." Kirkus Reviews called it "meticulously researched but perhaps overlong," writing that "Meacham does his best with this 'underwhelming' but noble subject." Publishers Weekly called Destiny and Power "a vivid, well-written account that doesn't quite come to grips with its subject's pivotal place in history."
