= William Meacham =

American archaeologist

William Meacham (Chinese: 秦維廉) is an American archaeologist living and working in Hong Kong since 1970. Meacham has written several books on archaeology in southern China.

In 1977, he published an article on South China archaeology in the journal Current Anthropology, opposing the then general consensus that innovations spread south from the Central Plains of North China. This "nuclear area hypothesis" was promoted by Kwang-chih Chang, the prominent doyen of ancient China archaeology. In 2000, in a preface to his own Festschrift, Chang acknowledged: "On the concept of 'Regional Cultures,' I was very much a late-comer. Judith Treistman (1972) and William Meacham (1977) were both pioneers on this question."

Meacham has written several papers and a book on the restoration of the Shroud of Turin in 2002, where Meacham is questioning the restoration methods used by the Catholic Church.

He located a Confederate burial ground of 227 soldiers in Hopkinsville, Kentucky. In researching the epidemic that killed these soldiers encamped at Hopkinsville in 1861, Meacham developed a hypothesis that the disease, at the time called "Black Measles", was influenza. He published a lengthy article on the subject.
