= Daniel Feller =

American historian

Daniel Feller is an American historian, who was named Distinguished Professor Emeritus at University of Tennessee upon his retirement in 2020.

Feller earned his Ph.D. from the University of Wisconsin in 1981. His chief interests include early and mid 19th century American history. He is the author of The Public Lands in Jacksonian Politics and The Jacksonian Promise: America, 1815-1840. Since 2004, Feller and a team of historians have been collaborating on a project to compile the writings of Andrew Jackson in a multi-volume series, The Papers of Andrew Jackson.

== Books ==
- 1984: The Public Lands in Jacksonian Politics
- 1995: The Jacksonian Promise: America, 1815-1840

== See also ==
American Historiography
