= University of Plano =

Private university in Plano, Texas, U.S. (1964-77)

Coordinates: 33.0354°N 96.7929°W

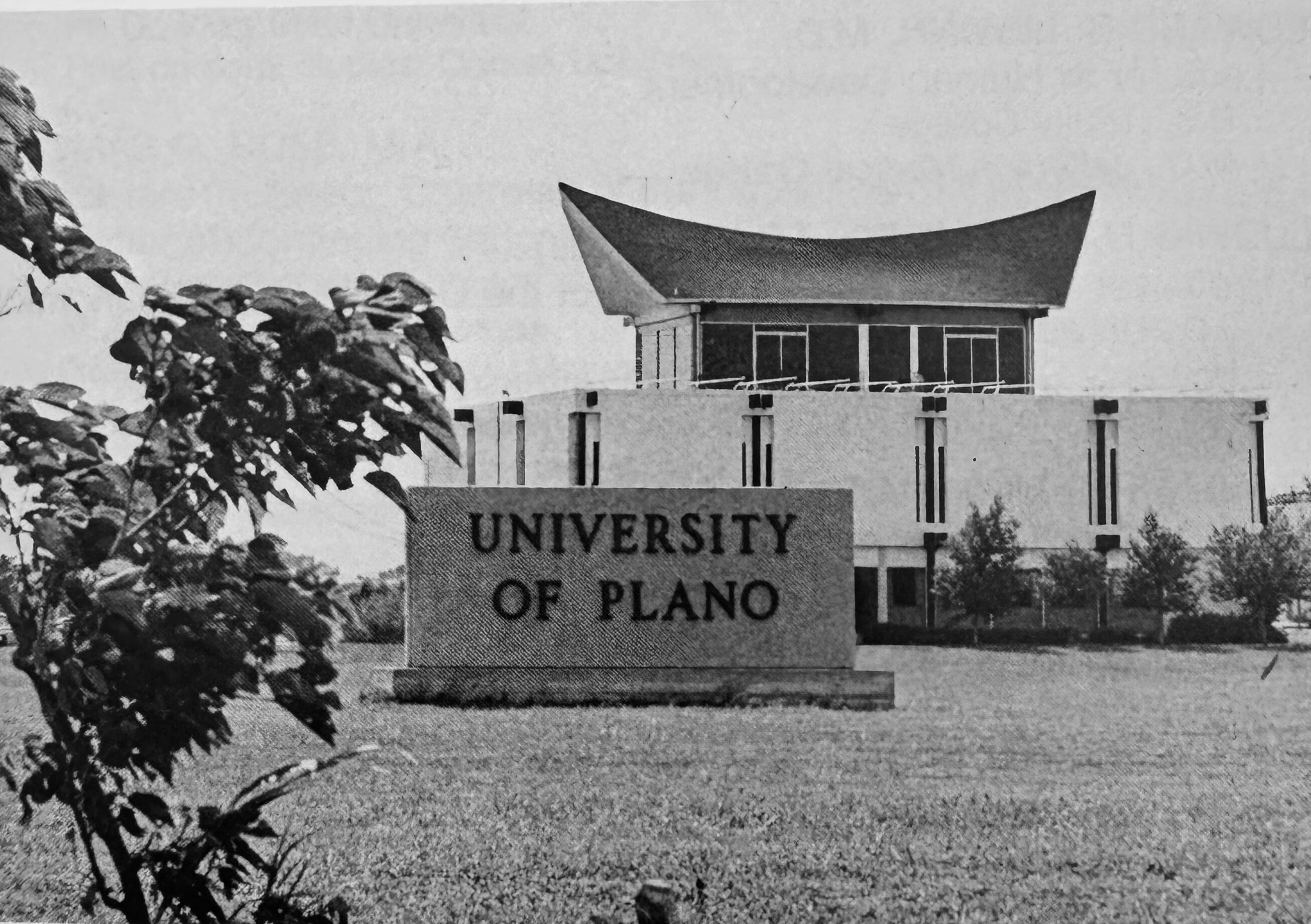
University of Plano 1971

The University of Plano was an American private liberal arts college located in Plano, Texas that was in operation from 1964 until 1977.

The University of Plano received its charter from the State of Texas on May 8, 1964 as a private, coeducational, nondenominational institution. The school was originally called the University of Lebanon, changing its name effective September 4, 1964 to reflect the location of its campus. The university's first classes were held in space leased in downtown Dallas in the fall of 1965.

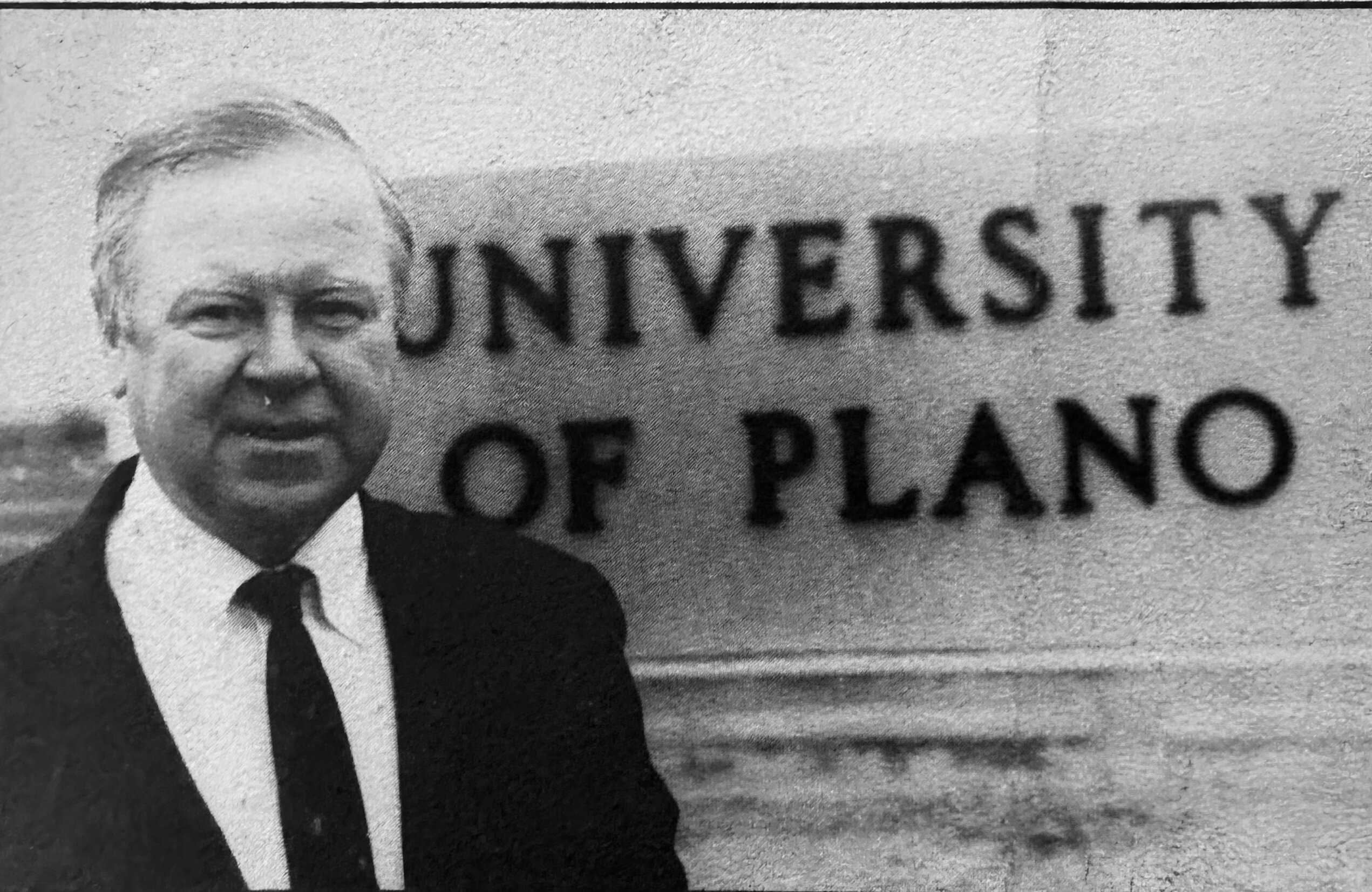
Robert J. Morris in front of University of Plano 1970

The school was founded in 1964 by Robert J. Morris, an attorney and former judge known as an anti-Communist. Morris had served as chief counsel the United States Senate Subcommittee on Internal Security. Morris had been the president of the University of Dallas from 1960 to 1962. Building on the difficulties faced by one of his children, Morris founded the school in 1964. He remained at the school until 1977 and it closed its doors shortly thereafter.

Morris decided to build a school focusing on the Doman-Delacato Method. Using $250,000 borrowed from Republic National Life of Dallas, he put a down payment on 680 acres (2.8 km^{2}) of land in northwest Plano. With $600,000 raised from a bond issue, he persuaded the government of Malaysia to donate to the school the nation's pavilion from the 1964 New York World's Fair, with the pagoda becoming the main building of the university.

The school had no endowment to speak of, other than the land where its campus was located on Custer Road. The school's finances depended on rising values for the land it had purchased, based on the assumption that the growth of the Dallas area would push residential development towards Plano and hopes that portions of the land could be rezoned for commercial use, both of which would drive up the value of the land. Property purchased by Morris for the University in 1964 for $1,800 an acre, sold in 1969 for $3,000 an acre, and could obtain as much as $6,300 an acre by 1971. 15 acres (61,000 m^{2}) of the school's land was rezoned for a shopping center and an additional 4 acres (16,000 m^{2}) was rezoned for small retail.

Despite warnings offered as far back as 1967, the school developed a heavy reliance on land speculation to meet its expenses. With the end of the land boom in 1975, the school was unable to use land sales to fund its activities. The school ran short of funds in 1976, and despite ownership of 698 acres (2.82 km^{2}) and twenty buildings, was forced to close in July 1976.

Records from the former University are not complete and many are not available as they were privately held by Dr. Robert Morris for some time. The chain of custody is unclear and many graduates have been unable to recover records. An alumni site was available at Universityofplano.org. Though still registered as of June 2017, the site only has a parking redirect link from GoDaddy.com.
