= Timothy Naftali =

Canadian-American historian (born 1962)

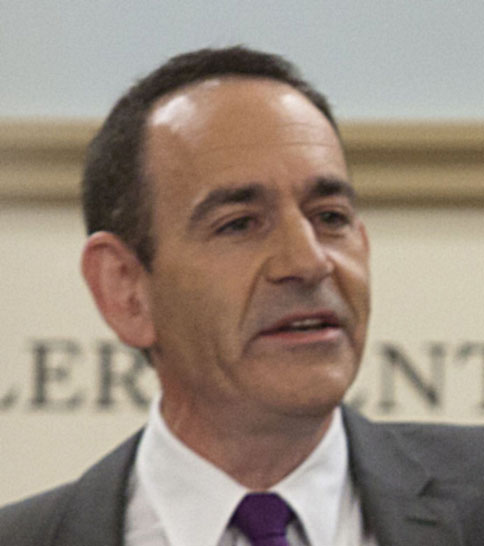
- Naftali in 2012
- Born: January 31, 1962 (age 64); Montreal, Quebec, Canada

Academic background
- Education: Yale University (BA); Johns Hopkins University (MA); Harvard University (PhD)
- Doctoral advisor: Akira Iriye; Ernest R. May

Academic work
- Institutions: University of Virginia; New America Foundation; New York University

Timothy Naftali (born January 31, 1962) is a Canadian American historian who is clinical associate professor of public service at New York University.

He has written four books, two of them co-authored with Alexander Fursenko on the Cuban Missile Crisis and Nikita Khrushchev.

He is a regular CNN contributor as a CNN presidential historian.

== Early life and education ==
Naftali was born in Montreal and at one point worked as an aide to Robert Bourassa. In 2007, he told the Toronto Star that he left Canada for the US in response to Quebec's language laws:

It seemed to me that the deck was stacked against civil liberties and I preferred to be in a country where I didn't have to worry about what language I spoke.

He earned his undergraduate degree from Yale, and later obtained graduate degrees from Johns Hopkins and Harvard.

== Career ==
Naftali's area of focus was the history of counterterrorism and the Cold War. Before becoming director of the Nixon Library in 2007, Naftali had been an associate professor at the University of Virginia, where he directed the Miller Center of Public Affairs' Presidential Recordings Program. In the 1990s, he taught at the University of Hawaii and Yale University.

He served as a consultant to the 9/11 Commission, which commissioned him to write an unclassified history of American counterterrorism policy. This was later expanded into his 2005 book Blind Spot: The Secret History of American Counterterrorism.

From 2007 to 2011, he directed the Richard Nixon Presidential Library and Museum. He was appointed when control of the Library was transferred from the Richard Nixon Foundation to the National Archives and Records Administration. His biggest task at the library was to present a more objective and unbiased picture of the Watergate scandal—a task completed in March 2011, when the Library's new Watergate gallery opened and received extensive news coverage. Naftali left the Nixon Library later that year.

== Personal life ==
Naftali is gay. He has said that he has faced discrimination for his sexual orientation in the past.

== Selected publications ==
- 1997: One Hell of a Gamble: Khrushchev, Castro, and Kennedy, 1958–1964 (with Aleksandr Fursenko): ISBN 0393040704
- 2001: John F. Kennedy: The Great Crises (edited with Philip D. Zelikow and Ernest R. May): ISBN 039304954X
- 2005: Blind Spot: The Secret History of American Counterterrorism: ISBN 0465092810
- 2006: Khrushchev's Cold War: The Inside Story of an American Adversary (with Aleksandr Fursenko), which won the Duke of Westminster's Medal for Military Literature: ISBN 0393058093
- 2007: George H. W. Bush: ISBN 9780805069662
- 2018: Impeachment: An American History
