= Mecham =

Mecham is a surname. Notable people with the surname include:

- Evan Mecham, Governor of Arizona 1987-1988
- George Mecham, British naval officer who participated in the search for Franklin's lost expedition
- Leonidas Ralph Mecham, Director of the Administrative Office of the United States Courts, 1985-2006
- William Mecham, British cartoonist and performer as Tom Merry (1853-1902)

== See also ==
- Mechem
- Meacham
