= Ellis K. Meacham =

American novelist

- Born: September 5, 1913
- Died: August 17, 1998 (aged 84)
- Education: University of Tennessee (Bachelor's); Vanderbilt University (Law degree)
- Occupations: Municipal judge, author
- Years active: 1937–1998
- Notable work: Napoleonic nautical trilogy
- Relatives: Jon Meacham

Ellis Kirby Meacham (September 5, 1913 – August 17, 1998) was an American attorney and judge who wrote three Napoleonic era nautical adventures, for which he was awarded the Friends of American Writers Major Award in Fiction in 1969. During World War II, he attained the rank of commander of the United States Navy Reserve. He raised his grandson, a Pulitzer Prize-winning historian, Jon Meacham, during a part of his childhood.

== Early life and education ==
Meacham was born in Chattanooga, Tennessee, the son of Jean (née Ellis) and Cowan White Kirby Meacham, an attorney of Glenwood, Chattanooga, Tennessee. His mother was involved in philanthropic and charitable efforts. His siblings are Alexander, Manning, and Jean Alice Meacham.`

He completed his high school education at Chattanooga High School and graduated from the University of Tennessee at Chattanooga with an A.B. in 1935 and Vanderbilt University with an LL.B. and the Founder's medal in 1937. He was a member of the Society of Lincoln's Inn, an honorary scholastic legal fraternity; the Delta Theta Phi, a legal fraternity; and the Sigma Chi fraternity.

== Career ==
Meacham was an attorney in Chattanooga from 1937 to 1941. He was a member of the Tennessee bar association and the Chattanooga Bar and Library association. In 1940, he worked at his father's law firm Cantell, Meacham & Moon. He served in the United States Navy Reserve during World War II, as a gunnery officer. He attained the rank of commander of the Naval Reserve Battalion 6-21 and of the training center. He returned to his law practice until 1972, when he became a judge in the Chattanooga Municipal Court.

Meacham wrote a Napoleonic nautical trilogy set in India. The hero of the books is Percival Merewether, an officer in the Honourable East India Company's private navy, known as the Bombay Marine. The set includes The East Indiaman (1968), On the Company’s Service (1971), and For King and Company (1976). He was awarded the Friends of American Writers Major Award in Fiction in 1969 for The East Indiaman. His wife, Jean, established the Meacham Writers' Workshop at the University of Tennessee named after him.

== Personal life ==
On February 12, 1940, he married Jean Bevan Austin, daughter of James Bevan Austin. She attended Agnes Scott College, where she was a member of the debate team and Chi Beta Sigma Phi, a national honorary fraternity. In her senior year, she was the president of the Pi Alpha Phi debating organization. She was a professor and later assistant dean at the University of Tennessee at Chattanooga, and the Executive Secretary of the Adult Education Council.

They had two sons, Kirby and Jere. Their son, Jere Ellis Meacham (1946–2008) attended The McCallie School and the University of Tennessee at Chattanooga. He was awarded for valor during the Vietnam War and was a construction and labor-relations executive. He married twice, the latter of which was to Pamela. With his first wife, Linda, he had a son, Jon Meacham, the editor of Newsweek and a Pulitzer Prize-winning historian. Jon lived with his grandparents, Ellis and Jean Meacham, after his parents' divorce.
