= Meacham syndrome =

- Other names: Double vagina, cardiac, pulmonary, and other genital malformations with 46,XY karyotype, Meacham Winn Culler syndrome
- Specialty: Medical genetics, Pediatry
- Symptoms: Affecting the lungs, kidneys, and genitalia.
- Complications: Respiratory arrest
- Usual onset: Birth
- Duration: Not applicable
- Causes: Genetic mutation
- Prognosis: Poor to Medium
- Frequency: Rare, only 12 cases have been reported

Meacham syndrome is a rare genetic disorder which is characterized by lung, diaphragmatic and genitourinary anomalies.

== Signs and symptoms ==
Often people with this condition are born with both underdeveloped lungs and a herniated diaphragm.

Urinary symptoms include a horseshoe kidney

Genital symptoms are different according to the biological sex of the baby, genetic males (46,XY) usually have pseudohermaphroditism, ambiguous genitalia, and perineal hypospadias. Genetic females (46,XX) often have septate uterus and duplication of the vagina. In some cases, karyotype is needed to know the biological sex of the baby.

Additional symptoms include neoplasm, cryptorchidism, ventricular septal defect, atrial septal defect, hernia, patent ductus arteriosus, Tetralogy of Fallot, and penile hypoplasia.

== Causes ==
This condition is caused by an autosomal dominant missense mutation in the WT1 gene, in chromosome 11. This was found through two half-siblings reported by Suri et al.

== Epidemiology ==
According to OMIM, only 12 cases have been described in medical literature.
