= Shirley Meacham =

American politician

Shirley Meacham (April 17, 1927 – December 11, 2010) was an American nurse and politician.

Shirley Terry was born in Helena, Arkansas, to parents Lee and Edith Terry. The family moved to Clarendon, where she graduated high school. She later attended Memphis State University and served in Memphis, Tennessee, with the Volunteer Nursing Corps. Terry married Kirby Meacham Sr. in 1947, and soon moved to Monroe, Arkansas. The Arkansas Digital Archives have photos of her and a campaign card. She was elected to office after the death of her husband, who served in the Arkansas House from 1967 to 1974, succeeding him in office. She served in the Arkansas House for 17 years.
