= Richard W. Leopold Prize =

The Richard W. Leopold Prize is awarded biennially by the Organization of American Historians (OAH). Professor Richard W. Leopold (1912–2006) was President of the OAH in 1976–1977.

A three-member committee, chosen by the President of the OAH, chooses the best history book on U.S. federal government agencies, U.S. foreign policies, U.S. military affairs, or biographies of government officials. Only non-academic historians are eligible for the Prize, preferably historians employed by federal government agencies. The winning author receives $1,500. In 1990, the prize went to two books. In 2002, the prize went to two books, one of which had two authors. In these years, the authors split the prize money.

In the listing below, the author links lead to the latest available biographical data. Unfortunately, few government employees have sites comparable to those sites in academia. The institutional affiliation listed is that at the time the awards was given, and the links are to those institutions. In both cases, “Wikipedia” sites, where available, were given preference.

== Recipients ==
Year	Winner	Affiliation	Title
1984	J. Merton England		A Patron for Pure Science, The National Science Foundation's Formative Years, 1945-1957
1986	Steven L. Rearden		History of the Office of the Secretary of Defense: The Formative Years, 1947-1950
1988	James Edward Miller		The United States and Italy 1940-1950: The Politics and Diplomacy of Stabilization
1990	Richard G. Hewlett co-author	U.S. Department of Energy	Atoms for Peace and War 1953-1961: Eisenhower and the Atomic Energy Commission
1990	Jack M. Holl co-author	U.S. Department of Energy	Atoms for Peace and War 1953-1961: Eisenhower and the Atomic Energy Commission
1992	Donald A. Ritchie	U.S. Senate	Press Gallery: Congress and the Washington Correspondents
1994	Donald R. Baucom	Air Power Research Institute at Maxwell Air Force Base, Alabama	The Origins of SDI, 1944-1983
1996	Barton C. Hacker	U.S. Department of Energy	Elements of Controversy: The Atomic Energy Commission and Radiation Safety in Nuclear Weapons Testing, 1947-1974
1998	Andrew J. Butrica	Independent scholar	To See the Unseen: A History of Planetary Radar Astronomy
2000	William M. Hammond	U.S. Army Center of Military History	Reporting Vietnam: Media and Military at War
2002co-winner	Dale Andradé co-author	U.S. Army Center of Military History	Indonesia, Spies and Commandos: How America Lost the Secret War in North Vietnam
2002co-winner	Kenneth Conboy, co-author	Control Risks Group	Indonesia, Spies and Commandos: How America Lost the Secret War in North Vietnam
2002co-winner	Gary E. Weir	U.S. Naval Historical Center	An Ocean in Common: American Naval Officers, Scientists, and the Ocean
2004	Peter S. Kindsvatter	U.S. Army Ordnance Center and Schools, Aberdeen Proving Grounds	American Soldiers: Ground Combat in the World Wars, Korea, and Vietnam
2006	Robert J. Schneller Jr.	U.S. Naval Historical Center	Breaking the Color Barrier: The U.S. Naval Academy's First Black Midshipmen and the Struggle for Racial Equality
2008	Michael J. Neufeld	National Air and Space Museum, Smithsonian Institution	Von Braun: Dreamer of Space, Engineer of War
2010	J. Samuel Walker	U.S. Nuclear Regulatory Commission	The Road to Yucca Mountain: The Development of Radioactive Waste Policy in the United States
2012	William A. Dobak	The United States Army Center of Military History (retired)	Freedom by the Sword: The U.S. Colored Troops, 1862–1867
2014	Sarah C. Paine	US Naval War College	The Wars for Asia, 1911–1949
2016	Jacqueline E. Whitt	Air War College	Bringing God to Men: American Military Chaplains and the Vietnam War
2018	Richard S. Faulkner	U.S. Army Command and General Staff College	Pershing’s Crusaders: The American Soldier in World War I
2020	Anand Toprani	U.S. Naval War College	Oil and the Great Powers: Britain and Germany, 1914–1945
2022	Christian Friedrich Ostermann	Woodrow Wilson Center	Between Containment and Rollback: The United States and the Cold War in Germany
2024	John H. Sprinkle Jr.	University of Maryland	Heritage Conservation in the United States: Enhancing the Presence of the Past
2026	Thomas M. Jamison	Naval Postgraduate School	The Pacific’s New Navies: An Ocean, Its Wars, and the Making of U.S. Sea Power

== See also ==
- List of history awards
