= United States Senate =

Upper house of the US Congress

Coordinates: 38°53′26″N 77°0′32″W

- 119th United States Congress
- Seal of the U.S. Senate

- Flag of the U.S. Senate

Type
- Type: Upper house of the United States Congress
- Term limits: None

History
- New session started: January 3, 2025

Leadership
- President: JD Vance (R) since January 20, 2025
- President pro tempore: Chuck Grassley (R) since January 3, 2025
- Majority Leader: John Thune (R) since January 3, 2025
- Minority Leader: Chuck Schumer (D) since January 3, 2025
- Majority Whip: John Barrasso (R) since January 3, 2025
- Minority Whip: Dick Durbin (D) since January 3, 2025

Structure
- Seats: 100
- Political groups: Majority (53): Republican (53); Minority (47): Democratic (45); Independent (2) (Note: Independent Sens. Angus King (Maine) and Bernie Sanders (Vermont) caucus with the Democratic Party.)
- Length of term: 6 years

Elections
- Voting system: Plurality voting in 46 states (Note: Alaska (for its primary elections only), California, and Washington additionally utilize a nonpartisan blanket primary, and Mississippi uses the two-round system, for their respective primary elections.) Varies in 4 states: Alaska & Maine: Instant-runoff voting; Georgia & Louisiana: Two-round system
- Last election: November 3, 2026 (35 seats)
- Next election: November 7, 2028 (34 seats)

Meeting place
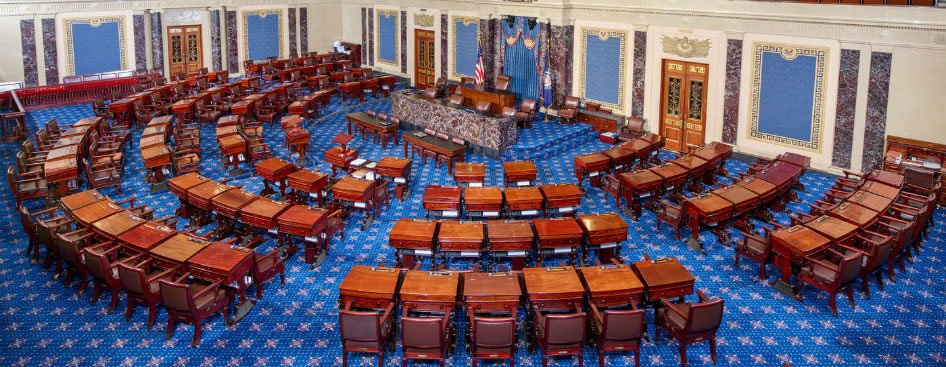
- Senate Chamber; United States Capitol; Washington, D.C. United States

Website
- senate.gov

Constitution
- United States Constitution

Rules
- Standing Rules of the United States Senate

The United States Senate is a chamber of the bicameral United States Congress; it is the upper house, and the U.S. House of Representatives is the lower house. Together, the Senate and House have the authority under Article One of the Constitution to make and pass or defeat federal legislation.

The Senate has exclusive power to confirm U.S. presidential appointments, to approve or reject treaties, and to convict or exonerate impeachment cases brought by the House. The Senate and the House provide a check and balance on the powers of the executive and judicial branches of government. The composition and powers of the Senate are established by Article One of the U.S. Constitution, which has been in effect since March 4, 1789. Each of the 50 states is represented by two senators who serve staggered six-year terms, for a total of 100 members.

From the Senate's inception in 1789 until 1913, senators were appointed by the state legislatures of their respective states. Since 1913, however, following ratification of the Seventeenth Amendment, senators have been elected by statewide popular vote. The Senate has several powers of advice and consent. These include the approval of treaties, the confirmation of Cabinet secretaries, federal judges (including justices of the Supreme Court), flag officers, regulatory officials, ambassadors, other federal executive officials, and federal uniformed officers. If no candidate receives a majority of electors for vice president, the duty falls to the Senate to elect one of the top two recipients of electors to that office. The Senate conducts trials of officials who have been impeached by the House. The Senate has been considered both a more deliberative and prestigious body than the House of Representatives due to its longer terms, smaller size, and statewide constituencies, which historically led to a more collegial and less partisan atmosphere.

The Senate chamber is located in the north wing of the Capitol Building in Washington, D.C., the nation's capital. While not themselves a senator, the vice president of the United States serves as ex officio presiding officer and president of the Senate; they vote only if and when the Senate is equally divided. In the vice president's absence, the president pro tempore, who is traditionally the most senior member of the Senate majority party, presides over the Senate, and more often by rule allows a junior senator to take the chair, guided by the parliamentarian. In the early 1920s, the practice of majority and minority parties electing their floor leaders began. The Senate's legislative and executive business is managed and scheduled by the Senate majority leader, who, on occasion, negotiates some matters with the Senate minority leader. A characteristic practice in the Senate is the filibuster on some matters and its remedy, the vote on cloture.

== History ==
The drafters of the Constitution debated more about how to award representation in the Senate than about any other part of the Constitution. While bicameralism and the idea of a proportional (Note: Not to be confused with proportional representation, an electoral system that typically elects multiple members of a party to a legislature based on that party's percentage of a popular vote.) "people's house" were widely popular, discussions about Senate representation proved contentious. In the end, some small states—unwilling to give up their equal power with larger states under the Articles of Confederation—threatened to secede in 1787, and won the day by a vote of 5–4 in what became known as the Connecticut Compromise. The Connecticut Compromise provided, among other things, that each state—regardless of population—would be represented by two senators.

First convened in 1789, the Senate of the United States was formed on the example of the ancient Roman Senate. The name is derived from the senatus, Latin for council of elders, derived from senex, meaning old man in Latin. Article Five of the Constitution stipulates that no constitutional amendment may be created to deprive a state of its equal suffrage in the Senate without that state's consent. The United States has had 50 states since 1959, thus the Senate has had 100 senators since 1959.

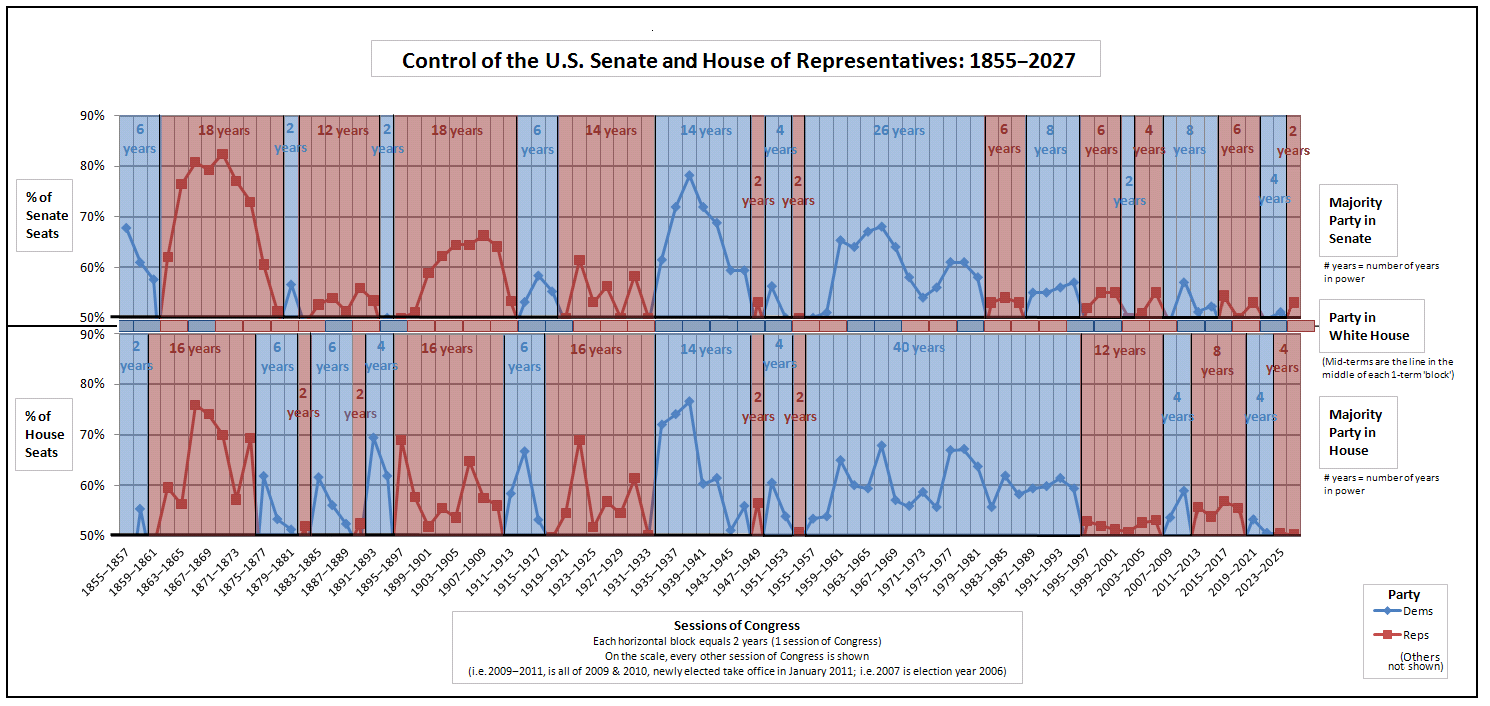
A graph of party control of the U.S. Senate, U.S. House of Representatives, and the Presidency since 1855

Before the adoption of the Seventeenth Amendment in 1913, senators were elected by the individual state legislatures. Problems with repeated vacant seats due to the inability of a legislature to elect senators, intrastate political struggles, bribery and intimidation gradually led to a growing movement to amend the Constitution to allow for the direct election of senators.

In contrast to the House of Representatives, the Senate has historically had stronger norms of conduct for its members.

== Functions ==
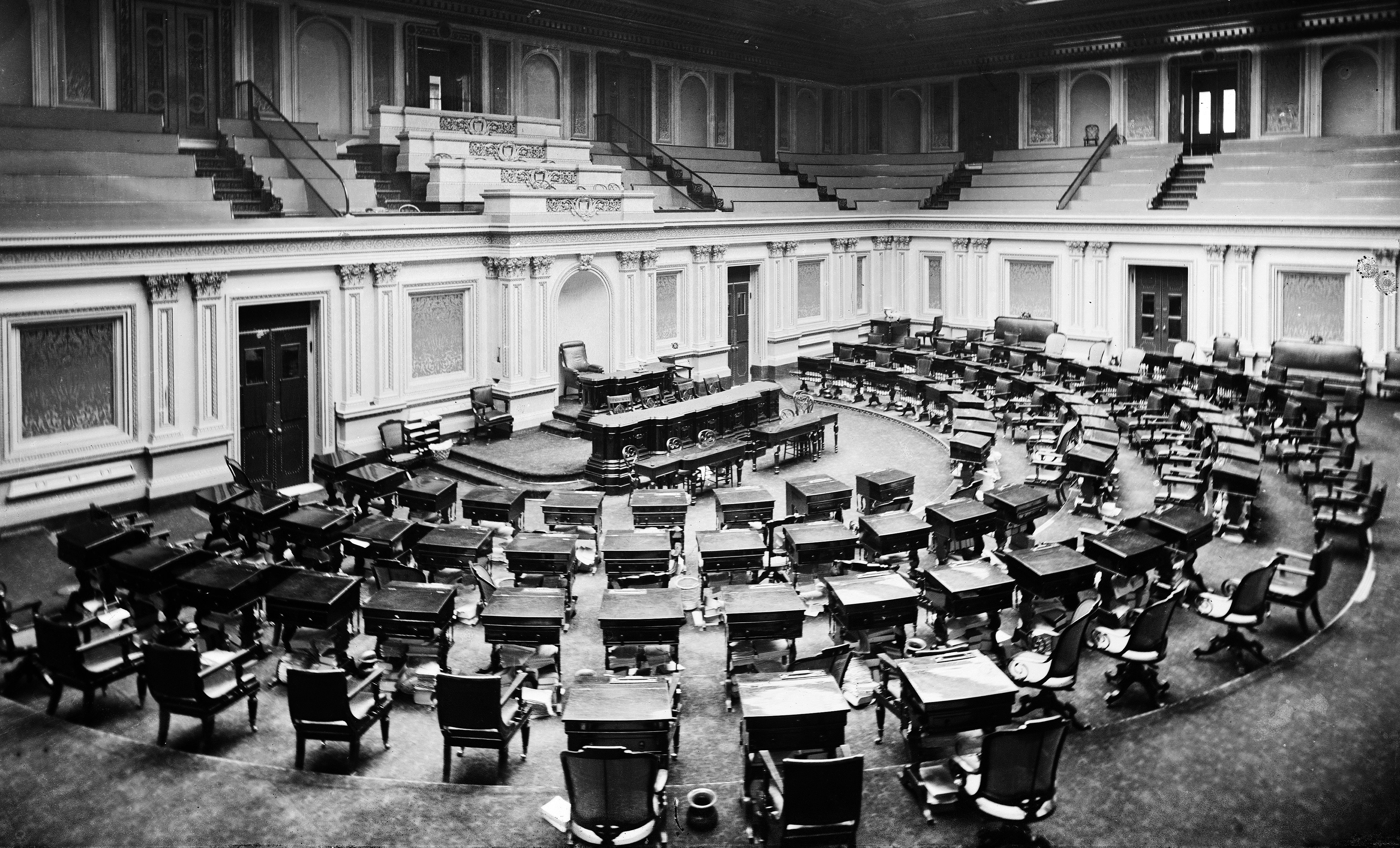
The U.S. Senate chamber, c. 1873; two or three spittoons are visible by desks.

Senate approval is required to pass any federal legislation. The Constitution provides several unique functions for the Senate that form its ability to "checks and balances" the powers of other elements of the federal government. These include the requirement that the Senate may advise and must consent to some of the president's government appointments; also, the Senate must consent to all treaties with foreign governments; it tries all impeachments, and it elects the vice president in the event no person gets a majority of the electoral votes.

=== Legislation ===
Bills may be introduced in either chamber of Congress. However, the Constitution's Origination Clause provides that "All bills for raising Revenue shall originate in the House of Representatives". As a result, the Senate does not have the power to initiate bills imposing taxes. Furthermore, the House of Representatives holds that the Senate does not have the power to originate appropriation bills, or bills authorizing the expenditure of federal funds.

Historically, the Senate has disputed the interpretation advocated by the House. However, when the Senate originates an appropriations bill, the House simply refuses to consider it, thereby settling the dispute in practice. The constitutional provision barring the Senate from introducing revenue bills is based on the practice of the Parliament of the United Kingdom, in which money bills approved by Parliament have originated in the House of Commons per constitutional convention.

Although the Constitution gave the House the power to initiate revenue bills, in practice the Senate is equal to the House in the respect of spending. As Woodrow Wilson wrote:

The Senate's right to amend general appropriation bills has been allowed the widest possible scope. The upper house may add to them what it pleases; may go altogether outside of their original provisions and tack to them entirely new features of legislation, altering not only the amounts but even the objects of expenditure, and making out of the materials sent them by the popular chamber measures of an almost totally new character.

The approval of both houses is required for any bill, including a revenue bill, to become law. Both Houses must pass the same version of the bill; if there are differences, they may be resolved by sending amendments back and forth or by a conference committee, which includes members of both bodies.

=== Appointment confirmations ===
The president can make certain appointments only with the advice and consent of the Senate. Officials whose appointments require the Senate's approval include members of the Cabinet, heads of most federal executive agencies, ambassadors, justices of the Supreme Court, and other federal judges. Under Article II, Section 2, of the Constitution, a large number of government appointments are subject to potential confirmation; however, Congress has passed legislation to authorize the appointment of many officials without the Senate's consent. Usually, confirmation requirements are reserved for those officials with the most significant final decision-making authority.

Typically, a nominee is the first subject to a hearing before a Senate committee. Thereafter, the nomination is considered by the full Senate. The majority of nominees are confirmed; however, in a small number of cases each year, Senate committees purposely fail to act on a nomination to block it. In addition, the president sometimes withdraws nominations when they appear unlikely to be confirmed. Because of this, outright rejections of nominees on the Senate floor are infrequent. There have been only nine Cabinet nominees rejected outright in United States history.

The powers of the Senate concerning nominations are subject to some constraints. For instance, the Constitution provides that the president may make an appointment during a congressional recess without the Senate's advice and consent. The recess appointment remains valid only temporarily. The office becomes vacant again at the end of the next congressional session. Nevertheless, presidents have frequently used recess appointments to circumvent the possibility that the Senate may reject the nominee. Furthermore, as the Supreme Court held in Myers v. United States, although the Senate's advice and consent are required for the appointment of certain executive branch officials, it is not necessary for their removal. Recess appointments have faced a significant amount of resistance. In 1960, the U.S. Senate passed a legally non-binding resolution against recess appointments to the Supreme Court.

=== Treaty ratification ===
The Senate also has a role in ratifying treaties. The Constitution provides that the president may only "make Treaties, provided two-thirds of the senators present concur" in order to benefit from the Senate's advice and consent and give each state an equal vote in the process. However, not all international agreements are considered treaties under U.S. domestic law, even if they are considered treaties under international law. Congress has passed laws authorizing the president to conclude executive agreements without action by the Senate. Similarly, the president may make congressional-executive agreements with the approval of a simple majority in each House of Congress, rather than a two-thirds majority in the Senate. Neither executive agreements nor congressional-executive agreements are mentioned in the Constitution, leading some scholars such as Laurence Tribe and John Yoo to suggest that they unconstitutionally circumvent the treaty-ratification process. However, courts have upheld the validity of such agreements.

=== Impeachment trials ===
The Constitution empowers the House of Representatives to impeach federal officials for "Treason, Bribery, or other high Crimes and Misdemeanors" and empowers the Senate to try such impeachments. If the sitting president of the United States is being tried, the chief justice of the United States presides over the trial. During an impeachment trial, senators are constitutionally required to sit on oath or affirmation.

Conviction requires a two-thirds majority of the senators present. A convicted official is automatically removed from office; in addition, the Senate may stipulate that the defendant be banned from holding office. No further punishment is permitted during the impeachment proceedings; however, the party may face criminal penalties in a normal court of law.

The House of Representatives has impeached sixteen officials, of whom seven were convicted. One resigned before the Senate could complete the trial. Only three presidents have been impeached: Andrew Johnson in 1868, Bill Clinton in 1998, and Donald Trump in 2019 and 2021. The trials of Johnson, Clinton and both Trump trials ended in acquittal; in Johnson's case, the Senate fell one vote short of the two-thirds majority required for conviction.

=== Election of the vice president ===
Under the Twelfth Amendment, the Senate has the power to elect the vice president if no vice-presidential candidate receives a majority of votes in the Electoral College. The Twelfth Amendment requires the Senate to choose from the two candidates with the highest numbers of electoral votes. Electoral College deadlocks are rare. The Senate has only broken a deadlock once; in 1837, it elected Richard Mentor Johnson.

== Membership ==
Members of the United States Senate by class from the staggered term system for the 119th United States Congress

Though the age difference between incoming and departing senators in 2027 was nearly 15 years, the overall average age—far above the age 30 minimum—declined less than a year because of the aging of those continuing their terms.

=== Qualifications ===
Article I, Section 3, of the Constitution, sets three qualifications for senators: (1) they must be at least 30 years old; (2) they must have been citizens of the United States for at least nine years; and (3) they must be inhabitants of the states they seek to represent at the time of their election. The age and citizenship qualifications for senators are more stringent than those for representatives. In Federalist No. 62, James Madison justified this arrangement by arguing that the "senatorial trust" called for a "greater extent of information and stability of character":

A senator must be thirty years of age at least; as a representative must be twenty-five. And the former must have been a citizen nine years; as seven years are required for the latter. The propriety of these distinctions is explained by the nature of the senatorial trust, which, requiring greater extent of information and stability of character, requires at the same time that the senator should have reached a period of life most likely to supply these advantages; and which, participating immediately in transactions with foreign nations, ought to be exercised by none who are not thoroughly weaned from the prepossessions and habits incident to foreign birth and education. The term of nine years appears to be a prudent mediocrity between a total exclusion of adopted citizens, whose merits and talents may claim a share in the public confidence, and an indiscriminate and hasty admission of them, which might create a channel for foreign influence on the national councils.

The Senate, not the judiciary, is the sole judge of a senator's qualifications. During its early years the Senate did not closely scrutinize the qualifications of its members. As a result, four senators who failed to meet the age requirement were admitted to the Senate: Henry Clay (aged 29 in 1806), John Jordan Crittenden (aged 29 in 1817), Armistead Thomson Mason (aged 28 in 1816), and John Eaton (aged 28 in 1818). Such an occurrence has not been repeated since.

In 1934, Rush D. Holt Sr. was elected to the Senate at the age of 29. He waited until he turned 30, on the next June 19, to take the oath of office. On November 7, 1972, Joe Biden was elected to the Senate at the age of 29, which was only 13 days prior to his 30th birthday on November 20, 1972. Therefore, he reached his 30th birthday before the swearing-in ceremony for incoming senators in January 1973.

The Fourteenth Amendment to the United States Constitution disqualifies as senators any federal or state officers who had taken the requisite oath to support the Constitution, but who later engaged in rebellion or aided the enemies of the United States. This provision, which came into force soon after the end of the Civil War, was intended to prevent those who had sided with the Confederacy from serving. That Amendment also provides a method to remove that disqualification: a two-thirds vote of both chambers of Congress.

=== Elections and term ===
Originally, senators were selected by the state legislatures, not by popular elections. By the early years of the 20th century, the legislatures of as many as 29 states had provided for popular election of senators by referendums. In 1913, popular election to the Senate was standardized nationally by the ratification of the Seventeenth Amendment.

==== Elections ====
Elections to the Senate are held on the first Tuesday after the first Monday in November in even-numbered years, Election Day, and occur simultaneously with elections for the House of Representatives. Senators are elected by their state as a whole. The Elections Clause of the United States Constitution grants each state (and Congress, if it so desires to implement a uniform law) the power to legislate a method by which senators are elected. Ballot access rules for independent and minor party candidates vary from state to state.

In 45 states, a primary election is held first for the Republican and Democratic parties, and a select few third parties, depending on the state, with the general election following a few months later. In most of these states, the nominee may receive only a plurality. In some states, a runoff is required if no majority was achieved. In the general election, the winner is the candidate who receives a plurality of the popular vote.

In five states, different methods are used. In Georgia, a runoff between the top two candidates occurs if the plurality winner in the general election does not also win a majority. In the states of California and Washington, a nonpartisan blanket primary, also known as a "jungle primary" or "top-two primary", is held in which all candidates participate in a single primary regardless of party affiliation. The top two candidates in terms of votes received at the primary election advance to the general election, where the winner is the candidate with the greater number of votes. In Maine and Alaska, ranked-choice voting is used to nominate and elect candidates for federal offices, including the Senate.

==== Vacancies ====
The Seventeenth Amendment requires that vacancies in the Senate be filled by special election. Whenever a senator must be appointed or elected, the secretary of the Senate mails one of three forms to the state's governor to inform them of the proper wording to certify the appointment of a new senator. If a special election for one seat happens to coincide with a general election for the state's other seat, each seat is contested separately. A senator elected in a special election takes office as soon as possible after the election and serves until the original six-year term expires (i.e. not for a full-term).

The Seventeenth Amendment permits state legislatures to empower their governors to make temporary appointments until the required special election takes place.

The manner by which the Seventeenth Amendment is enacted varies among the states. A 2018 report broke this down into the following three broad categories. Specific procedures vary among the states, and they have changed since the publication of the 2018 report:

- Four states – Kentucky, North Dakota, Rhode Island, and Wisconsin – do not empower their governors to make temporary appointments, relying exclusively on the required special election provision in the Seventeenth Amendment.
- Nine states – Alaska, Connecticut, Louisiana, Massachusetts, Mississippi, Oregon, Texas, Vermont, and Washington – provide for gubernatorial appointments, and require a special election on an accelerated schedule.
- The remaining thirty-seven states provide for gubernatorial appointments, "with the appointed senator serving the balance of the term or until the next statewide general election".

In 11 states within the final category above – Arizona, Hawaii, Kansas, Maryland, Montana, Nevada, North Carolina, Oklahoma, Utah, West Virginia, and Wyoming – the governor must appoint someone of the same political party as the previous incumbent.

In September 2009, Massachusetts changed its law to enable the governor to appoint a temporary replacement for the late senator Edward Kennedy until the special election in January 2010.

In 2004, Alaska enacted legislation and a separate ballot referendum that took effect on the same day, but that conflicted with each other. The effect of the ballot-approved law is to withhold from the governor authority to appoint a senator. Because the 17th Amendment vests the power to grant that authority to the legislature – not the people or the state generally – it is unclear whether the ballot measure supplants the legislature's statute granting that authority. As a result, it is uncertain whether an Alaska governor may appoint an interim senator to serve until a special election is held to fill the vacancy.

In 2021, Oklahoma permitted its governor again to appoint a successor who is of the same party as the previous senator for at least the preceding five years when the vacancy arises in an even-numbered year, only after the appointee has taken an oath not to run in either a regular or special Senate election. In 2025, Oregon reinstated the gubernatorial power to appoint a successor also of the same party as the senator who vacates the seat, but disallows the governor to appoint oneself to the Senate. However, a special election must be called within several weeks or a few months of the vacancy.

==== Term ====
Senators serve terms of six years each. The terms are staggered so that approximately one-third of the seats are up for election every two years. This was achieved by dividing the senators of the 1st Congress into thirds, called classes, where the terms of one-third expired after two years, the terms of another third expired after four, and the terms of the last third expired after six years. This arrangement was also followed after the admission of new states into the union.

The staggering of terms has been arranged so both seats from a given state are not contested in the same general election, except when a vacancy is being filled. Class II comprises senators whose six-year terms are set to expire on January 3, 2027. There is no constitutional limit to the number of terms a senator may serve.

The Constitution set the date for Congress to convene — Article 1, Section 4, Clause 2, originally set that date for the third day of December. The Twentieth Amendment changed the opening date for sessions to noon on the third day of January, unless they shall by law appoint a different day. The Twentieth Amendment also states that the Congress shall assemble at least once every year, and allows the Congress to determine its convening and adjournment dates and other dates and schedules as it desires. Article 1, Section 3, provides that the president has the power to convene Congress on extraordinary occasions at his discretion.

A member who has been elected, but not yet seated, is called a senator-elect. A member who has been appointed to a seat, but not yet seated, is called a senator-designate.

=== Oath ===
The Constitution requires that senators take an oath or affirmation to support the Constitution. Congress has prescribed the following oath for all federal officials (except the President), including senators:

I, ___ ___, do solemnly swear (or affirm) that I will support and defend the Constitution of the United States against all enemies, foreign and domestic; that I will bear true faith and allegiance to the same; that I take this obligation freely, without any mental reservation or purpose of evasion; and that I will well and faithfully discharge the duties of the office on which I am about to enter. So help me God.

=== Salary and benefits ===
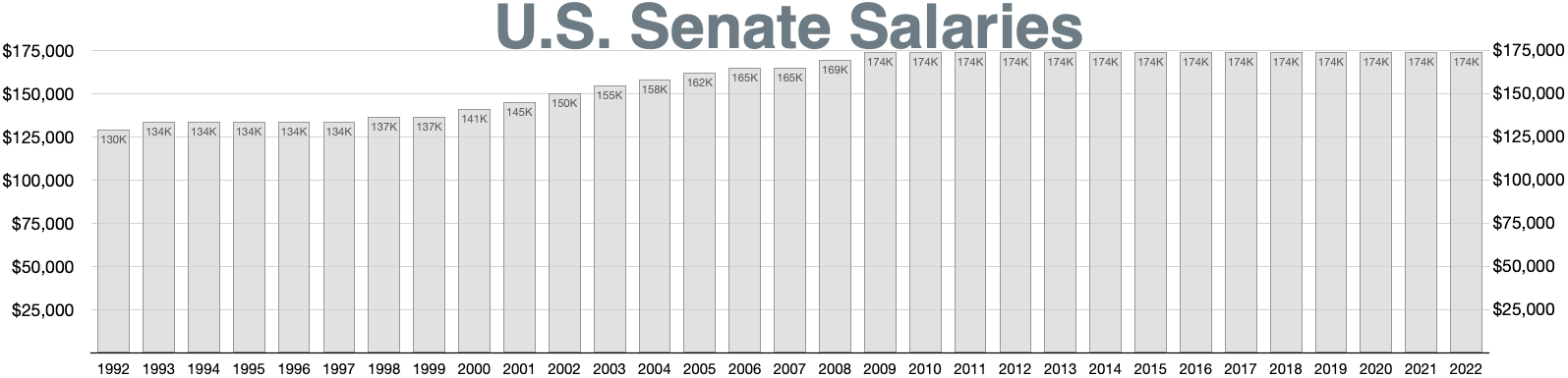
U.S. Senate salaries, 1992–2022

The annual salary of each senator, since 2009, is $174,000; the president pro tempore and party leaders receive $193,400. In 2003, at least 40 senators were millionaires; by 2018, over 50 senators were millionaires, partly due to inflation.

Along with earning salaries, senators receive retirement and health benefits that are identical to other federal employees, and are fully vested after five years of service. Senators are covered by the Federal Employees Retirement System (FERS) or Civil Service Retirement System (CSRS). FERS has been the Senate's retirement system since January 1, 1987, while CSRS applies only for those senators who were in the Senate from December 31, 1986, and prior. As it is for federal employees, congressional retirement is funded through taxes and the participants' contributions.

Under FERS, senators contribute 1.3% of their salary into the FERS retirement plan and pay 6.2% of their salary in Social Security taxes. The amount of a senator's pension depends on the years of service and the average of the highest three years of their salary. The starting amount of a senator's retirement annuity may not exceed 80% of their final salary. In 2006, the average annual pension for retired senators and representatives under CSRS was $60,972, while those who retired under FERS, or in combination with CSRS, was $35,952.

=== Seniority ===
By tradition, seniority is a factor in the selection of physical offices and in party caucuses' assignment of committees. When senators have been in office for the same length of time, a number of tiebreakers are used, including comparing their former government service and then their respective state population.

The senator in each state with the longer time in office is known as the senior senator, while the other is the junior senator. For example, minority leader Chuck Schumer is the senior senator from New York, having served in the senate since 1999, while Kirsten Gillibrand is New York's junior senator, having served since 2009.

=== Titles ===
Like members of the House of Representatives, senators use the prefix "The Honorable" before their names. Senators are usually identified in the media and other sources by party and state; for example, Democratic majority leader Chuck Schumer, who represents New York, may be identified as "D–New York" or (D-NY). And sometimes they are identified as to whether they are the junior or senior senator in their state (see above). Unless in the context of elections, they are rarely identified by which one of the three classes of senators they are in.

=== Expulsion and other disciplinary actions ===
The Senate may expel a senator by a two-thirds vote. Fifteen senators have been expelled in the Senate's history: William Blount, for treason, in 1797, and fourteen in 1861 and 1862 for supporting the Confederate secession. Although no senator has been expelled since 1862, many senators have chosen to resign when faced with expulsion proceedings – for example, Bob Packwood in 1995. The Senate has also censured and condemned senators; censure requires only a simple majority and does not remove a senator from office. Some senators have opted to withdraw from their re-election races rather than face certain censure or expulsion, such as Robert Torricelli in 2002.

== Majority and minority parties ==
The "majority party" is the political party that either has a majority of seats or can form a coalition or caucus with a majority of seats; if two or more parties are tied, the vice president's affiliation determines which party is the majority party. The next-largest party is known as the minority party. The president pro tempore, committee chairs, and some other officials are generally from the majority party; they have counterparts (for instance, the "ranking members" of committees) in the minority party. Independents and members of third parties (so long as they do not caucus support either of the larger parties) are not considered in determining which is the majority party.

=== Seating ===
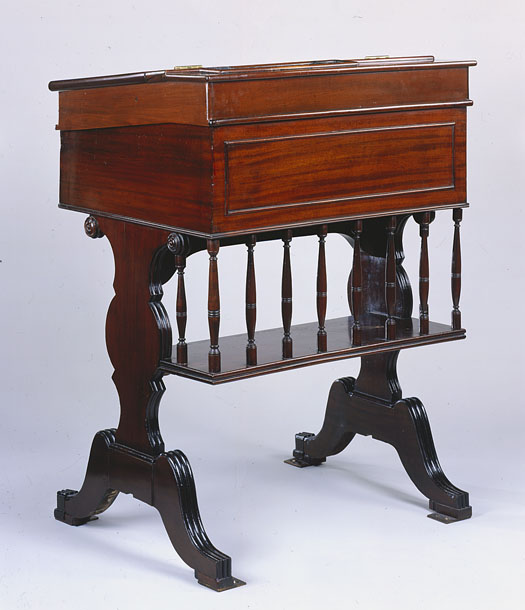
A typical Senate desk on the floor of the United States Senate

One hundred desks are arranged in the chamber in a semicircular pattern and are divided by a wide central aisle. The Democratic Party traditionally sits to the presiding officer's right, and the Republican Party traditionally sits to the presiding officer's left, regardless of which party has a majority of seats.

Each senator chooses a desk based on seniority within the party. By custom, the leader of each party sits in the front row along the center aisle. Forty-eight of the desks date back to 1819, when the Senate chamber was reconstructed after the original contents were destroyed in the 1812 Burning of Washington. Further desks of similar design were added as new states entered the Union. It is a tradition that each senator who uses a desk inscribes their name on the inside of the desk's drawer with a pen.

== Officers ==
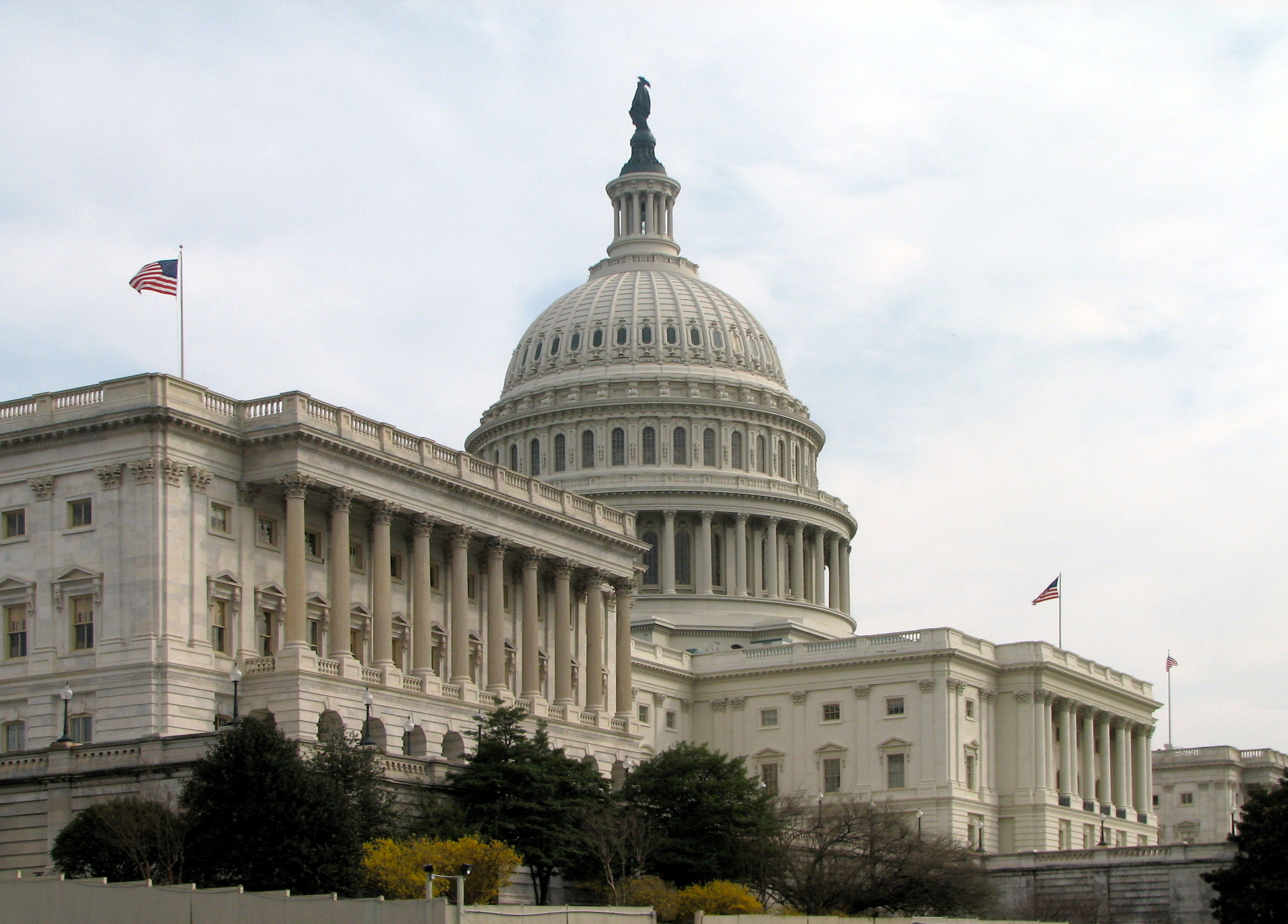
The Senate side of the United States Capitol in Washington, D.C.

Except for the president of the Senate (who is the vice president), the Senate elects its own officers, who maintain order and decorum, manage and schedule the legislative and executive business of the Senate, and interpret the Senate's rules, practices and precedents. Many non-member officers are also hired to run various day-to-day functions of the Senate.

=== Presiding officer ===
Under the Constitution, the vice president serves as president of the Senate. They may vote in the Senate (ex officio, for they are not an elected member of the Senate) in the case of a tie, but are not required to. For much of the nation's history the task of presiding over Senate sessions was one of the vice president's principal duties (the other being to receive from the states the tally of electoral ballots cast for president and vice president and to open the certificates "in the Presence of the Senate and House of Representatives", so that the total votes could be counted). Since the 1950s, vice presidents have presided over few Senate debates. Instead, they have usually presided only on ceremonial occasions, such as swearing in new senators, joint sessions, or at times to announce the result of significant legislation or nomination, or when a tie vote on an important issue is anticipated.

The Constitution authorizes the Senate to elect a president pro tempore (Latin for "president for a time"), who presides over the chamber in the vice president's absence and is, by custom, the senator of the majority party with the longest record of continuous service. Like the vice president, the president pro tempore does not normally preside over the Senate, but typically delegates the responsibility of presiding to a majority-party senator who presides over the Senate, usually in blocks of one hour on a rotating basis. Frequently, freshmen senators (newly elected members) are asked to preside so that they may become accustomed to the rules and procedures of the body. It is said that, "in practice they are usually mere mouthpieces for the Senate's parliamentarian, who whispers what they should do".

The presiding officer sits in a chair in the front of the Senate chamber. The powers of the presiding officer of the Senate are far less extensive than those of the speaker of the House. The presiding officer calls on senators to speak (by the rules of the Senate, the first senator who rises is recognized); ruling on points of order (objections by senators that a rule has been breached, subject to appeal to the whole chamber); and announcing the results of votes.

=== Party leaders ===
Each party elects Senate party leaders. Floor leaders act as the party chief spokesmen. The Senate majority leader is responsible for controlling the agenda of the chamber by scheduling debates and votes. Each party elects an assistant leader (whip), who works to ensure that his party's senators vote as the party leadership desires.

=== Non-member officers ===
In addition to the vice president, the Senate has several officers who are not members. The Senate's chief administrative officer is the secretary of the Senate, who maintains public records, disburses salaries, monitors the acquisition of stationery and supplies, and oversees clerks. The assistant secretary of the Senate aids the secretary's work. Party secretaries provide legislative and administrative support to their party leader and caucus. Another official is the sergeant at arms who, as the Senate's chief law enforcement officer, maintains order and security on the Senate premises. The Capitol Police handle routine police work, with the sergeant at arms primarily responsible for general oversight. Other employees include the chaplain, who is elected by the Senate, and pages, who are appointed.

== Procedure ==
=== Daily sessions ===
The Senate uses Standing Rules for operation. Like the House of Representatives, the Senate meets in the United States Capitol in Washington, D.C. At one end of the chamber of the Senate is a dais from which the presiding officer presides. The lower tier of the dais is used by clerks and other officials. Sessions of the Senate are opened with a special prayer or invocation and typically convene on weekdays. Sessions of the Senate are generally open to the public and are broadcast live on television, usually by C-SPAN 2.

Senate procedure depends on the rules, and a variety of customs and traditions. The Senate commonly waives some of its stricter rules by unanimous consent. Unanimous consent agreements are typically negotiated beforehand by party leaders. A senator may block such an agreement, but in practice, objections are rare. The presiding officer enforces the rules of the Senate, and may warn members who deviate from them. The presiding officer sometimes uses the gavel of the Senate to maintain order.

A "hold" is placed when the leader's office is notified that a senator intends to object to a request for unanimous consent from the Senate to consider or pass a measure. A hold may be placed for any reason and can be lifted by the senator who placed it at any time. A senator may place a hold simply to review a bill, to negotiate changes to the bill, or to kill the bill. A bill can be held for as long as the senator who objects to the bill wishes to block its consideration.

Holds can be overcome, but require time-consuming procedures such as filing cloture. Holds are considered private communications between a senator and the leader, and are sometimes referred to as "secret holds". A senator may disclose the placement of a hold.

The Constitution provides that a majority of the Senate constitutes a quorum to do business. Under the rules and customs of the Senate, a quorum is always assumed as present unless a quorum call explicitly demonstrates otherwise. A senator may request a quorum call by "suggesting the absence of a quorum". A clerk then calls the roll and notes which members are present. In practice, senators rarely request quorum calls to establish the quorum as present. Instead, quorum calls are generally used to temporarily delay proceedings. Usually, such delays are used while waiting for a senator to reach the floor to speak or to give leaders time to negotiate. Once the need for a delay has ended, a senator may request unanimous consent to rescind the quorum call.

Journalist George Packer has argued that the Senate's arcane rules have rendered it obsolete and ineffective.

==== Debate ====
Debate, like most other matters governing the internal functioning of the Senate, is governed by internal rules adopted by the Senate. During a debate, senators may only speak if called upon by the presiding officer, but the presiding officer is required to recognize the first senator who rises to speak. Thus, the presiding officer has little control over the course of the debate. Customarily, the majority leader and minority leader are accorded priority during debates even if another senator rises first.

All speeches must be addressed to the presiding officer, who is addressed as "Mr. President" or "Madam President", and not to another member. Other Members must be referred to in the third person. In most cases, senators do not refer to each other by name, but by state or position, using forms such as "the senior senator from Virginia", "the gentleman from California", or "my distinguished friend the chairman of the Judiciary Committee". Senators address the Senate standing next to their desks.

Apart from rules governing civility, there are few restrictions on the content of speeches. There is no requirement that speeches pertain to the matter before the Senate.

The rules of the Senate provide that no senator may make more than two speeches on a motion or bill on the same legislative day. A legislative day begins when the Senate convenes and ends with adjournment. Hence, it does not necessarily coincide with the calendar day. The length of these speeches is not limited by the rules. In most cases, senators may speak for as long as they please. Often, the Senate adopts unanimous consent agreements imposing time limits. In other cases, for example, for the budget process, limits are imposed by statute. However, the right to unlimited debate is generally preserved.

Within the United States, the Senate is sometimes referred to as "world's greatest deliberative body".

==== Filibuster and cloture ====
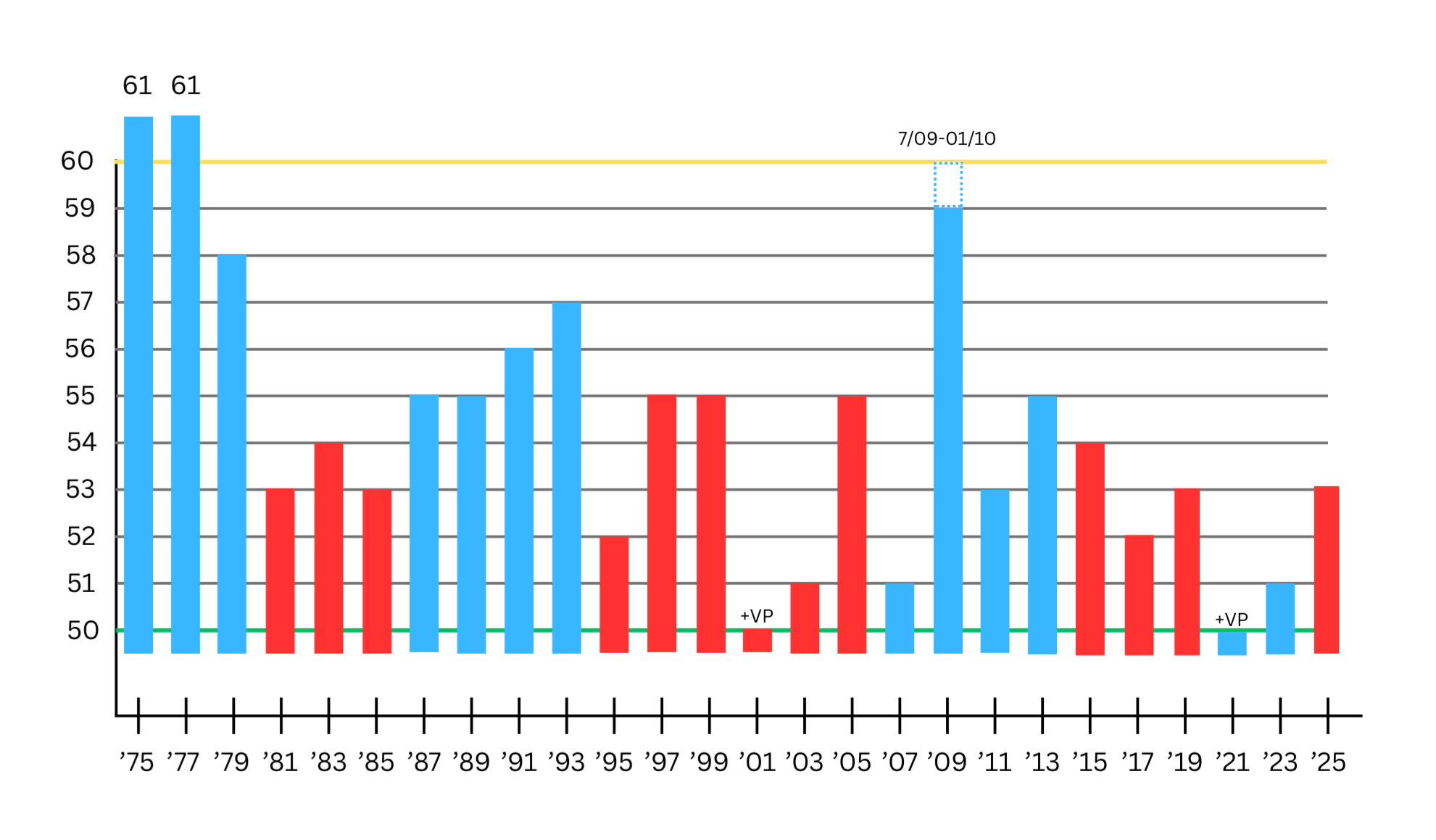
There have only been three filibuster-proof majorities since 1975, when cloture was reduced to 60 votes.

The filibuster is a tactic used to defeat bills and motions by prolonging debate indefinitely. A filibuster may entail long speeches, dilatory motions, and an extensive series of proposed amendments. The Senate may end a filibuster by invoking cloture. In most cases, cloture requires the support of three-fifths of the Senate,

If the matter before the Senate involves changing the rules of the body – this includes amending provisions regarding the filibuster – a two-thirds majority is required. In practice, the threat of filibuster is more important than its use. Almost any motion that does not have the support of three-fifths of the Senate effectively fails. This means that 41 senators can make a filibuster happen.

The history of filibusters began in 1805 when Aaron Burr suggested getting rid of procedural tools that were not in use, one of which was the motion to call "the previous question". Following this, in 1841, Senator John Calhoun rallied a number of Southern senators to take the floor, one after another for days, in opposition of the national bank. The national bank bill did pass, but Calhoun, and other Southern senators, continued using this tactic.

Filibuster efforts continued until 1917, when in response to a filibuster during World War I, President Woodrow Wilson demanded there be an ability to force a Senate vote. From this comes Senate rule XXIII, which provides the procedure of cloture. In the 1970s, the vote requirement for cloture was lowered and a new process of scheduling Senate business was instituted, in turn ending the "talking filibuster".

Historically, cloture has rarely been invoked because bipartisan support is usually necessary to obtain the required supermajority, so a bill that already has bipartisan support is rarely subject to threats of filibuster. However, motions for cloture have increased significantly in recent years. If the Senate invokes cloture, the debate does not necessarily end immediately; instead, it is limited to up to 30 additional hours unless increased by another three-fifths vote.

The longest filibuster speech in the Senate's history was delivered by Strom Thurmond (D-SC), who spoke for over 24 hours in an unsuccessful attempt to block the passage of the Civil Rights Act of 1957. The longest individual speech, though not technically a filibuster as there was no bill being blocked, in the Senate's history was delivered by Cory Booker (D-NJ) in 2025. Senator Booker spoke for 25 hours and five minutes, starting at 7 PM on the night of March 31 and ending April 1. Senator Booker's speech was intended to address actions of the Trump administration.

Under certain circumstances, the Congressional Budget Act of 1974 provides for a process called "reconciliation" by which Congress can pass bills related to the budget without those bills being subject to a filibuster. This is accomplished by limiting all Senate floor debate to 20 hours.

The Senate filibuster is frequently debated as the Constitution specifies a simple majority threshold to pass legislation, and some critics feel the de facto three-fifths threshold for general legislation prevents beneficial laws from passing. Steven Wirls argues that the filibuster, elevated in importance in 1917, was prominently and persistently wielded in defense of white supremacy. The nuclear option was exercised by both major parties in the 2010s to weaken the filibuster for confirmations. There is a desire within Congress to adjust the filibuster to lessen the amount of filibusters. Ways to reform the filibuster mainly include restoring a talking filibuster or adjusting the numbers of votes needed in varying ways. Supporters generally consider the filibuster to be an important protection for the minority views and a check against the unfettered single-party rule when the same party holds the Presidency and a majority in both the House and Senate.

==== Voting ====
When the debate concludes, the motion in question is put to a vote. The Senate often votes by voice vote. The presiding officer puts the question, and members respond either "Yea/Aye" (in favor of the motion) or "Nay" (against the motion). The presiding officer then announces the result of the voice vote. A senator may challenge the presiding officer's assessment and request a recorded vote. The request may be granted only if it is seconded by one-fifth of the senators present. In practice, however, senators second requests for recorded votes as a matter of courtesy.

When a recorded vote is held, the clerk calls the roll of the Senate in alphabetical order; senators respond when their name is called. Senators who were not in the chamber when their name was called may still cast a vote so long as the voting remains open. The vote is closed at the discretion of the presiding officer, but must remain open for a minimum of 15 minutes. A majority of those voting determines whether the motion carries. If the vote is tied, the vice president, if present, is entitled to cast a tie-breaking vote. If the vice president is not present, the motion fails.

Filibustered bills require a three-fifths majority to overcome the cloture vote, which usually means 60 votes. To pass a bill, a simple majority, usually 51 votes, is needed. Some news media have confused the 60 votes needed to overcome a filibuster with the 51 votes needed to approve a bill. For example, USA Today erroneously stating "The vote was 58–39 in favor of the provision establishing concealed carry permit reciprocity in the 48 states that have concealed weapons laws. That fell two votes short of the 60 needed to approve the measure".

==== Closed session ====
On occasion, the Senate may go into what is called a secret or closed session. During a closed session, the chamber doors are closed, cameras are turned off, and the galleries are completely cleared of anyone not sworn to secrecy, not instructed in the rules of the closed session, or not essential to the session. Closed sessions are rare and usually held only when the Senate is discussing sensitive subject matter such as information critical to national security, private communications from the president, or deliberations during impeachment trials. A senator may call for and force a closed session if the motion is seconded by at least one other member, but an agreement usually occurs beforehand.

If the Senate does not approve the release of a secret transcript, the transcript is stored in the Office of Senate Security and ultimately sent to the national archives. The proceedings remain sealed indefinitely until the Senate votes to remove the injunction of secrecy. In 1973, the House adopted a rule that all committee sessions should be open unless a majority on the committee voted for a closed session.

=== Committees ===
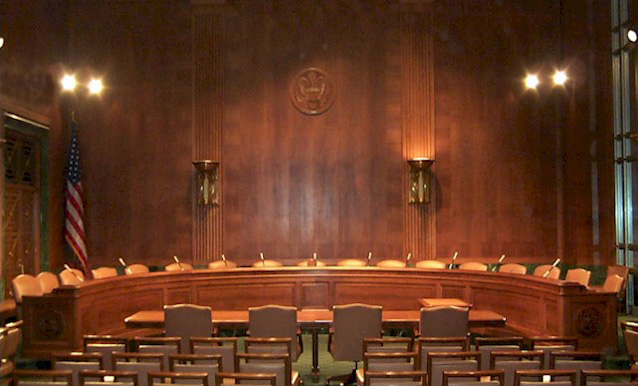
Committee Room 226 in the Dirksen Senate Office Building, used for hearings by the Senate Judiciary Committee

The Senate uses committees (and their subcommittees) for a variety of purposes, including the review of bills and the oversight of the executive branch. Formally, the whole Senate appoints committee members. In practice, the choice of members is made by the political parties. Generally, each party honors the preferences of individual senators, giving priority based on seniority. Each party is allocated seats on committees in proportion to its overall strength. Due to the bipartisan nature of committees, senators are occasionally able to find similarities across the aisle that are beyond their committee interest, which may aid them in getting bills passed in the future.

Most committee work is performed by 16 standing committees, each of which has jurisdiction over a field such as finance or foreign relations. Each standing committee may consider, amend, and report bills that fall under its jurisdiction. Each standing committee considers presidential nominations to offices related to its jurisdiction. For instance, the Judiciary Committee considers nominees for judgeships, and the Foreign Relations Committee considers nominees for positions in the Department of State. Committees may block nominees and impede bills from reaching the floor of the Senate. Standing committees also oversee the departments and agencies of the executive branch. In discharging their duties, standing committees have the power to hold hearings and to subpoena witnesses and evidence.

Each Senate committee and subcommittee is led by a chair (usually a member of the majority party). Formerly, committee chairs were determined purely by seniority; as a result, several elderly senators continued to serve as chair despite severe physical infirmity or even senility. Committee chairs are elected, but, in practice, seniority is rarely bypassed. The chairs hold extensive powers: they control the committee's agenda, and so decide how much, if any, time to devote to the consideration of a bill; they act with the power of the committee in disapproving or delaying a bill or a nomination by the president; they manage on the floor of the full Senate the consideration of those bills the committee reports. This last role was particularly important in mid-century, when floor amendments were thought not to be collegial. They also have considerable influence: senators who cooperate with their committee chairs are likely to accomplish more good for their states than those who do not. The Senate rules and customs were reformed in the twentieth century, largely in the 1970s. Committee chairmen have less power and are generally more moderate and collegial in exercising it, than they were before reform. The second-highest member, the spokesperson on the committee for the minority party, is known in most cases as the ranking member.

== Senate office buildings ==
External videos
- Senate Building, Washington DC, HD from 35mm

There are presently three Senate office buildings located along Constitution Avenue, north of the Capitol. They are the Russell Senate Office Building, the Dirksen Senate Office Building, and the Hart Senate Office Building.

== Criticism ==
The Senate has been characterized as a uniquely counter-majoritarian institution in relation to legislatures in other countries. Political scientist Robert Dahl wrote of the Senate, "the degree of unequal representation in the U.S. Senate is by far the most extreme [and a] profound violation of the democratic idea of political equality among citizens." The countermajoritarianism is rooted in two features. First, the Senate's apportionment scheme, which apportions seats based on states rather than population, resulting in a small-state advantage. Second, the filibuster enables a minority of the chamber to block action in the chamber.

The Senate's structure gives states with smaller populations the same number of senators (two) as states with larger populations. Historian Daniel Wirls contends that this structure makes the Senate "non-democratic", and Levitsky and Ziblatt argue that the Senate is America's most minoritarian (undemocratic) institution. The disparity in population between the most and least populous states has grown over time. In 1790, Virginia had 10 times the population of Rhode Island, while California had 70 times the population of Wyoming in 2020.

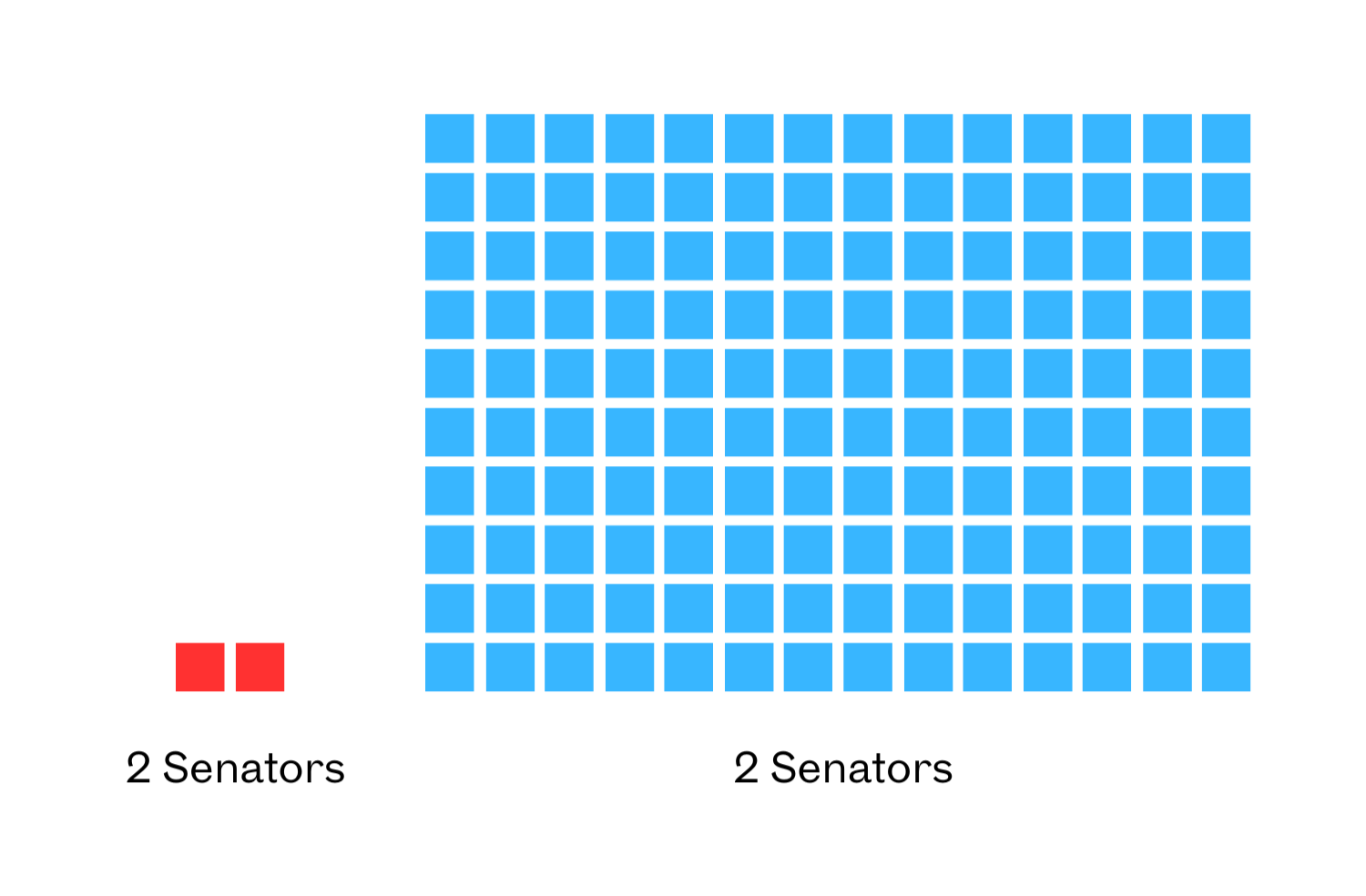
Despite a 1:70 ratio of Wyoming to California voters as of 2020, both states are guaranteed two senators.

U.S. citizens in the District of Columbia and in U.S. territories have never been represented in the Senate. One analysis of democracies by Harvard professors Daniel Ziblatt and Steven Levitsky found that only Argentina and Brazil's upper chambers deviate further from the one person, one vote principle than the U.S. Senate does. This disparity in representation between large and small states has increasingly favored Republicans since the 1960s, with David Wasserman estimating in 2018 that Democrats would need to keep winning the popular vote by more than 6% to maintain control of the Senate. Elizabeth Rusch and Daniel Lazare argue that the Senate's structure gives voters from small states disproportionate influence and allows them to benefit from disproportionate amounts of federal funding when compared to voters from larger states.

Ian Millhiser argues that the points made in favor of the status quo do not hold up since some states vote the same as large states, and that the current system was just a political compromise to unite 13 sovereign nations after the Revolutionary War. He also documents 21st century examples of how this malaportionment has led to the party receiving the most votes losing control of the Senate (and as a result, the Judiciary) and predicts the trend looks set to continue and possibly increase.

Law scholar William Eskridge notes that the Supreme Court explicitly argued in Reynolds v. Sims that, when states use Senate-style apportionment schemes (based on land rather than people), it clearly violates the equal protection clause of the Fourteenth Amendment, because Senate-style apportionment violates equal representation:

The right of a citizen to equal representation and to have [their] vote weighted equally with those of all other citizens in the election of members of one house of a bicameral state legislature would amount to little if States could effectively submerge the equal-population principle in the apportionment of seats in the other house. Deadlock between the two bodies might result in compromise and concession on some issues. But in all too many cases the more probable result would be frustration of the majority will through minority veto in the house not apportioned on a population basis[.]

By the beginning of the 21st century, two-thirds of legislatures globally had become unicameral, with the remaining upper houses tending to become more representative or less powerful; in contrast, the U.S. Senate remained an outlier by not following what Ziblatt and Levitsky refer to as a democratizing trend.

=== Counter-arguments ===
==== Stability ====
Political scientist William Connelly argues that the Senate's structure "provides stability and continuity, balancing the rapidly changing political winds of the House of Representatives".

==== Federalism ====
In the Australian Senate, senators are elected via single transferable vote proportional representation.

Yale legal scholar Akhil Reed Amar argues that the Senate's structure is integral to the federal system, ensuring that smaller states have a voice in the democratic process. Amar argues that the Senate should be reformed, with a degressively proportional allocation that provides at least one senator per state and a cap of eight for the largest state.

Other nations have adopted comparable structures that provide for equal representation of sub-national regions, regardless of population. These include Australia, where the Senate allocates twelve senators to each of the six original states (and two to each territory), and Switzerland, where each canton receives two seats (and each half-canton receives one seat) in the Council of States (Ständerat), regardless of population size.

== See also ==
- Divided government in the United States – Divided control of the US government between political parties
- Edward M. Kennedy Institute for the United States Senate – Educational institution and museum in Massachusetts
- Elections in the United States
- Reform of the Senate
- Minoritarianism – Primacy of a minority in decision-making

== Bibliography ==
- Baker, Richard A. The Senate of the United States: A Bicentennial History Krieger, 1988.
- Baker, Richard A., ed., First Among Equals: Outstanding Senate Leaders of the Twentieth Century Congressional Quarterly, 1991.
- Barone, Michael, and Grant Ujifusa, The Almanac of American Politics 1976: The Senators, the Representatives and the Governors: Their Records and Election Results, Their States and Districts (1975); new edition every two years
- David W. Brady and Mathew D. McCubbins. Party, Process, and Political Change in Congress: New Perspectives on the History of Congress (2002)
- Caro, Robert A. The Years of Lyndon Johnson. Vol. 3: Master of the Senate. Knopf, 2002.
- Comiskey, Michael. Seeking Justices: The Judging of Supreme Court Nominees U. Press of Kansas, 2004.
- Congressional Quarterly Congress and the Nation XII: 2005–2008: Politics and Policy in the 109th and 110th Congresses (2010); massive, highly detailed summary of Congressional activity, as well as major executive and judicial decisions; based on Congressional Quarterly Weekly Report and the annual CQ almanac. The Congress and the Nation 2009–2012 vol XIII has been announced for September 2014 publication.
  - Congressional Quarterly Congress and the Nation: 2001–2004 (2005);
  - Congressional Quarterly, Congress and the Nation: 1997–2001 (2002)
  - Congressional Quarterly. Congress and the Nation: 1993–1996 (1998)
  - Congressional Quarterly, Congress and the Nation: 1989–1992 (1993)
  - Congressional Quarterly, Congress and the Nation: 1985–1988 (1989)
  - Congressional Quarterly, Congress and the Nation: 1981–1984 (1985)
  - Congressional Quarterly, Congress and the Nation: 1977–1980 (1981)
  - Congressional Quarterly, Congress and the Nation: 1973–1976 (1977)
  - Congressional Quarterly, Congress and the Nation: 1969–1972 (1973)
  - Congressional Quarterly, Congress and the Nation: 1965–1968 (1969)
  - Congressional Quarterly, Congress and the Nation: 1945–1964 (1965), the first of the series
- Cooper, John Milton Jr. Breaking the Heart of the World: Woodrow Wilson and the Fight for the League of Nations. Cambridge U. Press, 2001.
- Davidson, Roger H., and Walter J. Oleszek, eds. (1998). Congress and Its Members, 6th ed. Washington DC: Congressional Quarterly. (Legislative procedure, informal practices, and member information)
- Gould, Lewis L. The Most Exclusive Club: A History Of The Modern United States Senate (2005)
- Hernon, Joseph Martin. Profiles in Character: Hubris and Heroism in the U.S. Senate, 1789–1990 Sharpe, 1997.
- Hoebeke, C. H. The Road to Mass Democracy: Original Intent and the Seventeenth Amendment. Transaction Books, 1995. (Popular elections of senators)
- Lee, Frances E. and Oppenheimer, Bruce I. Sizing Up the Senate: The Unequal Consequences of Equal Representation. U. of Chicago Press 1999. 304 pp.
- MacNeil, Neil and Richard A. Baker. The American Senate: An Insider's History. Oxford University Press, 2013. 455 pp.
- McFarland, Ernest W. The Ernest W. McFarland Papers: The United States Senate Years, 1940–1952. Prescott, Ariz.: Sharlot Hall Museum, 1995 (Democratic majority leader 1950–52)
- Malsberger, John W. From Obstruction to Moderation: The Transformation of Senate Conservatism, 1938–1952. Susquehanna U. Press 2000
- Mann, Robert. The Walls of Jericho: Lyndon Johnson, Hubert Humphrey, Richard Russell and the Struggle for Civil Rights. Harcourt Brace, 1996
- Ritchie, Donald A. (1991). Press Gallery: Congress and the Washington Correspondents. Harvard University Press.
- Ritchie, Donald A. (2001). The Congress of the United States: A Student Companion (2nd ed.). Oxford University Press.
- Ritchie, Donald A. (2010). The U.S. Congress: A Very Short Introduction. Oxford University Press.
- Rothman, David. Politics and Power the United States Senate 1869–1901 (1966)
- Swift, Elaine K. The Making of an American Senate: Reconstitutive Change in Congress, 1787–1841. U. of Michigan Press, 1996
- Valeo, Frank. Mike Mansfield, Majority Leader: A Different Kind of Senate, 1961–1976 Sharpe, 1999 (Senate Democratic leader)
- VanBeek, Stephen D. Post-Passage Politics: Bicameral Resolution in Congress. U. of Pittsburgh Press 1995
- Weller, Cecil Edward Jr. Joe T. Robinson: Always a Loyal Democrat. U. of Arkansas Press, 1998. (Arkansas Democrat who was Majority leader in 1930s)
- Wilson, Woodrow. Congressional Government. New York: Houghton Mifflin, 1885; also 15th ed. 1900, repr. by photoreprint, Transaction books, 2002.
- Zelizer, Julian E. On Capitol Hill : The Struggle to Reform Congress and its Consequences, 1948–2000 (2006)
- Zelizer, Julian E., ed. The American Congress: The Building of Democracy (2004) (overview)

=== Official Senate histories ===
- Biographical Directory of the United States Congress, 1774–1989

The following are published by the Senate Historical Office.

- Robert Byrd. The Senate, 1789–1989. Four volumes.
  - Vol. I, a chronological series of addresses on the history of the Senate
  - Vol. II, a topical series of addresses on various aspects of the Senate's operation and powers
  - Vol. III, Classic Speeches, 1830–1993
  - Vol. IV, Historical Statistics, 1789–1992
- Dole, Bob. Historical Almanac of the United States Senate
- Hatfield, Mark O., with the Senate Historical Office. Vice Presidents of the United States, 1789–1993 (essays reprinted online)
- Frumin, Alan S. Riddick's Senate Procedure. Washington, D.C.: Government Printing Office, 1992.
