= The Japanese Empire (book) =

2017 history book by S. C. M. Paine

The Japanese Empire: Grand Strategy from the Meiji Restoration to the Pacific War
- Author: S. C. M. Paine
- Language: English
- Genre: History
- Published: March 2017
- Publisher: Cambridge University Press
- Publication place: United Kingdom
- Pages: 218
- ISBN: 9781107676169

The Japanese Empire: Grand Strategy from the Meiji Restoration to the Pacific War is a 2017 history book by S. C. M. Paine about the Empire of Japan. The Japanese Empire is the most recent publication by Paine, after 2012's The Wars for Asia, 1911–1949. Unlike her previous works, this book focuses chiefly on Japan, whereas her other works had instead focused on Russia or China.

== Contents ==
The Japanese Empire details the history of Japan, in particular, its attempts to become a great power, from the beginning of the Meiji era in 1868, to the end of the Pacific War in 1945, and how this can be applied to contemporary American foreign policy. The book focuses on Japan's grand strategy, which, in Paine's description, "integrates all relevant elements of national power. It extends far beyond military power to encompass economic influence, co-ordination with allies, intelligence gathering and analysis, propaganda, institution building, international law, etc." Paine argues in the book that the lack of a properly defined grand strategy was the cause of Japan's military failures during the 1930s and 1940s.

The book is divided into seven chapters – the first is an introduction of Meiji-era Japan, chapters two and three deal with the First Sino-Japanese War and Russo-Japanese War respectively, chapter four is about the interwar period, running from 1906 to 1931, chapters five and six detail the "fourteen year war" (1931–1945), and the final chapter serves as the book's conclusion, and places the conflicts of the Japanese Empire in a wider social and historical context. Each of the chapters address the underlying and proximate causes of the conflicts, the outcomes of significant battles, and the grand strategies of the nations involved.

== Reception ==
Tonio Andrade of Emory University praised The Japanese Empire's "clear and vibrant prose", and called it "a vital contribution not just to the history of Japan, but to the study of global geopolitics and grand strategy". Similarly, Louis G. Perez of Illinois State University gave attention to Paine's "sophisticated and nuanced scholarship", and suggested that the book "should be required reading for any scholar of modern Japanese history". Strife Journal praised the focus on grand strategy, saying that it "offers readers a unique vantage point" and "presents not only a coherent, but also a compelling narrative, of how the Japanese went from the ascendant Meiji Restoration to suffering the devastation of the atom bombs dropped on Hiroshima and Nagasaki."

In The Japanese Empire, Paine argued that Imperial Japan shifted its military power from maritime to continental, and that, by their nature, continental powers encourage conflict, whereas maritime powers encourage peace, which some reviewers considered overly simplistic and lacking in nuance compared to the rest of the book. David Stoffey of Charged Affairs opined that "world leaders would be wise to find value in her arguments for wartime speed and objectivity. Conversely, however, her second thesis stumbles to broad, binary arguments and subsequently fails to find equal application. Continental powers can be as peaceful as maritime ones—the Congress of Vienna is excellent proof."
