= William Hammond (historian) =

American historian

Dr. William Hammond (January 1, 1943 - November 27, 2022) was an American historian who specialized in the United States’ conflicts in Southeast Asia, especially Vietnam. He worked in Washington, D.C. for the Army Center of Military History. During his career, he wrote two books about Korea and Vietnam and mentored several more. He was best known for his widely praised account of media and military relations during the Vietnam War. Hammond later worked as an adjunct professor at Harvard University, teaching courses about Vietnam and military-media history. Since his publication of his hit journal article "Objectivity and Its Discotents in the 1960s and 70s" He was widely regarded as one of the leading historians in American involvement in Vietnam and the media coverage.

== Education ==
Hammond matriculated at The Catholic University of America in Washington DC. After earning his bachelor's degree in medieval history, Hammond continued at Catholic University. Hammond earned his Ph.D. in history in 1972.

== Career ==
In 1972, Hammond began working as a civilian for the United States Army Center of Military History for almost forty years, becoming Chief of the General Histories Branch. before that he worked as a librarian. While at the Center, Hammond co-authored Black Soldier, White Army, a history of African American soldiers during the Korean War and the end of segregation in the army. His two volume series about the military and the media during Vietnam was released as a condensed version in 1998, titled Reporting Vietnam: Media and the Military at War. The book would later win the Richard W. Leopold Prize two years later. Stephen Ambrose called it "the best study of the press and the armed forces ever written."

Starting in 1991, Hammond began teaching honors seminars at the University of Maryland. He was a senior lecturer and offered classes such as the Military and the Media in American History and The United States in Vietnam.

== Notable works ==
- Public Affairs: The Media and the Military, 1962 - 1968 (1988)
- Public Affairs: The Military and the Media, 1968–1973 (1996)
- Black Soldier, White Army: The 24th Infantry Regiment in Korea (1996)
- Reporting Vietnam: Media and Military at War (1998)
