= J. Samuel Walker =

American historian

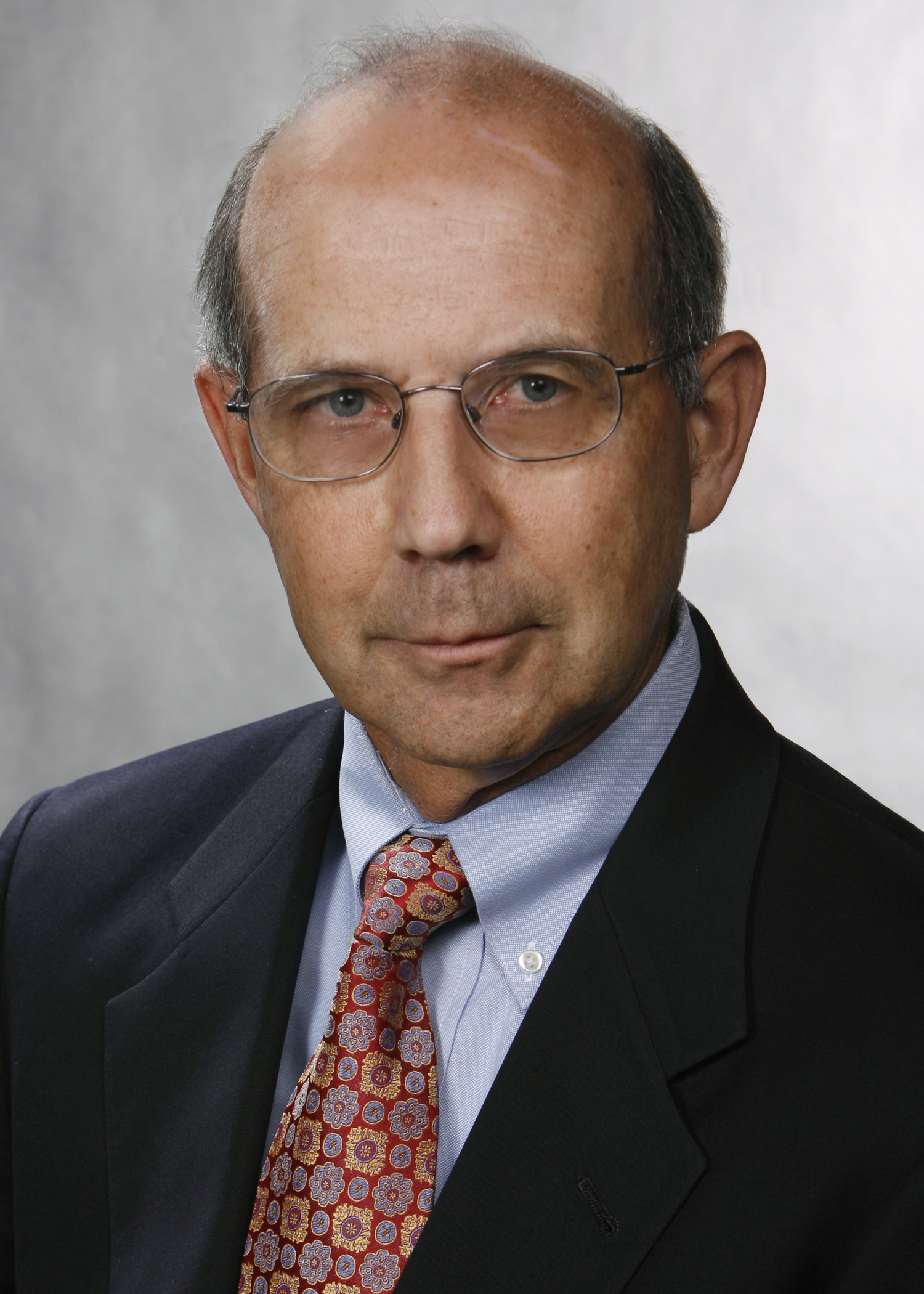
- J. Samuel Walker in 2008
- Born: June 8, 1946 (age 80)
- Education: Ph.D., University of Maryland
- Occupations: Historian, retired
- Employer: United States Nuclear Regulatory Commission

J. Samuel Walker is an American historian and author based in Maryland, most notable for his research and writing on the nuclear age, both weaponry and atomic energy. Several of his books have earned broad-based critical acclaim and advanced novel viewpoints. Despite affiliation with government and the nuclear industry, he is cited by the peace movement and parties who are highly critical of nuclear energy.

== Employment with the Nuclear Regulatory Commission ==
Walker was a history instructor at the University of Maryland in the mid-seventies but was hired by the Nuclear Regulatory Commission (NRC) in June, 1979, working under the chief historian, George T. Mazuzan. Walker was able to write in a lucid manner applauded in popular science press.

=== Prompt and Utter Destruction ===
Roger Chapman, writing in Bowling Green's university press, characterized the book on the atomic bombing of Japan as "a brave attempt to bridge two diametrically opposed positions" about whether the bombings were necessary, justified or humane. David Hendrickson, writing in Foreign Affairs, stated that Walker's position was "that some officials saw diplomatic benefits 'vis-a-vis' the Soviets from the use of the bomb but insists that such motivations were of decidedly secondary importance."

=== Three Mile Island ===
He also authored a comprehensive review of the Three Mile Island accident. According to his own account, Walker's work debunked the "grievous misconstructions [which] were portrayals of the bubble issue that were central features of at least two books that came out shortly after the accident (in 1982) and in three television programs..." Walker disputed the alleged imminence of an explosion; a central point of his argument was that if the situation was as dangerous as previous writers contended, that Jimmy Carter would not have been permitted to visit the TMI power plant.

=== The Road to Yucca Mountain ===
In The Road to Yucca Mountain, Walker covers the U.S. government's controversial attempts to address the engineering and social issues associated with high-level radioactive waste repository (HLRWR) management and spent reactor fuel (SRF). He starts with the Manhattan Project and works through the policy debate. In 1987, Yucca Mountain, Nevada emerged as the most likely candidate for a repository. He explicates the United States Atomic Energy Commission's flop with its first attempt to build a HLRWR in a Kansas salt mine. He addresses deep geological disposal and surface storage of HLRW and SRF as well as fuel reprocessing.

The Organization of American Historians awarded the book the 2010 Richard W. Leopold Prize for historical work being done by historians outside academia.

== Books ==
- Walker, J. Samuel (1997). Prompt and Utter Destruction: Truman and the Use of Atomic Bombs Against Japan. Chapel Hill and London: University of North Carolina Press. ISBN 978-0-8078-2361-3.
- — (2006). Three Mile Island: A Nuclear Crisis in Historical Perspective. University of California Press. ISBN 9780520246836.
- — (2009). The Road to Yucca Mountain: The Development of Radioactive Waste Policy in the United States. University of California Press. ISBN 978-0-520-26045-0.
- — (2023). The Day That Shook America: A Concise History of 9/11. University Press of Kansas. ISBN 978-0-7006-32619.
- — (2026). Nixon's War with Students: Campus Unrest in the Vietnam Era. University Press of Kansas. ISBN 978-0-7006-41963.
