= Betty Koed =

American historian

3rd Historian of the United States Senate
- In office June 1, 2015 – October 2023
- Preceded by: Donald A. Ritchie
- Succeeded by: Katherine A. Scott

Personal details
- Education: Santa Barbara City College; University of California, Santa Barbara (BA, MA, PhD)

Betty K. Koed is an American historian who was the third Historian of the United States Senate and the first woman to hold that position. Upon her retirement, the US Senate designated her as Historian Emerita of the United States Senate.

Koed graduated from the University of California, Santa Barbara in 1983 and received a bachelor's in English. She went on to earn her master's and PhD in history, also from University of California, Santa Barbara, in 1991 and 1999 respectively, after beginning her career as a technical writer. While pursuing her PhD, Koed studied with Otis L. Graham Jr. and Robert Kelley at the University of California, Santa Barbara.

She later went on to teach American History at the University of California, Santa Barbara before joining the Senate Historical Office in 1998.

Koed won the Distinguished Alumni Award from UC Santa Barbara in 2016.

In 2022, Koed authored the book Scenes: People, places, and events that shaped the United States Senate, which "presents a collection of 150 scenes from Senate history."

Government offices
Preceded by Donald A. Ritchie	3rd Historian of the United States Senate; 2015 – 2023	Succeeded by Katherine A. Scott
