= Biographical Directory of the United States Congress =

American biographical dictionary

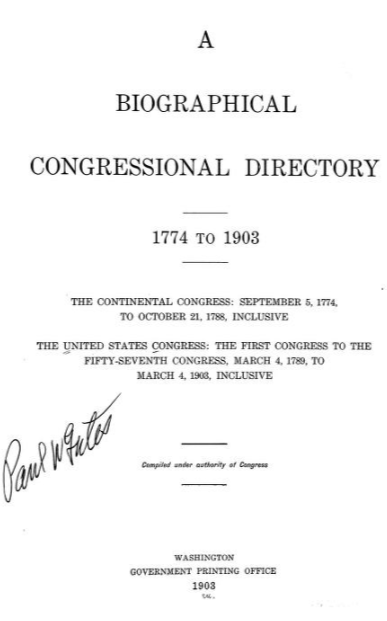
- Cover of the 1903 edition of the Biographical Directory of the United States Congress
- Author: United States Congress Joint Committee on Printing
- Language: English
- Subject: Political Reference
- Publisher: United States Government Printing Office
- Publication date: 1859 to present
- Publication place: United States
- Media type: Print (Paperback)
- Website: bioguide.congress.gov

The Biographical Directory of the United States Congress (Bioguide) is a biographical dictionary of all present and former members of the United States Congress and its predecessors, the Continental Congress and the Confederation Congress. Also included are Delegates from territories and the District of Columbia and Resident Commissioners from the Philippines and Puerto Rico.

The online edition has a guide to the research collections of institutions where a member's papers, letters, correspondence, and other items are archived, as well as an extended bibliography of published works concerning the member (a shorter bibliography is included with the member's biography). These additional resources, when available, can be accessed via links at the left side of the member's page on the website.

== History ==
Charles Lanman, author, journalist, and former secretary to Daniel Webster, gathered the first collection of biographies of former and sitting members of Congress for his Dictionary of Congress, published by J. B. Lippincott & Co. in 1859. Lanman intended his Dictionary of the United States Congress to serve as a guide for sitting Members of Congress, similar to the modern Congressional Directory.

In 1864, the House of Representatives and the Senate approved the publication of an updated version of Lanman's Dictionary of Congress by the new Government Printing Office. In the late 1860s Congress offered Benjamin Perley Poore, a journalist and clerk of the Senate Committee on Printing and Records, the job of preparing a Congressional Directory with biographical sketches and the kind of reference information found in the Dictionary of Congress.

In anticipation of the centenary of American independence and in search of a market not served by Poore's Congressional Directory, Lanman prepared the Biographical Annals of the Civil Government of the United States, published by James Anglim of Washington, D.C. in 1876. This volume combined the biographies of the Dictionary of Congress with entries for other governmental officials since 1776 and expanded reference tables. Poore offered a competing historical volume in 1878 with his Political Register and Congressional Directory, published by Houghton, Osgood and Company, Boston.

Joseph M. Morrison's revision of Lanman's Biographical Annals (New York, 1887) was the final directory of congressional biography to be prepared and published privately. In 1903 Congress authorized the publication of A Biographical Congressional Directory, 1774 to 1903. Compiled under the direction of O. M. Enyart, this was the first volume prepared by congressional staff who drew on the Lanman and Poore editions as well as biographical information printed in the Congressional Directory since the 40th United States Congress (1867). The most thorough and systematic revision of biographical entries attempted prior to the Bicentennial Edition (1989) was conducted in preparation for the Biographical Directory of the American Congress, 1774–1927. Ansel Wold, chief clerk of the Joint Committee on Printing, directed the compilation of this volume published in 1928.

The 1920s survey yielded more detailed and consistent biographies than those in the nineteenth-century editions or in the earlier volumes compiled by congressional staff, but its frequent reliance on family legends and personal recollections introduced dubious information. Although Congress authorized updates that were published in 1949–50, 1961, and 1971, the entries from the 1928 edition remained virtually intact in the three subsequent editions. The creation of the Senate Historical Office in 1975 and the Office for the Bicentennial in the United States House of Representatives in 1983 provided the first opportunity for professional historians to revise and update the Biographical Directory. Earlier editions of the Biographical Directory and their nineteenth century predecessors offered little information on congressional careers other than terms of service. The bicentennial edition (1989) provided a more complete record of the individual members' years in office. A 1996 edition was published by Congressional Quarterly, but did not achieve wide circulation because of its much higher price. Congress issued an updated print edition in 2005.

The development and growing use of the Internet in the 1990s led to the creation of websites for the House of Representatives and the Senate. Ray Strong, House Historian and Assistant to the Clerk of the House, advocated publication of the entries from the Biographical Directory on the Internet. Through the efforts of Joe Carmel, Cindy S. Leach, and Gary Hahn of Legislative Computer Systems under the Clerk of the House, and Cheri Allen of the Office of the Secretary of the Senate, the entries of the Biographical Directory became available online during the week of November 9, 1998, at under the auspices of the House Legislative Resource Center and the Historian of the Senate. Internet technology offered the capability to update the Biographical Directory on a daily basis. Besides the biographies, the online database includes extensive bibliographies and a guide to all available research collections for Senate and House entries. The project was the first SGML/XML project for the House and Senate and paved the way for the drafting of legislation in XML in both chambers.

The publicly available online directory has benefited from updated information provided to the House Office of the Historian and the Senate Historical Office from scholars, librarians, genealogists, and family members. Senate entries are accompanied by an image of the Senator, when available. Online House entries include images for Members and Speakers with official oil portraits and members since the 109th United States Congress (2005). The records are maintained by staff in the House Office of the Historian and the Senate Office of the Historian.
