= Sarah C. M. Paine =

American historian (born 1957)

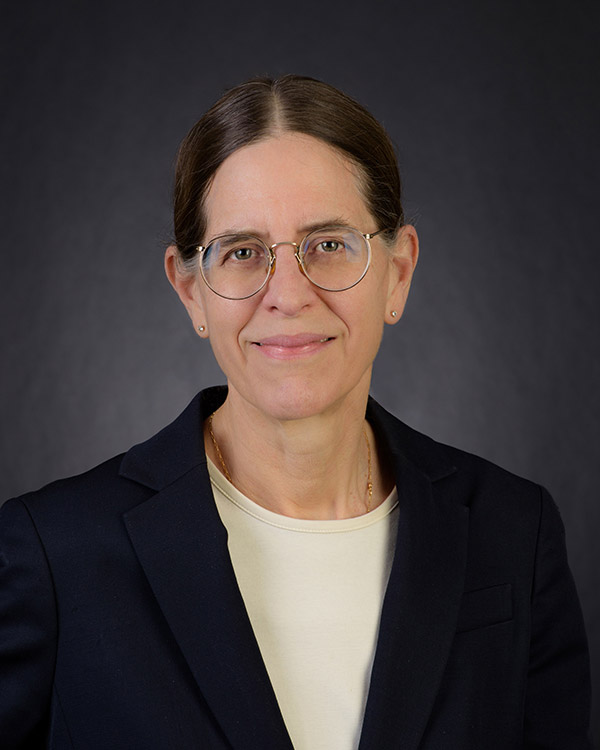
- Paine in 2018
- Born: Sarah Crosby Mallory Paine; 1957 (age 68–69)

Academic background
- Education: Harvard University (BA 1979); Middlebury College (MA 1989); Columbia University (MIA 1984, PhD 1993)

Academic work
- Discipline: History
- Sub-discipline: Naval history; Grand strategy; Modern East Asian history
- Institutions: U.S. Naval War College
- Notable works: The Wars for Asia 1911–1949; The Japanese Empire

Sarah Crosby Mallory Paine (born 1957) is an American historian who was the William S. Sims University Professor of History and Grand Strategy at the U.S. Naval War College in Newport, Rhode Island. She has written and co-edited several books on naval policy and grand strategy, as well as subjects of interest to the United States Navy or Department of Defense. Other works she has authored concern the political and military history of East Asia, particularly China and Japan, during the modern era.

== Education ==
Paine graduated with a bachelor's degree, magna cum laude, in Latin American studies from Harvard College in 1979. She then obtained an Master of International Affairs degree from the School of International and Public Affairs of Columbia University in 1984, and an master's degree in Russian from Middlebury College in 1989. She spent ten years on her doctoral research on Russian and Chinese history at Columbia University, which included five years of research and language study in China, Taiwan, Russia, Japan, and Australia. She received her doctorate in history from Columbia in 1993. She has received two Title VIII fellowships from the Hoover Institution, two Fulbright fellowships, and other fellowships from Japan, Taiwan, and Australia.

== Career ==
Paine began her career at the Naval War College as an associate professor in 2000, and was promoted to full professor in 2006. From 2014 to 2025 she was the William S. Sims University Professor of History and Grand Strategy, and also held the position of Ernest J. King Professor of Maritime History.

== Personal life ==
Paine has three brothers, including John B. Paine III, and Thomas M. Paine. She is married to historian Bruce Elleman.

== Selected publications ==
=== Author ===
- Imperial Rivals: China, Russia, and Their Disputed Frontier, 1858–1924 (M.E. Sharpe, 1996). Winner of the 1997 Barbara Jelavich Book Prize.
- The Sino-Japanese War of 1894–1895: Perceptions, Power, and Primacy (Cambridge University Press, 2003).
- The Wars for Asia 1911–1949 (Cambridge University Press, 2012). 2012 Winner of the PROSE award for European & World History and longlisted for the Lionel Gelber prize.
- The Japanese Empire: Grand Strategy from the Meiji Restoration to the Pacific War (Cambridge University Press, 2017).
- "Japan caught between maritime and continental imperialism", in The Makers of Modern Strategy: From the Ancient World to the Digital Age (Princeton University Press, 2023, pages 415–439).

Co-author with Bruce A. Elleman:

- Modern China: Continuity and Change, 1644 to the Present (Prentice Hall, 2010).
