= Donald A. Ritchie =

American historian (born 1945)

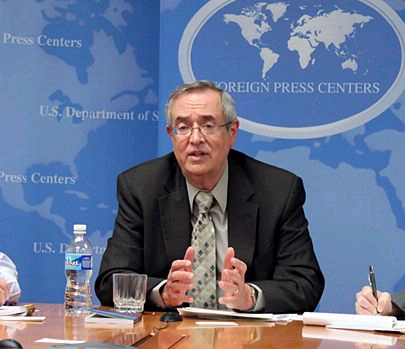
- Donald A. Ritchie in 2011.

2nd Historian of the United States Senate
- In office 2009–2015
- Preceded by: Richard A. Baker
- Succeeded by: Betty Koed

Personal details
- Born: December 23, 1945 (age 80)
- Education: City College of New York (BA); University of Maryland, College Park (MS, PhD)

Donald A. Ritchie (born December 23, 1945) is Historian Emeritus of the United States Senate.

== Education ==
He graduated from the City College of New York in 1967; and received a master's degree, in 1969, and a Ph.D., in 1975, from the University of Maryland, College Park.

== Career ==
Ritchie served in the U.S. Marine Corps from 1969 to 1971.

As associate historian in the Senate Historical Office, beginning in 1976, Ritchie conducted oral history interviews with former senators and retired members of Senate staff as part of the Senate oral history project. In 2009 he became the Senate historian, succeeding Richard Baker, and held that post until his retirement in 2015.

Ritchie was responsible for editing the closed hearing transcripts of Senator Joseph R. McCarthy's investigations, and has authored a number of books including Electing FDR. His book Press Gallery: Congress and the Washington Correspondents won him the Richard W. Leopold Prize of the Organization of American Historians. He has served as president of the Oral History Association and on the councils of the American Historical Association and the International Oral History Association, as well as on the board of the Society for History in the Federal Government.

== Works ==
External videos
- Booknotes interview with Ritchie on Press Gallery, July 7, 1991, C-SPAN
- After Words interview with Ritchie on Reporting from Washington, March 6, 2005, C-SPAN
- Washington Journal interview with Ritchie on Our Constitution, April 6, 2007, C-SPAN
- Presentation by Ritchie on Electing FDR, February 14, 2008, C-SPAN
- Q&A interview with Ritchie on The U.S. Congress: A Very Short Introduction, August 15, 2010, C-SPAN
- Interview with Ritchie on The Columnist, February 12, 2021, C-SPAN
- Q&A interview with Ritchie on The Columnist, July 11, 2021, C-SPAN

Academic:

- James M. Landis: Dean of the Regulators. Harvard University Press. 1980.
- Press Gallery: Congress and the Washington Correspondents. Harvard University Press. 1991. ISBN 978-0-674-70375-9
- The Congress of the United States: A Student Companion. Oxford University Press. 1993. ISBN 978-0-19-530924-9.
- American Journalists: Getting the Story. Oxford University Press. 1997. ISBN 978-0-19-509907-2.
- Reporting from Washington: The History of the Washington Press Corps. Oxford University Press. 2005. ISBN 978-0-19-517861-6.
- Our Constitution. Oxford University Press. 2006. ISBN 978-0-19-522385-9
- Electing FDR: The New Deal Campaign of 1932. University Press of Kansas. 2007. ISBN 978-0-7006-1687-9
- The U.S. Congress: A Very Short Introduction. Oxford University Press. 2010.
- Doing Oral History. Oxford University Press. 2014. ISBN 978-0-19-932933-5.
- The Columnist: Leaks, Lies, and Libel in Drew Pearson's Washington. Oxford University Press. 2021.
- Washington's Iron Butterfly: Bess Clements Abell, an Oral History, with Terry L. Birdwhistell. University Press of Kentucky. 2022.

Textbooks:

- United States History and Geography, The American Vision, The American Republic, and The American Journey, with Joyce Appleby, Alan Brinkley, Albert Broussard, and James McPherson (Glencoe/McGraw-Hill)
- United States Government, with Richard C. Remy, Lena Morreale Scott, and Megan L. Hanson (McGraw-Hill).

Editing:

- Executive Sessions of the Senate Permanent Subcommittee on Investigations (McCarthy Hearings, 1953-1954). (Government Printing Office, 2003).
- The Oxford Handbook of Oral History (Oxford University Press, 2010)
- Congress and Harry S. Truman: A Conflicted Legacy (Truman State University Press, 2011)

Government offices
Preceded by Richard A. Baker	2nd Historian of the United States Senate; 2009 – 2015	Succeeded by Betty Koed
