= Richard A. Baker (historian) =

American historian (born 1940)

Richard Baker
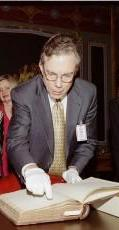

1st Historian of the United States Senate
- In office 1975–2009
- Preceded by: Position established
- Succeeded by: Donald A. Ritchie

Personal details
- Born: March 18, 1940 (age 86)
- Education: University of Massachusetts, Amherst (BA); Michigan State University (MA); Columbia University (MLS); University of Maryland, College Park (PhD)

Richard Allan Baker (born March 18, 1940) was the first Historian of the United States Senate, serving through August 2009. He directed the United States Senate Historical Office from the time of its creation in 1975.

He wrote a weekly column on Senate history for a Washington newspaper (The Hill) and is the co-author (with Neil MacNeil) of the D.B. Hardeman Prize-winning The American Senate: An Insider's History, published in 2013, a history of Senate rules and customs.

== Education ==
Baker graduated with a bachelor's in history from the University of Massachusetts, Amherst in 1962, a master's in history from Michigan State University in 1965, a Master of Library Science from Columbia University in 1968, and a doctorate in history from the University of Maryland, College Park in 1982.

== Historian of the Senate ==
Following the Watergate scandal, the US Congress established the office of Senate historian to encourage and formalize record-keeping. Baker assumed the new post in 1975, and would continue in this role for the next 34 years.

Beginning in 1997, at the request of Senate Democratic Leader Thomas Daschle, Baker routinely opened the weekly luncheon meetings of the Democratic Caucus of the United States Senate with a brief historical anecdote or minute. These short essays were wide-ranging in topic and highlight recurring themes in the Senate's institutional development. Shortly before Baker's retirement, the Senate passed a unanimous resolution naming him the "historian emeritus of the United States Senate."

In 2009, at the time of Baker's retirement, Senate Republican Leader Mitch McConnell initiated a similar program for his party's members. Both Democratic and Republican programs are currently active, relying on presentations by the Senate's Historian and Associate Historian.

== Authorship ==
- "Conservation Politics: The Senate Career of Clinton P. Anderson" (University of New Mexico Press, 1985)
- "The Senate of the United States: A Bicentennial History" (Krieger, 1988)
- "First Among Equals: Outstanding Senate Leaders of the Twentieth Century" (Congressional Quarterly, 1991) (coeditor)
- "200 Notable Days: Senate Stories 1787 to 2002" (Government Printing Office, 2006)
- "The American Senate: An Insider's History" co-authored with Neil MacNeil (Oxford University Press, 2013)

Government offices
New office	1st Historian of the United States Senate; 1975 – 2009	Succeeded by Donald A. Ritchie
