= Historian of the United States Senate =

Historian position in the U.S. Senate

The historian of the United States Senate heads the United States Senate Historical Office, which was created in 1975 to record and preserve historical information about the United States Senate. The current Historian of the United States Senate is Katherine A. Scott.

== Purpose ==
Serving as the Senate's institutional memory, the Historical Office collects and provides information on important events, precedents, dates, statistics, and historical comparisons of current and past Senate activities for use by members and staff, the media, scholars, and the general public. The office advises senators and committees on cost-effective disposition of their non-current office files, assists researchers seeking access to Senate records, and maintains automated information databases detailing locations of former members' papers.

It conducts oral history interviews with retired senior Senate staff and keeps extensive biographical and bibliographical information on former senators. Many of these interviews are available on the Senate website. A collection of more than thirty thousand Senate-related photographs and other illustrations is available for research and publication use. The Historical Office and its staff has also produced numerous publications through the years, covering all aspects of Senate history.

== List of Senate historians ==
- Richard A. Baker 1975–2009
- Donald A. Ritchie 2009–2015
- Betty K. Koed 2015–2023
- Katherine A. Scott 2023–present
