= The Wars for Asia, 1911–1949 =

Book by Sarah C. Paine

The Wars for Asia 1911–1949
- First edition cover
- Author: S. C. M. Paine
- Language: English
- Subject: Asian military and political history, 1911–1945
- Genre: Military history
- Published: 2012
- Publication place: United States
- Pages: 498
- ISBN: 1107020697

The Wars for Asia 1911–1949 by S. C. M. Paine is a book published in 2012 by Cambridge University Press. The work presents a view of three "nested wars" in early twentieth century East Asia, seen as distinct conflicts which, while carried on simultaneously, had their own welter of cause and dynamic: the Chinese Civil War 1911–1949; the Second Sino-Japanese War 1931–1945; the Second World War 1941–1945.

== Content summary ==
The principal participants discussed here were Japan, China, and Russia. The first part of Paine's work describes each in terms of their political-economic stance and condition, and their different war aims and strategies. Mention is also made of Germany and the United States. Concerning Japan during this era, its Kwantung Army in 1931 with regard to Manchuria made crucial decisions independently of the central government in Tokyo. Several assassinations of civilian politicians followed; in the end, the army's expansionist policies prevailed. In China a fragile republic which lacked country-wide authority had been founded by Sun Yat-sen. In the late 1920s under Chiang Kai-shek the republic became a national power in China, but unity in the chain of command eluded its government; it remained a shifting coalition of warlords. In 1917 the Bolsheviks had seized power in Russia. The Soviet government inherited the expansionist policies of the czars, yet, Paine argues, duplicitously managed to project a benign international image sustained by the allure of its then novel party ideology.

In her second and longer part, Paine gives a chronological narrative of the events of the three wars. After a review of the early years of the Civil War, she picks up the thread in 1937 with the military history, while touching regularly on political matters, fiscal policy, and the world context. Paine situates the long Chinese Civil War in terms of a dynastic interregnum, which are recurrent in Chinese history. Normatively the passage between eras involves a transformative armed struggle for sovereign power between rivals. The Qing dynasty, whose Manchu rulers were in decline, fell in 1911. During the disorder and chaos caused by the ensuing violent struggle among the Chinese, the armies of Imperial Japan, already established in "Manchukuo", in 1931 launched a further invasion of China. This attack sparked Chinese nationalism and hatred of the Japanese. This Sino-Japanese war eventually spread across China and beyond, creating a regional war. According to Paine, in this contest Japan's chief target remained throughout the Republic of China. Consequently this regional conflict tipped the balance in the preexisting civil war in favor of the insurgent Chinese Communist Party under Mao Zedong, despite Japan's continually reiterated state policy of hostility to communism.

Paine writes that during the 1920s Soviet Russia had recognized the importance of China, and understood that its interests required political, diplomatic, and military involvement. Accordingly, the Soviets dealt extensively with the Kuomintang (KMT) party which led the Chinese Republic, and with the KMT's Chinese Communists allies, rivals, and eventual enemies. Soviet Russia also contended directly with Japan. Here the Soviets by the early 1940s successfully managed to deter an all-out war with Japan and to steer the destruction of the conflict away from Russia's borders, thus avoiding a two-front war. Hence, Soviet Russia had framed the impact of World War II. In 1941 the Japanese, in a strategic decision made in terms of winning their war in China, attacked Pearl Harbor and European colonies. The complex result in East Asia was the coincidence of the three wars: the Chinese Civil War, the Second Sino-Japanese War, and the Second World War. That world war, and with it the regional war, would end in 1945 with Japan defeated but the KMT weak. Thereafter the final act of the Chinese Civil War commenced, starting in Manchuria. Here the Soviet-supplied Chinese Communists prevailed, then conquered the south by 1949. Paine argues that, despite massive American military assistance to the nationalist Kuomintang during World War II, it was the Communists who had secured what traditionally was called the "mandate of heaven" or the legitimacy to rule a unified China at the start of a new era.

== Appraisal ==
The work covers ground in some detail that was previously rather neglected in the history literature written in English. The book won the 2012 PROSE award for European & World History and was longlisted for the Lionel Gelber prize.
