= List of Booknotes interviews =

Booknotes is an American television series on the C-SPAN network hosted by Brian Lamb, which originally aired from 1989 to 2004. The format of the show is a one-hour, one-on-one interview with a non-fiction author.

As the series featured almost 800 interviews a single list is not practical so individual lists are arranged by the year of first broadcast:

- List of Booknotes interviews first aired in 1989 - 41 interviews
- List of Booknotes interviews first aired in 1990 - 51 interviews
- List of Booknotes interviews first aired in 1991 - 50 interviews
- List of Booknotes interviews first aired in 1992 - 45 interviews
- List of Booknotes interviews first aired in 1993 - 51 interviews
- List of Booknotes interviews first aired in 1994 - 51 interviews
- List of Booknotes interviews first aired in 1995 - 54 interviews
- List of Booknotes interviews first aired in 1996 - 49 interviews
- List of Booknotes interviews first aired in 1997 - 50 interviews
- List of Booknotes interviews first aired in 1998 - 52 interviews
- List of Booknotes interviews first aired in 1999 - 52 interviews
- List of Booknotes interviews first aired in 2000 - 49 interviews
- List of Booknotes interviews first aired in 2001 - 53 interviews
- List of Booknotes interviews first aired in 2002 - 52 interviews
- List of Booknotes interviews first aired in 2003 - 51 interviews
- List of Booknotes interviews first aired in 2004 - 48 interviews
