= List of Booknotes interviews first aired in 2001 =

Booknotes is an American television series on the C-SPAN network hosted by Brian Lamb, which originally aired from 1989 to 2004. The format of the show is a one-hour, one-on-one interview with a non-fiction author. The series was broadcast at 8 p.m. Eastern Time each Sunday night, and was the longest-running author interview program in U.S. broadcast history.

| First broadcast (with link to transcript / video) | Author | Book | Subject matter |
|---|---|---|---|
| January 7, 2001 | Martin Goldsmith | The Inextinguishable Symphony | Jüdischer Kulturbund; Category:Jewish emigration from Nazi Germany |
| January 14, 2001 | Dinesh D'Souza | The Virtue of Prosperity | Prosperity |
| January 21, 2001 | Robert Scigliano | The Federalist Papers | The Federalist Papers |
| January 28, 2001 | Arlen Specter | Passion for Truth | Memoir/Autobiography; Single bullet theory; United States Senate |
| February 4, 2001 and February 11, 2001 | Kurt Eichenwald | The Informant: A True Story | Lysine price-fixing conspiracy; Archer Daniels Midland; Mark Whitacre |
| February 18, 2001 | Maurizio Viroli | Niccolo's Smile: A Biography of Machiavelli | Niccolò Machiavelli |
| February 25, 2001 | Bernard Weisberger | America Afire | 1800 United States presidential election |
| March 4, 2001 | Dick Gregory | Callus on My Soul: A Memoir | Memoir/Autobiography; Civil Rights Movement |
| March 11, 2001 | Jeffrey Meyers | Orwell: Wintry Conscience of a Generation | George Orwell |
| March 18, 2001 | Jason Epstein | Book Business: Publishing—Past, Present, and Future | Publishing |
| March 25, 2001 | Reese Schonfeld | Me and Ted Against the World | History of CNN (1980–2003); Ted Turner |
| April 1, 2001 | Don Hewitt | Tell Me a Story: 50 Years and 60 Minutes in Television | Memoir/Autobiography; CBS News; 60 Minutes |
| April 8, 2001 | William Cooper | Jefferson Davis, American | Jefferson Davis |
| April 15, 2001 | Andrew Burstein | America's Jubilee | 1826 in the United States |
| April 22, 2001 | Emily Bernard | Remember Me to Harlem | Harlem Renaissance; Carl Van Vechten; Langston Hughes |
| April 29, 2001 | Kiron Skinner | Reagan In His Own Hand | Ronald Reagan |
| May 6, 2001 | Susan Dunn and James MacGregor Burns | The Three Roosevelts: Patrician Leaders Who Transformed America | Theodore Roosevelt; Franklin D. Roosevelt; Eleanor Roosevelt |
| May 13, 2001 | Robert Slayton | Empire Statesman: The Rise & Redemption of Al Smith | Al Smith |
| May 20, 2001 | John Farrell | Tip O'Neill and the Democratic Century | Tip O'Neill |
| May 27, 2001 | Diane McWhorter | Carry Me Home: Birmingham, Alabama - The Climactic Battle of the Civil Rights Revolution | Birmingham campaign; 16th Street Baptist Church bombing |
| June 3, 2001 | Rick Perlstein | Before the Storm: Barry Goldwater and the Unmaking of the American Consensus | Barry Goldwater |
| June 10, 2001 | Morton Kondracke | Saving Milly: Love, Politics, and Parkinson's Disease | Parkinson's disease |
| June 17, 2001 | Edward Said | Reflections on Exile and Other Essays | Essays; Literary criticism; Palestine |
| June 24, 2001 | Alma Guillermoprieto | Looking for History: Dispatches from Latin America | Latin America |
| July 1, 2001 | Daniel Schorr | Staying Tuned: A Life in Journalism | Memoir/Autobiography; Journalism |
| July 8, 2001 | Alan Ebenstein | Friedrich Hayek: A Biography | Friedrich Hayek |
| July 15, 2001 | Sally Satel | PC, M.D.: How Political Correctness is Corrupting Medicine | Political correctness; Medicine |
| July 22, 2001 | Jeff Greenfield | Oh, Waiter! One Order of Crow: Inside the Strangest Presidential Election Finish in American History | 2000 United States presidential election |
| July 29, 2001 | Jay Winik | April 1865: The Month That Saved America | Conclusion of the American Civil War |
| August 5, 2001 | Tom Philpott | Glory Denied: The Saga of Jim Thompson, America's Longest-Held Prisoner of War | Floyd James Thompson |
| August 12, 2001 | Roger Wilkins | Jefferson's Pillow: The Founding Fathers and the Dilemma of Black Patriotism | George Washington; Thomas Jefferson; James Madison; George Mason |
| August 19, 2001 | Walter Berns | Making Patriots | American nationalism; Patriotism |
| August 26, 2001 | Thomas Fleming | The New Dealers' War | Franklin Roosevelt; Military history of the United States during World War II |
| September 2, 2001 | Herbert Bix | Hirohito and the Making of Modern Japan | Hirohito; Shōwa period |
| September 9, 2001 | Irvin Molotsky | The Flag, The Poet and The Song | Flag of the United States; The Star-Spangled Banner; Francis Scott Key |
| September 16, 2001 (Open phones) | James Bamford and Jeffrey Richelson | Body of Secrets; The Wizards of Langley | The Central Intelligence Agency; The National Security Agency; United States Intelligence Community. (Note: This interview, the first one after the September 11 attacks, was aired live and featured viewer calls. It is also the only Booknotes to feature two different authors discussing their own separate books.) |
| September 23, 2001 (Open phones) | John Steele Gordon | The Business of America | Economy of the United States; Economic history of the United States; Business. (Note: This interview, the second one after the September 11 attacks, was aired live and featured viewer calls.) |
| September 30, 2001 | Hampton Sides | Ghost Soldiers: The Forgotten Epic Story of World War II's Most Dramatic Mission | Battle of Bataan; Raid at Cabanatuan |
| October 7, 2001 | Midge Decter | An Old Wife’s Tale: My Seven Decades in Love and War | Memoir/Autobiography; History of women in the United States |
| October 14, 2001 | Fran Grace | Carry A. Nation: Retelling the Life | Carry Nation |
| October 21, 2001 | Stephen Kinzer | Crescent & Star: Turkey Between Two Worlds | Turkey |
| October 28, 2001 | Ted Yeatman | Frank and Jesse James: The Story Behind the Legend | Frank James; Jesse James; James-Younger Gang |
| November 4, 2001 | Michael Eric Dyson | Holler If You Hear Me: Searching for Tupac Shakur | Tupac Shakur |
| November 11, 2001 | Joseph Persico | Roosevelt’s Secret War: FDR and World War II Espionage | Franklin D. Roosevelt; Office of Strategic Services; Category:World War II espionage |
| November 18, 2001 | Daniel Pink | Free Agent Nation: How America’s New Independent Workers are Transforming the Way We Live | Employment; Multiple careers |
| November 25, 2001 | Kirkpatrick Sale | The Fire of His Genius: Robert Fulton and the American Dream | Robert Fulton |
| December 2, 2001 | Laura Claridge | Norman Rockwell: A Life | Norman Rockwell |
| December 9, 2001 | Phyllis Lee Levin | Edith and Woodrow: The Wilson White House | Woodrow Wilson; Edith Wilson |
| December 16, 2001 | Peter Bergen | Holy War, Inc.: Inside the Secret World of Osama bin Laden | Osama bin Laden |
| December 23, 2001 | Vernon Jordan | Vernon Can Read! A Memoir | Memoir/Autobiography; Civil Rights Movement |
| December 30, 2001 | Bernard Lewis | What Went Wrong? Western Impact and Middle Eastern Response | Muslim world |
