= List of Booknotes interviews first aired in 1996 =

Booknotes is an American television series on the C-SPAN network hosted by Brian Lamb, which originally aired from 1989 to 2004. The format of the show is a one-hour, one-on-one interview with a non-fiction author. The series was broadcast at 8 p.m. Eastern Time each Sunday night, and was the longest-running author interview program in U.S. broadcast history.

First broadcast (with link to transcript / video)	Author	Book	Subject matter
January 7, 1996	Colin Powell	My American Journey	Memoir/Autobiography; The United States Army
January 14, 1996	William Prochnau	Once Upon a Distant War	The Vietnam War
January 21, 1996	Michael Kinsley	Big Babies	Populism
January 28, 1996	Carlo D'Este	Patton: A Genius for War	George Patton
February 4, 1996	Dennis Prager	Think a Second Time	Essays; Journalism
February 11, 1996	Lance Banning	The Sacred Fire of Liberty: James Madison and the Founding of the Federal Republic	James Madison
February 18, 1996	Dan Balz and Ronald Brownstein	Storming the Gates: Protest Politics and the Republican Revival	The Republican Revolution
February 25, 1996	H. W. Brands	The Reckless Decade: America in the 1890s	Category:1890s in the United States
March 3, 1996	Hillary Clinton	It Takes a Village: And Other Lessons Children Teach Us	American family structure
March 10, 1996	Johanna Neuman	Lights, Camera, War: Is Media Technology Driving International Politics?	International relations
March 17, 1996	Clarence Page	Showing My Color: Impolite Essays on Race and Identity	Essays; Race in the United States
March 24, 1996	Robert W. Merry	Taking on the World: Joseph and Stewart Alsop—Guardians of the American Century	Joseph Alsop; Stewart Alsop
March 31, 1996	Fox Butterfield	All God's Children: The Bosket Family and the American Tradition of Violence	Willie Bosket; Category:Violence in the United States
April 7, 1996	Jean Baker	The Stevensons: A Biography of an American Family	Stevenson family
April 14, 1996	Wayne Fields	Union of Words: A History of Presidential Eloquence	Category:United States presidential speeches
April 21, 1996	Robert Kaplan	The Ends of the Earth: A Journey at the Dawn of the 21st Century	Economic inequality; World distribution of wealth
April 28, 1996	David Reynolds	Walt Whitman's America: A Cultural Biography	Walt Whitman
May 5, 1996	David Broder and Haynes Johnson	The System: The American Way of Politics at the Breaking Point	Politics of the United States; Clinton health care plan of 1993
May 12, 1996	Stanley Crouch	The All-American Skin Game, or the Decoy of Race: The Long and the Short of it, 1990-1994	Essays; Race in the United States
May 19, 1996	Michael Sandel	Democracy's Discontent: America in Search of a Public Philosophy	Political philosophy
May 26, 1996	Noa Ben Artzi-Pelossof	In the Name of Sorrow and Hope	Yitzhak Rabin
June 2, 1996	James Thomas Flexner	Maverick's Progress: An Autobiography	Memoir/Autobiography; Historians; George Washington
June 9, 1996	Christopher Matthews	Kennedy and Nixon: The Rivalry That Shaped Postwar America	John F. Kennedy and Richard Nixon
June 16, 1996	Albert Murray	Blue Devils of Nada: A Contemporary American Approach to Aesthetic Statement	Jazz; Creativity in art; Aesthetics and the philosophy of art
June 23, 1996	Seymour Martin Lipset	American Exceptionalism: A Double-Edged Sword	American exceptionalism
June 30, 1996	Glenn Simpson	Dirty Little Secrets: The Persistence of Corruption in American Politics	Category:Political corruption in the United States
July 7, 1996	Paul Greenberg	No Surprises: Two Decades of Clinton Watching	Bill Clinton
July 14, 1996	Ted Sorensen	Why I Am a Democrat	Memoir/Autobiography; Democratic Party (United States)
July 21, 1996	Eleanor Randolph	Waking the Tempests: Ordinary Life in the New Russia	Russia
July 28, 1996	James Lardner	Crusader: The Hell-Raising Police Career of Detective David Durk	David Durk; The New York Police Department
August 4, 1996	Denis Brian	Einstein: A Life	Albert Einstein
August 25, 1996	Eleanor Clift and Tom Brazaitis	War Without Bloodshed: The Art of Politics	Newt Gingrich; Stanley Greenberg; Frank Luntz; Daniel Patrick Moynihan; Sheila Burke; Maxine Waters
September 1, 1996	Drew Gilpin Faust	Mothers of Invention: Women of the Slaveholding South in the American Civil War	Confederate States of America; History of women in the United States
September 8, 1996	Donald Warren	Radio Priest: Charles Coughlin, the Father of Hate Radio	Charles Coughlin
September 15, 1996	Lloyd Kramer	Lafayette in Two Worlds: Public Cultures and Personal Identities in an Age of Revolutions	Marquis de Lafayette
September 22, 1996	Michael Elliott	The Day Before Yesterday: Reconsidering America's Past, Rediscovering the Present	Nostalgia; Category:1940s in the United States; Category:1950s in the United States
September 29, 1996	Monica Crowley	Nixon off the Record: His Commentary on People and Politics	Richard Nixon
October 13, 1996	Louise Barnett	Touched by Fire: The Life, Death, and Mythic Afterlife of George Armstrong Custer	George Armstrong Custer
October 20, 1996	David Friedman	Hidden Order: The Economics of Everyday Life	Economics
October 27, 1996	Paul Hendrickson	The Living and the Dead: Robert McNamara and Five Lives of a Lost War	Robert McNamara; The Vietnam War
November 3, 1996	Andrew Ferguson	Fools' Names, Fools' Faces	Essays; Politics of the United States
November 10, 1996	Leon Dash	Rosa Lee: A Mother and Her Family in Urban America	Poverty in the United States
November 17, 1996	Conor Cruise O'Brien	The Long Affair: Thomas Jefferson and the French Revolution, 1785-1800	Thomas Jefferson; The French Revolution
November 24, 1996	Mikhail Gorbachev	Memoirs	Memoir/Autobiography; The Soviet Union
December 1, 1996	Robert Bork	Slouching Towards Gomorrah: Modern Liberalism and American Decline	New Left
December 8, 1996	Nell Irvin Painter	Sojourner Truth: A Life, A Symbol	Sojourner Truth
December 15, 1996	President Bill Clinton	Between Hope and History: Meeting America's Challenges for the 21st Century	Memoir/Autobiography; The President of the United States
December 22, 1996	David Denby	Great Books: My Adventures with Homer, Rousseau, Woolf and Other Indestructible Writers of the Western World	Western canon; Homer; Rousseau; Virginia Woolf
December 29, 1996	Stanley Wolpert	Nehru: A Tryst with Destiny	Jawaharlal Nehru
