= List of Booknotes interviews first aired in 1990 =

Booknotes is an American television series on the C-SPAN network hosted by Brian Lamb, which originally aired from 1989 to 2004. The format of the show is a one-hour, one-on-one interview with a non-fiction author. The series was broadcast at 8 p.m. Eastern Time each Sunday night, and was the longest-running author interview program in U.S. broadcast history.

First broadcast (with link to transcript / video)	Author	Book	Subject matter
January 7, 1990	Sig Mickelson	From Whistle Stop to Sound Bite	Memoir/Autobiography; Journalism; CBS News
January 14, 1990	John Barry	The Ambition and the Power	Jim Wright; Newt Gingrich
January 21, 1990	Fitzhugh Green	George Bush: An Intimate Portrait	George H. W. Bush
January 28, 1990	Charles Fecher	The Diary of H. L. Mencken	H. L. Mencken
February 4, 1990	Jim Mann	Beijing Jeep: American Business in China	Jeep Cherokee (XJ); Automobile industry in China; U.S.-China economic relations
February 11, 1990	David Burnham	A Law Unto Itself: Power, Politics and the IRS	the Internal Revenue Service
February 18, 1990	Peggy Noonan	What I Saw at the Revolution	Ronald Reagan; Reagan Administration
February 25, 1990	Michael Fumento	The Myth of Heterosexual AIDS	AIDS
February 27, 1990	Hedley Donovan	Right Places, Right Times	Memoir/Autobiography; Journalism; Time Magazine
March 4, 1990	Richard Barnet	The Rockets' Red Glare: When America Goes to War—The Presidents and the People	Military history of the United States; Home front; United States home front during World War II
March 11, 1990	Frederick Kempe	Divorcing the Dictator: America's Bungled Affairs with Noriega	Manuel Noriega; United States invasion of Panama
March 18, 1990	David Halevy	Inside the PLO	The Palestine Liberation Organization
March 25, 1990	James Abourezk	Advise and Dissent: Memoirs of South Dakota and the U.S. Senate	Memoir/Autobiography; The United States Senate; South Dakota
April 1, 1990	Fred Graham	Happy Talk: Confessions of a TV Newsman	Memoir/Autobiography; Journalism; CBS News
April 8, 1990	Leonard Sussman	Power, The Press and The Technology of Freedom	History of the World Wide Web; Integrated Services Digital Network
April 15, 1990	Helmut Schmidt	Men and Powers: A Political Retrospective	Memoir/Autobiography; West Germany
April 22, 1990	Michael Barone	Our Country: The Shaping of America from Roosevelt to Reagan	History of the United States (1918–1945); History of the United States (1945–1964); History of the United States (1964–1980); History of the United States (1980–1991)
April 29, 1990	Robert Caro	Means of Ascent	Lyndon Johnson
May 6, 1990	Morley Safer	Flashbacks on Returning to Vietnam	Memoir/Autobiography; Journalism; Aftermath of the Vietnam War
May 13, 1990	Brian Duffy and Steven Emerson	The Fall of Pan Am 103: Inside the Lockerbie Investigation	Pan Am Flight 103
May 20, 1990	Allister Sparks	The Mind of South Africa	South Africa
May 27, 1990	Bette Bao Lord	Legacies: A Chinese Mosaic	Memoir/Autobiography; Tiananmen Square protests of 1989; Television in the People's Republic of China
June 3, 1990	Dusko Doder	Gorbachev: Heretic in the Kremlin	Mikhail Gorbachev
June 10, 1990	Thomas Sowell	Preferential Policies: An International Perspective	Affirmative action; Reverse discrimination
June 17, 1990	Judith Miller	One, By One, By One: Facing the Holocaust	Aftermath of the Holocaust; Holocaust historiography; Holocaust commemoration
June 24, 1990	Kevin Phillips	The Politics of Rich and Poor: Wealth and the Electorate in the Reagan Aftermath	Reaganomics
July 1, 1990	Chris Ogden	Maggie: An Intimate Portrait of a Woman in Power	Margaret Thatcher
July 8, 1990	Denton Watson	Lion in the Lobby: Clarence Mitchell Jr.'s Struggle for the Passage of Civil Rights Laws	Clarence M. Mitchell, Jr.
July 15, 1990	Caspar Weinberger	Fighting for Peace: Seven Critical Years in the Pentagon	Memoir/Autobiography; Reagan Administration; U.S. Department of Defense
July 22, 1990	Teresa Odendahl	Charity Begins at Home: Generosity and Self-Interest Among the Philanthropic Elite	Philanthropy in the United States
July 29, 1990	Michael Shapiro	In the Shadow of the Sun: A Korean Year of Love and Sorrow	Memoir/Autobiography; Economy of South Korea
August 5, 1990	Dan Raviv and Yossi Melman	Every Spy a Prince	Israeli Intelligence Community
August 12, 1990	Roger Kimball	Tenured Radicals	Modern liberalism in the United States; Higher education in the United States; Tenure
August 19, 1990	Tad Szulc	Then and Now: How the World Has Changed Since WWII	Aftermath of World War II; 1940s; 1950s; 1960s; 1970s; 1980s
August 26, 1990	Christopher Wren	The End of the Line: The Failure of Communism in the Soviet Union and China	Communism; The Soviet Union; China
September 2, 1990	Lee Edwards	Missionary for Freedom: The Life and Times of Walter Judd	Walter Judd
September 9, 1990	Robert Dole	Historical Almanac of the United States Senate	History of the United States Senate
September 16, 1990	M.A. Farber	Outrage: The Story Behind the Tawana Brawley Hoax	Tawana Brawley rape allegations
September 23, 1990	Jannette Dates	Split Image: African Americans in the Mass Media	Representation of African-Americans in media
October 14, 1990	Harold Stassen	Eisenhower: Turning the World Toward Peace	Dwight D. Eisenhower
October 21, 1990	Tim Weiner	Blank Check: The Pentagon's Black Budget	Military budget of the United States
October 28, 1990	Pat Choate	Agents of Influence: How Japan's Lobbyists in the United States Manipulate America's Political and Economic System	Lobbying in the United States; Japan – United States relations
November 4, 1990	Paul Taylor	See How They Run: Electing a President in an Age of Mediaocracy	1988 United States presidential election
November 11, 1990	Blaine Harden	Africa: Dispatches From a Fragile Continent	Africa
November 18, 1990	Jean Edward Smith	Lucius D. Clay: An American Life	Lucius D. Clay
November 25, 1990	Martin Mayer	The Greatest Ever Bank Robbery: The Collapse of the Savings and Loan Industry	Savings and loan crisis
December 2, 1990	Cpt. Carol Barkalow	In the Men's House	Memoir/Autobiography; Women in the military; United States Military Academy
December 9, 1990	Sally Bedell Smith	In All His Glory	William S. Paley
December 16, 1990	Shen Tong	Almost a Revolution	Tiananmen Square protests of 1989
December 23, 1990	John Wallach and Janet Wallach	Arafat: In the Eyes of the Beholder	Yasser Arafat
December 30, 1990	Garry Wills	Under God: Religion and American Politics	Religion and politics in the United States
