= List of Booknotes interviews first aired in 1991 =

Booknotes is an American television series on the C-SPAN network hosted by Brian Lamb, which originally aired from 1989 to 2004. The format of the show is a one-hour, one-on-one interview with a non-fiction author. The series was broadcast at 8 p.m. Eastern Time each Sunday night, and was the longest-running author interview program in U.S. broadcast history.

First broadcast (with link to transcript / video)	Author	Book	Subject matter
January 6, 1991	Ben Wattenberg	The First Universal Nation	Memoir/Autobiography; The United States of America
January 13, 1991	Daniel Roos	The Machine That Changed the World	The Automobile; Alfred P. Sloan; General Motors; The Ford Motor Company; Toyota
January 27, 1991	Daniel Yergin	The Prize: The Epic Quest for Oil, Money and Power	The Petroleum industry
February 3, 1991	Carl Rowan	Breaking Barriers	Memoir/Autobiography; Race in the United States
February 10, 1991	Father Theodore Hesburgh	God, Country, Notre Dame	Memoir/Autobiography; The University of Notre Dame
February 17, 1991	Ronald Brownstein	The Power and the Glitter: The Hollywood–Washington Connection	Cinema of the United States; Motion Picture Association of America; Lobbying in the United States
February 24, 1991	Robert Kuttner	The End of Laissez-Faire	Ronald Reagan; History of the United States (1980–1991)
March 3, 1991	Haynes Johnson	Sleepwalking Through History: America in the Reagan Years	Ronald Reagan; History of the United States (1980–1991)
March 10, 1991	Georgie Anne Geyer	Guerrilla Prince	Fidel Castro
March 17, 1991	Leonard Goldenson	Beating the Odds	American Broadcasting Company
March 24, 1991	Richard Brookhiser	The Way of the WASP: How It Made America and How It Can Save It... So to Speak	White Anglo-Saxon Protestants
March 31, 1991	Dayton Duncan	Grass Roots: One Year in the Life of the New Hampshire Presidential Primary	New Hampshire primary; Democratic Party (United States) presidential primaries, 1988; Republican Party (United States) presidential primaries, 1988
April 7, 1991	Tom Wicker	One of Us: Richard Nixon and the American Dream	Richard Nixon
April 14, 1991	William Strauss and Neil Howe	Generations: The History of America's Future, 1584–2069	Strauss–Howe generational theory
April 21, 1991	Robert Shogan	The Riddle of Power	Leadership; Powers of the president of the United States; Harry Truman; Dwight Eisenhower; John F. Kennedy Lyndon Johnson; Richard Nixon; Gerald Ford; Jimmy Carter; Ronald Reagan; George H. W. Bush
April 28, 1991	Caroline Kennedy and Ellen Alderman	In Our Defense: The Bill of Rights in Action	United States Bill of Rights
May 5, 1991	Nick Lemann	The Promised Land: The Great Black Migration and How it Changed America	Second Great Migration (African American)
May 12 and May 19, 1991	Lou Cannon	President Reagan: A Role of a Lifetime	Ronald Reagan
May 24, 1991	Lewis Puller Jr.	Fortunate Son: The Autobiography of Lewis Puller, Jr.	Memoir/Autobiography; Chesty Puller; United States Marine Corps; The Vietnam War
May 26, 1991	Robert Reich	The Work of Nations	Globalization; Capitalism
June 2, 1991	Robert Kaiser	Why Gorbachev Happened: His Triumphs and His Failure	Mikhail Gorbachev
June 9, 1991	George Friedman and Merideth LeBard	The Coming War with Japan	Japan – United States relations
June 16, 1991	Dixy Lee Ray	Trashing the Planet: How Science Can Help with Problems Like Acid Rain and Nuclear Waste and Depletion of the Ozone	Environmental skepticism
June 23, 1991	Bob Woodward	The Commanders	The Joint Chiefs of Staff; The Pentagon; United States invasion of Panama; The Gulf War
June 30, 1991	Roger Gittines	Consequences: John G. Tower, A Personal and Political Memoir	John Tower
July 7, 1991	Donald Ritchie	Press Gallery	History of American newspapers
July 14, 1991	Michael Beschloss	The Crisis Years: Kennedy and Khrushchev, 1960–1963	John F. Kennedy; Nikita Khrushchev; The Cold War
July 21, 1991	Alan Ehrenhalt	The United States of Ambition: Politicians, Power and the Pursuit of Office	Politics of the United States
July 28, 1991	Clark Clifford	Counsel to the President: A Memoir	Memoir/Autobiography
August 4, 1991	Elaine Sciolino	The Outlaw State: Saddam Hussein's Quest for Power and the Gulf Crisis	Saddam Hussein; Iraq
August 11, 1991	Len Colodny and Robert Gettlin	Silent Coup: The Removal of a President	Resignation of Richard Nixon; John Dean; Alexander Haig
August 18, 1991	Liz Trotta	Fighting for Air: In the Trenches with Television News	United States television news
August 25, 1991	E.J. Dionne Jr	Why Americans Hate Politics	Politics of the United States
September 1, 1991	Andrew Cockburn and Leslie Cockburn	Dangerous Liaisons	Israeli Intelligence Community
September 8, 1991	Liva Baker	The Justice from Beacon Hill	Oliver Wendell Holmes Jr.
September 15, 1991	Reuven Frank	Out of Thin Air: The Brief Wonderful Life of Network News	United States television news; NBC News
September 22, 1991	Robert Dallek	Lone Star Rising: Lyndon Johnson and His Times 1908–1960	Lyndon Johnson
September 29, 1991	Stephen Carter	Reflections of an Affirmative Action Baby	Affirmative Action
October 6, 1991	Ken Auletta	Three Blind Mice: How the TV Networks Lost Their Way	United States television news
October 20, 1991	Anthony Lewis	Make No Law: The Sullivan Case and the First Amendment	New York Times Co. v. Sullivan; First Amendment to the United States Constitution
October 27, 1991	Don Oberdorfer	The Turn: From the Cold War to a New Era, The United States and the Soviet Union 1983–1990	Soviet Union – United States relations
November 3, 1991	Larry Sabato	Feeding Frenzy: How Attack Journalism has Transformed American Politics	Politics of the United States
November 10, 1991	Tina Rosenberg	Children of Cain: Violence and the Violent in Latin America	Latin America
November 17, 1991	Suzanne Garment	Scandal: The Culture of Mistrust in American Politics	Politics of the United States
November 24, 1991	James Stewart	Den of Thieves	Insider trading
December 1, 1991	Gary Sick	October Surprise: America's Hostages in Iran and the Election of Ronald Reagan	October surprise conspiracy theory
December 8, 1991	James Reston	Deadline: A Memoir	Memoir/Autobiography; The New York Times
December 15, 1991	Thomas Byrne Edsall and Mary Edsall	Chain Reaction: The Impact of Race, Rights, and Taxes on American Politics	Politics of the United States
December 22, 1991	Martin Gilbert	Churchill: A Life	Winston Churchill
December 29, 1991	Jimmy Breslin	Damon Runyon: A Life	Damon Runyon
