= List of Booknotes interviews first aired in 1994 =

Booknotes is an American television series on the C-SPAN network hosted by Brian Lamb, which originally aired from 1989 to 2004. The format of the show is a one-hour, one-on-one interview with a non-fiction author. The series was broadcast at 8 p.m. Eastern Time each Sunday night, and was the longest-running author interview program in U.S. broadcast history.

| First broadcast (with link to transcript / video) | Author | Book | Subject matter |
|---|---|---|---|
| January 2, 1994 | David Levering Lewis | W. E. B. Du Bois: The Biography of a Race, 1868-1919 | W. E. B. Du Bois |
| January 9, 1994 | William Bennett | The Book of Virtues | Virtue |
| January 16, 1994 | Carolyn Barta | Perot and His People: Disrupting the Balance of Political Power | Ross Perot; The Reform Party |
| January 23, 1994 | Gary Hymel and Tip O'Neill | All Politics is Local and other Rules of the Game | Memoir/Autobiography; The U.S. House of Representatives; Politics of Massachusetts |
| January 30, 1994 | William Chafe | Never Stop Running: Allard Lowenstein and the Struggle to Save American Liberalism | Allard Lowenstein |
| February 6, 1994 | Stanley Weintraub | Disraeli: A Biography | Benjamin Disraeli |
| February 13, 1994 | Bill Emmott | Japanophobia: The Myth of the Invincible Japanese | Economy of Japan; Anti-Japanese sentiment |
| February 20, 1994 | Peter Arnett | Live from the Battlefield: From Vietnam to Baghdad, 35 years in the World's War Zones | Memoir/Autobiography; Journalism; The Vietnam War; The Gulf War |
| February 27, 1994 | Stephen Lesher | George Wallace: American Populist | George Wallace |
| March 6, 1994 | Nathan McCall | Makes Me Wanna Holler: A Young Black Man in America | Memoir/Autobiography |
| March 13, 1994 | Norman Ornstein | Debt and Taxes: How America Got into Its Budget Mess and What to Do About It | Taxation in the United States; United States public debt |
| March 20, 1994 | Clare Brandt | The Man in the Mirror: A Life of Benedict Arnold | Benedict Arnold |
| March 27, 1994 | John Corry | My Times: Adventures in the News Trade | Memoir/Autobiography; The New York Times |
| April 3, 1994 | Andrew Young | A Way Out of No Way: The Spiritual Memoirs of Andrew Young | Memoir/Autobiography; Civil Rights Movement |
| April 10, 1994 | Fifth Anniversary Special | N/A | Excerpts from and interviews about the first five years of Booknotes |
| April 17, 1994 | James Cannon | Time and Change: Gerald Ford's Appointment with History | Gerald Ford |
| May 1, 1994 | Howell Raines | Fly Fishing Through the Mid Life Crisis | Memoir/Autobiography; Journalism |
| May 8, 1994 | John Keegan | A History of Warfare | Warfare |
| May 15, 1994 | Forrest McDonald | The American Presidency: An Intellectual History | President of the United States |
| May 22, 1994 | James McPherson | What They Fought For, 1861-1865 | American Civil War |
| May 29, 1994 | Pete Hamill | A Drinking Life: A Memoir | Memoir/Autobiography; Journalism |
| June 5, 1994 | Stephen Ambrose | D-Day: June 6, 1944—The Climactic Battle of World War II | Operation Overlord |
| June 12, 1994 | Mark E. Neely Jr. | The Last Best Hope of Earth: Abraham Lincoln and the Promise of America | Abraham Lincoln |
| June 19, 1994 | Sam Roberts | Who We Are: A Portrait of America | Demographics of the United States; 1990 United States census |
| June 26, 1994 | Lani Guinier | The Tyranny of the Majority: Fundamental Fairness in Representative Democracy | Racism in the United States |
| July 3, 1994 | Murray Kempton | Rebellions, Perversities, and Main Events | History of the United States; Paul Robeson; Cassius Clay; A. Philip Randolph; Karl Marx; Ronald Reagan; Westbrook Pegler; Alger Hiss; H.L. Mencken; Whittaker Chambers |
| July 10, 1994 | Cal Thomas | The Things That Matter Most | Modern liberalism in the United States; Criticism of the war on poverty |
| July 17, 1994 | David Hackett Fischer | Paul Revere's Ride | Paul Revere; "Paul Revere's Ride" |
| July 24, 1994 | Dan Quayle | Standing Firm | Memoir/Autobiography; The Vice President of the United States; George H. W. Bush |
| July 31, 1994 | Colman McCarthy | All of One Peace: Essays on Nonviolence | Nonviolence; Pacifism |
| August 7, 1994 | Peter Collier | The Roosevelts: An American Saga | Roosevelt family |
| August 14, 1994 | Merrill Peterson | Lincoln in American Memory | Abraham Lincoln; Cultural depictions of Abraham Lincoln |
| August 21, 1994 | Hugh Pearson | The Shadow of the Panther: Huey Newton and the Price of Black Power in America | Huey Newton; The Black Panthers |
| August 28, 1994 | John Leo | Two Steps Ahead of the Thought Police | Political correctness |
| September 4, 1994 | Paul Weaver | News and the Culture of Lying | Journalism; Pseudo-events |
| September 11, 1994 | Shelby Foote | Stars in Their Courses: The Gettysburg Campaign | American Civil War |
| September 18, 1994 | Irving Bartlett | John C. Calhoun: A Biography | John Calhoun |
| September 25, 1994 | Ben Yagoda | Will Rogers: A Biography | Will Rogers |
| October 2, 1994 | Harry Jaffe and Tom Sherwood | Dream City: Race, Power, and the Decline of Washington, D.C. | Washington, D.C. |
| October 9, 1994 | Henry Louis Gates Jr. | Colored People | African-American history; African Americans in the 1960s |
| October 16, 1994 | Nicholas Kristof and Sheryl WuDunn | China Wakes: The Struggle for the Soul of a Rising Power | China |
| October 23, 1994 | Liz Carpenter | Unplanned Parenthood | Parenting; Old age; Lady Bird Johnson |
| October 30, 1994 | David Frum | Dead Right | Republican Party (United States) |
| November 6, 1994 | Bill Thomas | Club Fed: Power, Money, Sex and Violence on Capitol Hill | Political power; Capitol Hill |
| November 13, 1994 | John Kenneth Galbraith | A Journey Through Economic Time | Economics |
| November 20, 1994 | Milton Friedman | Introduction to the 50th anniversary edition of F.A. Hayek's Road to Serfdom | Economics; Classical liberalism |
| November 27, 1994 | Melba Pattillo Beals | Warriors Don't Cry: A Searing Memoir of the Battle to Integrate Little Rock's Central High | Memoir/Autobiography; Little Rock Central High School; Little Rock Nine |
| December 4, 1994 | Charles Murray | The Bell Curve: Intelligence and Class Structure in American Life | Intelligence; Race and intelligence |
| December 11, 1994 | Elizabeth Drew | On The Edge: The Clinton Presidency | Bill Clinton; Presidency of Bill Clinton |
| December 18, 1994 | Peter Robinson | Snapshots From Hell: The Making of an MBA | Stanford Graduate School of Business |
| December 25, 1994 | Glenn Frankel | Beyond the Promised Land: Jews and Arabs on a Hard Road to a New Israel | Israel; Israeli–Palestinian conflict |
