= List of Booknotes interviews first aired in 1997 =

Booknotes is an American television series on the C-SPAN network hosted by Brian Lamb, which originally aired from 1989 to 2004. The format of the show is a one-hour, one-on-one interview with a non-fiction author. The series was broadcast at 8 p.m. Eastern Time each Sunday night, and was the longest-running author interview program in U.S. broadcast history.

First broadcast (with link to transcript / video)	Author	Book	Subject matter
January 5, 1997	Edward Jay Epstein	Dossier: The Secret History of Armand Hammer	Armand Hammer
January 12, 1997	Robert Ferrell	The Strange Deaths of President Harding	Warren G. Harding
January 19, 1997	Alfred Zacher	Trial and Triumph: Presidential Power in the Second Term	President of the United States
January 23, 1997	Anita Hill	Speaking Truth to Power	Memoir/Autobiography; Clarence Thomas Supreme Court nomination
January 26, 1997	David Boaz	Libertarianism: A Primer	Libertarianism
February 2, 1997	Henry Grunwald	One Man's America: A Journalist's Search for the Heart of His Country	Memoir/Autobiography; Journalism; Time Magazine
February 9, 1997	John Brady	Bad Boy: The Life and Politics of Lee Atwater	Lee Atwater
February 16, 1997	Katharine Graham	Personal History	Memoir/Autobiography; The Washington Post; The Washington Post Company
February 23, 1997 and March 2, 1997	Sam Tanenhaus	Whittaker Chambers: A Biography	Whittaker Chambers
March 9, 1997	Sarah Gordon	Passage to Union: How the Railroads Transformed American Life, 1829-1929	History of rail transport in North America
March 16, 1997	John Fialka	War By Other Means: Economic Espionage in America	Industrial espionage
March 23, 1997	Jon Katz	Virtuous Reality: How America Surrendered Discussion of Moral Values to Opportunists, Nitwits & Blockheads Like William Bennett	William Bennett
March 30, 1997	Claude Andrew Clegg III	An Original Man: The Life and Times of Elijah Muhammad	Elijah Muhammad
April 6, 1997	Keith Richburg	Out of America: A Black Man Confronts Africa	Africa
April 13, 1997	David Horowitz	Radical Son: A Generational Odyssey	Memoir/Autobiography; American Left
April 20, 1997	Leonard Garment	Crazy Rhythm: My Journey From Brooklyn, Jazz, and Wall Street, to Nixon's White House, Watergate and Beyond	Memoir/Autobiography; Billie Holiday Category:Presidency of Richard Nixon
April 27, 1997	Stephen Oates	The Approaching Fury: Voices of the Storm, 1820-1861	Origins of the American Civil War
May 4, 1997	Christopher Buckley	Wry Martinis	Essays
May 11, 1997	Richard Bernstein and Ross H. Munro	The Coming Conflict with China	Sino-American relations
May 18, 1997	Anne Matthews	Bright College Years: Inside the American Campus Today	Higher education in the United States
May 25, 1997	Jane Holtz Kay	Asphalt Nation: How the Automobile Took Over America and How We Can Take It Back	Automotive industry in the United States
June 1, 1997	Jill Krementz	The Writer's Desk	Creative writing; Kurt Vonnegut
June 8, 1997	Pavel Palazchenko	My Years With Gorbachev and Shevardnadze: The Memoir of a Soviet Interpreter	Memoir/Autobiography; Mikhail Gorbachev; Eduard Shevardnadze
June 15, 1997	Walter A. McDougall	Promised Land, Crusader State: The American Encounter with the World Since 1776	Foreign policy of the United States
June 22, 1997	James Humes	Confessions of a White House Ghostwriter: Five Presidents and other Political Adventures	Memoir/Autobiography; Speechwriting
June 29, 1997	Walter Cronkite	A Reporter's Life	Memoir/Autobiography; Journalism; CBS News
July 6, 1997	Jack Rakove	Original Meanings: Politics and Ideas in the Making of the Constitution	The U.S. Constitution
July 13, 1997	Tom Clancy and Gen. Fred Franks	Into the Storm: A Study in Command	General officers in the United States; General (United States)
July 20, 1997	Robert Hughes	American Visions: The Epic History of Art in America	Visual art of the United States
July 27, 1997	Sylvia Jukes Morris	Rage for Fame: The Ascent of Clare Boothe Luce	Clare Boothe Luce
August 3, 1997	LeAlan Jones	Our America: Life and Death on the South Side of Chicago	Ghetto Life 101; Ida B. Wells Homes
August 10, 1997	James Tobin	Ernie Pyle's War: America's Eyewitness to World War II	Ernie Pyle
August 17, 1997	Pauline Maier	American Scripture: Making the Declaration of Independence	The United States Declaration of Independence
August 24, 1997	Peter Maas	Underboss: Sammy The Bull Gravano's Story of Life in the Mafia	Sammy "The Bull" Gravano
August 28, 1997	John Berendt	Midnight in the Garden of Good and Evil: A Savannah Story	Savannah, Georgia; Jim Williams
August 31, 1997	Frank McCourt	Angela's Ashes	Memoir/Autobiography; Limerick, Ireland; Brooklyn, New York; Irish Americans; Malachy McCourt; Alphie McCourt
September 7, 1997	Brian Burrell	The Words We Live By: The Creeds, Mottoes, and Pledges That Have Shaped America	Creeds; Mottoes; Oaths; The Pledge of Allegiance; "In God We Trust"
September 14, 1997	John Toland	Captured By History: One Man's Vision of Our Tumultuous Century	20th century
September 21, 1997	Peter Gomes	The Good Book: Reading the Bible with Mind and Heart	The Bible
October 5, 1997	Howard Gardner	Extraordinary Minds: Portraits of Four Exceptional Individuals and an Examination of Our Own Extraordinariness	Wolfgang Amadeus Mozart; Sigmund Freud; Virginia Woolf; Mahatma Gandhi
October 12, 1997	Geoffrey Perret	Ulysses S. Grant: Soldier & President	Ulysses S. Grant
October 19, 1997	Nat Hentoff	Speaking Freely: A Memoir	Memoir/Autobiography; First Amendment; Jazz
October 26, 1997	Alan Schom	Napoleon Bonaparte	Napoleon Bonaparte
November 2, 1997	Thomas West	Vindicating the Founders: Race, Sex, Class and Justice in the Origins of America	Founding Fathers of the United States
November 16, 1997	David Gelernter	Drawing Life: Surviving the Unabomber	The Unabomber
November 30, 1997	Jeff Shesol	Mutual Contempt: Lyndon Johnson, Robert Kennedy, and the Feud that Defined a Decade	Lyndon Johnson; Robert F. Kennedy
December 7, 1997	Tim Russert	Meet the Press: 50 Years of History in the Making	Meet the Press
December 14, 1997	Susan Butler	East to the Dawn: The Life of Amelia Earhart	Amelia Earhart
December 21, 1997	Jim Hightower	There's Nothing in the Middle of the Road But Yellow Stripes and Dead Armadillos	Progressivism in the United States
December 28, 1997	Sally Quinn	The Party: A Guide to Adventurous Entertaining	Dinner parties
