= List of Booknotes interviews first aired in 1989 =

Booknotes is an American television series on the C-SPAN network hosted by Brian Lamb. It originally aired from 1989 to 2004. The format of the show is a one-hour, one-on-one interview with a non-fiction author. The series was broadcast at 8 p.m. Eastern Time each Sunday night, and was the longest-running author interview program in U.S. broadcast history.

First broadcast (with link to transcript / video)	Author	Book	Subject matter
April 2, 1989	Zbigniew Brzezinski	The Grand Failure: The Birth and Death of Communism in the 20th Century	Communism
April 9, 1989	Judy Shelton	The Coming Soviet Crash: Gorbachev's Desperate Pursuit of Credit in Western Financial Markets	The Economy of the Soviet Union
April 16, 1989	Bruce Oudes	From: The President—Richard Nixon's Secret Files	Richard Nixon
April 23, 1989	Susan Moeller	Shooting War: Photography and the American Experience of Combat	War photography
April 30, 1989	Henry Brandon	Special Relationships: A Foreign Correspondent's Memoirs	Memoir/Autobiography; Journalism
May 7, 1989	Col. David Hackworth	About Face: The Odyssey of an American Warrior	Memoir/Autobiography; The Vietnam War
May 14, 1989	James Fallows	More Like Us: Making America Great Again	Japan – United States relations; Economy of Japan
May 21, 1989	Gregory Fossedal	The Democratic Imperative: Exporting the American Revolution	Democracy promotion
May 28, 1989	Stanley Karnow	In Our Image: America's Empire in the Philippines	Philippine–American War
June 4, 1989	James MacGregor Burns	The Crosswinds of Freedom	History of the United States (1918–1945); History of the United States (1945–1964); History of the United States (1964–1980); History of the United States (1980–1991)
June 11, 1989	Robert Christopher	Crashing the Gates: The De-WASPing of America's Power Elite	White Anglo-Saxon Protestants; Elitism
June 18, 1989	Sen. Robert Byrd	The Senate: 1789-1989	History of the United States Senate
June 25, 1989	Elizabeth Colton	The Jackson Phenomenon: The Man, The Power, The Message	Jesse Jackson
July 2, 1989	Nathaniel Branden	Judgment Day: My Years with Ayn Rand	Ayn Rand
July 9, 1989	Roger Kennedy	Orders From France: The Americans and the French in a Revolutionary World (1780–1820)	The French Revolution; The U.S. Constitution; France – United States relations
July 14, 1989	Simon Schama	Citizens: A Chronicle of the French Revolution	The French Revolution
July 16, 1989	George Wilson	Mud Soldiers: Life Inside the New American Army	The United States Army; Category:United States Army education
July 23, 1989	Jeanne Simon	Codename: Scarlett—Life on the Campaign Trail by the Wife of a Presidential Candidate	Senator Paul Simon; Democratic Party (United States) presidential primaries, 1988
July 30, 1989	Michael Kaufman	Mad Dreams, Saving Graces: Poland—A Nation in Conspiracy	Poland; History of Poland (1945–1989)
August 6, 1989	Porter McKeever	Adlai Stevenson: His Life and Legacy	Adlai Stevenson
August 13, 1989	Bob Schieffer and Gary Paul Gates	The Acting President	Ronald Reagan
August 20, 1989	Bruce Murray	Journey Into Space: The First Thirty Years of Space Exploration	Space exploration; NASA; Space advocacy
August 27, 1989	Jack Germond and Jules Witcover	Whose Broad Stripes and Bright Stars? The Trivial Pursuit of the Presidency 1988	1988 United States presidential election
September 3, 1989	Walter Laqueur	The Long Road to Freedom: Russia and Glasnost	Glasnost
September 10, 1989	Thomas Friedman	From Beirut to Jerusalem	Journalism; Middle East
September 17, 1989	Gen. Ariel Sharon	Warrior: An Autobiography	Memoir/Autobiography; History of the Israel Defense Forces
September 24, 1989	George Gilder	Microcosm: The Quantum Revolution in Economics and Technology	Quantum mechanics; Microtechnology
October 1, 1989	Mort Rosenblum	Back Home: A Foreign Correspondent Rediscovers America	Memoir/Autobiography; Journalism
October 8, 1989	Barbara Ehrenreich	Fear of Falling: The Inner Life of the Middle Class	American middle class
October 15, 1989	Harrison Salisbury	Tiananmen Diary: Thirteen Days in June	The Tiananmen Square protests of 1989
October 22, 1989	Kenneth Adelman	The Great Universal Embrace, Arms Summitry—A Skeptic's Account	Arms Control and Disarmament Agency; Geneva Summit (1985); Reykjavík Summit; Intermediate-Range Nuclear Forces Treaty
October 29, 1989	Rev. Ralph David Abernathy	And the Walls Came Tumbling Down	Memoir/Autobiography; Civil Rights Movement
November 5, 1989	Vassily Aksyonov	Say Cheese	Say Cheese is one of the only novels ever featured on Booknotes.
November 12, 1989	Felix Rodriguez	Shadow Warrior	Memoir/Autobiography; The Central Intelligence Agency
November 19, 1989	Robin Wright	In the Name of God: The Khomeini Decade	The Ayatollah Khomeini
November 26, 1989	Peter Hennessy	Whitehall	Her Majesty's Government; Whitehall
December 3, 1989	Clifford Stoll	The Cuckoo's Egg	Security cracking; Markus Hess
December 10, 1989	Arthur Grace	Choose Me: Portraits of a Presidential Race	Photojournalism; 1988 United States presidential election
December 17, 1989	James Reston Jr.	The Lone Star: The Life of John Connally	John Connally
December 24, 1989	Richard Rhodes	Farm: A Year in the Life of an American Farmer	Agriculture in the United States; Family farms
December 31, 1989	William D. Lutz	Doublespeak	Doublespeak
