= Susan Butler (American writer) =

American journalist and biographer

Susan Butler (born 1932) is an American journalist and biographer, best known as a biographer of Amelia Earhart.

Butler is a 1953 graduate of Bennington College, and went on to earn a master's degree in political science at Columbia University.

== Works ==
Butler spent ten years working on her biography of Amelia Earhart. She was partially inspired to work on the life of Earhart because her (Butler's) own mother had been a pilot and a member of the Ninety-Nines. She visited pertinent locations such as Trepassey and Harbour Grace, and did much of her research at the Schlesinger Library, which housed the papers of Amelia Earhart. The original title of the book was to be Amelia Earhart, An Extraordinary Woman, but Butler's husband put forward the idea of East to the Dawn. Butler explained the rationale behind the title in a 1997 Booknotes interview:

"...her major flights were from west to east, and she was on her solo flight across the Atlantic flying into the dawn. She was on her first flight, where she was just a passenger, from Newfoundland to Europe, flying into the dawn. And on her solo flight from Hawaii to California, she was flying into the dawn. And then, of course, on the last flight, where she was lost, she was lost flying into the dawn."

East to the Dawn was one of two books (along with The Sound of Wings by Mary S. Lovell) to be the basis for the 2009 film Amelia, directed by Mira Nair, and starring Hilary Swank as Amelia Earhart. Nair asked Butler to review the film's script for accuracy.

Title	Year	Publisher	ISBN	Subject matter	Comments
East to the Dawn: The Life of Amelia Earhart	1997	Da Capo Press	ISBN 9780201311440	Amelia Earhart	Booknotes interview with Butler on East to the Dawn, December 14, 1997, C-SPAN
My Dear Mr. Stalin: The Complete Correspondence of Franklin D. Roosevelt and Joseph V. Stalin	2006	Yale University Press	ISBN 9780300108545	Franklin D. Roosevelt, Joseph Stalin	Presentation by Butler on My Dear Mr. Stalin, December 7, 2005, C-SPAN
Roosevelt and Stalin: Portrait of a Partnership	2015	Knopf	ISBN 9780307594853	Franklin D. Roosevelt, Joseph Stalin	Presentation by Butler on Roosevelt and Stalin, April 2, 2015
