= List of Booknotes interviews first aired in 1992 =

Booknotes is an American television series on the C-SPAN network hosted by Brian Lamb, which originally aired from 1989 to 2004. The format of the show is a one-hour, one-on-one interview with a non-fiction author. The series was broadcast at 8 p.m. Eastern Time each Sunday night, and was the longest-running author interview program in U.S. broadcast history.

First broadcast (with link to transcript / video)	Author	Book	Subject matter
January 5, 1992	Charles Hamilton	Adam Clayton Powell, Jr.: The Political Biography of an American Dilemma	Adam Clayton Powell Jr.
January 12, 1992	August Heckscher	Woodrow Wilson: A Biography	Woodrow Wilson
January 26, 1992	Frederick Downs	No Longer Enemies, Not Yet Friends: An American Soldier Returns to Vietnam	The Vietnam War
February 2, 1992	Robert Cwiklik	House Rules: A Freshman Congressman's Initiation to the Backslapping, Backpedaling, and Backstabbing Ways of Washington	Peter Hoagland; The U.S. House of Representatives
February 9, 1992	Francis Fukuyama	The End of History and the Last Man	Liberal democracy; Sociocultural evolution
February 16, 1992	Al Gore	Earth in the Balance: Ecology and the Human Spirit	Ecology; Global Warming
February 23, 1992 and March 1, 1992	Richard Nixon	Seize the Moment: America's Challenge in a One-Superpower World	Foreign Policy of the United States
March 8, 1992	Robert Massie	Dreadnought: Britain, Germany, and the Coming of the Great War	HMS Dreadnought; Origins of World War I
March 22, 1992	Linda Chavez	Out of the Barrio: Toward a New Politics of Hispanic Assimilation	History of Hispanic and Latino Americans
March 29, 1992	Nan Robertson	The Girls in the Balcony: Women, Men, and the New York Times	The New York Times
April 12, 1992	Orlando Patterson	Freedom in the Making of Western Culture	Political freedom
April 19, 1992	Paul Hollander	Anti-Americanism: Critiques at Home and Abroad, 1965-1990	Anti-Americanism
April 26, 1992	Tinsley Yarbrough	John Marshall Harlan: Great Dissenter of the Warren Court	John Marshall Harlan II
May 3, 1992	Earl Black and Merle Black	The Vital South: How Presidents Are Elected	Southern strategy
May 5, 1992	Robert Remini	Henry Clay: Statesman for the Union	Henry Clay
May 10, 1992	David Moore	The Superpollsters: How They Measure and Manipulate Public Opinion in America	Category:Opinion polling in the United States
May 17, 1992	Robert Bartley	The Seven Fat Years and How to Do It Again	Category:1980s in economic history
May 31, 1992	Lester Thurow	Head to Head: The Coming Economic Battle Among Japan, Europe and America	Economy of Europe; Economy of Japan; Economy of the United States; Japan–United States relations
June 7, 1992	R. Emmett Tyrrell Jr.	The Conservative Crack-Up	Conservatism in the United States
June 14, 1992	William Lee Miller	The Business of May Next: James Madison and the Founding	James Madison
June 21, 1992	John Jackley	Hill Rat: Blowing the Lid Off Congress	The U.S. House of Representatives
June 28, 1992	David Savage	Turning Right: The Making of the Rehnquist Supreme Court	The Rehnquist Court; List of United States Supreme Court cases by the Rehnquist Court
July 5, 1992	William Rehnquist	Grand Inquests: The Historic Impeachments of Justice Samuel Chase and President Andrew Johnson	Federal impeachment in the United States; Samuel Chase; Impeachment of Andrew Johnson
July 12, 1992	Jeffrey Bell	Populism and Elitism: Politics in the Age of Equality	Populism and Elitism
July 19, 1992	David McCullough	Truman	Harry Truman
July 26, 1992	Richard Ben Cramer	What It Takes: The Way to the White House	1988 United States presidential election
August 2, 1992	Gilbert Fite	Richard B. Russell, Jr.: Senator from Georgia	Richard Russell Jr.
August 9, 1992	Robert Donovan and Ray Scherer	Unsilent Revolution: Television News and American Life	Television news in the United States
August 16, 1992	Martin Anderson	Impostors in the Temple	Higher education in the United States
August 23, 1992	Mickey Kaus	The End of Equality	Social equality
August 30, 1992	Neil Postman	Technopoly: The Surrender of Culture to Technology	Technology and society
September 6, 1992	Terry Eastland	Energy in the Executive: The Case for a Strong Presidency	President of the United States
September 13, 1992	James Billington	Russia Transformed: Breakthrough to Hope	Russia
September 20, 1992	Sen. Paul Simon	Advice and Consent: Clarence Thomas, Robert Bork and the Intriguing History of the Supreme Court's Nomination Battles	Clarence Thomas; Robert Bork
September 27, 1992	Walter Isaacson	Kissinger: A Biography	Henry Kissinger
October 18, 1992	George Will	Restoration: Congress, Term Limits and the Recovery of Deliberative Democracy	The U.S. Congress; Term limits in the United States
October 25, 1992	Susan Faludi	Backlash: The Undeclared War Against American Women	Feminism in the United States
November 8, 1992	Barbara Hinkley and Paul Brace	Follow the Leader: Opinion Polls and the Modern Presidents	Category:Opinion polling in the United States
November 15, 1992	Derrick Bell	Faces at the Bottom of the Well: The Permanence of Racism	Racism in the United States
November 22, 1992	Gen. Norman Schwarzkopf	It Doesn't Take a Hero	Memoir/Autobiography; United States Army; Gulf War
November 29, 1992	Charles Sykes	A Nation of Victims: The Decay of the American Character	Victim playing
December 6, 1992	Daniel Boorstin	The Creators	Cultural history; Creativity; History of the concept of creativity
December 13, 1992	Brian Kelly	Adventures in Porkland: How Washington Wastes Your Money and Why They Won't Stop	Pork barrel
December 20, 1992	Eric Alterman	Sound and Fury: The Washington Punditocracy and the Collapse of American Politics	Political journalism; Pundits
December 27, 1992	Michael Medved	Hollywood vs. America: Popular Culture and the War on Traditional Values	Cinema of the United States; Popular culture; Traditional values
