= Louise Barnett =

American author

Louise K. Barnett
- Occupations: Writer, journalist, historian, teacher
- Writing career
- Period: American Indian Wars, Vietnam War, American history
- Genres: historical, biography

Louise Barnett (1938-2021) was an author whose work included a biography of General Custer titled Touched by Fire: The Life, Death, and Afterlife of George Armstrong Custer (1996).

== Education and employment ==
Barnett had a Ph.D. in English and American literature from Bryn Mawr College (1972) taught as a Professor of American Studies at Rutgers University starting in 1976.

== Published works ==
External videos
- Booknotes interview with Barnett on Touched by Fire: The Life, Death, and Mythic Afterlife of George Armstrong Custer, October 13, 1996, C-SPAN

Barnett's best-known book, Touched by Fire: The Life, Death, and Mythic Afterlife of George Armstrong Custer (Henry Holt, 1996), won the 1996 John M. Carroll award of the Little Big Horn Associates for best book on Custer related studies. The New York Times Book Review commented "There is much unusual and useful information about life on the plains, Indian warfare, the danger and fear of captivity by Indians, and especially, the relationship between Custer and his wife."

The book led to a number of television appearances by Barnett on the topic, including an A&E network Custer biography and the C-SPAN show Booknotes. Touched by Fire was reissued in 2006 in softcover by the University of Nebraska Press. More recently, Barnett published Atrocity and American Military Justice in Southeast Asia (Routledge, UK, 2010) – a book which examines the prosecution of war crime trials in the Philippines and Vietnam.

== Bibliography ==
- The Ignoble Savage: American Literary Racism (Greenwood Press, 1976)
- New World Journeys: Italian Intellectuals and the Experience of America (Greenwood Press, 1978)
- Authority and Speech: Language, Society and Self in the American Novel (University of Georgia Press, 1993).
- Touched by Fire: The Life, Death, and Mythic Afterlife of George Armstrong Custer. Henry Holt. 1996. reprinted in 2006 ISBN 0803262663
- Ungentlemanly Acts: The Army's Notorious Incest Trial. New York: Hill & Wang Pub. 2000. ISBN 0809073986. OCLC 42061102.
- Jonathan Swift in the Company of Women (Oxford University Press, USA, 2006)
- Atrocity and American Military Justice in Southeast Asia. Routledge. 2010.
