= List of Booknotes interviews first aired in 1993 =

Booknotes is an American television series on the C-SPAN network hosted by Brian Lamb, which originally aired from 1989 to 2004. The format of the show is a one-hour, one-on-one interview with a non-fiction author. The series was broadcast at 8 p.m. Eastern Time each Sunday night, and was the longest-running author interview program in U.S. broadcast history.

First broadcast (with link to transcript / video)	Author	Book	Subject matter
January 3, 1993	Michael Davis and Hunter Clark	Thurgood Marshall: Warrior at the Bar, Rebel on the Bench	Thurgood Marshall
January 10, 1993	Jeffrey Birnbaum	The Lobbyists: How Influence Peddlers Get Their Way in Washington	Lobbying in the United States
January 17, 1993	P.F. Bentley	Clinton: Portrait of Victory	Bill Clinton presidential campaign, 1992
January 24, 1993	Robert Gilbert	The Mortal Presidency: Illness and Anguish in the White House	Calvin Coolidge; Franklin D. Roosevelt's paralytic illness; Health issues of Dwight D. Eisenhower; John F. Kennedy; Health of Ronald Reagan
January 31, 1993	Benjamin Stein	A License to Steal: The Untold Story of Michael Milken and the Conspiracy to Bilk the Nation	Michael Milken
February 7, 1993	Jack Nelson	Terror in the Night: The Klan's Campaign Against the Jews	The Ku Klux Klan
February 14, 1993	Nathan Miller	Theodore Roosevelt: A Life	Theodore Roosevelt
February 21, 1993	Richard Norton Smith	Patriarch: George Washington and the New American Nation	George Washington
February 28, 1993	Kay Mills	This Little Light of Mine: The Life of Fannie Lou Hamer	Fannie Lou Hamer
March 7, 1993	Alex Dragnich	Serbs and Croats: The Struggle in Yugoslavia	Serbs; Croats; Yugoslavia
March 14, 1993	Paul Kennedy	Preparing for the Twenty-First Century	21st century
March 21, 1993	Deborah Shapley	Promise and Power: The Life and Times of Robert McNamara	Robert McNamara
March 28, 1993	Michael Kelly	Martyrs' Day: Chronicle of a Small War	Gulf War; 20th century history of Iraq
April 4, 1993	Nadine Cohodas	Strom Thurmond and the Politics of Southern Change	Strom Thurmond
April 11, 1993	Blanche Wiesen Cook	Eleanor Roosevelt: Volume 1, 1884-1933	Eleanor Roosevelt
April 18, 1993	Douglas Brinkley	The Majic Bus: An American Odyssey	History of the United States
April 25, 1993	Lisa Belkin	First, Do No Harm: The Dramatic Story of Real Doctors and Patients Making Impossible Choices at a Big-City Hospital	Hermann Hospital; Medical ethics
May 2, 1993	Marshall DeBruhl	Sword of San Jacinto: A Life of Sam Houston	Sam Houston
May 9, 1993	Charles Adams	For Good and Evil: The Impact of Taxes on the Course of Civilization	Category:History of taxation
May 16, 1993	Anna Quindlen	Thinking Out Loud: On the Personal, the Political, the Public and the Private	Memoir/Autobiography; Journalism
May 23, 1993	George Ball	The Passionate Attachment: America's Involvement with Israel, 1947 to the Present	Israel–United States relations
May 30, 1993	Douglas Davis	The Five Myths of Television Power: Or, Why the Medium Is Not the Message	Television in the United States
June 6, 1993	J. Bowyer Bell	The Irish Troubles: A Generation of Violence 1967-1992	The Troubles
June 13, 1993	David Brock	The Real Anita Hill	Anita Hill
June 20, 1993	Howard Kurtz	Media Circus: The Trouble with America's Newspapers	Newspapers in the United States
June 27, 1993	George Shultz	Turmoil and Triumph: My Years as Secretary of State	Memoir/Autobiography; Presidency of Ronald Reagan; United States Secretary of State
July 4, 1993	Joel Krieger	The Oxford Companion to Politics of the World	International relations
July 11, 1993	David Halberstam	The Fifties	United States in the 1950s
July 18, 1993	Molly Moore	A Woman at War: Storming Kuwait with the U.S. Marines	Memoir/Autobiography; United States Marine Corps; Gulf War; War journalism
July 25, 1993	David Remnick	Lenin's Tomb: The Last Days of the Soviet Empire	Dissolution of the Soviet Union
August 1, 1993	Alexander Brook and Warren H. Phillips	The Hard Way: The Odyssey of a Weekly Newspaper Editor	Newspapers; Kennebunk, Maine
August 8, 1993	Tom Rosenstiel	Strange Bedfellows: How Television and the Presidential Candidates Changed American Politics, 1992	1992 United States presidential election; ABC News
August 15, 1993	Lewis Lapham	The Wish for Kings: Democracy at Bay	Federal government of the United States
August 22, 1993	Harold Holzer	The Lincoln-Douglas Debates	The Lincoln-Douglas debates
August 29, 1993	Peter Macdonald	Giap: The Victor in Vietnam	General Võ Nguyên Giáp
September 5, 1993	Joseph Ellis	Passionate Sage: The Character and Legacy of John Adams	John Adams
September 12, 1993	Ronald Kessler	The FBI: Inside the World's Most Powerful Law Enforcement Agency	The Federal Bureau of Investigation
September 19, 1993	Madeline Cartwright	For the Children: Lessons from a Visionary Principal—How We Can Save Our Public School	School District of Philadelphia; Public education in the United States
September 26, 1993	Malcolm Browne	Muddy Boots and Red Socks	Memoir/Autobiography; War journalism; Vietnam War
October 3, 1993	Peter Skerry	Mexican-Americans: The Ambivalent Minority	Mexican Americans
October 10, 1993	Alan Brinkley	The Unfinished Nation: A Concise History of the American People	The History of the United States
October 17, 1993	Christopher Hitchens	For the Sake of Argument	Christopher Hitchens's political views
October 24, 1993	William F. Buckley Jr.	Happy Days Were Here Again: Reflections of a Libertarian Journalist	Memoir/Autobiography; The National Review; Firing Line
October 31, 1993	Andrew Nagorski	The Birth of Freedom: Shaping Lives and Societies in the New Eastern Europe	Eastern Europe
November 7, 1993	Charles Mee	Playing God: Seven Fateful Moments When Great Men Met to Change the World	Pope Leo I and Attila the Hun; Henry VIII of England and Francis I of France; Hernán Cortés and Moctezuma II; Congress of Vienna; Paris Peace Conference, 1919; Yalta Conference; G7
November 14, 1993	Herbert Block	Herblock: A Cartoonist's Life	Memoir/Autobiography; Editorial cartoons
November 28, 1993	Betty Friedan	The Fountain of Age	Ageing
December 5, 1993	Margaret Thatcher	The Downing Street Years	Memoir/Autobiography; Premiership of Margaret Thatcher
December 12, 1993	Richard Reeves	President Kennedy: Profile of Power	John F. Kennedy
December 19, 1993	John Podhoretz	Hell of a Ride: Backstage at the White House Follies 1989-1993	Memoir/Autobiography; Presidency of George H. W. Bush
December 26, 1993	Willard Sterne Randall	Thomas Jefferson: A Life	Thomas Jefferson
