= List of Booknotes interviews first aired in 1999 =

Booknotes is an American television series on the C-SPAN network hosted by Brian Lamb, which originally aired from 1989 to 2004. The format of the show is a one-hour, one-on-one interview with a non-fiction author. The series was broadcast at 8 p.m. Eastern Time each Sunday night, and was the longest-running author interview program in U.S. broadcast history.

First broadcast (with link to transcript / video)	Author	Book	Subject matter
January 3, 1999	P.J. O'Rourke	Eat the Rich	Capitalism; Economy of Russia; Economy of Sweden; Economy of Tanzania; Economy of Hong Kong
January 10, 1999	John Morris	Get the Picture: A Personal History of Photojournalism	Memoir/Autobiography; Photojournalism
January 17, 1999	Dava Sobel	Longitude: The True Story of a Lone Genius Who Solved the Greatest Scientific Problem of His Time	History of longitude; John Harrison; Longitude prize
January 24, 1999	Michael Ignatieff	Isaiah Berlin: A Life	Isaiah Berlin
January 31, 1999	Peter Kann and Frances FitzGerald	Reporting Vietnam	The Vietnam War
February 7, 1999	Harold Evans	The American Century	American Century
February 14, 1999	Virginia Postrel	The Future and Its Enemies	Social change
February 21, 1999	Annette Gordon-Reed	Thomas Jefferson and Sally Hemings: An American Controversy	Thomas Jefferson; Sally Hemings
February 28, 1999	Robert Famighetti	The World Almanac and Book of Facts 1999	Reference work
March 7, 1999	Tom Brokaw	The Greatest Generation	Military history of the United States during World War II; United States home front during World War II; Great Depression in the United States
March 14, 1999	Allen Weinstein	The Haunted Wood: Soviet Espionage in America The Stalin Era	History of Soviet and Russian espionage in the United States
March 21, 1999	Richard Shenkman	Presidential Ambition: How the Presidents Gained Power, Kept Power, and Got Things Done	President of the United States
March 28, 1999	Norman Podhoretz	Ex-Friends: Falling Out with Allen Ginsberg, Lionel and Diana Trilling, Lillian Hellman, Hannah Arendt, and Norman Mailer	Memoir/Autobiography; Neo-Conservatives; Allen Ginsberg; Lionel and Diana Trilling; Lillian Hellman; Hannah Arendt; Norman Mailer
April 4, 1999	Booknotes 10th Anniversary	N/A	Excerpts from and interviews about the first ten years of Booknotes
April 11, 1999	Amity Shlaes	The Greedy Hand: How Taxes Drive Americans Crazy and What to Do About It	Taxation in the United States
April 18, 1999	Max Frankel	The Times of My Life and My Life with the Times	Memoir/Autobiography; The New York Times
April 25, 1999	Randall Kenan	Walking on Water: Black American Lives at the Turn of the Twentieth Century	African Americans
May 2, 1999	Mary Soames	Winston and Clementine: The Personal Letters of the Churchills	Winston Churchill; Clementine Churchill
May 9, 1999	Betty Boyd Caroli	The Roosevelt Women	Roosevelt family; Eleanor Roosevelt; Edith Roosevelt; Alice Roosevelt Longworth; Corinne Roosevelt Robinson; Corinne Alsop Cole; Sara Delano Roosevelt; Martha Bulloch Roosevelt; Anna Roosevelt Cowles
May 16, 1999	T.R. Reid	Confucius Lives Next Door: What Living in the East Teaches Us About Living in the West	Culture of Japan
May 23, 1999	Jean Strouse	Morgan: American Financier	J.P. Morgan
May 30, 1999	Bill Gertz	Betrayal: How the Clinton Administration Undermined American Security	Foreign policy of the Bill Clinton administration
June 6, 1999	Roger Mudd	Great Minds of History	Historiography of the United States; Gordon Wood; James McPherson; Richard White; David McCullough; Stephen Ambrose
June 13, 1999	Joseph Stevens	1863: Rebirth of a Nation	1863 in the United States
June 20, 1999	David Kennedy	Freedom From Fear: The American People in Depression and War	History of the United States (1918–1945); Timeline of United States history (1930–1949)
June 27, 1999	Jon Margolis	The Last Innocent Year: America in 1964	1964 in the United States
July 4, 1999	Floyd Flake	The Way of the Bootstrapper: Nine Action Steps For Achieving Your Dreams	Motivation
July 11, 1999	Michael Korda	Another Life: A Memoir of Other People	Memoir/Autobiography; Simon & Schuster
July 18, 1999	Michael Cottman	The Wreck of the Henrietta Marie: An African-American's Spiritual Journey to Uncover a Sunken Slave Ship's Past	Henrietta Marie
July 25, 1999	Dan Rather	Deadlines & Datelines: Essays at the Turn of the Century	Memoir/Autobiography; Journalism; CBS News
August 1, 1999	Richard Gephardt	An Even Better Place: America in the 21st Century	Memoir/Autobiography; Economic issues in the United States
August 8, 1999	H.W. Crocker	Robert E. Lee on Leadership	Robert E. Lee; Leadership
August 15, 1999	Elizabeth Norman	We Band of Angels: The Untold Story of American Nurses Trapped on Bataan by the Japanese	Angels of Bataan
August 22, 1999	David Atkinson	Leaving the Bench: Supreme Court Justices at the End	Supreme Court of the United States
August 29, 1999	Mark Pendergrast	Uncommon Grounds: The History of Coffee and How It Transformed Our World	Coffee
September 5, 1999	Leslie Chang	Beyond the Narrow Gate: The Journey of Four Chinese Women From the Middle Kingdom to Middle America	Memoir/Autobiography; Taipei First Girls' High School; Chinese Americans
September 12, 1999	Jay Parini	Robert Frost: A Life	Robert Frost
September 19, 1999	Richard Cohen	Rostenkowski: The Pursuit of Power and the End of the Old Politics	Dan Rostenkowski
September 26, 1999	Linda McMurry	To Keep the Waters Troubled: The Life of Ida B. Wells	Ida B. Wells
October 3, 1999	James Glassman	Dow 36,000: The New Strategy for Profiting from the Coming Rise in the Stock Market	Dow Jones Industrial Average; Economic growth
October 10, 1999	Stuart Rochester	Honor Bound: American Prisoners of War in Southeast Asia, 1961–1973	American POWs in the Vietnam War
October 17, 1999	Witold Rybczynski	A Clearing in the Distance: Frederick Law Olmsted and America in the 19th Century	Frederick Law Olmsted
October 24, 1999	Michael Kammen	American Culture, American Tastes: Social Change and the 20th Century	Popular culture
October 31, 1999	Patrick Tyler	Great Wall: Six Presidents and China, An Investigative History	Sino-American relations
November 7, 1999	Eugene Robinson	Coal to Cream: A Black Man's Journey Beyond Color to an Affirmation of Race	Memoir/Autobiography; Race in the United States; Race and ethnicity in Brazil
November 14, 1999	Fred Maroon	The Nixon Years, 1969–1974: White House to Watergate	Richard Nixon
November 21, 1999	Alfred Young	The Shoemaker and the Tea Party: Memory and the American Revolution	George Robert Twelves Hewes; The Boston Tea Party
November 28, 1999	Winston Churchill	The Great Republic: A History of America	The United States of America; History of the United States
December 5, 1999	Edmund Morris	Dutch: A Memoir of Ronald Reagan	Ronald Reagan
December 12, 1999	Michael Patrick MacDonald	All Souls: A Family Story from Southie	Boston
December 19, 1999	Robert Conquest	Reflections on a Ravaged Century	Nazism; History of communism
December 26, 1999	Tom Wheeler	Leadership Lessons from the Civil War	The American Civil War; Leadership
