= List of Booknotes interviews first aired in 1998 =

Booknotes is an American television series on the C-SPAN network hosted by Brian Lamb, which originally aired from 1989 to 2004. The format of the show is a one-hour, one-on-one interview with a non-fiction author. The series was broadcast at 8 p.m. Eastern Time each Sunday night, and was the longest-running author interview program in U.S. broadcast history.

First broadcast (with link to transcript / video)	Author	Book	Subject matter
January 4, 1998	Paul Nagel	John Quincy Adams: A Public Life, A Private Life	John Quincy Adams
January 11, 1998	Iris Chang	The Rape of Nanking: The Forgotten Holocaust of World War II	The Nanking Massacre
January 18, 1998	Allan Metcalf and David Barnhart	America In So Many Words	American English
January 25, 1998	Daniel Pipes	Conspiracy: How the Paranoid Style Flourishes and Where It Comes From	Conspiracy theories
February 1, 1998	Roger Simon	Showtime: The American Political Circus and the Race for the White House	United States presidential primary
February 8, 1998	Carol Reardon	Pickett's Charge in History & Memory	George Pickett; Pickett's Charge
February 15, 1998	Joseph Hernon	Profiles in Character: Hubris and Heroism in the U.S. Senate, 1789-1990	The United States Senate
February 22, 1998	William Gildea	Where the Game Matters Most	Hoosier Hysteria
March 1, 1998	John Lukacs	The Hitler of History	Adolf Hitler
March 8, 1998	John Marszalek	The Petticoat Affair: Manners, Mutiny and Sex in Andrew Jackson's White House	The Petticoat affair
March 15, 1998	Randall Robinson	Defending the Spirit: A Black Life in America	Memoir/Autobiography; TransAfrica
March 22, 1998	Ernest Lefever	The Irony of Virtue: Ethics and American Power	Ethics
March 29, 1998	Douglas L. Wilson	Honor's Voice: The Transformation of Abraham Lincoln	Abraham Lincoln
April 5, 1998	Paul Johnson	A History of the American People	History of the United States
April 12, 1998	Taylor Branch	Pillar of Fire: America in the King Years 1963-65	Martin Luther King Jr.
April 19, 1998	John S.D. Eisenhower	Agent of Destiny: The Life and Times of General Winfield Scott	Winfield Scott
April 26, 1998	Molly Ivins	You Got to Dance with Them What Brung You: Politics in the Clinton Years	Politics of the United States; Politics of Texas; Presidency of Bill Clinton
May 3, 1998	David Aikman	Great Souls: Six Who Changed the Century	Mother Teresa; Nelson Mandela; Billy Graham; Aleksandr Solzhenitsyn; Pope John II; Elie Wiesel
May 10, 1998	Arthur Schlesinger Jr.	The Disuniting of America: Reflections on a Multicultural Society	Multiculturalism
May 17, 1998	Patrick Buchanan	The Great Betrayal: How American Sovereignty and Social Justice are Being Sacrificed to the Gods of the Global Economy	Globalism
May 24, 1998	Jill Ker Conway	When Memory Speaks: Reflections on Autobiography	Memoirs and Autobiographies
May 31, 1998	Max Boot	Out of Order: Arrogance, Corruption, and Incompetence on the Bench	Corruption in local government; Law of the United States
June 7, 1998	Linda Simon	Genuine Reality: A Life of William James	William James
June 14, 1998	Edward Lazarus	Closed Chambers: The First Eyewitness Account of the Epic Struggles Inside the Supreme Court	The Supreme Court of the United States
June 21, 1998	Ron Chernow	Titan: The Life of John D. Rockefeller, Sr.	John D. Rockefeller
June 28, 1998	Edward Larson	Summer for the Gods: The Scopes Trial and America's Continuing Debate over Science and Religion	The Scopes Trial; Relationship between religion and science
July 5, 1998	Andrew Carroll	Letters of a Nation: A Collection of Extraordinary American Letters	Letters
July 12, 1998	John Lewis	Walking With the Wind: A Memoir of the Movement	Memoir/Autobiography; Civil Rights Movement
July 19, 1998	Ben H. Procter	William Randolph Hearst: The Early Years, 1863-1910	William Randolph Hearst
July 26, 1998	Richard Holbrooke	To End a War	Bosnian War; Dayton Agreement
August 2, 1998	F. Carolyn Graglia	Domestic Tranquility: A Brief Against Feminism	Feminism; Antifeminism
August 9, 1998	Roy Reed	Faubus: The Life and Times of An American Prodigal	Orval Faubus
August 16, 1998	Patricia O'Toole	Money and Morals in America	Philanthropy in the United States
August 23, 1998	Barbara Crossette	The Great Hill Stations of Asia	Hill stations
August 30, 1998	Robert Sobel	Coolidge: An America Enigma	Calvin Coolidge
September 6, 1998	Linda Davis	Badge of Courage: The Life of Stephen Crane	Stephen Crane
September 13, 1998	Arnold Rogow	A Fatal Friendship: Alexander Hamilton and Aaron Burr	Alexander Hamilton; Aaron Burr; Burr–Hamilton duel
September 20, 1998	Larry Tye	The Father of Spin: Edward L. Bernays and the Birth of Public Relations	Edward Bernays; Public relations
September 27, 1998	Balint Vazsonyi	America’s 30 Years War: Who Is Winning?	Economic history of the United States; Socialism
October 4, 1998	George Bush and Brent Scowcroft	A World Transformed	United States foreign policy; History of the United States National Security Council 1989–1993; Cold War (1985–1991)
October 11, 1998	Juan Williams	Thurgood Marshall: American Revolutionary	Thurgood Marshall
October 18, 1998	Christopher Dickey	Summer of Deliverance: A Memoir of Father and Son	Memoir/Autobiography; James Dickey; The novel Deliverance; The film Deliverance
October 25, 1998	Dorothy Herrmann	Helen Keller: A Life	Helen Keller
November 1, 1998	Charles Lewis	The Buying of the Congress: How Special Interests Have Stolen Your Right to Life, Liberty, and the Pursuit of Happiness	Lobbying in the United States
November 8, 1998	Simon Winchester	The Professor and the Madman: A Tale of Murder, Insanity, and the Making of the Oxford English Dictionary	The Oxford English Dictionary; William Chester Minor; James Murray
November 15, 1998	Eric Foner	The Story of American Freedom	Civil liberties in the United States; Political freedom
November 22, 1998	Philip Gourevitch	We Wish to Inform You That Tomorrow We Will Be Killed With Our Families: Stories From Rwanda	Rwandan genocide
November 29, 1998	Melissa Müller	Anne Frank: The Biography	Anne Frank
December 6, 1998	Shelby Steele	A Dream Deferred: The Second Betrayal of Black Freedom in America	Affirmative action; Reverse discrimination
December 13, 1998	William Greider	Fortress America: The American Military and the Consequences of Peace	Military budget of the United States
December 20, 1998	A. Scott Berg	Lindbergh	Charles Lindbergh
December 27, 1998	Peter Jennings	The Century	American Century
