= List of Booknotes interviews first aired in 1995 =

Booknotes is an American television series on the C-SPAN network hosted by Brian Lamb, which originally aired from 1989 to 2004. The format of the show is a one-hour, one-on-one interview with a non-fiction author. The series was broadcast at 8 p.m. Eastern Time each Sunday night, and was the longest-running author interview program in U.S. broadcast history.

| First broadcast (with link to transcript / video) | Author | Book | Subject matter |
|---|---|---|---|
| January 1, 1995 | Doris Kearns Goodwin | No Ordinary Time: Franklin and Eleanor Roosevelt -- The Home Front in World War II | Franklin D. Roosevelt; Eleanor Roosevelt; United States home front during World War II |
| January 8, 1995 | Robert Wright | The Moral Animal: Why We Are the Way We Are -- The New Science of Evolutionary Psychology | Evolutionary Psychology |
| January 15, 1995 | Anthony Cave Brown | Treason in the Blood: H. St. John Philby, Kim Philby, and the Spy Case of the Century | St. John Philby; Kim Philby; The Cambridge Five |
| January 22, 1995 | Marvin Olasky | The Tragedy of American Compassion | Criticism of The war on poverty |
| January 29, 1995 | Steven Waldman | The Bill: How the Adventures of Clinton's National Service Bill Reveal What Is Corrupt, Comic, Cynical, and Noble about Washington | Corporation for National and Community Service |
| February 5, 1995 | M. Stanton Evans | The Theme is Freedom: Religion, Politics, and the American Tradition | Political freedom; Economic freedom |
| February 12, 1995 | Philip Howard | The Death of Common Sense: How Law is Suffocating America | Individual and group rights |
| February 19, 1995 | Jimmy Carter | Always a Reckoning and Other Poems | Poetry |
| February 26, 1995 | Alan Ryan | Introduction to Alexis de Tocqueville's Democracy in America | Alexis de Tocqueville; Democracy in America |
| March 5, 1995 | Lynn Sherr | Failure Is Impossible: Susan B. Anthony in Her Own Words | Susan B. Anthony |
| March 12, 1995 | Donald Kagan | On the Origins of War | War |
| March 19, 1995 | Neil Baldwin | Edison: Inventing the Century | Thomas Edison |
| March 26, 1995 | James Loewen | Lies My Teacher Told Me: Everything Your American History Textbook Got Wrong | Textbooks; Eurocentrism |
| April 2, 1995 | Gertrude Himmelfarb | The De-Moralization of Society: From Victorian Virtues to Modern Values | Victorian morality |
| April 9, 1995 | Stanley Greenberg | Middle Class Dreams: The Politics and Power of the New American Majority | American middle class |
| April 16, 1995 | Alvin Toffler and Heidi Toffler | Creating a New Civilization: The Politics of the Third Wave | The Third Wave (Toffler book); Post-industrial society |
| April 23, 1995 (Pt. 1 and Pt. 2) | Robert McNamara | In Retrospect: The Tragedy and Lessons of Vietnam | The Vietnam War |
| April 30, 1995 | Michael Klare | Rogue States and Nuclear Outlaws: America's Search for a New Foreign Policy | Foreign Policy of the United States |
| May 7, 1995 | David Maraniss | First in His Class: A Biography of Bill Clinton | Bill Clinton |
| May 14, 1995 | Tim Penny and Major Garrett | Common Cents | Politics of the United States; Federal government of the United States |
| May 21, 1995 | Linn Washington | Black Judges on Justice | Category:African-American judges; Robert N. C. Nix, Jr. |
| May 28, 1995 | John Niven | Salmon P. Chase: A Biography | Salmon P. Chase |
| June 4, 1995 | Hanan Ashrawi | This Side of Peace | Memoir/Autobiography; Peace process in the Israeli–Palestinian conflict |
| June 11, 1995 | Peter Brimelow | Alien Nation: Common Sense About America's Immigration Disaster | Immigration to the United States |
| June 18, 1995 | Yuri Shvets | Washington Station: My Life as a KGB Spy in America | The KGB; History of Soviet and Russian espionage in the United States |
| June 25, 1995 | Norman Mailer | Oswald's Tale: An American Mystery | Lee Harvey Oswald |
| July 2, 1995 | Ari Hoogenboom | Rutherford B. Hayes: Warrior & President | Rutherford B. Hayes |
| July 9, 1995 | DeWayne Wickham | Woodholme: A Black Man's Story of Growing Up Alone | Memoir/Autobiography; African Americans |
| July 16, 1995 | Armstrong Williams | Beyond Blame: How We Can Succeed by Breaking the Dependency Barrier | Blame; Affirmative action in the United States |
| July 23, 1995 | Newt Gingrich | To Renew America | United States history; Conservatism in the United States |
| July 30, 1995 | John Hockenberry | Moving Violations: A Memoir—War Zones, Wheelchairs, and Declarations of Independence | Memoir/Autobiography; Journalism; Physical disability |
| August 6, 1995 | Marc Fisher | After the Wall: Germany, The Germans, and the Burdens of History | Germany; The Berlin Wall |
| August 13, 1995 | Robert D. Richardson, Jr. | Emerson: The Mind on Fire | Ralph Waldo Emerson |
| August 20, 1995 | Cartha "Deke" DeLoach | Hoover's FBI: The Inside Story by Hoover's Trusted Lieutenant | J. Edgar Hoover; The Federal Bureau of Investigation |
| August 27, 1995 | Robert Timberg | The Nightingale's Song | John McCain; Bud McFarlane; Oliver North; John Poindexter; Jim Webb; The U.S. Naval Academy; The Vietnam War; The Iran-Contra Affair |
| September 3, 1995 | Robert Leckie | Okinawa: The Last Battle of World War II | The Battle of Okinawa |
| September 10, 1995 | Emory Thomas | Robert E. Lee: A Biography | Robert E. Lee |
| September 17, 1995 | Elsa Walsh | Divided Lives: The Public and Private Struggles of Three Accomplished Women | Meredith Vieira; Rachael Worby; Alison Estabrook |
| September 24, 1995 | Irving Kristol | Neoconservatism: The Autobiography of an Idea | Neoconservatism |
| October 1, 1995 | Andrew Sullivan | Virtually Normal: An Argument About Homosexuality | Homosexuality |
| October 8, 1995 | Susan Eisenhower | Breaking Free: A Memoir of Love | Memoir/Autobiography; Roald Sagdeev |
| October 15, 1995 | Nicholas Basbanes | A Gentle Madness: Bibliophiles, Bibliomanes, and the Eternal Passion for Books | Bibliomania; Bibliophilia |
| October 22, 1995 | David Fromkin | In The Time of Americans: The Generation that Changed America's Role in the World | History of U.S. foreign policy; Franklin D. Roosevelt; Harry Truman; Dwight D. Eisenhower; George Marshall; Douglas MacArthur |
| October 29, 1995 | Ben Bradlee | A Good Life: Newspapering and Other Adventures | The Washington Post |
| November 5, 1995 | Marlin Fitzwater | Call the Briefing! Bush and Reagan, Sam and Helen: A Decade with Presidents and the Press | Memoir/Autobiography; White House Press Secretary; Presidency of Ronald Reagan; Category:Presidency of George H. W. Bush |
| November 12, 1995 | Pierre Salinger | P.S., A Memoir | Memoir/Autobiography; White House Press Secretary; Kennedy Administration |
| November 19, 1995 | bell hooks | Killing Rage: Ending Racism | Racism in the United States |
| November 26, 1995 | Sanford Ungar | Fresh Blood: The New American Immigrants | Immigration to the United States |
| December 3, 1995 | James Baker | The Politics of Diplomacy: Revolution, War and Peace, 1989-1992 | Memoir/Autobiography; United States Secretary of State; George H. W. Bush |
| December 10, 1995 | David Brinkley | A Memoir | Memoir/Autobiography; Journalism |
| December 17, 1995 | Evan Thomas | The Very Best Men: Four Who Dared—The Early Years of the CIA | The Central Intelligence Agency |
| December 24, 1995 | David Herbert Donald | Lincoln | Abraham Lincoln |
| December 31, 1995 | Charles Kuralt | Charles Kuralt's America | The United States of America; CBS News Sunday Morning |
