= Niccolo's Smile =

Niccolo's Smile: A Biography of Machiavelli is a translation of Machiavelli's diaries and memoirs by Maurizio Viroli, a scholar from the University of Bologna, Italy, and Princeton University.

Published in 1998 using Machiavelli's original source materials, the author recreates his biography.

"Machiavellian" is a pejorative term suggesting serpentine scheming and use of immoral, ruthless means to achieve desired ends. Those ends usually include the maintenance of power at all costs. Some scholars assert that Machiavelli endorses these methods in his works on political philosophy. He lived in interesting but chaotic and often violent times. Viroli states that Machiavelli's longing for a powerful ruler was not merely based on a cynical wish to see power exercised; rather, he posits that Machiavelli hoped for a strong and, if necessary, devious ruler who could rule effectively but also wisely and justly. In his personal life, he is revealed here as a caring, sensitive man who, contrary to expectations, was frequently ruled by his heart rather than his head.

Describing "Machiavelli's Dream", the author recounts a legend in which on his death bed, the great philosopher gathered his friends and told of a dream. In the dream, a band of ragged, poorly dressed and miserable men were the self-described "saintly and blessed; we are on our way to Heaven". He then saw a crowd of solemnly attired, noble men of grave appearance. He recognized among them Plato, Plutarch, and Tacitus. They told him "We are the damned of Hell". Machiavelli tells his friends he would be far happier in Hell where he could discuss politics with the great men of the ancient world, whereas in Heaven he would languish in boredom among the saintly and blessed.
