= Bill Thomas (American writer, born 1943) =

American author and journalist

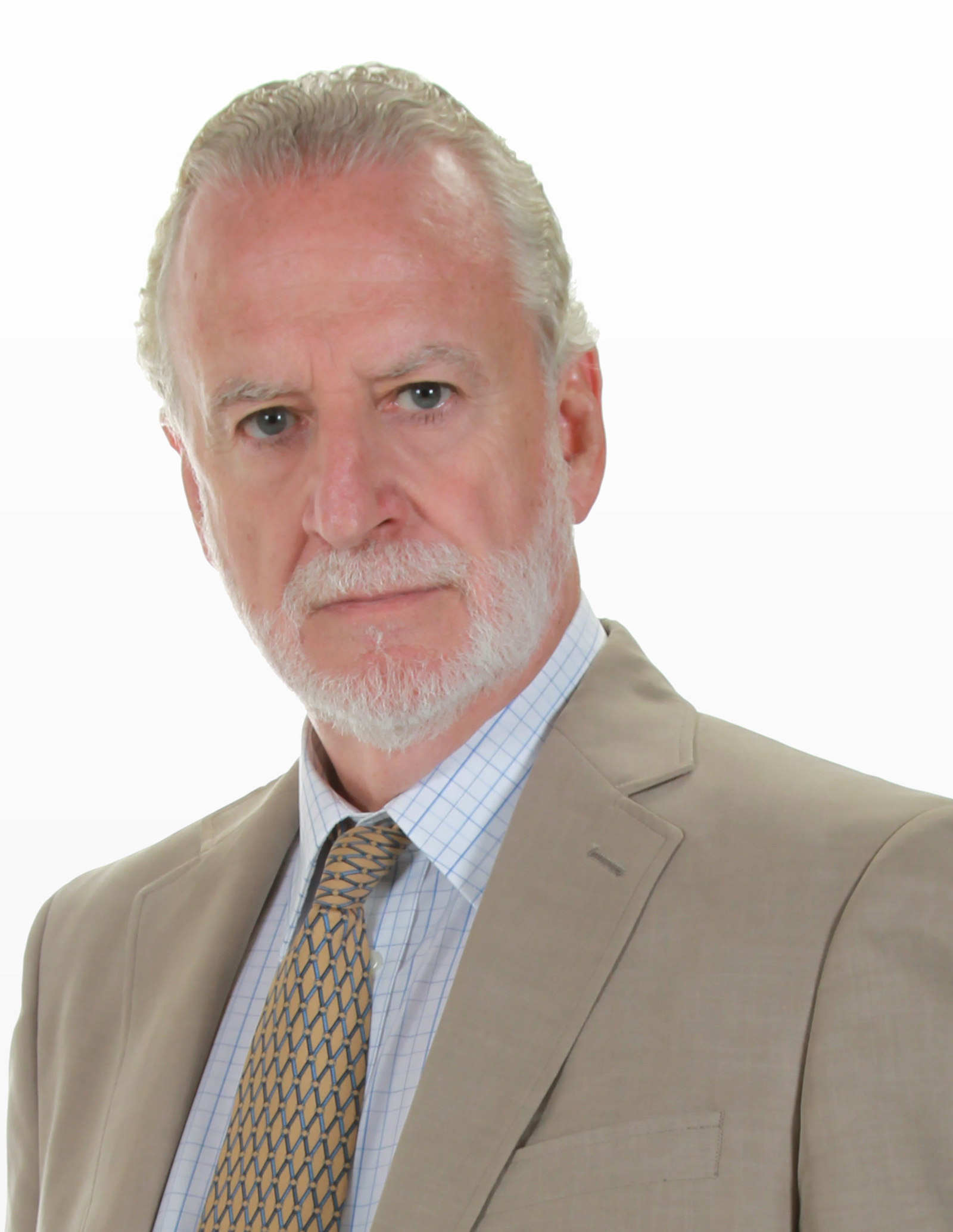
- Born: June 1, 1943; Chicago, Illinois
- Occupations: Author, Journalist
- Known for: Writing

Bill Thomas (born June 1, 1943) is an American author and journalist. He has written books on the legal profession, capitalism in Russia and the corrupting influence of money on Capitol Hill. In 2010, Thomas unsuccessfully ran for Maryland's 8th congressional district seat in the U.S. House of Representatives as a Republican.

== Work ==
Thomas' books reflect his career-long interest in politics and economics. His work examines how misplaced trust in alleged 'experts' can have calamitous as well as amusing consequences. The New York Times Book Review called his first book Lawyers and Thieves, coauthored by Roy Grutman, a “wry, witty, eloquent” look at the practice of law. The Wall Street Journal called it an “entertaining expose” of the legal profession, from the seamy world of New York personal-injury lawyers to the highest court in the land. Los Angeles Times said Lawyers and Thieves, “has the quality of hard-boiled mystery fiction, tough, knowing and full of dirty little secrets.”

Red Tape: Adventure Capitalism in the New Russia (Dutton) details how business is done in Russia. Thomas and co-author Charles Sutherland drew on more than 25 extended trips to Russia and the former Soviet Republics in researching this book. Kirkus Reviews say that Thomas and Sutherland have written “a breezy, street-wise guide…that does for the New Russia what P.J. O’Rourke’s Parliament of Whores did for the U.S. government.”

Thomas launched and wrote “Heard of the Hill,” Roll Call newspaper's widely read political-insider column. Based on years of experience in writing about Congress, his book, Club Fed: Power, Money, Sex and Violence on Capitol Hill, (Scribner's) was praised by The Washington Post as “timely…entertaining…required reading.” The American Lawyer called it “a sprawling and ribald collection of salacious scandals.”

== Running for Congress ==
Thomas ran in the Republican primary for the U.S. House of Representatives in Maryland's 8th congressional district in 2010. The district was rated "Safe Democratic" by CQ Politics. Thomas had 3 opponents in the primary: Michael Lee Philips, Bruce Stern, and Christine Thron. Thomas finished 4th in a field of 4 with 15% of the vote; Michael Lee Phillips with 32% of the vote finished first in the primary. The election itself was won by incumbent Chris Van Hollen, Democrat.

== Books ==
External videos
- Booknotes interview with Thomas on Club Fed November 6, 1994, C-SPAN

- Lawyers and Thieves (with Roy Grutman), Simon & Schuster (June 1990), hardcover, 352 pages ISBN 0671669605 ISBN 978-0671669607
- Red Tape: Adventure Capitalism in the New Russia (with Charles Sutherland), Dutton (October 1, 1992), hardcover, 288 pages, ISBN 0525935029 ISBN 978-0525935025;
- Club Fed: Power, Money Sex and Violence on Capitol Hill, Scribner's (October 17, 1994), hardcover: 320 pages, ISBN 0684196352 ISBN 978-0684196350
- Capital Confidential: One Hundred Years of Sex, Scandal, and Secrets in Washington, D.C., Pocket Books, (April 1996), paperback: 154 pages, ISBN 0671553100 ISBN 978-0671553104
