= Phyllis Lee Levin =

American fashion journalist (1921–2025)

Phyllis Lee Levin (March 11, 1921 – November 27, 2025) was an American fashion reporter and author. She graduated from Mount Holyoke College in 1941. Her work at the New York Times influenced Betty Friedan's book The Feminine Mystique.

== Books ==
- The Wheels of Fashion (1965)
- Great Historic Houses of America (1970)
- Abigail Adams (1987)
- Edith and Woodrow (2001)
- The Remarkable Education of John Quincy Adams (2015)
- John Quincy Adams and the Blessing of Liberty (2023)
