= Johanna Neuman =

American journalist and historian

Johanna Neuman is an American journalist and historian.

== Life ==
She worked for USA Today and the Los Angeles Times. She was a Nieman Fellow. She graduated from American University. She was scholar in residence at American University.

== Works ==
External videos
- Booknotes interview with Neuman on Lights, Camera, War, March 10, 1996, C-SPAN
- Presentation by Neuman on Lights, Camera, War, April 2, 1996, C-SPAN
- Interview with Neuman on Gilded Suffragists, January 7, 2017, C-SPAN
- Presentation by Neuman on Gilded Suffragists, October 7, 2017, C-SPAN

- Lights, camera, war : is media technology driving international politics? New York : St. Martin's Press, 1996. ISBN 9780312140045
- Gilded suffragists : the New York socialites who fought for women's right to vote, New York Washington Mews Books, 2019. ISBN 9781479806621
- And yet they persisted : how American women won the right to vote, Hoboken, NJ : Wiley Blackwell, 2020. ISBN 9781119530831
