= Edith and Woodrow =

2001 book by Phyllis Lee Levin

Edith and Woodrow: The Wilson White House is a 2001 book by Phyllis Lee Levin, published by Scribner.

It documents Edith Bolling Wilson's de facto rule during the portion of the Presidency of Woodrow Wilson after the man suffered a stroke in 1919. She did this by blockading the media from covering the effects of the stroke, so the public did not know that Wilson had been incapacitated. The state of affairs lasted for the rest of Wilson's presidency. Edith made political decisions and then falsely stated that they originated from Woodrow Wilson.

Edwin M. Yoder Jr. of Washington and Lee University wrote that the author's reception of Edith was "severe"; the author argued that Ellen Axson Wilson would not have made the same choices.

== Background ==
The author previously worked as a journalist for The New York Times.

The research material included medical documents that previously were not accessible; such as documents written by Woodrow Wilson's doctor, Cary T. Grayson. The sons of Grayson made them public. Publishers Weekly stated that the Grayson documents were "Most important" of the sourcing.

The sourcing documents stated that Woodrow Wilson would be unable to fulfill his duties, and Grayson's notes stated that significantly improving the medical condition was not possible.

== Contents ==
The book has around 300 pages of background material, then, for the remainder, covers the main subject.

== Reception ==
According to Yoder, the work is "sophisticated", and "informed" on information on American politics and the United States constitution. Yoder criticized how the book gave, in his view, too much space to the background information.

Kirkus Reviews stated that the book would likely "excite discussion" in post-secondary educational environments.

Publishers Weekly gave the work a starred review.
