= History of the United States (1980–1991) =

The United States of America — Reagan era
- 1980–1991
History of the United States (1964–1980)	History of the United States (1991–2016)
- President Ronald Reagan and Mikhail Gorbachev Shake Hands at The Moscow Summit Signing Ceremony for The Ratification of Intermediate Range Nuclear Forces Inf Treaty
- Location: United States
- Including: Late Cold War; Third Industrial Revolution; War on drugs
- Presidents: Jimmy Carter; Ronald Reagan; George H. W. Bush
- Key events: Iran hostage crisis; 1980 eruption of Mount St. Helens; Early 1980s recession; Reaganomics; Iran–Contra affair; Invasion of Grenada; Reagan Doctrine; Tear down this wall!; Invasion of Panama; Americans with Disabilities Act; Gulf War

The history of the United States from 1980 until 1991 includes the last year of the Jimmy Carter presidency, eight years of the Ronald Reagan administration, and the first three years of the George H. W. Bush presidency, up to the collapse of the Soviet Union. Plagued by the Iran hostage crisis, runaway inflation, and mounting domestic opposition, Carter lost the 1980 United States presidential election to Republican Reagan.

In his first term, Reagan introduced expansionary fiscal policies aimed at stimulating the American economy after a recession in 1981 and 1982, including oil deregulation policies which led to the 1980s oil glut. He met with Soviet leader Mikhail Gorbachev in four summit conferences, culminating with the signing of the INF Treaty. These actions accelerated the end of the Cold War, which occurred in 1989–1991, as typified by the collapse of communism both in Eastern Europe, and in the Soviet Union, and in numerous Third World clients. The economy was in recession in 1981–1983, but recovered and grew sharply after that.

The Iran–Contra affair was the most prominent scandal during this time, wherein the Reagan Administration sold weapons to Iran, and used the money for CIA aid to pro-American guerrilla Contras in left-leaning Nicaragua.

== Carter administration (1980–1981) ==
=== Changing demographics and growth of the Sun Belt ===
A widely discussed demographic phenomenon of the 1970s was the rise of the "Sun Belt", a region encapsulating the Southwest, Southeast, and especially Florida and California (surpassing New York as the nation's most populous state in 1964). By 1980, the population of the Sun Belt had risen to exceed that of the industrial regions of the Northeast and Midwest—the Rust Belt, which had steadily lost industry and had little population growth. The rise of the Sun Belt was the culmination of changes that began in American society starting in the 1950s, as cheap air travel, automobiles, the interstate system, and the growth of air conditioning all spurred a mass migration south and west. Young, working-age Americans and affluent retirees all flocked to the Sun Belt.

The rise of the Sun Belt has been producing a change in the nation's political climate, strengthening conservatism. The boom mentality in this growing region conflicted sharply with the concerns of the Rust Belt, populated mainly by those either unable or unwilling to move elsewhere, particularly minority groups and senior citizens. The Northeast and Midwest have remained more committed to social programs and more interested in regulated growth than the wide-open, sprawling states of the South and West. Electoral trends in the regions reflect this divergence—the Northeast and Midwest have been increasingly voting for Democratic candidates in federal, state and local elections while the South and West are now the solid base for the Republican Party.

As manufacturing industry gradually moved out of its traditional centers in the Northeast and Midwest, joblessness and poverty increased. The liberal response, typified by Mayor John Lindsay of New York City was to dramatically increase welfare services and education, as well as public employment and public salaries, at a time when the tax base was shrinking. New York City barely averted bankruptcy in 1975; it was rescued using state and federal money, along with strict state control of its budget.

Meanwhile, conservatives, based in the suburbs, the rural areas, and the Sunbelt railed against what they identified as the failures of liberal social programs, as well as their enormous expenses. This was a potent theme in the 1980 presidential race and the 1994 mid-term elections, when the Republicans captured the House of Representatives after 40 years of Democratic control.

The liberal leaders of the 1960s, characteristic of the era of the Great Society and the civil rights movement, gave way to conservative urban politicians in the 1970s across the country, such as New York City's Mayor, Ed Koch, a conservative Democrat.

=== Rejection of U.S./Soviet détente ===
In the 1970s, the Vietnam War and the Watergate scandal inflicted diminished confidence in the presidency. International frustrations, including the fall of South Vietnam in 1975, the Iran hostage crisis in 1979, the Soviet intervention in Afghanistan, the growth of international terrorism, and the acceleration of the arms race raised fears over the country's ability to control international affairs. The energy crisis, high unemployment, and very high inflation and escalating interest rates made economic planning difficult and raised fundamental questions over the future of American prosperity.

In the aftermath of the Iranian Revolution, a sharp drop in oil production led to the 1979 oil crisis. In response to this, Carter delivered a nationally televised speech, titled A Crisis of Confidence, in which he called for long-term limits on oil imports and the development of synthetic fuels. American "malaise", a term that caught on following his speech, in the late 1970s and early 1980s was not unfounded as the nation seemed to be losing its self-confidence.

Under the rule of Leonid Brezhnev, the Soviet economy was falling behind. The Soviets were decades behind in computers and high technology, and its economy was heavily dependent on lucrative oil exports. Meanwhile, détente with the Soviets collapsed as the communists made gains across the Third World. Most dramatic was the fall of South Vietnam in 1975 when North Vietnam invaded and conquered the nation; American forces were involved only to rescue American supporters. Nearly a million refugees fled; most who survived came to the U.S. Other Communist movements, backed by Moscow or Beijing, were spreading rapidly across Africa, Southeast Asia, and Latin America. The Soviet Union, guided by the Brezhnev Doctrine, invaded Afghanistan in 1979 in a move roundly denounced by the West and Muslim countries.

Reacting to all these perceptions of American decline internationally and domestically, a group of academics, journalists, politicians, and policymakers, labeled by many as "new conservatives" or "neoconservatives", since many of them were still Democrats, rebelled against the Democratic Party's leftward drift on defense issues in the 1970s, especially after the nomination of George McGovern in the 1972 presidential election, and blamed liberal Democrats for the nation's weakened geopolitical stance. Many clustered around Senator Henry "Scoop" Jackson, a Democrat, but they later aligned themselves with Ronald Reagan and Republicans, who promised to confront pro-Soviet Communist expansion. They were largely anti-communist Democrats and opposed to the welfare programs of the Great Society. But their main targets were the old policies of containment of communism and détente with the Soviet Union. They wanted rollback and the peaceful end of the Communist threat rather than aimless negotiations, diplomacy, and arms control.

Neoconservatives attacked the foreign policy orthodoxy of containment in the Cold War as appeasement, an allusion to the British concessions to Nazi Germany in the Munich Agreement in 1938. They regarded concessions to relatively weak enemies of the United States as appeasing "evil", attacked détente, opposed most-favored nation trade status for the Soviet Union, and supported unilateral American intervention in the Third World as a means of boosting U.S. leverage over international affairs. Before Reagan's election in November 1980, neoconservatives sought to stem the antiwar sentiments caused by the U.S. defeats in the Vietnam War and the associated massive casualties in Southeast Asia that the war induced.

During the 1970s, Jeane Kirkpatrick, a political scientist and later U.S. Ambassador to the United Nations under Ronald Reagan, increasingly criticized the Democratic Party. Kirkpatrick became a convert to the ideas of the new conservatism of once liberal Democratic academics. She drew a distinction between authoritarian dictators, who she believed were capable of embracing democracy and who were, not coincidentally, allies of the United States, and Communist totalitarian dictators, who she viewed as unyielding and incapable of change.

In the late 1970s, the U.S. was gripped by the worst economy since the 1930s with American automobile and steel industries confronting serious challenges, the ongoing Iran hostage crisis, and the Soviet Union expanding globally in Africa, Asia, Latin America, and elsewhere. In the 1980 Winter Olympics, the U.S. amateur Olympic hockey team defeated their professional Soviet counterparts in the Miracle on Ice, providing some symbolic sense of renewed American optimism.

=== Ronald Reagan and the elections of 1980 ===
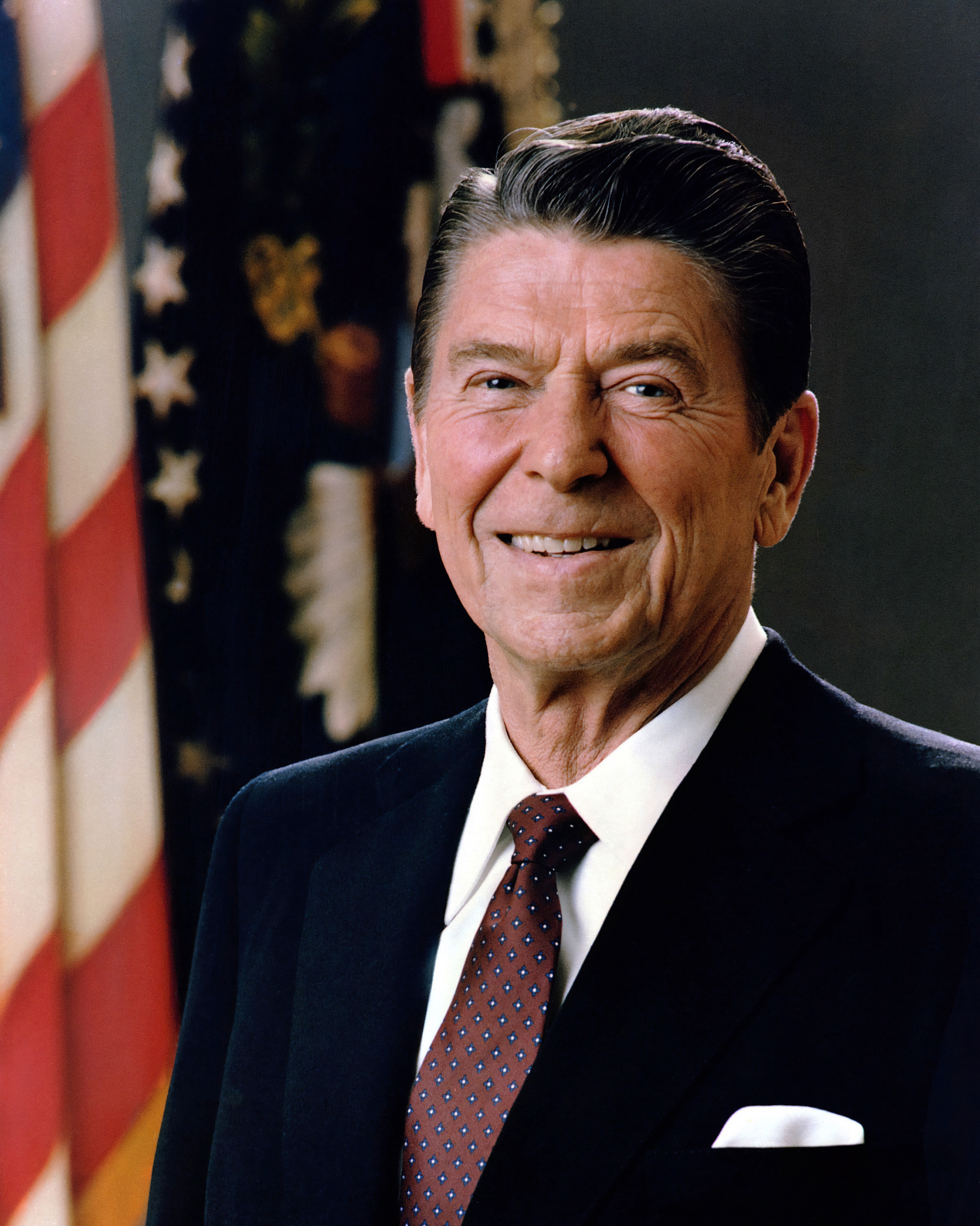
Ronald Reagan, 40th president of the United States

Conservative sentiment was growing, in part due to a disgust at the excesses of the sexual revolution and the failure of liberal policies such as the War on Poverty to deliver on their promises. President Jimmy Carter's prospects for reelection in the U.S. presidential election of 1980 were strengthened when he easily beat back a primary challenge by liberal icon Senator Edward Kennedy of Massachusetts. Against the backdrop of economic stagflation and perceived American weakness against the USSR abroad, Ronald Reagan, former governor of California, won the Republican nomination in 1980 by winning most of the primaries. After failing to reach an unprecedented deal with Ford, who wanted to be a sort of co-president, Reagan picked his chief primary rival, George H. W. Bush, as the vice-presidential nominee. During the campaign, Reagan relied on Jeane Kirkpatrick as his foreign policy adviser to identify Carter's vulnerabilities on foreign policy.

Reagan promised to rebuild the U.S. military, which had sharply declined in strength and morale after the Vietnam War, and restore American power and prestige on the international front. He also promised an end to "big government" and to restore economic health by use of supply-side economics.

Supply-side economists were against the welfare state built up by the Great Society. They asserted that the woes of the U.S. economy were in large part a result of excessive taxation, which "crowded out" money away from private investors and thus stifled economic growth. The solution, they argued, was to cut taxes across the board, particularly in the upper income brackets, in order to encourage private investment. They also aimed to reduce government spending on welfare and social services geared toward the poorer sectors of society which had built up during the 1960s.

The public, particularly the middle class in the Sun Belt region, agreed with Reagan's proposals, and voted for him in 1980. Critics charged that Reagan was insensitive to the plight of the poor, and that the economic troubles of the 1970s were beyond any president's ability to control or reverse.

The presidential election of 1980 was a key turning point in American politics. It signaled the new electoral power of the suburbs and the Sun Belt, with the Religious Right for the first time a major factor. Moreover, it was a watershed ushering out the commitment to government anti-poverty programs and affirmative action characteristic of the Great Society. It also signaled a commitment to a hawkish foreign policy.

A third-party candidacy by Representative John B. Anderson of Illinois, a moderate Republican, did poorly. The major issues of the campaign were the economic stagflation, threats to national security, the Iranian hostage crisis, and the general malaise that seemed to indicate America's great days were over. Carter seemed unable to control inflation and had failed in his rescue effort of the hostages in Tehran. Carter dropped his détente-oriented advisers and moved sharply to the right against the Soviets, but Reagan said it was too little, too late.

Reagan won a landslide victory with 489 votes in the electoral college to Carter's 49. Republicans defeated twelve Democratic senators to regain control of the Senate for the first time in 25 years. Reagan received 43,904,153 votes in the election (50.7% of total votes cast), and Carter, 35,483,883 (41.0%). John B. Anderson won 5,720,060 (6.6%) popular votes.

== Reagan administration (1981–1989) ==
According to historian David Henry, by 2010 a consensus had emerged among right-leaning academics that Reagan revived conservatism and turned the nation to the right by demonstrating a "pragmatic conservatism" that promoted ideology within the constraints imposed by the divided political system. Furthermore, says Henry, the consensus agrees that he revived faith in the presidency and American self-confidence, and contributed critically to ending the Cold War.

Reagan's approach to the presidency was somewhat of a departure from his predecessors; he delegated a great deal of work to his subordinates, letting them handle most of the government's day-to-day affairs. As an executive, Reagan framed broad themes and made a strong personal connection to voters. He used very strong aides especially chief of staff James Baker (Ford's campaign manager), and Michael Deaver as deputy chief of staff, and Edwin Meese as White House counsel, as well as David Stockman at the Bureau of the Budget and his own campaign manager Bill Casey at the CIA.

On March 30, 1981, Reagan was shot and injured by John Hinkley, Jr. in Washington D.C. Within weeks, Reagan was fully recovered.

Reagan made history by appointing the first woman to the Supreme Court, Sandra Day O'Connor in 1981. He promoted conservative leader William Rehnquist to Chief Justice in 1986, with arch-conservative Antonin Scalia taking Rehnquist's slot. His fourth appointment in 1987 proved controversial, as the initial choice had to withdraw (he smoked marijuana in college), and the Senate rejected Robert Bork. Reagan finally won approval for Anthony Kennedy.

=== Reaganomics and the 1981 federal budget ===
Ronald Reagan promised an economic revival that would affect all sectors of the population. He proposed to achieve this goal by cutting taxes and reducing the size and scope of federal programs. Critics of his plan charged that the tax cuts would reduce revenues, leading to large federal deficits, which would lead in turn to higher interest rates, stifling any economic benefits. Reagan and his supporters, drawing on the theories of supply-side economics, claimed that the tax cuts would increase revenues through economic growth, allowing the federal government to balance its budget for the first time since 1969.

Reagan's 1981 economic legislation, however, was a mixture of rival programs to satisfy all his conservative constituencies (monetarists, cold warriors, middle-class swing voters, and the affluent). Monetarists were placated by tight controls of the money supply; cold warriors, especially neoconservatives like Kirkpatrick, won large increases in the defense budget; wealthy taxpayers won sweeping three-year tax rate reductions on both individual (marginal rates would eventually come down to 50% from 70%) and corporate taxes; and the middle class saw that its pensions and entitlements would not be targeted. Reagan declared spending cuts for the Social Security budget, which accounted for almost half of government spending, off limits due to fears over an electoral backlash, but the administration was hard pressed to explain how his program of sweeping tax cuts and large defense spending would not increase the deficit.

Budget Director David Stockman raced to put Reagan's program through Congress within the administration's deadline of forty days. Stockman had no doubt that spending cuts were needed, and slashed expenditures across the board (with the exception of defense expenditures) by some $40 billion; and when figures did not add up, he resorted to the "magic asterisk"—which signified "future savings to be identified". He would later say that the program was rushed through too quickly and not given enough thought. Appeals from constituencies threatened by the loss of social services were ineffectual; the budget cuts passed through the Congress with relative ease.

=== The recession of 1982 ===
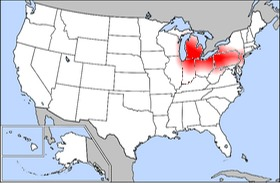
The Rust Belt is highlighted on the above map in red.

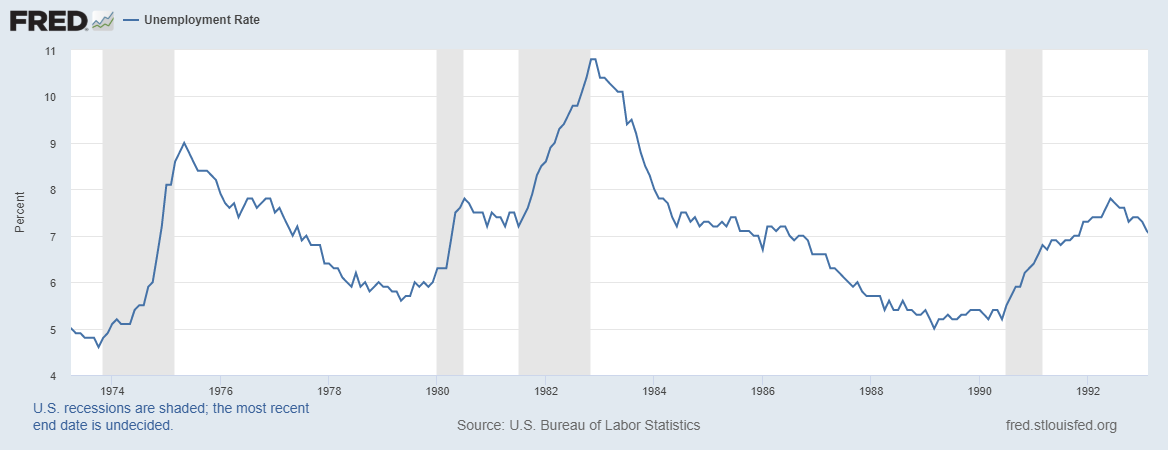
US unemployment rate, 1973–1993

By early 1982, Reagan's economic program was beset with difficulties as the recession that had begun in 1979 continued. In the short term, the effect of Reaganomics was a soaring budget deficit. Government borrowing, along with the tightening of the money supply, resulted in sky high interest rates (briefly hovering around 20 percent) and a serious recession with 10-percent unemployment in 1982. Some regions of the "Rust Belt" (the industrial Midwest and Northeast) descended into virtual depression conditions as steel mills and other industries closed. Many family farms in the Midwest and elsewhere were ruined by high interest rates and sold off to large agribusinesses.

Reagan allowed the Federal Reserve to drastically reduce the money supply to cure inflation, but it resulted in the recession deepening temporarily. His approval ratings plummeted in the worst months of the recession of 1982. Democrats swept the mid-term elections, making up for their losses in the previous election cycle. At the time, critics often accused Reagan of being out of touch. His Budget Director David Stockman, an ardent fiscal conservative, wrote, "I knew the Reagan Revolution was impossible—it was a metaphor with no anchor in political and economic reality."

Unemployment reached a peak of 11% in late 1982, after which recovery began. A factor in the recovery from the worst periods of 1982–83 was the radical drop in oil prices due to increased production levels of the mid-1980s, which ended inflationary pressures on fuel prices. The virtual collapse of the OPEC cartel enabled the administration to alter its tight money policies, to the consternation of conservative monetarist economists, who began pressing for a reduction of interest rates and an expansion of the money supply, in effect subordinating concern about inflation (which now seemed under control) to concern about unemployment and declining investment.

By the middle of 1983, unemployment fell from 11 percent in 1982 to 8.2 percent. GDP growth was 3.3 percent, the highest since the mid-1970s. Inflation was below 5 percent. When the economy recovered, Ronald Reagan declared it was Morning in America. Housing starts boomed, the automobile industry recovered its vitality, and consumer spending achieved new heights. Blue-collar workers were, however, mostly left behind in the economic boom years of the Reagan Administration, and the old factory jobs that had once offered high wages to even unskilled workers no longer existed.

Reagan went on to defeat Walter Mondale in the 1984 presidential election by a massive 49 out of 50 state landslide.

=== Rising deficits ===
Following the economic recovery that began in 1983, the medium-term fiscal effect of Reaganomics was a soaring budget deficit as spending continually exceeded revenue due to tax cuts and increased defense spending. Military budgets rose while tax revenues, despite having increased as compared to the stagnant late 1970s and early 1980s, failed to make up for the spiraling cost.

The 1981 tax cuts, some of the largest in U.S. history, also eroded the revenue base of the federal government in the short-term. The massive increase in military spending (about $1.6 trillion over five years) far exceeded cuts in social spending, despite wrenching impact of such cuts spending geared toward some of the poorest segments of society. Even so, by the end of 1985, funding for domestic programs had been cut nearly as far as Congress could tolerate.

In this context, the deficit rose from $60 billion in 1980 to a peak of $220 billion in 1986 (well over 5% of GDP). Over this period, national debt more than doubled from $749 billion to $1.746 trillion.

Since U.S. saving rates were very low (roughly one-third of Japan's), the deficit was mostly covered by borrowing from abroad, turning the United States within a few years from the world's greatest creditor nation to the world's greatest debtor. Not only was this damaging to America's status, it was also a profound shift in the postwar international financial system, which had relied on the export of U.S. capital. In addition, the media and entertainment industry during the 1980s glamorized the stock market and financial sector (e.g. the 1987 movie Wall Street), causing many young people to pursue careers as brokers, investors, or bankers instead of manufacturing and making it unlikely that any of the lost industrial base would be restored any time soon.

The deficits were keeping interest rates high (although lower than the 20% peak levels earlier in the administration due to a respite in the administration's tight money policies), and threatening to push them higher. The government was thus forced to borrow so much money to pay its bills that it was driving up the price of borrowing. Although supply-siders promised increased investment as a result of top-rate and corporate tax cuts, growth and investment suffered for now in the context of high interest rates. In October 1987, a sudden and alarming stock market crash took place, but the Federal Reserve responded by increasing the money supply and averted what could have been another Great Depression.

Perhaps more alarmingly, Reagan-era deficits were keeping the U.S. dollar overvalued. With such a high demand for dollars (due in large measure to government borrowing), the dollar achieved an alarming strength against other major currencies. As the dollar soared in value, American exports became increasingly uncompetitive, with Japan as the leading beneficiary. The high value of the dollar made it difficult for foreigners to buy American goods and encouraged Americans to buy imports, coming at a high price to the industrial export sector. Steel and other heavy industries declined due to excessive demands by labor unions and outdated technology that made them unable to compete with Japanese imports. The consumer electronics industry (which had begun declining in the 1970s) was one of the worst victims of dumping and other unfair Japanese trade practices. American consumer electronics also suffered from poor quality and a relative lack of technical innovation compared to Japanese electronics, in part because the Cold War had caused most American scientific and engineering effort to go into the defense sector rather than the consumer one. By the end of the decade, it had virtually ceased to exist. On the bright side, the upstart computer industry flourished during the 1980s.

The U.S. balance of trade grew increasingly unfavorable; the trade deficit grew from $20 billion to well over $100 billion. Thus, American industries such as automobiles and steel, faced renewed competition abroad and within the domestic market as well. The auto industry was given breathing space after the Reagan administration imposed voluntary import restraints on Japanese manufacturers (allowing them to sell a maximum of 1.3 million vehicles in the U.S. per year) and imposed a 25% tariff on all imported trucks (a lighter 3% tariff was put on passenger cars). The Japanese responded by opening assembly plants in the U.S. to get around this, and in doing so were able to say that they were providing Americans with jobs. The VIR was repealed in 1985 after auto sales were booming again, but the tariffs remain in effect to this day. With the event of CAFE regulations, small cars came to dominate in the 1980s, and much like with electronics, Japanese makes bested American ones in terms of build quality and technical sophistication.

The enormous deficits were in large measure holdovers from Lyndon Johnson's commitment to both "guns and butter" (the Vietnam War and the Great Society) and the growing competition from other G7 nations after their postwar reconstruction, but it was the Reagan administration that chose to let the deficits develop.

Reagan asked Congress for a line-item veto which would allow him to lower the deficits by cutting spending that he thought was wasteful, but he did not receive it. He also called for a balanced budget amendment which would mandate that the federal government spends no more money than it takes in, which never materialized.

=== Reagan and the world ===
==== Foreign policy: Third World ====
With Reagan's promises to restore the nation's military strength, the 1980s saw massive increases in military spending, amounting to about $1.6 trillion over five years. A new arms race would develop as superpower relations deteriorated to a level not seen since the Kennedy administration a generation earlier.

Reagan's foreign policy was generally considered more successful and more thoughtful and strategic than his predecessor. He favored a hawkish approach to the Cold War, especially in the Third World arena of superpower competition. In the wake of the Vietnam War, however, Americans were increasingly skeptical of bearing the economic and financial cost of large troop commitments. The administration sought to overcome this by backing the relatively cheap strategy of specially trained counterinsurgencies or "low-intensity conflicts" rather than large-scale campaigns like Korea and Vietnam, which were enormously costly both in money and human life.

The Arab–Israeli conflict was another impetus for military action. Israel invaded Lebanon to destroy the Palestine Liberation Organization (PLO). But in the wake of the 1982 Sabra and Shatila Massacre, which provoked a political crisis in Israel, U.S. forces moved into Beirut to encourage Israeli withdrawal. The Reagan administration stood by Israel's invasion of Lebanon in mid-1982 to maintain the support of Israel on one hand, but also to quell the influence of Israel's pro-Soviet enemy Syria in Lebanon. However, U.S. intervention in the multi-sided Lebanese civil war had disastrous consequences. On October 23, 1983, the Marine Barracks Bombing killed 241 American troops. Shortly afterward, the U.S. withdrew its remaining 1,600 soldiers.

In Operation Urgent Fury in the Caribbean nation of Grenada, the United States for the first time invaded and successfully rolled back a Communist regime. On October 19, the small island nation of Grenada had undergone a coup d'état by Bernard Coard, a staunch Marxist–Leninist seeking to strengthen the country's existing ties with Cuba, the Soviet Union, and other Communist states. The prime minister was killed and insurgents had orders to shoot on sight. Over 1,000 Americans were on the island, mostly medical students and their families, and the government could not guarantee their security. The Organisation of Eastern Caribbean States, the regional security association of neighboring states led by Prime Minister Eugenia Charles of Dominica officially called on the United States for protection. In a short campaign launched Oct. 25, fought primarily against armed Cuban construction workers, the U.S. military invaded and took control, and democracy was restored to Grenada.

In 1986, Reagan launched an air strike against Libya after Libya's Muammar Gaddafi was found to have connections to the West Berlin discotheque bombing, which killed two American soldiers.

The Reagan administration also supplied funds and weapons to heavily militarily-influenced governments in El Salvador beginning in 1980 and Honduras, and to a lesser extent in Guatemala, which was ruled by right-wing military autocrat General Efraín Ríos Montt from 1982–83. It reversed ex-President Jimmy Carter's official condemnation of the Argentine junta for human rights abuses and allowed the CIA to collaborate with Argentine intelligence in funding the Contras.

Central America was the Reagan administration's primary concern, especially El Salvador and Nicaragua, where the Sandinista revolution brought down U.S.-backed Anastasio Somoza Debayle's rule in 1979. The two countries had been historically dominated by multinational corporations and wealthy landowning oligarchs while most of their population remained in poverty; as a result, predominantly Marxist revolutionary leaders had won increasing support from the peasantry in both nations.

In 1982, the CIA, with assistance from the Argentine national intelligence agency, organized and financed right-wing paramilitaries in Nicaragua, known as the Contras. The tracing of secret funds for this scheme led to the revelations of the Iran–Contra affair. In 1985, Reagan authorized the sale of arms in Iran in an unsuccessful effort to free U.S. hostages in Lebanon; he later professed ignorance that subordinates were illegally diverting the proceeds to the Contras, a matter for which Marine Lieutenant Colonel Oliver North, an aide to National Security Advisor John M. Poindexter, took much of the blame. Reagan's approval ratings plummeted in 1986 as a result of the scandal, and many Americans began to seriously question his judgement. While the president's popularity improved in his final two years, he never again enjoyed the level of support he had had in 1985. Democrats regained control of Congress in the 1986 midterm elections. Oliver North, meanwhile, achieved a brief celebrity status in 1987 during his testimonies before Congress.

In sub-Saharan Africa, the Reagan administration, with help from apartheid South Africa, also attempted to topple the substantially Cuban and Soviet-backed Marxist–Leninist FRELIMO and MPLA dictatorships of Mozambique and Angola, respectively, during those countries' civil wars. The administration intervened on the side of insurgent groups RENAMO in Mozambique and UNITA in Angola, supplying each group with covert military and humanitarian aid.

In Afghanistan, Reagan massively stepped up military and humanitarian aid for mujahideen fighters against the Soviet proxy government there, providing them with Stinger anti-aircraft missiles. U.S. allies Saudi Arabia and Pakistan also provided the rebels with significant assistance. General Secretary Mikhail Gorbachev reduced and eventually ended his country's commitment to Afghanistan as Soviet troops there were bogged down in guerrilla war.

Reagan also expressed opposition to the Vietnamese-installed Communist regime of Heng Samrin (and later, Hun Sen) in Cambodia, which had ousted the genocidal Khmer Rouge regime after Vietnam invaded the country. The administration approved military and humanitarian aid to the republican KPNLF and royalist Funcinpec insurgents. The Reagan administration also supported continued UN recognition of the Coalition Government of Democratic Kampuchea (a tripartite rebel alliance of the KPNLF, Funcinpec, and the Khmer Rouge) over the Vietnamese-backed People's Republic of Kampuchea regime. Reagan also continued American support for the autocratic Philippine President Ferdinand Marcos, an ardent anti-Communist. In a 1984 presidential debate sponsored by the League of Women Voters, he explained his administration's support of Marcos by stating, "I know there are things there in the Philippines that do not look good to us from the standpoint right now of democratic rights, but what is the alternative? It is a large communist movement" , referring to active Communist guerrillas operating in the Philippines at the time. The U.S. also had significant strategic military interests in the Philippines, knowing that Marcos's government would not tamper with agreements to maintain U.S. naval bases in the country. Marcos was later ousted in 1986 by the mostly peaceful People Power movement, led by Corazón Aquino.

Reagan was sharply critical of the United Nations, once the darling of liberals. He repudiated what he felt was its corruption, inefficiency and anti-Americanism. In 1985–1987 the U.S. withdrew from UNESCO, which had failed in its cultural missions, and began to deliberately withhold its UN dues. American policymakers considered this tactic an effective tool for asserting influence in the UN. When the UN and UNESCO mended their ways, the U.S. returned and paid its dues.

==== Last stage of the Cold War ====
The Reagan administration adopted a hard-line stance toward the USSR. Early in his first term, the president attacked the rival superpower as the "evil empire". While it was Jimmy Carter who had officially ended the policy of détente following Soviet intervention in Afghanistan, East-West tensions in the early 1980s reached levels not seen since the Cuban Missile Crisis. The Strategic Defense Initiative (SDI) was born out of the worsening U.S.-Soviet relations of the Reagan Era. Popularly dubbed "Star Wars" at the time, SDI was a multibillion-dollar research project for a missile defense system that could shoot down incoming Soviet missiles and eliminate the need for mutually assured destruction.

While the Soviets had enjoyed great achievements on the international stage before Reagan entered office in 1981, such as the unification of their socialist ally, Vietnam, in 1976, and a string of socialist revolutions in Southeast Asia, Latin America, and Africa, the country's strengthening ties with Third World nations in the 1960s and 1970s only masked its weakness. The Soviet economy suffered severe structural problems and started suffering from an increased stagnation in the 1970s. Documents being circulated in the Kremlin in 1980, when Carter was still president, expressed the bleak view that Moscow ultimately could not win the technological or ideological battle with the US.

East-West tensions eased rapidly after the rise of Mikhail Gorbachev. After the deaths of three elderly Soviet leaders in a row since 1982, the Politburo elected Gorbachev Soviet Communist Party chief in 1985, marking the rise of a new generation of leadership. Under Gorbachev, relatively young reform-oriented technocrats rapidly consolidated power, providing new momentum for political and economic liberalization, and the impetus for cultivating warmer relations and trade with the West.

Focused on perestroika, Gorbachev struggled to boost production of consumer goods, which would be impossible given the twin burdens of the Cold War arms race on one hand, and the provision of large sums of foreign and military aid, which the socialist allies had grown to expect, on the other. Under Gorbachev, Soviet policymakers increasingly accepted Reagan administration warnings that the U.S. would make the arms race a huge burden for them. The Soviets were already spending massive amounts on defense, and developing a counterpart to SDI was far more than their economy could handle. The result in the Soviet Union was a dual approach of concessions to the United States and economic restructuring (perestroika) and democratization (glasnost) domestically, which eventually made it impossible for Gorbachev to reassert central control. Reaganite hawks have since argued that pressures stemming from increased U.S. defense spending was an additional impetus for reform.

During the Cold War, the division of the world into two rival blocs had served to legitimize a broad and diffuse alliance not only with the Western European nations of the North Atlantic Treaty Organization (NATO) but many countries in the developing world. Starting in the late 1980s, however, the regimes of the Eastern European Warsaw Pact began to collapse in rapid succession. The "fall of the Berlin Wall" was seen as a symbol of the fall of the Eastern European Communist governments in 1989. U.S.-Soviet relations had greatly improved in the latter half of the decade, with the signing of the Intermediate-Range Nuclear Forces Treaty (INF) in 1987 and the withdrawal of Soviet forces from Afghanistan as well as Cuban forces from Angola. These developments undercut the rationale for providing support to such repressive governments as those in Chile and South Korea, which underwent processes of democratization with U.S. support during the same period as those of Warsaw Pact nations.

== George H. W. Bush administration (1989–1991) ==
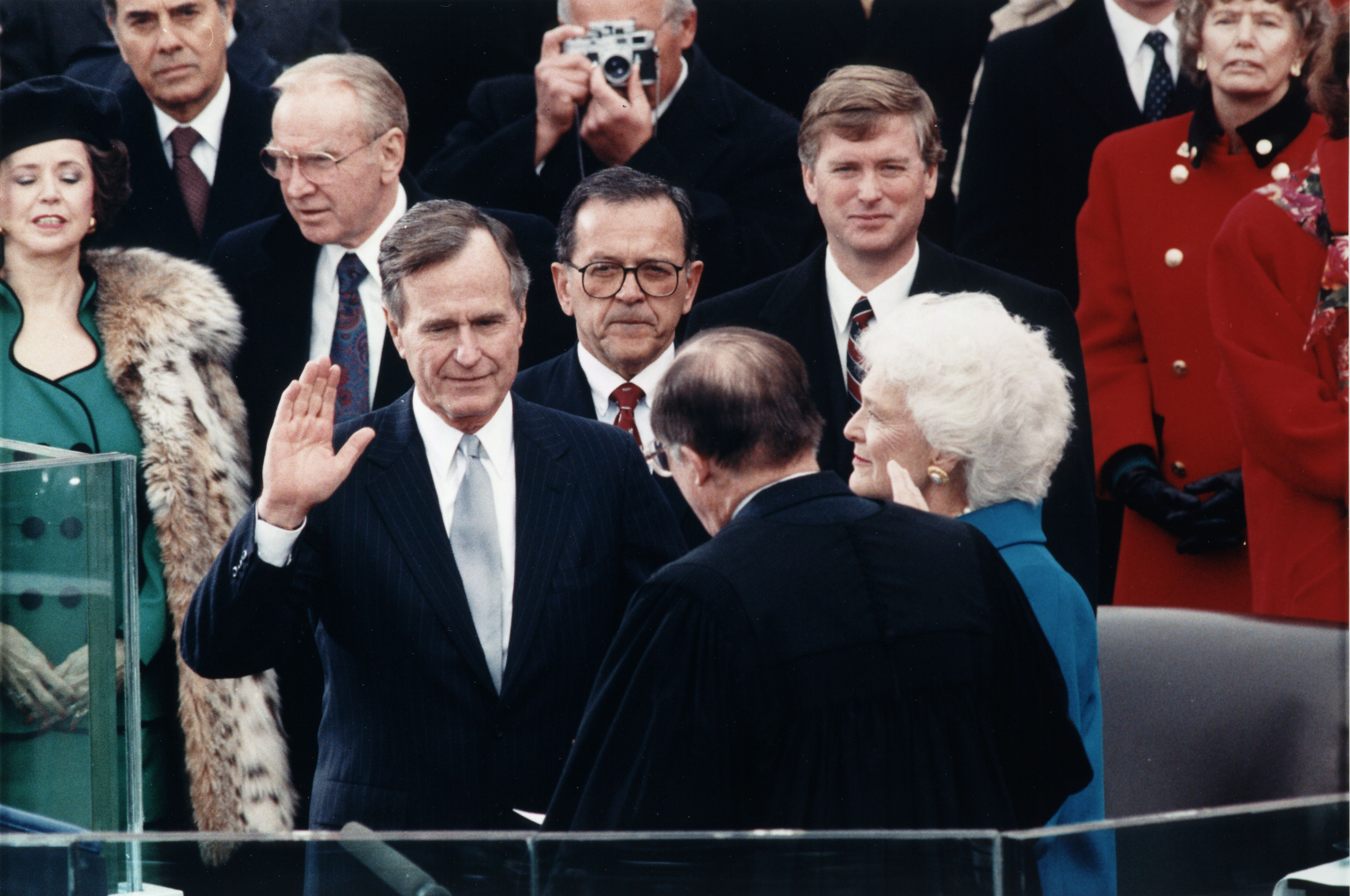
Inauguration of George H. W. Bush

Reagan's vice-president George H. W. Bush easily won the 1988 Republican nomination and defeated Democratic Massachusetts governor Michael Dukakis by an electoral landslide in the 1988 election. The campaign was marked by numerous blunders by Dukakis, including most famously a campaign ad featuring Dukakis in an M1 Abrams tank.

=== Foreign affairs ===
Unlike Reagan, Bush downplayed vision and emphasized caution and careful management. His main foreign policy advisors were Secretaries of State James Baker and Lawrence Eagleburger, and National Security Advisor Brent Scowcroft. Bush entered the White House with a long and successful portfolio in foreign affairs including ambassadorial roles to China in the United Nations, director of the CIA, and official visits to 65 foreign countries as vice president.

Momentous geopolitical events that occurred during Bush's presidency include:

- The crushing in June 1989 of the Tiananmen Square protests in China, which was widely condemned in the United States and around the world.
- The United States invasion of Panama in December 1989 to overthrow a local dictator.
- The signing with the USSR of the START I and START II treaties for nuclear disarmament.
- The Gulf War in 1991, in which Bush led a large coalition that defeated Iraq when it invaded Kuwait.
- Victory in the Cold War over Soviet communism.
- Revolutions of 1989 and the collapse of Communism, especially in Eastern Europe
- German reunification in 1990, with the democratic West absorbing the ex-Communist East.
- The dissolution of the Soviet Union in 1991, replaced by a friendly Russia and 14 other countries.

Except for the Tiananmen Square massacre in China, all the events strongly favored the United States. Bush took the initiative in the invasion of Panama and the START treaties. Otherwise, he was mostly a passive observer trying not to interfere or gloat about the events. Given the favorable outcomes, scholars generally give Bush high marks in foreign policy, except for his unwillingness to condemn the Tiananmen Square crackdown. He thought long-term favorable relations with China were too important to jeopardize. In terms of gaining public support, Bush never tried to mobilize much popular support for his foreign policy, and in domestic affairs his support was steadily slipping.

=== After the Cold War ===
Bush argued for the emergence of "a new world order... freer from the threat of terror, stronger in the pursuit of justice, and more secure in the quest for peace. An era in which the nations of the world, East and West, North and South, can prosper and live in harmony."

Nationalist agitation in the Baltic States for independence led to first Lithuania and then the other two states, Estonia and Latvia, declaring independence from the USSR. On December 26, 1991, the USSR was officially disbanded, breaking up into fifteen constituent parts. The Cold War was over, and the vacuum left by the collapse of governments such as in Yugoslavia and Somalia revealed or reopened other animosities concealed by decades of authoritarian rule. While there was a certain reluctance among the U.S. public, and even within the government, to get involved in localized conflicts in which there was little or no direct U.S. interest at stake, these crises served as a basis for the renewal of Western alliances while communism was becoming less relevant. To this effect, President Bill Clinton would declare in his inaugural address: "Today, as an old order passes, the new world is more free but less stable. Communism's collapse has called forth old animosities and new dangers. Clearly America must continue to lead the world we did so much to make."

Since the end of the Cold War, the U.S. has sought to revitalize Cold War institutional structures, especially NATO, as well as multilateral institutions such as the International Monetary Fund and World Bank through which it promotes economic reforms around the globe. NATO was set to expand initially to Hungary, Poland, and the Czech Republic and has since moved further eastward. In addition, U.S. policy placed a special emphasis on the neoliberal "Washington Consensus", manifesting in the North American Free Trade Agreement (NAFTA), which went into effect in 1994.

The U.S. often made moves to economically sanction countries which were said to be sponsoring terrorism, engaging in the proliferation of weapons of mass destruction or committing serious human rights abuses. There was sometimes a consensus for these moves, such as with the U.S. and European embargoes imposed on arms sales to China after its violent suppression of the Tiananmen Square protests of 1989, as well as for the UN Security Council's imposition of sanctions on Iraq after its invasion of Kuwait. Support for other unilateral sanctions however, such as the ones levied on Iran and Cuba, were limited, leading Congress to impose measures intended to punish foreign companies which violated the terms of the U.S.'s own laws. In a 1999 Foreign Affairs essay, Samuel P. Huntington wrote that to reinforce its primacy in the post–Cold War world,

the United States has, among other things, attempted or been perceived as attempting more or less unilaterally to do the following: pressure other countries to adopt American values and practices regarding human rights and democracy; prevent other countries from acquiring military capabilities that could counter American conventional superiority; enforce American law extra-territorially in other societies; grade countries according to their adherence to American standards on human rights, drugs, terrorism, nuclear proliferation, missile proliferation, and now religious freedom; apply sanctions against countries that do not meet American standards on these issues; promote American corporate interests under the slogans of free trade and open markets [NAFTA and GATT being the main examples of the free trade policy initiatives of the 1990s; shape World Bank and International Monetary Fund policies to serve those same corporate interests; intervene in local conflicts in which it has relatively little direct interest; ... ; promote American arms sales abroad while attempting to prevent comparable sales by other countries; force out one U.N. secretary-general and dictate the appointment of his successor; expand NATO...undertake military action against Iraq and later maintain harsh economic sanctions against the regime; and categorize certain countries as 'rogue states,' excluding them from global institutions....^{1}

Max Boot, another influential contemporary commentator on U.S. policy, argues that the very ambitious goals of the U.S. in the post–Cold War period are designed:

to instill democracy in lands that have known tyranny, in the hope that doing so will short-circuit terrorism, military aggression, and weapons proliferation....This is an ambitious undertaking, the most successful examples of which are post–World War II Germany, Italy and Japan. In those cases, the U.S. Army helped transform militaristic dictatorships into pillars of liberal democracy—one of the most significant developments of the twentieth century."

=== Economics ===
Initially, Bush inherited an economy that continued the strong rally that had begun in the final months of 1982. However, the Federal Reserve continued with restrictive monetary policy, limiting economic growth in the late 1980s. When the 1990 oil price shock hit in mid-1990, consumer spending contracted and the economy entered recession. Unlike the early 1980s recession, the recession beginning in 1990 was relatively mild. Some of the hardest hit areas were in California and the Northeast, while much of the South was less affected.

== See also ==
- Fifth Party System
- Reagan Era
- Sixth Party System
- Presidency of Jimmy Carter
- Presidency of Ronald Reagan
- Presidency of George H. W. Bush
- Timeline of the history of the United States (1970–1989)
- Timeline of the history of the United States (1990–2009)
