= Booknotes =

US television program

- Genre: Talk show
- Presented by: Brian Lamb
- Country of origin: United States
- Original language: English
- No. of seasons: 16
- No. of episodes: 801

Production
- Running time: 60 minutes

Original release
- Network: C-SPAN
- Release: April 2, 1989 – December 5, 2004

Booknotes is an American television series on the C-SPAN network hosted by Brian Lamb, which originally aired from 1989 to 2004. The format of the show is a one-hour, one-on-one interview with a non-fiction author. The series was broadcast at 8 p.m. Eastern Time each Sunday night, and was the longest-running author interview program in U.S. broadcast history.

== Background and production ==
=== History ===
Booknotes debuted on April 2, 1989. The first guest was former United States National Security Advisor Zbigniew Brzezinski, discussing The Grand Failure: The Birth and Death of Communism in the Twentieth Century. The fifth anniversary was marked on April 10, 1994 with a special two-hour show featuring over 50 of the 300 authors previously featured on the program. For the tenth anniversary of Booknotes in 1999, Brian Lamb compiled and edited an anthology of stories on 78 people who influenced American history from the 18th century to 1999. Titled Booknotes: Life Stories, each contributed story was written by a well-known biographer.

After 801 interviews, the final broadcast aired 5 December 2004. Lamb's guest was Mark Edmundson, author of Why Read?, professor of English at the University of Virginia and a contributing editor at Harper's Magazine. The show was intended to end with the 800th episode, but due to a miscalculation, the final program was actually the 801st.

Booknotes segments continue to be re-aired on C-SPAN's companion network C-SPAN 2, during Saturday Book TV broadcasts, while C-SPAN 3 airs repeat segments every weeknight at 11 p.m. Pacific Time. All 801 transcripts are available online and the 801 shows can be viewed online via the Booknotes website. Lamb's own copies of the Booknotes books, most of which contain his personal marginalia, are housed in the rare books collection of George Mason University.

=== Development ===
The Booknotes concept grew out of a one-off interview special with Neil Sheehan, author of A Bright Shining Lie, in September 1988. The interview itself resulted from Lamb having viewed a short commercial television interview with Sheehan and wanting to hear more. According to Lamb, a strong viewer response to the program led to the decision to start producing a weekly author interview program.

=== Format ===
Each Booknotes episode devoted one full hour to an interview with the author of a recently released non-fiction book. In order to avoid duplicate appearances by any one author, each guest appeared only once on the program, thus allowing for over 800 different authors to be interviewed every week over a fifteen-year stretch. The hour-long interviews explored authors' work habits, thoughts and lives, while also covering the intentions of their book and how, or if, these were achieved.

=== Production ===
Research for the interviews was simple: producers identified subjects, arranged for them to appear and Brian Lamb would then read the book in the week prior to the interview. One reason for discontinuing the series, according to Lamb, was the time constraints imposed by reading an entire book every seven days.

The set where Booknotes was recorded was similarly basic, comprising a black backdrop, two armchairs and a coffee table.

=== Awards ===
In February 2003, Lamb was awarded the National Humanities Medal. In November 2007, Lamb received the Presidential Medal of Freedom for his work on C-SPAN. The American Historical Association awarded Lamb the 2004 Theodore Roosevelt-Woodrow Wilson Award "for extraordinary contributions to the study, teaching, and public understanding of history."

== Guests ==
Notable guests appearing on Booknotes to discuss their published writings have included Hillary Clinton, Pat Buchanan, Colin Powell, Frank McCourt, Dixy Lee Ray and David Crosby. A number of former presidents have appeared on the program, including Richard Nixon on February 23, 1992, Jimmy Carter on February 19, 1995 and Bill Clinton on December 15, 1996. In addition to the U.S. presidents who were interviewed for Booknotes, former UK Prime Minister Margaret Thatcher also appeared on the program.

While the majority of Booknotes subjects have been authors of books on history, politics or public policy, exceptions included the violinist Isaac Stern, who discussed his memoir, My First 79 Years, on the program on January 23, 2000.

== Books ==
External videos
- Charlie Rose interview with Brian Lamb, Stanley Crouch, David Halberstam, and Pete Hamill on Booknotes: America's Finest Authors on Reading, Writing and the Power of Ideas, July 8, 1997

Including Booknotes: Life Stories, four books have been drawn from the series, with content either comprising original material or taken directly from transcripts of Booknotes interviews. Booknotes: America's Finest Authors on Reading, Writing and the Power of Ideas is a compilation of short monologues taken from the transcripts of Brian Lamb’s best interviews. The other two books are Booknotes: On American Character and Booknotes: Stories from American History.

- Booknotes: America's Finest Authors on Reading, Writing and the Power of Ideas (1998)
- Booknotes: Life Stories (2000)
- Booknotes: Stories from American History (2002)
- Booknotes: On American Character (2005)
