= List of Booknotes interviews first aired in 2002 =

Booknotes is an American television series on the C-SPAN network hosted by Brian Lamb, which originally aired from 1989 to 2004. The format of the show is a one-hour, one-on-one interview with a non-fiction author. The series was broadcast at 8 p.m. Eastern Time each Sunday night, and was the longest-running author interview program in U.S. broadcast history.

First broadcast (with link to transcript / video)	Author	Book	Subject matter
January 6, 2002	Bill Press	Spin This! All The Ways We Don’t Tell the Truth	Spin (public relations)
January 13, 2002	Jeffrey Hart	Smiling Through the Cultural Catastrophe: Toward the Revival of Higher Education	Western canon; Higher education in the United States
January 20, 2002	John Laurence	The Cat From Hue: A Vietnam War Story	The Vietnam War
January 27, 2002	Sandra Day O’Connor	Lazy B: Growing Up On a Cattle Ranch in the American Southwest	Memoir/Autobiography; Duncan, Arizona; Ranching
February 3, 2002	Ralph Nader	Crashing the Party: How to Tell the Truth and Still Run for President	Memoir/Autobiography; 2000 United States presidential election; Ralph Nader presidential campaign, 2000
February 10, 2002	Steve Neal	Harry & Ike: The Partnership That Remade the Postwar World	Harry Truman; Dwight Eisenhower
February 17, 2002	Edward Steers Jr.	Blood on the Moon: The Assassination of Abraham Lincoln	The Assassination of Abraham Lincoln
February 24, 2002	R. Kent Newmyer	John Marshall and the Heroic Age of the Supreme Court	John Marshall
March 3, 2002	Randall Kennedy	Nigger: The Strange Career of a Troublesome Word	Use of the word "Nigger"
March 10, 2002	Richard Lingeman	Sinclair Lewis: Rebel From Mainstreet	Sinclair Lewis
March 17, 2002	Michael Novak	On Two Wings: Humble Faith and Common Sense at the American Founding	History of religion in the United States; Founding Fathers of the United States
March 24, 2002	Jon Ronson	Them: Adventures with Extremists	Conspiracy Theories; Extremism
March 31, 2002	Frank Wu	Yellow: Race in America Beyond Black and White	Asian Americans
April 7, 2002	Leonard Downie Jr., Co-Author	The News About the News: American Journalism in Peril	Journalism
April 14, 2002	Ellen Joan Pollock	The Pretender: How Martin Frankel Fooled the Financial World and Led the Feds on One of the Most Publicized Manhunts in History	Martin Frankel
April 21, 2002	Gordon Wood	The American Revolution: A History	The American Revolution
April 28, 2002	Robert Skidelsky	John Maynard Keynes: Fighting for Freedom, 1937-1946	John Maynard Keynes
May 5, 2002	Sarah Brady	A Good Fight	James Brady; Brady Handgun Violence Prevention Act; Gun politics in the United States
May 12, 2002	Jennifer Toth	What Happened to Johnnie Jordan? The Story of A Child Turning Violent	Causes and correlates of crime; Foster care
May 19, 2002	James Srodes	Franklin: The Essential Founding Father	Benjamin Franklin
May 26, 2002	Richard John Neuhaus	As I Lay Dying: Meditations Upon Returning	Death
June 2, 2002	Richard Posner	Public Intellectuals: A Study of Decline	Public intellectuals
June 9, 2002	Jennet Conant	Tuxedo Park: A Wall Street Tycoon and the Secret Palace of Science that Changed the Course of World War II	Alfred Lee Loomis
June 16, 2002	Samantha Power	A Problem From Hell: America and the Age of Genocide	Genocide; United States non-interventionism
June 23, 2002	Diana Preston	Lusitania: An Epic Tragedy	The RMS Lusitania
June 30, 2002	John Leonard	Lonesome Rangers: Homeless Minds, Promised Lands, Fugitive Cultures	Essays; Intellectuals; Exile; Expatriates
July 7, 2002	Sandra Mackey	The Reckoning: Iraq and the Legacy of Saddam Hussein	Iraq; Saddam Hussein
July 14, 2002	Nguyen Cao Ky	Buddha’s Child: My Fight to Save Vietnam	Vietnam
July 21, 2002	Daniel Stashower	The Boy Genius and the Mogul: The Untold Story of Television	Philo T. Farnsworth; David Sarnoff; History of Television
July 28, 2002	Beppe Severgnini	Ciao America! An Italian Discovers the U.S.	Culture of the United States
August 4, 2002	Glenn Loury	The Anatomy of Racial Inequality	Race in the United States
August 11, 2002	Ann Coulter	Slander: Liberal Lies About the American Right	Media bias in the United States; American Left; Conservatism in the United States
August 18, 2002	Simon Worrall	The Poet and the Murderer	Mark Hofmann
August 25, 2002	Michael Oren	Six Days of War: June 1967 and the Making of the Modern Middle East	The Six-Day War
September 1, 2002	Winston Groom	A Storm in Flanders: The Ypres Salient, 1914-1918—Tragedy and Triumph on the Western Front	Ypres Salient; First Battle of Ypres; Second Battle of Ypres; Battle of Passchendaele; Battle of the Lys (1918); Fifth Battle of Ypres
September 8, 2002	Dennis Hutchinson	The Forgotten Memoir of John Knox: A Year in the Life of a Supreme Court Clerk in FDR's Washington	John Frush Knox
September 15, 2002	Arnold Ludwig	King of the Mountain: The Nature of Political Leadership	Leadership; Politics; Heads of state; Heads of government
September 22, 2002	Eliot Cohen	Supreme Command: Soldiers, Statesmen, and Leadership in Wartime	Civilian control of the military; Abraham Lincoln; Georges Clemenceau; Winston Churchill; David Ben-Gurion
September 29, 2002	Pete Davies	American Road: The Story of An Epic Transcontinental Journey at the Dawn of the Motor Age	Transcontinental Motor Convoy
October 6, 2002	Zig Ziglar	Zig: The Autobiography of Zig Ziglar	Memoir/Autobiography; Sales; Motivational speaking
October 13, 2002	Linda Greenlaw	The Lobster Chronicles: Life On a Very Small Island	Lobstering; Maine
October 20, 2002	Michael Mandelbaum	The Ideas That Conquered the World: Peace, Democracy, and Free Markets in the Twenty-first Century	Globalization; Peace; Democracy; Free market economics
October 27, 2002	Charles Slack	Noble Obsession: Charles Goodyear, Thomas Hancock, and the Race to Unlock the Greatest Industrial Secret of the Nineteenth Century	Charles Goodyear; Thomas Hancock; Vulcanization
November 3, 2002	Caryle Murphy	Passion for Islam: Shaping the Modern Middle East—The Egyptian Experience	Islam in Egypt
November 10, 2002	Frank Williams	Judging Lincoln	Abraham Lincoln
November 17, 2002	Rick Atkinson	An Army at Dawn: The War in North Africa, 1942-1943	North African Campaign; Operation Torch
November 24, 2002	Peter Krass	Carnegie	Andrew Carnegie
December 1, 2002	Bruce Feiler	Abraham: A Journey to the Heart of Three Faiths	Abraham; Abrahamic religions
December 8, 2002	Michelle Malkin	Invasion: How America Still Welcomes Terrorists, Criminals and Other Foreign Menaces to Our Shores	Immigration to the United States; Illegal immigration to the United States
December 15, 2002	John Taliaferro	Great White Fathers: The Story of the Obsessive Quest to Create Mt. Rushmore	Gutzon Borglum; Mount Rushmore; Construction of Mount Rushmore
December 22, 2002	Diana Walker	Public & Private: Twenty Years of Photographing the Presidency	Photojournalism
December 29, 2002	Margaret MacMillan	Paris 1919: Six Months That Changed the World	Paris Peace Conference, 1919
