= Martin Kilson =

African American political scientist (1931–2019)

- Born: Martin Luther Kilson Jr. February 14, 1931; East Rutherford, New Jersey, U.S.
- Died: April 24, 2019 (aged 88); Lincoln, Massachusetts, U.S.
- Spouse: Marion Dusser de Barenne

Academic background
- Education: Lincoln University; Harvard University

Academic work
- Main interests: African-American studies, African studies

Martin Luther Kilson Jr. (February 14, 1931 – April 24, 2019) was an American political scientist. He was the first black academic to be appointed a full professor at Harvard University, where he was later the Frank G. Thomson Professor of Government from 1988 until his retirement in 1999.

== Early life ==
Martin Luther Kilson Jr. was born on February 14, 1931, in East Rutherford, New Jersey, to Martin and Louisa Kilson. The family moved to Ambler, Pennsylvania, and the younger Kilson attended Ambler High School before graduating at the top of his class at Lincoln University, where he earned a bachelor's degree in political science in 1953.

He was granted a John Hay Whitney Fellowship and completed his education at Harvard University, graduating with a master's degree in 1958 and a doctorate the following year. Kilson used a Ford Foundation Fellowship to undertake field research in West Africa.

== Career ==
Kilson returned to Harvard and accepted a lectureship at the university in 1962; he was appointed assistant professor in 1967. Two years later, he became Harvard's first fully tenured African-American academic. Kilson was awarded a Guggenheim Fellowship in 1975 and became the Frank G. Thomson Professor of Government at Harvard in 1988. At the start of his academic career, Kilson became known for his research into African American studies, and became an adviser for the Association of African and Afro-American Students at Harvard. Kilson also compiled works relating to comparative politics, focusing within the field on African studies. Kilson's 1966 book, Political Change in a West African State: A Study of the Modernization Process in Sierra Leone, was reviewed extensively.

After retiring from teaching in 1999, Kilson continued to write and occasionally lecture. In 2002, he wrote a review for The Black Commentator critical of Randall Kennedy for the title of his book, Nigger: The Strange Career of a Troublesome Word. In 2010, Kilson was featured in Harvard's annual W. E. B. DuBois lectures. He also wrote his final book, The Transformation of the African American Intelligentsia, 1880–2012, which was published in 2014.

== Personal life ==
Kilson and his wife Marion Dusser de Barenne had three children and they lived in Lexington, Massachusetts. He died on April 24, 2019, from congestive heart failure. His alma mater Lincoln University had planned to present Kilson with an honorary degree at its commencement ceremony in spring 2019.

== Selected bibliography ==
- Political Change in a West African State (2014 reprint ed.). Harvard University Press. 1966. ISBN 978-0-674-49807-5.
- New States in the Modern World. Harvard University Press. January 1, 1975. ISBN 978-0-674-62261-6.
- The Transformation of the African American Intelligentsia, 1880–2012. Harvard University Press. June 17, 2014. ISBN 978-0-674-28354-1.
