= Culture of corruption =

Culture of corruption may refer to:

- Culture of Corruption: Obama and His Team of Tax Cheats, Crooks, and Cronies, a book by Michelle Malkin
- Culture of corruption, a political slogan used during the 2006 Republican party scandals
