= Hatpin =

Long pin worn to secure or decorate a hat

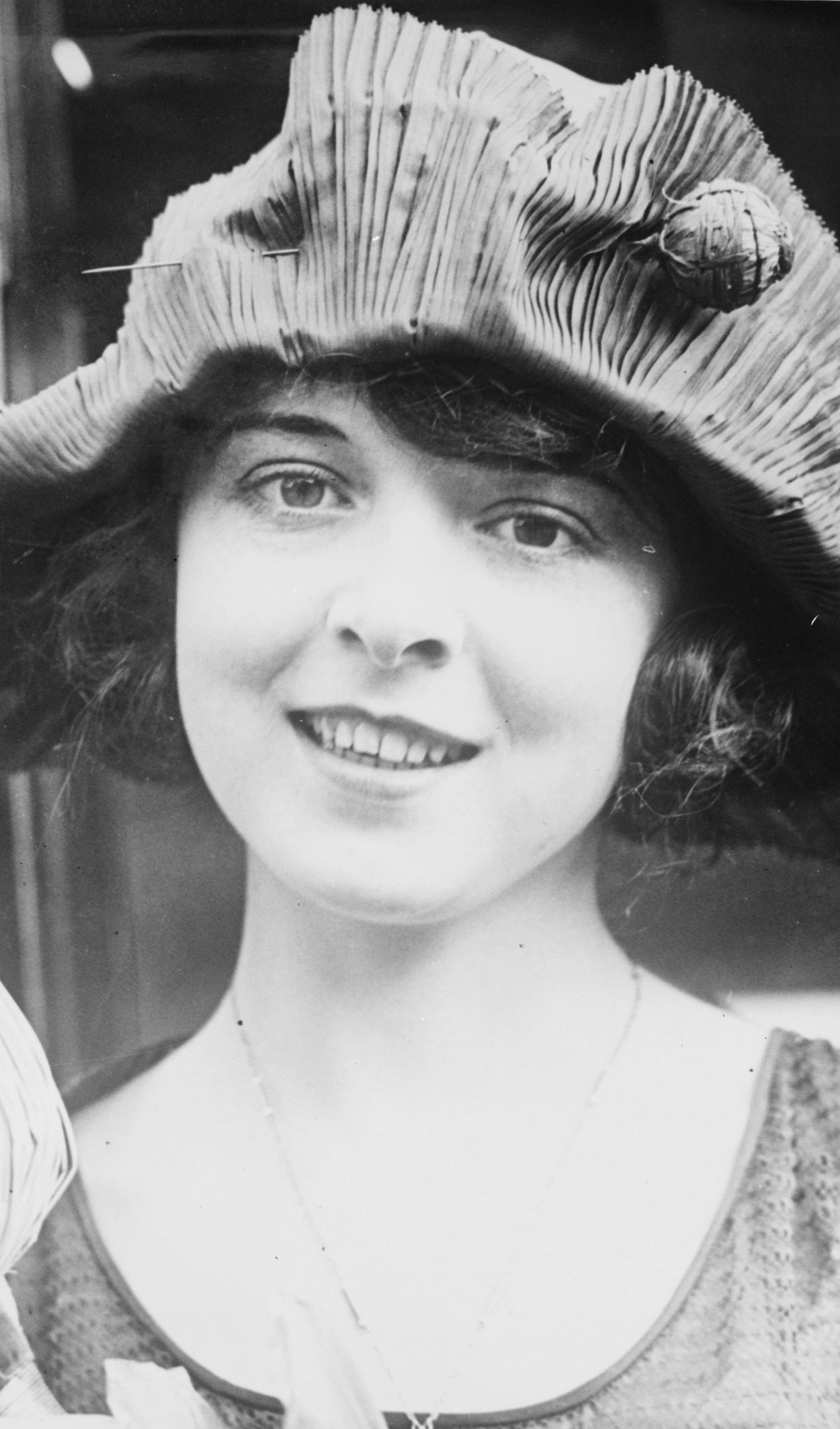
Colleen Moore wearing a hat with a hatpin, 1920

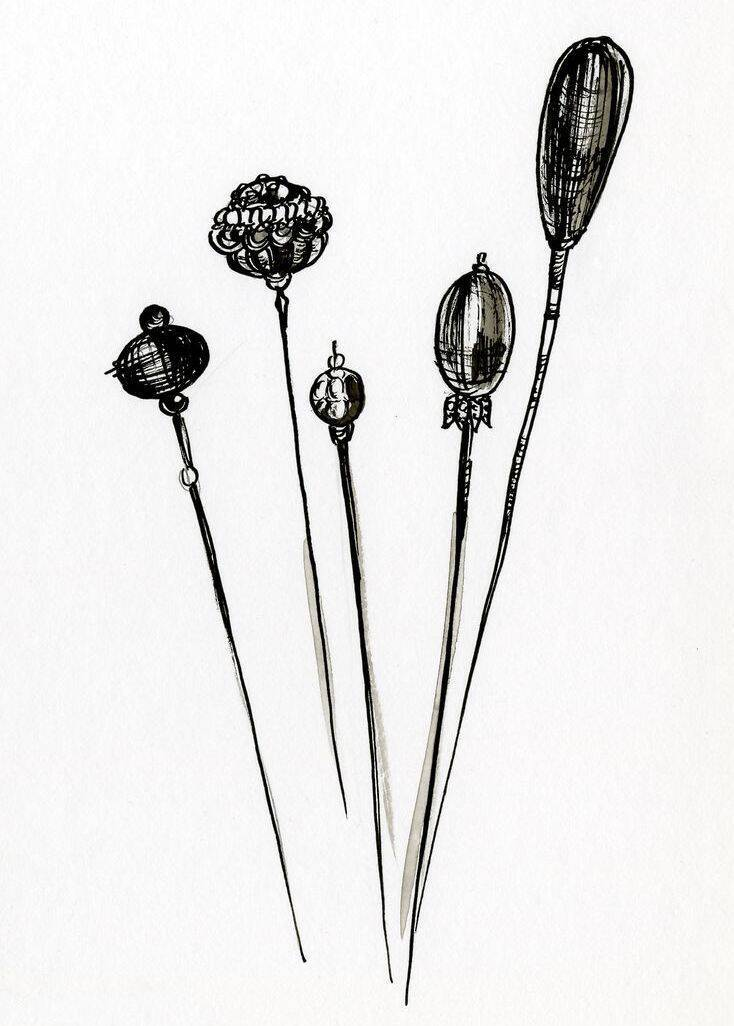
Hatpins

A hatpin is a decorative and functional pin for holding a hat to the head, usually by the hair. In Western culture, hatpins are almost solely used by women and are often worn in a pair. They are typically around 6–8 inches (15–20 cm) in length, with the pinhead being the most decorated part.

== Production ==
The hatpin was invented to hold wimples and veils in place, and was handmade. In Britain, demand eventually outgrew the number that could be supplied by hand-making, and they began to be imported from France. In 1832 a machine was invented in America which could mass-produce the pins, and they became much more affordable. During the 1880s, bonnets gave way to hats, and the popularity of hatpins soared. They remained a standard women's accessory through the 1910s and were produced in a vast range of materials and types. Hatpin holder boxes were also produced.

== Use in self-defense and as a weapon ==
Hatpins were sometimes used by women to defend themselves against assault.

Ordinances were passed from 1910 that limited the length of hatpins in Chicago (half an inch beyond the crown of the hat), Milwaukee, Pittsburgh, Baltimore, New Orleans, among other cities, as there was a concern they might be used as weapons. Also by the 1910s, ordinances were passed requiring hatpin tips to be covered so as not to injure people accidentally. Various covers were made, but poorer women often had to make do with ersatz items like potato pieces and cork.

In January 1918, the Norwegian newspaper Morgenbladet reported that police in Kristiania advised that passengers with uncovered hatpins be told to leave the trams. No law however had been passed against boarding a tram with uncovered hatpins. The tram staff had also stopped selling hatpin covers on board the trams, as regulations on the subject appeared so confusing that the staff preferred not to interfere.

== Collectibles ==
Two hatpins, c. 1904

Hatpins are collectible items, and there is an American Hatpin Society for collectors in the United States and The Hat Pin Society of Great Britain for collectors in the United Kingdom.

== Bibliography ==
- Encyclopædia Britannica, hatpin. Accessed August 16, 2005.
- The Encyclopedia of Hatpins and Hatpin Holders by Lillian Baker
