= Eric Muller =

Eric Muller may refer to:

- Eric L. Muller (born 1962), law professor at the University of North Carolina School of Law
- Erik Möller (born 1979), German freelance journalist, software developer and author
- Svend Erik Møller (1909–2002), Danish architect
- Erich Muller (born 1966), American radio personality better known by his stage name Mancow Muller
