= Lillian Baker =

American conservative author

Lillian Baker (Left) tries to grab Nisei veteran Jim Kawaminami’s (Right) testimony from his hands during the Los Angeles hearings of the Commission on Wartime Relocation and Internment of Civilians in August 1981.

Lillian Baker was a conservative author and lecturer. She is known for supporting Japanese-American Internment throughout her career.

== Biography ==
Baker was the widow of a World War II veteran. In the 1970s, Baker and others in California objected to the words "concentration camp" on a proposed state historical marker at the site of Manzanar. She opposed efforts to designate Manzanar a national historic site.

Baker downplayed the suffering of Japanese-American internees during the war. She justified Japanese-American Internment, and opposed the government to formally apologize to interned Japanese Americans, and pay reparations to Japanese-American internees. During testimony in front of the Commission on Wartime Relocation and Internment of Civilians (CWRIC), Baker assaulted Nisei veteran James Kawaminami, attempting to snatch the papers from his hands. She wrote several books on the topic of Japanese-American internment.

Lillian Baker was a founder of the Americans for Historical Accuracy. She also founded the International Club for the Collection of Hatpins and Hatpin Holders. In 1976, she was regional campaign manager for S.I. Hayakawa's U.S. Senate bid in California. Baker was awarded by the conservative Freedoms Foundation at Valley Forge.

Baker died on October 21, 1996, at the age of 75 at her home in Gardena.

== See also ==
- Michelle Malkin conservative blogger, political commentator, and author of In Defense of Internment, which defended Japanese American Internment, and the racial profiling of Arabs.

== Bibliography ==
- Lillian Baker (1987). Concentration Camp Conspiracy: A Second Pearl Harbor. Afha Publications.
- Lillian Baker (November 1991). The japanning of America: redress & reparations demands by Japanese-Americans. Webb Research Group.
- Lillian Baker (November 1988). Dishonoring America: The Collective Guilt of American Japanese. Webb Research Group.
- Lillian Baker (Oct 1, 1996). American and Japanese relocation in World War II: fact, fiction & fallacy. Webb Research Group Publishers.
