= Programmers Guild =

Organization to benefit (some) computer programmers

- Company type: Professional organization
- Successor: United Information Workers (UIW)
- Website: https://www.unitedinformationworkers.com/

Programmers Guild is an attorney-founded group intended to protect legal hi-tech immigrants to the United States and help them in obtaining Green cards. The New York Times called them a trade group and, in 2016, a "tech worker organization." It also serves as a job search clearing house.

It has been relaunched under the umbrella organization United Information Workers

The Guild has been described as "a nonprofit group with a volunteer staff." It was founded in 1998, and won in a case it filed 2006 with the US Department of Justice.

The Programmers Guild was an active participant in various legislative hearings, and companies such as Intel, Microsoft and Oracle supported them. Their use of the term guild was part of a CNN headline: "IT guild: A once and future union?" and the article evaluated the term union, noting that computer professionals are already members of large long standing organizations such as Communications Workers of America and International Federation for Professional and Technical Engineers.

== Membership ==
Dice.com, a career website, wrote in 2013 that most of the Guild's members are over age 40, and that "predominately" those involved in H-1B situations are entry level.

== Kinship ==
Other organizations that have been compared to the Guild include WashTech and Bright Future Jobs.

== Book ==
Michelle Malkin's Sold Out (book), co-authored with the Guild's founder, uses the term crapweasel in the plural on the cover. The New York Times did not do a book review on this Malkin book.
