= Sold Out (book) =

2015 book by Michelle Malkin and John Miano

Sold Out: How High-Tech Billionaires & Bipartisan Beltway Crapweasels Are Screwing America’s Best & Brightest Workers
- Author: Michelle Malkin; John Miano
- Audio read by: Juliet St. John
- Cover artist: Janet Perr
- Genre: Non Fiction
- Published: November 10, 2015
- Publisher: Simon & Schuster Audio/Mercury Ink
- Pages: 480
- ISBN: 978-15011-1594-3
- OCLC: 922639608
- Website: michellemalkin.com

Sold Out: How High-Tech Billionaires & Bipartisan Beltway Crapweasels Are Screwing America's Best & Brightest Workers is a 2015 book authored by Michelle Malkin and John Miano, a displaced high-tech professional, author and attorney who specializes in business immigration law at the policy level.

The book confronts the perception of a STEM professional shortage, exposes the flawed economics supporting the perception, and cites findings that offshore outsourcing firms are the predominant users of high-skill temporary employment-visas. The book's publication follows media reporting that Pfizer, Southern California Edison, and Walt Disney World to name a few, have each forced hundreds of employees to train their foreign replacements or risk their severance, unemployment eligibility and professional references. Additional studies cited conclude that a high percentage of qualified U.S. STEM professionals are unable to find employment in their field.

== Overview ==
Rather than an exposé on the illegal immigration topic, Sold Out highlights temporary-employment immigration, watered-down regulations, the lack of will and authority of regulators to vet applicants and investigate abuses.

Malkin is the daughter of immigrants from the Philippines, and Sold Out is a continuation of her writings on the immigration topic. Invasion (2002) was her first published book, a New York Times Best Seller reaching #14. Collectively, Malkin refers to K street lobbyists, their multinational benefactors and the politicians who cave to their demands as crapweasels in Sold Out.

Miano is a software engineer and author of numerous programming books, he is a founder of the Programmers Guild and has been a Fellow at the Center for Immigration Studies since 2008. He earned his J.D. from Seton Hall University and has testified before Congress on three occasions.

== Reception ==
In an interview and call-in segment on the Washington Journal (C-SPAN), Malkin and Miano noted bipartisan consensus on the topic among the callers, regardless of Malkin's known conservative leanings.

Sold out clearly has a point a view about the program (crapweasels, for instance), but it backs up its assertions and gives H-1B supporters a high threshold to cross. A serious argument in defense of the visa program requires explaining how America gains when a U.S. worker is replaced by foreign visa holder hired to do the exact same job. If you are going to justify the H-1B program, then you have to defend firms that force their employees (no severance otherwise) to train their replacements.

— Patrick Thibodeau, Computerworld

The book is not merely some populist jeremiad. From the beginning, Malkin and Miano present tables, footnotes and historical background to make their case against the various visas that companies use to import foreign workers. They date this trend back to the Immigration and Nationality Act of 1952, which created the H-1 and H-2 visas. They note “the H-1 visa differed from the H-2 visa in that it did not require showing that Americans were not available for the job”.

— Brad Matthews, Conservative Book Review

For example, they show that “the administrations of both George W. Bush and Barack Obama sneakily expanded the foreign worker supply by administrative fiat, including expansion of the Optional Practical Training (OPT) Program, through which 560,000 foreign ‘students’ have been authorized to work in the U.S.” Sometimes this optional training is in convenience stores.

— Malcolm A. Kline, Accuracy In Academia

After reading it, I must say that I agree with Matloff’s and Thibodeau’s assessments. The snappy, slangy, often incendiary prose suits the authors’ goal of reaching a popular audience as well as their anger at the labor conditions that have resulted from the widespread use of high-skill guest worker visas. No matter how overheated Malkin and Miano’s rhetoric may become, however, they never let emotion get in the way of solid research and analysis, and their 116 pages of supporting documents and footnotes cite sources from across the political and ideological spectrum, all the way from the conservative Breitbart News Network to the Economic Policy Institute, a nonpartisan think tank that aims to “include the needs of low- and middle-income workers in economic policy discussions,” according to its website.

— Beryl Lieff Benderly, Science Magazine

=== New York Times ===
The New York Times did not do a book review on this Malkin book, and they ignored her use of the term crapweasel in the plural on the cover. In 2009 they praised her first hardcover book.

== See also ==
- AC21 (Extends H-1B & L-1 visas beyond limitation statutes)
