= Randall Kennedy =

American legal scholar (born 1954)

Randall L. Kennedy
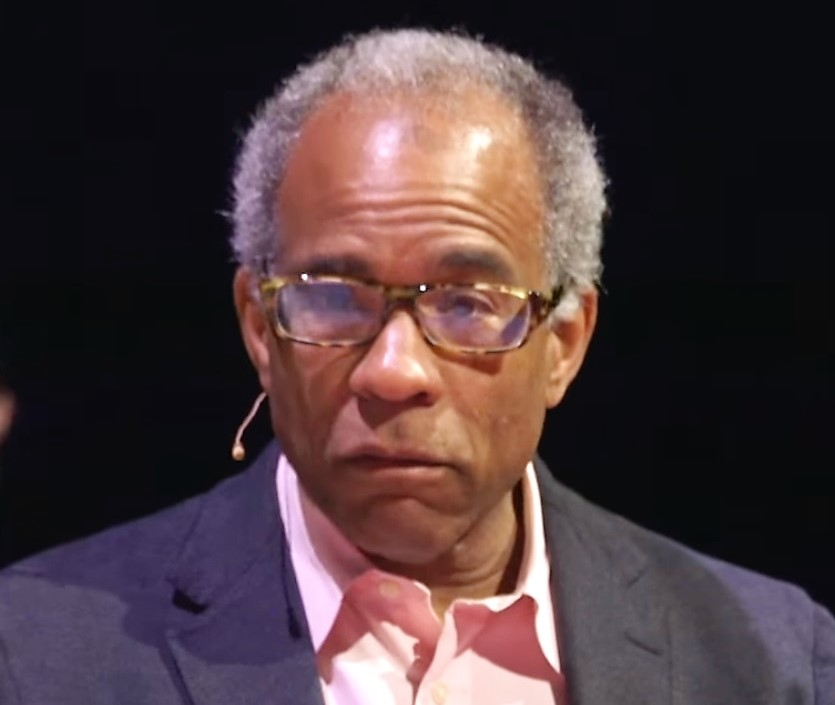
- Kennedy in 2016
- Born: Randall LeRoy Kennedy; September 10, 1954 (age 72); Columbia, South Carolina, U.S.
- Occupation: Law professor
- Spouse: Yvedt Matory (m. 1986; died 2005)
- Relatives: Henry H. Kennedy, Jr. (brother)

Academic background
- Education: Princeton University (BA); Balliol College, Oxford; Yale University (JD)

Academic work
- Institutions: Harvard University
- Website: Harvard Law Profile

Randall LeRoy Kennedy (born September 10, 1954) is an American legal scholar. He is the Michael R. Klein Professor of Law at Harvard University, and his research focuses on the intersection of racial conflict and legal institutions in American life.

He specializes in contracts, freedom of expression, race relations law, civil rights legislation, and the Supreme Court.

Kennedy has written seven books: Race, Crime, and the Law (1997); Nigger: The Strange Career of a Troublesome Word (2002); Interracial Intimacies: Sex, Marriage, Identity and Adoption (2003); Sellout: The Politics of Racial Betrayal (2008); The Persistence of the Color Line (2011); For Discrimination: Race, Affirmative Action, and the Law (2013); and Say It Loud!: On Race, Law, History, and Culture (2021).

He has also published several collections of shorter works.

== Early life and education ==
Randall LeRoy Kennedy was born on September 10, 1954, in Columbia, South Carolina, the middle child of Henry Kennedy Sr., a postal worker, and Rachel Kennedy, an elementary school teacher. He has two siblings, Henry H. Kennedy, Jr., a former United States District Court Judge for the District of Columbia, and Angela Kennedy, a lawyer at the Public Defender Service for the District of Columbia. Kennedy has said that tales of racial oppression and racial resistance were staples of conversation in his household. His father often spoke of watching Thurgood Marshall argue Rice vs. Elmore, the case that invalidated the rule permitting only whites to vote in South Carolina's Democratic primary. Later that decade, fleeing the abuses of Jim Crow, Kennedy's parents moved to Washington, D.C.

Kennedy attended St. Albans School in Washington, D.C., and graduated cum laude with a B.A. degree in history from Princeton University in 1977, after completing an 135-page senior thesis, "Richard Hofstadter: The Historian as Social Critic". Kennedy then studied as a Rhodes Scholar at Balliol College, Oxford, from 1977 to 1979, and at Yale Law School, where he received a J.D. in 1982. Kennedy served as an editor for the Yale Law Journal. He served as a law clerk for Judge J. Skelly Wright of the United States Court of Appeals for the D.C. Circuit in 1982–83 and for Justice Thurgood Marshall of the United States Supreme Court in 1983–84. Kennedy was admitted to the Washington, D.C. bar in 1983. He is a member of the bar of the Supreme Court of the United States, a fellow of the American Academy of Arts and Sciences, and a member of both the American Philosophical Association and the American Philosophical Society.

== Career ==
=== Academia ===
In 1984, Kennedy joined the faculty at Harvard Law School, teaching courses on race, law, and freedom of expression. He first came to prominence as a legal-academic scholar when he began addressing affirmative action. In 1997, he published Race, Crime, and the Law, which received the Robert F. Kennedy Book Award in 1998. "This book is a brave, honest, forceful intervention in that debate", wrote William A. Galston and David Wasserman in the Wilson Quarterly, adding: "With restrained passion, he documents the myriad ways in which our legal system has betrayed the principle of fair and equal treatment for African Americans." Kennedy argues in the book that African Americans have suffered at the hands of the criminal justice system, but also claims that blacks have committed a "notably large proportion" of the crimes that people are most afraid of (robbery, rape, murder, aggravated assault). He likewise argues that the need to protect black communities from crime has often been neglected. Galston and Wasserman wrote: "Too often, says Kennedy, black leaders show more concern for black perpetrators of crime than for their black victims."

=== Views ===
External videos
- Presentation by Kennedy on Race, Crime, and the Law, May 16, 1997, C-SPAN
- Booknotes interview with Kennedy on Nigger, March 3, 2002, C-SPAN
- Presentation by Kennedy on Nigger, October 11, 2002, C-SPAN
- Presentation by Kennedy on Interracial Intimacies, February 17, 2003, C-SPAN

Kennedy is known as being unafraid to tackle socially difficult issues, such as racism. He has written for academic and popular journals, published several books, and served on the editorial boards of the magazines American Prospect and The Nation. Kennedy has written extensively on interracial marriages and adoptions, and on the relationship between race and crime. His views have garnered acclaim and controversy. "One of the things they [critics] find disconcerting is that I ask questions," Kennedy told Lawrence Donegan in the London Observer. "I actually question the premise of my own thinking and push my own conclusions hard. I thought that was what intellectuals were supposed to do." Despite the firestorm created by Kennedy's published work, Donegan said that Kennedy's "colleagues variously describe him as brilliant, well-read and personable".

Kennedy is a staunch defender of freedom of speech, stating "a speech-protective culture—a culture that defends even ugly expression—benefits minority communities, that depend upon protest to make their presence and their preferences seen and heard." In 2002, controversy erupted when Kennedy published the book Nigger: The Strange Career of a Troublesome Word, which was based on a series of lectures he had given at Stanford University two years earlier. "The power of 'Nigger'", Charles Taylor wrote in Salon, "is that Kennedy writes fully of the word, neither condemning its every use nor fantasizing that it can ever become solely a means of empowerment." In the book, Kennedy explores the word's history, and how its meaning varies according to the context of its use. "I'm not saying that any particular instance of using the N-word is any more horrifying and menacing than any other such word", he told Daniel Smith in The Atlantic magazine. "I am saying that from a broad sociological view, the word is associated with more havoc in American society than other racial slurs."

In Interracial Intimacies: Sex, Marriage, Identity and Adoption (2003), Kennedy attempts to bring greater understanding to the racial issues that continue to trouble American society. "His premise is based on common sense", wrote Emily Bernard in Black Issues Book Review. "Until Americans confront racial bias in the most intimate arenas of their lives, we will continue to live with racism and its consequences." Unlike many black intellectuals, Kennedy supports interracial adoption. "Parenting is a mysterious thing", he told Lise Funderburg in Essence magazine. "People will learn what they need to learn in order to help their child along. I'm willing to assume that with respect to all parents, including White people who want to adopt Black kids." Kennedy explores interracial marriages throughout American history as well as their presence in literature and film. "There is something hopeful in Kennedy's historical accounts," Bernard writes. "In spite of the law ... some individuals managed to maintain honorable and nuanced relationships with people they were legally forbidden to approach as equals."

Kennedy's views have been controversial even among other black intellectuals. Writing in The New Statesman in 2002, Darcus Howe noted of Kennedy's book Nigger : "Had a white person used the word, rejection would have been immediate. Now white society can always point to Kennedy and say that a negro advanced the view that 'nigger' is acceptable." Many black scholars have called Kennedy's work conservative, and worry that books such as Race, Crime, and the Law provide political cover for white conservatives. "Over the years", wrote Derrick Bell, "Professor Kennedy has become the impartial, black intellectual, commenting on our still benighted condition and as ready to criticize as commend." When asked by Kate Tuttle of Africana how he felt about the controversy over Nigger, Kennedy replied: "What's the worst that happens? That someone writes a very long diatribe in The New Yorker excoriating me...I'm not facing firing squads, I'm not facing exile, I'm not facing jail."

Kennedy is a strong critic of the US Supreme Court's decision in Shelby County v. Holder, writing that it was "the most unjustifiable and hurtful decision imposed upon black America during the past half century...that cripple[d] legislation for which proponents of racial justice marched, bled, and in some instances died." Kennedy has criticized the prison abolition and defund the police movements, stating that "It is true that far too many people are imprisoned in the US, that the process by which people are incarcerated is shot through with unfairness, than an appreciable number of prisoners are wrongly convicted, and that cruel, inhumane, and dangerous conditions are far too prevalent in American prisons. America is disgraced by the barbarity, the hyper-punitiveness, and the obvious inequities in its system of criminal justice. But it is not improper for a society to protect itself from individuals who rape, murder, assault, or rob others in violation of laws that set boundaries that, if crossed, make one vulnerable to imprisonment." Kennedy opposes the death penalty.

In March 2021, Kennedy participated in a debate hosted by Intelligence Squared US on the issue of slavery reparations, taking the position that he is "not an enemy of reparations, but has deep concerns about it". He said his principal objections were the waste of important time and energy on a "futile movement", administrative difficulties associated with reparations, that they poorly target those who are presently in need, and that reparations will likely have unintended consequences.

=== Current activities ===
Through numerous appearances on the lecture circuit, Kennedy continues to promote debate on hot-button racial issues in the public arena. "If you are socially isolated", he told Regan Goode in The New York Times, "you are more vulnerable to stereotypes and myths, you won't have the opportunity to have conversations with someone who has a different social background than you." While many critics have attempted to use Kennedy's work to advance their own agendas, he has retained his academic independence. "Against black pessimists", wrote Galston and Wasserman, "[Kennedy] argues that substantial progress has been made toward the ideal of color-blind justice. Against complacent whites, he argues that there is still a long way to go." According to Kennedy, the relationship between white and black America remains one of America's most perplexing problems. "Obviously there are all sorts of ethnic, racial conflicts in American society", Kennedy told Smith, "but there's one that is deeper than all the others and that's white/black racial conflict."

Kennedy served as a trustee of Princeton University from 1994 to 1998 and from 2005 to 2015. He also serves on the Board of Directors at The National Coalition Against Censorship.

In May 2023, Kennedy gave a long-form interview on the Lex Fridman podcast entitled "The N-Word – History of Race, Law, Politics, and Power".

== Personal life ==
In 1986, Kennedy married Yvedt Matory, a cancer surgeon. They have three children. Matory died of complications from melanoma, on April 15, 2005.

== Works ==
External videos
- Presentation by Kennedy on Sellout, January 28, 2008, C-SPAN
- After Words interview with Kennedy on The Persistence of the Color Line, September 3, 2011, C-SPAN
- Interview with Kennedy on The Persistence of the Color Line, November 20, 2011, C-SPAN
- Presentation by Kennedy on For Discrimination, September 15, 2013, C-SPAN
- Interview with Kennedy on For Discrimination, November 23, 2014, C-SPAN
- Interview with Kennedy on Say It Loud!, September 21, 2021, C-SPAN

- 1989. "Racial Critiques of Legal Academia", 102 Harvard Law Review 1745–1819.
- 1997. Race, Crime, and the Law. ISBN 9780307814654
- 2002. Nigger: The Strange Career of a Troublesome Word. ISBN 9780375421723
- 2003. Interracial Intimacies: Sex, Marriage, Identity and Adoption. ISBN 9780375702648
- 2008. Sellout: The Politics of Racial Betrayal. ISBN 9780375425431
- 2011. The Persistence of the Color Line: Racial Politics and the Obama Presidency. ISBN 9780307455550
- 2013. For Discrimination: Race, Affirmative Action, and the Law. ISBN 9780307949363
- 2021. Say It Loud! On Race, Law, History, and Culture. ISBN 9780593316047
- Randall Kennedy, "Racist Litter" (review of Eric Foner, The Second Founding: How the Civil War and Reconstruction Remade the Constitution, Norton, October 2019, ISBN 978-0-393-65257-4, 288 pp.), London Review of Books, vol. 42, no. 15 (July 30, 2020), pp. 21–23. Kennedy quotes Foner (p. 23): "A century and a half after the end of slavery, the project of equal citizenship remains unfinished."

== Awards ==
- National Achievement scholarship, 1973–77
- Rhodes scholarship, 1977–79
- Earl Warren Legal Training scholarship, 1979–82
- Honorary Doctorate, University of Chicago, 2024

== See also ==
- List of law clerks for the tenth seat of the Supreme Court of the United States
