= Twitchy =

American Twitter aggregator

- The logo of Twitchy
- Website type: News aggregator
- Available in: English
- Owner: Salem Media Group
- Founder: Michelle Malkin
- Editor: Lori Ziganto
- Website: twitchy.com
- Commercial: Yes
- Registration: Optional, required to comment
- Launched: 2012; 14 years ago
- Current status: Online

Twitchy is an American Twitter aggregator and commentary website. Founded by conservative pundit Michelle Malkin in 2012, the site was sold to Salem Media Group in 2013 and is now operated by Townhall Media. The site has sections for American politics, entertainment, political cartoons, and media.

According to Quantcast, Twitchy received nearly 2 million unique visitors a month as of 2015. Twitchy's Twitter account has over 246,000 followers.

== History ==
Twitchy was founded by Michelle Malkin in 2012. In December 2013, the website was sold to Salem Media Group, a conservative Christian broadcasting corporation that had purchased Malkin's political blog Hot Air in 2010. Malkin has been unconnected with Twitchy since 2015.

== Content ==
Twitchy is a conservative website "revolving around provocative commentary on Twitter." The website aggregates tweets, creating stories and organizing them into short posts. The site has seven full-time employees and two-part-time writers who live in different areas of the United States. According to editor Lori Ziganto, the site "can produce 40 to 45 stories on a busy day."

== Reception and influence ==
The website has been noted for bringing periods of Twitter attention to journalists who have been featured on the website, with some reporters regarding being "Twitchied" as a rite of passage. Writing for Cosmopolitan, Jill Filipovic characterized Twitchy as a harassment tool that targets liberal journalists, often disproportionately featuring people of color and women. According to a 2014 article in Slate, Twitchy had "carved out its own odd niche in the D.C. media world" and was "the rare site that has both broad-based and cult appeal."
