= Culture of Corruption =

2009 book by Michelle Malkin

Culture of Corruption: Obama and His Team of Tax Cheats, Crooks, and Cronies
- Author: Michelle Malkin
- Language: English
- Subject: Politics
- Publisher: Regnery Publishing
- Publication date: July 2009
- Publication place: United States
- Media type: Print (Hardcover)
- Pages: 376
- ISBN: 1596981091
- OCLC: 316834469
- Dewey Decimal: 973.932 22
- LC Class: JK2249 .M35 2009
- Preceded by: Unhinged: Exposing Liberals Gone Wild
- Text: Culture of Corruption: Obama and His Team of Tax Cheats, Crooks, and Cronies at Internet Archive

Culture of Corruption: Obama and His Team of Tax Cheats, Crooks, and Cronies is a book written by conservative author Michelle Malkin. The book claims that the Barack Obama administration has had dozens of instances of corruption. The title is a reference to "culture of corruption", a political slogan used by Democrats to refer to events that happened during the presidency of George W. Bush.

The book spent six weeks at #1 on the hardcover non-fiction section of the New York Times Best Seller list.

In August 2010, an updated paperback edition with three new chapters was published.

== Reception ==
Steve Almond of Salon Magazine gave the book an unfavorable review, describing it as a "transparently mercenary clip job patched together via large doses of Red Bull and Google."

Michael Gaynor of Renew America wrote, "The Far Left finds Ms. Malkin far too formidable and thus reflexively resorts to baseless personal attacks against her because they can't refute her on the facts and don't want people paying attention to her."

Preceded by Unmasked: The Final Years of Michael Jackson by Ian Halperin	#1 New York Times Best Seller Non-Fiction; August 16, 2009 – September 20, 2009	Succeeded by Official Book Club Selection by Kathy Griffin
