= In Defense of Internment =

2004 book by Michelle Malkin

- Book cover
- Author: Michelle Malkin
- Language: English
- Subject: Racial profiling Law enforcement Internment of Japanese Americans; War on terror
- Publisher: Regnery Publishing
- Publication date: 2004
- Publication place: United States
- Pages: 376
- ISBN: 0-89526-051-4
- OCLC: 55672102
- Dewey Decimal: 940.53/1773 22
- LC Class: HV8141 .M245 2004
- Text: In Defense of Internment at Internet Archive

In Defense of Internment: The Case for 'Racial Profiling' in World War II and the War on Terror (ISBN 0-89526-051-4) is a 2004 book written by conservative American political commentator Michelle Malkin. Malkin defends the internment of Japanese Americans in the United States during World War II and racial profiling of Arabs during the post-2001 war on terror. The book's message has been condemned by Japanese American groups and civil rights advocates. Its point of view has received both support, and criticism by academics.

== Response to In Defense of Internment ==
There was considerable media interest in the book especially on the American West Coast and Hawaii, where the impact of relocation and internment in World War II was greatest. It made the New York Times Best Seller list in September 2004. As anticipated by Malkin, the book proved to be highly controversial.

=== Support ===
Charles A. Lofgren, Professor Emeritus of American History and Politics at Stanford University, reviewing the book in the Claremont Review of Books, said that Malkin provided "a largely fair assessment of the relocation program in operation" and that it is not an assessment that will please those who equate it with the Nazis' death camps. Lofgren wrote:

What then is the moral for Malkin? This: don't be misled by the pandering of "civil rights absolutists" intent on using "legends" about the World War II experience as "multicultural group therapy…to color and poison the current national security debate." Are there specific lessons from the removal? Vigorously gather intelligence. Prevent people in suspect categories from holding sensitive civilian and military jobs. Avoid hard-to-win jury trials of subversives. Guard the secrets. As she recognizes, but without much recognition of the irony, the leading governmental opponents of mass relocation in 1942 said pretty much the same things.

Political scientist Robert P. Hager, reviewing the book in the Terrorism and Political Violence journal, states that the book is well written and shows extensive research. Defending Malkin, he writes that "those who raise uncomfortable issues in good faith do not deserve to be silenced with blanket allegations of bigotry". Hager praises the book's content assessing that Malkin makes a good case that racial animus was not the reason for the relocation. Hager notes:

Malkin also provides something left out of the discussion of the whole ‘‘internment’’ issue: a discussion of the military context of 1941–42. Japanese submarines would shell and launch seaplane attacks against the western United States and Canada until well into 1942. In short, there is a lot in Malkin’s book that is generally left out of the way that ‘‘internment’’ is presented to the American public: the fact that military and civilian intelligence services had real evidence of the participation of ethnic Japanese in enemy espionage, the events on Niihau Island, and the very real vulnerability of the United States until well into 1942.

Historian Daniel Pipes writes that Malkin "broke the academic single-note scholarship on a critical subject, cutting through a shabby, stultifying consensus" to reveal how, given what was known and not known at the time, President Roosevelt and his staff did the right thing. He stated:

She correctly concludes that, especially in time of war, governments should take into account nationality, ethnicity, and religious affiliation in their homeland security policies and engage in what she calls "threat profiling." These steps may entail bothersome or offensive measures but, she argues, they are preferable to "being incinerated at your office desk by a flaming hijacked plane."

=== Criticism ===
John Tateishi, the Executive Director of the Japanese American Citizens League issued a letter of protest to Malkin on August 24, 2004, calling the book "a desperate attempt to impugn the loyalty of Japanese Americans during World War II to justify harsher governmental policies today in the treatment of Arab and Muslim Americans."

Fred Korematsu, the plaintiff in the Supreme Court case Korematsu v. United States which upheld the constitutionality of internment, wrote:

According to Malkin, it is OK to take away an entire ethnic group's civil rights because some individuals are suspect. [...] It is painful to see reopened for serious debate the question of whether the government was justified in imprisoning Japanese Americans during World War II. It was my hope that my case and the cases of other Japanese American internees would be remembered for the dangers of racial and ethnic scapegoating.

Reviewing the book for the American libertarian magazine Reason, Eric L. Muller of the University of North Carolina Law School wrote:

[T]he evidence Malkin deploys [...] is — at best — mere speculation. This speculation might be worth a moment's reflection if Malkin also addressed the voluminous historical research that has shown the impact of racism, nativism, political pressure, economic jealousies, and war panic on the government's policies toward Japanese Americans. [...] But Malkin does not so much as mention any of that evidence, except to say that a reader can find it elsewhere in 'pedantic tomes' and 'educational propaganda.' She dismisses what she cannot rebut.

Thirty-nine scholars and professional researchers, predominantly Japanese, from the "Historians' Committee for Fairness" signed a letter condemning Malkin's book for alleged "blatant violation of professional standards of objectivity and fairness". Five scholars and professional researchers defended Malkin against the letter.

== See also ==
- Propaganda for Japanese-American internment
