= Lise Funderburg =

American writer and editor

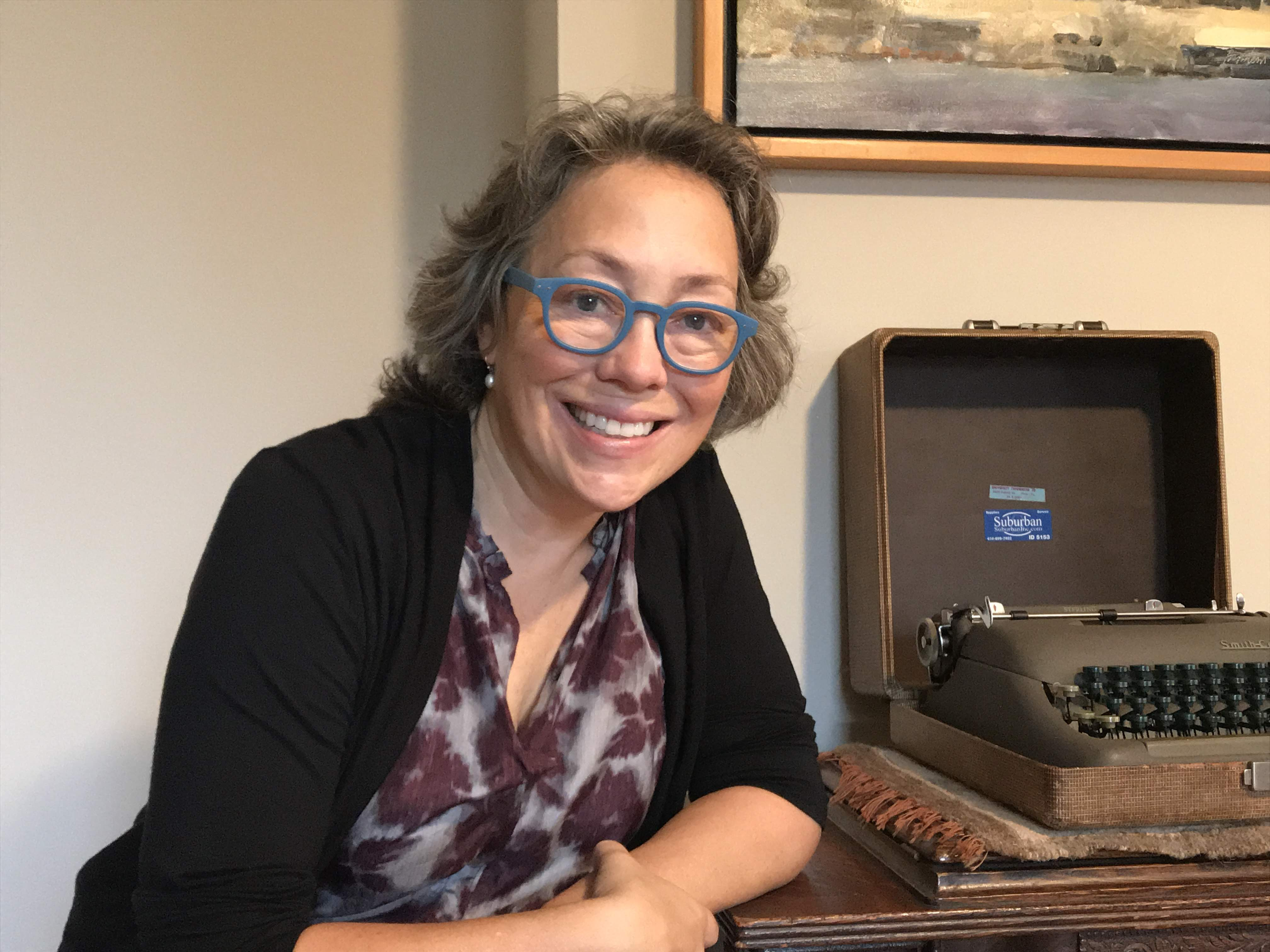
- Funderburg in 2009
- Born: Lise Kristin Funderburg; July 27, 1959 (age 67); Philadelphia, Pennsylvania
- Education: Tufts University; Reed College
- Occupations: Writer, editor

Lise Kristin Funderburg (born July 27, 1959) is an American writer and editor. She is the author of Pig Candy: Taking My Father South, Taking My Father Home, and Black, White, Other: Biracial Americans Talk about Race and Identity. One of the first books to explore the lives of adult children of black-white unions, Black, White, Other is a core text in the study of American multiracial identity.

== Early life and education ==
Lise Funderburg was born in Philadelphia, Pennsylvania, in 1959. She is the youngest of three daughters born to George Newton Funderburg and Marjorie Jeane Funderburg [née Lievense]. Funderburg was raised in the West Philadelphia neighborhood of Powelton Village, a relatively stable racially mixed community that countered prevailing trends of white flight and exclusionary real estate practices. As a child, Funderburg regularly attended services and Sunday School at the First Unitarian Church of Philadelphia, the same church where her parents had married, which was significant at the time, as more than 17 states still forbade interracial marriage.

Funderburg attended the local kindergarten at Samuel Powel public school, then attended grades 1 through 12 at Friends’ Central School, a private Quaker school located on the boundary line between the city and the Main Line suburbs. After graduating from Friends’ Central, she studied for two years at Tufts University in Medford, Massachusetts, then transferred to Reed College in Portland, Oregon. While at Reed, she spent a term in London before graduating in the class of 1982. Funderburg soon moved to the Boston area, where she spent a year waitressing at Legal Sea Foods before she got her first job in publishing. In 1988, Funderburg moved to New York city, took a job as managing editor at Avenue magazine for almost two years, then went to the Columbia University Graduate School of Journalism, from which she graduated in 1991. Her master’s thesis sparked the idea for her first book, Black, White, Other: Biracial Americans Talk About Race and Identity (Morrow, 1994), and she built a career in New York as a freelance writer and editor.

== Career ==
In 1996, she moved back to her hometown of Philadelphia, settling in Mt. Airy, another of the city’s longstanding integrated neighborhoods. In addition to writing and editing, Funderburg began teaching, mostly at the university level but also in public and private settings as well as one-on-one manuscript consultations through the Creative Nonfiction Foundation. Funderburg has taught at Ohio State University, Rutgers University-Camden, the Paris American Academy, and, since 2003, at the University of Pennsylvania. Her specialty is creative nonfiction workshops, with an emphasis on revision. In addition to manuscript consultations, Funderburg has been a project editor and long-term substitute editor with such publications as Vogue, Time Out New York, Garden Design, O, the Oprah Magazine, O at Home, Lucky, Mirabella, US Air, Self, and Mademoiselle.

In 2004, Funderburg married John Reynolds Howard, father to Lise’s stepson. John Howard is an architect who appears from time to time in Funderburg’s essays and books, especially her 2008 social history/memoir, Pig Candy: Taking My Father South, Taking My Father Home (Free Press). Funderburg continues to write, teach and edit from her base in Philadelphia. She is also a public speaker, and has spoken at such venues as Colby College, Bard College, Bryn Mawr College, UC Santa Cruz, Community College of Philadelphia; New York University, The Southern Festival of Books, Rutgers University, Rhode Island College, Swarthmore College, and NonfictioNow.

In 2019, The University of Nebraska Press published Apple, Tree: Writers on their Parents, a collection of original essays by writers such as Ann Patchett, Daniel Mendelsohn, Laura Van Den Berg, Mat Johnson, kyoko Mori, Sallie Tisdale, Bear Bergman, and Shukree Tilghman. Funderburg conceived of, commissioned, and edited this anthology as a way to showcase and reflect on that pivotal moment in life when people realize they have turned into their parents.

== Published work ==
Lise Funderburg's journalism has appeared in publications including The New York Times, TIME, Newsday, The Nation, O, the Oprah magazine, The New York Observer, American Demographics, The Chicago Tribune, City Limits, Metropolis, Elle, Time Out New York, Mirabella, African American Review, Essence, Glamour, Hungry Mind Review, National Geographic, More, Country Living, Garden Design, The Nation, and The Philadelphia Inquirer. Her essays have been published in Threepenny Review, Harper's, New England Review, Cleaver, Brevity, GourmetLive, Chattahoochee Review, and elsewhere. Her book reviews have appeared in The New York Times Book Review, Newsday, Quarterly Black Review, Mirabella, The Washington Post, The San Francisco Chronicle, Salon, Hungry Mind Review, and The Philadelphia Inquirer.

=== Selected articles and essays ===
Hot Dog, Cimarron Review, Spring/Summer 2022

"Table Talk", The Threepenny Review, Fall 2021

“The Changing Face of America”, National Geographic, October 2013

“Big Love: My Adventure with Elephants in Thailand”, More, September 2011

Extreme Home Charcuterie, GourmetLive, March 16, 2011

“Are We Having Fun Yet? Dating After Divorce”, O, the Oprah Magazine, February 2003

“The Bearable Enlightenment of Weights”, O the Oprah Magazine, November 2001

“Saving Jason”, LIFE, May 2000

“Race in Class, After Integration”, The Nation, June 5, 2000

“Why We Break Up With Our Siblings”, TIME, December 18, 2000

“The Last Goodbye: When both parents die, middle-aged children must adjust to a new stage of life in which they become adult orphans”, TIME, November 13, 2000

“Integration Anxiety: Montclair, N.J., has embraced racial diversity like no other town in America. But race, it turns out, is never a black-and-white issue”, The New York Times Magazine, November 7, 1999

“Loving Thy Neighborhood”, The Nation, December 14, 1998

“When Are You White?”, Hungry Mind Review, Spring 1998

== Awards and honors ==
2013 Civitella Ranieri Foundation Fellowship, Umbria, Italy

2012 First Prize for Narrative Nonfiction Feature Story ("Big Love," More magazine), American Society of Journalists & Authors

2012 Drexel University selects Pig Candy for its Freshman Reading Program

2011 Mixed Roots Film & Literary Festival selects Black, White, Other as best representation of the mixed-race experience in films and literature

2004, 2006 City Gardens Contest 2nd Prize for Individual Flower Garden, Philadelphia, PA

2004 Puffin Foundation Grant

2003, 2004 MacDowell Colony residency, Peterborough, NH

2003 Pennsylvania Council on the Arts Creative Nonfiction Fellowship

2002 Leeway Foundation Window of Opportunity Grant, Philadelphia, PA

1999, 1997 The Thurber House writer in residence, Columbus, OH

1997 The Dick Goldensohn Fund Projects grant, NY, NY

1996 Blue Mountain Center writer’s residency, Blue Mountain Lake, NY

== Bibliography ==
=== Books ===
Black, White, Other: Biracial Americans Talk About Race and Identity (William Morrow & Company, Inc., 1994; Quill, 1995; Smashwords, 2014).

The Color Purple: A Memory Book, with a foreword by Oprah Winfrey (Carroll & Graf, 2006)

Pig Candy: Taking My Father South, Taking My Father Home (Free Press, 2008)

Apple, Tree: Writers on Their Parents (University of Nebraska Press, 2019)

Purple Rising: Celebrating 40 Years of the Magic, Power, and Artistry of The Color Purple (Simon & Schuster, 2023)

=== Anthology contributions ===
O’s Little Book of Happiness By the Editors of O, The Oprah Magazine (Flatiron Books, 2015)

Best African American Essays 2010 Edited by Randall Kennedy (Guest Editor), Gerald Early (Series Editor) (Ballantine Books, 2010)

Live Your Best Life: A Treasury of Wisdom, Wit, Advice, Interviews, and Inspiration from O, The Oprah Magazine (Oxmoor House, 2005)

Powerweb: The Family Edited by Kathleen R. Gilbert (McGraw-Hill/Dushkin, 2005)

101 Damnations: The Humorists’ Tour of Personal Hells Edited by Michael J. Rosen (St. Martin’s Press, 2003)

These Hands I Know: African American Writers on Family Edited by Afaa Michael Weaver (Sarabande Books, 2002)

21st Century Dog: A Visionary Compendium Edited by Michael J. Rosen (Stewart Tabori & Chang, 2000)

The American Civil Rights Movement: Readings & Interpretations Edited by Raymond D’Angelo (McGraw-Hill/Dushkin, 2000)

Identity Matters: Rhetorics of Difference Edited by Lillian Bridwell-Bowles (Prentice-Hall, 1997)
