= Construction of Mount Rushmore =

Coordinates: 43°52′58.41″N 103°27′20.13″W

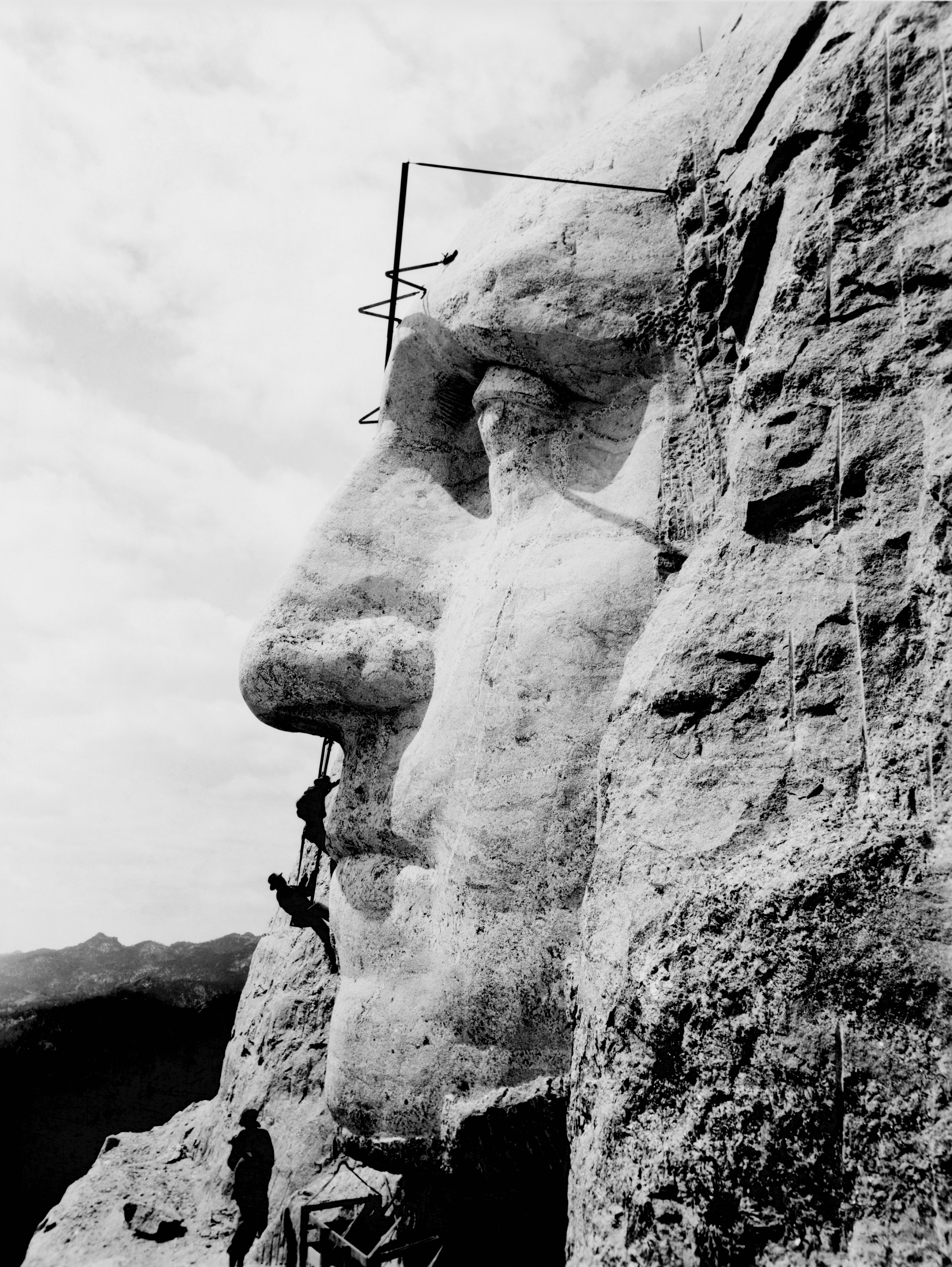
Construction on the George Washington portrait at Mount Rushmore, c. 1932

The construction of Mount Rushmore National Memorial began on October 4, 1927, and took 14 years to complete. The sculptor of the memorial was Gutzon Borglum, the son of Danish immigrants. He chose the two most famous presidents, George Washington and Abraham Lincoln, and chose Thomas Jefferson because of the 1803 Louisiana Purchase (which included the land that became South Dakota). Theodore Roosevelt was suggested by United States president Calvin Coolidge. Borglum's original design was intended to go down to their waists, but aside from the Washington sculpture time constraints and funding only provided for their heads.

Borglum also envisaged other grand extensions to his plan, but a combination of hard granite, looming war in Europe, and lack of funding conspired against him. His team had reached 70 feet into the granite by March 1941, when Borglum unexpectedly died. The monument was deemed complete and all work shut down on October 31 of the same year.

In 1998, a titanium vault was installed in the granite floor of the unfinished hall, and filled with 16 porcelain enamel panels that include the United States Constitution and other important historical documents. A walking trail and boardwalk travels through the forests to the sculptor's studio, now a museum with information about the construction of the monument.

== Designing the monument ==
Doane Robinson of the South Dakota Historical Society wanted a monument to be built in South Dakota in order to help the economy of the state by attracting tourism. In 1923, he proposed that this monument should be built from the granite cliffs in the Black Hills of South Dakota. Senator Peter Norbeck of South Dakota approved the proposal, and federal funding helped the project. Robinson asked architect and sculptor Gutzon Borglum to sculpt and design the monument. Borglum decided to use Mount Rushmore for the sculpture, since it seemed to be the easiest and most stable of the cliffs to work on.

Having decided on the location of the sculpture, Borglum decided to make the monument of four presidents of the United States. He chose the two most famous presidents in American history, George Washington and Abraham Lincoln. He chose Thomas Jefferson because Jefferson nearly doubled the size of the United States in the 1803 Louisiana Purchase (which included the land that became South Dakota). The last president Borglum chose was Theodore Roosevelt, suggested by President Calvin Coolidge (who insisted that at least there be two Republicans and at least one Democrat represented) because of Theodore Roosevelt's introduction of the National Park Service.

Borglum's original design was a sculpture of each president intended to go down to their waists, but time constraints and funding only provided for their heads. Ivan Houser, father of John Sherrill Houser, was assistant sculptor to Gutzon Borglum during the early years of carving; he began working with Borglum shortly after the inception of the monument and was with Borglum for a total of seven years. When Houser left Gutzon to devote his talents to his own work, Borglum's son, Lincoln Borglum, became assistant sculptor.

== Construction ==
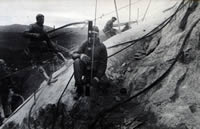
Workers used harnesses attached to steel cables while sculpting.

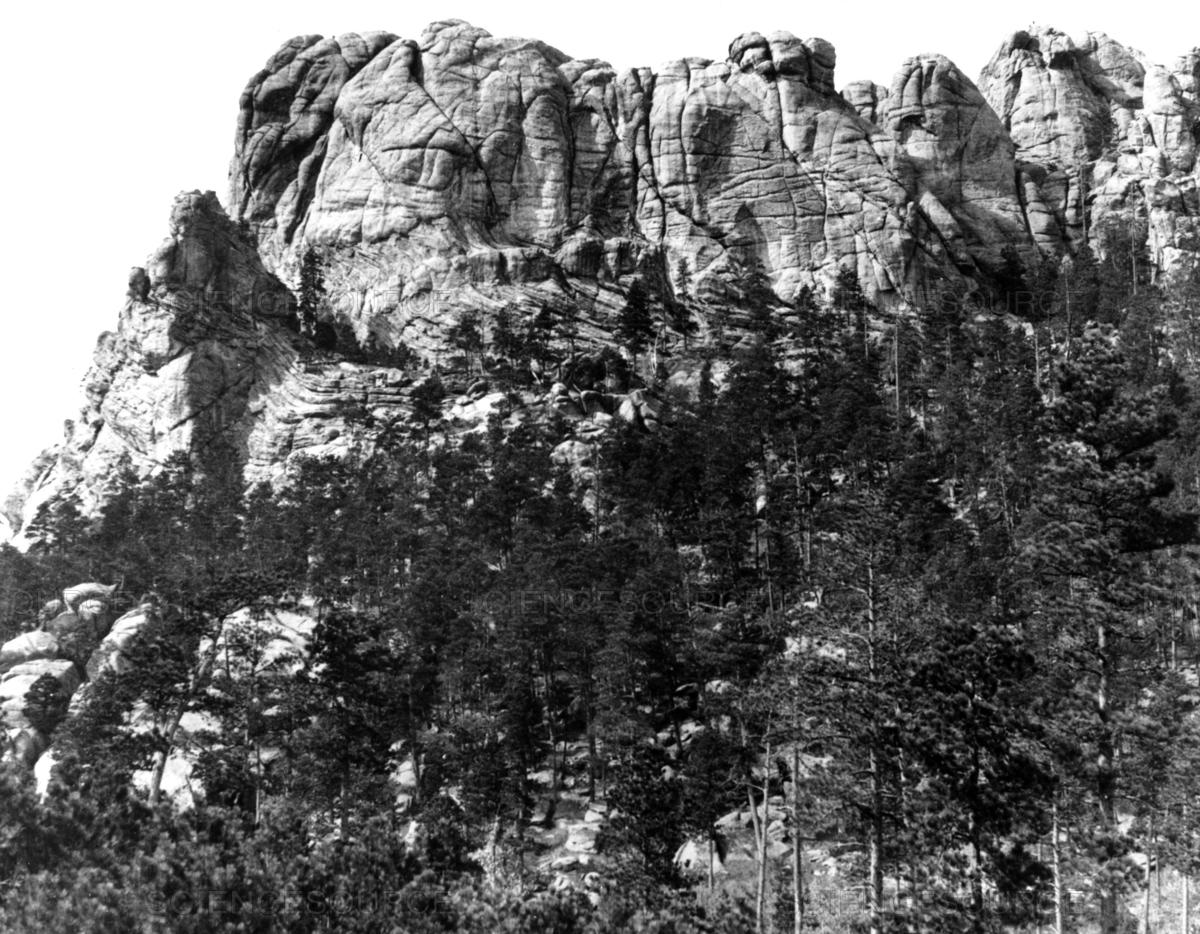
Mount Rushmore before construction around 1905

A few hundred workers, most of whom were miners, sculptors, or rock climbers, used dynamite, jackhammers, and chisels to remove material from the mountain. A stairway was constructed to the top of the mountain, where ropes were fixed. Workers were supported by harnesses attached to the ropes.

The irises of the eyes were sculpted as holes. A cube of granite was left in each to represent the reflection highlight thereby making the appearance of the eyes more realistic.

Construction began on October 4, 1927. In 1935, Borglum appointed Italian immigrant Luigi Del Bianco as chief carver.

== George Washington ==
George Washington's head was started first. Due to the economic instability of the United States caused by the Great Depression, it was completed in seven years, and dedicated to the public on Independence Day 1934. A large American flag was placed over Washington's head before it was revealed, and this became a tradition for each of the presidents' heads.

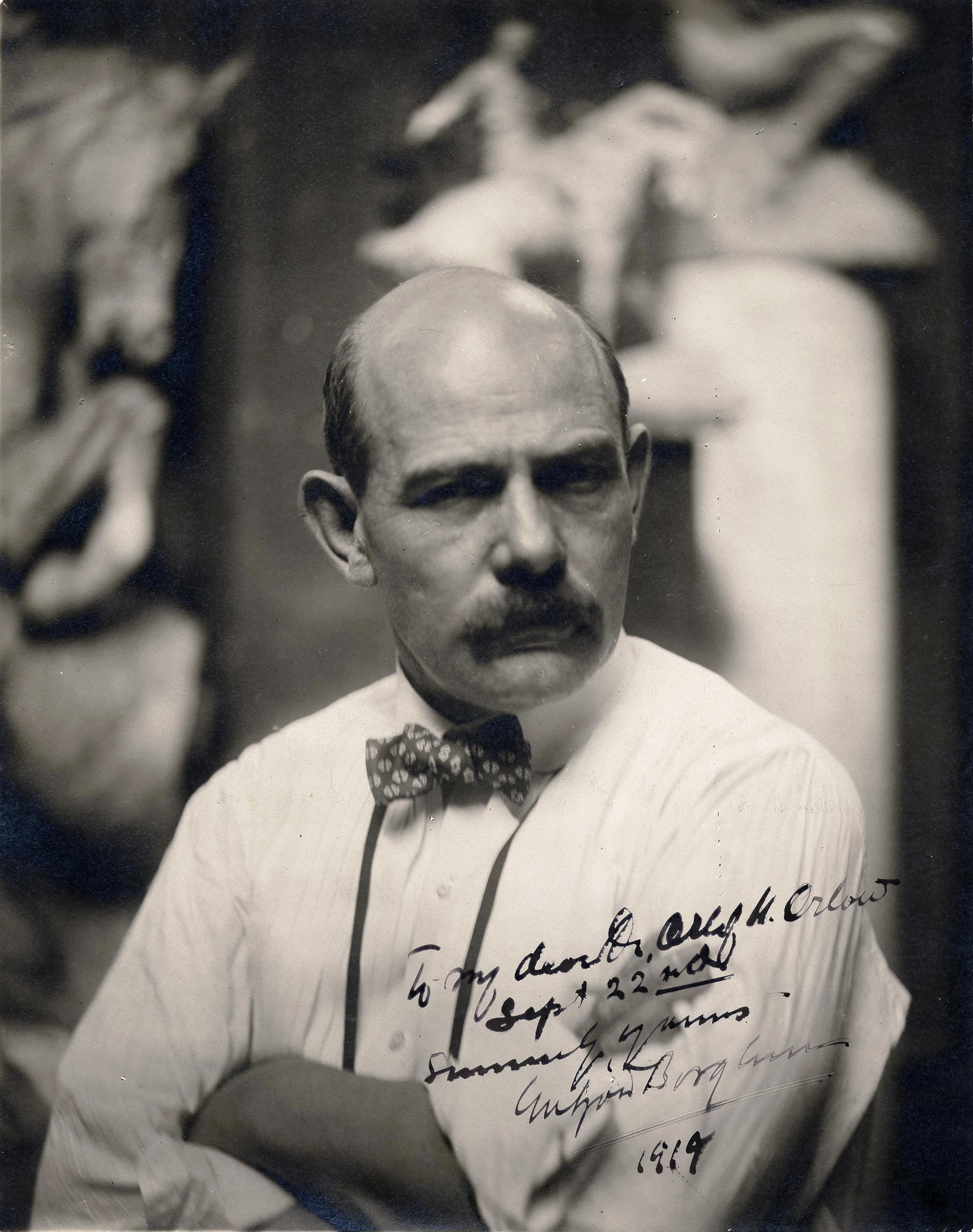
Gutzon Borglum, the sculptor of the memorial

== Thomas Jefferson ==
Thomas Jefferson's head was started next, to the right of Washington. Before the head was complete, Borglum requested that he be blasted off due to poor rock quality. Jefferson's head was restarted on Washington's left. Jefferson's head was dedicated in 1936.

== Abraham Lincoln ==
Abraham Lincoln's head was the most challenging because of his beard, but his head was completed on the far right of the cliff. Lincoln's face was finally dedicated on September 17, 1937, which was the 150th anniversary of the signing of the Constitution of the United States in 1787.

== Theodore Roosevelt ==
While Theodore Roosevelt's head was being constructed, accommodations for tourists were being built, including plumbing, lighting, and a visitor center. Not finding suitable rock, the sculptors cut farther back into the mountain, causing concerns about how far they were cutting. Roosevelt's head was dedicated on July 2, 1939.

== Hall of Records ==
Due to unforeseen vulnerabilities in the granite, Lincoln and Jefferson were relocated from the positions in Borglum's original design. Lincoln was relocated to the area where Borglum intended to include an 80-by-100-foot inscription in the shape of the Louisiana Purchase.

To replace the inscription, Borglum conceived another grand addition to the monument of similar proportions: the Hall of Records. The Hall of Records was to include a grand entrance to an 80-by-100-foot vault carved directly into the granite face of the small canyon behind Lincoln's head. Borglum imagined 800 granite steps leading from his studio to the entrance of the Hall.

In 1938, Borglum and his crew began to carve this grand hall, where he envisaged the original Declaration of Independence and United States Constitution should eventually be stored. But a combination of unexpectedly hard granite, looming war in Europe, and lack of funding conspired against Borglum's last dream, though his plans became more elaborate as his team rushed to complete this work. They had reached 70 feet into the granite by March 1941, when Borglum unexpectedly died. The monument was deemed complete and all work shut down on October 31 of the same year. Though Borglum's children tried over the years to renew interest in their father's last dream, it was not until 1998 that the National Park System, together with the Borglum Family, put "finishing touches" on the Hall of Records. A titanium vault was installed in the granite floor of the unfinished hall, and filled with 16 porcelain enamel panels that include the United States Constitution and other important historical documents. The Hall of Records entrance can be seen from west-facing aerial photographs of the monument.

== Present day ==
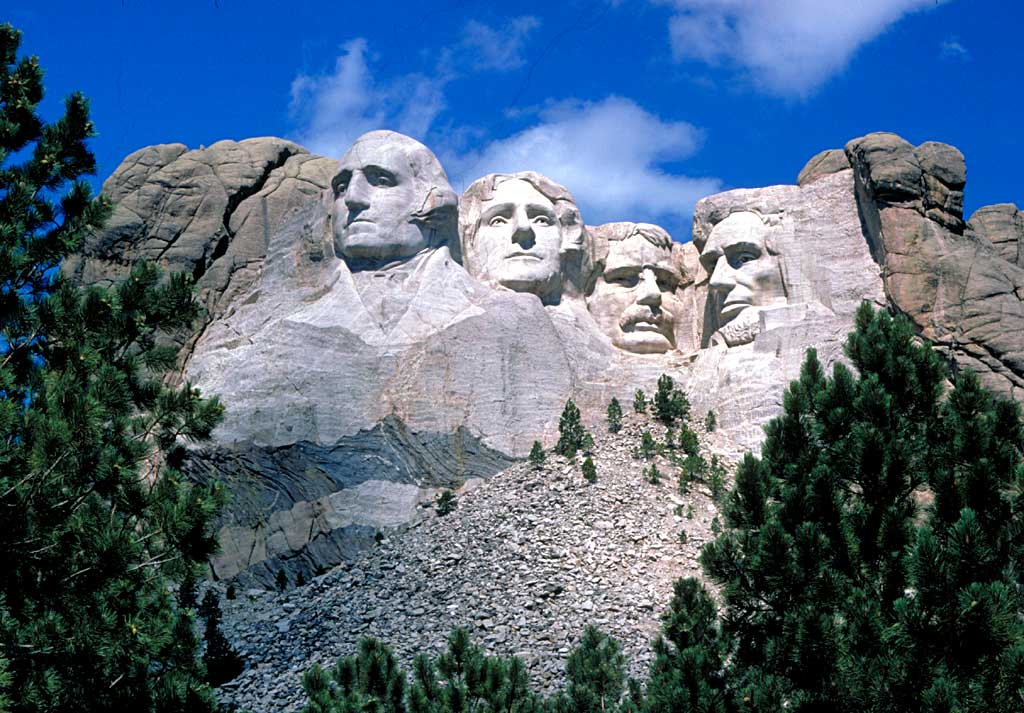
The granite remains from the construction of Mount Rushmore are still visible below the heads of the Presidents.

The Presidential Trail, a walking trail and boardwalk, starts at Grandview Terrace and travels through the forests to the sculptor's studio, now a museum with information about the construction of the monument and the tools used by workers.
