= Nigger: The Strange Career of a Troublesome Word =

2002 book by Randall Kennedy

- Author: Randall Kennedy
- Language: English
- Publisher: Pantheon Books; Vintage Books
- Publication date: 2002
- Publication place: United States
- ISBN: 978-0-375-42172-3 (first edition)

Nigger: The Strange Career of a Troublesome Word is a 2002 book by Randall Kennedy of Harvard Law School about the history and sociology of the word nigger.

"The power of 'Nigger,'" Charles Taylor wrote in Salon, "is that Kennedy writes fully of the word, neither condemning its every use nor fantasizing that it can ever become solely a means of empowerment." In the book, Kennedy explores the word's history, and how its meaning varies according to the context of its use. "I'm not saying that any particular instance of using the N-word is any more horrifying and menacing than any other such word", he told Daniel Smith in The Atlantic. "I am saying that from a broad sociological view, the word is associated with more havoc in American society than other racial slurs."

Darcus Howe noted of Nigger in New Statesman, "Had a white person used the word, rejection would have been immediate. Now white society can always point to Kennedy and say that a negro advanced the view that 'nigger' is acceptable." When asked by Kate Tuttle of Africana how he felt about the controversy over Nigger, Kennedy replied: "What's the worst that happens? That someone writes a very long diatribe in The New Yorker excoriating me...I'm not facing firing squads, I'm not facing exile, I'm not facing jail."

The book was prominently featured in an episode of Boston Public in which a white teacher, played by Michael Rapaport, attempted to employ the book to teach his students about the history and controversy surrounding the word (season 2, episode 15: "Chapter Thirty-Seven").
