= Eric L. Muller =

American legal scholar

Eric Leigh Muller (born September 5, 1962) is the Dan K. Moore Distinguished Professor in Jurisprudence and Ethics at the University of North Carolina School of Law. He previously taught at the University of Wyoming College of Law and was an Assistant U.S. Attorney in the Criminal Appeals Division at the United States Attorney for the District of New Jersey.

He edited Colors of Confinement: Rare Kodachrome Photographs of Japanese American Incarceration in World War II, published in 2012 by the University of North Carolina Press in collaboration with the Center for Documentary Studies at Duke University. Colors of Confinement features some 60 extremely rare Kodachrome images of ordinary life behind the barbed wire of the Heart Mountain Relocation Center in northwest Wyoming, where the War Relocation Authority confined some 14,000 Japanese resident aliens and Japanese Americans between 1942 and 1945 on account of their ancestry. The book won the Western History Association's 2013 Joan Patterson Kerr Award for the best illustrated history of the American West.

He is also the author of American Inquisition: The Hunt for Japanese American Disloyalty in World War II which was published in 2007 by The University of North Carolina Press and Free to Die for their Country: The Story of the Japanese American Draft Resisters in World War II which was published in 2001 by the University of Chicago Press and was named a Top Nonfiction Title for 2001 by The Washington Post. His most recent book is Lawyer, Jailer, Ally, Foe: Complicity and Conscience in America's World War II Concentration Camps, published by the University of North Carolina Press in 2023.

He graduated from Brown University in 1984, where he was a Phi Beta Kappa member. He received his J.D. from Yale Law School in 1987. He has published articles in the Yale Law Journal, the Harvard Law Review, the University of Chicago Law Review, and many other scholarly journals.

Muller is a blogger; his blogging activities have included periodic posts about his search for information about the life and death of his great-uncle Leopold Müller, a Jew from the town of Bad Kissingen in Germany whom the Nazis deported to his death from Würzburg in April 1942, as well as a detailed critique of Michelle Malkin's book In Defense of Internment, which defended internment of American citizens of Japanese ancestry during World War II.

Muller is a member of the faculty of the Fellowships at Auschwitz for the Study of Professional Ethics, a 12-day traveling seminar run by the Museum of Jewish Heritage that takes law students to Germany and Poland to study professional and ethical formation through the lens of the roles lawyers and judges played in the Holocaust.

== Bibliography ==
- Lawyer, Jailer, Ally, Foe: Complicity and Conscience in America's World War II Concentration Camps (2023). ISBN 978-1-4696-7397-4
- Colors of Confinement: Rare Kodachrome Photographs of Japanese American Incarceration in World War II (2012). ISBN 978-0807835739
- American Inquisition: The Hunt for Japanese American Disloyalty in World War II (2007). ISBN 978-0807831731
- Free to Die for their Country: The Story of the Japanese American Draft Resisters in World War II (2001). ISBN 0-226-54822-8
