= Richard Lingeman =

Richard Lingeman (died on July 5, 2026) was an American cultural historian, biographer, and editor. He was the executive editor of The Nation from 1978 to 1995 and senior editor from 1995 until his death.

== Books ==
- Don't You Know There's a War On? The American Home Front, 1941–1945 (G. P. Putnam's Sons, 1970)
- Small Town America: A Narrative History, 1620-Present (1980)
- Theodore Dreiser: At the Gates of the City, 1871-1907 (Putnam, 1986)
- Theodore Dreiser: An American Journey 1908-1945 (Putnam, 1990)
- Sinclair Lewis: Rebel From Main Street (Random House, 2002)
- The Noir Forties: The American People from Victory to Cold War (Bold Type Books, 2014)
