= Daniel Smith (writer) =

American journalist and author

- Born: October 7, 1977 (age 48); Plainview, New York
- Occupations: Writer, professor
- Writing career
- Period: 2001–present
- Genres: Nonfiction; Memoir; Journalism
- Notable work: Monkey Mind (2012)

Daniel Smith (born October 7, 1977) is an American psychotherapist, author, and journalist. He has written articles, essays, and stories for The New York Times Magazine, The Atlantic, The New Yorker, n+1, the London Review of Books, Harper's Magazine, New York, and others.

== Early years ==
Smith was born and raised in Plainview, New York. He attended Brandeis University, where he studied English and Russian literature. He wrote a humor column for the school's paper, The Justice, and was a member of its improv comedy troupe. He graduated in 1999.

== Career ==
Smith worked as a staff editor for The Atlantic, and published his first major article there in 2001. The article, "Shock and Disbelief," was about electroshock therapy, and would become the center of a libel suit against Smith and the magazine. It later appeared in the 2002 collection The Best American Science and Nature Writing. Smith helped to edit the 2007 anthology The American Idea: The Best of The Atlantic Monthly.

His first book, 2007's Muses, Madmen and Prophets: Hearing Voices and the Borders of Sanity, explores the history and science of hearing voices. His 2012 memoir Monkey Mind recounts the circumstances that led to his lifelong, occasionally crippling struggles with anxiety and its related symptoms. While primarily experiential, it also touches on the history of anxiety in literature, science and philosophy. Smith was praised for the book's sympathetic, humorous and entertaining tone. Monkey Mind was a New York Times bestseller, and was included on Oprah Winfrey's 2013 list of 40 Books to Read Before Turning 40.

Smith's third book, Hard Feelings: Finding the Wisdom in Our Darkest Emotions, is scheduled to be published in March 2026. It explores the so-called negative emotions as "not enemies to be vanquished but essential guides to self-knowledge."

Until 2019, Smith held the Mary Ellen Donnelly Critchlow Endowed Chair in English at the College of New Rochelle, and he has also taught at Bryn Mawr College and in the graduate journalism program at New York University. From 2011 to 2012, he co-hosted the first six episodes of n+1 magazine's The n+1 Podcast. He was a guest on The Colbert Report in 2007; on NPR's Talk of the Nation in 2012; and on WTF with Marc Maron in 2012.

== Personal life ==
Smith lives in Brooklyn, New York, with his wife and children.

== Books ==
- Hard Feelings: Finding the Wisdom in Our Darkest Emotions (2026, Simon & Schuster)
- Monkey Mind: A Memoir of Anxiety (2012, Simon & Schuster)
- Muses, Madmen, and Prophets: Hearing Voices and the Borders of Sanity. Penguin. 2007.
- Associate editor, The American Idea: The Best of The Atlantic Monthly (2007, Doubleday)
