= Invasion (Malkin book) =

2002 book by Michelle Malkin

Invasion: How America Still Welcomes Terrorists, Criminals, and Other Foreign Menaces to Our Shores
- Author: Michelle Malkin
- Language: English
- Publisher: Regnery Publishing, Inc.
- Publication date: 2002
- Pages: 256
- ISBN: 0-89526-146-4
- OCLC: 50155291
- Dewey Decimal: 325.73 21
- LC Class: JV6483 .M29 2002
- Text: Invasion: How America Still Welcomes Terrorists, Criminals, and Other Foreign Menaces to Our Shores at Internet Archive

Invasion: How America Still Welcomes Terrorists, Criminals, and Other Foreign Menaces to Our Shores (ISBN 0-89526-075-1) is a 2002 book written by conservative political commentator and author Michelle Malkin. In it, she states that the U.S. immigration system is plagued by bureaucratic inertia, political correctness, corruption and pressure from corporate special interests, that weaknesses in the US immigration system played a role in the September 11, 2001 attacks, and that criminals and terrorists are able to exploit loopholes to get into the United States.

== Reviews ==
The book was reviewed in National Review, Reason Magazine, International Migration Review, and Human Events, and reached #14 on the New York Times best-seller list.
