= 2006 Republican Party scandals =

The 2006 Republican Party scandals resulted in four resignations and three election losses for Republican politicians during the first two years of George W. Bush's second term as President and leading up to the 2006 midterm elections.

The Democratic Party unified several local and national campaigns around the slogan or meme "culture of corruption". The phrase was used to describe any political scandal, beginning with a national attempt by Gov. Howard Dean (D-VT) to link allegations of insider trading by Senator Bill Frist (R-TN) to the then-emerging Abramoff Scandal. Dean asserted that "Republicans have made their culture of corruption the norm." The phrase was thereafter repeated by other Democratic Party leaders, including Nancy Pelosi (responding to the indictment of Tom DeLay), "The criminal indictment of Majority Leader Tom DeLay is the latest example that Republicans in Congress are plagued by a culture of corruption at the expense of the American people."

== List of politicians ==
=== Resigned ===
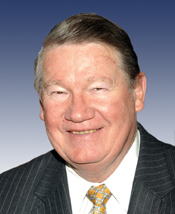
U.S. Congressman Duke Cunningham — In November 2005 he resigned after pleading guilty to federal charges of conspiracy to commit bribery, mail fraud, wire fraud, and tax evasion. He was sentenced to over eight years in prison and an order to pay $1.8 million in restitution.

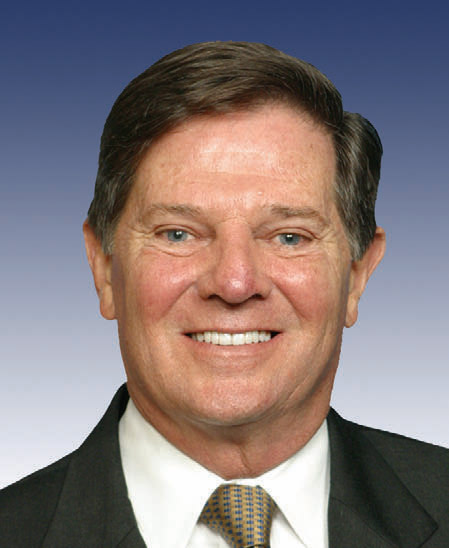
U.S. House Majority Leader Tom DeLay — In September 2005, he resigned from the House because a Texas court charged him of violating campaign finance laws and money laundering. DeLay pleaded not guilty, claiming political motivation for the charges. Was found guilty in 2010. His conviction was overturned in 2013 due to insufficient evidence.

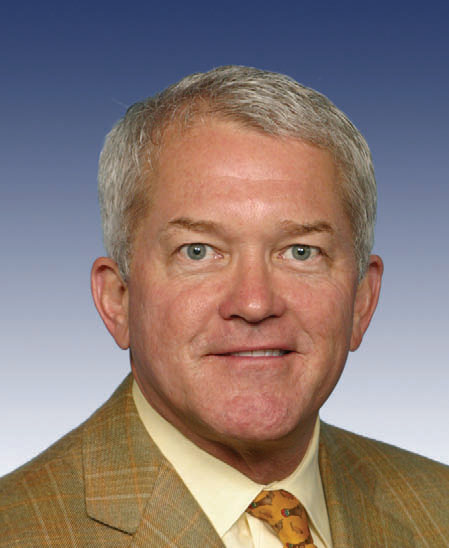
U.S. Congressman Mark Foley — In September 2006, he resigned from the House because of allegations of sending teenage boys explicit sexually solicit e-mails and instant messages. In 2008, the case was thrown out and the charges were dropped because of insufficient evidence.

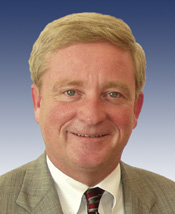
U.S. Congressman Bob Ney — In November 2006, he resigned after he pleaded guilty to charges of conspiracy and making false statements in relation to the Abramoff Indian lobbying scandal. He served thirty months in prison.

=== Lost re-election ===
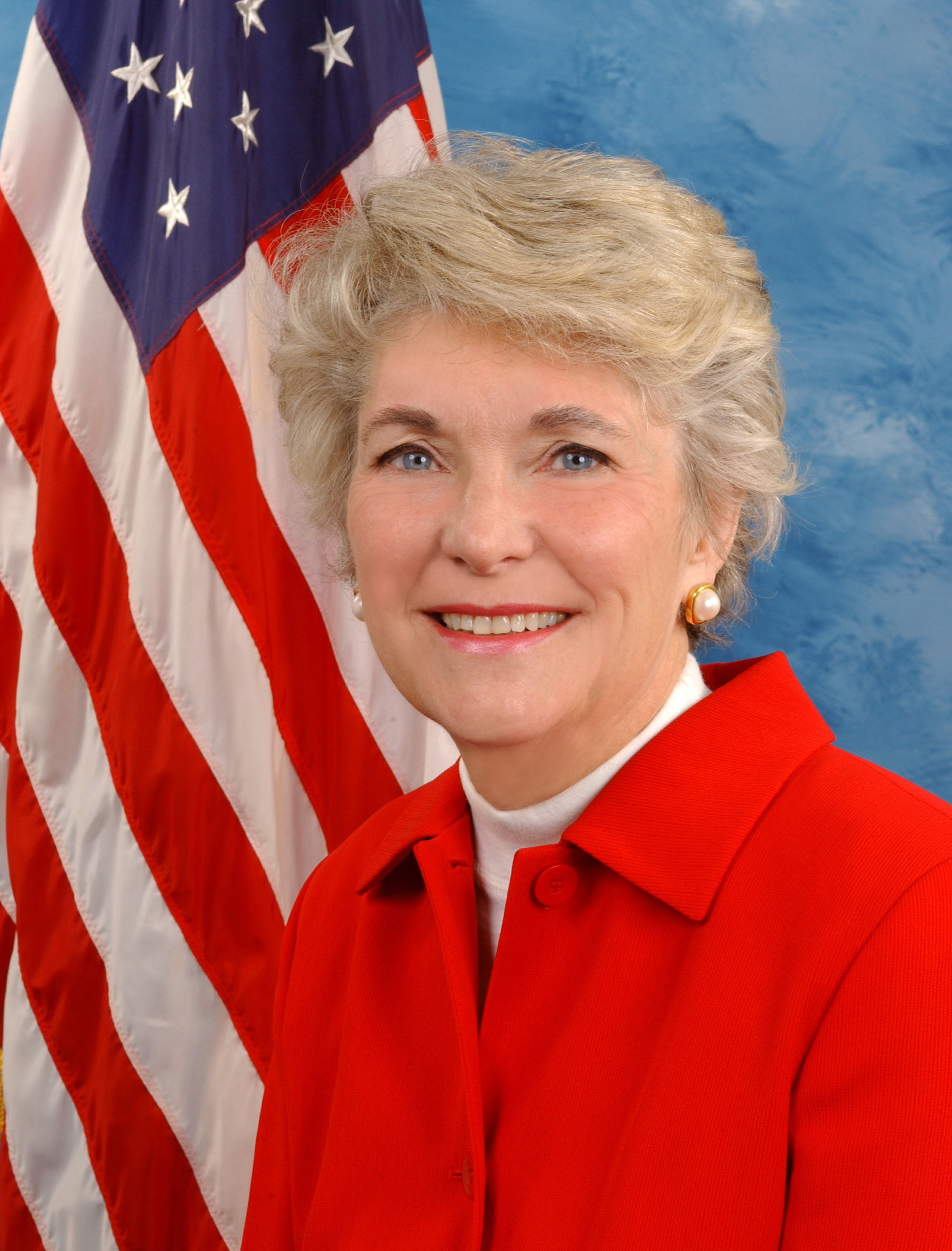
U.S. Congresswoman Sue W. Kelly — Lost to John Hall mostly because of allegations of connections to the Mark Foley scandal.

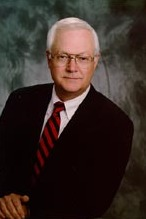
U.S. Congressman Don Sherwood — Lost to Chris Carney because of an extramarital affair with accusations of abuse.

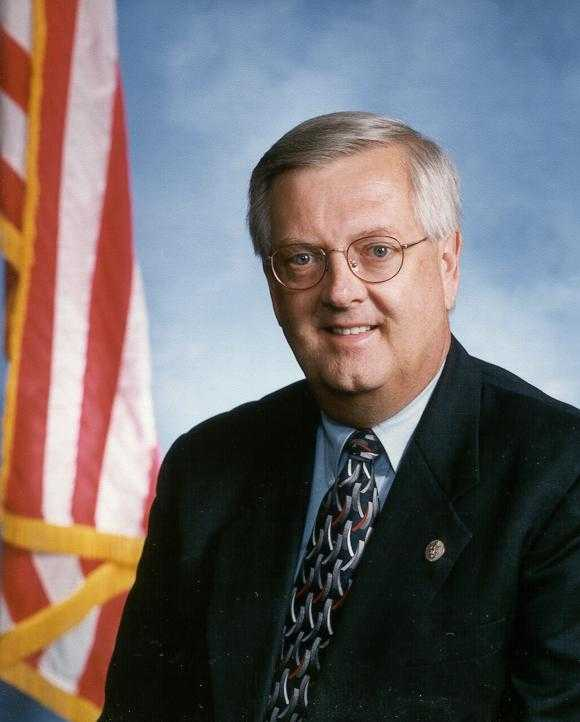
U.S. Congressman Curt Weldon — Lost to Joe Sestak because of a series of scandals.

== 2006 elections ==
=== Democratic party victory ===
Political corruption was a key issue cited by voters at exit polls during the 2006 Midterm Elections. The Democratic Party regained control of the House of Representatives and the Senate. Democrats also regained a majority of state governorships and control over a plurality of state legislatures.

=== Individual districts ===
- Arizona's 8th congressional district: Following the emergence of Foley's controversy and the retirement of Jim Kolbe, Democrat Gabby Giffords won the election with 54% of the vote despite the fact that George W. Bush carried the district with 53% just two years prior in the 2004 presidential election.
- California's 50th congressional district: Following the emergence of the Cunningham scandal and the resignation of Duke Cunningham, Republican Brian Bilbray barely won the special election with 50% of the vote despite the fact that George W. Bush carried the district with 55% just two years prior in the 2004 presidential election.
- Florida's 16th congressional district: Following the emergence of the Mark Foley scandal and the resignation of Mark Foley, Democrat Tim Mahoney won the special election with 50% of the vote despite the fact that George W. Bush carried the district with 54% just two years prior in the 2004 presidential election. Mahoney lost re-election in 2008.
- New York's 19th congressional district: Following the emergence of the Foley scandal, Republican Sue W. Kelly was defeated by Democrat John Hall with 51% of the vote despite the fact that George W. Bush carried the district with 54% just two years prior in the 2004 presidential election.
- Pennsylvania's 7th congressional district: Following the emergence of numerous controversies, Republican Curt Weldon was defeated by Democrat Joe Sestak with 56% of the vote.
- Pennsylvania's 10th congressional district: Following the emergence of an extramarital affair, Republican Don Sherwood was defeated by Democrat Chris Carney with 53% of the vote despite the fact that George W. Bush carried the district with 60% just two years prior in the 2004 presidential election..
- Texas's 22nd congressional district: Following the emergence of the Tom DeLay campaign finance investigation and the resignation of Tom DeLay, Democrat Nick Lampson won the special election with 51% of the vote despite the fact that George W. Bush carried the district with 64% just two years prior in the 2004 presidential election. Lampson lost re-election in 2008.

== Republican response ==
=== Background ===
Responding to the use of the phrase "culture of corruption" by the Democratic Party, authors Lynn Vincent and Robert Stacy McCain published "Donkey Cons" in April, 2006. A review on right-wing web site WorldNet Daily said: "Vincent and McCain do not claim that the Republican Party boasts only the good, the pure and the beautiful, as Aristotle said..." Democrat William Jefferson was re-elected in his district despite the ongoing investigation, which some political commentators such as Rush Limbaugh have decried as a hypocrisy of the "culture of corruption" label with which the DNC had been branding the Republicans.

Republicans have also accused House Speaker Nancy Pelosi of hypocrisy, who had promised to "drain the swamp" and have "the most open, most honest, most ethical Congress in history," while defending the unethical former House Ways and Means Chair Charlie Rangel.

=== 2006 Democratic party scandals ===
While usually avoiding using the phrase, Republicans responded to Democratic charges by pointing out that Democrats had also been involved in similar scandals. These Democrats included:

- Congressman William J. Jefferson, whose Congressional offices were raided by the FBI in May 2006
- Alabama Governor Don Siegelman, convicted on corruption charges in June 2006

=== List of scandals ===
- Jack Abramoff Indian lobbying scandal
- Mark Foley scandal
- Tom DeLay campaign finance investigation
- Plame affair
- Cunningham scandal
- Jerry Lewis – Lowery lobbying firm controversy
- Bush administration payment of columnists

== See also ==
- Culture of Life
- Culture of Death
