= List of physician writers =

Physicians who write on non-medical topics

Physician writers are physicians who write creatively in fields outside their practice of medicine.

The following is a partial list of physician-writers by historic epoch or century in which the author was born, or published their first non-medical piece, arranged in alphabetical order.

== Antiquity ==
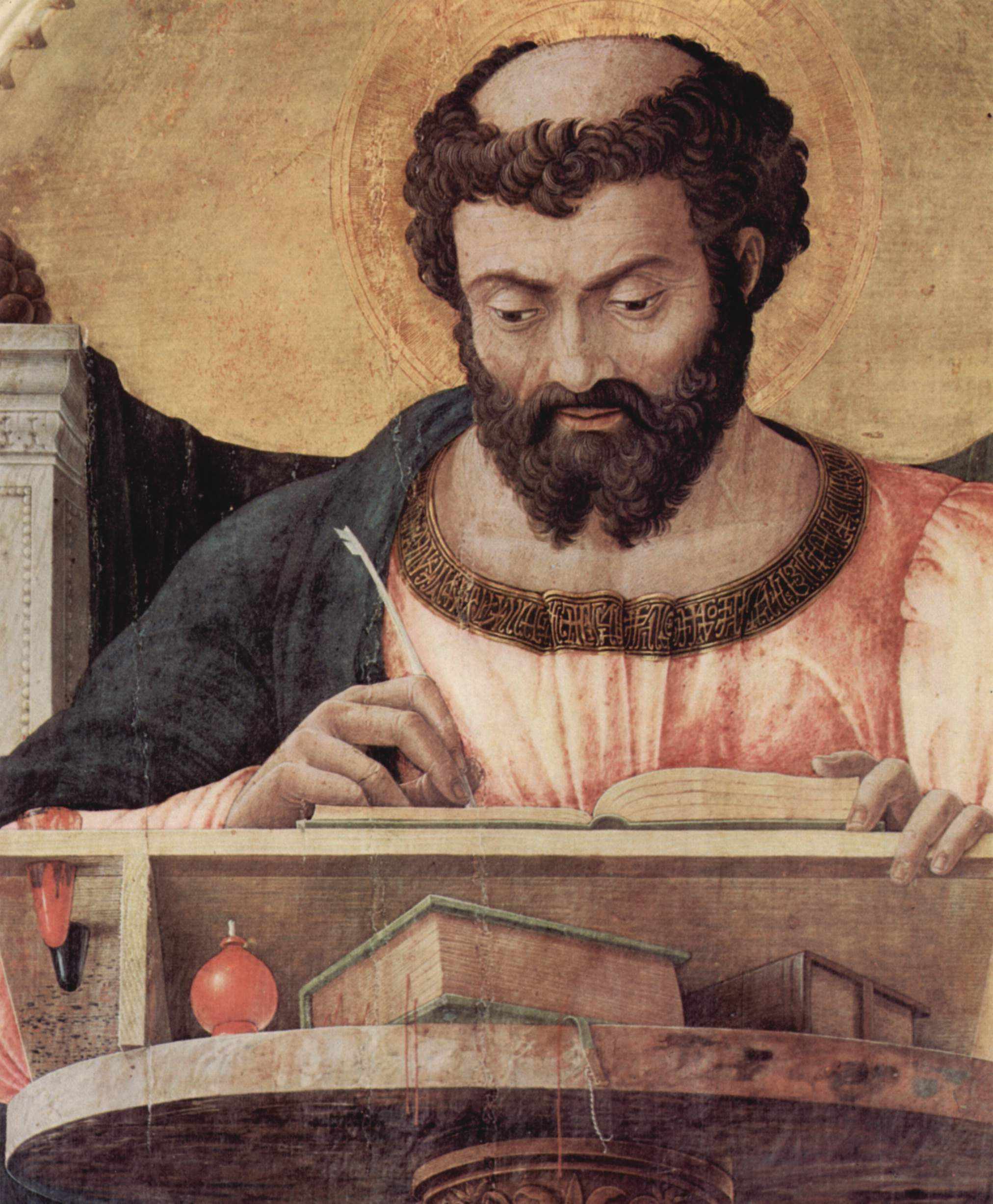
Saint Luke

- Ctesias (5th century BCE) Greek historian
- St. Luke (1st century CE) Christian apostle

== Middle Ages ==
- Avicenna (980–1037) early contributor to medical, philosophical and Islamic literature
- Al-Tighnari (fl. 1075–1118) Andalusian agronomist, botanist, poet, traveler, and physician.
- Yehuda Halevi (c. 1075 – 1141) Jewish-Spanish philosopher and poet
- Maimonides (1138–1204) rabbi, and philosopher in Andalusia, Morocco and Egypt

== 15th century ==
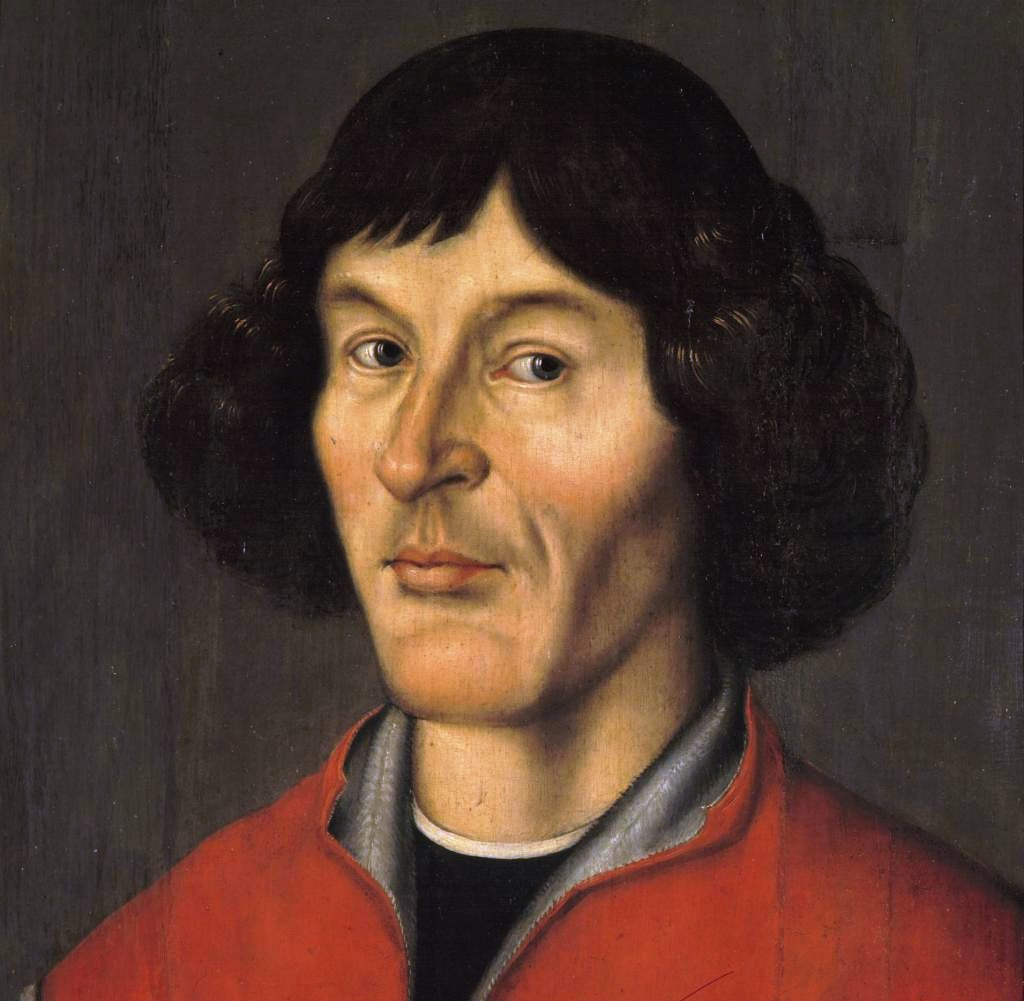
Copernicus

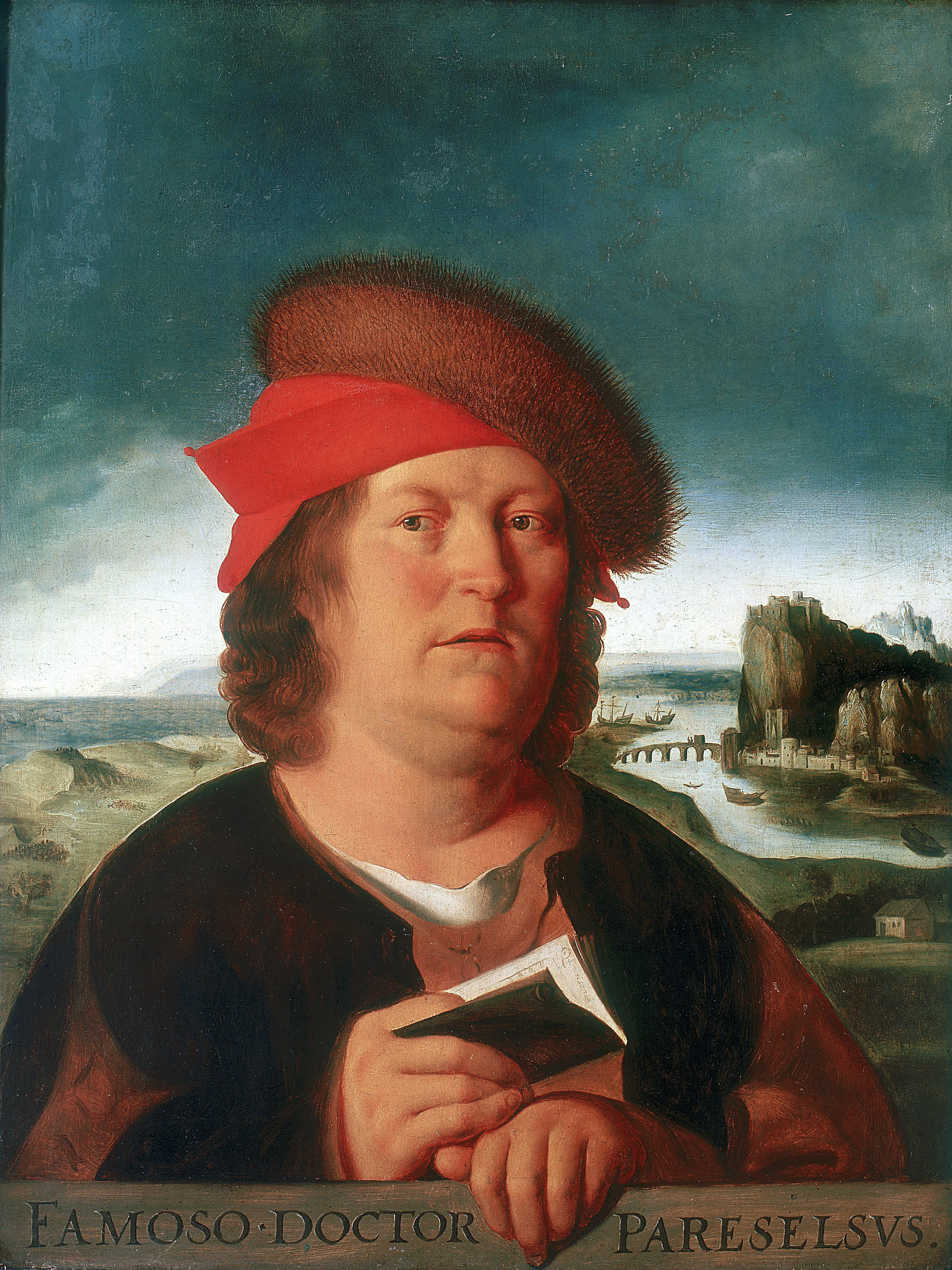
Paracelsus

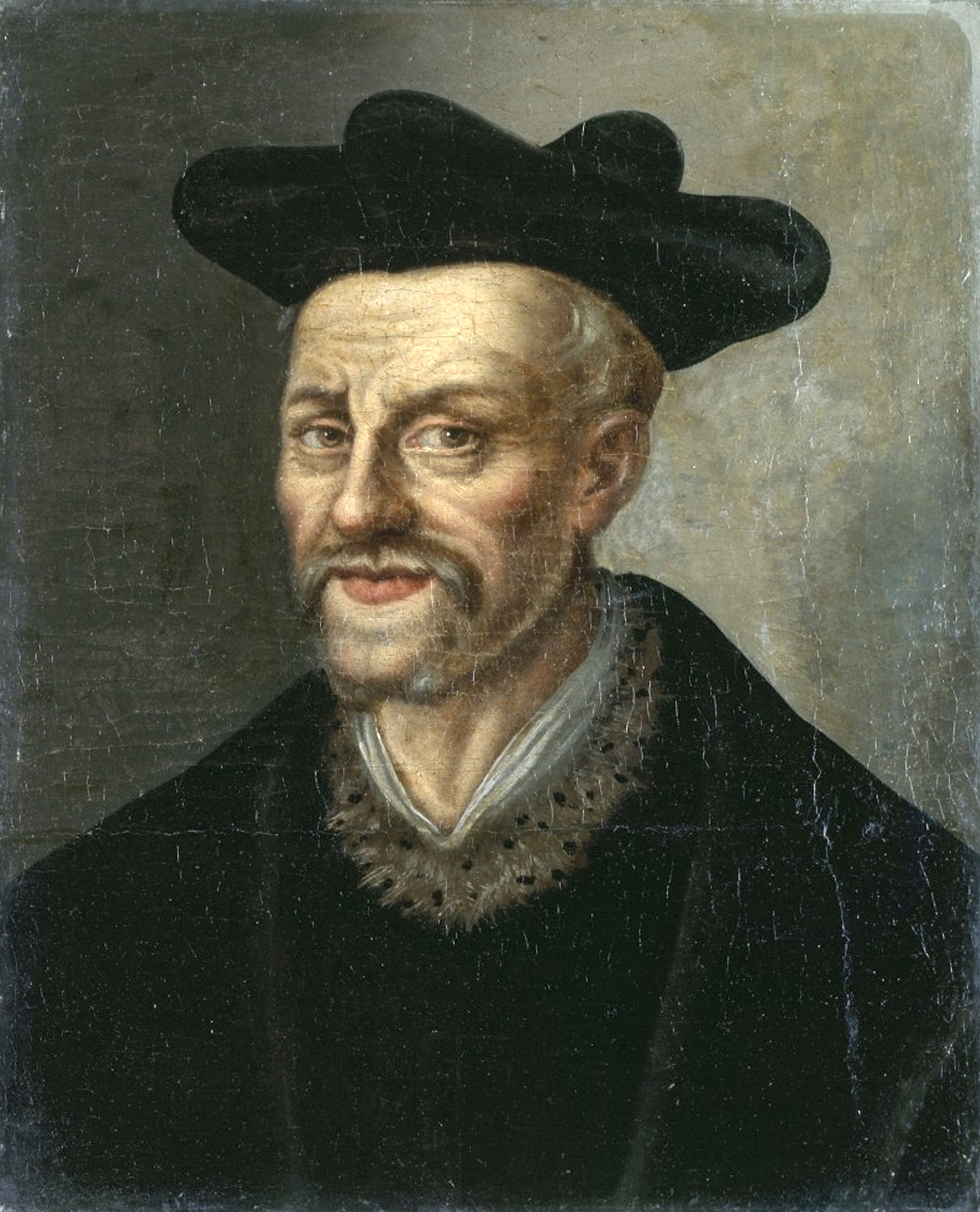
Rabelais

- Adam of Łowicz (also known as Adamus Polonus; died 1514) was a professor of medicine at Poland's Kraków Academy, its rector in 1510–11, royal court physician, a humanist, writer and philosopher.
- Marsilio Ficino (1433–1499) was an Italian Platonist philosopher, physician, and writer. A patron of Cosimo de' Medici, Ficino was a key cultural figure in the Florentine Renaissance.
- Biernat of Lublin (1465–1529) was a Polish poet, fabulist and physician. He was one of the first Polish-language writers known by name, and the most interesting of the earliest ones.
- Nicolaus Copernicus (1473–1543) was a Polish mathematician, astronomer, physician, classical scholar, translator, Catholic cleric, jurist, governor, military leader, diplomat and economist, best known for his epoch-making book, De revolutionibus orbium coelestium.
- Girolamo Fracastoro (Fracastorius; 1478–1553) Italian scholar (in mathematics, geography and astronomy), poet and atomist; as a physician, he proposed ideas very similar to the germ theory of disease.
- Paracelsus (1493–1541) Swiss-born botanist, alchemist, occultist.
- François Rabelais (1483–1553) French satirist and author of The Lives, Heroic Deeds and Sayings of Gargantua and Pantagruel.

== 16th century ==
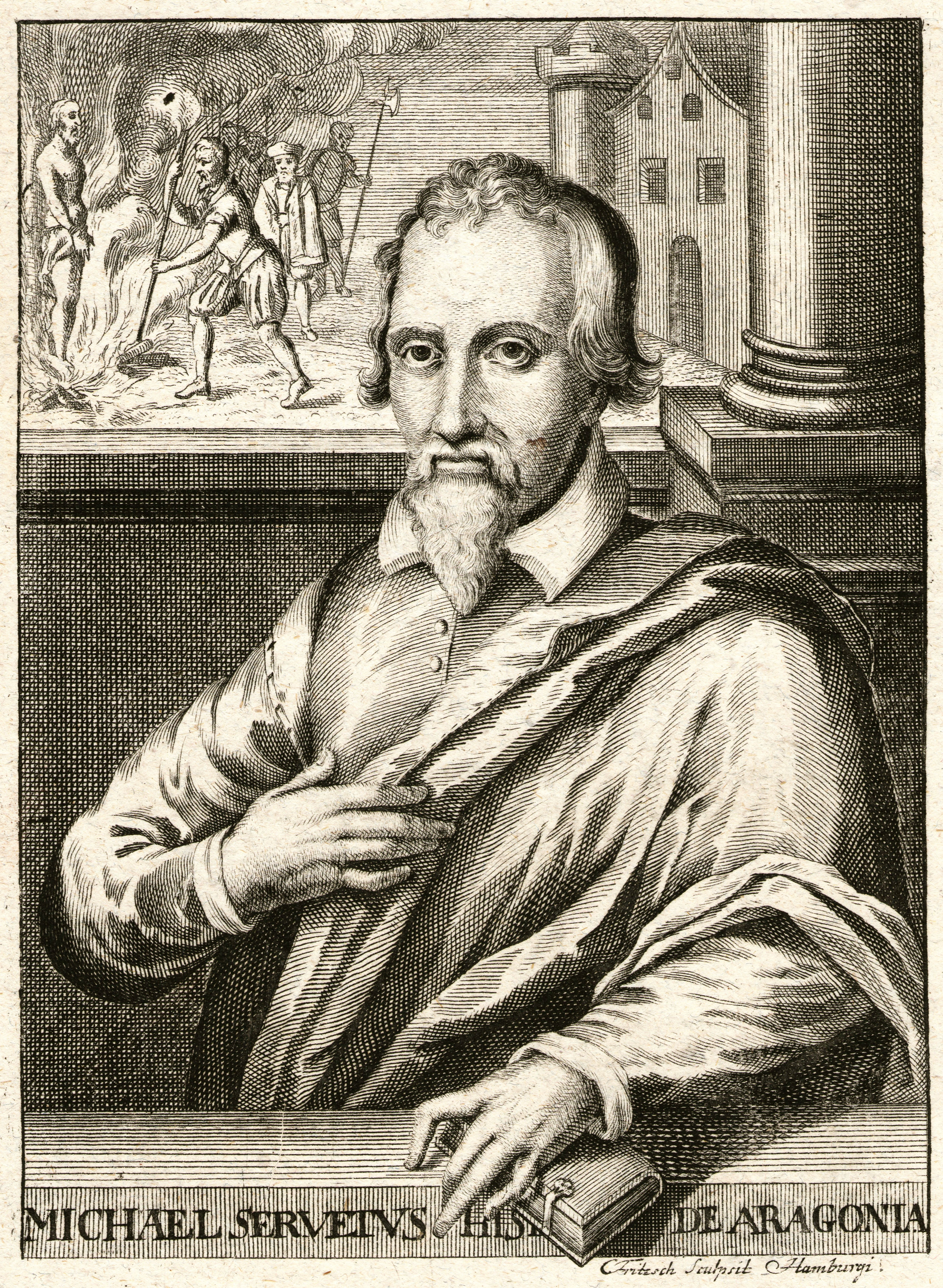
Servetus

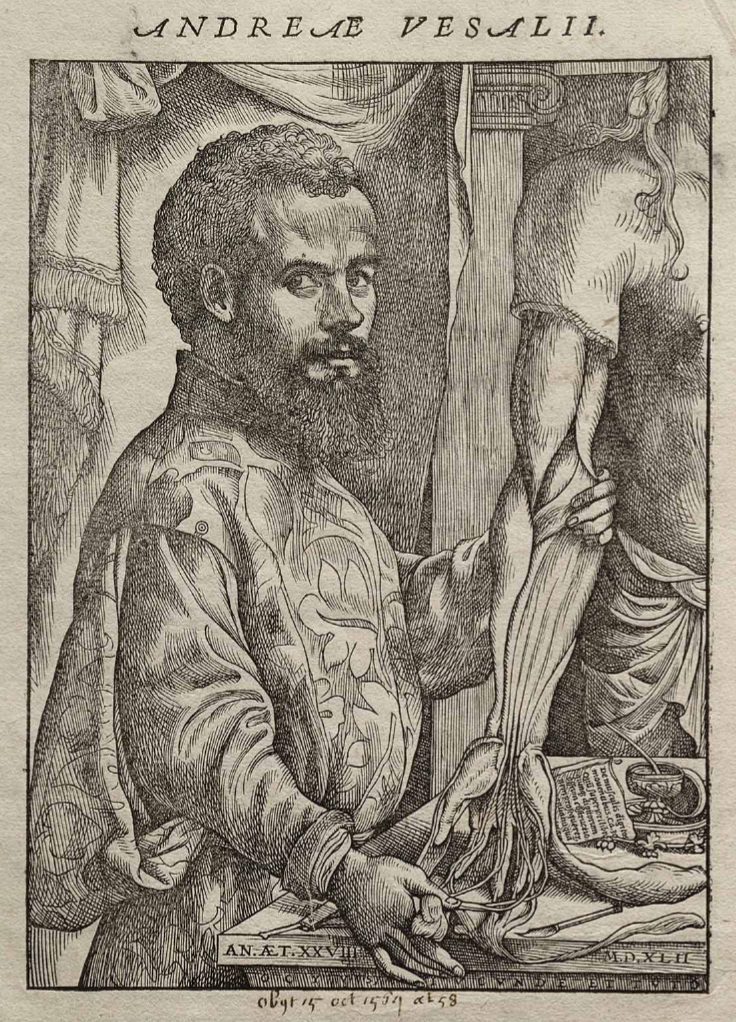
Vesalius

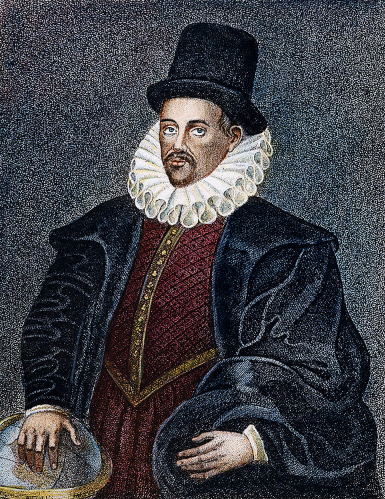
Gilbert

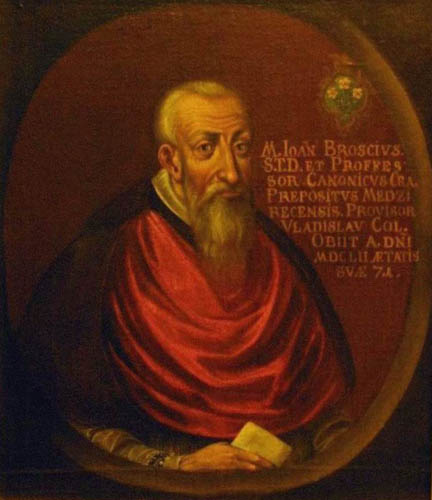
Brożek

- Luis Barahona de Soto (1548–1595), Spanish poet admired by his contemporary, Miguel de Cervantes (1547–1616)
- Jan Brożek (Broscius, 1585–1652), Polish mathematician, astronomer, physician, poet, writer, musician, rector of the Kraków Academy
- Thomas Campion (1567–1620) English composer and poet
- William Gilbert (1544–1603) English natural philosopher
- Jacques Grévin (c. 1539 – 1570) French dramatist
- Arthur Johnston (1587–1641) Scottish poet
- Thomas Lodge (c. 1558 – 1625) English dramatist and writer of the Elizabethan and Jacobean periods; best remembered as the author of Rosalynde, on which Shakespeare based As You Like It
- Sebastian Petrycy of Pilzno (1554–1626) was a Polish philosopher and physician.
- Michael Servetus (1511–53), Spanish theologian, cartographer, humanist; the first European to describe pulmonary circulation; burned at the stake, for his religious views, in John Calvin's Geneva.
- Andreas Vesalius (1514–64) Belgian anatomist, author of De humani corporis fabrica

== 17th century ==
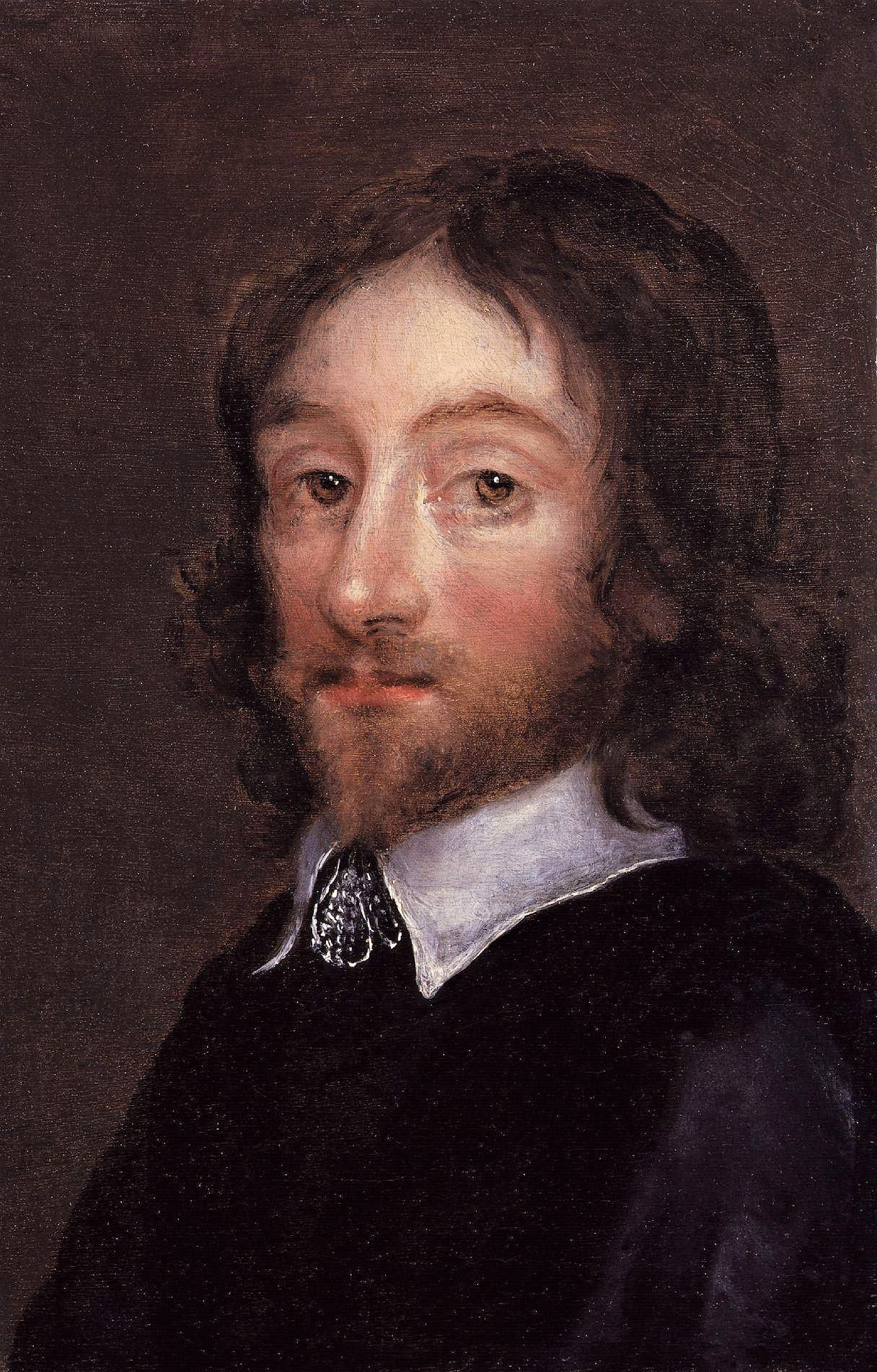
Browne

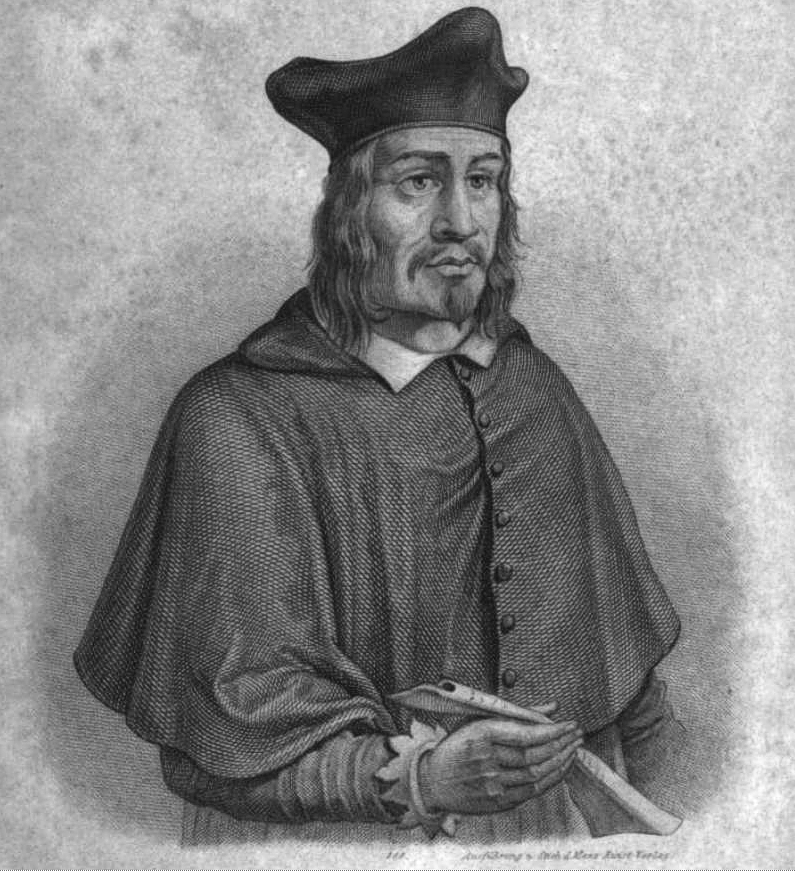
Silesius

- Patrick Abercromby (1656 – c. 1716) Scottish antiquarian, noted for being physician to King James VII (II of England)
- John Arbuthnot (1667–1735) one of Queen Anne's physicians and an associate of Jonathan Swift and Alexander Pope in the Scriblerus Club
- Sir Thomas Browne (1605–1682) British writer with mastery in diverse fields including medicine, religion, science and the esoteric.
- Samuel Garth (1661–1719) British author and translator of classics
- Paul Fleming (1609–1640) was a lyricist he stood in the front rank of German poets
- Giulio Mancini (1559–1630) papal physician, art collector, and author of treatises on painting, nobility, dancing, government, and health
- Bernard Mandeville (1670–1733) Dutch philosopher, political economist and satirist who lived most of his life in England and used English for most of his published works; became famous (or infamous) for The Fable of the Bees
- Francesco Redi (1626–97) Italian poet, best known work being Bacchus in Tuscany
- Angelus Silesius, né Johannes Scheffler (1624–77) German mystic and poet who wrote the lyrics to many Christian hymns
- Henry Vaughan (1622–1695) Welsh metaphysical poet
- John Locke (1632–1704) English philosopher, father of liberalism and one of the most influential thinkers.

== 18th century ==
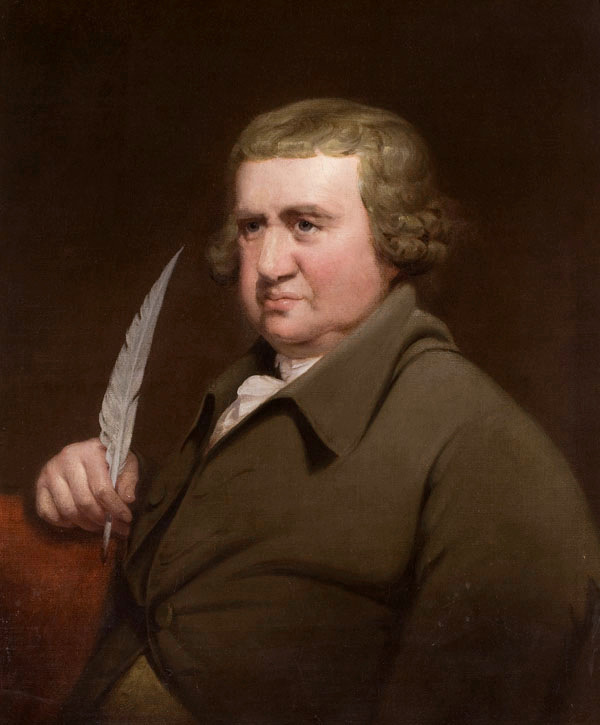
Erasmus Darwin

Keats

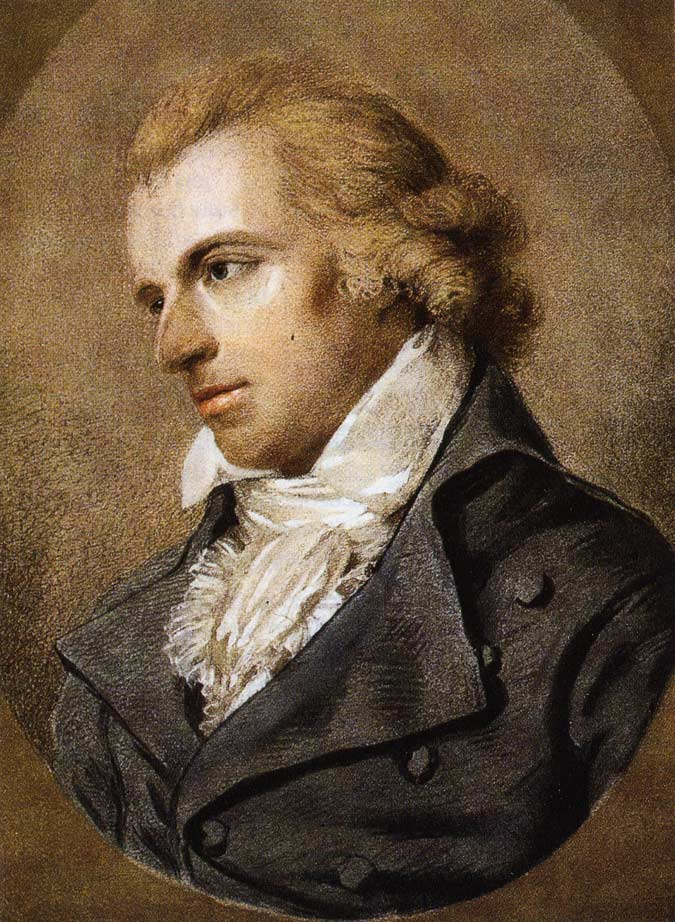
Schiller

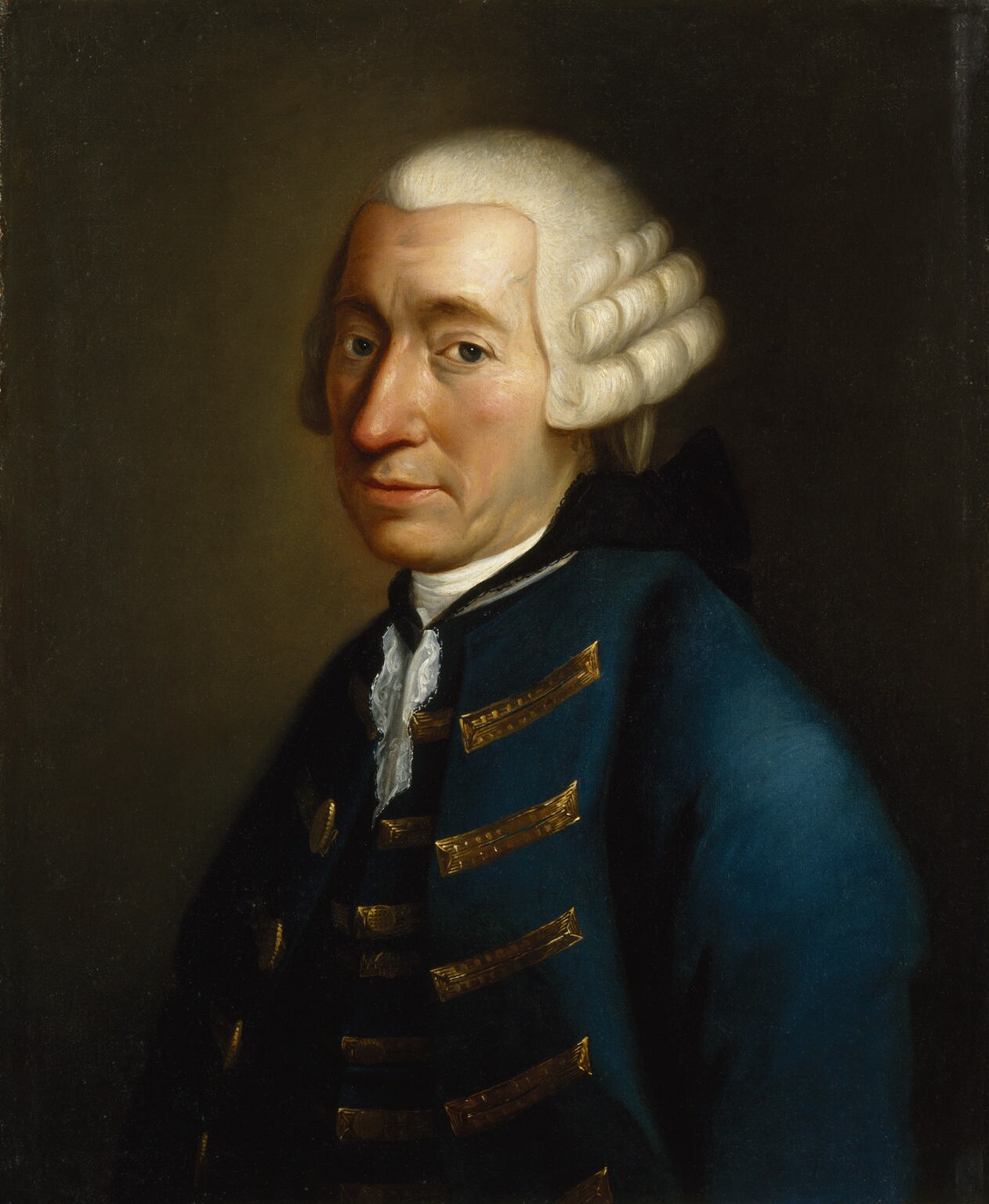
Smollett

- Mark Akenside (1721–1770) English poet and physician, known for his poem The Pleasures of the Imagination (1744)
- Julije Bajamonti (1744–1800) Serbian writer and physician.
- Erasmus Darwin (1731–1802) British poet, grandfather of Charles Darwin
- James Grainger (1721–66) poet from a Cumberland family; friend of Dr. Johnson
- Oliver Goldsmith (1728–74) Anglo-Irish writer and poet known for his novel The Vicar of Wakefield (1766)
- Albrecht von Haller (1708–77) Swiss anatomist, physiologist, naturalist and poet
- Edward Jenner, FRS, (1749–1823) famous for introducing the smallpox vaccine; also a poet of some note
- Johann Heinrich Jung (1740–1817) German author, best known by his assumed name, Heinrich Stillin; friend of Goethe
- John Keats (1795–1821) one of the principal poets of the English Romantic movement who influenced poets such as Alfred Tennyson immensely
- Justinus Andreas Christian Kerner (1786–1862) German poet who, along with Ludwig Uhland, established the Swabian group of Romantic poets; some of his poems were set to music by Robert Schumann
- Jean-Paul Marat (1743–93) Swiss-born French philosopher, political theorist and scientist best known as a radical journalist and politician from the French Revolution; stabbed to death in his bathtub by the Girondin sympathizer Charlotte Corday and memorialized in Jacques-Louis David's 1793 painting, The Death of Marat
- John Kearsley Mitchell (1798–1858) American writer, father of S. Weir Mitchell
- David Macbeth Moir (1798–1851) Scottish writer; a contributor of both prose and verse to the magazines, and particularly, with the signature of Delta, to Blackwood's Magazine
- Mungo Park (1771–1806) Scottish explorer of the African continent
- Peter Mark Roget (1779–1869) creator of the Thesaurus of English Words and Phrases (Roget's Thesaurus)
- Friedrich von Schiller (1759–1805) German writer, poet, essayist and dramatist; friend of Goethe. He was an army surgeon before achieving fame as a writer.
- Tobias Smollett (1721–71) Scottish author, known for his picaresque novels, such as The Adventures of Roderick Random (1748); best known work is The Expedition of Humphry Clinker

== 19th century ==
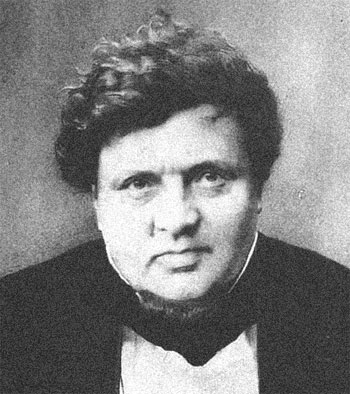
Aarestrup

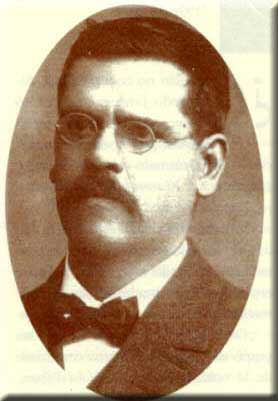
Azuela

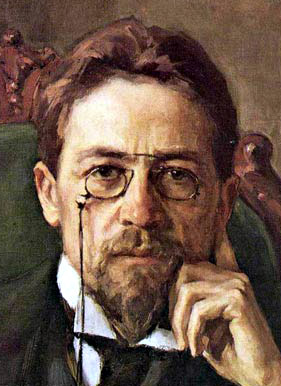
Chekhov

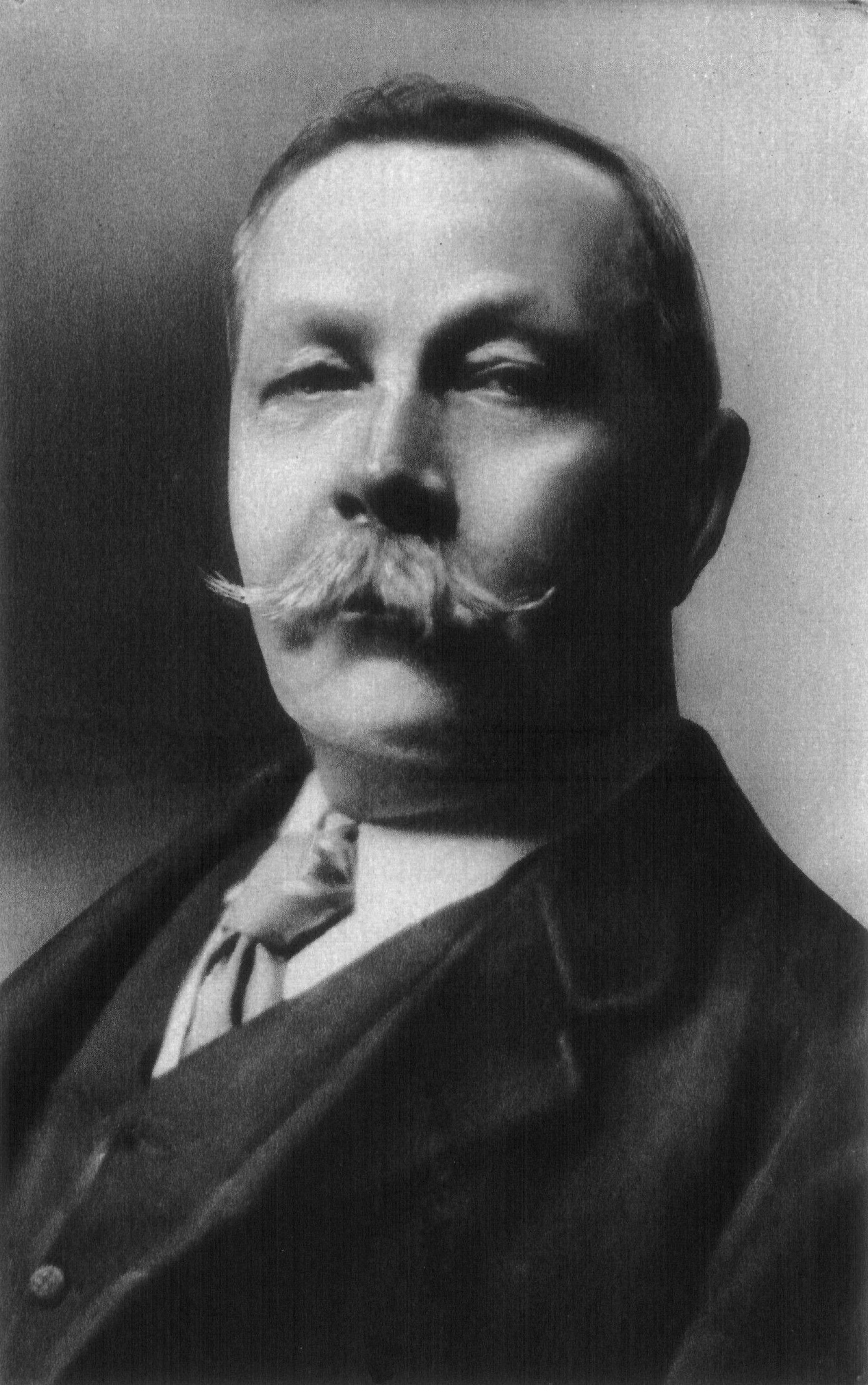
Conan Doyle

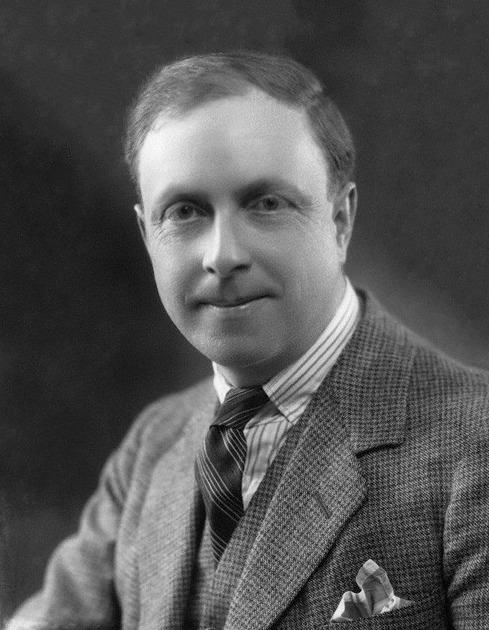
Cronin

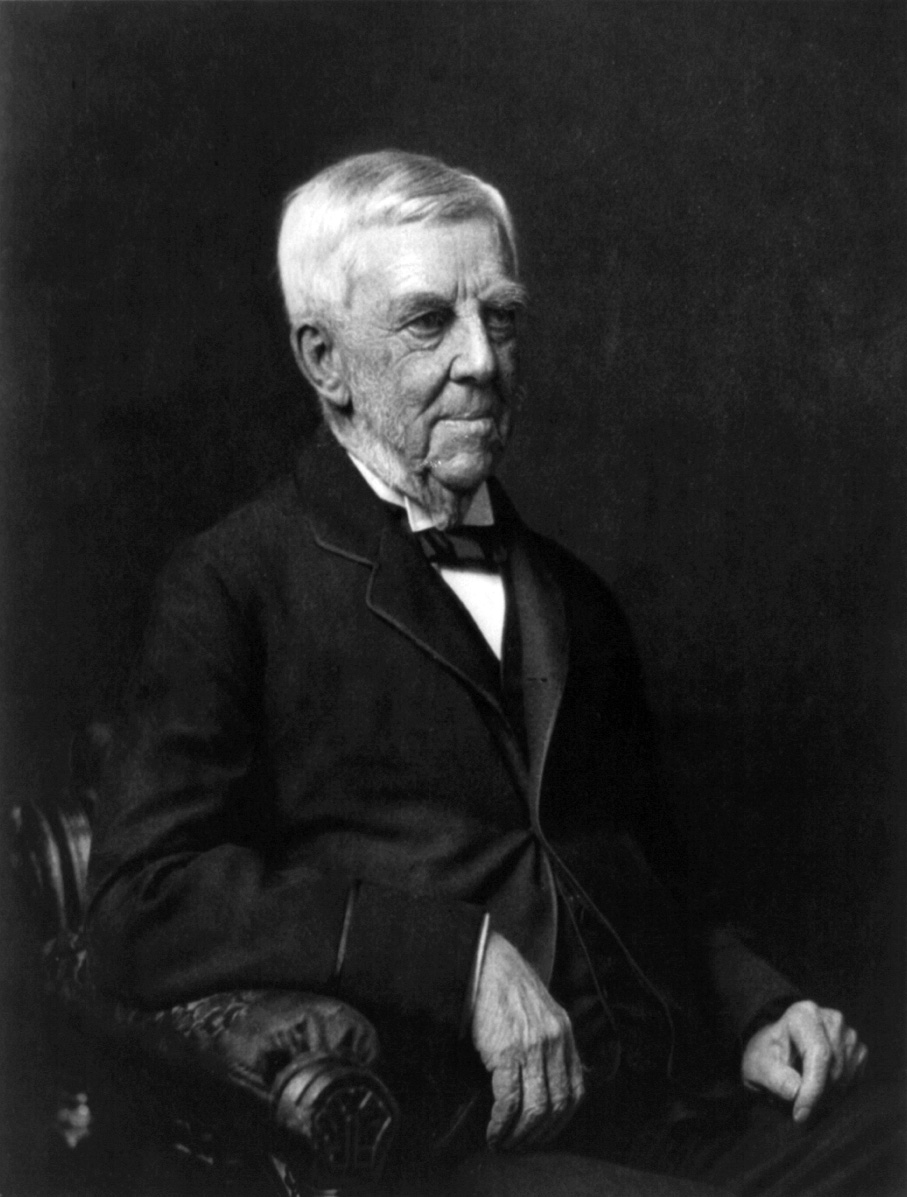
Holmes

Livingstone

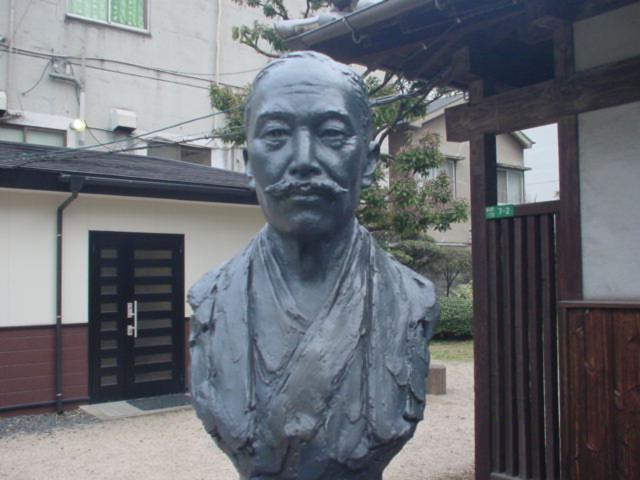
Mori

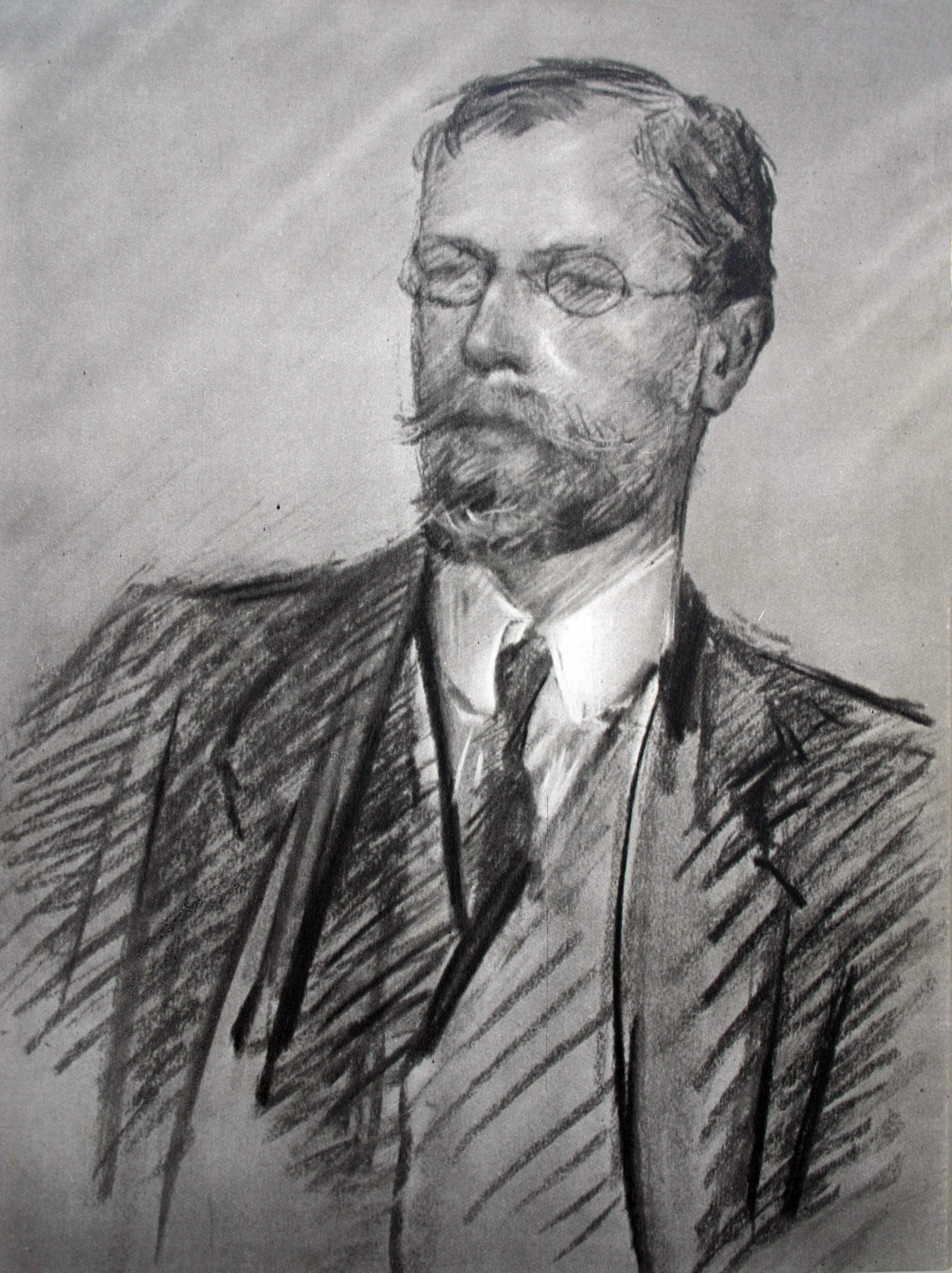
Munthe

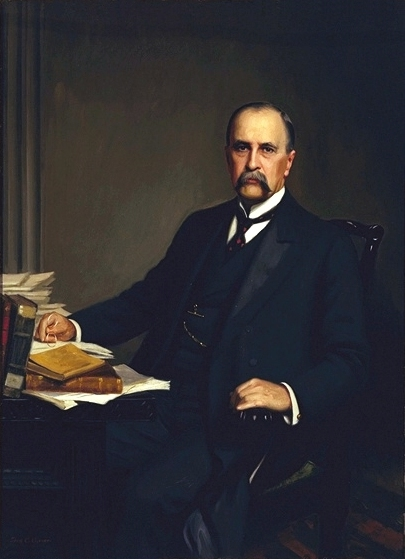
Osler

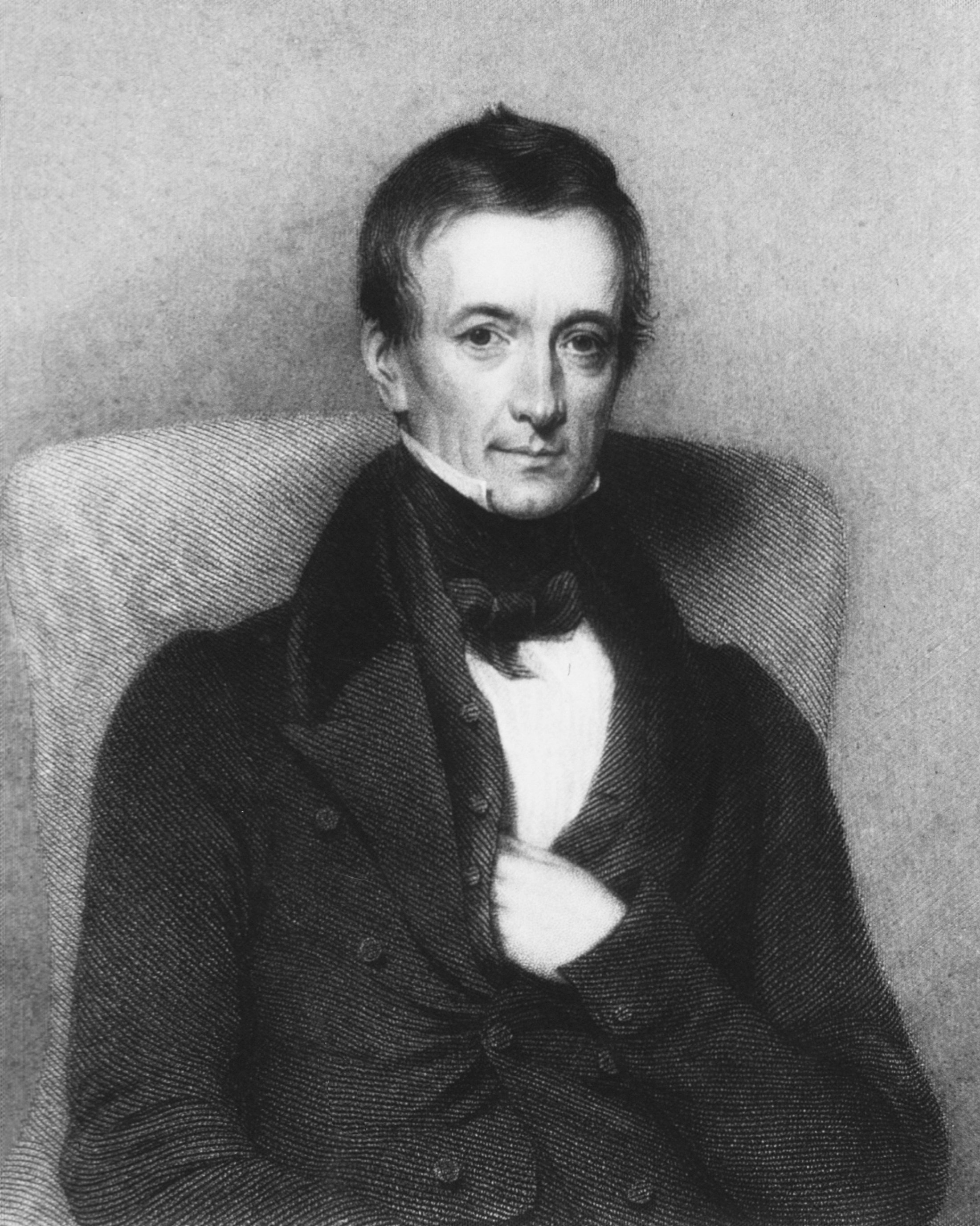
Roget

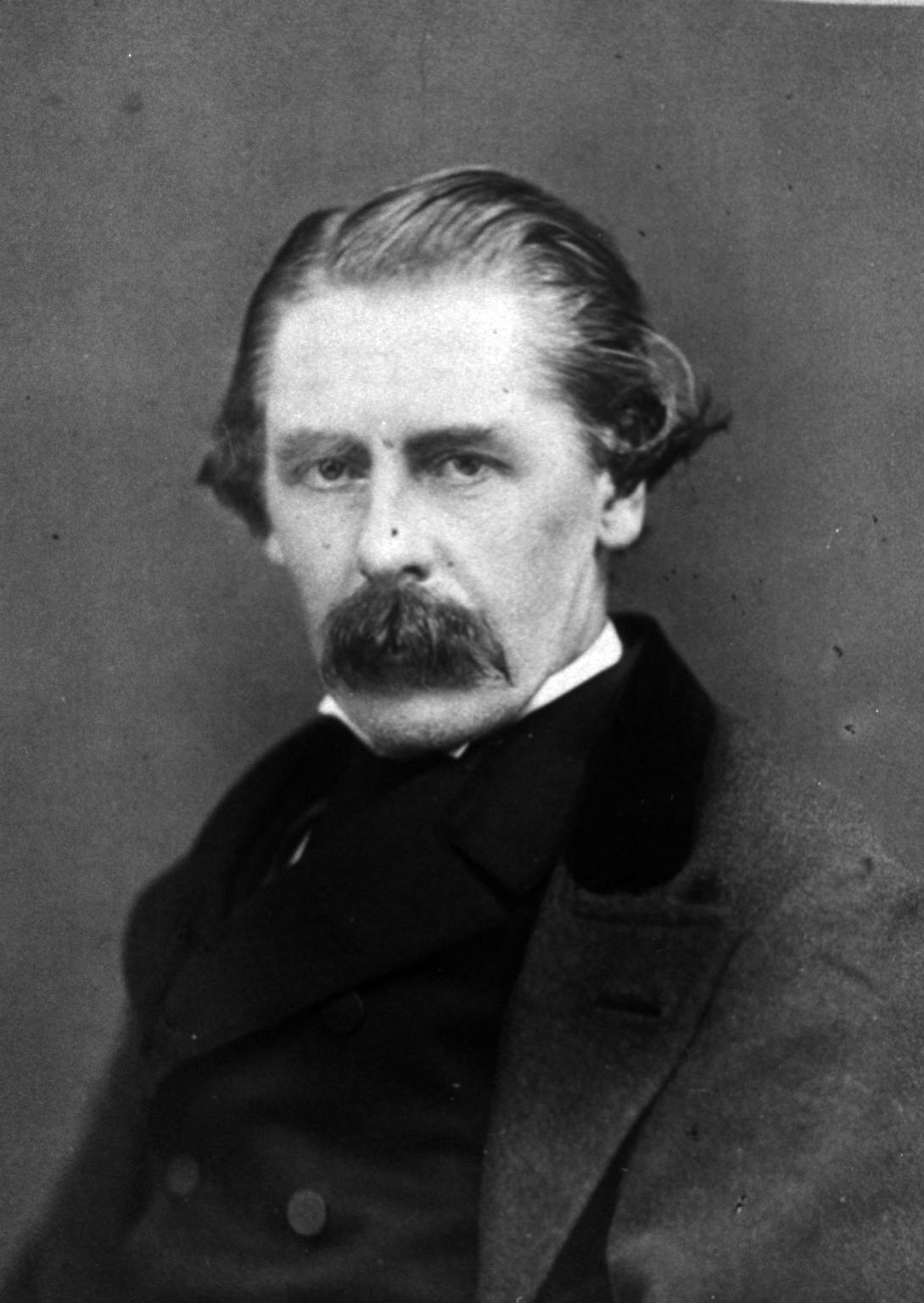
Thompson

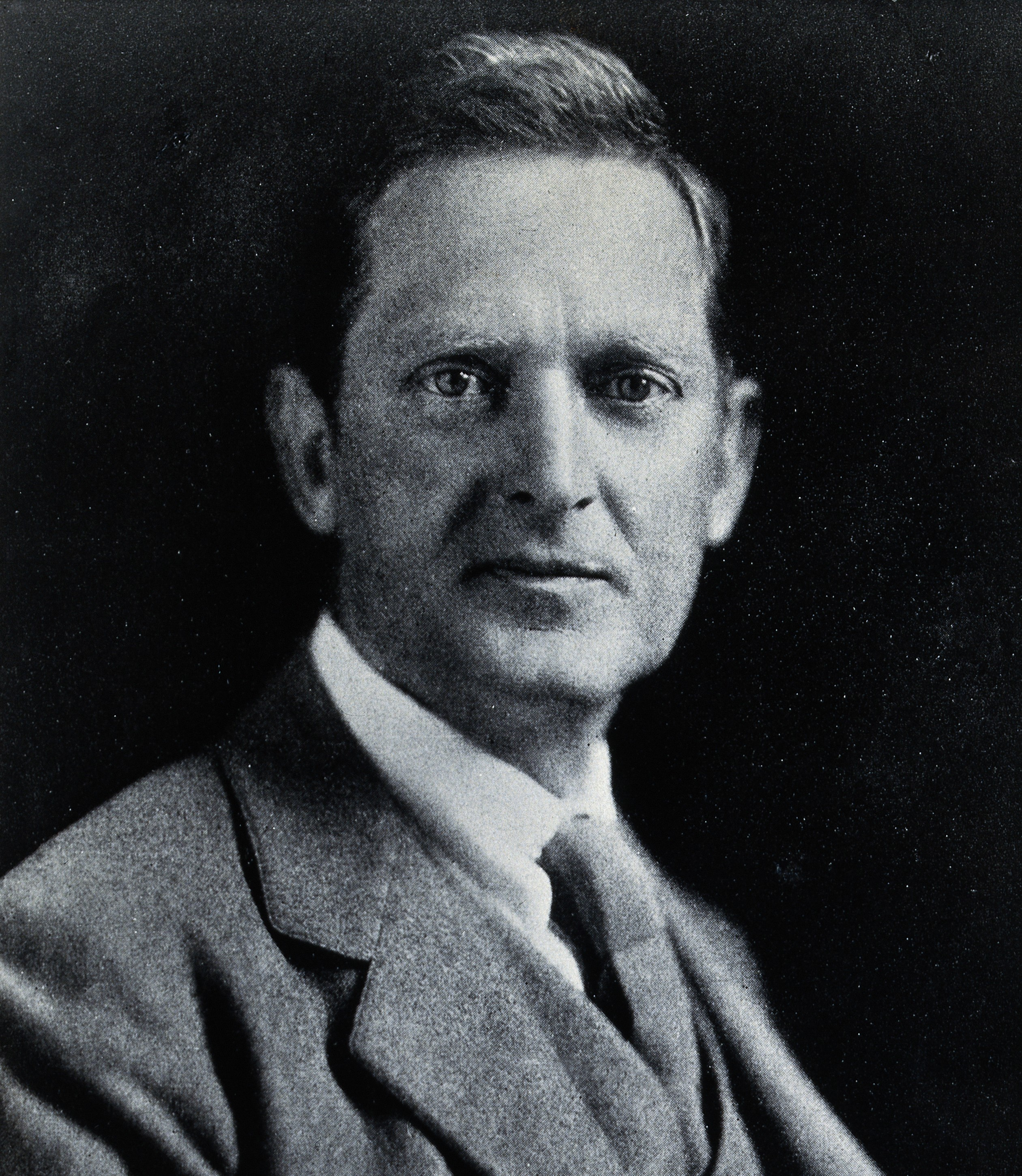
Hans Zinsser

- Carl Ludwig Emil Aarestrup (1800–1856) Danish erotic poet
- Mariano Azuela (1873–1952) Mexican physician in Pancho Villa's army; in 1949 he received a National Prize for Literature
- Doris Bell Ball (1897–1987) wrote under the pseudonym "Josephine Bell"; a British detective novelist who wrote more than forty books; a founding member of the Crime Writers' Association
- Pío Baroja y Nessi (1872–1956) Spanish writer, one of the key novelists of the Generation of '98; admired by Hemingway
- Nérée Beauchemin (1850–1931) Québécois poet who attempted to produce a national literature
- Thomas Lovell Beddoes (1803–1849) English poet and dramatist whose central theme was death
- Gottfried Benn (1886–1956) German essayist, novelist and expressionist poet
- Robert Seymour Bridges, OM, (1844–1930) English poet, the only physician to hold the honour of poet laureate (1913)
- Georg Büchner (1813–1837) German dramatist and writer of prose
- Ludwig Büchner (1824–1899) German philosopher and physiologist who became one of the exponents of 19th century scientific materialism
- Mikhail Bulgakov (1891–1940) Russian novelist and playwright; author of The Master and Margarita
- Hans Carossa (1878–1956) German novelist and poet, known mostly for his autobiographical novels, and his innere Emigration (inner emigration) during the Nazi era.
- Louis-Ferdinand Céline pen name of French writer Louis-Ferdinand Destouches (1894–1961) developed a new style of writing that modernized both French and World literature
- Anton Chekhov (1860–1904) celebrated Russian short-story writer and playwright
- Sir Arthur Conan Doyle (1859–1930) British author of Sherlock Holmes fame
- A.J. Cronin (1896–1981), Scottish novelist and essayist; creator of Dr. Finlay. Other works include The Stars Look Down, The Citadel, and The Keys of the Kingdom. The Citadel (1937) brought much-needed attention to inequities in the British medical system and is credited with having prompted the creation of Britain's National Health Service.
- Géza Csáth (né József Brenner) (1887–1919) Hungarian writer, playwright, musician, music critic and psychiatrist
- Warwick Deeping (1877–1950) prolific English novelist and short story writer; most famous novel is Sorrell and Son (1925)
- Júlio Dinis, pseudonym of Joaquim Guilherme Gomes Coelho (1839–1871) was a Portuguese doctor and writer.
- Alfred Döblin (1878–1957) was a German novelist, essayist, and doctor, best known for his novel Berlin Alexanderplatz (1929).
- Vladan Đorđević (1844–1930)
- William Henry Drummond (1854–1907) Irish-Canadian poet of the habitant
- Georges Duhamel (1884–1966) French author who, in 1920, published Confession de minuit featuring the anti-hero Salavin; in 1935, elected member of Académie Française
- Havelock Ellis (1859–1940) British writer and poet, author of The Psychology of Sex
- Rudolph Fisher (1897–1934) African-American writer who was an active participant in the Harlem Renaissance, primarily as a novelist, but also as a musician
- R. Austin Freeman (1862–1943) British writer of detective stories, most featuring the medico-legal forensic investigator Dr Thorndyke. He invented the inverted detective story
- Harriet E. Garrison (1848–1930), American physician, writer
- Elmina M. Roys Gavitt (1828–1898), American physician; medical journal founder, editor-in-chief
- William Gilbert (author) (1804–1890) English author and father of W. S. Gilbert
- Oliver St. John Gogarty (1878–1957) Irish ear surgeon, one of the most prominent Dublin wits and best known as the inspiration for Buck Mulligan in James Joyce's novel Ulysses
- Enrique González Martínez (1871–1952) Mexican poet and diplomat, considered to be primarily Modernist in nature, with elements of French symbolism
- Thomas Gordon Hake (1809–1895) English poet, intimate member of the circle of friends and followers of Rossetti
- William Alexander Hammond (1828–1900) pioneering American neurologist and the Surgeon General of the United States Army during the American Civil War
- Henry Head (1861–1940) English neurologist who conducted pioneering studies on the somatosensory system and sensory nerves. Much of this work was conducted on himself, in collaboration with the psychiatrist W. H. R. Rivers
- Oliver Wendell Holmes Sr. (1809–1894) one of the best regarded American poets of the 19th century; helped found the literary magazine The Atlantic Monthly, his collected essays published as The Autocrat of the Breakfast Table, highly popular in its day
- Richard Huelsenbeck (1892–1974) poet and a founder and historian of Dada.
- Jovan Jovanović Zmaj (1833–1904) poet and physician
- David H. Keller (1880–1966) (most often published as David H. Keller, MD, but also known by the pseudonyms Monk Smith, Matthew Smith, Amy Worth, Henry Cecil, Cecilia Henry and Jacobus Hubelaire); a writer for pulp magazines in the mid-20th century who wrote science fiction, fantasy and horror.
- Arabella Kenealy (1859–1938), English graduate of the London School of Medicine for Women, she practiced medicine in London and Watford (1888–1894)and authored many works of fiction, including the novel Dr. Janet of Harley Street (1893).
- Geoffrey Keynes (1887–1982) English biographer, surgeon, scholar and bibliophile; younger brother of the economist John Maynard Keynes
- Eunice D. Kinney (1851–1942), Canadian-born American physician, journal editor
- Janusz Korczak (1879–1942) Polish-Jewish pediatrician, hero of the Warsaw Ghetto, and author of books for and about children
- F. Reinhold Kreutzwald (1803–1882) Estonian folklorist and poet who compiled the national epic poem Kalevipoeg
- Vincas Kudirka (1858–1899) Lithuanian poet and the author of both the music and lyrics of the Lithuanian National Anthem, Tautiška giesmė
- František Langer (1888–1965) Czech author, script writer, essayist, literary critic and publicist
- Laza Lazarević (1851–1891) Serbian physician, writer, neurologist and psychiatrist.
- C. Louis Leipoldt (1880–1947) South African poet who wrote novels, plays, stories, children's books, cookbooks and a travel diary; numbered amongst the greatest of the Afrikaner poets
- Jorge de Lima (1895–1953) Brazilian politician, poet, and writer of Alagoas
- David Livingstone (1813–1873) Scottish medical missionary, explorer of Africa, travel writer
- Paolo Mantegazza (1831–1910) Italian writer, wrote the science fiction book, L'Anno 3000
- W. Somerset Maugham (1874–1965) celebrated British novelist, short-story writer, and playwright; wrote Of Human Bondage
- John McCrae (1872–1918) Canadian poet, artist and soldier during World War I and a surgeon during the battle of Ypres; best known for writing the famous war memorial poem "In Flanders Fields"
- S. Weir Mitchell (1829–1914) prominent American neurologist who wrote short stories, poetry and more than a dozen novels (Hugh Wynne, Dr North, Characteristics), including the celebrated fictional story The Strange Case of George Dedlow.
- Mori Ōgai or Mori Rintaro (1862–1922) Japanese translator, novelist and poet; The Wild Geese is considered his major work; began as a writer of partly autobiographical fiction with strong overtones of German Romantic writings; midway in his career he shifted to historical novels
- Axel Martin Fredrik Munthe (1857–1949) Swedish psychiatrist, best known as the author of The Story of San Michele (1929), an autobiographical account of his work and life
- Max Simon Nordau (1849–1923) born Simon Maximilian Südfeld was a Hungarian Zionist leader, author, and social critic; co-founder of the World Zionist Organization
- Sir William Osler (1849–1919) Canadian-born; one of the greatest icons of medicine and described as the Father of Modern Medicine
- Philippe Panneton (pseudonym Ringuet) (1895–1960) Canadian academic, diplomat and writer
- Wilder Graves Penfield (1891–1976) a neurosurgeon who worked at McGill University and pioneered neurosurgical procedures for epilepsy; also wrote fiction
- Bozo Pericić (1865–1947) Croatian author of travel books, reviews on famous writers and a translation of Hamlet
- John William Polidori (1795–1821) Personal physician of Lord Byron and author of The Vampyre, the first vampire story in English
- Jose P. Rizal (1861–1896) Filipino polymath, nationalist and the most prominent advocate for reforms in the Philippines during the Spanish colonial era; a polyglot conversant in at least ten languages, he was a prolific poet, essayist, diarist, correspondent, and novelist whose most famous works were his two novels, Noli me Tangere and El Filibusterismo
- Sir Ronald Ross (1857–1932) a "Renaissance man"; demonstrated the life cycle of the malarial parasite; made contributions in pure and epidemiologic mathematics, and wrote novels, plays and poetry
- Mokichi Saitō (1882–1953) Japanese poet of the Taishō period, a member of Araragi school; by the time of his death, he had written 17 collections of poems and 17,907 poems; family doctor of author Ryūnosuke Akutagawa and assisted in his suicide; novelist Kita Morio is his second son
- Milan Savić (1845–1930) Serbian writer and physician.
- Arthur Schnitzler (1862–1931) Jewish-Austrian writer and dramatist. Stanley Kubrick's 1999 film Eyes Wide Shut is based on Schnitzler's Rhapsod; Schnitzler's La Ronde also spawned film versions.
- Albert Schweitzer (1875–1965) German theologian, philosopher, organist, musicologist and medical missionary to Africa
- Victor Segalen (1878–1919) French ethnographer, archeologist, writer, poet, explorer, art-theorist, linguist, literary critic
- Jan Jacob Slauerhoff (1898–1936) Dutch author, poet, ship's doctor
- Jovan Stejić (1803–1853) Serbian writer and physician.
- Henry Thompson, (1820–1904) indefatigable British polymath, scholar and novelist
- Margaret Todd (c. 1859 – 1918) Scottish writer and doctor who wrote under the pen name Graham Travers and published several novels including Mona Maclean, Medical Student.
- John Todhunter (1839–1916) Irish poet and playwright
- Shaul Tchernichovsky (1875–1943) Jewish-Russian military physician during the First World War; decorated by the Russian government; nomadic life spent writing, translating, editing
- Adolfo Valderrama (1834–1902) Chilean man of letters and senator
- Vladislav Vančura (1891–1942) Czech author, scriptwriter and film director
- Frederik Willem van Eeden (1860–1932) started a literary periodical, founded an agricultural colony, translated Rabindranath Tagore's work into Dutch, and wrote social and literary treatises in addition to fiction, poetry, and plays
- Simon Vestdijk (1898–1971) a Dutch doctor, writer, poet and translator.
- Ernst Weiß (1882–1940) Jewish-Austrian writer, friend of Kafka, died by his own hand in Paris in 1940 as the Nazis entered the city
- William Carlos Williams (1883–1963) American poet, short story writer, novelist, playwright and essayist; in 1963 he won a posthumous Pulitzer Prize for poetry
- Charlotte Wolff (1897–1986) Jewish-German psychoanalyst and sexologist, author of poetry and novels, and one of few scientifically trained investigators of the diagnostic significance of the hand (Studies in Handreading, 1936)
- Francis Brett Young (1884–1954) English novelist and poet
- Hans Zinsser (1878–1940) American physician, bacteriologist, and prolific author. Author of over 200 books and medical articles, perhaps best remembered for his 1935 book, Rats, Lice and History.

== 20th century ==
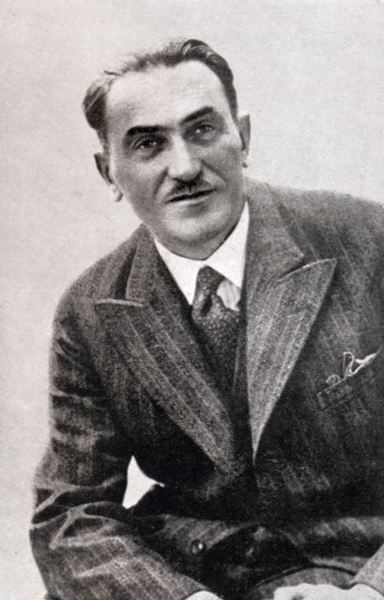
Boy-Żeleński

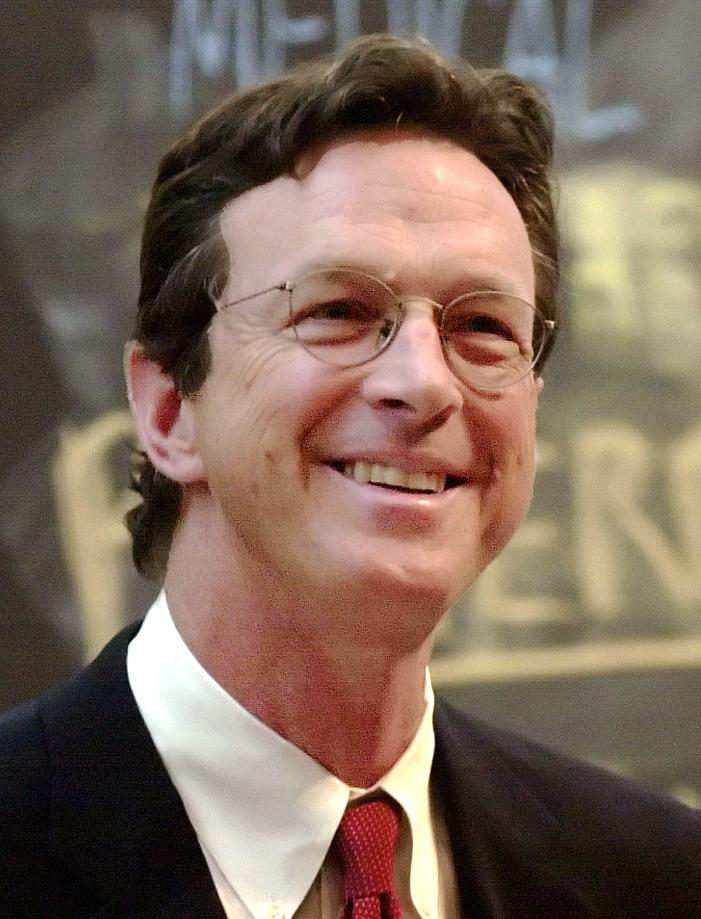
Crichton

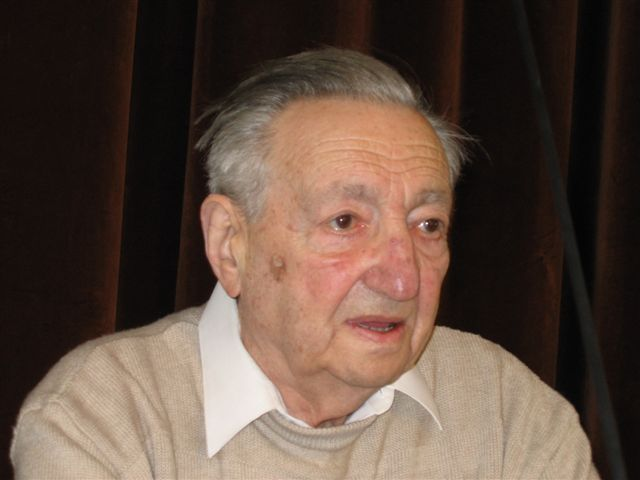
Edelman

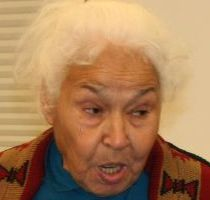
El Saadawi

Elyashev

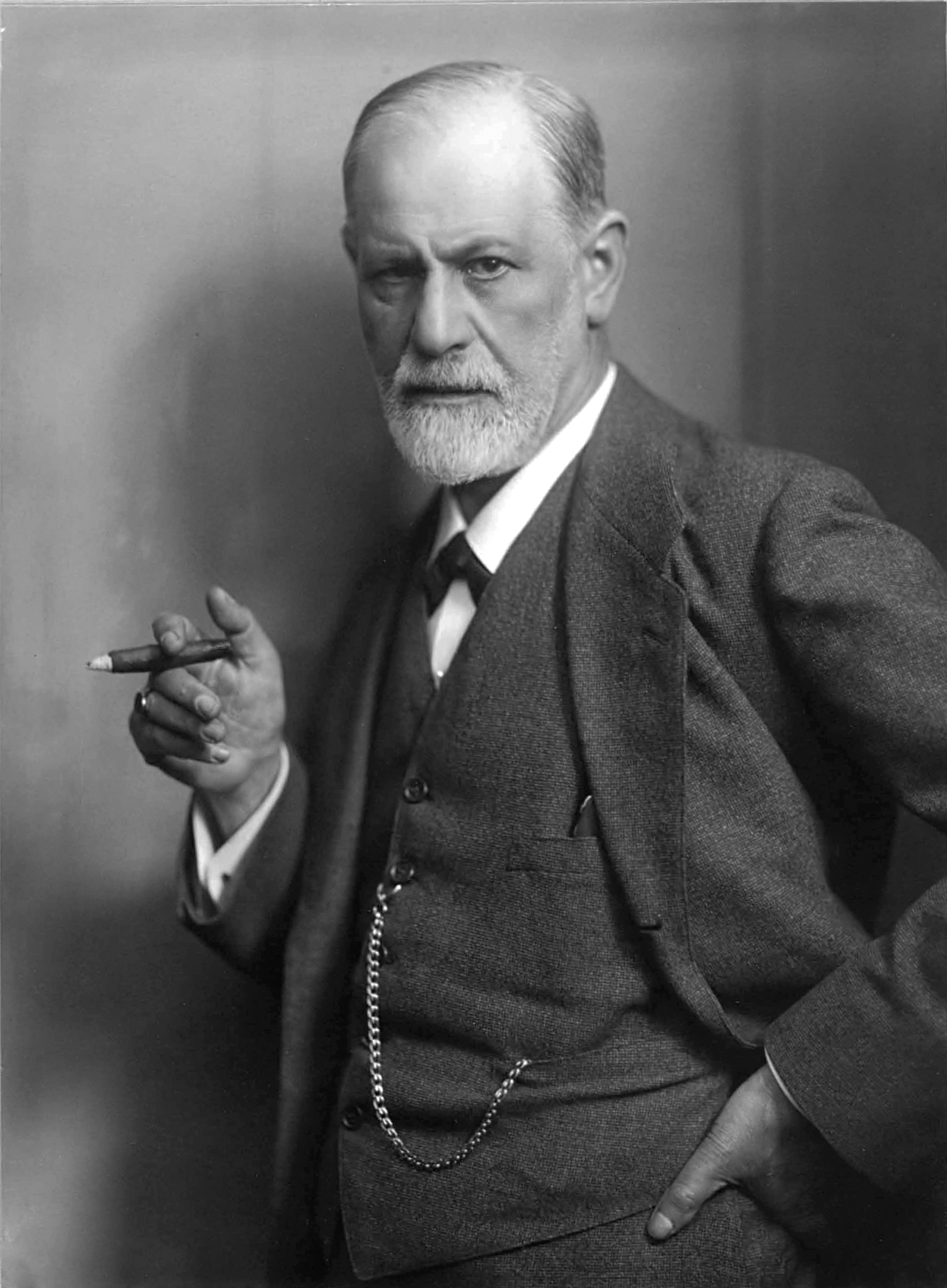
Freud

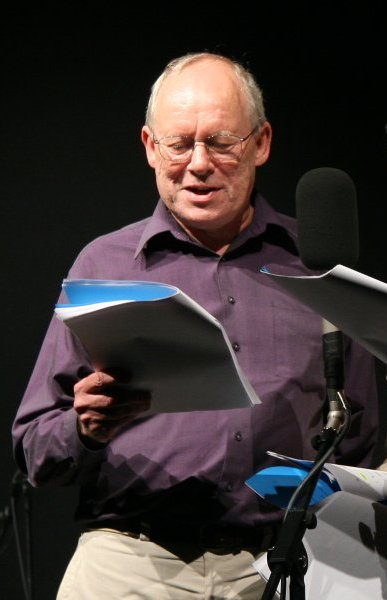
Garden

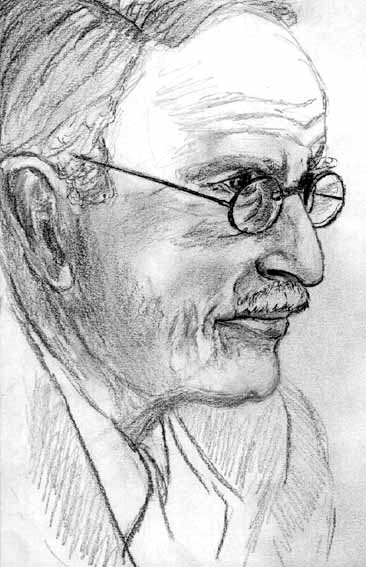
Jung

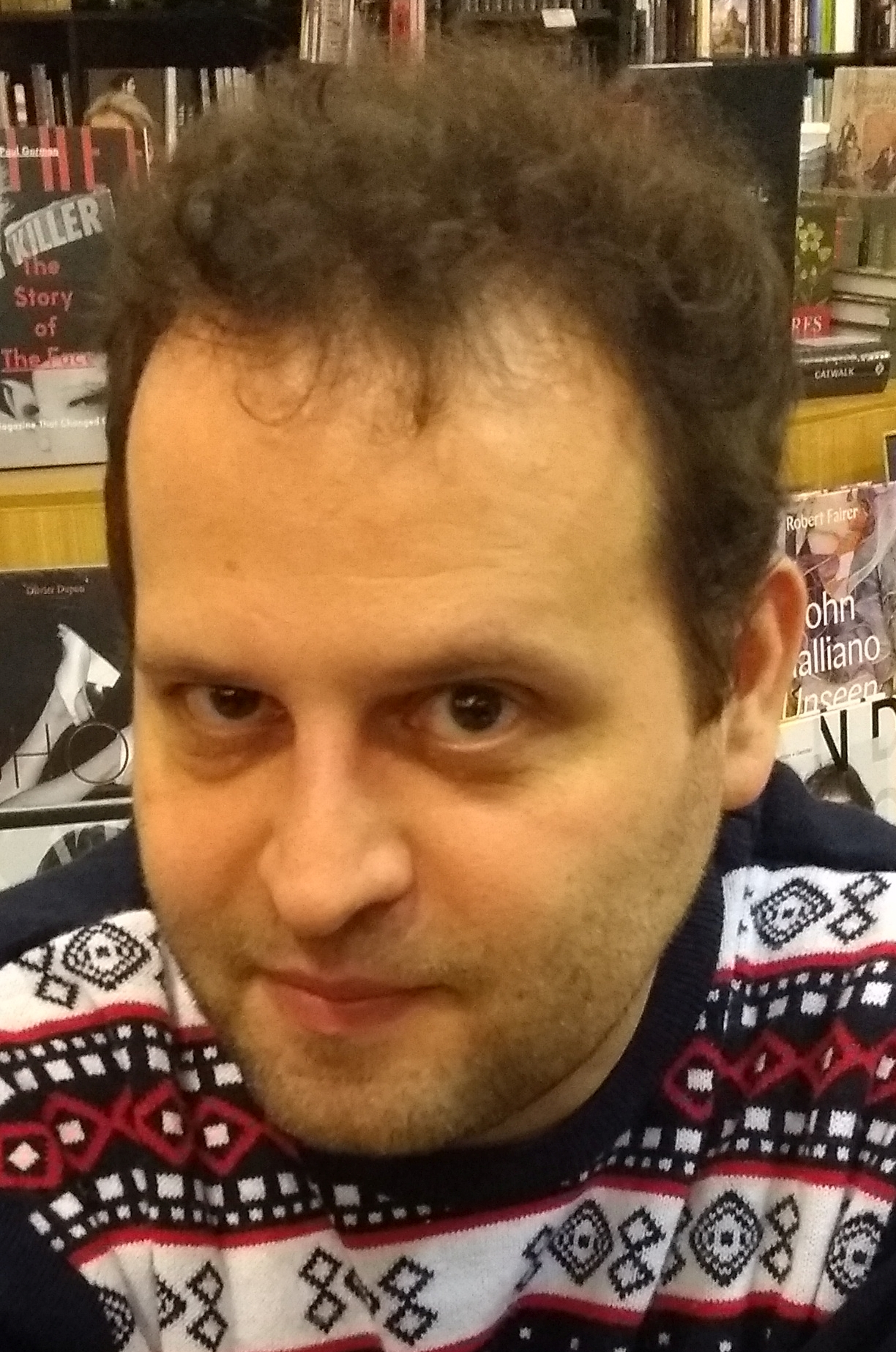
Kay

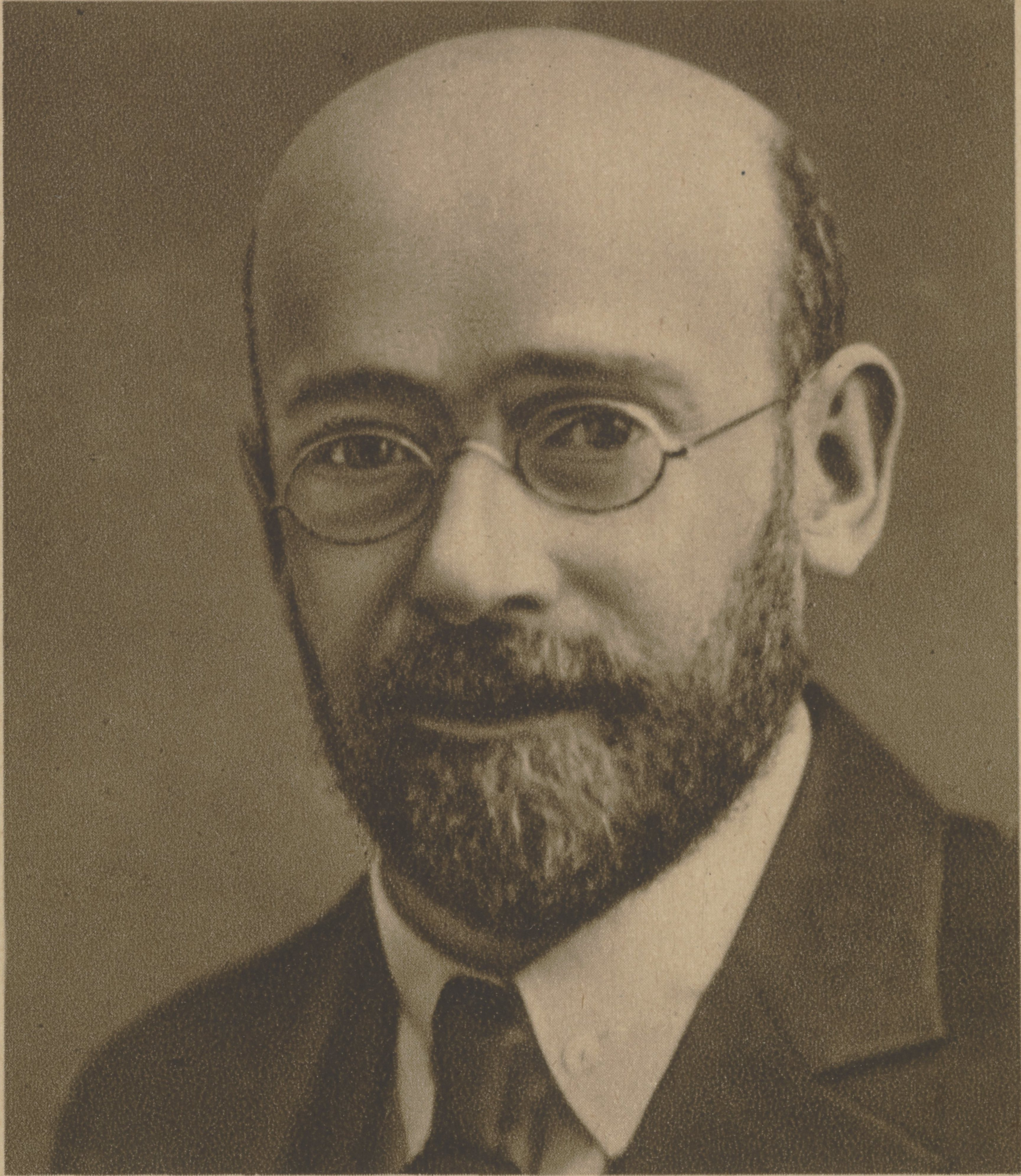
Korczak

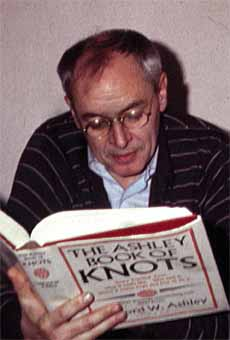
R.D. Laing

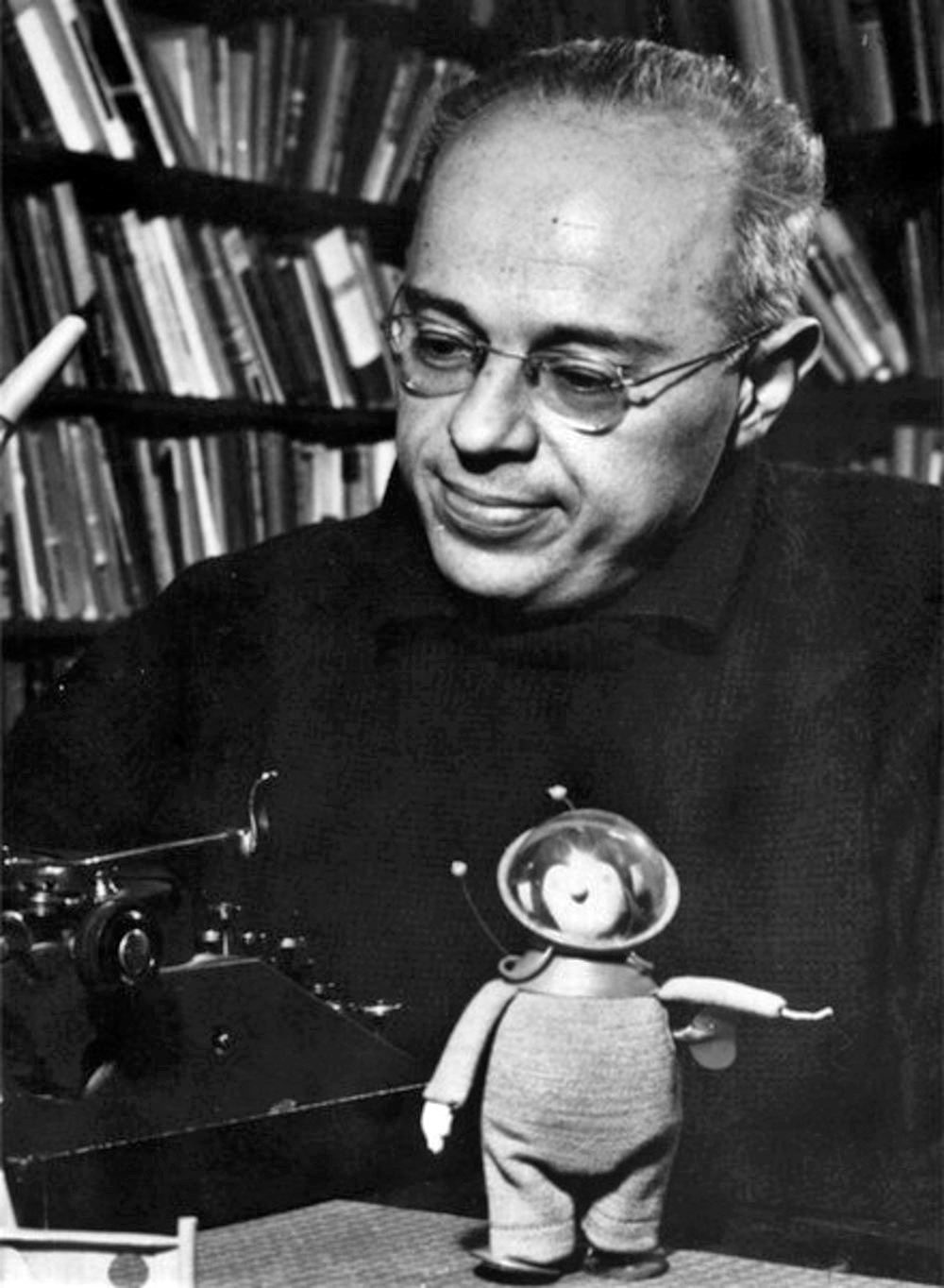
Lem

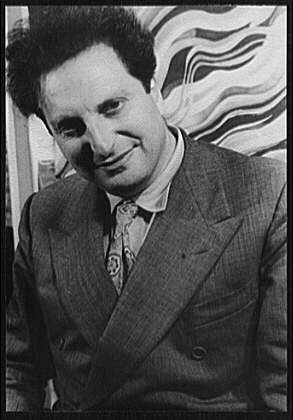
Levi

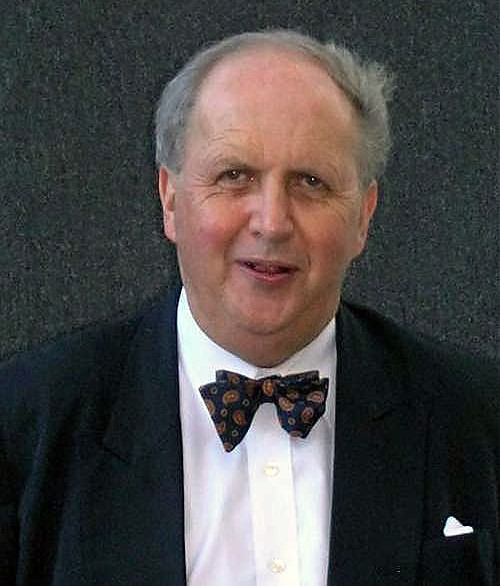
McCall Smith

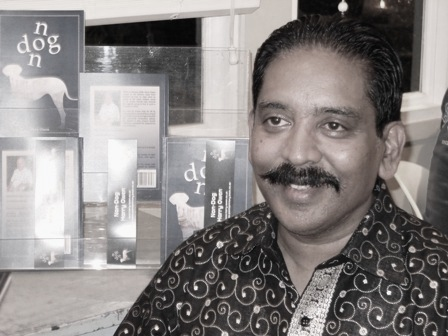
Mitra

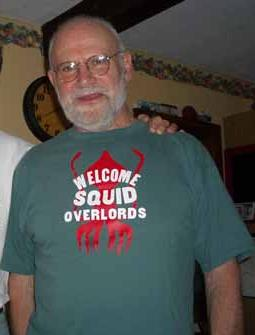
Sacks

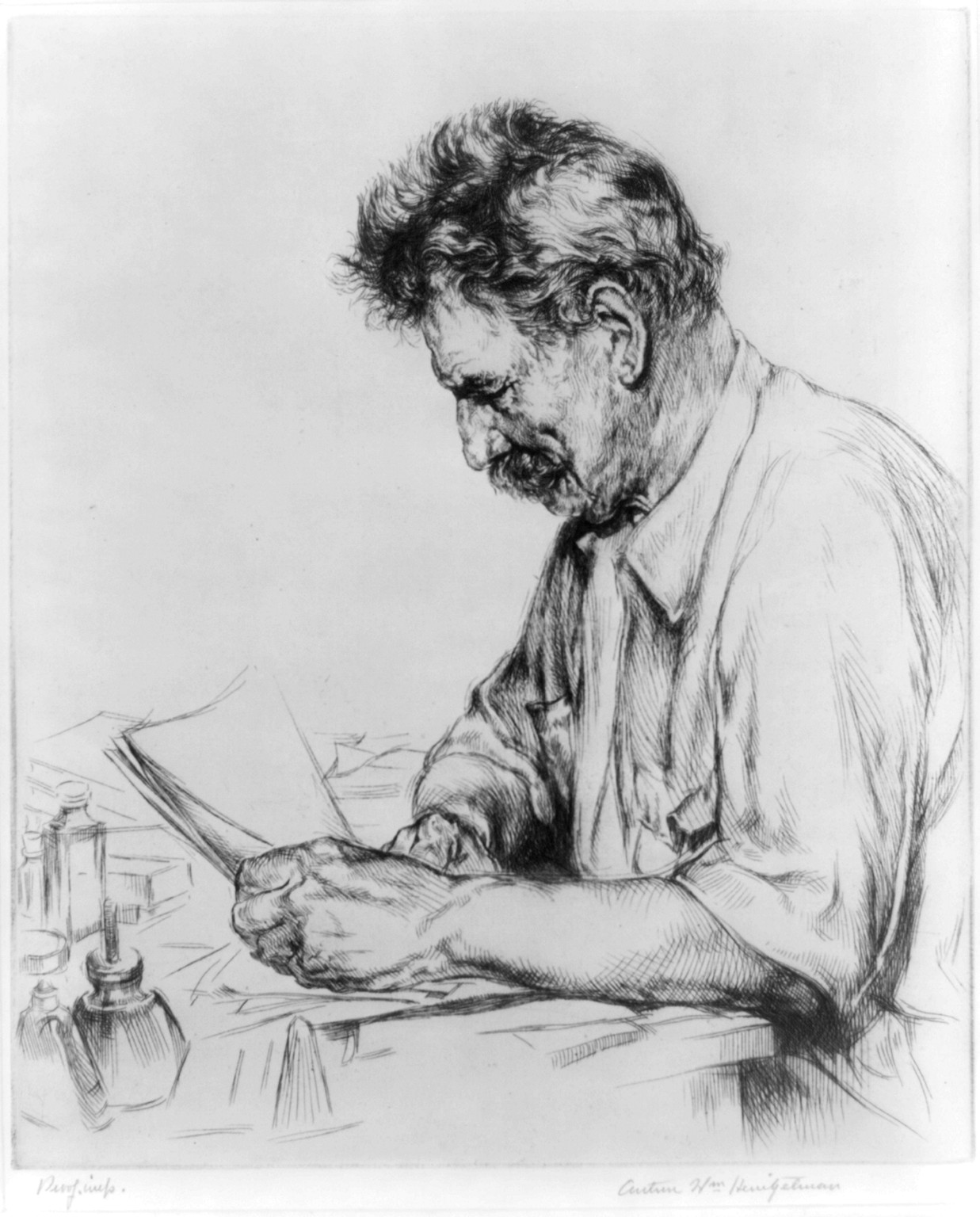
Schweitzer

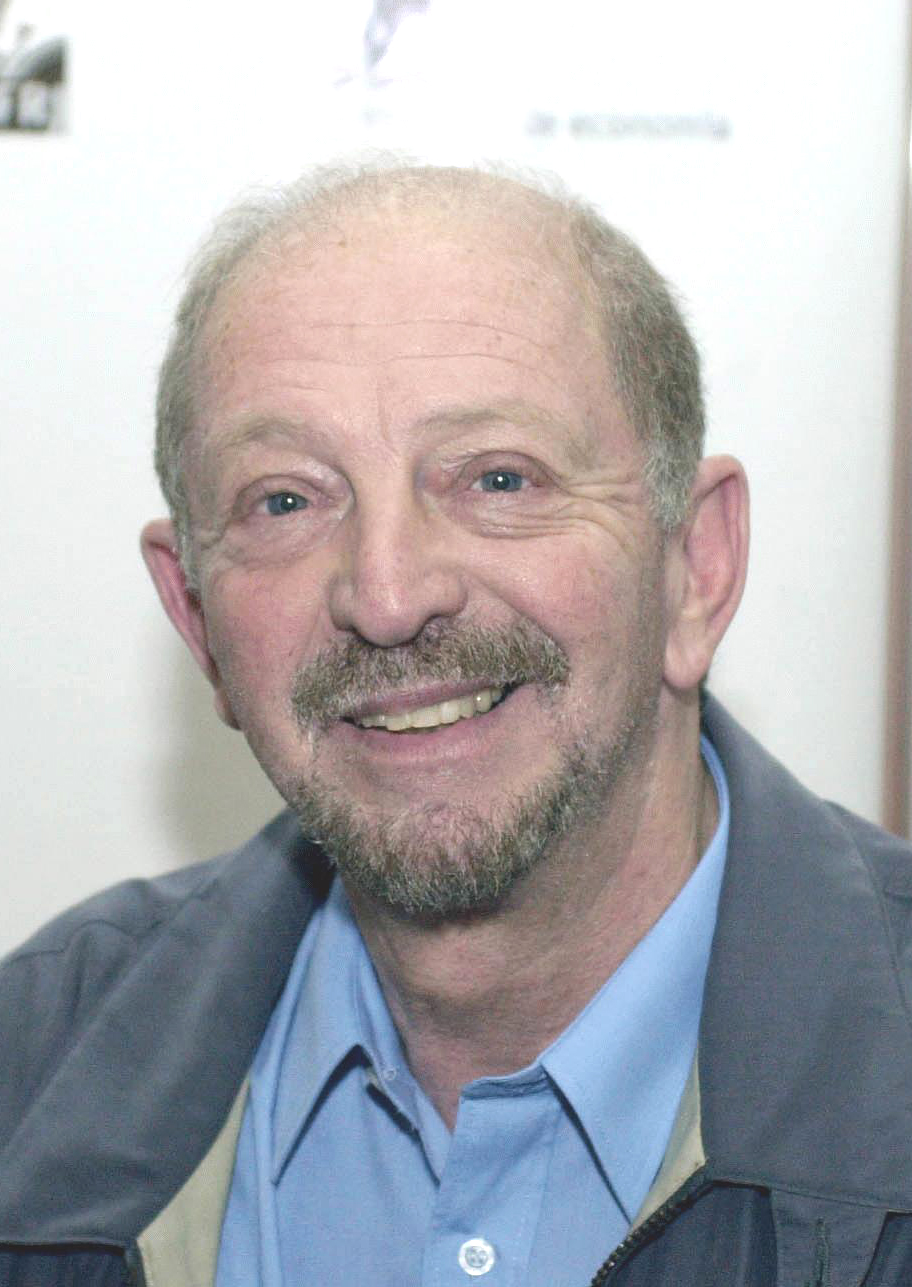
Scliar

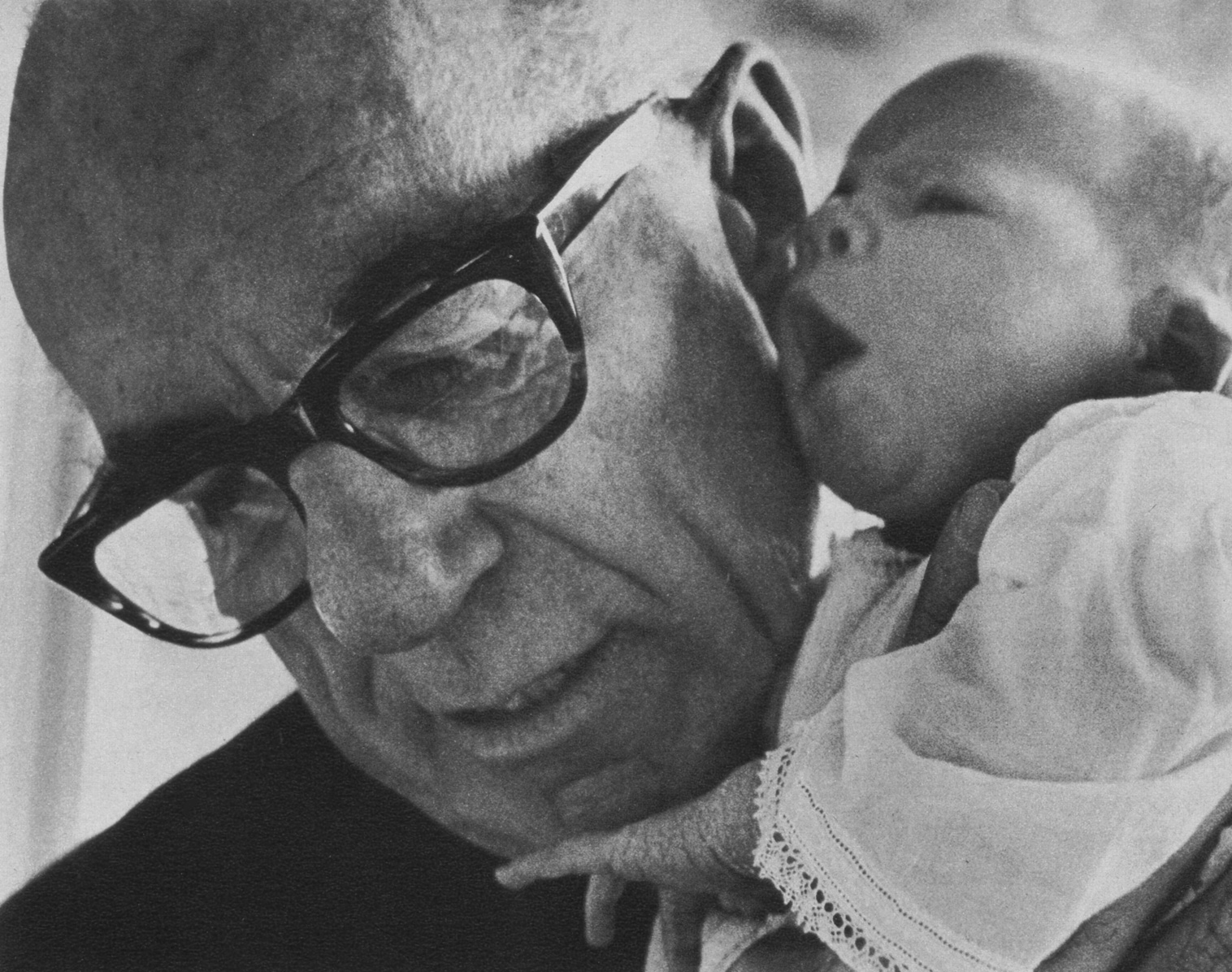
Spock

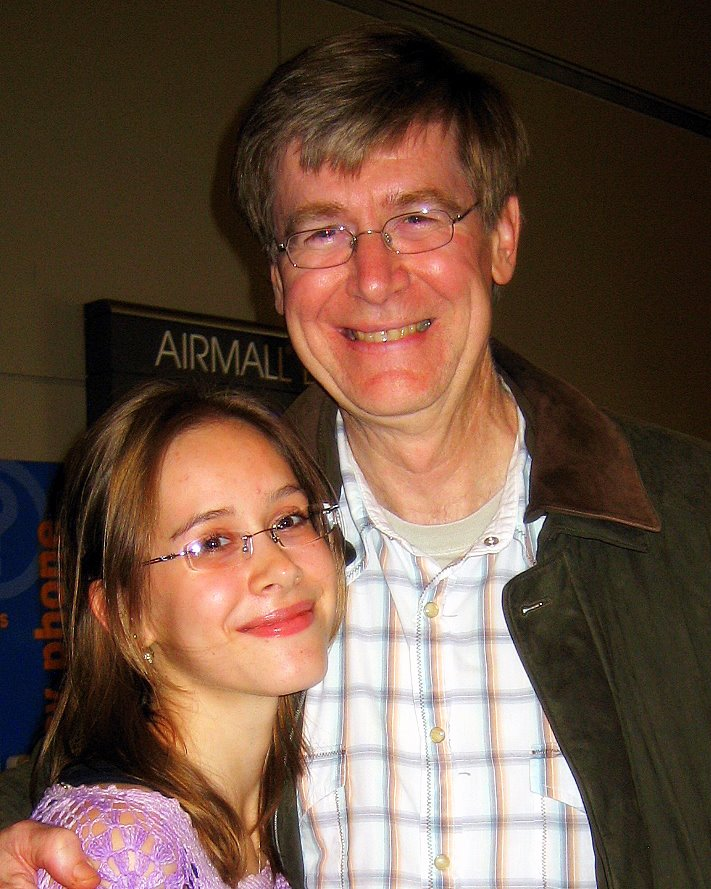
Strauss and daughter

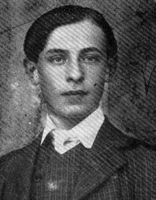
Vančura

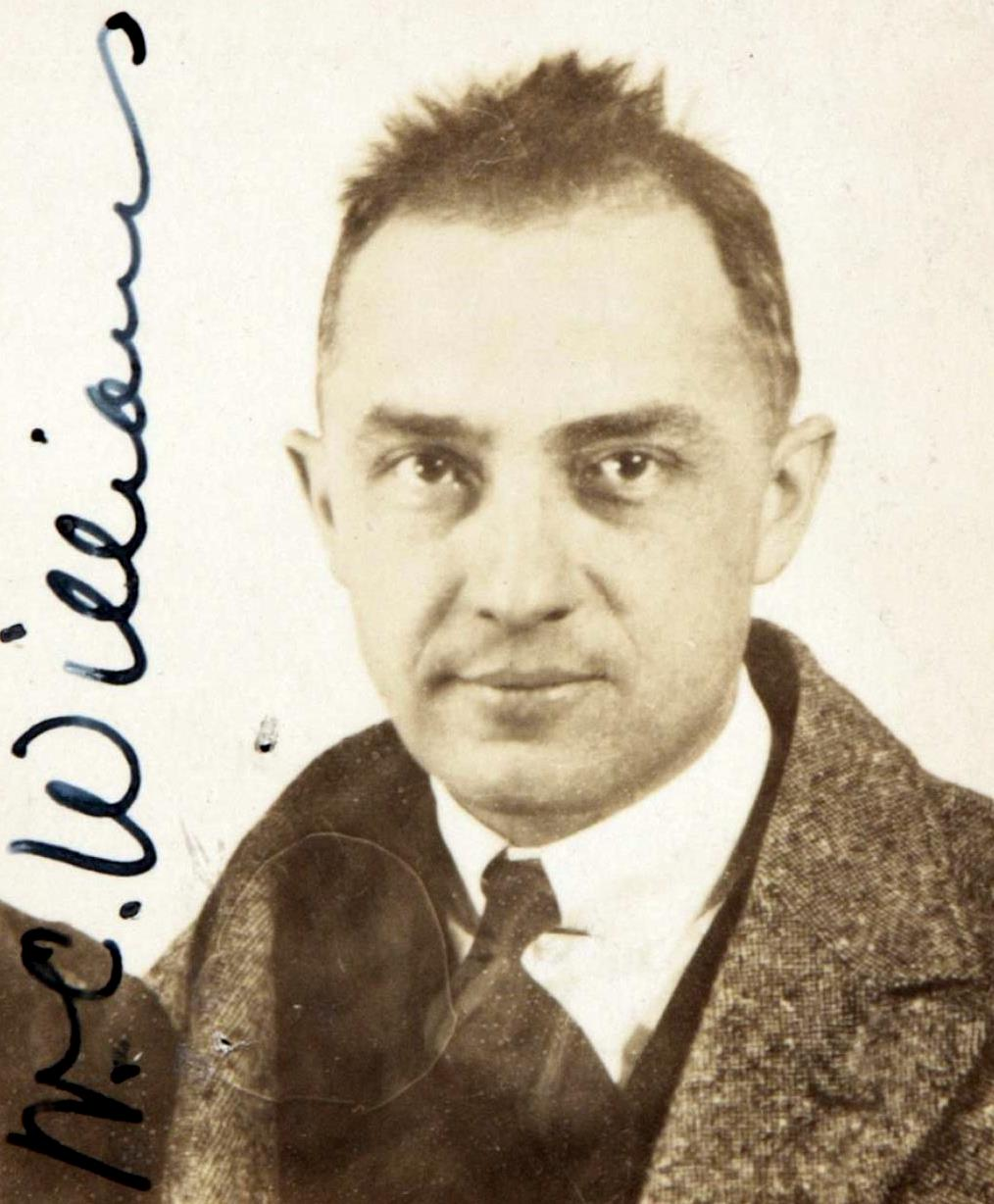
Williams

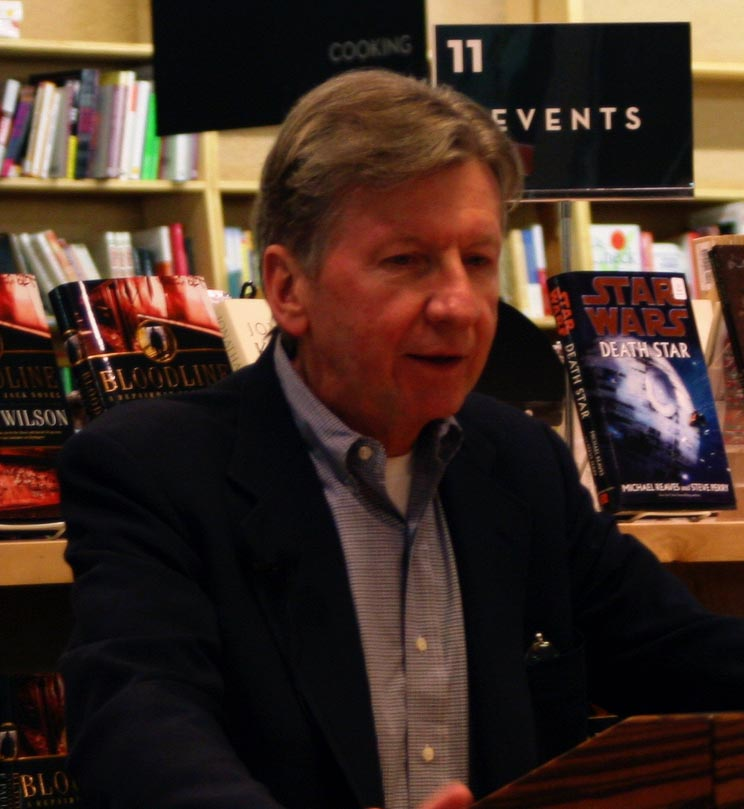
Wilson

- Kōbō Abe (1924–1993) Japanese author known for his surrealistic, Kafkaesque style
- Keith Ablow, New York Times best-selling author
- Dannie Abse (1923–2014) Welsh chest specialist who is also one of Europe's most prolific doctor-poets
- Vassily Aksyonov (1932–2009) Russian novelist who was forced to emigrate from the Soviet Union in 1980
- António Lobo Antunes (born 1942) psychiatrist and leading Portuguese writer
- Ike Anya, (born 1970) Nigerian public health physician and author of Small by Small and the essays A Banner Without Stain and People Don't Get Depressed in Nigeria (Granta)
- Jacob M. Appel (born 1973), American short story writer
- Daniel Amen, psychiatrist, New York Times author
- Janet Asimov (1926–2019, Janet Opal Jeppson) American science fiction author and psychoanalyst, wife of Isaac Asimov
- Brian Andrews (born 1955), neurosurgeon, Novelist
- Alaa Al Aswany (born 1957), Egyptian writer and practicing dentist
- Ba'al Machshavot: see Israel Isidor Elyashev
- Arnie Baker (born 1953 in Montreal, Canada) is a bicycle coach, racer and writer
- Christiaan Neethling Barnard (1922–2001) South African cardiac surgeon, famous for performing the world's first successful human-to-human heart transplant
- Martin Bax (born 1933) British founder and editor of the literary journal Ambit (1959); a developmental pediatrician and editor of the journal, Developmental and Child Neurology. He is also author of the cult novel, The Hospital Ship.
- Eric Berne (1910–70), psychiatrist who created transactional analysis; author of Games People Play.
- Tadeusz Boy-Żeleński (1874–1941) Polish gynecologist, journalist, poet, most famous as the translator of over 100 French literary classics into Polish.
- Rafael Campo (born 1964) director of the Harvard Program in the Medical Humanities; his practice serves mostly Latinos, gay/lesbian/bisexual/transgender people, and people with HIV
- Ethan Canin (born 1960) American short story writer and novelist; author of Emperor of the Air, Carry Me Across the Water, and other works
- Louis-Ferdinand Céline (Louis-Ferdinand Destouches, 1894–1961), French physician and author of Voyage au bout de la nuit
- Deepak Chopra (born 1946) Indian writer on spirituality and mind-body medicine
- Don Coldsmith (1926–2009) American author of primarily Western fiction; past president of Western Writers of America
- Robert Coles (born 1929) American author, child psychiatrist, and professor at Harvard University
- Alex Comfort (1920–2000) British writer and poet, author of The Joy of Sex and a science fiction novel, Tetrarch
- Robin Cook (born 1940), American author of best-selling novels, including Coma; nearly all his books deal with hot medical issues of the day, from bioterrorism to organ donation
- Michael Crichton (1942–2008) American author of Jurassic Park
- Harvey Cushing (1869–1939) American neurosurgeon, won Pulitzer Prize for his biography of Sir William Osler
- Theodore Dalrymple, pen name of Anthony Daniels (born 1949). Conservative writer, author of Spoilt Rotten: The Toxic Cult of Sentimentality, among others. Retired British prison doctor and psychiatrist.
- Colin Douglas (born 1945) pseudonym of a Scottish novelist, Colin Thomas Currie; frequent British Medical Journal contributor
- Halbert L. Dunn (1896–1975) authored High Level Wellness (1961).
- Marek Edelman (1922–2009) Polish sociopolitical activist, memoirist, last leader of the 1943 Warsaw Ghetto Uprising.
- Nawal El Saadawi (1931–2021) Egyptian feminist who wrote many books on the subject of women in Islam
- Israel Isidor Elyashev (1873–1924; pen-name: Ba'al Machshavot, Hebrew for "The Thinker" (בעל מחשבות): Lithuanian neurologist; pioneer of Hebrew and Yiddish literature; known as the first Yiddish literary critic, publisher, translator (translated Theodor Herzl's Altneuland from German into Yiddish) and forerunner of the Zionist Movement
- Frantz Fanon (1925–1961) born in Martinique, who wrote books on the psychology of colonial oppression, notably The Wretched of the Earth.
- Jacques Ferron (1921–85) Canadian author who founded the Parti Rhinocéros, which he described as "an intellectual guerrilla party"
- Michael Fitzwilliam, pseudonym of J. B. Lyons (1922–1997), professor of medical history at the Royal College of Surgeons of Ireland, who wrote fiction in the 1960s
- Alice Weaver Flaherty (born ) American neurologist, author of The Midnight Disease: The Drive to Write, Writer's Block, and the Creative Brain
- Viktor Frankl (1905–1997) Austrian neurologist and psychiatrist, author of Man's Search for Meaning
- Sigmund Freud (1856–1939), Austrian psychoanalyst, author of many books prized as much for their literary qualities.
- Graeme Garden (born 1943) British comedy writer and performer from Scotland, actor, television director, and author, he became well known as a member of The Goodies comedy trio; author of a novel The Seventh Man
- Tess Gerritsen (born 1953) American writer of gothic thrillers with a medical theme
- Peter Goldsworthy (1951) Australian writer who has won many awards for his short stories, poetry, novels, and opera libretti
- Richard Gordon, pen name of Gordon Ostlere (1921–2017) English author of novels, screenplays for film and television and accounts of popular history; most famous for comic novels on a medical theme starting with Doctor in the House, and their film, television and stage adaptations; The Alarming History of Medicine was published in 1993 followed by The Alarming History of Sex
- John Grant (born 1933) English author who writes under the pen name Jonathan Gash. He is the author of the Lovejoy series of novels
- Jerome Groopman
- Lars Johan Wictor Gyllensten (1921–2006) Swedish author and physician, and a member of the Swedish Academy
- Miroslav Holub (1923–1998) Czech poet, heavily influenced by his experiences as an immunologist, wrote many poems using his scientific knowledge to poetic effect
- Richard Hooker (1924–1997) American writer and surgeon who wrote under the pseudonym Richard Hooker. His most famous work was MASH (1968)
- Khaled Hosseini (born 1965) Afghanistan-born American novelist; author of the bestsellers The Kite Runner and A Thousand Splendid Suns
- Wil Huygen (1923–2009) Dutch author and painter, best known for the picture books on gnomes
- Yusuf Idris, also Yusif Idris (1927–91) Egyptian writer of plays, short stories, and novels who wrote realistic stories about ordinary and poor people. Many of his works are in the Egyptian vernacular, and he was considered a master of the short story
- P. C. Jersild (born 1935) Swedish writer, best known for Barnens ö (The Island of the Children) filmed in 1980 by Kay Pollak
- Alice Jones, American poet, practiced internal medicine, psychiatry, now psychoanalysis. Co-editor of Apogee Press.
- Carl Jung (1875–1961), Austrian psychoanalyst and author.
- James Kahn (born 1947), American writer, best known for his novelization of Return of the Jedi, Poltergeist and Indiana Jones and the Temple of Doom. He has also written for well-known television series such as Melrose Place, Star Trek: The Next Generation, St. Elsewhere and E/R
- Adam Kay, (born 1980), British TV writer, author, comedian, and former physician; author of best-seller This Is Going to Hurt (2017)
- Harold L. Klawans (1937–98), professor of neurology and pharmacology, author of nonfiction and fiction works; wrote Chekhov's Lie, about the challenges of combining a medical career with writing
- Bernard Knight, CBE (born 1931) has written about thirty books, including contemporary crime fiction, historical novels about Wales, biography, non-fiction popular works on forensic medicine, twelve medico-legal textbooks and the current highly acclaimed Crowner John Mysteries series of 12th-century historical mysteries
- Ronald David Laing (1927–89) Scottish psychiatrist who wrote extensively on mental illness and particularly the experience of psychosis
- Stanisław Lem (1921–2006) Polish science fiction, philosophical and satirical writer whose books have been translated into 41 languages and have sold over 27 million copies
- Carlo Levi (1902–1975) Italian non practising physician, active anti-fascist, painter, novelist, essayist, author of the influential novel Christ Stopped at Eboli
- Robert Jay Lifton (1926–2025) psychiatrist and author, chiefly known for his studies of the psychological causes and effects of wars and political violence
- Edward Lowbury (1913–2007) English bacteriologist and pathologist who was also a published poet and wrote criticism and biography
- John E. Mack (1929–2004) Pulitzer Prize-winning biographer, also considered an authority on the spiritual or transformational effects of alleged alien-encounter experiences
- Adeline Yen Mah (born 1937) Chinese-American author
- J. Nozipo Maraire (born 1966) Zimbabwean writer; author of Zenzele: A Letter for My Daughter
- Félix Martí Ibáñez (1912–1972) Spanish author and minister for the Republic during the Spanish Civil War; exiled during Franco's era, he became a United States citizen and published the popular MD magazine in 1950s
- Alexander McCall Smith, CBE, FRSE, (born 1948) Rhodesian-born Scottish writer and emeritus Professor of Medical Law at the University of Edinburgh, Scotland; writer of fiction, most widely known as the creator of The No. 1 Ladies' Detective Agency Series
- Jed Mercurio (born 1966) British writer who also writes under the name John MacUre; created the television series Cardiac Arrest and Bodies; has also written and directed for The Grimleys
- Sir Jonathan Wolfe Miller, CBE (1934–2019) British theatre and opera director, author, television presenter, humorist and sculptor
- Amitabh Mitra (born 1955) South African poet of Indian origin, working at Cecilia Makiwane Hospital in Mdantsane township
- Merrill Moore (1903–57) contributor to The Fugitive, became a member of the great literary circle that started the "modern Southern literature," the Southern Agrarian Movement; most prolific sonneteer ever, he wrote over forty thousand sonnets
- Fernando Goncalves Namora (1919–1989) was a Portuguese writer and medical doctor.
- Taslima Nasrin (also spelled Taslima Nasreen and popularly referred to as 'Taslima', born 1962) Bengali Bangladeshi author and feminist who writes about the treatment of women in Islam; lives in exile in India and has received death threats from fundamentalists
- Josef Nesvadba (1926–2005) Czech science fiction writer, the best known from the 1960s generation; pioneer of group psychotherapy in Czechoslovakia
- António Agostinho Neto (1922–79), first President of Angola (1975–1979), leader of the Popular Movement for the Liberation of Angola (MPLA) and celebrated poet
- Abioseh Nicol (Davidson Nicol) (1924–94) Sierra Leonean academic, diplomat, writer and poet
- Alan E. Nourse (1928–1992) American science fiction author
- Sherwin Nuland (1930–2014) American author who taught bioethics and medicine at the Yale University School of Medicine
- Danielle Ofri Author of What Doctors Feel; Incidental Findings; Medicine in Translation; What Patients Say, What Doctors Hear; When We Do Harm, and Singular Intimacies: Becoming a Doctor at Bellevue. Internist at Bellevue Hospital and Professor of Medicine at NYU School of Medicine. Editor-in-chief of Bellevue Literary Review.
- Ferdie Pacheco (1927–2017) prolific author and painter, nicknamed "The Fight Doctor"; personal physician of Muhammad Ali
- Michael Stephen Palmer (1942–2013) author of 13 novels, often called the Medical thrillers series
- Miodrag Pavlović (1928–1914) Serbian writer and physician.
- M. Scott Peck (1936–2005), American psychiatrist whose The Road Less Traveled sold more than seven million copies and was on The New York Times best-seller list for over six years
- Walker Percy (1916–1990) American Southern author whose interests included philosophy and semiotics
- Lenrie Leopold Wilfred Peters (1932–2009) Gambian novelist and poet
- Steve Pieczenik (born 1943) is author of psycho-political thrillers and the co-creator of the best-selling Tom Clancy's Op-Center and Tom Clancy's Net Force paperback series
- Michael Polanyi (1891–1976) Hungarian-British philosopher of science, economist, trained as a physician
- Stephen Potts (born 1957) British author of children's books
- Vladan Radoman (1936–2015) Serbian writer and anesthetist.
- Wilhelm Reich (1897–1957), Austrian-American psychiatrist, author of The Mass Psychology of Fascism and Character Analysis.
- Mickey Zucker Reichert (born 1962) Pediatrician and fantasy author
- Theodore Isaac Rubin (1923–2019) iconoclastic psychiatrist, wrote more than twenty-five works of fiction and nonfiction; his David and Lisa was made into an acclaimed film in 1962
- Suhayl Saadi (born 1961) is an author and dramatist based in Glasgow
- Oliver Wolf Sacks (1933–2015) wrote popular books about his patients (e.g. The Man Who Mistook his Wife for a Hat), the most famous of which is Awakenings, which was adapted into a film starring Robin Williams and Robert De Niro
- Gholam-Hossein Sa'edi (15 January 1936 in Tabriz – 23 November 1985 in Paris), Iranian physician (psychiatrist) and writer
- Ferrol Sams (1922–2013) American novelist; author of Run with the Horsemen, who draws heavily on southern storytelling tradition
- Moacyr Scliar (1937–2011) Jewish-Brazilian writer; most of his writing centers on issues of Jewish identity in the Diaspora and particularly on being Jewish in Brazil
- Richard Selzer (1928–2016) American author of such celebrated works as Mortal Lessons, Confessions of a Knife, Letters to a Young Doctor and Taking the World in for Repairs which blur the line between case reporting and fiction
- Samuel Shem, pen-name Stephen Joseph Bergman (born 1944) wrote The House of God and Mount Misery, both fictional but close-to-real first-hand descriptions of the training of doctors
- David Shrayer-Petrov (born 1936) Russian-American fiction writer, poet, and essayist, best known for his Russian trilogy of novels about Jewish refuseniks and for his collections of short stories Jonah and Sarah, Autumn in Yalta and Dinner with Stalin, all of which feature medical themes and characters who are doctors and nurses. He served as a military physician in the Soviet Union, practiced as an endocrinologist, worked as a research microbiologist and oncologist.
- Frank Slaughter, pseudonym C.V. Terry (1908–2001) American bestselling novelist whose themes include history, the Biblical world, new findings in medical research and technology; wrote Doctors' Wives
- Benjamin Spock (1903–1988) – American pediatrician, wrote Baby and Child Care
- Ken Strauss (born 1953) novelist who helps promote the work of other physician writers
- Han Suyin (pen name of Elizabeth Comber, born Rosalie Elisabeth; 1917–2012), Chinese-born author of several books on modern China, novels set in East Asia, and autobiographical works. She long resided in Lausanne and wrote in English and French.
- Raymond Tallis (born 1946) British author has published a novel, three volumes of poetry and over a dozen books on philosophy, literary theory, art and cultural criticism; in 2004 he was identified in Prospect magazine as one of the top 100 public intellectuals in the United Kingdom; wrote The Enduring Significance of Parmenides: Unthinkable Thought
- Lewis Thomas (1913–1993) celebrated American essayist and poet
- Mario Tobino (1910–1991) Italian psychiatrist, poet, writer of several novels about his war experiences and his professional encounters with mental suffering and social dislocation.
- Leonid Tsypkin (1926–1982) Jewish-Russian writer born in Minsk, best known for his book Summer in Baden-Baden
- Gael Turnbull (1928–2004) Scottish poet who was an important precursor of the British Poetry Revival
- Vaino Vahing (1940–2008) former psychiatrist, one of the most famous and gifted of Estonian writers; most of his publications date from the 1970s and '80s.
- Abraham Verghese (born 1955) Indian-American professor at Stanford University Medical School, born and reared in Ethiopia, author of the novel, Cutting for Stone.
- Karl Edward Wagner (1945–1994) American writer, editor and publisher of horror, science fiction, and heroic fantasy
- Junichi Watanabe (1933–2014) Japanese novelist who was an orthopaedic surgeon, published romantic story A Lost Paradise.
- Phil Whitaker (born 1966) book reviewer for the New Statesman and a novelist
- James White (1928–1999) wrote the Sector General Series about a hospital in space, but was not a physician. He wanted to be one, but "he had to go out and work" (see article in Wikipedia and author's web site.)
- William Carlos Williams (1883–1963) was an American poet closely associated with modernism and Imagism. He was also a pediatrician and GP.
- Tim Willocks (born 1957) British novelist whose work usually features a central character with extensive medical knowledge (especially of drugs) and martial arts ability (Willocks is a black belt in Shotokan karate)
- F. Paul Wilson (born 1946) writes novels and short stories primarily in the science fiction and horror genres
- Irvin Yalom (born 1931) existentialist and psychotherapist; produced a number of novels and also experimented with writing techniques; in Everyday Gets a Little Closer he invited a patient to co-write about the experience of therapy
- C. Dale Young (born 1969) American poet, editor and educator; edits poetry for New England Review.

== 21st century ==
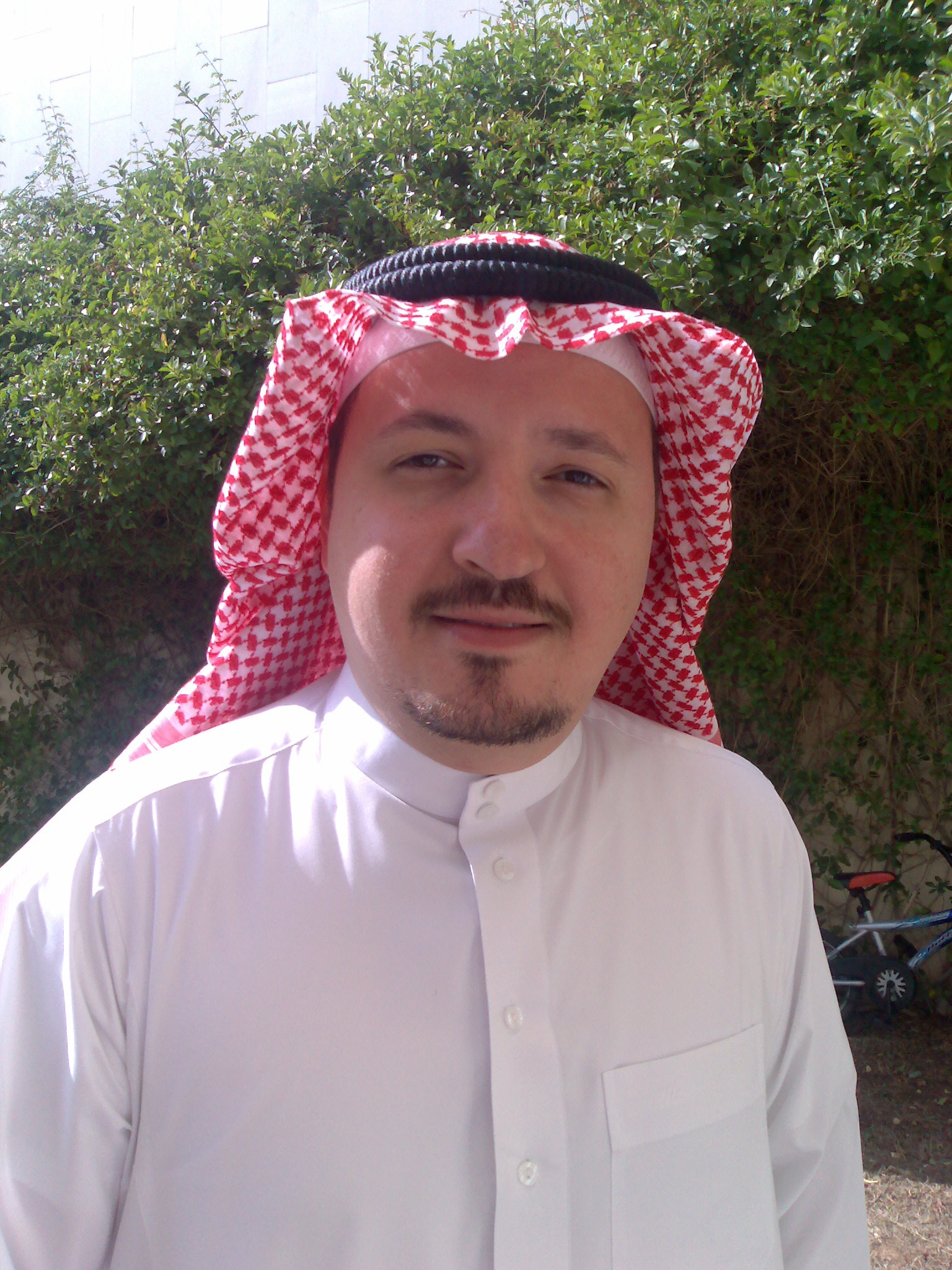
Alkabbani

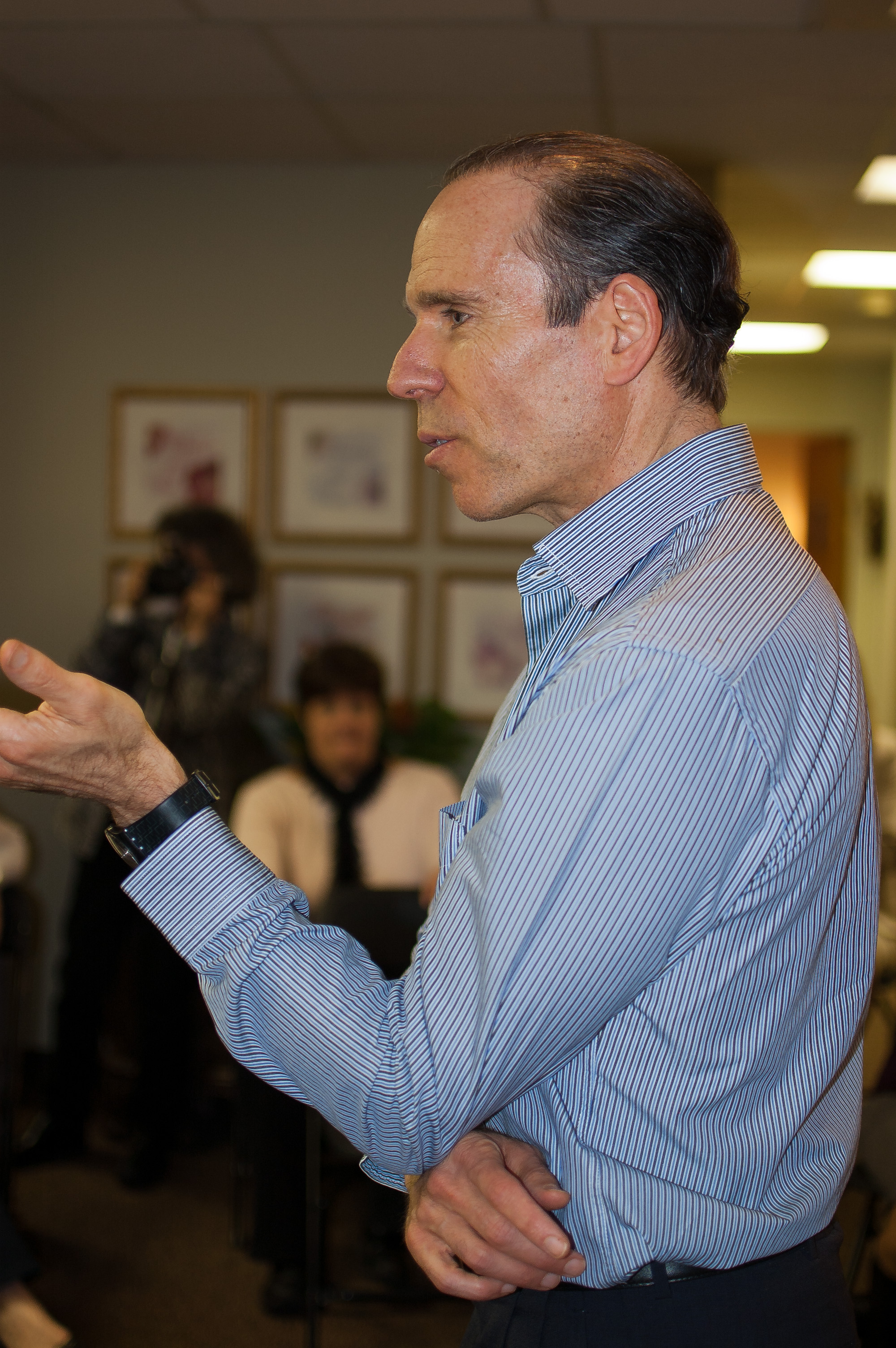
Fuhrman

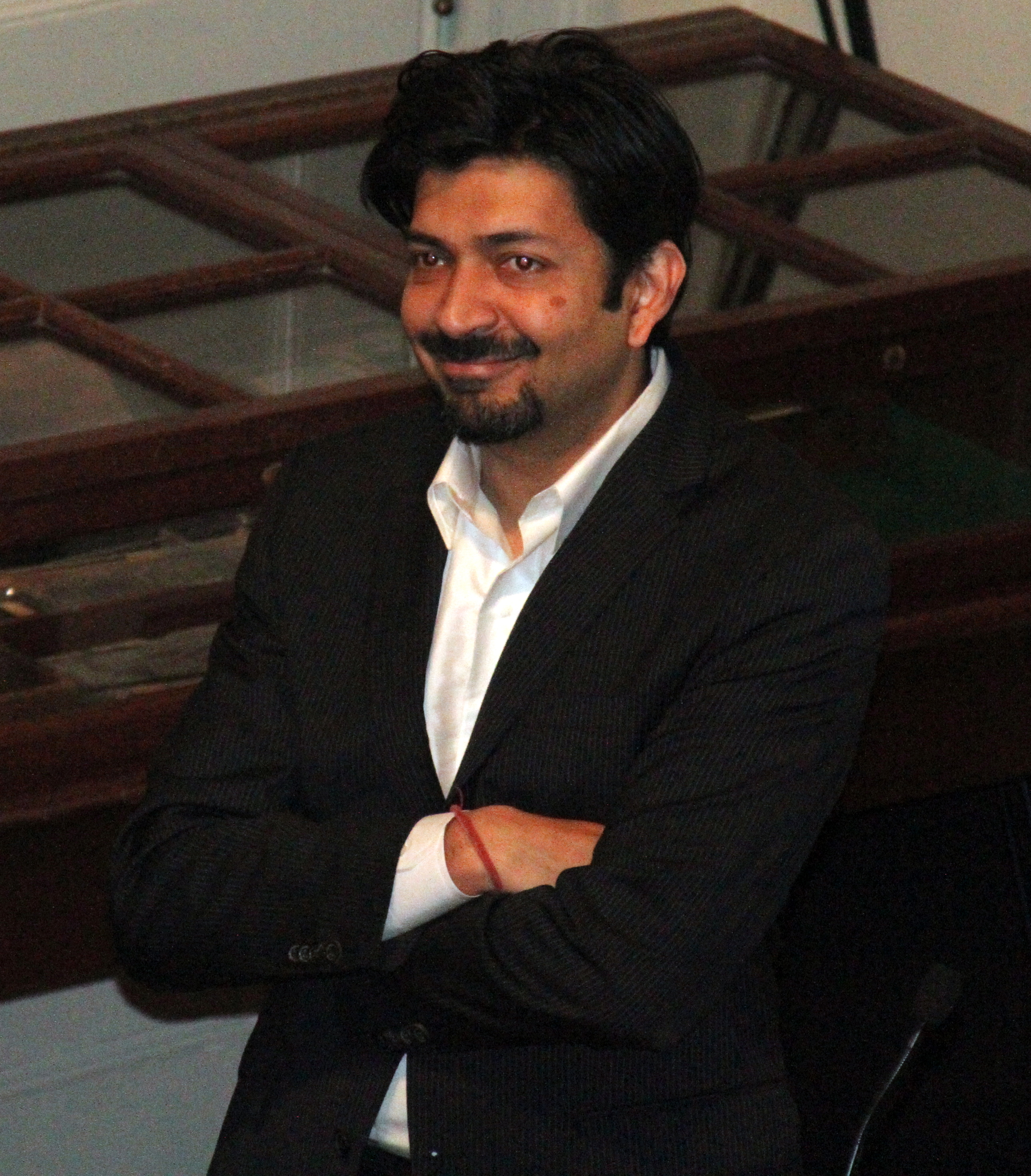
Mukherjee

- Chris Adrian, author, paediatrician, Harvard Divinity School graduate
- Monther Alkabbani (born 1970), celebrated Saudi Arabian writer, novelist and surgeon
- Janet Asimov, psychiatrist, psychoanalyst, and science fiction writer
- Gyan Chaturvedi (born 1952), Indian cardiologist, author, and columnist. He is a prolific writer of much-acclaimed satire in Hindi.
- Daria Chubata, Ukrainian physician, author, poet, social activist
- Brandon Colby, writer on predictive medicine and genetic testing
- John Collee, Scottish physician, novelist and screenwriter (Master and Commander, Happy Feet)
- Ion Degen, Soviet and Israeli writer, doctor and medical scientist in the field of orthopedics and traumatology
- Joel Fuhrman, family physician, author, print and TV advocate of a micronutrient-rich diet
- Rivka Galchen, novelist
- Atul Gawande (born 1965), general and endocrine surgeon at Brigham and Women's Hospital in Boston, Massachusetts, and The New Yorker medical writer
- Tess Gerritsen, novelist
- Alex Jadad, Canadian-Colombian physician, professor and philosopher, author of Unlearning: Incomplete Musings about the Game of Life and the Illusions that Keep Us Playing, and The Feast of our Life
- Paul Kalanithi, neurosurgeon and author of When Breath Becomes Air
- Perri Klass, journalist, pediatrician, New York University professor
- Vincent Lam, Canadian writer (Bloodletting & Miraculous Cures)
- Timothy Leo, poet, physician, author of The Dog's Letter
- Asael Lubotzky, Israeli pediatrician, writer, and scientist
- C. J. Lyons, former pediatrician and thriller writer
- Amit Majmudar, poet, novelist, practicing radiologist, 1st Ohio poet laureate
- Howard Markel, physician, medical historian, journalist, editor, national best selling author, and professor at The University of Michigan
- Siddhartha Mukherjee, oncologist, Pulitzer Prize winner, author of The Emperor of All Maladies: A Biography of Cancer
- Taslima Nasrin, Bengali author and former physician
- Danielle Ofri, internist at Bellevue Hospital and professor of medicine at New York University School of Medicine. Editor of Bellevue Literary Review. Author of What Doctors Feel; Incidental Findings; Medicine in Translation; What Patients Say, What Doctors Hear; When We Do Harm, and Singular Intimacies: Becoming a Doctor at Bellevue.
- Kevin Patterson, Canadian writer
- Nawal El Saadawi, Egyptian feminist writer, activist, physician and psychiatrist
- Abraham Verghese, Indian-American New York Times Bestselling author, Professor at Stanford University Medical School, Department of Internal Medicine
- Kyrie Wang, historical fantasy author, practicing pathologist, artist, assistant professor at McGill University, Department of Pathology.
- Martin Winckler, physician, writer, TV critic
- João Guimarães Rosa (1908 – 1967)Brazilian novelist, short story writer, poet and diplomat.
- Augusto Cury (1958-) Brazilian physician, psychiatrist, psychotherapist and writer.
- Antônio Drauzio Varella (1943-)Brazilian doctor, educator, scientist and medical science popularizer in the press and TV, as well as best-selling author.
- Vaishnavi Pusapati, physician, poet and writer.

== Worldwide organizations ==
In 1955 a group of physician-writers created the International Federation of Societies of Physician-Writers (FISEM). One of the founders was Dr. André Soubiran, author of Hommes en blanc (The Doctors). Other founders included Italian Professors Nasi and Lombroso, Belgian Drs. Sévery and Thiriet, Swiss physicians Junod and René Kaech, and eminent French writers of the medical academy. Dr. Mirko Skoficz was a key figure at the first FISEM congress in San Remo, Italy, along with his wife, Italian film star Gina Lollobrigida.

In 1973 FISEM changed its name to UMEM—Union Mondiale des Écrivains Médécins, or World Union of Physician Writers. Its current president is Dr. Carlos Vieira Reis of Portugal. UMEM is an umbrella organization that subsumes physician-writer groups in:

- Belgium, Groupement Belge des Médecins-Écrivains
- Brazil, Sociedade Brasileira de Médicos Escritores SOBRAMES
- Bulgaria, Club des Écrivains Médecins en Bulgarie
- France, Groupement des Ecrivains – Médecins [GEM]
- Germany, Bundesverband Deutscher Schriftstellerärzte [BDSA]
- Greece, Hellenic Society of Physician Writers
- Italy, A.M.S.I.
- Netherlands, Penaescula
- Poland, Unia Polskich Pisarzy Medyków [UPPL]
- Portugal, Sociedade Portuguesa dos Escritores Médicos [SOPEAM]
- Romania, Societaea Medicilor Scriitori şi Publicişti din România
- South America, Liga Sud-Americana de Médicos-Escritores LISAME
- Spain, Asociación Española de Médicos Escritores e Artistas [AEMEA]
- Switzerland, Association Suisse des Écrivains Médecins [ASEM]

== See also ==
- Lists of writers
- Writers by non-fiction subject area (category)
