= List of San Francisco Bay Area writers =

This is a list of San Francisco Bay Area writers, notable writers who have lived in, or written about, the San Francisco Bay Area.

== A ==
- Chester Aaron (May 9, 1923 – August 30, 2019), An American Ghost
- Scott Adams (June 8, 1957 – January 13, 2026), Dilbert
- Kim Addonizio (July 31, 1954 – ), My Dreams Out in the Street
- Laura Albert (November 2, 1965 – ), The Heart Is Deceitful Above All Things
- David M. Alexander (1945 – ), My Real Name Is Lisa
- Isabel Allende (August 2, 1942 – ), The House of the Spirits
- Dorothy Allison (April 11, 1949 – ), Bastard out of Carolina
- Charlie Jane Anders, Six Months, Three Days
- Brent Anderson (June 15, 1955 – ), Astro City series
- Robert Mailer Anderson, Boonville, The Adventures of Teddy Ballgame, Windows on the World
- Sarah Andrews, An Eye For Gold
- Maya Angelou (April 4, 1928 – May 28, 2014), I Know Why the Caged Bird Sings
- Tamim Ansary (November 4, 1948 – ), West of Kabul, East of New York
- Mary Therese Austin (d. 1889), theater critic, The Argonaut

== B ==
- Natalie Baszile, Queen Sugar
- Peter S. Beagle (April 20, 1939 – ), The Last Unicorn
- John Bear (1938 – ), Bears' Guide to Earning Degrees by Distance Learning
- Dodie Bellamy, Pink Steam
- Hester A. Benedict (1838–1921), president, Pacific Coast Women's Press Association
- Ambrose Bierce (1842–1914?)
- Terry Bisson (February 12, 1942 – January 10, 2024), "They're Made Out of Meat"
- Vance Bourjaily (September 17, 1922 – August 31, 2010), Brill Among the Ruins
- Steven R. Boyett, Elegy Beach
- Kate Braverman (February 5, 1949 – October 12, 2019), "Squandering the Blue"
- Gray Brechin (September 2, 1947 – ), "Imperial San Francisco: Urban Power, Earthly Ruin"
- Genea Brice, poet laureate of Vallejo, California
- Luther Burbank (March 7, 1849 – April 11, 1926), How Plants are Trained to Work for Man

== C ==
- Patrick Califia (1954 – ), Speaking Sex to Power
- Ethan Canin (July 19, 1960 – ), For Kings and Planets
- Gail Carriger (May 4, 1976 – ), Soulless
- Michael Chabon (May 24, 1963 – ), The Amazing Adventures of Kavalier & Clay
- Belo Cipriani (June 21, 1980 – ), Blind: A Memoir
- Meg Waite Clayton (January 1, 1959 – ), The Last Train to London, The Race for Paris, The Wednesday Sisters
- Mark Coggins (1957 – ) August Riordan novels
- Ann Weiser Cornell (1949 – ), The Power of Focusing
- Andy Couturier (June 3, 1964 – ), The Abundance of Less

== D ==
- Avram Davidson (April 23, 1923 – May 8, 1993), The Scarlet Fig
- Kyra Davis, Sex, Murder and a Double Latte
- Tiffanie DeBartolo (November 27, 1970 – ), How To Kill a Rock Star, Dream for an Insomniac
- Alonzo Delano (July 2, 1806 – September 8, 1874), On the Trail to the California Gold Rush
- Diane di Prima (August 6, 1934 – October 25, 2020), Loba
- N. A. Diaman (November 1, 1936 – November 8, 2020), Castro Street Memories
- Philip K. Dick (December 16, 1928 – March 2, 1982), Do Androids Dream of Electric Sheep?
- Greg Downs (November 22, 1971 – ), Spit Baths
- Howard Dully (November 30, 1948 – ), My Lobotomy
- Robert Duncan (January 7, 1919 – February 3, 1988), The Opening of the Field, Bending the Bow

== E ==
- Dossie Easton (February 26, 1944 – ), The Ethical Slut
- Dave Eggers (March 12, 1970 – ), A Heartbreaking Work of Staggering Genius, You Shall Know Our Velocity
- Duane Elgin (1943 – ), Voluntary Simplicity
- Stephen Elliott (December 3, 1971 – ), Happy Baby

== F ==
- Lawrence Ferlinghetti (March 24, 1919 – February 22, 2021), A Coney Island of the Mind
- Timothy Ferris (August 29, 1944 – ), The Whole Shebang: A State-of-the-Universe(s) Report
- Karen Joy Fowler (February 7, 1950 – ), The Jane Austen Book Club
- Soma Mei Sheng Frazier
- Robert Frost (March 26, 1874 – January 29, 1963), "Stopping by Woods on a Snowy Evening"

== G ==
- Michelle Gagnon (July 4, 1971 – ), Don't Turn Around
- Cristina Garcia, Dreaming in Cuban; The Aguero Sisters; King of Cuba
- Erle Stanley Gardner (July 17, 1889 – March 11, 1970), Perry Mason novels
- Eric Garris (December 1953 – )
- Allen Ginsberg (June 3, 1926 – April 5, 1997), "Howl"
- Robert Gluck (February 2, 1947 –), Jack the Modernist, Margery Kempe
- Herbert Gold (March 9, 1924 – November 19, 2023), Birth of a Hero
- Lisa Goldstein (November 21, 1953 – ), The Red Magician
- Joe Gores (December 25, 1931 – January 10, 2011) Dan Kearney and Associates novels
- Daphne Gottlieb (1968 – ), Final Girl
- Judy Grahn (July 28, 1940 – ), A Woman Is Talking to Death
- Andrew Sean Greer (November 21, 1970 – ), Less
- Susan Griffin (January 26, 1943 – ), Woman and Nature: the Roaring Inside Her

== H ==
- Katie Hafner (1957 – ), A Romance on Three Legs
- Dashiell Hammett (1894 – 1961)
- Daniel Handler (February 28, 1970 – ), A Series of Unfortunate Events
- Jean Hegland (1956 – ), Into the Forest
- John L. Hennessy (1953 – ), Computer Organization and Design
- Dorothy J. Heydt, A Point of Honor
- Jack Hirschman (1933 – 2021)
- Jane Hirshfield (February 24, 1953 – ), The Ink Dark Moon
- Adam Hochschild (1942 – ), King Leopold's Ghost
- Khaled Hosseini (March 4, 1965 – ), The Kite Runner
- Daedalus Howell (July 19, 1972 – ), The Late Projectionist

== J ==
- Shirley Jackson (1916 – 1965)

== K ==
- Richard Kadrey (1957 – ), From Myst to Riven
- Alan Kaufman, Jew Boy
- Jack Kerouac (March 12, 1922 – October 21, 1969), On the Road
- Laleh Khadivi, The Walking; The Age of Orphans
- Derek Kirk Kim (1974 – ), Same Difference and Other Stories
- Carla King (1958 – ), American Borders, Stories from Elsewhere
- Laurie R. King (September 19, 1952 – ), The Beekeeper's Apprentice
- Maxine Hong Kingston (October 27, 1940 – ), The Woman Warrior
- Ellen Klages (1954 – ), "Basement Magic"

== L ==
- Howard Lachtman (July 8, 1941 – ), American academic, literary critic, editor and author
- Anne Lamott (April 10, 1954 – ), Hard Laughter
- D.L. Lang, poet laureate of Vallejo, California
- Ursula K. Le Guin (October 21, 1929 – January 22, 2018), The Dispossessed
- Michael Lederer (July 9, 1956 – ), Cadaqués
- Gus Lee (1946 – )
- Fritz Reuter Leiber, Jr. (1910 – 1992)
- Donna Levin (September 4, 1954 –), The Talking Stick
- Daniel Levitin (1957 – ), This Is Your Brain On Music, The Organized Mind
- Michael Lewis (October 15, 1960 – ), Liar's Poker
- Jack London (January 12, 1876 – November 22, 1916), "To Build a Fire"
- Ki Longfellow (December 9, 1944 – ), "The Secret Magdalene"

== M ==
- Nick Mamatas (February 20, 1972 – ), Move Under Ground
- Micheline Aharonian Marcom (1968 – ), Three Apples Fell from Heaven
- Anthony Marra, A Constellation of Vital Phenomena
- Armistead Maupin (May 13, 1944 – ), Tales of the City
- Florence Percy McIntyre (1855–1923), A book of verse
- Terry McMillan (October 18, 1951 – ), Waiting to Exhale
- Cathleen Miller (February 13, 1956 – ), Champion of Choice
- Joaquin Miller (September 8, 1837 – February 17, 1913), "Columbus"
- Christopher Moore (January 1, 1957 – ), Bloodsucking Fiends
- John Muir (1838 – 1914)

== N ==
- Annalee Newitz (1969 – ), White Trash: Race and Class in America
- Janis Cooke Newman (1955 – ), Mary: Mrs. A. Lincoln
- Wendy Newman (1967 – ), 121 First Dates: How to Succeed at Online Dating, Fall in Love, and Live Happily Ever After (Really!)
- Beth Nguyen, Stealing Buddha's Dinner; Short Girls; Pioneer Girl
- Katia Noyes, Crashing America

== O ==
- Carol Anne O'Marie (1933 – 2009)
- Tommy Orange (January 19, 1982 – ), There There

== P ==
- Charlotte Painter (1926 – ), The Fortunes of Laurie Breaux
- Stephan Pastis (January 16, 1968 – ), Pearls Before Swine
- Diana Paxson (February 20, 1943 – ), Mistress of the Jewels
- Howard Pease (September 6, 1894 – April 14, 1974), The Tod Moran Mysteries
- Aimee Phan, We Should Never Meet; The Reeducation of Cherry Truong
- Michael Pollan (February 6, 1955 – ), The Omnivore's Dilemma
- Tim Pratt (December 12, 1976 – ), The Strange Adventures of Rangergirl

== Q ==
- Carol Queen (1958 – ), Real Live Nude Girl
- Lisa Quinn, $500 Room Makeovers

== R ==
- Justin Raimondo (November 18, 1951 – June 27, 2019), Reclaiming the American Right
- Ruth Reichl (January 16, 1948 – ), Tender at the Bone
- Mark Rein-Hagen, Vampire: The Masquerade
- Kathryn Reiss (December 4, 1957 – ), Time Windows
- Barbara Jane Reyes (1971 – ), Poeta en San Francisco
- Rudy Rucker (March 22, 1946 – ), Software

== S ==
- William Saroyan (1908 – 1981)
- Kate Schatz (September 19, 1978 – ), Rad American Women A-Z
- Ariel Schrag (December 29, 1979 – ), Awkward
- Charles M. Schulz (November 26, 1922 – February 12, 2000), Peanuts
- Kemble Scott (1962 – ), SoMa
- Mary Ann Shaffer (December 13, 1934 – February 16, 2008), The Guernsey Literary and Potato Peel Pie Society
- Dave Smeds (1955 – ), The Sorcery Within
- Jane Smiley (September 26, 1949 – ), A Thousand Acres
- Jeremy Adam Smith, The Daddy Shift
- Gary Snyder (1930 – )
- Jeremy Snyder, poet laureate of Vallejo, California
- Rebecca Solnit (1961 – ), River of Shadows
- Starhawk (June 17, 1951 – ), The Spiral Dance
- Joseph Staten, Halo: Contact Harvest
- Danielle Steel (August 14, 1947 – )
- Melissa Stein, Rough Honey, Terrible Blooms
- George Sterling (1869 – 1926)
- George R. Stewart (May 31, 1895 – August 22, 1980), Pickett's Charge
- Lisa Gluskin Stonestreet (1968 – ), The Greenhouse
- Emelie Tracy Y. Swett (1863 – 1892), Californian Illustrated Magazine
- Rachel Swirsky (April 14, 1982 – ), "The Lady Who Plucked Red Flowers Beneath the Queen’s Window"
- Mattilda Bernstein Sycamore, That's Revolting!

== T ==
- Amy Tan (February 19, 1952 – ), The Joy Luck Club
- Michelle Tea (1971 – ), Rose of No Man's Land
- Daniel Terdiman (May 31, 1974 – ), The Entrepreneur's Guide to Second Life
- Walter Tevis (1928 – 1994)
- Robert Alfred Theobald (1884 – 1957), The Final Secret of Pearl Harbor
- Adrian Tomine, Optic Nerve
- Gail Tsukiyama, The Samurai's Garden
- Mark Twain (1835 – April 21, 1910), The Adventures of Tom Sawyer

== V ==
- Abraham Verghese (1955 – ), My Own Country

== W ==
- Ayelet Waldman (December 11, 1964 – ), Love and Other Impossible Pursuits
- Alice Walker (February 9, 1944 – ), The Color Purple
- Vivian Walsh, Olive, the Other Reindeer
- Alice Waters (April 28, 1944 – ), The Art of Simple Food
- Jacob Weisman (February 23, 1965 – ), Death and the Elephant
- Herman Whitaker (1867 – 1919), The Mystery of the Barranca
- Sean Wilsey (1970 – ), Oh the Glory of It All
- Yvor Winters (October 17, 1900 – January 25, 1968), "The Testament of a Stone"
- Emma Wolf (1865 – 1932), A Prodigal in Love
- Naomi Wolf (1962 – )
- Tobias Wolff (June 19, 1945 – ), This Boy's Life
- Russ Woody, The Wheel of Nuldoid

== Y ==
- Laurence Yep (1948 – )

== Z ==
- Daisy Zamora (June 20, 1950 – ), En limpio se escribe la vida
- Helen Zia (1952 – )

== See also ==
- List of people associated with San Francisco
- Litquake
