= Community of Writers =

Annual writing conference in California

Founded in 1969 the Community of Writers is a writers' conference held each summer in Olympic Valley, California. The Community of Writers is a nonprofit 501(c)(3) organization and has a governing Board of Directors.

== History ==
The Community of Writers was founded by novelist Oakley Hall and writer Blair Fuller in 1969. Its first conference was held in August 1970 in the lodges of the ski area; to this day, panels, talks, staff readings and workshops take place in off-season ski lodge facilities. It was originally staffed by San Francisco writers including David Perlman, Walter Ballenger, Barnaby Conrad, and John Leggett, the latter two of whom went on to found, respectively, the Santa Barbara Writers Conference and the Napa Valley Writers Conference.

The organization was originally known as Squaw Valley Community of Writers, reflecting the name of the area at the time it was founded. In December 2003, the Board of Directors voted to change the organization’s name to The Community of Writers at Squaw Valley to clarify that the term "Squaw Valley" referred to the location only, as the word "squaw" was seen as a racially derogatory term by some. By 2021, the organization had shortened its name to Community of Writers and switched to calling the valley Olympic Valley when the locality itself did.

== Workshop ==
Workshops are held in fiction, (directors Lisa D. Alvarez and Louis B. Jones), nonfiction (director Michael Carlisle), poetry (director Robert Hass), and screenwriting (director Diana Fuller). From 1980 until 2000, novelist Carolyn Doty directed the writers workshops. William Fox directed the poetry program during the years when it was integrated with prose. Later, poet Galway Kinnell reinvented and directed the Poetry Program for 17 years until 2004. The Screenwriters Workshop was founded by screenwriters Tom Rickman and Gill Dennis. The Community of Writers continues to be directed by Brett Hall Jones.

== Admission ==
The Community has a formal and competitive admissions procedure. Applicants are asked to submit an application fee and a writing sample. Average acceptance rate is 33%. Roughly 50% of those who attend are granted some form of financial aid. Scholarships and financial aid is provided through the donations for alumni, staff and friends. The conference generally offers 8 fiction workshops of 12 participants each and two narrative nonfiction/memoir workshops of 12 each.

== Authors ==
Noted authors who have been associated with the conference over the years include Bill Barich, Henry Carlisle, Olga Carlisle, Don Carpenter, Alan Cheuse, Mark Childress, Lucille Clifton, Janet Fitch, Herbert Gold, Jay Gummerman, Gerald Haslam, James D. Houston, Diane Johnson, Yusef Komunyakaa, Li-Young Lee, Philip Levine, Peter Matthiessen, David Perlman, Alice Sebold, Mary Lee Settle, Gary Snyder, Max Steele, Robert Stone, Mark Strand, Charles Wright, Dean Young.

== Faculty ==
Recent teaching staff included:

Poets: Kazim Ali, Don Mee Choi, Camille Dungy, Cornelius Eady, Katie Ford, Forrest Gander, Robert Hass, Brenda Hillman, Cathy Park Hong, Juan Felipe Herrera, Major Jackson, Ada Limón, Harryette Mullen, Sharon Olds, Evie Shockley, CD Wright, Matthew Zapruder

Recent Fiction and Nonfiction writers: Steve Almond, Tom Barbash, Sarah Shun-lien Bynum, Ron Carlson, Mark Childress, Alex Espinoza, Dagoberto Gilb, Janet Fitch, Lynn Freed, Richard Ford, Karen Joy Fowler, Glen David Gold, Sands Hall, Dana Johnson, Anne Lamott, Michelle Latiolais, Yiyun Li, Malcolm Margolin, Joanne Meschery, Victoria Patterson, Varley O'Connor, Kirstin Valdez Quade, Jason Roberts, Robin Romm, Alice Sebold, Martin J. Smith, Gregory Spatz, Elizabeth Tallent, Amy Tan, Hector Tobar, Diana Wagman, Josh Weil, Tiphanie Yanique, Al Young

For over 30 years, Gill Dennis taught the special Finding the Story Workshop at the Community of Writers until his death in 2015.

Teaching Screenwriters include: Eugene Corr, Trey Ellis, Christopher Monger, Frank Pierson, Judith Rascoe, Tom Rickman, Don Roos, Camille Thomasson, Christopher Upham, Michael Urban, Jason Wolos

== Other projects ==
The Poetry Program publishes an annual anthology of poems first written at the workshop.

In 2007, Writers Workshop in a Book: The S.V. Community of Writers on the Art of Fiction, edited by Alan Cheuse and Lisa Alvarez, with a foreword by Richard Ford, was published.

The Community of Writers once sponsored the "Art of the Wild Writers' Conference" along with U.C. Davis, but that program has been discontinued.

Published Alumni Reading Series: Each summer, recently published alumni return to the conference with their recently published books. Alumni who have been part of this reading series include Anita Amirrezvani, Eddy Ancinas, Ramona Ausubel, David Bajo, Charmaine Craig, Eileen Cronin, Heather Donahue, Cai Emmons, Amy Franklin-Willis, Joshua Ferris, Jamie Ford, Vicki Forman, Alison Singh Gee, Tanya Egan Gibson, Alan Grostephan, Judith Hendricks, Susan Henderson, Sara J. Henry, Rhoda Huffey, Alma Katsu, Krys Lee, Edan Lepucki, Paulette Livers, Regina Louise, Michael David Lukas, Peyton Marshall, Marisa Matarazzo, Mark Maynard, Janis Cooke Newman, Jessica O’Dwyer, Aline Ohanesian, Victoria Patterson, Andrew Roe, Adrienne Sharp, Jordan Fisher Smith, Scott Sparling, Ellen Sussman, Lisa Tucker, Brenda Rickman Vantrease, Mary Volmer, Dora Calott Wang, M.D., Andrew Winer, Alia Yunis, Désirée Zamorano among others including those who have returned as teaching staff.

== Alumni ==
Writers and poets who have attended the Community of Writers as participants (students) include: Chimamanda Ngozi Adichie, Phillip Barron, Aimee Bender, David Benioff, Elise Blackwell, Michael Chabon, Meg Waite Clayton, Carol Edgarian, Selden Edwards, Jennifer Egan, Thomas Sayers Ellis, Molly Fisk, Lev Grossman, Patricia Spears Jones, Troy Jollimore, Maile Meloy, Nami Mun, Kem Nunn, Kris Saknussemm, Frederick Reiken, Anne Rice, Elizabeth Rosner and many others, including those who have returned as teaching staff.

== See also ==
- List of writers' conferences
