= Cultural impact of The Colbert Report =

US late-night talk show in popular culture

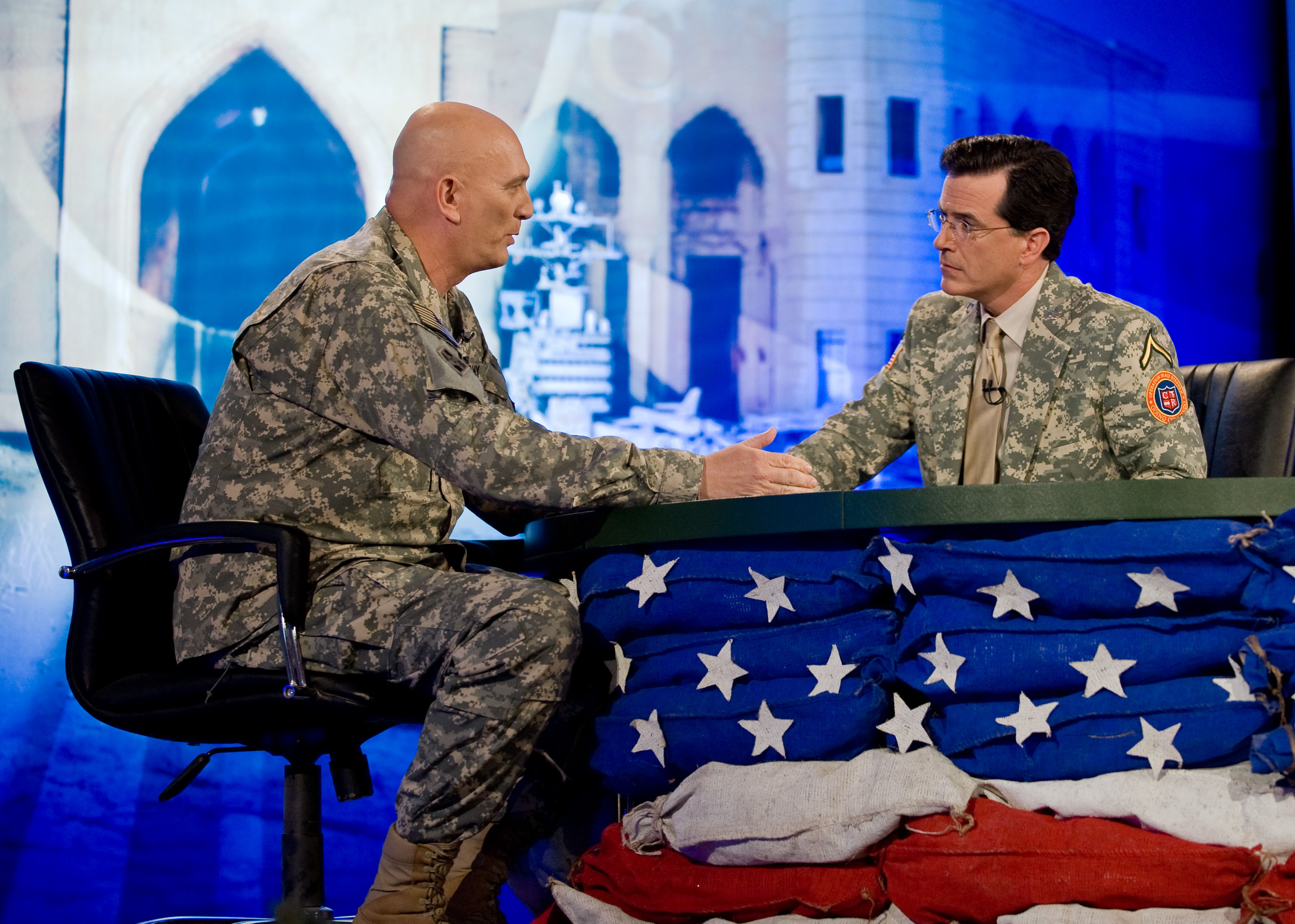
Stephen Colbert interviewing General Ray Odierno

The Colbert Report, which premiered in American cable television on October 17, 2005, has had a massive cultural impact since its inception. Issues in and references to American and world culture are attributed to the character played by Stephen Colbert, who calls his followers the Colbert Nation. The Colbert Report is a late-night talk and satirical news program hosted by Colbert that aired on Comedy Central from October 17, 2005, to December 18, 2014, for 1,447 episodes. The show focused on a fictional anchorman character named Stephen Colbert, played by his real-life namesake. The character, described by Colbert as a "well-intentioned, poorly informed, high-status idiot," is a caricature of televised political pundits. The show satirized conservative personality-driven political talk programs, particularly Fox News' The O'Reilly Factor. The Colbert Report is a spin-off of Comedy Central's The Daily Show, where Colbert was a correspondent from 1997 to 2005.

The program, created by Colbert, Jon Stewart, and Ben Karlin, lampooned current events and American political happenings. The show's structure consisted of an introductory monologue and a guest interview, in which the Colbert character attempts to deconstruct his opponent's argument. The show was taped in New York City's Hell's Kitchen neighborhood, and the program's set and branding was "hyper-American," epitomizing the Colbert character's large ego. The show was taped and broadcast Monday through Thursday, with weeks taken off at multiple points in a given year for breaks. The Colbert Report saw immediate critical and ratings successes, leading to various awards, including multiple Emmy and Peabody Awards. The show's cultural influence often extended beyond the show's traditional viewing audience, including Colbert running for U.S. President twice, co-hosting a rally at the National Mall, presenting a controversial performance at the White House Correspondents' Dinner, and establishing a real Super PAC that raised over a million dollars. The show also inspired various forms of multimedia, including music and multiple best-selling books.

== Presented as non-satirical journalism ==
In May 2006, the Tom DeLay Legal Defense Trust posted a video of The Colbert Report on its website and sent out a mass email urging DeLay supporters to watch how "Hollywood liberal" Robert Greenwald "crashed and burned ... when promoting his new attack on Tom DeLay." The video featured Colbert asking questions such as, "Who hates America more, you or Michael Moore?" The trust's email describes its content as "the truth behind Liberal Hollywood's" film about DeLay, and characterizes the Colbert Report clip with the headline, "Colbert Cracks the Story on Real Motivations Behind the Movie." On June 8, 2006, Colbert responded by conducting an "Exclusive Fake Interview" on his show with DeLay. Three different interviews with DeLay on different networks were spliced for humorous effect, and Colbert ended the "interview" by saying "I do hope you enjoyed my manipulation of your words." DeLay has since appeared as a guest on the program.

On July 25, 2006, Colbert responded to television networks – specifically Fox News, NBC's The Today Show and ABC's Good Morning America – which took comments made by Florida Congressman Robert Wexler on The Colbert Report out of context (e.g.: "I enjoy cocaine and the company of prostitutes because they are a fun thing to do."). Wexler, who ran unopposed in the then-upcoming election, made the comments in response to urging by Colbert that he "say some things that would really lose the election for [Wexler] if [Wexler] were contested." Colbert criticized the major networks' morning news shows that featured the interview in a misleading and a negative light, by showing clips from many of the "fluff" pieces they favored instead of "real" news. Colbert subsequently told his viewers to "vote Wexler, the man's got a sense of humor, unlike, evidently, journalists."

== Animals named for Colbert ==
Colbert announced on his March 28, 2006 show that he had been contacted by San Francisco Zoo officials seeking his permission to name an unhatched bald eagle after him. The eagle, affectionately dubbed Stephen Jr. on The Report, was bred to be reintroduced into the wild, as a part of the zoo's California Bald Eagle Breeding Program. Colbert celebrated the chick's birth on the April 17, 2006, program, and has since given updates on the bird's development. He has criticized the bird for migrating to Canada, and has attempted to lure him back to the U.S. On December 24, 2008, Stephen Jr. (tag A-46) was photographed at the Lower Klamath National Wildlife Refuge on the California/Oregon border.

On September 30, 2006, the Saginaw Spirit, an OHL hockey team in Saginaw, Michigan, named its co-mascot Steagle Colbeagle the Eagle in honor of Colbert, despite the fact that it was spotted holding a Canadian flag during the anthem. Before the introduction of the mascot, the team record was 0–3–0–1, but once the Steagle was introduced, the team improved their record to 44–21–0–3 by the season's end, before losing in the first round of the playoffs. On January 27, 2007, Oshawa, Ontario declared March 20 of that year (John Gray's birthday) Stephen Colbert Day after mayor John Gray bet Colbert that the Oshawa Generals would beat the Spirit, and Saginaw won 5–4.

In the latter part of March 2007, Drexel University named a leatherback turtle in honor of Colbert in their Great Turtle Race. "Stephanie Colburtle the Leatherback Turtle" came in second place, losing to a turtle named Billie.

On June 24, 2008, Dr. Jason Bond, an associate professor with the Department of Biology at East Carolina University, appeared on the show because he agreed to name a spider after Colbert. They negotiated over what kind of spider would be named after Colbert, and Colbert told the professor that they would "settle this in the next couple of weeks". During the interview, the visual approximation of Bond changed between different pictures depicting Spider-Man, including Tobey Maguire (the actor who played Spider-Man in the films) and costumed people/animals. The spider was officially announced on August 6 as the Aptostichus stephencolberti.

Colbert announced on February 5, 2009, that the UC Santa Cruz Marine Lab named an elephant seal in honor of him: Stelephant Colbert the Elephant Seal.

== Places and things named for Colbert ==
In 2006, the ice hockey team Saginaw Spirit named their mini mascot "Steagle Colbeagle" after they held a naming contest. As of 2014, the team still had Steagle Colbeagle as their mini mascot.

In February 2007, Ben & Jerry's unveiled a new ice cream flavor in honor of Colbert, named Stephen Colbert's AmeriCone Dream (available only in the United States). Colbert waited until Easter to sample the ice cream because he "gave up sweets for Lent." Colbert will donate all proceeds to charity through the new Stephen Colbert AmeriCone Dream Fund, which will distribute the money to various causes. The flavor is described as "a decadent melting pot of vanilla ice cream with fudge-covered waffle cone pieces and a caramel swirl." The company's founders appeared on the show on March 5, 2007, to discuss the ice cream and to plug their "grassroots education and advocacy project", TrueMajority.

On August 22, 2007, Richard Branson, who was being interviewed as a guest, announced that one of his Virgin America aeroplanes would be named Air Colbert. Colbert announced on April 2, 2008, during a ThreatDown segment, that the plane had been grounded after one of its engines was damaged by a bird strike.

During the sweepstakes for naming the new wing on the International Space Station, Colbert announced on his show that there was a write-in section where you could write your own suggestion for a name in. He encouraged his fans to write in "Colbert". When the sweepstakes was over, NASA announced that "Colbert" had beaten the next-most-popular choice, "Serenity," by over 40,000 votes on March 11, 2009. "Colbert" received 230,539 votes out of nearly 1.2 million cast.

On April 15, 2009, NASA announced that instead of the new module being named after him, a treadmill on board the space station would be called the Combined Operational Load Bearing External Resistance Treadmill (C.O.L.B.E.R.T.).

== Honors bestowed by media organizations ==
Time magazine's James Poniewozik named it one of the Top 10 Returning Series of 2007, ranking it at #7.

Colbert has appeared on the covers of several major magazines, including Wired, Rolling Stone, Esquire, Sports Illustrated (as sponsor of the US Speedskating team) and Newsweek, in which he was the guest editor.

On March 12, 2007, the editor-in-chief of Marvel Comics, Joe Quesada, awarded Colbert the shield of the recently deceased superhero Captain America. The letter to Colbert accompanying the shield stated that "the Star-Spangled Avenger has bequeathed... his indestructible shield to the only man he believed to have the red, white, and blue balls to carry the mantle." Colbert promised to use the shield "only to fight for justice...and to impress girls." It was, in fact, one of only two full-sized prop shields which had previously been kept in the Marvel offices. On January 29, 2008, Quesada (now president of Marvel) returned to announce that Colbert's fictional campaign for the presidency was still active in the Marvel universe, references to which have appeared in Marvel comics since. Colbert appears on the cover of Amazing Spider-Man #573.

At the end of 2008, The Colbert Report was named the number one television series of that year by Entertainment Weekly.

In 2010 Colbert won the Golden Tweet Award.

== Arts ==
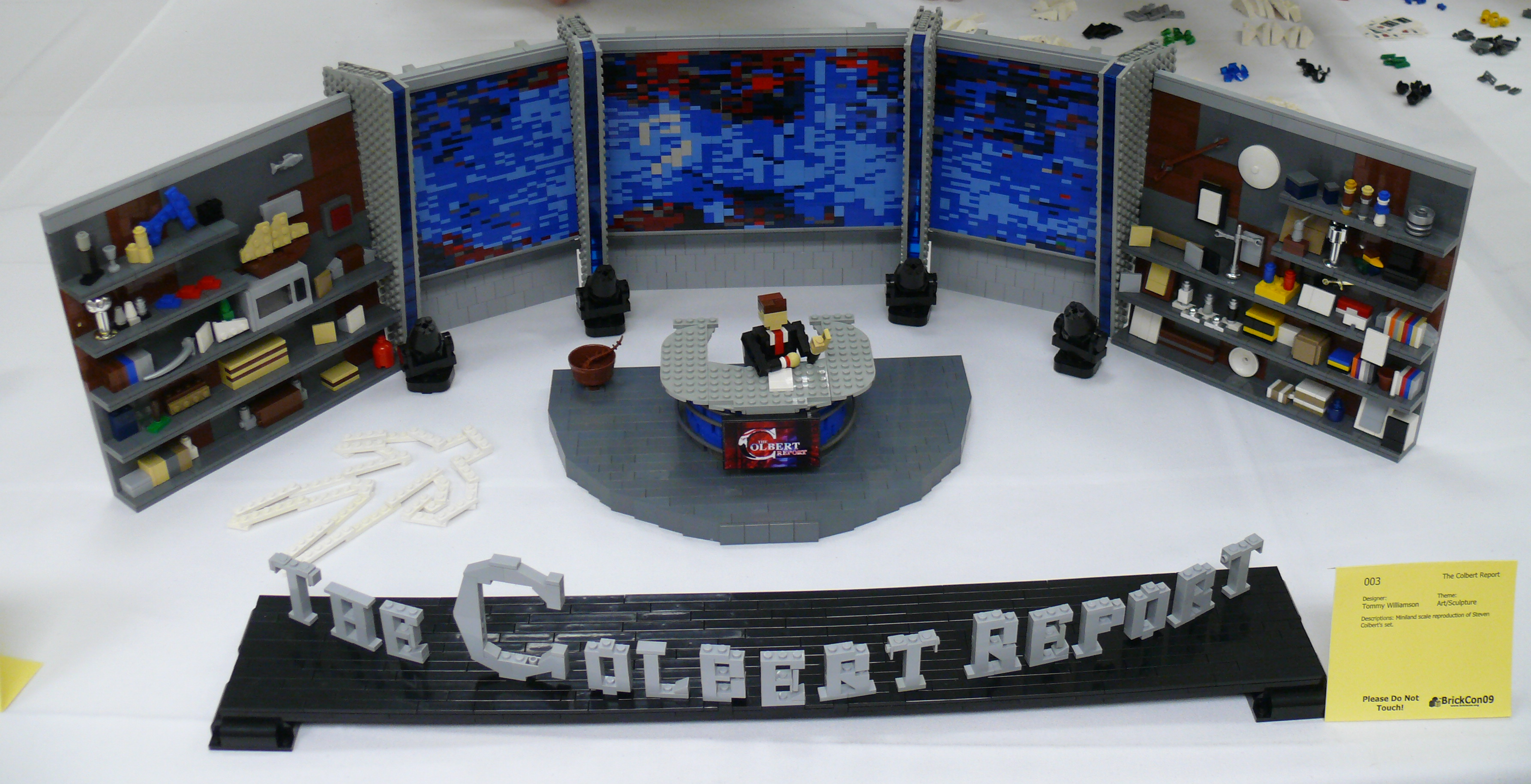
A Lego model of The Colbert Report set at BrickCon 2009 in Seattle

On October 17, 2008, it was announced that the portrait of Colbert from his second year of The Colbert Report was accepted into the national portrait collection at the National Museum of American History for its November reopening.

== Athletics ==
On November 2, 2009, Colbert, representing the Colbert Nation, signed an on-air sponsorship agreement with U.S. speedskating executive director Robert Crowley. Fundraising via The Colbert Report ultimately raised $300,000 for the US Winter Olympics speedskating team. Coverage of the show's efforts also led to Colbert personally being invited to be the official ombudsman at the oval for the Olympics, appointed as the official assistant sports psychologist for the US Olympics speed skating team, and as such is now an official member of the team, and invited by Dick Ebersol, to be part of NBC's 2010 Winter Olympics coverage team.

== Congressional response ==
In response to the "Better Know a District" segment, Rahm Emanuel, then the Democratic Caucus chair, instructed incoming freshmen not to do appearances on the show.

== Neologisms ==
The Colbert Report has created new words. Besides "truthiness", Colbert has coined other terms including "freem", which is "freedom without the do, because I do it all for you." Other words include: "eneagled", a blend of "enabled" and "eagle", thus meaning "to be given the characteristics of an eagle" and "mantasy", meaning male fantasies, such as running away from the wife to become free, a word to which Colbert claims to hold a trademark. In 2009, he coined the word "engayify" meaning "to gay it up."

== Wikipedia references ==
Colbert made repeated references on the show to Wikipedia, which he referred to as his favorite website, generally in "The Wørd" segment. Colbert's first reference to Wikipedia was during the July 31, 2006 broadcast, when "The Word" was Wikiality, defined as the concept that "together we can create a reality that we all agree on – the reality we just agreed on". The premise of wikiality is that reality is what the wiki says it is. He explained that on Wikipedia "any user can change any entry, and if enough users agree with them, it becomes true". He also told his viewers to edit the Wikipedia article on elephants to edit say: "Elephant population in Africa has tripled over the past six months." The suggestion resulted in numerous changes to Wikipedia articles related to elephants and Africa. Editing of the articles concerned was restricted to prevent further edits. The pages' protection expiration date has been postponed several times as the vandalism ensued again.

Another Colbert neologism related to Wikipedia is "Wikilobbying", regarding which he stated "when money determines Wikipedia entries, reality has become a commodity". He alluded to a case involving controversy over whether governments should reject a Microsoft document format in favor of an independent standard, during which Microsoft allegedly hired a Linux user to edit Wikipedia to ensure neutral and factual coverage of Microsoft's version. Colbert used the term "self-determination" to refer to corporations being able to act out their fantasies online by editing their own Wikipedia entries. Colbert described Wikipedia as "Second Life for corporations", saying that if a corporation wants to pretend to be someone else online, then that is their business.

In another episode, guest Dan Zaccagnino was discussing his new wiki where readers could share their musical compositions. In an imitation of record scratching, Colbert used the term "Wiki-Wiki-Wikipedia".

On May 24, 2007, the guest was Jimmy Wales, the co-founder of Wikipedia. Colbert called Wikipedia a "battlefield for information", a tool which "brings democracy to information" and moves away from the views of the "elite who study things and get to say what is or is not real". During the interview, Colbert showed a sentence on the screen, "Librarians are hiding something." Wales was not allowed to see it, implying that he could not personally stop a critical mass of individuals from editing a page when he did not know which page was the target. Wales responded that "the interesting thing about The Colbert Report is that Wikipedians watch it".

On June 9, 2008, Colbert mentioned Warren G. Harding as being a "secret negro president", and said that for proof, "the G stands for Gangsta" which he edited Wikipedia to state so that he could cite a source.

== Hungarian bridge campaign ==
In 2006, the Ministry of Transport of Hungary launched an online call for public suggestions to name a future motorway bridge over the Danube, just north of Budapest. Ministry officials said the Hungarian Geographical Name Committee would choose from among the three submitted candidates with the most votes, guided by suggestions submitted by "local governments, cartographers, linguists, and other experts". Users offered hundreds of suggestions, among them the "'You Can Go To Bratislava But Not Over This Bridge' Bridge" and the "Chuck Norris Bridge", which led in votes for some time. Colbert noted the effort in his "Tip of the hat, wag of the finger" segment on August 9, and in the following weeks, he continued to ask viewers to vote for him. On August 22, Hungarian news sites reported Colbert had won the first round of voting with 17,231,724 votes, which is 7 million more people than there are in all of Hungary. Hungary changed the voting rules after the members of the Colbert Nation Forums developed a bot to stuff the ballot box, requiring registration to vote in the second phase. That night, Colbert asked his viewers to cease their efforts, and offered apologies, spending a segment honoring Hungary, its history, and its contributions to the world.

On September 14, 2006, Colbert introduced his guest András Simonyi, Ambassador of the Republic of Hungary to the United States. The ambassador presented Mr. Colbert with a declaration certifying him as the winner of the second and final round of voting. The document bore the signatures of Hungarian government officials and the country's official seal. Included in the text, as read by the ambassador, were two important conditions required for the name of the bridge to be made official. First, Colbert must be fluent in Hungarian. Colbert responded by pronouncing the Hungarian name Nicholas Zrinyi (incorrectly referring to Miklós Zrínyi) and híd (meaning 'bridge' in Hungarian); Simonyi quickly certified him as fluent. The second requirement proved more onerous: To have the bridge named after him, Colbert would have to be deceased. Colbert protested, but the ambassador presented him with a Hungarian passport and 10,000 Hungarian Forint (HUF), noting that this would allow Colbert to enter Hungary at any time, without restriction. He also brought attention to the portrait of King St. Stephen, the first King of Hungary, on the 10,000 HUF bill. Finally Simonyi implied that the question of Colbert's ineligibility by virtue of being alive might be resolved if Colbert were to accept an invitation to visit the bridge site in Budapest; Colbert responded by trying to bribe the ambassador with the 10,000 HUF bill. On September 28, 2006, it was announced that the bridge will be named "Megyeri Bridge", although the name did not make it to the second round. According to the Geographical Name Committee, the name was selected because the bridge connects Káposztásmegyer [hu] with Békásmegyer.

== Remix competitions ==
Colbert sometimes implicitly suggests that his fans remix various aspects of his show simply by telling them not to remix it. In January 2009, he told viewers not to remix his interview with Lawrence Lessig, founder of Creative Commons, which lets authors of creative works share them with the world. This type of fan involvement is similar to the Colbert Green Screen Challenge, which focuses on video content editing.

== Running for President in 2008 ==
On October 16, 2007, Colbert announced on The Report that he would be running for president. He had chosen no vice-president, though he was considering choosing Vladimir Putin, Mike Huckabee, or himself as his running mate. Colbert declared that he was only running in South Carolina, his home state, and was contemplating running for both the Republican and Democratic parties as a "favorite son." Colbert covered his story in the segment "The Hail to the Cheese Stephen Colbert NachoCheese Doritos 2008 Presidential Campaign Coverage" and promoted his campaign on his special election website colbert08.org, as under law he cannot use colbertnation.com.

On October 21, 2007, Colbert was interviewed by host Tim Russert on NBC's Meet The Press. Colbert explained why he changed the pronunciation of his name (from "COLE-Bert" to "Cole-BEAR"), demanded to know whether Russert believes that God supports our enemies in Iraq and revealed that he had no interest in winning the Presidency (he just wanted to run).

On November 1, 2007, the executive council of the South Carolina Democratic Party voted 13–3 to keep his name off the ballot and refunded his US$2500 filing fee. By November 5, 2007, Colbert had officially dropped his presidential bid.

== Insults and apologies about numerous US towns named Canton ==
On the July 21, 2008, episode of The Colbert Report, Colbert made a comment about John McCain making a campaign stop in Canton, Ohio, and "not the crappy Canton in Georgia." The comment resulted in a local uproar, with the Canton, Georgia mayor insisting Colbert had never visited the town along with an invitation for him to do so.

On July 30, 2008, Colbert apologized for the story, insisting that he was incorrect and that the real crappy Canton was Canton, Kansas, after which he made several jokes at the Kansas town's expense including calling the town a "shit hole". The reaction from Mayor Brad Smiley and the local residents was partly negative and partly positive; overall, they rebuffed Colbert's disparagement, but appreciated the opportunity to inform the public of the town's benefits and unique features. Kansas governor Kathleen Sebelius invited Colbert to spend a night in Canton's historic jail.

On August 5, 2008, Colbert apologized to the citizens of Canton, Kansas, he then maintained that he had meant to direct his mock derision towards Canton, South Dakota, by calling it "North Dakota's dirty ashtray" and satirizing the town in song.

On August 12, 2008, Colbert once again apologized to his latest comedic target even though local reaction to the insult was fairly mild. Referring to a line from his satirical song, Colbert said that not all the dogs run away from Canton, South Dakota but "some stay and develop a drinking problem." However, as with the previous apologies, he began a new tirade on another Canton. According to Colbert, Canton, Texas is nothing but an "incorporated outhouse" and "one steaming pile of longhorn dung." He then asked the audience if they had seen the town's tourism video. A video then promptly followed showing a monkey humping another monkey with the words Canton, Texas placed in the corner and an arrow pointing from the name to the monkey on bottom. This jab at the Texas town had been predicted by Governor Sebelius at the end of her July 31, 2008, remarks. In response to Colbert's comments, a Canton, Texas city councilman joked that he wanted Colbert to come there so he could "mash his nose".

On October 28, 2008, Colbert reacted to the news that Barack Obama was campaigning for president in Canton, Ohio – the original good Canton – by saying that he was forced to admit that Canton, Ohio in fact was the real crappy Canton all along.

== The Colbert Bump ==
The "Colbert Bump" is defined, connotatively by the Report, as an increase in popularity of a person (author, musician, politician, etc.) or thing (website, etc.) as a result of appearing as a guest on or (in the case of a thing) being mentioned on the show. For example, if a politician appears on The Colbert Report, they may become more popular with certain voters and thus are more likely to be elected. According to a study by James H. Fowler, contributions to Democratic politicians rose 40% for 30 days after an appearance on the show. The Mozilla Foundation also experienced a noticeable spike in the download rates of the Firefox browser right after the launch of Firefox 3 was mentioned in the program. Magazines such as GQ, Newsweek and Sports Illustrated have all had sales spikes when Colbert appeared on their covers. Book publicist Jynne Martin commented "What's extraordinary is that even interviews that are completely absurd and barely touch on the books have this spike to them... ...There's an unbelievable trust in his instincts — $26.95 worth of trust. Hardcover books cost a lot of money."

=== Colbert Bump (alcoholic beverage) ===
A cocktail called the Colbert Bump was designed during the August 4, 2009, episode of The Colbert Report by author David Wondrich. The recipe for a Colbert Bump includes one ounce of Cherry Heering liqueur, one and a half ounces of gin, a quarter of an ounce of lemon juice, and a little soda water.

== NASA's Node 3 ==
In March 2009, NASA ran an online contest to name the new node of the International Space Station. Colbert encouraged his viewers to write in his name. By the end, 230,539 "Colbert" votes were cast. This beat Serenity, the top NASA choice, by more than 40,000 votes. On April 14, 2009, Astronaut "Suni" Sunita Williams appeared on The Colbert Report, and announced the name of the node to be Tranquility. However, the treadmill the astronauts use to work out on will be named "C.O.L.B.E.R.T." for "Combined Operational Load Bearing External Resistance Treadmill" and this will be located in Tranquility.

The Mars Society temporarily renamed their Mars Desert Research Station "Colbert" for one week in April, citing the likelihood that Node 3 would not be given that name in a press release.

== 2009 Gulf special ==
On March 17, 2009, Colbert announced that the show would be broadcasting from somewhere in The Persian Gulf at some future date. He did not reveal where and when the taping would occur, as that would have presented a security breach. As part of this he made a segment called "Where in the world and when in time is Stephen Colbert gonna be in the Gulf?" In it he offered vague clues to the location via a Press Your Luck board, and described the location being somewhere "sandy" and "packed with troops". He repeatedly alluded to places he might go, but refused to divulge specific details. On the May 4 show, director and writer J. J. Abrams (Lost, Alias, Cloverfield, and Star Trek) appeared as a guest, and revealed that he had found out where Colbert was headed and had hidden clues to the location throughout the broadcast, leaving it to the viewers to decipher their meaning. On June 5, 2009, Colbert officially announced that "Operation Iraqi Stephen: Going Commando" would be taping and performing shows in Iraq from June 8 to June 11, 2009, making The Colbert Report the first TV show in USO history to produce a week of shows in a combat zone. The shows were filmed at Camp Victory in the Al-Faw Palace.

Colbert's head was shaved on stage by General Raymond T. Odierno, commander of the Multinational Force – Iraq, at the videotaped order given by President Barack Obama during the first of four taped performances that were aired June 8, 2009 through June 11, 2009. He wore a civilian two-piece suit, but with a twist: it was tailored from the United States Army's UCP digital camouflage pattern and featured an American flag and Private rank insignias on the sleeves. Vice President Joe Biden and Senators John McCain and Jim Webb made special appearances, as did former GOP vice presidential nominee Sarah Palin and former Presidents Bill Clinton, George W. Bush, and George H. W. Bush. Actor Tom Hanks was also featured heavily in a pre-recorded segment encouraging viewers to support care packages for the troops. At the start of all four episodes filmed in Iraq, Colbert carried a golf club on stage to honor Bob Hope's decades-long service, 250 years according to Colbert, for the USO across the world.

== U.S. Olympic speed skating sponsorship ==
On November 2, 2009, Colbert, representing the Colbert Nation, signed a sponsorship agreement on-air with U.S. speedskating executive director Robert Crowley after learning of the loss of the team's prominent sponsor: Dutch bank DSB. The specifics of this sponsorship are unclear. The change of the logo of the U.S. speed skating team's cap, from DSB to Colbert Nation was later shown in the November 12 episode and further episodes. Colbert has also taken aim at Canada, mocking and insulting them, claiming they were not giving the speed skaters adequate ice time at Olympic rink in Vancouver in preparation for the 2010 Winter Olympics. The city of Richmond, where the Olympic Oval is located, had responded with a letter inviting him to be the official ombudsman at the oval for the Olympics, under the condition that he wear the official ombudsman headgear (a pink tuque) at all times.

As a result, Colbert attempted to make the US Olympic team in various sports including speedskating in which the final spot would be his if he were to beat Shani Davis in a 500m race. He lost, but became the Assistant Sport Psychologist to the US Speedskating team (Colbert holds an honorary Doctorate in Fine Arts). This perk also ensured that he would be able to be a journalist covering the 2010 Winter Olympics on his own show, and NBC where he filed speedskating reports during their primetime telecasts with Bob Costas as host. Conversely, Colbert would also feature NBC hosts and reporters covering the Olympics in his coverage of the games, alongside Olympic athletes, many of whom were from the US Speedskating team.

== Raj Patel's identification as the "Messiah" ==
Benjamin Creme, self-proclaimed esotericist, and owner of Share International magazine, identified the coming "Messiah/Maitreya (or future Buddha)" as having been: born in 1972; traveled to London from India in 1977; been dark-skinned, and having a stutter. Shortly after Raj Patel, the author of the recent book, "The Value of Nothing" appeared on the show, Creme stated the Messiah had appeared on a popular television program in the United States. Patel was identified as such messiah by Creme's followers, as he fulfilled all of Creme's previous predictions. In the March 15, 2010 show, Colbert claimed this was product of a Colbert Bump and called Patel on the telephone to confirm his status as the deity, which the author denied. However, Benjamin Creme had also predicted that the Messiah would deny his status, reinforcing his followers' belief in Patel's divine status.

== Global Zero ==
Queen Noor of Jordan appeared on The Colbert Report to promote Global Zero, an international, non-partisan, initiative to achieve phased, binding, and verifiable elimination of nuclear weapons. Colbert signed the Global Zero declaration during the interview.

== 2006 White House Correspondents Association Dinner ==
Colbert gave a satirical speech at the 2006 White House Correspondents' Association Dinner in which he criticized the Bush Administration and the news media. The performance earned him praise and scorn in the media.

== 2010 congressional testimony for migrant workers ==
On September 24, 2010, Colbert testified in character before the House Judiciary Subcommittee on Immigration, Citizenship, and Border Security. He was invited by committee chairwoman Zoe Lofgren to describe his experience participating in the United Farm Workers' "Take Our Jobs" program, where he spent a day working alongside migrant workers in upstate New York. At the end of his often-humorous testimony, Colbert broke character in responding to a question from Rep. Judy Chu, D-CA, and explained why he cares about the plight of migrant workers.

"I like talking about people who don't have any power, and this seems like one of the least powerful people in the United States are migrant workers who come and do our work, but don't have any rights as a result. And yet we still invite them to come here and at the same time ask them to leave. And that's an interesting contradiction to me. And, you know, 'Whatsoever you do for the least of my brothers,' and these seem like the least of our brothers right now... Migrant workers suffer and have no rights."

Democratic committee member John Conyers questioned whether it was appropriate for the comedian to appear before Congress and asked him to leave the hearing. Though Colbert offered to depart at the direction of the committee chairwoman, Rep. Lofgren requested that he stay at least until all opening testimony had been completed, whereupon Conyers withdrew his request.

Conservative pundits took aim at his Congress testimony not long after.

"As John Conyers notes, the media and spectators turned out to see whether Colbert would address the panel seriously as an expert on immigration and make the panel a joke, or stay in character and make the panel a bigger joke," – Ed Morrissey, Hot Air.

== "Keep Fear Alive" rally ==
After Glenn Beck's Restoring Honor rally in Washington, D.C., a user on Reddit suggested that Colbert hold his own Restoring Truthiness rally, and a website and Facebook page for the event were set up overnight. A big announcement was first hinted at by Jon Stewart on September 7, who ended the show with a Moment of Zen supposedly holding a clue about the announcement. On the same day, Colbert acknowledged the online movement. He played a clip of Beck saying the geese at his event were sent by God, and insisted that he would need his own God geese to tell him to hold a rally. After consulting "Geese Witherspoon" and a bottle of Grey Goose vodka, Colbert responded to Stewart's announcement with a promise to make "an even bigger counter-announcement."

The next day, Stewart responded to Colbert's announcement by showing what was going on inside his brain, and yet again ended the show with an announcement-related Moment of Zen, as he did the next day.

The following Monday, Colbert finally responded to Stewart, first mocking him for his facial hair, then responding to the "brain-cam" with his own "gut-cam." Colbert then brought up the online rally and how viewers were sending him toy geese and releasing doves outside his studio, finally asking people to stop sending him live animals.

To get Colbert's attention, Reddit users also encouraged people to donate to DonorsChoose, a charity organization that benefits teachers across the country. In less than a day, members of the Colbert Nation raised over $100,000. As of October 28, 2010, Reddit raised more than $500,000.

September 15's Daily Show ended with a toss to Colbert, and both acted coy about their competing announcements. That night's Colbert Report ended with Colbert announcing he would make his big announcement the next day, dropping hints that it would have to do with D.C. and the date October 10, 2010. On September 16, Colbert announced plans to host a 'Keep Fear Alive' rally on the National Mall on October 30, 2010.

The combined Rally to Restore Sanity and/or Fear was duly held on October 30, attracting nearly a quarter of a million participants. As the result of the rally, Metrorail set a new Saturday ridership record of 825,437 trips, as compared to about 350,000 trips on a normal Saturday.

== Colbert Super PAC ==
On March 10, 2011, during a segment on 2012 presidential contender Tim Pawlenty's political action committee (PAC), Colbert announced the formation of his own PAC and hosted former FEC Chairman Trevor Potter on the program to help him fill out the paperwork. Troubled by the fact that large corporations were not donating to his SuperPAC, Potter explained that corporations prefer to support political causes when the corporations can remain anonymous. Therefore, he helped Colbert set up a 501(c)(4) Delaware Shell corporation in which donations can be given anonymously without limit and used for political purposes. Colbert asked what the difference was between that and money laundering. Potter answered, "It's hard to say." On November 12, Colbert shut down his Super PAC, citing the death of his fictional advisor Ham Rove. Potter advised him that by making a check with the remaining funds out to his 501(c)(4), with an "Agency Letter" telling it to transfer that money to a second anonymous 501(c)(4), he would not have to tell anyone – even the IRS – what happened to that money.

== Washington Redskins incident ==
Following the creation of a non-profit organization by the owner of the Washington Redskins, Colbert said that he would create the "Ching-Chong Ding-Dong Foundation for Sensitivity to Orientals or Whatever" in order to bring attention to the hypocrisy of the name. The following day, Suey Park created the hashtag #CancelColbert in order to draw attention to a tweet made by the Comedy Central-operated account of The Colbert Report. Park interpreted the tweet, which repeated the line from Colbert's show, as a tasteless joke made at the expense of Asians and Asian-Americans. Park's hashtag became a trending topic on Twitter, and the tweet was later deleted. While the hashtag was trending, Park's efforts were widely criticized by the media. Later stating that he never wants "this to happen again," Colbert deleted the Comedy Central-run account on his show and directed people to follow his personal account.

== Amazon.com and Hachette Book Group controversy ==
On the June 4, 2014 episode, Colbert briefly broke down the details of a dispute that Amazon was having with book publisher Hachette, who has printed every book he has authored (and is the issuer for thousands more authors). In a Los Angeles Times interview; fellow Hachette author James Patterson expressed fear in regard to the depths Amazon will go to maintain control over book pricing, publishing, and sales of any e-retail in general. The main issue between the two companies is of e-book sales, and Amazon's lowering of prices to what certain publishers consider unsustainable for their business. Considering Amazon's domination when it comes to bookselling (between 40 and 50% of all book sales) and the myriad products it has since taken to selling due to its success with literature, it is slowing down or halting all sales of published or upcoming books produced by Hachette with no end in sight, notifying potential customers that it would be a better decision to shop elsewhere for any Hachette books. In response to his books being delayed or outright banned from being ordered, Colbert (as well as fellow Hachette author Sherman Alexie) encouraged the Colbert Nation to order California from first-time author Edan Lepucki from Portland, Oregon bookseller Powell's Books linked to Colbert's website (as well as "I Didn't Buy It on Amazon" stickers) and urged fans to refuse to purchase anything from Amazon until the conflict is resolved in a fair way. On the July 21 episode, Colbert repeated the experiment, asking Lepucki for a recommendation of another Hachette author. Lepucki gave the nod to Stephan Eirik Clark who authored Sweetness #9.
