= Litquake =

Annual literary festival (previously Litstock)

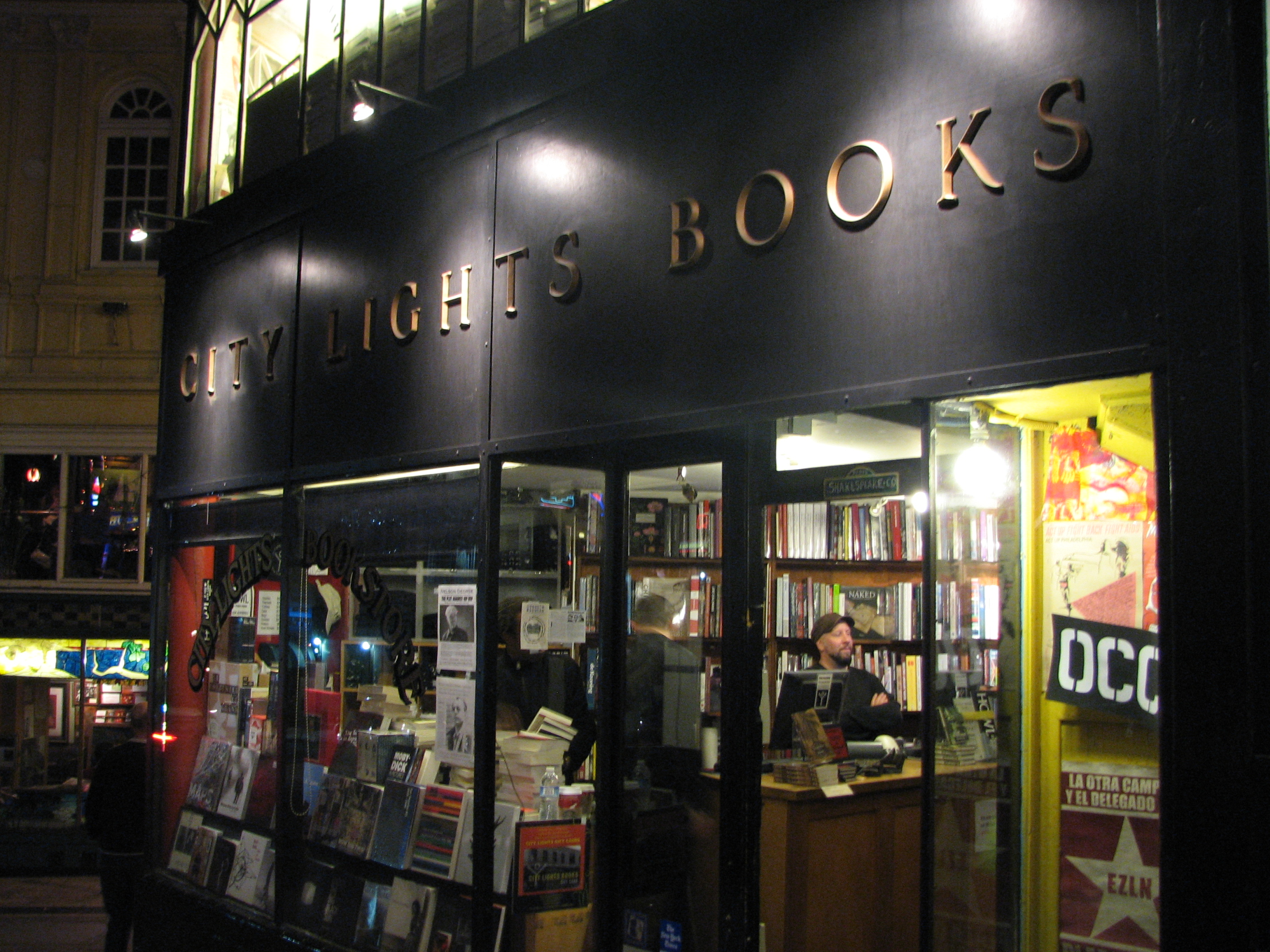
The City Lights Bookstore, one of the event venues

Litquake is San Francisco's annual literary festival. Originally named Litstock, the festival events took place in a single day in Golden Gate Park in the spring of 1999. It now has a two-week run in mid-October, as well as year-round programs and workshops.

Litquake consists of readings, discussions, film screenings, and themed events held at hundreds of Bay Area venues, in an attempt to bring as many disparate types of literary art to as many people as possible. The festival now features over 100 events and around 600 authors, and draws over 21,000 attendees annually. In 2021, 96% of all events were free and open to the public.

== History ==
Jack Boulware and Jane Ganahl are the co-founders and operate the festival as Executive Director and Artistic Director.

Hatched over beers at the Edinburgh Castle pub in 1999, Litquake debuted as "Litstock" a free one-day reading series in a fog-bound Golden Gate Park. In 2002, the festival was rechristened Litquake and began expanding its programming to include writing from around the world. In 2004, the festival inaugurated a closing night literary pub crawl (Lit Crawl) throughout San Francisco's Mission District.

In the years following, Litquake added more national and international authors, youth programs (Kidquake), workshops for the elderly (Elder Project), a podcast (Lit Cast Live), and special localized editions of the Lit Crawl held each year in Austin, Seattle, Minneapolis, New York City, Los Angeles, Portland, Boston, Chicago, Kells (Ireland), Cheltenham (England), Angers (France), Naples (Italy), and Wellington (New Zealand) with more being added every year.

Litquake is now the largest independent literary festival on the West Coast.

Litquake began hosting online programs in 2020.

== Notable author appearances ==
- Chris Adrian
- Hilton Als
- Daniel Alarcón
- Isabel Allende
- Rabih Alameddine
- Jonathan Ames
- Nicholson Baker
- Elif Batuman
- Peter S. Beagle
- Lewis Black
- Michael Ian Black
- T.C. Boyle
- NoViolet Bulawayo
- Michael Chabon
- Vikram Chandra
- Jeff Chang
- Emma Cline
- Natalie Diaz
- Emma Donoghue
- John Doe
- Steve Earle
- Dave Eggers
- James Ellroy
- Akwaeke Emezi
- Jeffrey Eugenides
- Lawrence Ferlinghetti
- Ben Fong-Torres
- Karen Joy Fowler
- John Freeman
- Mary Gaitskill
- Julia Glass
- Andrew Sean Greer
- Yaa Gyasi
- Robert Haas
- Chelsea Handler
- Daniel Handler (Lemony Snicket)
- Joy Harjo
- Chinaka Hodge
- Juan Felipe Herrera
- Adam Johnson
- Denis Johnson
- Piper Kerman
- Warren Hinckle
- Maxine Hong Kingston
- Chuck Klosterman
- Michael Krasny
- Rachel Kushner
- Victor LaValle
- Yiyun Li
- Tao Lin
- Édouard Louis
- Jonathan Lethem
- Ray Manzarek
- Armistead Maupin
- Marc Maron
- Joyce Maynard
- Michael McClure
- Thomas McGuane
- Christopher Moore
- Maggie Nelson
- Joyce Carol Oates
- Chinelo Okparanta
- ZZ Packer
- Raj Patel
- Tom Perrotta
- Anne Perry
- Michael Pollan
- D.A. Powell
- Boots Riley
- Mary Roach
- Karen Russell
- Ishmael Reed
- Sonia Sanchez
- George Saunders
- Adam Savage
- Will Self
- Jane Smiley
- Patti Smith
- Tracy K. Smith
- Rebecca Solnit
- Ron Stallworth
- Susan Straight
- Amber Tamblyn
- Amy Tan
- Michelle Tea
- Jose Antonio Vargas
- Loudon Wainwright III
- Tom Waits
- Esmé Weijun Wang
- Irvine Welsh
- Colson Whitehead
- Tobias Wolff
- Al Young

== Events ==
=== Lit Crawl ===
In 2004, Litquake launched its first “Lit Crawl,” a literary pub-crawl through the Mission District of San Francisco. Readings and performances were rolled out in three sequential phases over the course of the crawl. In 2005, the crawl closed the festival, a place in the schedule it has maintained ever since. By 2018 the Lit Crawl had expanded to over 100 venues, including bars, cafes, bookstores, theaters, galleries, clothing boutiques, furniture showrooms, parking lots, a laundromat and a bee-keeping store.

The New York Times wrote about the crawl in "In San Francisco, Literature as Carnival" and again in 2013 in an article entitled "A Heady Cocktail of Books and Booze" about Lit Crawl in New York City's Lower East Side.

Other crawls have been added over the years: Lit Crawl NYC debuted in 2008; Lit Crawl Austin in 2011 as a part of Texas Book Festival; Lit Crawl Brooklyn and Lit Crawl Seattle in 2012. Lit Crawl Iowa City and Lit Crawl Los Angeles 2013. Lit Crawl London, Lit Crawl Portland (Portland Book Festival), and Lit Crawl Boston (Boston Book Festival) was added in 2014. Since 2015, Lit Crawl NYC is a project of Litquake and PEN America, a global community of more than 4,400 writers, translators, and literary professionals dedicated to protecting free expression and promoting literary culture.

=== Kidquake ===
The annual Kidquake events bring over 800 K-5 students from 34 classes to the San Francisco Public Library for two days of assemblies and workshops with acclaimed children’s authors, and hundreds of free books and giveaways.

In 20202, Litquake released "virtual classroom visit" videos direct to teachers for use in the classroom. These pre-recorded videos featured authors' presentations paired with writing, illustration, and book-making prompts. Teaching materials were made available for download.

=== Teenquake ===
Teenquake partnerships with San Francisco Public Library, NaNoWriMo Young Writer’s Project, and Writopia Labs inspire young writers through public readings and open mics, literary crawls, and awards events. 2018’s Teen Writing Awards brought in 225 entries with ten of the teens featured at an awards ceremony for family and friends during Lit Crawl SF.

=== Elder Project ===
The Elder Project brings writing and storytelling workshops to retirement communities across Oakland and San Francisco. After two months of opening new pathways to self-expression and greater socialization, each class publishes an anthology and performs at a live reading for friends and loved ones. The program has even helped several emerging writers to publish their work, perform in local reading series, and even launch careers.

=== Lit Cast Live! ===
Lit Cast brings select Litquake programming to listeners in over 100 countries,. In 2018, through partnerships with local bookstores and arts organizations, Litquake began broadcasting authors on book tours, as well as various special events.

== Barbary Coast Award ==
Initiated in 2007, Litquake’s Barbary Coast Award is given for literary achievement and in recognition of those who value the independent—and sometimes unruly—the spirit of the Bay Area and keep it alive in their work. Its name is meant to evoke San Francisco’s storied pirate and nonconformist beginnings as well as a nod to Armistead Maupin’s quixotic characters who made their home on Barbary Lane. Recipients through 2016:

- 2007: Armistead Maupin
- 2008: Tobias Wolff
- 2009: Amy Tan
- 2010: Lawrence Ferlinghetti/City Lights Books
- 2011: Ishmael Reed
- 2012: Poetry Flash
- 2013: Ron Turner & Last Gasp Comics
- 2014: 826 Valencia with Dave Eggers and Vendela Vida
- 2015: Community of Writers at Squaw Valley
- 2016: Maxine Hong Kingston, Alejandro Murguia, Thomas Sanchez, Jewelle Gomez, Michael Krasny, The Threepenny Review, The Bancroft Library, Paul Yamazaki, and Justin Chin.

== See also ==
- List of San Francisco Bay Area writers
