= The Internet Ruined My Life =

American reality television series

- Theme music composer: Craig Dodge; Michael Harrison
- Country of origin: United States
- Original language: English
- No. of seasons: 1
- No. of episodes: 6

Production
- Producers: Adam Davis; Ken Druckerman; Jerry Kolber; Banks Tarver
- Cinematography: Jeremy Gould
- Editors: Giacomo Ambrosini; Max Heller
- Running time: 30 minutes
- Production companies: Atomic Entertainment; Left/Right Productions

Original release
- Network: Syfy
- Release: March 9 – April 13, 2016

The Internet Ruined My Life is an American reality television series that was made by Atomic Entertainment and Left/Right Productions for the Syfy Network in the United States that "exposes the unexpected perils of living in a social media-obsessed world".

The first season consisting of six episodes began airing on March 9, 2016, and concluded April 13, 2016.

== Plot ==
This show profiles different people whose lives have been severely impacted by Internet technology and social media.

== Episodes ==
Each half-hour episode is split into two segments telling two different stories.

No.	Title	Original release date	US viewers (millions)
1	"#CancelColbert"	March 9, 2016	0.47
Segment 1 (#CancelColbert): A Korean-American writer and activist growing up in Chicago, Illinois named Suey Park often spoke against racism. When Stephen Colbert made a joke on his talk show The Colbert Report, some people mistook the joke as being racist. Suey was already aware that the series was a very popular late-night talk and news satire television program, but she still wanted to offer an olive branch disgusted by the joke and took it literally... mostly, other Asian-American activists. She decided to take the matter in her own hands and stand with those who found the joke offensive, by posting a Tweet with the hashtag #CancelColbert. Although she did not really want the series cancelled, she thought that something over the top would get a point across. However, little did she know that her post involving the hashtag would cause her life to spiral out of control, attracting a large number of haters. After being interviewed on HuffPost Live, where people thought she said white men do not have a right to hold any opinion, things got worse for her, up to the point where she was doxxed, and had to hide for her own safety after a sniper was sighted outside her house. Following the incident, Suey fled to New York, where she was still targeted by many. Now, she no longer participates in social media. Segment 2 (Terrorist for a Tweet): Londoner Leigh Van Bryan was looking forward to visit the United States for the first time. He posted on Twitter saying that he was going to "destroy" America, which is described as British slang for partying and having a good time. But the United States Department of Homeland Security took his tweet literally, and once Leigh and his friend Emily made it to the United States, they were suddenly accused of being terrorists. Also, because their visas got canceled while they were in mid-flight, they were seen as illegal immigrants. This caused them to spend the night in jail despite the claims of Leigh and Emily. They were released after the Department of Homeland Security identified the figure of speech and were allowed to return to the United Kingdom. Leigh loved American culture and it was heartbreaking for him and Emily to learn that they were no longer allowed to visit the nation.
2	"Food Fight"	March 16, 2016	0.42
Segment 1 (Food Fight): An executive chef of a restaurant named Mark was a person who succeeded on both personal and professional levels. He had a loving girlfriend and a seven-year-old daughter. However, things turned out for the worse when he fought with an animal rights activist woman from another state on Facebook who was insulting practices of serving foie gras and veal at the restaurant he worked at, even though she had never been to that eatery. After defending one of his own in the culinary industry, the woman threatened his daughter and Mark himself. He was so upset that she made threats to his own child that he said some nasty things to the woman. But then, the woman deleted everything she said about Mark and she took a screenshot as "proof" to make everyone think that he was the only one saying bad things. Then, many overwhelmingly negative reviews suddenly started popping up and this problem nearly cost him his job and nearly threatened to ruin his own career from the claims that he was a misogynist chef who hates vegetarians. Since the incident, Mark is now more careful about what he does on social media. Segment 2 (#GamerGate): Game designer Brianna Wu faces backlash and hundreds of threats after she had made a post on Twitter about the "misogynistic" representation of women in the video game industry. After Brianna was doxxed for the things she said on Facebook and Twitter, both she and her husband felt that they would no longer be safe in their own home and chose to temporarily relocate to various hotels as a means of refuge. There have not been any prosecutions against the people that threatened Brianna. While being emotionally shaken by this experience, Brianna still continues to speak out against "misogyny" in the gaming industry.
3	"Sext Gone Wrong"	March 23, 2016	0.38
Segment 1 (#PissOlympics): A lover of social media and shock value pulls a prank that became a national twisted event. Cameron Jankowski hears of Piss Olympics, a new Internet trend, and was feeling "inspired" to take participation. He decided to film a video of himself urinating on an order of nachos during his day working at Taco Bell as his job, and then uploaded it on Twitter. The video received many likes, but there was one entity that did not like the video, the FBI. An Anonymous member contacted Cameron to point out that what he did was a level 6 felony violation on federal law in the United States food regulation, which could give him a 20 year sentence to jail towards breaching that law. He then got arrested, interrogated, and faced federal jail time due to his actions being a threat to public safety (urinating on food is a health hazard since he worked at a fast food restaurant). After taking a lie detector test, it turned out that it was only Mountain Dew. Aside from being questioned by the FBI, he also received death threats online. He also lost his job and was unable to find work for months. This incident has marred Cameron's presence on social media. Segment 2 (Sext Gone Wrong): Allyson Pereira was a high school student who loved her boyfriend and wanted to grow up and get married, but her heart sunk when her boyfriend broke up with her. Days later, her ex-boyfriend would tell her to send a topless picture to him. She did so when she thought it would get her and him back together. But her life forever changed when her ex-boyfriend started sending the picture to her other friends before she found out. Almost everyone saw the image and Allyson was bullied and harassed, not to mention how embarrassed she felt after sending the picture. This was enough to cause Allyson to consider committing suicide. With help from counseling and the support of her family, Allyson has recovered from this incident.
4	"Adults Only"	March 30, 2016	0.47
Segment 1 (Adults Only): Following her divorce, a college professor named Annmarie Chiarini has started dating again. A problem ensues in her new relationship where her boyfriend started to become aggressive and verbally abusive, while her ex-boyfriend started posting naked photos of Annmarie on the Internet which she did not want to have released. Having her naked pictures uploaded to the public without her consent has caused her to be stalked, humiliated, and ridiculed. Although she considered committing suicide, her love for her mother and children kept her going. She then took part with other women to establish the Cyber Civil Rights Initiative, which provides resources and information to the public about revenge postings. Since the incident, Annmarie has fought back against the revenge postings. Segment 2 (Beauty and the Meme): Ashley Vanpevenage prepared for a party by getting her makeup done. After posting before and after photos, the Internet went wild where Ashley met harsh criticism. This caused her to be mocked in real life and be bullied on social media. With the support of her father, who wrote about his love and pride for her daughter, Ashley regained her confidence and spoke out against her commentators and cyber-bullies. Her response video received over 1 million hits on YouTube, and she has since been interviewed by her local news and other shows where she addressed cyber-bullying.
5	"Gleek Tragedy"	April 6, 2016	0.38
Segment 1 (Gleek Tragedy): Nicole Crowther is an actress with high potential, who also happens to be a fan of the TV show Glee. When she was cast as an extra on the show, her career ended very quickly before it actually begun; when she talked about the Season 2 finale about what characters should be named Prom King and Prom Queen, most people took this comment out as a spoiler. Upon the various death threats that Nicole received, her father ended up hiring a bodyguard to keep her safe. Even the executive producers of Glee voiced their displeasure about this, to the point where background actors now need to sign strict confidentiality contracts while onset. Following the incident, Nicole left the acting business and moved back in with her family, where she manages the social media accounts of her family's company Crowther Roofing. Segment 2 (Emoj-ency): Sierra McCurdy was always active on social media, where she commented about pop culture and other news. When she commented on Facebook about two police officers that were killed in her hometown, she stated that she accidentally clicked the laughing emoji instead of the crying emoji. As a result, she received death threats and several attack posts against her. Sierra had apologized to the families of the cops, while voicing her condolences to them, but unfortunately, the harsh criticism did not subside. Someone revealed Sierra's information online shortly afterwards. Her birth date, her Social Security number, her vehicle identification number and her employee tag number were all shown publicly and everyone eventually found out that she was working at a Subway restaurant. Later, her car was run off the road in her hometown upon being labeled as a "cop hater" all over what happened online. Soon enough, Sierra and her family had to go into hiding. McCurdy's younger brother was arrested in the middle of the night when he tried to stand up for Sierra and threaten those who were threatening her. Some people in her hometown to this day still give off bad vibes near Sierra.
6	"Video Villain"	April 13, 2016	0.41
Segment 1 (Video Villain): An actress with high potential named Jennifer Box moved to Los Angeles to pursue her modeling and acting career. She took part in a prank video called "Drunk Girl" on YouTube. In this video, she pretends to be drunk and hopes if "random men" (who were actors) would get her home safely. Unfortunately, cyberspace took it out of context as many thought that it was actually making fun of rape, and Jennifer and all the men involved in the video got attacked on social media. Many news outlets and national discussions were then made towards the video regarding irresponsibility in the prank culture. Jennifer found out that the producers of the prank video were purposely making the men involved look bad and had the intention to want to make the video viral. Millions of people online have pointed their fingers at Jennifer, blaming her for the damages and claiming that she was responsible for making the entire video, even though she was not the producer. She only signed up to star in the video and was doing her job and got paid to be in it. On the streets, however, Jennifer encountered people yelling and threatening her for how they perceived her for making a careless decision to appear in the video. Her brother moved to Los Angeles to help her, but the attacks online towards her were so bad that she began to chain smoke, which led to her being hospitalized for a collapsed lung. It was so bad that she ended up moving back to her hometown in Texas, with her modeling and acting career ruined entirely. After all the heat, she is now organizing her life back to normal shape, with the help of her loving family. Segment 2 (A Writer Wronged): Christopher Hermelin is a writer from New York who can type short stories very fast. He sat at the park with a typewriter and would write stories for onlookers with the intention to earn money, while also improving his writing skills at the same time. But someone secretly got a picture of him and his typewriter, which eventually went viral on the Internet. He discovered the image on the front page of Reddit. Cyberbullies have been given abusive tools to work with from the picture, and they began to attack him to no end, pointing out that he only used the typewriter for an ironic aesthetic and making the claim that he was merely seeking attention in his endeavor. Everything in the image was ridiculed, especially certain parts that would not be criticized were also bantered with. Then the next day, another copy of the picture appeared on the front page of the website, but it was turned into a meme with a typical Internet meme caption. It only got worse and very violent when someone threatened to smash the typewriter over his head. All of this impacted Christopher's life for the worse and, as a result, he has hid away for the sake of his livelihood and safety. Afterwards, he decided to not look back and go back to doing what he enjoys doing. In the end, nobody attacked him physically, and he got to live peacefully once more and resumed his career.
