= Terdiman =

Terdiman is a surname. Notable people with the surname include:

- Daniel Terdiman, American journalist
- Jayson Terdiman (born 1988), American luger
