= Louis B. Jones =

American author and essayist

Louis B. Jones is an American author and essayist. He has written five novels, the first three of which were named New York Times Notable Books of their respective years. His third novel, California's Over, was named the Los Angeles Times' Best Book of the Year in 1997. He is a National Endowment for the Arts fellow and a fellow of the MacDowell Colony, and was a regular reviewer for The New York Times Book Review. Amy Tan has called Jones "one of the best minds of our generation".

He has served as visiting writer at a number of colleges around the country, and is currently the co-director of the fiction workshops for the Community of Writers.

== Bibliography ==
- Ordinary Money, 1990
- Particles and Luck, 1995
- California's Over, 1997
- Radiance, 2011
- Innocence, 2013
