= The Year of Getting to Know Us =

- Theatrical release poster
- Directed by: Patrick Sisam
- Screenplay by: Patrick Sisam; Rick Velleu
- Based on: "Star Food" and "The Year of Getting to know Us" by Ethan Canin
- Produced by: Holly Wiersma
- Starring: Jimmy Fallon; Sharon Stone; Tom Arnold; Illeana Douglas; Lucy Liu
- Cinematography: Lisa Rinzler
- Edited by: Susan Shipton; David Codron
- Music by: John Swihart
- Production companies: Ring Productions; Inferno
- Distributed by: Capitol Films
- Release date: January 24, 2008 (Sundance)
- Running time: 90 minutes
- Country: United States
- Language: English

The Year of Getting to Know Us is a 2008 American comedy-drama film directed by Patrick Sisam and written by Sisam and Rick Velleu, based on the short stories "Star Food" and "The Year of Getting to Know Us" by Ethan Canin. It stars Jimmy Fallon, Sharon Stone, Tom Arnold, Illeana Douglas, and Lucy Liu. It premiered on January 24, 2008 at the Sundance Film Festival.

== Premise ==
Christopher Rocket is a man loyal to his work but unable to fulfill his girlfriend Anne or anything else in his personal life. He came back to his hometown after his estranged father Ron Rocket suffers a stroke. Jane Rocket, his mother, is a central figure in his dysfunctional past.

However, once freed completely from his past demons, Christopher is finally able to commit.

== Cast ==
- Jimmy Fallon as Christopher Rocket
  - Chase Ellison as Young Christopher Rocket
- Sharon Stone as Jane Rocket
- Tom Arnold as Ron Rocket
- Illeana Douglas as Christine Jacobson
- Lucy Liu as Anne
- Paul Spicer as Security Guard

== Reception ==
On Variety, Justin Chang wrote that "a mere plot summary tells you everything you need to know about The Year of Getting to Know Us, an anemic grab-bag of Sundance [Film Festival] cliches." On The Hollywood Reporter, Stephen Farber wrote that "the film opens with a heavy dose of voice-over narration, always a sign of failed writing. As the film continues, it devolves into yet another dysfunctional family saga, drenched in forced whimsy and soggy platitudes."
