= California (novel) =

Novel by Edan Lepucki

- First edition book cover
- Author: Edan Lepucki
- Language: English
- Publication place: United States
- Media type: Print, e-book, audiobook
- ISBN: 978-0-316-25081-8

California is a novel by American author Edan Lepucki described as "post-apocalyptic dystopian fiction", in which characters Frida and Cal flee Los Angeles to live in the wilderness of post-apocalyptic California. The novel rose to prominence after Stephen Colbert urged his viewers to pre-order copies of the book from sellers other than Amazon.com – part of an ongoing dispute between the online bookseller and Colbert's own publisher, the Hachette Book Group. On 21 July 2014, Colbert announced that the novel would debut on The New York Times Best Seller list at number 3.

== Plot ==
Main characters Frida Ellis and Calvin Friedman are young lovers who, having fled a nearly-destroyed Los Angeles, are living in an abandoned house in Northern California as subsistence foragers and farmers. Wealthier survivors live in "Communities" with internet access, private security, and other luxuries.

The couple leave their home when Frida discovers she is pregnant. The protagonists abandon their former lives and seek the support of a community in which to raise their child. The couple struggle to decide whether or not to tell their new community about Frida's pregnancy which might sway a communal vote to determine if the couple should be allowed to stay.

== The "Colbert Bump" ==
"We're going to prove that I can sell more books than Amazon."

— Stephen Colbert, The Colbert Report, 4 June 2014

On June 4, 2014, Colbert used his television show, The Colbert Report, to satirically attack bookseller Amazon over the company's decision to remove particular titles from sale, including books from the publisher of Colbert's own three books, the Hachette Book Group. Colbert retaliated by encouraging his viewers to pre-order copies of California, published by Hachette subsidiary Little, Brown, from independent retailer Powell's Books to demonstrate its popularity.

The title was subsequently reviewed by national US papers including The Boston Globe, The Washington Post, The New York Times and the Los Angeles Times. The New York Times suggested that Lepucki had "won the literary Lotto".

From plans for an initial print run of 12,000 copies, Hachette upped its inventory to 60,000 copies. The book became "one of the most preordered debut titles in Hachette history". Lepucki spent three days signing 10,000 copies at Powell's headquarters.

== Reception ==
The novel received generally positive reviews, though many reviewers pointed out that the book might not have otherwise received national attention had it not been for Colbert's campaign against Amazon, thus "subjecting this modest post-apocalyptic tale to intense scrutiny". The Boston Globe, though, called the novel "a mostly solid first book". The Washington Post suggested specific elements (including Lepucki's plot twist) were "thrilling" and "amusing".

The New York Post included the book in its "29 best books of the summer" and the Orlando Weekly listed it in its "2014 Summer Guide".

== See also ==
- Cultural impact of The Colbert Report
