= Tanaquil Le Clercq =

French-American ballerina (1929–2000)

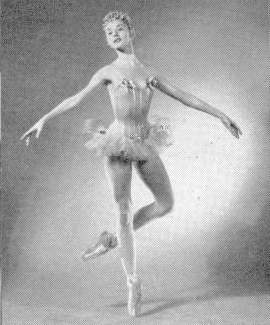
- Le Clercq as Dewdrop of the Candy Flowers in The Nutcracker, 1954
- Born: October 2, 1929; Paris, France
- Died: December 31, 2000 (aged 71); Manhattan, New York, U.S.
- Occupation: Ballet dancer
- Spouse: George Balanchine (m. 1952; div. 1969)

Tanaquil Le Clercq (/lɛkˈlɛər/ lek-LAIR; October 2, 1929 – December 31, 2000) was an American ballet dancer, born in Paris, France, who became a principal dancer with the New York City Ballet at the age of nineteen. Her dancing career ended abruptly when she was stricken with polio in Copenhagen during the company's European tour in 1956. Eventually regaining most of the use of her arms and torso, she remained paralyzed from the waist down for the rest of her life.

== Life and career ==
Le Clercq was the daughter of Jacques Georges Clemenceau Le Clercq, a European American intellectual, professor of French at Queens College in the 1950s-early 1970s, and his American wife, Edith (née Whittemore), who were married on June 28, 1928. Tanaquil studied ballet with Mikhail Mordkin before auditioning for the School of American Ballet in 1941, where she won a scholarship.

When Le Clercq was fifteen years old, famed choreographer George Balanchine asked her to perform with him in a dance he choreographed for a polio charity benefit. In an eerie portent of things to come, he played a character named Polio, and Le Clercq was his victim who became paralyzed and fell to the floor. Then, children tossed dimes at her character, prompting her to get up and dance again.

She was considered Balanchine's first ballerina: she was trained in his style from childhood and she was one of his most important muses, together with dancers such as Maria Tallchief and, later on, Suzanne Farrell. Le Clercq became a principal dancer with the New York City Ballet at the age of nineteen. During her tenure with the company, Balanchine, Jerome Robbins, and Merce Cunningham all created roles for her.

Le Clercq's dancing career ended abruptly when she contracted polio in Copenhagen during the company's European tour in 1956. Eventually regaining most of the use of her arms and torso, she remained paralyzed from the waist down for the rest of her life.

She reemerged as a dance teacher and as one student recalled, "used her hands and arms as legs and feet." She taught at Dance Theater of Harlem from 1974 to 1982.

== Legacy ==
Le Clercq's life and career are profiled in the 2013 documentary film, Afternoon of a Faun: Tanaquil Le Clercq. Novelist Varley O'Connor created a fictional account of the relationship between Tanaquil LeClercq and George Balanchine in The Master's Muse (Scribner 2012). In 2021, Orel Protopopescu, a former student of Le Clercq's father, published Dancing Past the Light: The Life of Tanaquil Le Clercq (University Press of Florida), the first biography of Le Clercq.

== Personal life ==
Tanaquil Le Clercq was the fourth and last wife (1952–1969) of Balanchine, the pioneer of American ballet. He obtained a quick divorce from her to woo Suzanne Farrell (who refused Balanchine's marriage proposal and went on to marry another Balanchine dancer, Paul Mejia).

Le Clercq died of pneumonia in New York Hospital at the age of 71.
