= Phillip Barron =

American poet and philosopher

- Education: University of Massachusetts, Amherst (BA); University of North Carolina at Chapel Hill (MA, Philosophy); San Francisco State University (MFA); University of Connecticut (PhD, Philosophy)
- Occupations: Poet, Professor
- Writing career
- Genre: Poetry
- Notable awards: 2019 Nicolas Guillen Outstanding Book Award from the Caribbean Philosophical Association

Phillip Barron is an American poet and philosopher who teaches at Lewis & Clark College in Portland, Oregon. His poetry has won the Nicolás Guillén Outstanding Book Award for philosophical literature and has been featured in many national journals including The Brooklyn Rail, New American Writing, and Janus Head: Journal of Interdisciplinary Studies in Literature, Continental Philosophy, Phenomenological Psychology, and the Arts. Barron also has a PhD in Philosophy from the University of Connecticut.

What Comes from a Thing has been described by reviewers as "a masterpiece of phenomenological description in which poetry is not application or a technique for profundity but instead at the heart of philosophical/poetic evocation" and as "laments of postindustrial despair, isolation, and ecological ruin." Through both poetry and philosophy, Barron challenges traditional conceptions of personal identity, reframing identity as a distributed phenomenon "that comes through the tension between the artificial and the untouched."

He was the founding editor of the poetry journal OccuPoetry, an online literary journal which documented poetry and art of the Occupy Movement. He is a member of the Community of Writers poetry workshop, and he edited the 2012 issue of the Squaw Valley Review.

Barron has been cited as an expert on sexism and capital punishment for a 2000 article titled "Gender Discrimination in the US Death Penalty System". In 2013, he appeared on a HuffPost Live segment on gender discrimination in the death penalty.

== Awards and honors ==
- 2019 Nicolás Guillén Outstanding Book Award
- 2015 Michael Rubin Book Award
- 2001-02 Davis-Putter Scholarship

== Published works ==
=== Poetry ===
Bright Leaf (Horse and Buggy Press, 2022)

What Comes from a Thing (Fourteen Hills Press, 2015)

=== Prose ===
The Outspokin' Cyclist (Avenida Books, 2011)
