= Carry Me Across the Water =

2001 novel by Ethan Canin

- First edition
- Author: Ethan Canin
- Language: English
- Genre: Novel
- Publisher: Random House
- Publication date: 2001
- Publication place: United States
- Media type: Print (hardback)
- Pages: 206 pp
- ISBN: 0-679-45679-1
- OCLC: 45284641
- Dewey Decimal: 813/.54 21
- LC Class: PS3553.A495 C37 2001

Carry Me Across the Water is a novel by the American writer Ethan Canin.

It is an elegiac novel that tells the story of August Kleinman, a 78-year-old former Pittsburgh brewery owner who remembers episodes from his life—from his escape from Nazi Germany to his life of poverty in New York to his rise to riches in industrial Pittsburgh. Both the Boston Globe and The Times selected it as a Best Book of 2001.
