= Lisa Goldstein =

American writer

- Goldstein at World Fantasy Convention 2026
- Born: Elizabeth Joy Goldstein; November 21, 1953 (age 72); Los Angeles, California, U.S.
- Education: University of California, Los Angeles
- Occupation: Novelist
- Spouse: Douglas A. Asherman (m. 1986)
- Writing career
- Pen name: Isabel Glass
- Language: English
- Genres: Fantasy, science fiction
- Notable awards: National Book Award; Mythopoeic Award; Sidewise Award
- Website: brazenhussies.net/Goldstein

Lisa Goldstein (born Elizabeth Joy Goldstein on November 21, 1953) is an American fantasy and science fiction writer whose work has been nominated for Nebula, Hugo, and World Fantasy Awards. Her 1982 novel The Red Magician won a National Book Award in the one-year category Original Paperback and was praised by Philip K. Dick shortly before his death. Her 2011 novel, The Uncertain Places, won the 2012 Mythopoeic Fantasy Award for Adult Literature, and her short story, "Paradise Is a Walled Garden," won the 2011 Sidewise Award for Best Short-Form Alternate History.

== Biography ==
Goldstein's father was Heinz Jurgen "Harry" Goldstein (June 8, 1922, in Krefeld, Germany – May 24, 1974, in Los Angeles), a survivor of Bergen-Belsen concentration camp; her mother, Miriam Roth (April 8, 1922, in Mukachevo, Czechoslovakia – October 12, 2011, in Los Angeles), survived the extermination camp Auschwitz. Her parents came to the United States in 1947 and met in an ESL class.

She has written two high fantasy novels, Daughter of Exile and The Divided Crown, under the pen name "Isabel Glass". Her publisher recommended a pseudonym because they differ so much from her other work. "Isabel" is from Point Isabel Regional Shoreline, a local park which includes a dog run. "Glass" fits the Tor Books standard for pseudonyms, short surnames in the first half of the alphabet.

She married Douglas A. Asherman in 1986, and lives in Oakland, California.

== Bibliography ==
=== Novels ===
- The Red Magician (1982)
- The Dream Years (1985)
- A Mask for the General (1987)
- Tourists (1989)
- Strange Devices of the Sun and Moon (1993)
- Summer King, Winter Fool (1994)
- Walking the Labyrinth (1996)
- Dark Cities Underground (1999)
- The Alchemist's Door (2002)
- Daughter of Exile (as Isabel Glass; 2004)
- The Divided Crown (illustrated by Kinuko Y. Craft) (as Isabel Glass; 2005)
- The Uncertain Places (2011)
- Weighing Shadows (2015)
- Ivory Apples (2019)

=== Collections ===
- Daily Voices (1989)
- Travellers in Magic (1994)

== Awards ==
- National Book Award (1983) for The Red Magician
- Sidewise Award for Alternate History (2011) for "Paradise is a Walled Garden"
- Mythopoeic Fantasy Award for Adult Literature (2012) for Uncertain Places

=== Nominations ===
- John W. Campbell Award for Best New Writer finalist (1983) for The Red Magician
- John W. Campbell Award for Best New Writer finalist (1984) for The Red Magician
- World Fantasy Award for Best Novel nominee (1986) for The Dream Years
- Hugo Award for Best Short Story nominee (1988) for "Cassandra's Photographs"
- Nebula Award for Best Short Story nominee (1988) for "Cassandra's Photographs"
- Arthur C. Clarke Award nominee (1990) for A Mask for the General
- World Fantasy Award for Best Short Story nominee (1993) for "Alfred"
- Nebula Award for Best Short Story nominee (1994) for "Alfred"
- World Fantasy Award for Best Collection nominee (1995) for Travellers In Magic
- Nebula Award for Best Short Story nominee (1996) for "The Narcissus Plague"
- World Fantasy Award for Best Short Story nominee (1998) for "Fortune and Misfortune"
- Nebula Award for Best Short Story nominee (1999) for "Fortune and Misfortune"
- Mythopoeic Fantasy Award for Adult Literature nominee (2000) for Dark Cities Underground
- Nebula Award for Best Novelette nominee (2009) for "Dark Rooms"

== See also ==
- List of San Francisco Bay Area writers
