= Stuart Canin =

American violinist and conductor (born 1926)

Stuart Canin (born April 5, 1926) is an American violinist and conductor. On December 30, 1936, at the age of 10, he performed on the Fred Allen radio hour. Afterwards, Fred Allen remarked "... a little fellow in the 5th grade, and already plays better than Jack Benny." This was the first volley in the famous Benny-Allen feud.

As an American GI, he performed for President Harry Truman, Winston Churchill, and Joseph Stalin at the Potsdam Conference. In 1959, he became the first American violinist to win the Paganini Competition.

== Life and career ==
Canin was born in New York City in 1926. He studied with Ivan Galamian at the Juilliard School. He taught music at the University of Iowa and Oberlin Conservatory, then served as concertmaster of the San Francisco Symphony (where he was appointed by Seiji Ozawa), the San Francisco Opera, and, from 2000 to 2010, of the Los Angeles Opera. When he retired from the LA Opera, its artistic director Plácido Domingo and music director James Conlon announced the endowment of a permanent "Stuart Canin Concertmaster Chair".

Canin was a founding member of the New Century Chamber Orchestra and served as its first music director, from 1992 to 1999.

Canin has also done studio work in Hollywood, including a violin-playing and speaking part in the Robert Altman film Short Cuts and violin work in film soundtracks, including Forrest Gump, Jurassic Park, and Schindler's List. He and his time in the army is featured in the documentary short The Rifleman's Violin. He also did studio work as a violinist for Paula Abdul.

Canin has two sons, both of whom are medical doctors: Aram Canin and novelist Ethan Canin.
