= Woman No. 17 =

2017 novel by Edan Lepucki

- First edition cover
- Author: Edan Lepucki
- Language: English
- Genre: Suspense fiction
- Publisher: Hogarth Press
- Publication date: 2017 (first edition)
- Publication place: United States
- Media type: Print
- Pages: 310 p.
- ISBN: 9781101904251
- OCLC: 1002253299

Woman No. 17 is a novel by American author Edan Lepucki published in 2017. It is Lepucki's second novel. Set in California it details the friendship between 40 something housewife Lady Daniels and her live-in nanny, S Fowler, who comes to help Lady with her younger son.

== Plot ==
Pearl "Lady" Daniels is a wealthy housewife living in the Hollywood Hills who is in the midst of a trial separation with her husband Karl, a television producer. After writing an article about her eldest son, Seth, who does not speak, Lady is given a book contract. She decides to hire a nanny to help with her youngest son and meets Esther "S" Fowler, a recent college graduate whom she immediately decides to hire based on the fact that she intuitively likes her.

S is an art minor who, after a failed final art project, left the Bay Area and moved in with her mother. S has switched her name from Esther Shapiro to S Fowler, using her mother's maiden name. She decides to turn herself into her mother as an art project and has a makeover to make herself more dowdy. S is fascinated by Lady's sister-in-law, Kitty Daniels, a photographer who once took a portrait of Lady as part of a series of photographs she took of women, called Woman No. 17.

Lady's work on her memoir is stagnating, but the work, and her relationship with S, causes her to reflect on her life at 22, when she was in a relationship with Seth's father, Marco, who convinced her not to have an abortion so that his dying mother could have a grandchild. Lady decided to go through with the pregnancy as a way to get away from her controlling mother, Simone. Simone later offered Marco $9000 to leave Lady and Seth which he accepted. Lady attributes Seth's silence to Simone's actions as Seth had said the word "There" before meeting Simone, and stopped speaking after witnessing Simone bribing Marco.

Karl informs Lady that Seth is interested in finding his biological father. This causes her to search Twitter where she discovers a man who might be him and attempts contact.

S begins a different phase of her art project where she asks strangers for pictures of their mothers in their youth. When the project is a bust Seth tweets out the request for pictures to his follower account. S ends up receiving a picture of Lady standing beside a man and she asks Seth why he sent it. He reveals he didn't and that he has never seen the picture of Lady which also includes his estranged father, Marco.

Lady discovers that Kit has been taking pictures of Seth which angers her deeply. She and Marco meet and she learns that Seth has a younger sister. At the meeting Lady and Marco have sex.

S and Seth, after a prolonged flirtation, begin having sex. S also slides further into alcoholism under the pretence of acting like her mother. One night she and Lady get drunk together and Lady shows her the original version of Woman No. 17 which she keeps in her closet. She reveals that this copy of the photo has been officially banned from being displayed because it shows a bottle of prenatal vitamins in Lady's room revealing that Karl is not actually Devin's biological father.

Seth reveals to S that through the picture Lady sent to S he has discovered Marco Green's twitter account and believes he is his father. S drives to meet him and they are surprised to see Lady there who has continued her affair with Marco. Seth is hurt to discover that Lady never told Marco that Seth doesn't speak. Seth leaves and S drives Lady home. On the way there Lady sees that Seth has sent her a tweet letting her know that he and S have had sex. Lady slaps S and fires her, putting out an ad for a new sitter.

S moves back in with her father and abandons her mother series instead creating a semi-successful show, Dick Pics, based on pictures of penises men have sent her.

Lady is invited to a screening of Seth's short film and she and Karl begin to reconcile. She abandons her book on Seth having decided that the story of his silence is not her story to tell.

== Characters ==
- Pearl "Lady" Daniels - a Hollywood Hills housewife
- Esther "S" Fowler - a child education graduate and nanny
- Karl Daniels - Lady's television producer husband
- Seth - Lady's mute teenage son born from her relationship with Marco
- Devin - Lady and Karl's toddler son
- Marco Green - Seth's father whom Seth and Lady are estranged from

== Reception ==
Critical reaction to the novel was positive. The New York Times was positive overall calling it "propulsive and moving" despite "occasional cracks in the narrative". The Washington Post called the novel "smart". Kirkus Reviews deemed the novel "[a]lways enjoyable if not always believable".
