= Robin Romm =

American writer

Robin Romm is an American writer of fiction and nonfiction books.

== Biography ==
Robin Romm was born in Eugene, Oregon. She attended Brown University, where she studied English literature and won the Barbara Banks Brodsky prize in fiction. After working as an employment discrimination investigator in San Francisco, CA for two years, she went back to school and received an MFA in creative writing from San Francisco State University. Her 2005 chapbook, The Tilt, was published by Fourteen Hills Press as the Michael Rubin Prize in Fiction. She published her first full-length collection of stories, The Mother Garden, with Scribner in 2007. She published her memoir, The Mercy Papers, with Scribner in 2010, which was a New York Times Notable Book of the Year and received an "A" from Entertainment Weekly.

She teaches for the low-residency MFA program at Warren Wilson College. She is a longtime staff member of the Community of Writers where she teaches in the fiction and nonfiction/memoir workshops.

She also writes book reviews for The New York Times.

== Personal life ==
Romm lives in Portland, Oregon. She is married with two children. Her husband, Don Waters, is also a writer and a professor.

== Bibliography ==
- 2005, The Tilt, ISBN 978-1889292069
- 2007, The Mother Garden: Stories, ISBN 978-1416539025
- 2009, The Mercy Papers: A Memoir of Three Weeks, ISBN 978-1416567882
- 2017, Double Bind: Women on Ambition, ISBN 978-1631491214
- 2017, It's What You Think (When You Think About Cheating), ISBN 978-1536640786
