= Lisa Tucker (author) =

American author

Lisa Tucker is an American author who is credited for three novels in young adult and adult fiction.

== Biography ==
She grew up in suburban communities near Kansas City and St. Louis, Missouri. She has toured the Midwest with a jazz band, worked as a waitress, writing teacher, computer programmer, and math professor. Tucker holds a graduate degree in English from the University of Pennsylvania and a graduate degree in math from Villanova University. Her short story works and novellas have appeared in national publications including Seventeen Magazine, The Oxford American, and The Philadelphia Inquirer. Tucker has appeared in national book clubs (including support from retailers such as Borders, Barnes & Noble, and Books-A-Million), CBS's Early Show, in public radio, and in syndicated television programs. When she is not writing, she sings jazz as a pastime. Tucker currently resides in New Mexico.

== Bibliography ==
- The Song Reader (Simon and Schuster, 2003)
- Shout Down the Moon (Simon and Schuster, 2004)
- Once Upon a Day (Atria Books, 2006)
- The Cure For Modern Life (Simon and Schuster, 2008)
- The Promised World (Atria, 2009))
- Played Nikki In Disney Channels Own Movie Love And Happiness (Clinton And Semore, 2009)
