= Wendy Newman =

American relationship expert, professional workshop leader and author

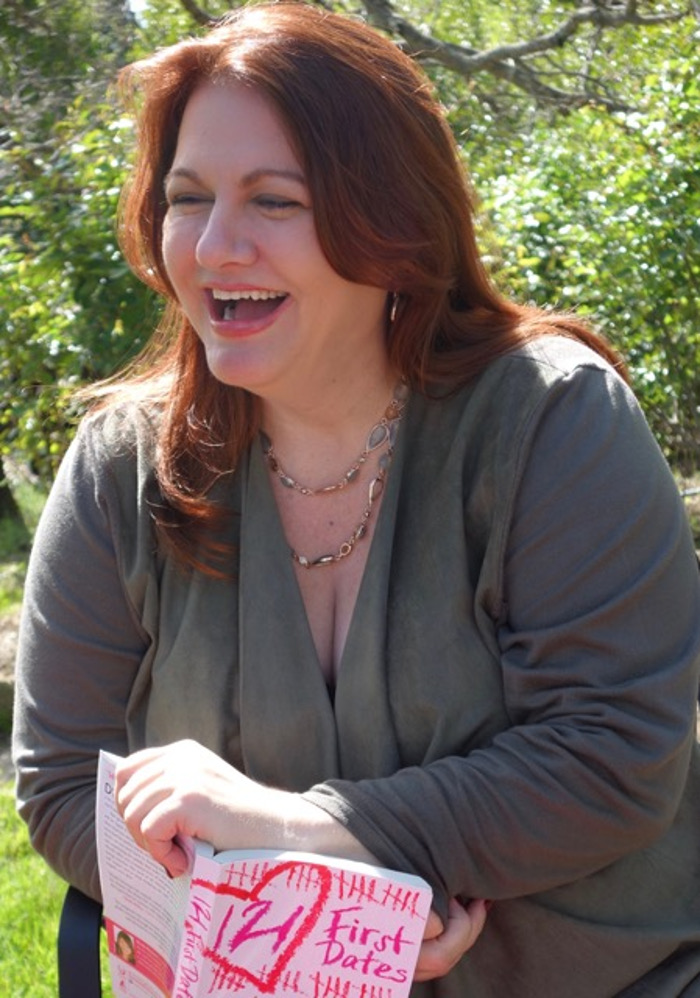
- Born: Wendy Ann Dimmitt; 1967 (age 58–59); Salt Lake City, Utah
- Education: American Sign Language
- Alma mater: Vista Community College
- Spouse: Dave Pierce (m. 2018)
- Writing career
- Years active: 14
- Genre: Interpersonal relationships
- Website: wendyspeaks.com

Wendy Newman (born 1967) is an American relationship expert, professional workshop leader, and author. Her relationship advice, often with other experts in the field, has been published in the Wall Street Journal, U.S. News & World Report, Salon magazine, Yahoo! Health, and Bustle magazine. Newman leads a variety of self-improvement workshops; her guidance is based upon her research which started in 2002 and continues today. Her freshman novel, 121 First Dates, details her personal experiences with dates, dating websites and ultimately finding her life partner.

== Life and career ==
Newman was born and raised in Salt Lake City, Utah and became a hotelier in 1986. In 1987 she relocated to San Francisco and for much of the 1990s, she was the general manager of Mary Elizabeth Inn, an 88-room residence for disenfranchised women. In the early 2000s, she incubated an Internet start-up, StaySonoma.com, a lodging accommodations company she sold in 2012.

Newman began her workshop-leading career at PAX Programs in 2002 before transitioning to leading her own material by 2006. Since then, she has led hundreds of relationship workshops to over 90,000 people. She received a certificate in American Sign Language (ASL) and Deaf Culture Studies from Vista Community College, Berkeley, California (1997).

=== 121 First Dates ===
Newman's blogging, which ultimately became 121 First Dates, began with "Date #54 - Keeping Up With Mr. Johnson" on May 8, 2010. Sharing her experiences with family and friends, she continued blogging, reasoning if she didn't end up with a partner, perhaps she might end up with a book. Her calendar contained the 53 earlier dates which she wrote from memory. The working title of the book at that time was, 101 First Dates: A Survival Guide For The Single Girl; Newman met her husband, Dave Pierce, on her 121st first date. A completed manuscript was already in editing at the time of meeting Pierce and was then rewritten from the perspective of a woman now in a committed relationship. Twenty-eight, first-date short-stories are included in 121 First Dates: How to Succeed at Online Dating, Fall in Love, and Live Happily Ever After (Really!).

Newman decided against self-publishing 121 First Dates. In connection with the publication, Newman has been interviewed by, Access Hollywood (NBC), the Wall Street Journal, the Washington Post (reprinted Chicago Tribune), The Huffington Post, Self magazine (reprinted in Glamor), and The Daily Free Press

121 First Dates has been reviewed by, Library Journal, Publishers Weekly, and Metro International.

== Real estate career ==
Newman is a licensed California real estate agent (DRE# 02159040) operating under Wesely & Associates Inc. (DRE# 01527306), with offices at 845 California Street, San Francisco. She serves clients in San Francisco and Nevada County, California, specializing in residential home sales and divorce real estate.

Newman holds the RCS-D designation (Real Estate Collaboration Specialist in Divorce), a credential issued to agents who specialize in collaboratively assisting clients navigating divorce-related real estate transactions.
