= Janis Cooke Newman =

American writer

- Citizenship: American
- Education: San Francisco State University (MFA)
- Writing career
- Notable works: Mary: Mrs. A. Lincoln, The Russian Word for Snow, A Master Plan for Rescue

Janis Cooke Newman is an American writer. She is known for her novels, Mary: Mrs. A. Lincoln (McAdam/Cage 2006, Harcourt 2007) and A Master Plan for Rescue (Riverhead 2015) as well as her memoir The Russian Word for Snow (St. Martin's Press 2001). She lives in San Francisco and is a long-time member of the San Francisco Writers’ Grotto, a member of The Castro Writers Coop, as well as the founder of the Lit Camp Writers’ Conference.

== Biography ==
Newman grew up in New Jersey and attended San Francisco State University, where she received an MFA in creative writing. She lives in San Francisco and has been a member of the San Francisco Writers’ Grotto since 2007. She has been on staff at the Community of Writers, the Lit Camp writers conference, and at the Book Passage Travel Writers Conference.

== Critical acclaim ==
Mary: Mrs. A. Lincoln was one of USA Today Best Books of 2006 and a Finalist (for First Fiction) for a Los Angeles Times Book Prize. Newman's work has been reviewed in USA Today and People Magazine, and her travel writing has appeared in the New York Times, the Los Angeles Times, and the San Francisco Chronicle.

== Bibliography ==
=== Novels ===
- Mary: Mrs. A. Lincoln (McAdam/Cage 2006, Harcourt 2007) ISBN 978-0-156-03347-3
- A Master Plan for Rescue (Riverhead 2015) ISBN 978-1-594-63361-4

=== Memoir ===
- The Russian Word for Snow (St. Martin's Press 2001) ISBN 978-0-312-28341-4

=== Travel writing ===
- "So many wineries, so little time" Los Angeles Times, June 4, 2013.
- "Hip little Tucson heats up" San Francisco Chronicle , May 5, 2013.
- "Nolita protects N.Y.'s neighborhood feel" San Francisco Chronicle , October 5, 2012.
- "Adelaide, Australia: On the hunt for an authentic dish" Los Angeles Times , August 12, 2012
- "Australia's Byron Bay - like traveling to 1973" San Francisco Chronicle , May 4, 2012.
- "Upgrading the Outback around Flinders Ranges" San Francisco Chronicle , March 18, 2012.
- "Missing Don Draper? Get mad about Madison Avenue" San Francisco Chronicle , August 14, 2011.
- "A culinary walk through Barcelona" Los Angeles Times , April 25, 2011.
- "Taking the Godfather Tour in Sicily" San Francisco Chronicle , January 16, 2011.
- "Barcelona by bike" San Francisco Chronicle , November 7, 2010.
- “In Sicily, a Step Back in Time” The New York Times , September 22, 2010.
- "Healdsburg: For foodies, a new northern star" Los Angeles Times , July 5, 2010.
- "Barbados makes the belly happy" Los Angeles Times, November 1, 2009.
- "In wine country, boccie and wine make a nice pairing" Los Angeles Times , June 1, 2008.
