= For Kings and Planets =

1999 novel by Ethan Canin

- First edition (publ. Random House)
- Author: Ethan Canin
- Publisher: Random House
- Publication date: September 1, 1998
- ISBN: 0-679-41963-2

For Kings and Planets is a 1999 novel by American author Ethan Canin.

The story centers around the friendship of two college students at Columbia University and follows them from their freshman year in 1974 to their adult lives in the late 1990s. Orno is a humble man from Missouri who gains entry to Columbia through his own strong work ethic. Soon after the school year starts, Orno befriends Marshall, a charismatic student from a wealthy New England family who has a photographic memory. At first, Orno is in awe of Marshall's abilities, and becomes jealous of him when he uses his talent to gain the attraction of women or easily skate through school. Eventually, Orno's view of Marshall becomes fractured when he learns about his history of mental illness, troubled family life, and many secrets.

Marshall soon drops out of college and moves to Los Angeles to work as a TV writer, and develops an addiction to cocaine. After starting a relationship with Marshall's sister, Simone, it is revealed that many impressive stories Marshall told Orno were fabricated. Orno drifts apart from Marshall, who is suggested to be a pathological liar. The friendship between the two crumbles on the eve of Orno's wedding to Simone, when Marshall invites an old girlfriend of Orno's as an apology for having an affair with her when they were in college, showing that he has become obsessed with the past when Orno has moved on. It is also revealed that Marshall's family is financially destitute despite their attempt to maintain the appearance of wealth. Marshall's father, who shares Marshall's photographic memory and tendency to lie drowns when the family goes out on their boat during a storm. After marrying Simone, Orno finds himself settling for mediocrity, finally realizing that he will never be like Marshall. Eventually, Orno leaves New York City with Simone for Maine and finds work as a dentist, a job he finds surprisingly fulfilling. The novel ends with the birth of Orno and Simone's first child, and the two talk fondly about Marshall.
