= The Samurai's Garden =

1994 novel by Gail Tsukiyama

- Author: Gail Tsukiyama
- Language: English
- Genre: Novel
- Publisher: St. Martin's Griffin
- Publication date: May 4, 1994
- Publication place: United States
- Media type: Print (paperback)
- Pages: 226
- ISBN: 978-0-312-14407-4

The Samurai's Garden is a 1994 novel by American author Gail Tsukiyama. Many consider it to be Tsukiyama's finest work, and an influential piece in Asian American literature. The Samurai's Garden is often included in required reading lists for high school students, and is considered to be a prime example of using effective figurative language.

== Synopsis ==
Twenty one year-old Stephen leaves his home in Hong Kong just as the Japanese are poised to further invade China, towards Hong Kong. He is sent to Tarumi, a small beach-side village in Japan, to recuperate from tuberculosis. There, he meets and develops friendships with three adults, Matsu, Kenzo, and Sachi, and a young girl, Keiko, who is his own age.

Keiko becomes his first love, but it can't be because she is Japanese and he is Chinese. The Japanese and Chinese were fighting a war at that time, and Keiko's family had prejudiced opinions about Chinese people (especially Keiko's father). Yet Keiko still sees Stephen. Then Keiko's brother eventually dies fighting for Japan, and that causes Keiko's father to develop extreme hatred for Stephen, as he is Chinese. Thus, Keiko cannot see Stephen anymore.

In addition, there is a bitter love triangle between Sachi, Kenzo, and Matsu. Sachi is now an old woman with leprosy. Lepers are forced into exile and are said to dishonor their family because of their disfigured bodies. Sachi says that society thinks of her as a monster, and these thoughts have obviously rubbed off on her self-concept. She always makes sure that no one can see the left side of her scarred face (the right side is unblemished and Stephen considers it the most beautiful face he has ever seen). Such beauty existing next to the scars shows that beauty is in everything. When Sachi was younger and "one of the most beautiful girls in Tarumi", she was engaged to Kenzo, a handsome boy who had promise for a great, successful future. But when Sachi got leprosy, Kenzo was too afraid to visit her in Yamaguchi because he didn't want to see what happened to her. He never realized it, but he had fallen in love with her beauty, and not her soul.

In order to keep in some contact in the later years with Sachi, Kenzo sent messages through his childhood friend, Matsu. Matsu is one of the main characters in this book and housed Stephen. Matsu was Stephen's grandfather's house keeper, and is a very understanding, quiet man. Matsu taught Stephen many lessons about honor, the cruelties of humanity, and what it is to love someone. Matsu was the only person who was truly there for Sachi, and over the years he and Sachi had started a simple, loving relationship. They attempted to have a child together, but it was stillborn. Also, Stephen's Baba (father) had an affair with a Japanese woman, and even gave money to his mistress. This tarnished Baba's reputation in Stephen's mind, and he felt betrayed by his father. Throughout the book there is an underlying sense of society being out place, what with their traditional ideas of honor and the fact that there was a war going on. The unwinding stories of his new friends, war, and family eventually bring him to the beginnings of wisdom, love, honor, and loss.

== Themes ==
At the core, The Samurai's Garden is a novel emphasizing the intrinsic themes of loyalty and honor found in Japanese culture. The complex relationship between Tsukiyama's characters, and the physical adversities and conflicts they face, ultimately hold the significance for the title of the novel. The author also alludes to one's ability to build upon life rather than mere acceptance.
