= A Prodigal in Love =

1894 novel by Emma Wolf

- Cover, first edition, 1894
- Author: Emma Wolf
- Language: English
- Subject: Home perplexities
- Genre: Romance novel
- Set in: San Francisco, California
- Publisher: Harper
- Publication date: 1894
- Publication place: United States
- Pages: 258

A Prodigal in Love was an American novel by Emma Wolf. Considered successful in its day, it was published in New York City by Harper in 1894. Set in San Francisco, California like Wolf's earlier novels, it told the story of home perplexities.

== Plot ==
In her first novel, Other Things Being Equal, Wolf dealt with a problem. In this one, she is content to tell a story. The Herriotts, with whom this story chiefly deals, are an orphaned family of six girls. Constance Herriott had been left in charge after her mother's death. All went smoothly until Hall Kenyon fell in love with one sister and married another. Constance played the part of mother to all her sisters, to none more so than to the sister who most injured her. Paris, Rome, and other European cities are traveled through and described.

The title of the book is an attractive but not a very happy one; and the reader is uncertain as to which of the four leading characters is really "A Prodigal in Love": the husband who dissipates his love upon his wife's sister, the wife who squanders her love upon her sister's lover, the man who gives his love to the woman who says she can never return it, or the woman who spends all her love upon those who are dependent upon it, and upon her. This last, the voluntary scapegoat of them all, a scapegoat actuated solely by altruism, with hardly a shadow of egoism in her composition, is perhaps the most loveable of all Wolf's creations, but the interest will center about the love-affairs of the prodigals who marry each other against their mutual wills.

== Characters ==
After the reader overcomes the prejudice inspired by the personal descriptions, they learn to like the characters, despite their wealth of golden hair, their luminous hazel eyes, their finely chiselled noses, their mouths steeled by sudden stubborn intolerance, their rounded, satiny wrists, the flashes of their white teeth, the grave music of their tender peaceful voices, the impulsive color of their olive cheeks, the refractory curls which are tossed back from their childist foreheads, and the glowing wine of summer which emanates from every inch of their wholesome physiques.

- Constance, the eldest of the Herriotts, is a sweet, strong, ideal woman. She is mother, father, sister, brother, and guardian, all in one.
- Eleanor, self-willed, passionate, and selfish. Eleanor learns through bitterness and cold, hard trial, the lessons of gentleness, submission, and wisdom.
- The men in the book present very much the same contrasting picture.

== Themes ==
In this romance novel, love and loyalty, sorrow and disappointment, as well as living and learning blend together as a basis for the author's theme.
