= Ethan Canin =

American author, educator, and physician

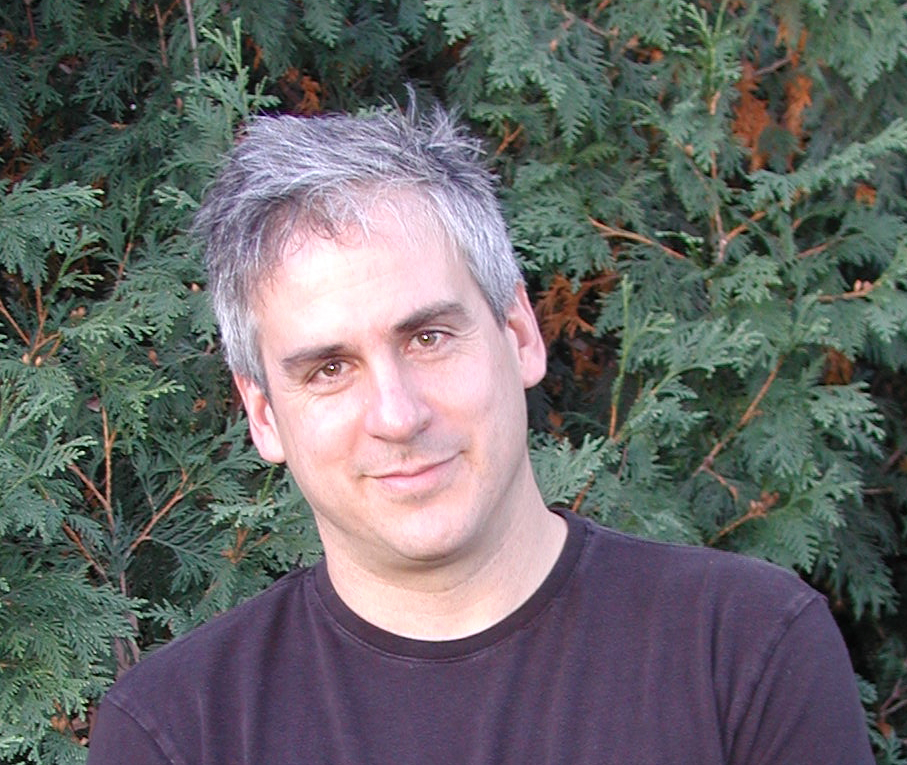
- Canin in Iowa City, Iowa
- Born: July 19, 1960 (age 66); Ann Arbor, Michigan, U.S.
- Education: Stanford University (BA); University of Iowa (MFA); Harvard University (MD)
- Occupations: Author; educator; physician
- Children: 3
- Parent: Stuart Canin (father)
- Writing career
- Genres: Novel, Short story
- Notable awards: Guggenheim Fellowship, National Endowment for the Arts fellowship

Ethan Andrew Canin (born July 19, 1960) is an American author, educator, and physician. He is a member of the faculty of the Iowa Writers' Workshop at the University of Iowa.

Canin was born in Ann Arbor, Michigan, while his parents were vacationing from Iowa City, where his father, Stuart Canin, taught violin at the University of Iowa. He and his family moved around the midwestern and northeastern United States, and eventually settled in San Francisco, California, where he attended Town School and later graduated from San Francisco University High School. He attended Stanford University and earned an undergraduate degree in English. Returning to the University of Iowa, Canin entered the Iowa Writers' Workshop, receiving an MFA in 1984, and went on to attend Harvard Medical School, where he earned an M.D. in 1991.

Beginning his medical practice with a residency at the University of California San Francisco, he pursued both medicine and writing for several years, leaving medicine in 1995 to join the faculty of the Iowa Writers' Workshop, where he still teaches. He is a co-founder of the San Francisco Writers Grotto.

Canin is married with three daughters.

== Awards ==
- The Houghton Mifflin Literary Fellowship (1986)
- Henfield/Transatlantic Review Prize (1987)
- The California Book Award/Gold Medal in Literature (1994)
- The Lyndhurst Prize (1994–1996)
- National Endowment for the Arts Fellowship (1987 & 1996)
- Guggenheim Fellowship (2010)

== Writing ==
=== Short story collections ===
- Emperor of the Air (1988) Houghton Mifflin ISBN 978-0-395-42976-1
- The Palace Thief (1994) Random House ISBN 978-0-679-41962-4

=== Novels ===
- Blue River (1992) Time Warner International ISBN 978-0-446-39447-5
- For Kings and Planets (1999) Saint Martin's Press Inc. ISBN 978-0-312-24125-4
- Carry Me Across the Water (2001) Bloomsbury Publishing PLC. ISBN 978-0-7475-5790-6
- America America (2009) Bloomsbury Publishing PLC. ISBN 978-0-7475-9872-5
- A Doubter's Almanac: A Novel (2016) Random House ISBN 978-1-4000-6826-5

== Filmography ==
Several of Canin's novels and short stories have been adapted for film. (Note: The series 24, while not written by or featuring Canin, has a character named Ethan Kanin who was named after the writer.)

=== Short films ===
- Emperor of the Air (1996) dir. Ali Selim

=== Feature films ===
- Blue River (1995) dir. Larry Elikann, based on the novel of the same name
- The Emperor's Club (2002) dir. Michael Hoffman, based on the 1994 short story "The Palace Thief"
- Beautiful Ohio (2006) dir. Chad Lowe, based on the 1994 short story "Batorsag and Szerelem"
- The Year of Getting to Know Us (2008) dir. Patrick Sisam, based on the 1988 story "Star Food" and the 1987 story "The Year of Getting to Know Us"
