= Mary Therese Austin =

American theater critic, tennis club founder (d. 1889)

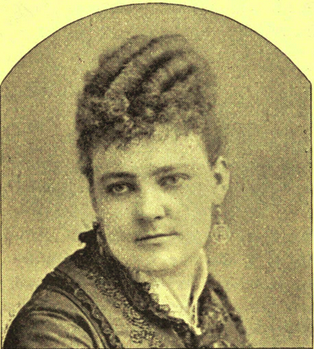
- Austin in an 1893 publication.
- Born: Mary Therese Hart; Greenbay, Illinois
- Died: January 1, 1889; San Francisco, California, U.S.
- Resting place: Laurel Hill Cemetery
- Education: State Normal School, San Jose, California
- Occupation: Writer
- Spouse: Joseph Austin
- Relatives: Jerome Alfred Hart (brother)
- Writing career
- Pen name: Betsy B.
- Genres: theater critic; travel writer

Mary Therese Austin (pen name, Betsy B. or Betsy Bee; d. 1889) was an American theater critic, travel writer, salon holder, and tennis club founder. Based in Northern California, she wrote much and on many subjects. In her era, she had the widest reputation as a critic.

== Early life and education ==
Mary Therese Hart was born in Greenbay, Illinois, coming to California when but a child. She had several siblings, including a brother, Jerome Alfred Hart, who was a newspaper editor and also wrote novels.

Austin was a graduate of the State Normal School in San Jose, California, but did not teach thereafter.

== Career ==
Austin's first entry in the literary field was made in 1874 as dramatic critic of The Daily Alta California. After 12 years, she left Alta and for a few months, became contributor to the San Francisco News Letter. When The Argonaut, was founded by Frank Somers and soon taken over by Frank M. Pixley, she was immediately retained as a member of the staff, and her letters and articles speedily became one of the attractions of that journal. When her brother, Jerome A. Hart, became connected with The Argonaut, in 1877, she accepted the dramatic position on that journal. Austin excelled as a drama critic with her weekly reviews, her judgment characterized as clear and unbiased.. "Betsy B's" estimate of an actor or actress was invariably accepted as accurate.

It was as correspondent for The Argonaut that Austin visited the Eastern United States. In 1887, she went to Europe, and in 1881, to Japan and China, writing a series of letters for the Argonaut upon her travels. She was admired as a correspondent and contributor of travel letters on European life, as well as French and German scenery and music.

In 1884, in San Francisco, she founded the California Tennis Club.

For some years, Austin had a close circle of friends who assembled in her rooms on Sunday evenings and spent three or four hours in discussion, conversation, badinage, and even in simple games that relieved the seriousness of literary and artistic talk.

== Personal life ==
Her husband, Joseph ("Joe") Austin, was from Scotland. He was associated with the Claims department for the Pacific Mail Steamship Company. He served as a commissioner of the Golden Gate Park, and president of the board.

In the summer of 1888, Joseph and Mary Austin, and her sisters, moved into the Zeta Psi clubhouse in Berkeley, California.

She died of Bright's Disease, at the Palace Hotel, in San Francisco, on January 1, 1889, with interment at Laurel Hill Cemetery.
