= Emma Wolf =

American author (1865–1932)

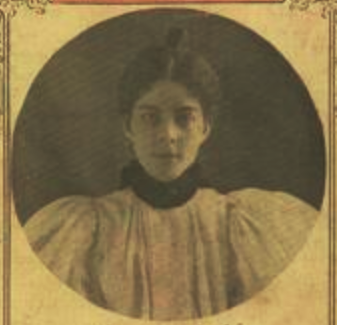
- (1896)
- Born: June 15, 1865; San Francisco, California, U.S.
- Died: August 30, 1932 (aged 67); San Francisco, California, U.S.
- Education: Girls High School; California State Normal School
- Occupation: Author
- Writing career
- Genres: American Jews; New Woman
- Notable work: A Prodigal in Love

Emma Wolf (June 15, 1865 – August 30, 1932) was an American litterateur and novelist. She published early in life and was the author of five novels. Wolf was born with a congenital defect and spent part of her life in a wheelchair.

== Early life and education ==
Emma Wolf was born June 15, 1865, in San Francisco, California. Her parents, Simon and Annette (née Levy) Wolf, were Jewish and were emigrants from Alsace, France. There were ten siblings, including a sister, Alice, who was also an author.

She was educated in the public schools of San Francisco, including the Girls High School, as well as the Teacher's College. A physical disability kept her from becoming a teacher.

== Career ==
Early on, Wolf developed a bent for publishing her work. Her Jewish-themed novels attracted particular attention, while other novels focused on the changing roles of women. Numerous short stories were contributed to magazines.

Her first novel, Other Things Being Equal (Chicago, A. C. McClurg, 1892), focused on the present-day social life of the American Jew, with the lesson derived being that other things being equal, a Jewish woman may marry a Christian. It affirmed the morality and peace of Jewish homes. A Prodigal in Love (New York City, Harper, 1894), again set in San Francisco, was a successful novel telling the story of home perplexities. This was followed by Joy of Life (New York City, A. C. McClurg, 1896), the story of two very different brothers. Heirs of Yesterday (Chicago, A. C. McClurg, 1900) was described by Adler & Szold (1906) as "an interesting novel in which the force of tradition upon the Jew and the prejudiced attitude of the Christians are the underlying motives". Wolf's last novel, published in 1916, was entitled Fulfillment.

== Personal life ==
Affected by a congenital defect, Wolf did not lead a very active life. In her later years, she was reliant on a wheelchair. She lived for a number of years at San Francisco's Dante Sanitorium. Wolf was a member of Congregation Emanu-El and the Philomath Club.

Emma Wolf died in San Francisco, on August 30, 1932.

== Selected works ==
- Other Things Being Equal (1892)
- A Prodigal in Love (1894)
- Joy of Life (1896)
- Heirs of Yesterday (1900)
- Fulfillment (1916)

== Gallery ==
Other things being equal (1892)

A prodigal in love (1894)

The joy of life (1896)

Heirs of yesterday (1900)

Fulfillment (1916)
