= Andy Couturier =

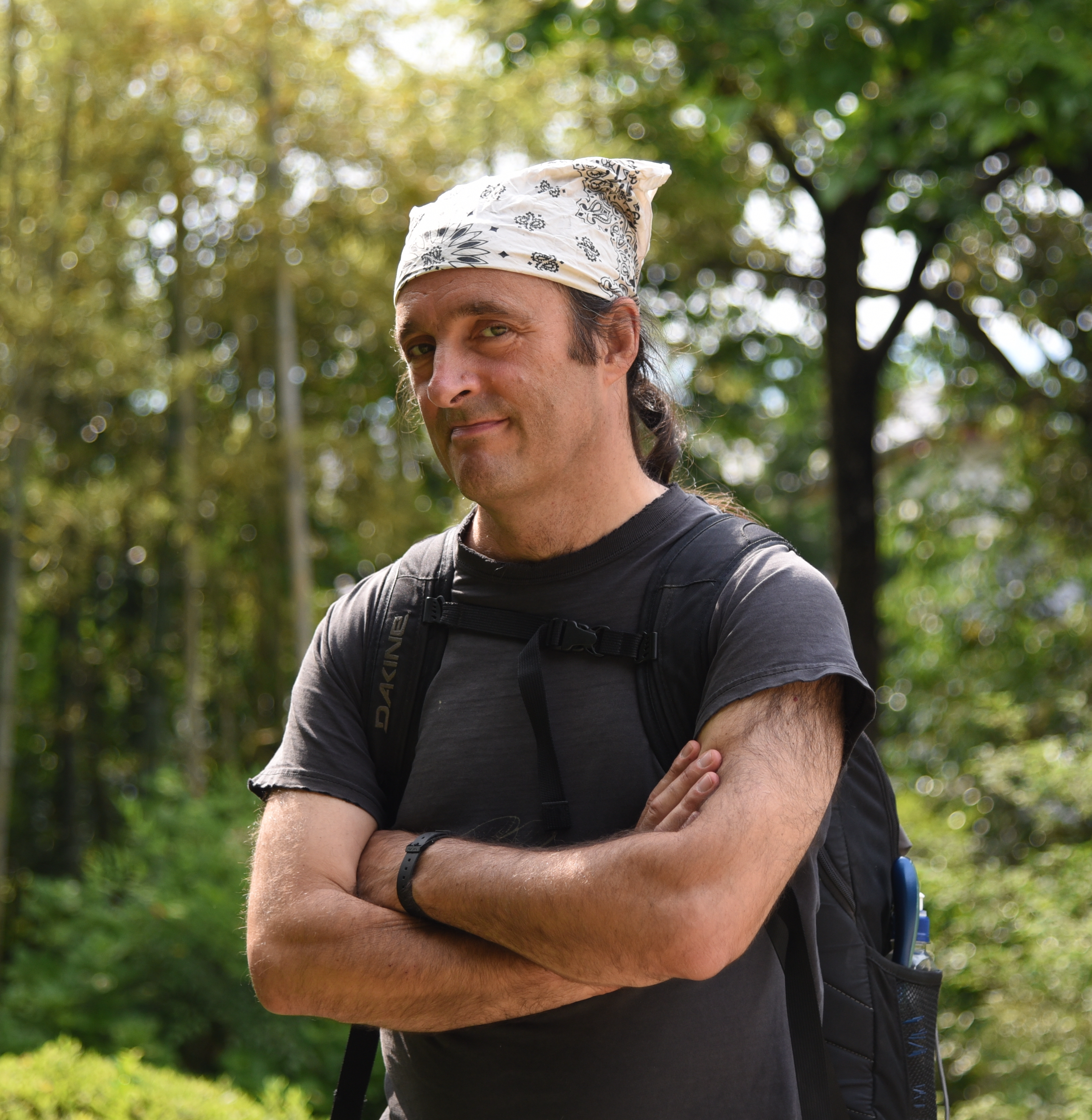
Andy Couturier, founder and creative director of The Opening, is the Nautilus Gold Book Award-winning author of The Abundance of Less: Lessons in Simple Living from Rural Japan from North Atlantic Books

Andy Couturier (born June 3, 1964) is an American author and winner of the 2017 Nautilus Book Award, Gold, in Green Living/Sustainability. His books include Writing Open the Mind: Tapping the Subconscious to Free the Writing and the Writer (Ulysses Press, 2005), A Different Kind of Luxury: Japanese Lessons in Simple Living and Inner Abundance (Stone Bridge Press, 2010), and The Abundance of Less: Lessons in Simple Living from Rural Japan (North Atlantic Books, 2017). The Abundance of Less is a revised and updated edition of his previous work. His essays and articles on ecology, sustainable living, and the problems inherent with nuclear power have appeared in The Japan Times, North American Review, Adbusters, Kyoto Journal, the Oakland Tribune, and Creative Nonfiction.

He was born in New York City, and grew up in Washington D.C. and Chicago. He lived in Japan for four years working as a teacher, a journalist and researching Japanese aesthetics. He is the founder and creative director for a private creative writing school, The Opening, which offers courses in Santa Cruz, Berkeley, Oakland, internationally, and online.

== Bibliography ==
- A Different Kind of Luxury: Japanese Lessons in Simple Living and Inner Abundance ISBN 1-933330-83-X
- Writing Open the Mind: Tapping the Subconscious to Free the Writing and the Writer ISBN 1-56975-476-4
- The Abundance of Less: Lessons in Simple Living from Rural Japan ISBN 1-62317-132-6
