= Suey Park =

Korean American social justice internet activist

- Born: 1990 (age 35–36); Detroit, Michigan, U.S.
- Education: University of Illinois Urbana-Champaign
- Occupations: Former internet activist, writer
- Known for: The #CancelColbert campaign

Suey Park is a pseudonym used by a Korean American social justice internet activist (born in 1990) most known for creating the 2014 Twitter hashtag campaign #CancelColbert, which has been called "one of the ur-examples of cancel culture" by columnist Ross Douthat. Other Twitter campaigns she has initiated that became trending on Twitter and received widespread media coverage include #NotYourAsianSidekick in 2013 and #NotMyChristianLeader in 2014. In 2014, The Guardian named her one of the "top 30 young people in digital media".

== Early life ==
Park was born in Detroit. Her parents emigrated there from South Korea in the late 1980s after her father was accepted into an MBA program at Wayne State University. The family moved to Chicago when Park was five years old. Park's parents were conservative, and she was as well until her second year of studies at the University of Illinois Urbana-Champaign.

== #CancelColbert ==
Park initiated this campaign in an attempt to convince the television network to cancel The Colbert Report over a tweet satirizing the foundation of the Washington Redskins Original Americans Foundation. The offending tweet from the Colbert show's Twitter account, posted on March 27, 2014, read: "I am willing to show #Asian community I care by introducing the Ching-Chong Ding-Dong Foundation for Sensitivity to Orientals or Whatever." Though intended as satire, Park thought the joke went too far. While Park's hashtag became trending on Twitter and widely covered in US media, it was ultimately unsuccessful in that neither Colbert nor the show ended up cancelled, though the show's Twitter account was deleted by Colbert, live on an episode of the show, and Colbert issued a semi-apology, saying "I never want this to happen again." Park's outspokenness and role in launching the campaign led to her receiving multiple rape and death threats, leading Park to shave her head and move from Chicago to New York City. Park also reported being "stalked and hunted" for months afterwards. Her story was featured in the pilot episode of the reality television series The Internet Ruined My Life which aired on Syfy in 2016.

== See also ==
- Hashtag activism
- Cancel culture
