= Gail Tsukiyama =

American novelist

- Born: San Francisco, California, U.S.
- Education: San Francisco State University (BA, MA)
- Occupation: Author

Gail Tsukiyama is an American novelist from San Francisco, California, USA.

== Early life ==
Tsukiyama was born in San Francisco, to a Japanese father and a Chinese mother. She attended San Francisco State University, where she received both her Bachelor of Arts Degree and a Master of Arts Degree in English with an emphasis in creative writing.

== Career ==
Tsukiyama works as a part-time lecturer for San Francisco State University and a freelance book-reviewer for the San Francisco Chronicle.

Tsukiyama is an alumna of the Ragdale Foundation. She lives in El Cerrito, California.

== Works ==
Tsukiyama was one of nine fiction authors to appear during the first Library of Congress National Book Festival. Her works include Women of the Silk (1991), The Samurai's Garden (1995), Night of Many Dreams (1998), The Language of Threads (1999), Dreaming Water (2002), The Street of a Thousand Blossoms (2007), A Hundred Flowers (2012), The Color of Air (2020), and The Brightest Star (2023).
