= Varley O'Connor =

American novelist

- Education: Boston University (BFA); University of California, Irvine (MFA)
- Occupations: Novelist, short story writer

Varley O'Connor is an American novelist and short story writer. She is an associate professor at Kent State University.

== Biography ==
Having earned a BFA in acting from Boston University, O’Connor worked for several years as an actress. She enrolled in the Programs in Writing at the University of California, Irvine, graduating with an MFA (fiction emphasis) in 1989.

== Works ==
O'Connor has published four novels, all of which have been critically acclaimed: Like China (William Morrow, 1991), A Company of Three (Algonquin Books, 2003), The Cure, and The Master's Muse (Scribner, 2012). She currently teaches both fiction and nonfiction creative writing at Kent State University. O'Connor has also published a number of short stories. Recent short prose has appeared in The Missouri Review, Santa Monica Review, Publishers Weekly, AWP Writer's Chronicle, and The Sun.

O'Connor's novels deal with disparate elements: domestic marital abuse in Like China; the struggle to balance friendship, love and success in the acting world in A Company of Three; the flow and complexities of relationships in an extended family, set against a background of illness and wartime life in The Cure; and the relationship between Tanaquil LeClercq and George Balanchine in The Master's Muse.
