= Daniel Terdiman =

American journalist

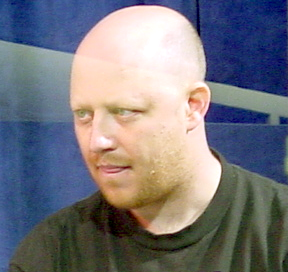
- Education: Columbia University Graduate School of Journalism (MS)
- Occupations: Journalist and columnist
- Notable credit(s): Won the 2006 online journalism award from the Society of Professional Journalists, as part of the CNET team who won this award for the series Taking Back the Web.
- Website: danielterdiman.blogspot.com

Daniel Terdiman is an American journalist, who has been published in both print and non-print media, including Time, The New York Times, Wired, CNET, Martha Stewart Weddings, Salon.com, Business 2.0, VentureBeat and the San Francisco Chronicle. He writes about a wide range of subjects from hi-tech to the web to sports.

He has also made speaking appearances at hi-tech conferences as an expert on electronic game development, including: State of Play, Webzine, SVForum, and Sex in Video Games. He has also written extensively about the online game Second Life. He has been a game development advisor for US National Public Radio (NPR) for the Talk of the Nation broadcast and for the BBC in the UK.

He edited and contributed as an author to Drama in the Desert: The Sights and Sounds of Burning Man, a 2002 book about the annual Burning Man arts festival, held in the Nevada desert. He wrote The Entrepreneur's Guide to Second Life: Making Money in the Metaverse. He was the panel moderator at the Game Developers Conference 2007, on the topic of Burning Man.

He holds a Masters of Science in journalism from the Columbia University Graduate School of Journalism. He currently works as a senior writer for VentureBeat. Terdiman won the 2006 online journalism award from the Society of Professional Journalists, as part of the CNET team who won this award for the series Taking Back the Web.

== Works ==
As CNET senior writer:

- Terdiman, Daniel (January 10, 2007). "To delete Wikipedia entry or not to delete?". CNET.
- Terdiman, Daniel (December 18, 2006). "Into the wild blue virtual yonder". CNET.
- Terdiman, Daniel (November 15, 2005). "How wikis are changing our view of the world". CNET.
- Terdiman, Daniel (August 23, 2006). "Can German engineering fix Wikipedia?". CNET.
- Terdiman, Daniel (December 5, 2005). "Growing pains for Wikipedia". CNET.
- Terdiman, Daniel (September 28, 2005). "Wikibooks takes on textbook industry". CNET.
- Further List of articles by Daniel Terdiman for CNET (2,026 articles)

As Wired staff writer

- List of 193 articles by Daniel Terdiman for Wired. Archived from the original February 8, 2007.

Other articles

- "A Blog for Baseball Fans Builds a League of Sites". The New York Times, April 8, 2005.
- "Untitled", Martha Stewart Weddings, Spring 2004 issue, page 352.
- "A Vacation Home of Your Own...". Business 2.0 published at CNN Money. January 1, 2004.
- "World Series or wedding plans? That is the question". San Francisco Chronicle. April 14, 2003.
- "Apocalypse Now". Time. July 1, 2002.
- "Sneaking peeks at the porn clowns". Salon. March 7, 2002. Archived from the original on February 24, 2007.
