= Edan Lepucki =

American novelist

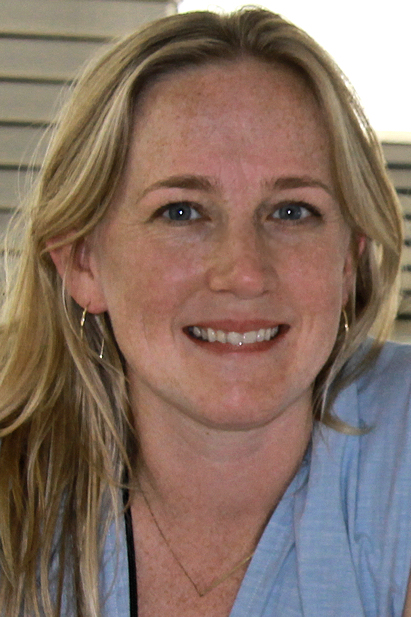
- Lepucki at the 2014 Texas Book Festival
- Education: Oberlin College; Iowa Writers' Workshop
- Occupation: Novelist
- Website: www.edanlepucki.com

Edan Lepucki is an American novelist notable for her debut novel, California, which rose to prominence as a result of a public dispute between comedian Stephen Colbert and online publisher Amazon.

== Early life ==
Edan Lepucki grew up in Los Angeles, California and graduated from Oberlin College and the University of Iowa Writers' Workshop.

== Career ==
Lepucki's debut novel, California, rose to prominence as a result of a public dispute between comedian Stephen Colbert and online publisher Amazon, which arose when Colbert urged his viewers on two successive nights of his talk show to pre-order copies of the novel from his own publisher, the Hachette Book Group.

The novel was subsequently reviewed by national newspapers including The Boston Globe, The Washington Post, The New York Times the Los Angeles Times, and others. The New York Times suggested Lepucki had, in effect, "won the literary Lotto". The San Jose Mercury News described Lepucki as a "terrific writer." According to one report, Lepucki signed 10,000 copies of her novel over the span of three days.

Lepucki is an instructor with the UCLA Extension Writers' Program. Her fiction has appeared in McSweeney's, Los Angeles Times Magazine, Narrative Magazine, Meridian and elsewhere.

== Works ==
=== Books ===
- Woman No. 17 Crown/Archetype
- California, Hachette Publishers
- If You're Not Yet Like Me, Novella, 2014, ISBN 978-0-9913141-0-2
- Time's Mouth, Berkeley: Catapult, 2023, ISBN 978-1-64009-572-4.

=== Essays ===
- "Naked and Unafraid and Totally In Public", Elle, May 2, 2017
