= San Francisco Writers Workshop =

American writing critique group

The San Francisco Writers Workshop is one of the oldest continuously running writing critique groups in the United States, meeting every Tuesday night, except for major holidays, since 1946. Successful published authors who first workshopped their books in the group include Khaled Hosseini, David Henry Sterry, Aaron Hamburger, Joe Quirk, Michelle Gagnon, Kemble Scott, Tamim Ansary, Erika Mailman, Zack Lynch, Zarina Zabrisky, and Ransom Stephens.

Tamim Ansary moderated the workshop for twenty-two years until his retirement in 2015. Currently, the workshop is moderated by Kurt Wallace Martin, Judy Viertel, James Warner, Monya Baker, and Olga Zilberbourg. The workshop is free and open to all interested writers and genres, providing a forum to share work-in-progress and receive constructive critiques from other writers. The group meets at Noisebridge, in San Francisco's Mission district.

Sessions are uniquely structured so participants share, aloud, up to six double-spaced pages of their work at a time. Writers are not allowed to speak or respond while the group critiques their work.

== San Francisco Writers Workshop Alumni ==
Some of the published authors who have emerged from the workshop:

Note: Partial List - Updates Requested

- Tamim Ansary, author of West of Kabul, East of New York, The Other Side of the Sky: A Memoir, Destiny Disrupted: A History of the World Through Islamic Eyes, The Widow's Husband
- George Benet, author of A Short Dance in the Sun, A Place in Colusa
- Robin Bullard, author of I Came by Cab. Robin moderated the workshop from 2015 to 2016
- Melodie Bowsher, author of My Lost and Found Life
- Michael Chorost, author of Rebuilt: How Becoming Part Computer Made Me More Human, World Wide Mind: The Coming Integration of Humanity, Machines, and the Internet
- Elaine Elison, coauthor with Stan Yogi of Wherever There's a Fight: How Runaway Slaves, Suffragists, Immigrants, Strikers, and Poets Shaped Civil Liberties in California
- Tim Floreen, author of Willful Machines
- Michelle Gagnon, author of The Tunnels, Boneyard, The Gatekeeper, Kidnap & Ransom
- Stan Golberg, author of Lessons for the Living
- Yanina Gotsulsky, author of Speed of Life
- Aaron Hamburger, author of The View from Stalin's Head, Faith for Beginners
- Jiyoung Han, author of Honey in the Wound
- Leonard Irving, author of Farewell Dundrennan, The Bird Poems, Beyond Hadrian's Wall
- Khaled Hosseini, author of The Kite Runner, A Thousand Splendid Suns
- Irete Lazo, author of The Accidental Santera
- Gary Johnston, author of Kazoo Bop
- Marlene Lee, author of The Absent Woman, Rebecca's Road, Scoville, Limestone Wall, No Certain Home
- Ella Leffland, author of Rumors of Peace, The Knight, Death and the Devil, Love Out of Season, Breath and Shadows, Mrs. Munck,
- Dean Lipton, author of Malpractice: Autobiography of a Victim, Faces of Crime and Genius: the Historical Impact of the Genius-Criminal
- Erika Mailman, author of Woman of Ill Fame, The Witch's Trinity
- Elise Frances Miller, author of The Berkeley Girl, In Paris, 1968 (originally published as A Time to Cast Away Stones), The Berkeley Girl: Rendezvous in London
- Peg Alford Pursell, author of Show Her a Flower a Bird a Shadow
- Joe Quirk, author of The Ultimate Rush, It's Not You, It's Biology, Exult, Seasteading, Call to the Rescue
- Kemble Scott, (novelist pen name of Scott James, columnist for The New York Times) author of SoMa, The Sower
- Michael Sheahan, author of The Sean
- Holly Shumas, author of Five Things I Can't Live Without, Love and Other Natural Disasters
- Ransom Stephens, author of The God Patent
- Ilse Sternberger, author of Princes Without a Home: Modern Zionism and the Strange Fate of Theodor Herzl's Children
- David Henry Sterry, author of Chicken: Self Portrait of a Young Man for Rent, Master of Ceremonies: A Story Story of Sex, Drugs, Roller skates, and Murder, editor of Ho's Hookers, Callgirls, and Rentboys
- Bryna Stevens, author of Frank Thompson: Her Civil War Story, Handl and the Famous Sword Swallower of Halle, Deborah Sampson Goes to War, Ben Franklin's Glass Armonica
- Mary Tall Mountain, author of A Quick Brush of Wings, Listen to the Night, Light on the Tent Wall
- Ian Tuttle, author of StretchyHead
- James Warner, author of All Her Father's Guns
- Zarina Zabrisky, author of Iron and We, Monsters
- Amy Zemser, author of Beyond the Mango Tree
