= David Koepp =

American screenwriter and director (born 1963)

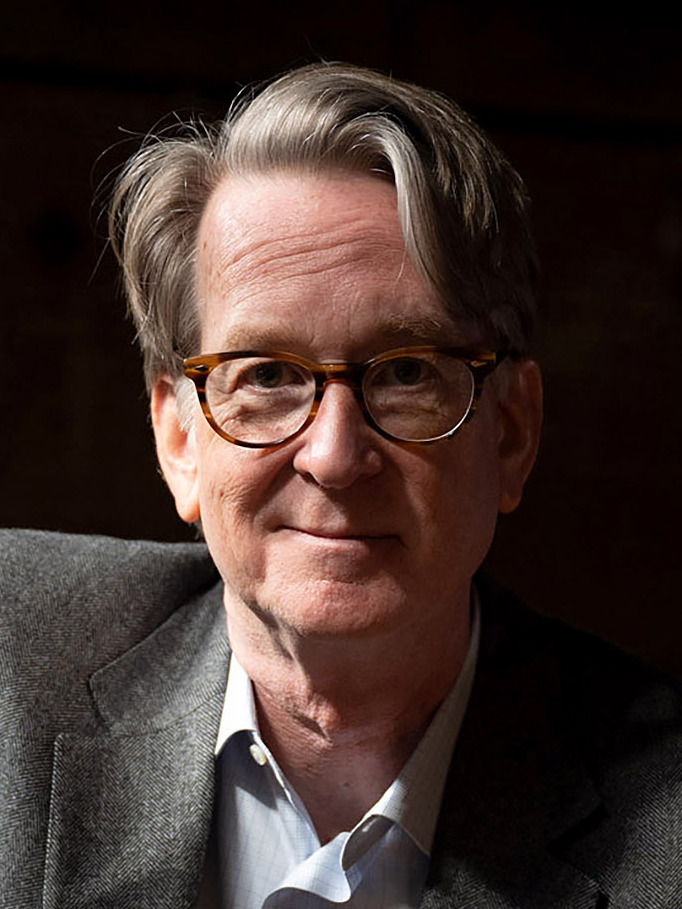
- Koepp in 2022
- Born: June 9, 1963 (age 63); Pewaukee, Wisconsin, U.S.
- Education: University of Minnesota (attended); University of Wisconsin, Madison (attended); University of California, Los Angeles (BFA)
- Occupations: Screenwriter; director; author
- Years active: 1988–present
- Known for: Full list
- Spouses: Rosario Varela (divorced): Melissa Thomas
- Children: 4

David Koepp (/kɛp/; born June 9, 1963) is an American screenwriter and director. As of February 2026, he is the fourth most successful screenwriter of all time in terms of U.S. box office receipts with a total gross of over $2.97 billion.

Koepp is known for a variety of screenplays, including those of the Steven Spielberg–directed films Jurassic Park (1993), The Lost World: Jurassic Park (1997), War of the Worlds (2005), Indiana Jones and the Kingdom of the Crystal Skull (2008) and Disclosure Day (2026). Other Koepp screenplays include those for the crime film Carlito's Way (1993); the action spy films Mission: Impossible (1996) and Jack Ryan: Shadow Recruit (2014); the superhero film Spider-Man (2002); another Indiana Jones film, The Dial of Destiny (2023); and another Jurassic Park film, Jurassic World Rebirth (2025).

Koepp has also directed seven feature films: The Trigger Effect (1996), Stir of Echoes (1999), Secret Window (2004), Ghost Town (2008), Premium Rush (2012), Mortdecai (2015), and You Should Have Left (2020).

== Early life ==
Koepp was born in Pewaukee, Wisconsin, as the youngest of four children to Margaret (Fairfield), a family therapist, and Donald Koepp, who owned a billboard company.

Originally studying to become an actor, first at the University of Minnesota for one year and afterwards at the University of Wisconsin–Madison for two years, he enrolled in the film school of the University of California, Los Angeles, in 1984. He graduated with a bachelor's degree in film from UCLA in 1990.

== Career ==
=== 1990s and 2000s ===
As a writer, Koepp worked on blockbuster Hollywood films such as Jurassic Park with Steven Spielberg, Mission: Impossible with Brian De Palma and Spider-Man with Sam Raimi.

Koepp had a cameo appearance as the "Unlucky Bastard", a minor character devoured by a T. rex that roams San Diego in The Lost World: Jurassic Park, which he co-wrote and for which he was a second unit director. Although Koepp did not write Jurassic Park III, he did devise the film's basic storyline. Koepp later declined an offer to write a script for the fourth film in the series, Jurassic World, as he felt he had nothing left to contribute to the series.

Koepp was reportedly paid $4,000,000 for his Panic Room screenplay. He wrote the screenplay for Indiana Jones and the Kingdom of the Crystal Skull for Spielberg and George Lucas and co-wrote and directed 2008's Ghost Town starring Ricky Gervais and Greg Kinnear.

Koepp's work as a director has not had quite the same box office success. His films include Secret Window, Stir of Echoes, and The Trigger Effect. Koepp has worked in television, creating the 2002 series Hack starring David Morse.

=== 2010s ===
In 2012, Koepp directed Premium Rush, which he co-wrote with John Kamps. In an August 2011 lawsuit, Joe Quirk, the author of the 1998 novel The Ultimate Rush, accused Koepp and the makers of Premium Rush of copyright infringement. On April 2, 2013, U.S. District Judge Richard Seeborg dismissed this case, finding that the two works were not substantially similar.

On February 17, 2013, Koepp received the WGA East's Ian McClellan Hunter Award for Career Achievement.

On July 10, 2013, Lionsgate was reported to have acquired the comedic crime novel The Great Mortdecai Moustache Mystery, written by Kyril Bonfiglioli. Koepp directed the film, titled Mortdecai, from a script by Eric Aronson. Johnny Depp played the lead role of Charlie Mortdecai, and the film also featured Gwyneth Paltrow, Ewan McGregor, and Paul Bettany. Koepp adapted the Marcus Sakey novel Brilliance, which will star Will Smith and Noomi Rapace.

On March 15, 2016, The Walt Disney Company announced a fifth installment of the Indiana Jones saga, with Koepp as its screenwriter and Spielberg directing again. By June 2018, Koepp ultimately backed out of the project due to his commitment to You Should Have Left, a horror drama film Koepp wrote and directed. Based on the novel of the same name by Daniel Kehlmann, You Should Have Left was released in 2020, and stars Kevin Bacon and Amanda Seyfried.

On September 3, 2019, Koepp made his novel debut with the publication of Cold Storage, a science-fiction thriller. A film adaptation was announced in May 2022 from Studiocanal, with Koepp writing the screenplay and Jonny Campbell directing; the cast consists of Liam Neeson, Joe Keery, Georgina Campbell, and Sosie Bacon.

=== 2020s ===
On December 10, 2020, Amasia Entertainment and Universal Pictures announced Koepp had been tapped to write the script for a reboot of the Green Hornet franchise titled The Green Hornet and Kato. On February 25, 2021, it was announced Koepp would write and co-produce the thriller Kimi, directed by Steven Soderbergh and starring Zoë Kravitz. The film was released on Max (then HBO Max) on February 10, 2022.

Koepp's second novel Aurora was published on June 7, 2022, and a film adaptation of the book is in development for Netflix, with Koepp writing the script and Kathryn Bigelow directing.

Koepp wrote the screenplay for the psychological thriller film Presence, which was directed by Soderbergh and premiered at the 2024 Sundance Film Festival. Koepp would reunite with Soderbergh on spy film Black Bag, which was released in theatres on March 14, 2025 by Focus Features. On January 22, 2024, it was announced that Koepp would return to the Jurassic Park franchise by writing Jurassic World Rebirth, with Gareth Edwards directing and Spielberg serving as executive producer. In April 2024, it was confirmed that Koepp and Spielberg would work again on an original film about UFOs, later revealed to be titled Disclosure Day with a planned June 2026 release.

== Personal life ==
Koepp was married to artist Rosario Varela, with whom he has two children. After they divorced, Koepp married writer Melissa Thomas, with whom he also has two children.

== Filmography ==
=== Film ===
Koepp's film credits
Year	Title	Director	Writer	Producer	Notes
1988	Apartment Zero	No	Yes	Yes	Wrote with Martin Donovan
1990	Bad Influence	No	Yes	No	
1990	Why Me?	No	Yes	No	Credited as Leonard Maas Jr.; Wrote with Donald E. Westlake
1990	I Come in Peace	No	Yes	No	Credited as Leonard Maas Jr.; Wrote with Jonathan Tydor
1991	Toy Soldiers	No	Yes	No	Wrote with Daniel Petrie Jr.
1992	Death Becomes Her	No	Yes	No	Wrote with Martin Donovan
1993	Jurassic Park	No	Yes	No	Wrote with Michael Crichton
1993	Carlito's Way	No	Yes	No	
1994	The Paper	No	Yes	Co-producer	Wrote with Stephen Koepp
1994	The Shadow	No	Yes	No	
1994	Suspicious	Yes	Yes	No	Short film
1996	Mission: Impossible	No	Yes	No	Wrote with Robert Towne and Steven Zaillian
1996	The Trigger Effect	Yes	Yes	No	
1997	The Lost World: Jurassic Park	No	Yes	No	Also second unit director and cameo
1998	Snake Eyes	No	Yes	No	Wrote with Brian De Palma
1999	Stir of Echoes	Yes	Yes	No	
2002	Panic Room	No	Yes	No	
2002	Spider-Man	No	Yes	No	
2004	Secret Window	Yes	Yes	No	
2005	War of the Worlds	No	Yes	No	Wrote with Josh Friedman
2005	Zathura: A Space Adventure	No	Yes	No	Wrote with John Kamps
2008	Indiana Jones and the Kingdom of the Crystal Skull	No	Yes	No	Wrote with George Lucas and Jeff Nathanson
2008	Ghost Town	Yes	Yes	No	Wrote with John Kamps
2009	Angels & Demons	No	Yes	No	Wrote with Akiva Goldsman
2011	The Little Engine That Could	No	Yes	No	Wrote with John Kamps, Cliff Ruby and Elana Lesser
2012	Premium Rush	Yes	Yes	No	Wrote with John Kamps
2014	Jack Ryan: Shadow Recruit	No	Yes	No	Wrote with Adam Cozad
2015	Mortdecai	Yes	No	No	
2016	Inferno	No	Yes	No	
2017	The Mummy	No	Yes	No	Wrote with Christopher McQuarrie and Dylan Kussman
2020	You Should Have Left	Yes	Yes	No	
2022	Kimi	No	Yes	Yes	
2023	Indiana Jones and the Dial of Destiny	No	Yes	No	Wrote with Jez Butterworth, John-Henry Butterworth and James Mangold
2024	Presence	No	Yes	Executive	
2025	Black Bag	No	Yes	Executive	
2025	Jurassic World Rebirth	No	Yes	No	
2026	Cold Storage	No	Yes	Yes	Based on his novel
2026	Disclosure Day	No	Yes	No	story by Spielberg

=== Television ===
Koepp's television credits
Year	Title	Director	Writer	Notes
2002	Hack	No	Yes	Creator
2003	Suspense	Yes	No	TV movie

=== Unproduced scripts ===
Year	Title	Notes
1987	FatCity Upside Down	
1990	Here and There	
1997	Blackwater	co-wrote with Brian De Palma
1998	Mr. Hughes	co-wrote with Brian De Palma
1999	The Sea-Wolf	
2000	The Superconducting Supercollider of Sparkle Creek, Wisconsin	co-wrote with John Kamps
2001	A Trip Uptown	
2002	Amazing Spider-Man	
2006	The Taking of Pelham 123	Co-wrote with Peter Stone
2009	Billionaire's Vinegar	co-wrote with John Kamps
2009	Article II	
2009	Pirate Latitudes	
2011	Spy vs. Spy	co-wrote with John Kamps
2011	The Thin Man	
2012	The Wind	
2014	Brilliance	
2015	The Themis Files	
2017	Bride of Frankenstein	
2018	Blackhawk	
2020	Green Hornet and Kato	
2022	Aurora	based on his novel
2026	Westworld	

== Bibliography ==
- — (2019). Cold Storage: A Novel. New York: Ecco. ISBN 978-0-06-291643-3. LCCN 2018057661. OCLC 1078435646.
- — (2022). Aurora: A Novel. New York: Harper. ISBN 978-0-06-291647-1.
