= Michelle Gagnon =

American novelist

- Born: 1971 (age 54–55)
- Occupation: Novelist
- Genre: Crime fiction, Thrillers
- Literary movement: Modern crime fiction

Website
- www.michellegagnon.com

Michelle Gagnon (born 1971) is an American crime fiction novelist. Her bestselling thrillers have been published in more than a dozen countries worldwide. She has dual citizenship in the US and Ireland, and currently lives in San Francisco. Her second novel, Boneyard, was nominated for the Daphne du Maurier award for Excellence in Mystery/Suspense Along with Tamim Ansary, Khaled Hosseini, and Kemble Scott, she is part of the San Francisco Writers Workshop . Her Young Adult Persef0ne trilogy received starred reviews from Kirkus, VOYA, and School Library Journal, and was an IndieNext pick for Autumn 2012. It was also selected by the esteemed Junior Library Guild, and by the Texas State Library Association for their recommended reading list for teens.

== Bibliography ==
- The Tunnels (2007)
- Boneyard (2008)
- The Gatekeeper (2009)
- Kidnap & Ransom (2010)
- Don't Turn Around (2012)
- No Escape (2012)
- Don't Look Now (2013)
- Strangelets (2013)
- Don't let go (2014)

== Reception ==
=== Boneyard ===
"Boneyard is a winner! A compelling page-turner.", Jeffery Deaver, New York Times bestselling author

"From its harrowing prologue to its haunting last paragraph, Michelle Gagnon masterfully crafts a stellar work of mounting suspense and terror. Ritual murder, ancient magic and buried secrets...all blend seamlessly in this debut mystery by a major new talent. Not to be missed!", James Rollins, New York Times bestselling author of Black Order

"...Gagnon will be as hot someday as the authors who give her cover blurbs...once I got about three chapters into the book, I wasn't putting it down for much of anything. There's no doubt that Gagnon is getting into her stride, spinning a smooth, plot-driven police procedural with the lab and psych details neatly stitched in place...", Kingdom Books, Vermont

=== The Gatekeeper ===
"High stakes, tension, excitement-I loved The Gatekeeper", New York Times bestelling author Lee Child

=== Kidnap & Ransom ===
"Gagnon's fourth novel is arguably her best yet. The rapid-fire pace, detailed characterization, and terrific action scenes will engage anyone looking for the perfect book to read on an airplane or in an easy chair.", RT Reviews

"Michelle Gagnon has again given readers an intense, fast-paced crime thriller with characters we've come to know and care about over the course of this series. She ratchets up the suspense for a powerful ending.", Tanzey Cutter, Fresh Fiction

=== Persefone trilogy ===
"Gagnon's YA debut is a pulse-pounding scray-great read... [that] will have teens begging for more. Girl With the Dragon Tattoo for preteens and teens, a surefire hit.", Kirkus Reviews

"A tight, well-written thriller from a best-selling adult writer. The action and the developments come fast and furious all the way to the end.", School Library Journal

"Gagnon closes her Don't Turn Around trilogy with a suspenseful page-turner that will have fans cheering. Not to be missed.", Kirkus Reviews
