= Transience (short story) =

1949 short story by Arthur C. Clarke

- Short story by Arthur C. Clarke
- Cover of the July 1949 issue of Startling Stories
- Country: United States
- Language: English
- Genre: Science-fiction

Publication
- Published in: Startling Stories
- Publication type: Magazine
- Publication date: July 1949

"Transience" is a science fiction short story by English writer Arthur C. Clarke, first published in 1949 in the magazine Startling Stories. It was later collected in The Other Side of the Sky and The Nine Billion Names of God.

== Summary ==
The story is told through scenes of three children playing on the same beach on Earth, but across vast gulfs of time.

== Development ==
Clarke wrote that the story was inspired by one of A. E. Housman's poems as well as his childhood memories.

== Release ==
"Transience" was first published in the July 1949 issue of Startling Stories. The Beechhurst Press later published in the anthology volume Looking Forward in 1953. The story was also published in collections of some of Clarke's work such as 1958's The Other Side of the Sky and 1961's From the Ocean, from the Stars. In 2001 the University of Western Australia Press published "Transience" in the anthology Earth is But a Star: Excursions Through Science Fiction to the Far Future.

"Transience" has been translated into four languages, Dutch, French, German, and Serbian.

== Themes ==
Per Gary Westfahl, "Transience" is one of relatively few works by Clarke that mention the theme of terraforming. Other themes in "Transience" include the passing of culture and time, the end of the world, and "the sea as seen".

== Reception ==
John Hollow has described "Transience" as "more meditation than story". In a review for the 2001 collection Earth is But a Star: Excursions Through Science Fiction to the Far Future, Jennifer Burwell favorably compared it to Pamela Zoline's "The Heat Death of the Universe" and noted that the story "barely hints at the circumstances that ultimately lead to humans abandoning their home on earth. Clarke at once invites the reader to immerse herself in the melancholy sensibility of the story, and invited to take the active role of a detective searching between the lines to uncover."

== Adaptations ==
The story has been adapted into a musical piece The Tentacles of the Dark Nebula by David Bedford.
