= Scott James (writer) =

Journalist and author

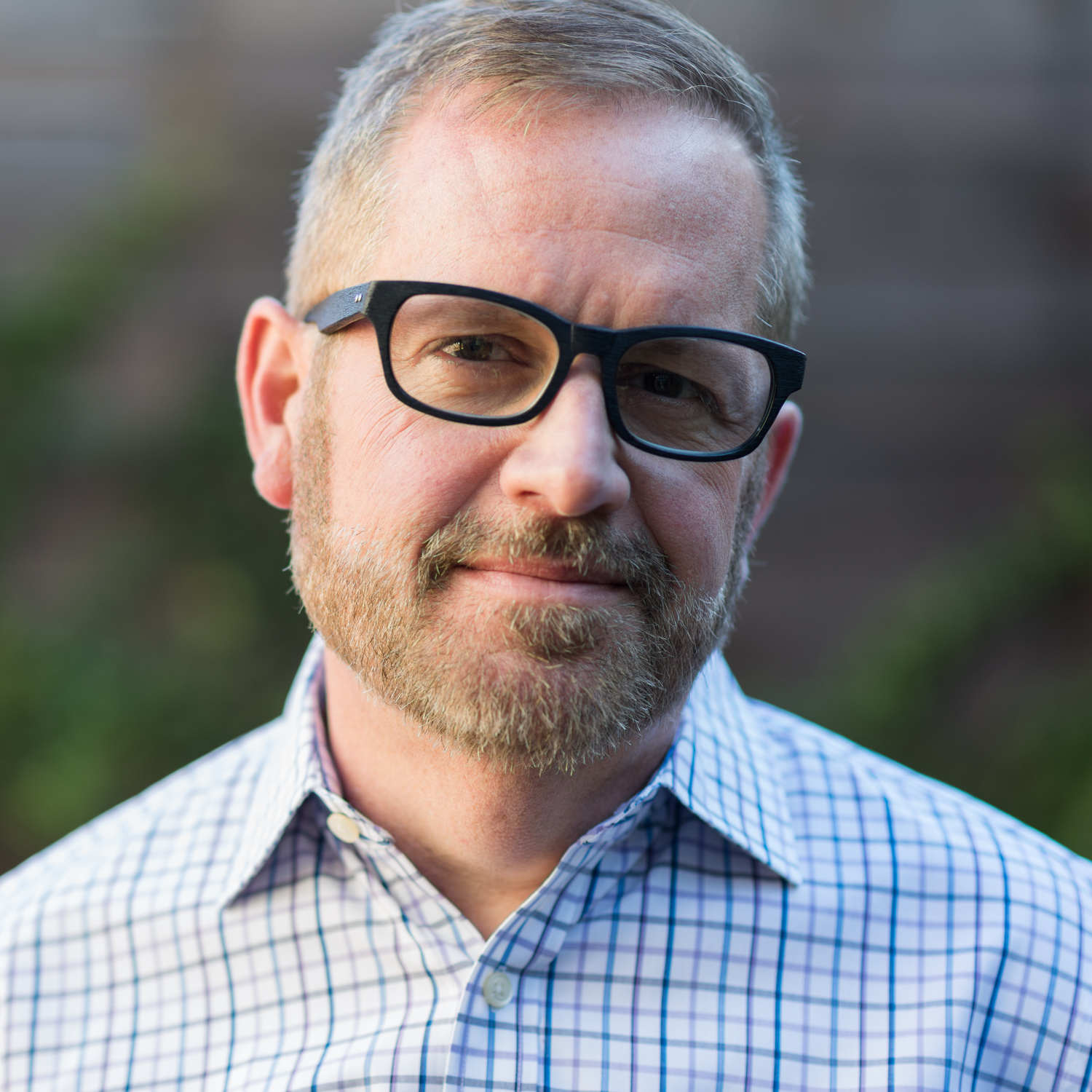
- Scott James, photographed by Ian Tuttle
- Born: 1962 (age 63–64)
- Education: Columbia University Graduate School of Journalism; Adelphi University (BA)
- Occupations: Journalist, novelist
- Writing career
- Notable works: Trial by Fire (2020), SoMa (2007), The Sower (2009)
- Notable awards: 2008 Lambda Literary Award Finalist for Debut Fiction; 1993 - 1995 Three Emmy awards for television news.
- Website: www.scottjameswriter.com

Scott James (born 1962) is a veteran journalist and bestselling author. His reporting has often appeared in The New York Times, and he is the recipient of three Emmy awards for his work in television news.

His most recent book is Trial by Fire: A Devastating Tragedy, 100 Lives Lost, and a 15-Year Search for Truth (Thomas Dunne Books/St. Martin’s Press, October 27, 2020). In a blend of narrative nonfiction and investigative reporting, the book tells the story of the 2003 Station nightclub fire, when the rock band Great White lit off fireworks inside a small club, igniting an inferno that killed 100 people. The disaster is the deadliest rock concert in United States history, and America’s deadliest single building fire following the nationwide adoption of improved fire prevention standards in the aftermath of the Beverly Hills Supper Club fire that killed 165 people in 1977.

In the book, several of the tragedy's key figures were interviewed about the fire for the first time, including the nightclub’s owners, Jeffrey and Michael Derderian, who were convicted in the 100 deaths.

== Critical response ==
In a starred review, Publishers Weekly called Trial by Fire “gripping” and “essential reading for true crime fans.”

The book was noted for the level of intimacy with its central subjects, where the story is told through their close points of view. A review in Kirkus Reviews described the reporting as “Rashomon territory,” and added, "The author’s account is minutely detailed, its technical discussions punctuated by human-interest-story portraits of the victims.”

== Career ==
As news director of WLNE-TV in Providence, Rhode Island, James created the long-running investigative series “You Paid for It,” which exposed government waste and corruption. James received three Emmy awards and numerous journalism honors for his work at the station, including twice the Associated Press News Station of the Year award. Earlier in his career James worked at KODE-TV in Joplin, Missouri, KJRH-TV in Tulsa, Oklahoma, and interned at NBC’s “Today” in New York.

In 2009 James began writing for The New York Times. His eponymous weekly column about the San Francisco Bay Area ran in the newspaper’s Bay Area pages from 2009 to 2012, part of that time in partnership with The Bay Citizen, a non-profit news organization. James’s stories received national and international coverage from other media, including The New Yorker, The Guardian, “The Colbert Report,” and “Chelsea Lately.”

James has continued to report for The New York Times as a contributor.

== As novelist ==
James has written fiction under the pen name Kemble Scott. He is the author of two San Francisco Chronicle bestselling novels, The Sower (Numina Press, 2009) and SoMa (Kensington, 2007), a finalist for the national Lambda Literary prize for debut fiction.

== Education ==
James is a graduate of the Columbia University Graduate School of Journalism. He received his BA from Adelphi University.

== Personal life ==
A New England native, James lives in San Francisco and is a member of the board of directors of Litquake, the city’s literary festival, and co-founder of the Castro Writers’ Cooperative, a co-working community for writers.
