= Human safari (terror campaign) =

Russian terror campaign in Kherson

- Part of Russian invasion of Ukraine
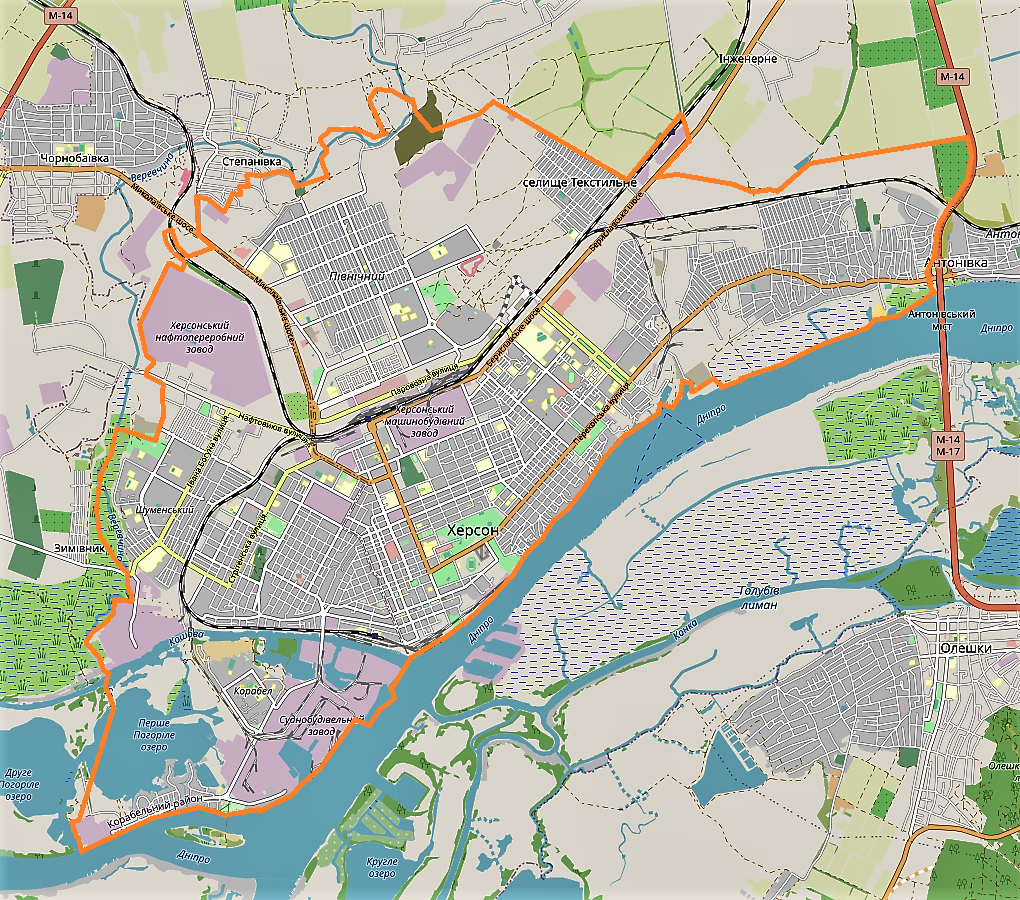
- Location: Kherson, Kherson Oblast, Ukraine
- Date: May 2024 – present
- Target: Ukrainian civilians
- Deaths: 200 civilians (per UN estimate, October 2025)
- Injuries: 2,000 civilians (per UN estimate, October 2025)
- Perpetrator: Russia
- Motive: Anti-Ukrainian sentiment, Russian irredentism, terrorism

The human safari is a Russian campaign of deliberate terrorism against civilians in Kherson, Ukraine. Russian military units, since May 2024, utilize drones fitted with hand grenades and other explosives to purposefully target Ukrainian civilians during the ongoing Russian invasion of Ukraine. According to a UN human rights commission report from October 2025, at least 200 civilians have been killed and over 2,000 have been wounded by Russian-operated drones in Kherson.

Due to these actions, a UN report concluded there was a high probability that the Russian Armed Forces was guilty of murder, forced transfer, terror, attacks on civilians and outrages upon personal dignity which amount to war crimes and crimes against humanity. A Human Rights Watch (HRW) report concurred and found Russian armed forces guilty of attacks on civilians, murder and terror as war crimes and crimes against humanity.

The term "human safari" was first used in publication by journalist Zarina Zabrisky in a Kyiv Post article. The Russian practice of deliberately killing Ukrainian civilians using drones has since received broad coverage by media. Footage of the attacks is often shared and celebrated on Russian social media channels, with research published by Zabrisky finding that many drones used in the attacks had been obtained through fundraisers organized by Russian civilians.

== Background ==
The Ukrainian city of Kherson had previously been occupied by Russia in 2022 during the Russian invasion of Ukraine, but was later liberated by Ukrainian forces. Following the liberation, Russian forces positioned across the river less than a kilometer away from the shores of the city and targeted residents with sniper, missile and artillery attacks.

Because of the close proximity of Russian forces enabling the use of drones in the attacks, the Washington Post described the situation in Kherson as atypical, since in the rest of Ukraine, Russia must use longer-range weapons to hit civilians. Kherson locals have described the Russian strikes from across the river as a kind of "punishment", because Kherson was the first major Ukrainian city captured by Russia to be liberated by Ukrainian forces.

== Civilian targeting ==
Parts of Kherson remained "somewhat safe" as residents managed to hide from Russian attacks by moving behind their buildings or to north-facing apartments. However, Russians started sending in small drones instead to attack the city. According to the Kyiv Post, half of the Kherson casualties in July and August were caused by drones, with up to 100 attacks per day. Roman Mrochko, the head of the military authority in Kherson, suggested that the Russians are training drone pilots on Kherson's civilians.

In June 2026, on the 9th and 18th respectively, the administrators of the Russian channel "From Mariupol to Carpathians" reported the death of two prominent members of the group, "Alexandr" (possibly Sheptura) and then another "brother".

=== Etymology ===
Following the continued deliberate targeting of Ukrainian civilians, Kherson locals started referring to the terror campaign as a "human safari". The term was first named in publication by journalist Zarina Zabrisky who detailed conditions in Kherson as civilians faced constant drone attack.

== Casualties ==
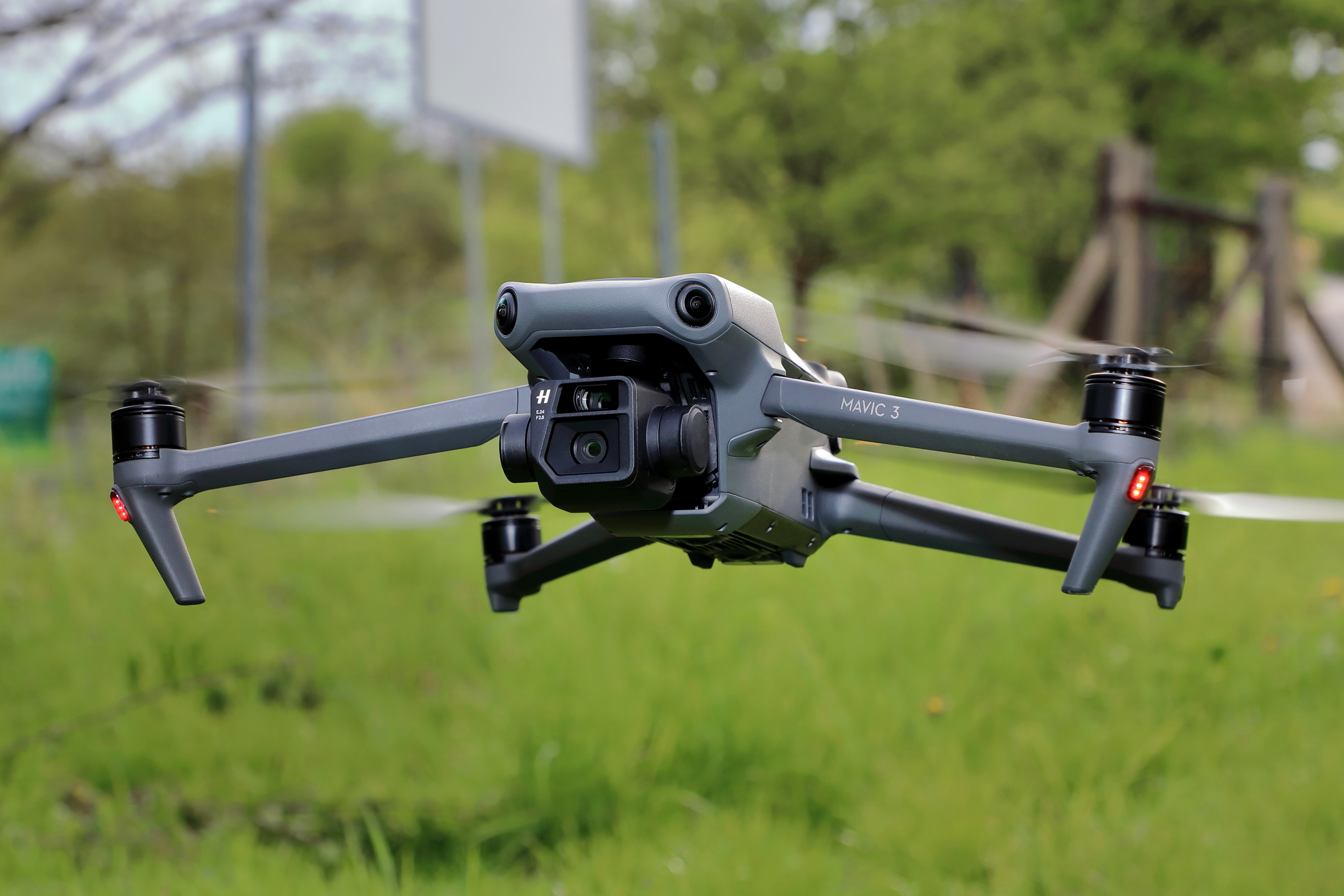
A DJI Mavic, one of the types of drones used to target civilians

A representative from the Kherson military administration said nearly half of the 547 casualties reported from 1 July to 9 September 2024 were caused by drones. As of April 2025, this includes 121 civilian casualties according to the Kherson Prosecutors Office.

Ukraine's TSN news programme reported a record high of 330 drone strikes and 224 explosive drops on 9 September. On 31 October, the military administration said that 30 civilians had been killed by drone attacks in Kherson since 1 July. In the same period, more than 5,000 drone attacks had been recorded resulting in over 400 injured civilians.

== Civilian targets ==
Civilian targets have included people waiting at bus stops, commuters, children playing in parks, schools, public buses, civilian cars, and ambulances. Russian drones using a napalm-like mixture to burn down entire neighbourhoods have also been reported. Local volunteers and experts have reported "double tap" strikes hitting first responders and sappers, and preventing firefighters from responding.

In what was described as a "typical case" by Forbes, a mother-of-two was cycling home when she was spotted by a Russian drone, as she started pedaling as fast as she could she realized that the drone had started following her. Eventually it dropped a grenade which brushed the woman's body before exploding at her feet, injuring her with shrapnel and leaving her unable to walk. Imagery of the attack was posted on a Russian Telegram with a winking face emoji and a comment incorrectly describing her as a "soldier".

In another example, footage shared publicly by Russian forces showed an explosive being dropped on a UN refugee agency vehicle. The BBC described a man having recently returned home from work stepping into his yard outside, lighting a cigarette and chatting with his neighbour before they heard the sound of a drone buzzing. The man's wife says she saw him run and take cover as the drone dropped a grenade, but he died at the scene because shrapnel had pierced his heart.

In January 2025, Iryna Sokur, director of the Kherson Oncological Hospital, described drone attacks on patients, hospital staff and ambulances. Two ambulances were burnt on 11 November 2024, with a third being struck the next day. On 26 November, the head of the hospital lab was killed on her way to work. She also described one man being killed in his car while waiting in the parking lot to pick up a relative after their treatment. Sokur has herself been chased by drones twice. In early winter, almost all patients were evacuated as the situation became untenable, and the hospital was eventually destroyed by two Russian glide bombs on 20 December.

On 10 July 2025, local authorities said a one-year-old boy who was staying with his great-grandmother in Pravdyne had been struck by a Russian drone. The child died on the scene from injuries sustained from the explosion, and his grandmother was injured. The attack was part of a wider attack on Kherson, which wounded 17 people across the region. Shortly after the attack, Ukraine's General Staff reported that the building the Russian drone crew responsible for the killing of the toddler were using had been identified by Ukrainian military intelligence, which subsequently launched FPV drones impacting the building, with further monitoring showing no further drone launches from the site following the strikes. Regional governor Oleksandr Prokudin expressed gratitude following the operation, saying "Dmytro should never have been a target. I thank our soldiers for their just retribution. No occupier who brought death and destruction to our land will escape punishment."

The Atlantic Council reported that an 84-year-old goat herder had been struck and killed by a Russian drone while tending to her animals on 20 October 2025. Zarina Zabrisky told the Euromaidan Press that she had interviewed the woman, Larysa Vakuliuk, weeks earlier, where she had explained that she refused to evacuate because she felt responsible for her animals.

On 26 November 2025, the Ukrainian News Agency reported that a Russian drone struck a civilian car, killing a woman and a six-year-old child and injuring the driver. On 2 February 2026, Prokudin said that Russian drones attacked an ambulance, resulting in the driver suffering mild injuries. On 4 February, he said a nurse had been killed after being attacked by a Russian FPV drone. On 6 February, another attack was reported by Prokudin, who said that an evacuation vehicle had been attacked by Russian drones as volunteers were trying to rescue people in Beryslav, resulting in one person being killed and three injured. On 11 March, Prokudin said a Russian drone struck a civilian bus during daytime, resulting in 10 people being injured. On 14 April, regional prosecutors said that a Russian drone struck and killed an elderly woman.

On 1 July 2026, regional authorities said that a Russian drone struck a civilian minibus during the morning rush hour, resulting in two people being killed and nine injured. Prokudin said that the Russian drone operator clearly saw that it was a civilian vehicle but deliberately chose to strike it anyway, referring to the operator as a ″terrorist″.

On 4 August 2026, Ukrainian police released footage showing a Russian drone chasing a Kherson street vendor before exploding as the victim dove for cover. The police said that the man survived, but suffered blast and shrapnel injuries. Ukraine's Foreign Minister Andrii Sybiha referred to the attack as a ″barbaric Russian war crime that demands international condemnation and justice″, while adding that ″thousands of similar crimes never come to the public eye″.

On 19 August 2026, the Kherson Regional Prosecutor's Office said a Russian drone struck a civilian car, killing a woman and injuring two people. The same day, Ukrainian President Volodymyr Zelenskyy condemned the ″safari″ after Ukrainian authorities also said that a Russian drone struck a minibus in the city, killing three women and one man.

On 14 September 2026, the Kherson Regional Military Administration reported that a Russian ″Lancet″ drone had struck a car in the village of Nova Kuban, injuring two women.

The defence company BlueBird Tech designed a net gun intended for civilians targeted by the human safari, which allows them to fire a net at a drone targeting them, entangling the drone. Each launcher can be used only once. The net gun was intentionally classified as a "non-firearm" so that civilians could obtain it without a license.

== Incitement and funding by Russian civilians ==
The footage captured during the attacks on Ukrainian civilians are shared and celebrated on Russian social media channels. Research published by Zabrisky found that many of the drones are purchased through fundraisers organized by Russian civilians, and Russian soldiers share drone footage showcasing Ukrainian deaths online so that supporters of the fundraisers can see their "return on investment". Pop music is sometimes added to the footage.

The BBC identified a Telegram channel with the earliest public footage of some of the drone attacks, each of the videos were posted with goading and threats to the Ukrainian public. Injured people were also insulted being called "pigs", and in one instance mocked for being a woman. The same account had also shared images of drones and other equipment, thanking people for donations.

On 23 March 2025 Ukrainian channel "Telebachenia Toronto" published an investigation into the identities of the most prominent Russian UAV pilots engaged in the "human safari" who came out to be Sergei Iordan ('Malakhit'), Eduard Yust ('Moisey'), both from the 8th Artillery Regiment, Yegor Afanasenkov (22nd Brigade GRU) and Aleksandr Sheptura (205th Brigade).

== Investigations ==
Multiple International, human rights groups, and local law enforcement organizations have investigated the claims of a human safari in Kherson. These reports found the human safari to mean Russia had committed war crimes. The Kherson Prosecutor's Office has also launched over 1,000 official investigations.

=== United Nations ===
A May 2025 report by the Office of the United Nations High Commissioner for Human Rights (OHCHR) examined these crimes in Kherson and found the Russian Armed Forces guilty of murder, forced transfer, attacks on civilians and outrages upon personal dignity which amount to war crimes and crimes against humanity. The attacks were deemed widespread and aimed against the civilian population. The report concluded:

The civilian population in the areas affected by drone attacks lives in constant fear. Residents take risks every time they go outside, as they fear being struck by drones. Many wait for cloudy days to go out, or seek cover under trees, where possible. Fear is further induced by frequent messages posted on Telegram, such as "Get out of the city before the leaves fall, you who are destined to die." The circumstances of the attacks, the videos, and the explicit threatening text posts demonstrate that Russian armed forces and those supporting them have committed acts or threats of violence for the primary purpose of spreading terror among the civilian population, in violation of international humanitarian law. Referring to Russian soldiers, a senior health professional of a hospital in Kherson said: "They are simply chasing and hunting civilians who are on their way to work or walking their dogs. They drop explosives from drones like it is a video game." The scale and intensity of the drone attacks against civilians and civilian objects as well as the destruction of houses and basic infrastructure, the targeting of all means of transport, and attacks against emergency and rescue services, have all rendered the affected areas unliveable and left many residents with no other choice than to flee. The recurrent drone attacks, the widely disseminated videos showing them, and numerous posts explicitly exhorting the population to leave suggest a coordinated state policy, on the part of the Russian authorities, to force the population of Kherson Province to leave the area. The Commission therefore concludes that Russian armed forces may have committed the crime against humanity of forcible transfer of population.

=== Human Rights Watch ===
In June 2025, Human Rights Watch published a report on the targeting of civilians in Kherson by Russian UAV pilots. The researchers Human Rights Watch documented 45 drone strikes in Antonivka and Dniprosvkyi that suggested that civilians and civilian objects including infrastructure get targeted.

Human Rights Watch drew on multiple sources, including interviewing 36 survivors and witnesses. They identified Russian Telegram channels used to promote the terrorist attacks. This included posting of receipts as proof of fundraising support.

The report concluded the attacks were war crimes:

International humanitarian law, also known as the laws of war, prohibits attacks intentionally targeting civilians and civilian objects. Nevertheless, Russian forces using drones have frequently made individual civilians and civilian property and infrastructure in Kherson the targets of attacks. Russian drones have been armed with banned antipersonnel landmines and been used to carry out attacks with incendiary weapons in populated areas, which is unlawful. Such attacks, when viewed individually, are violations of the laws of war that when committed with criminal intent constitute war crimes. Examined in their totality and over time, the pattern of attacks appears to be part of an apparent Russian strategy whose primary purpose has been to spread terror among the civilian population.

=== Centre for Information Resilience ===
The Centre for Information Resilience published a report on the drone attacks targeting civilians in December 2024, This included the dropping of anti-personnel mines in civilian areas. The report concluded there was a high probability Russian troops were using civilians for target practice during "live-fire exercises".

=== Kherson Prosecutor's Office ===
Since 1 February 2022, the Kherson Prosecutor's Office has opened 1,650 criminal cases over Russian drone attacks in Kherson. Kherson Regional Prosecutor's Office Oleksiy Butenko noted these represent a pattern of deliberate terrorism. According to Oleksiy Butenk:

Russians are hunting civilians, they can move by bicycle or on foot, dressed without any signs that could take them to the military. The operator of the drone in real time realizes who he throws explosives on, and therefore deliberately commits terror against civilians.

== See also ==
- Russian attacks on civilians in the Russo-Ukrainian war (2022–present)
- Russian war crimes
- Sarajevo Safari
