= The Other Side of the Sky =

1958 collection of science fiction short stories by Arthur C. Clarke

- Cover of the first edition
- Author: Arthur C. Clarke
- Cover artist: Edward Sorel
- Language: English
- Genre: Science fiction
- Publisher: Harcourt Brace
- Publication date: 1958
- Publication place: United States
- Media type: Print (hardcover)
- Pages: 245
- ISBN: 0-451-14937-8

For the Memoir by Farah Ahmedi, See The Other Side of the Sky: A Memoir

The Other Side of the Sky is a collection of science fiction short stories by English writer Arthur C. Clarke, originally published in 1958. The stories all originally appeared in a number of different publications.

== Contents ==
- Bibliographical Note
- "The Nine Billion Names of God"
- "Refugee"
- The Other Side of the Sky (vignettes):
  - "Special Delivery"
  - "Feathered Friends"
  - "Take a Deep Breath"
  - "Freedom of Space"
  - "Passer-by"
  - "The Call of the Stars"
- "The Wall of Darkness"
- "Security Check"
- "No Morning After"
- Venture to the Moon (vignettes):
  - "The Starting Line"
  - "Robin Hood, F.R.S."
  - "Green Fingers"
  - "All That Glitters"
  - "Watch This Space"
  - "A Question of Residence"
- "Publicity Campaign"
- "All the Time in the World"
- "Cosmic Casanova"
- "The Star"
- "Out of the Sun"
- "Transience"
- "The Songs of Distant Earth"

== Reception ==
Floyd C. Gale wrote that "too many [trick endings] are more than enough", but that there were "several superlative items", citing the "Venture to the Moon" and "The Other Side of the Sky" story headings. He described the paperback edition as "A double dozen of Clarke's best short-shorts, all tricky". Damon Knight, although dismissing the vignettes as "without exception remarkably trivial," reported that the other stories "include some of Clarke's best work."

== Sources ==
- Tuck, Donald H. (1974). The Encyclopedia of Science Fiction and Fantasy. Chicago: Advent. p. 102. ISBN 0-911682-20-1.
