= Premium Rush =

- Theatrical release poster
- Directed by: David Koepp
- Written by: David Koepp; John Kamps
- Produced by: Gavin Polone
- Starring: Joseph Gordon-Levitt; Michael Shannon; Dania Ramirez; Jamie Chung
- Cinematography: Mitchell Amundsen
- Edited by: Derek Ambrosi; Jill Savitt
- Music by: David Sardy
- Production companies: Columbia Pictures; Pariah
- Distributed by: Sony Pictures Releasing
- Release date: August 24, 2012
- Running time: 92 minutes
- Country: United States
- Language: English
- Budget: $35 million
- Box office: $31.1 million

Premium Rush is a 2012 American action thriller film directed by David Koepp and written by Koepp and John Kamps. The film stars Joseph Gordon-Levitt, Michael Shannon, Dania Ramirez, and Jamie Chung. It follows a bicycle messenger chased around New York City by a corrupt police officer who wants an envelope the messenger has. It was released on August 24, 2012.

The film received generally positive reviews, with an overall approval rating of 75% at Rotten Tomatoes.

== Plot ==
Wilee is a disenchanted Columbia Law School graduate who has put off taking the bar exam, dreading the humdrum life of the legal profession. He enjoys working as a New York City bicycle messenger, despite arguments with his ex-girlfriend and fellow bike messenger, Vanessa, who insists that he should make something of himself.

Vanessa's roommate Nima exchanges her savings of $50,000 to Mr. Leung, a Chinese hawaladar, for a ticket. The ticket is to be given to Sister Chen as payment for Chen's gang smuggling her son and mother into the United States.

Robert Monday, a gambling addict, learns of the ticket, which can be returned to Mr. Leung for the money. He approaches Nima, who already hired Wilee to deliver it to Sister Chen. He attempts to trick Wilee into giving him the ticket, but Wilee refuses.

Wilee rides off, with Monday in pursuit. Wilee heads to the police station only to find out Monday is a police detective. Thinking he is delivering something illegal, Wilee informs his dispatcher Raj that he cancels the delivery. Returning to Nima's college, Wilee leaves the envelope, which is picked up by his rival, Manny.

With the delivery receipt stolen from Nima, Monday calls the dispatch to redirect the delivery to a different address. Wilee runs into Nima and confronts her about the ticket, and she reveals the truth. Wilee catches up to Manny, who refuses to give Wilee his drop. They race each other and are chased by a bike cop who had earlier tried to arrest Wilee.

Near Monday's address, the bike cop tackles Manny off his bike and arrests him. Vanessa, who had learned of Monday's trickery and raced over gives Manny's bag to Wilee. As they are about to escape, Wilee is hit by a taxi, and fractures several ribs. He is put in an ambulance with Monday, while his damaged bike is taken to an impound lot, with the envelope hidden in the handlebars.

Monday tortures Wilee, who asks for his bike back. Wilee tells Monday that the envelope is in Manny's bag, and Monday leaves to search for it, while Wilee meets with Vanessa in the impound lot. She gives him the envelope, which she had retrieved, and he escapes on a stolen bike. Monday, realizing Wilee has tricked him, pursues Wilee to Sister Chen's place.

Meanwhile, Nima calls Mr. Leung for help. He deploys his enforcer, the Sudoku Man, to help her. As Wilee reaches Chinatown, Monday confronts and threatens to kill him, but Vanessa arrives with a mob of messengers, dispatched by Raj, who distract Monday. Wilee delivers the ticket to Sister Chen, who tells the captain of her ship to allow Nima's family aboard. Monday is confronted by Chinese and Italian mobsters and doesn't notice Sudoku Man, who shoots Monday in the back of his head using a Sudoku book to silence the pistol. Monday tries to get in his car but dies before he can do so.

Nima's mother calls her and confirms that she and Nima's son have gotten on the ship. Nima meets with Wilee and Vanessa while they are finally reunited. Sometime later, Wilee is back on his job stating one day he might settle in a firm job but does not feel ready yet.

== Cast ==
- Joseph Gordon-Levitt as Wilee, a bicycle messenger
- Michael Shannon as Robert "Bobby" Monday, a corrupt gambling-addicted police detective
- Dania Ramirez as Vanessa, Wilee's ex-girlfriend, and bike messenger
- Jamie Chung as Nima, Vanessa's roommate
- Wolé Parks as Manny, Wilee's rival
- Aasif Mandvi as Raj, Wilee's dispatcher
- Ashley Austin Morris as a receptionist
- Christopher Place as Roselli (credited as Bike Cop)
- Henry O as Mr. Leung
- Boyce Wong as Mr. Lin
- Brian Koppelman as Loan Shark
- Kevin Bolger as Squid
- BoJun Wang as Nima's Son
- Sean Kennedy as Marco
- Kym Perfetto as Polo
- Anthony Chisholm as Tito
- Lauren Ashley Carter as Phoebe
- Aaron Tveit as Kyle
- Darlene Violette as Debra
- Mario D'Leon as Moosey
- Djani Johnson as Johnny
- Wai Ching Ho as Sister Chen
- Kin Shing Wong as Sudoku Man

== Production ==
Writer director David Koepp developed Premium Rush and co-wrote the screenplay with John Kamps. They aimed to have elaborate chase sequences like in a William Friedkin film.

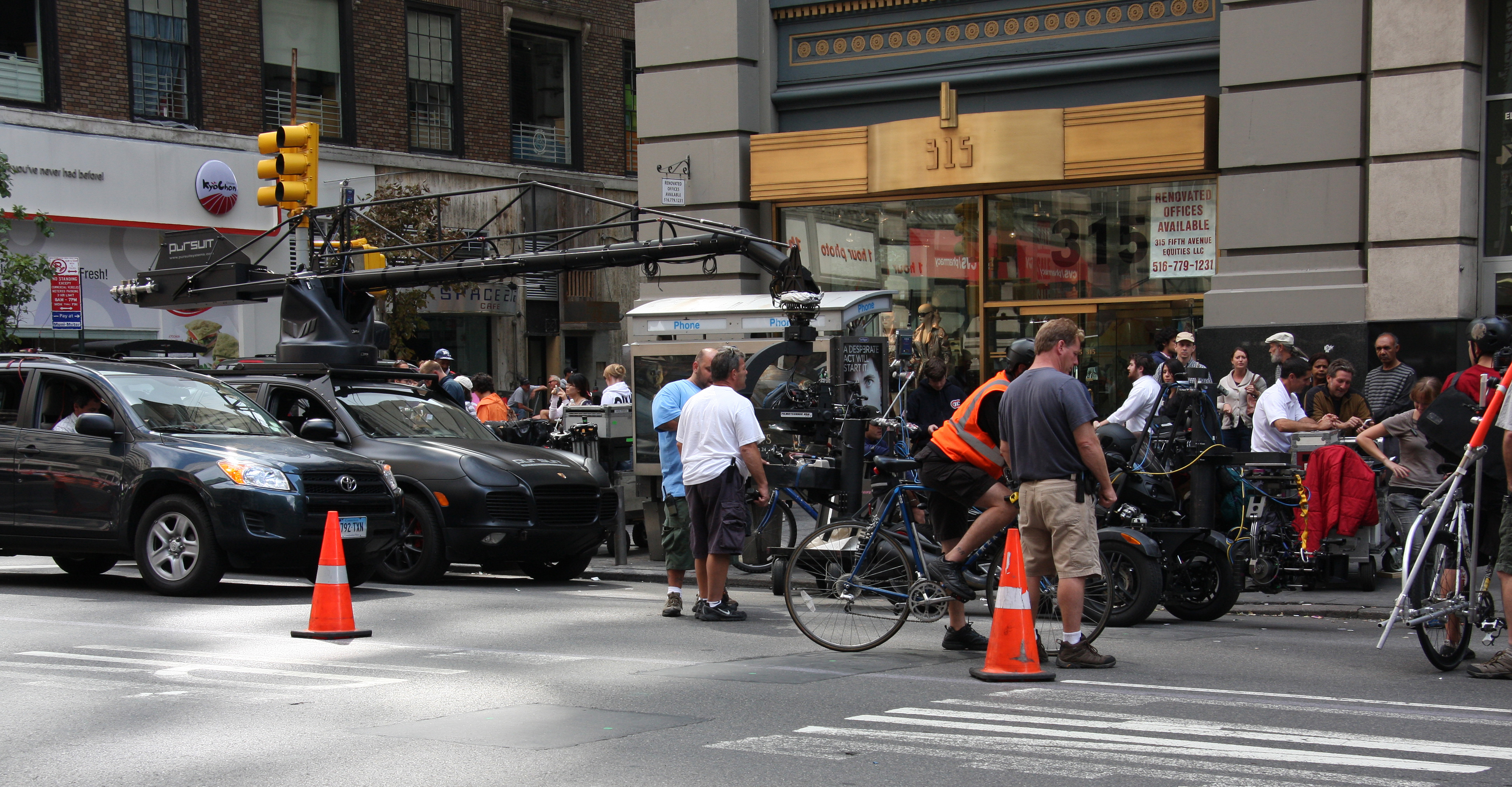
Film crew preparing to shoot a scene at the intersection of 5th Avenue and West 34th Street (beneath the Empire State Building)

Principal photography began in mid-July 2010 and ended by early September 2010 in New York City. Gordon-Levitt was injured during filming on August 1, 2010, when he rode into the back of a taxi. The impact sent Gordon-Levitt flying into the rear windshield of the taxi, slashing his arm which required 31 stitches. A shot of the aftermath of that accident is included as a scene during the credits of the film. Locations included Columbia University, Central Park and Canal Street.

== Lawsuit ==
In 2011, a lawsuit was filed in the Northern District of California by author Joe Quirk, claiming Premium Rush was based on his 1998 novel The Ultimate Rush. The suit claimed many plot, character name, and scene similarities to Quirk's original novel. In July 2012, U.S. District Judge Richard Seeborg declined to dismiss Quirk's claim that Sony Pictures, parent company of Columbia Pictures, had breached an implied contract. The production company Pariah, director David Koepp and co-screenwriter John Kamps were also named in the suit. On April 2, 2013, Judge Seeborg dismissed this case, finding that the two works were not substantially similar.

== Reception ==
=== Box office ===
In its opening weekend, Premium Rush opened at #8, grossing $6 million. The film grossed $20.3 million in North America while grossing $10.8 million in foreign markets, totaling a worldwide income of $31.1 million, against a production budget of $35 million.

=== Critical response ===
On Rotten Tomatoes the film has an approval rating of 75% based on 165 reviews, with an average rating of 6.30/10. The site's critical consensus reads, "It's built out of familiar parts, but no matter how formulaic Premium Rush's storyline might seem, it's elevated by high-octane action and enjoyable performances." On Metacritic, the film has a score of 66 out of 100, based on 36 critics, indicating "generally favorable reviews". Audiences surveyed by CinemaScore gave the film a grade B on scale of A to F.

Chicago Sun-Times critic Roger Ebert awarded the film 3.5 stars out of 4, calling it a "breakneck chase movie".

== See also ==
- List of films about bicycles and cycling
