= Rodriguez et al. v. Google LLC =

Privacy class action legal case

- Court: United States District Court for the Northern District of California
- Full case name: Anibal Rodriguez et al. v. Google LLC
- Docket nos.: 3:20-cv-04688-RS

Case history
- Prior actions: Motion to dismiss granted in part and denied in part (May 21, 2021); remaining CIPA and contract claims dismissed (January 25, 2022); class certified (January 3, 2024); class definition clarified (April 5, 2024); summary judgment denied (January 7, 2025); jury verdict for plaintiffs (September 3, 2025)
- Subsequent actions: Further proceedings ongoing; appeal anticipated

Court membership
- Judge sitting: Richard Seeborg

Case opinions
- Plaintiffs' requests for injunctive relief and disgorgement denied; Google's motion to decertify the class denied
- Decision by: Richard Seeborg

Keywords
- class action; data privacy; invasion of privacy; intrusion upon seclusion; CDAFA; Web & App Activity; Firebase; Google Mobile Ads

Rodriguez et al. v. Google LLC is a privacy class action in the United States District Court for the Northern District of California. Filed on July 14, 2020, the case concerns allegations that Google continued to collect app-activity. In September 2025, a jury found Google liable on two California privacy claims and awarded more than $425 million in compensatory damages.

In January 2026, Judge Richard Seeborg denied the plaintiffs’ requests for injunctive relief and disgorgement and denied Google’s motion to decertify the class, leaving the damages verdict in place.

== Background ==
The plaintiffs alleged that Google’s disclosures led users to believe that turning off Web & App Activity would stop Google from collecting certain data from non-Google mobile apps. The disputed transmissions came from non-Google apps that used Google's Firebase and Google Mobile Ads software development kits. Google acknowledged collecting the data, but argued that, for some users, it was retained only for record-keeping, advertising-service administration, or analytics for app developers.

The named plaintiffs were Anibal Rodriguez, Sal Cataldo, Julian Santiago, and Susan Lynn Harvey. The case proceeded on three California claims: invasion of privacy under the California Constitution, intrusion upon seclusion, and violation of the Comprehensive Computer Data Access and Fraud Act (CDAFA).

== Procedural history ==
In May 2021, Chief Judge Richard Seeborg granted in part and denied in part Google's motion to dismiss. The court allowed the plaintiffs’ section 631 of the California Invasion of Privacy Act (CIPA), CDAFA, intrusion upon seclusion, and the California constitutional privacy claims to proceed, but dismissed the federal Wiretap Act claim, the section 632 CIPA claim, and the Unfair Competition Law claim.

The plaintiffs were represented by a group of firms that included Morgan & Morgan, Boies Schiller Flexner, and Susman Godfrey. Lawyers appearing for the plaintiffs included Morgan & Morgan attorneys John A. Yanchunis and Ryan J. McGee.

In January 2022, the court dismissed the remaining section 631 CIPA claim and the plaintiffs' contract theory. The court held that the complaint still did not adequately plead interception for purposes of section 631 and rejected the argument that use of the Web & App Activity settings created a unilateral contract. The case then proceeded to the California privacy and CDAFA claims, which later went to class certification and trial.

== Class certification ==
On January 3, 2024, the court certified nationwide classes under Rules 23(b)(3) and 23(b)(2). The certified classes covered users who had turned off Web & App Activity, or a related supplemental Web & App Activity setting, but whose activity from non-Google mobile apps was still transmitted to Google through Firebase or Google Mobile Ads SDKs; separate classes were certified for Android and non-Android devices. The ruling affected roughly 100 million Android and iPhone users and about 1.5 million apps.

In April 2024, the court granted in part Google’s motion to clarify the class definition. The ruling did not end class treatment, but modified the definitions in part while the case remained on a class-wide basis.

== Summary judgment and trial ==
On January 7, 2025, the court denied Google’s motion for summary judgment, sending to trial issues including consent, the adequacy of Google’s disclosures, users’ reasonable expectations of privacy, and whether Google’s conduct was highly offensive or unauthorized under California law. The case proceeded to trial in August 2025.

The plaintiffs were represented at trial by lawyers from Morgan & Morgan, Boies Schiller Flexner, and Susman Godfrey. They alleged that Google had accessed and stored app-activity data over an eight-year period after users had disabled the relevant setting. Google argued that the data was pseudonymous and was not linked to users' identities in the manner alleged by the plaintiffs.

== Verdict ==
On September 3, 2025, the jury found Google liable for invasion of privacy and intrusion upon seclusion, but not liable on the CDAFA claim. It awarded $425,651,947 in actual damages and no punitive or nominal damages. In post-trial rulings, the court stated that the jury had also rejected Google’s consent defense.

The certified class included about 98 million Google users and 174 million devices. It also encompassed about 98 million smartphones in the United States used between July 1, 2016, and September 23, 2024, amounting to roughly $4 per device. Google said it would appeal.

== Post-trial proceedings ==
After the verdict, the plaintiffs sought a permanent injunction and $2.36 billion disgorgement, which they characterized as a conservative estimate of Google's profits from the challenged conduct. Google moved to decertify the class and to vacate the verdict.

The plaintiffs' post-trial counsel continued to include Morgan & Morgan, with Yanchunis and McGee appearing alongside David Boies and Mark Mao of Boies Schiller Flexner and Bill Carmody and Shawn Rabin of Susman Godfrey.

On January 30, 2026, Judge Seeborg denied the plaintiffs' request for equitable relief and denied Google's motion to decertify the class. The court held that the plaintiffs had not established entitlement to the requested injunction or disgorgement and rejected Google's effort to undo class treatment. The damages verdict therefore remained in place.

The case remained pending after the January 30, 2026 post-trial order, and Reuters reported that Google planned to appeal.
