= Looking Forward (disambiguation) =

Looking Forward is a 1999 album by Crosby, Stills, Nash & Young.

Looking Forward may also refer to:

- Looking Forward (1910 film), an American silent short drama
- Looking Forward (1933 film), an American pre-Code drama film
- Looking Forward (anthology), an anthology of science fiction stories edited by Milton Lesser
- Looking Forward, a 1933 book by Franklin D. Roosevelt
- a poem from A Child's Garden of Verses by Robert Louis Stevenson
