= Phyllis J. Hamilton =

American judge (born 1952)

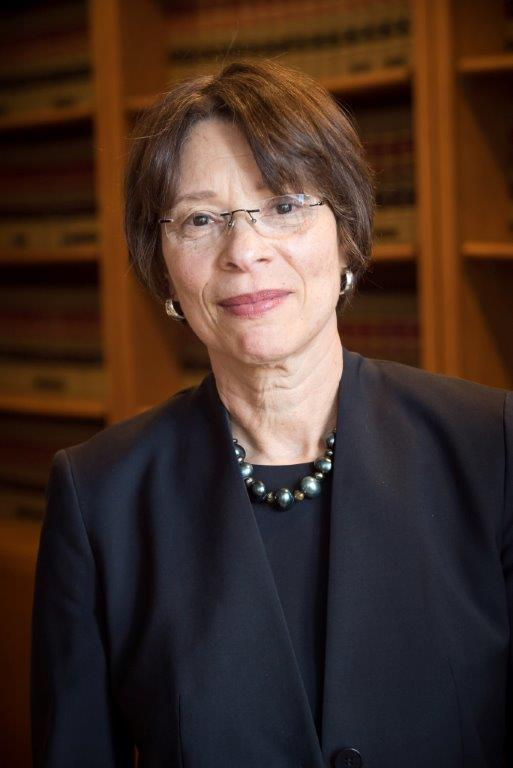

Senior Judge of the United States District Court for the Northern District of California
- Incumbent
- Assumed office February 1, 2021

Chief Judge of the United States District Court for the Northern District of California
- In office December 17, 2014 – February 1, 2021
- Preceded by: Claudia Ann Wilken
- Succeeded by: Richard Seeborg

Judge of the United States District Court for the Northern District of California
- In office May 25, 2000 – February 1, 2021
- Appointed by: Bill Clinton
- Preceded by: Seat established by 104 Stat. 5089
- Succeeded by: Trina Thompson

Magistrate Judge of the United States District Court for the Northern District of California
- In office April 1991 – May 25, 2000

Personal details
- Born: June 12, 1952 (age 73) Jacksonville, Illinois, U.S.
- Education: Stanford University (BA); Santa Clara University (JD)

Phyllis Jean Hamilton (born June 12, 1952) is a senior United States district judge of the United States District Court for the Northern District of California.

== Education and career ==
Hamilton was born in Jacksonville, Illinois. She received a Bachelor of Arts degree from Stanford University in 1974 and a Juris Doctor, cum laude, from Santa Clara University School of Law in 1976. She was a deputy public defender in the California Office of the Public Defender from 1976 to 1980, and briefly served as a manager of EEO Programs for Farinon Electric Corporation in 1980. She became an administrative judge for the San Francisco Regional Office of the United States Merit Systems Protection Board from 1980 to 1985, and was a court commissioner for the Municipal Court, Oakland-Piedmont-Emeryville Judicial District from 1985 to 1991. From 1991 to 2000, Hamilton was a United States magistrate judge of the United States District Court for the Northern District of California.

=== Federal judicial service ===
On February 9, 2000, Hamilton was nominated by President Bill Clinton to a new seat on the United States District Court for the Northern District of California created by 104 Stat. 5089 following the appointment of Fern M. Smith as Director of the Federal Judicial Center. She was confirmed by the United States Senate on May 24, 2000, and received her commission on May 25, 2000. She served as chief judge from December 17, 2014 to February 1, 2021 when she assumed senior status. She was the first African-American chief judge in the court's history.

== See also ==
- List of African-American federal judges
- List of African-American jurists
- List of first women lawyers and judges in California

== Sources ==
- Confirmation hearings on federal appointments : hearings before the Committee on the Judiciary, United States Senate, One Hundred Sixth Congress, first session, on confirmation of appointees to the federal judiciary. pt.2 (1999)

Legal offices
Preceded by Seat established by 104 Stat. 5089	Judge of the United States District Court for the Northern District of California; 2000–2021	Succeeded by Trina Thompson
Preceded by Claudia Ann Wilken	Chief Judge of the United States District Court for the Northern District of California; 2014–2021	Succeeded by Richard Seeborg
