= Venture to the Moon =

1956 short story collection by Arthur C. Clarke

- Author: Arthur C. Clarke
- Language: English
- Genre: Science fiction
- Publisher: Evening Standard
- Publication date: May 1956
- Publication place: United Kingdom

Venture to the Moon is a group of six linked science fiction short stories by English writer Arthur C. Clarke. It was originally published in the British newspaper Evening Standard in 1956. The stories describe the first crewed mission to the Moon in 1975, as a joint American-Russian-British mission, and are narrated in first person from the point of view of the British team commander. Despite the death described in the third story, they are written in a humorous vein. They are collected in The Other Side of the Sky.

== Plot summary ==
- "The Starting Line" tells of the launch of the first lunar expedition jointly by British, American and Russian rockets which have been assembled in Earth orbit. The plan is for all three ships to leave Earth orbit and land simultaneously, but the narrator has secretly been ordered to depart ahead of the other two ships.
- "Robin Hood FRS" tells of the efforts by the joint expedition members to recover an automatic supply rocket that has landed just out of reach, through the unorthodox method of utilising one team member's archery skills.
- "Green Fingers" describes how a Russian team member - a botanist - secretly engineers plant life that could survive on the Moon's surface, and the accident that causes his death.
- "All that Glitters" deals with a geophysicist who discovers diamonds on the Moon - only to learn that back on Earth, synthetic diamonds have just been successfully created at negligible cost.
- "Watch this Space" tells how a scientific experiment conducted on the Moon - creating a giant sodium cloud that is made luminescent by the Sun's rays and visible from Earth - is sabotaged by "the greatest advertising coup" in history (strongly implied to be by Coca-Cola).
- "A Question of Residence" tells of how at the end of the mission one of the ships would have to stay behind to clean up their equipment while the others return and get the early glory, and how the British team end up volunteering... in order to take advantage of a legal loophole so they can sell their stories tax-free.

== Reception ==
Damon Knight dismissed the stories as "remarkably trivial."
