= Joe Quirk =

American writer

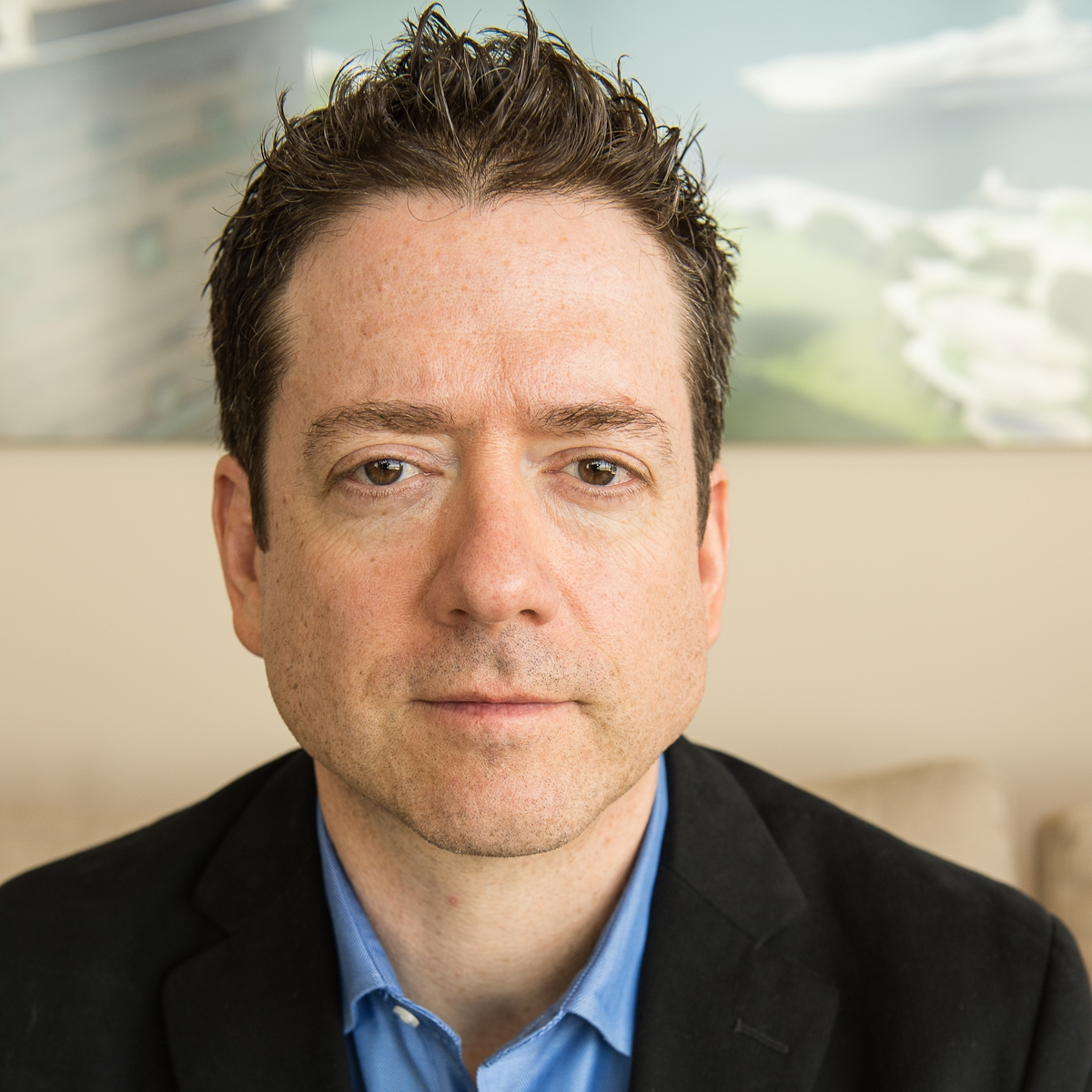
- Seasteading Institute press photo, in 2015

Joe Quirk is an American author originally from Westfield, New Jersey. His latest book is Seasteading: How Floating Nations Will Restore the Environment, Enrich the Poor, Cure the Sick, and Liberate Humanity from Politicians. Quirk is also president of the non-profit Seasteading Institute.

== Work ==
Quirk's novel The Ultimate Rush, published in 1998, concerns a rollerblading messenger caught in an illegal insider trading ring.

Quirk's nonfiction book It's Not You, It's Biology: the Science of Love, Sex & Relationships (originally titled Sperm Are from Men, Eggs Are from Women: The Real Reason Men and Women Are Different, as a retort to John Gray's Men Are from Mars, Women Are from Venus) is a relationships book grounded in science, presenting relationship advice heavily grounded in evolutionary psychology.

Quirk's 2009 novel Exult tells a story of love, death, and hope among a community of hang-gliders.

Quirk has also published a science/history book, Call to the Rescue: The Story of the Marine Mammal Center.

Since March 2014, Quirk has worked at the Seasteading Institute as an author and "seavangelist." At the Seasteading Institute, he authored a book with Patri Friedman on seasteading as a solution to multiple issues facing the globe. In 2019, he directed the documentary The First Seasteaders, about a prototype seastead built and deployed off the coast of Thailand.

== Controversy ==
In 2011, a lawsuit claiming copyright infringement was filed by author Joe Quirk, claiming the movie Premium Rush was based on Quirk's screenplay from The Ultimate Rush. The suit claimed many plot, character name, and scene similarities to Quirk's original screenplay. In July 2012, federal judge Richard Seeborg declined to dismiss Quirk's claim that Sony Pictures, parent company of Columbia Pictures, had breached an implied contract. The production company Pariah, director David Koepp and co-screenwriter John Kamps are also named in the suit.

== Works ==
- Seasteading:How Floating Nations Will Restore the Environment, Enrich the Poor, Cure the Sick, and Liberate Humanity from Politicians. Simon and Schuster. 2017. ISBN 978-1451699265.
- The Ultimate Rush. William Morrow. 1998. ISBN 978-1-901982-38-1.
- It's Not You, It's Biology. Running Press. 2008. ISBN 978-0-7624-3256-1.
- Call to the Rescue: The Story of the Marine Mammal Center. Chronicle Books. 2009. ISBN 978-0-8118-7008-5.
- Exult. Numina Press. 2009. ISBN 978-0-9753615-8-0.
