= The Sower (novel) =

2009 book by Kemble Scott

- First edition cover
- Author: Kemble Scott
- Language: English
- Genre: Literary Fiction
- Publisher: Scribd
- Publication date: May 18, 2009
- Publication place: United States
- Media type: Digital
- Pages: 457

The Sower (2009) is the bestselling second novel by American author Kemble Scott, pen name of Scott James, writer of a weekly column about the San Francisco Bay Area published in both The Bay Citizen and The New York Times.

It was the first novel in publishing history to be sold in digital form by Scribd, the document sharing website. The Sower premiered on May 18, 2009, in conjunction with the launch of the company's book selling division, Scribd Store. The author's decision to break with tradition and offer a first release of a new novel as a digital book received international media attention, including coverage in The New York Times, The Times of London, The Los Angeles Times, and on National Public Radio.

The media coverage led to offers to create a printed version. On August 31, 2009, Numina Press published the first hardcover edition, which instantly hit the San Francisco Chronicle's bestsellers list, premiering at #5 for that week.

The Sower is a darkly comic novel that tells the story of a California oil worker who becomes the sole carrier of a manmade virus that appears to cure all diseases. But the only way this cure is passed to others is through sex. Large forces conspire to prevent this from happening by plotting to control or destroy the virus and its host.

Written as a pastiche of the thriller novel genre, the storyline employs international intrigue that takes the plot around the world to exotic locations, including the San Francisco underground, the catacombs of Paris, a yacht on the Amazon river, the Vatican in Rome, and a bedroom in the U.S. presidential retreat Camp David. Villains in the story include highly fictionalized parodies of controversial evangelical minister Rev. Rick Warren, pop star Madonna, and president George W. Bush.

In October 2010, a second digital edition of was released: The Sower 2.0. Debuting exclusively on Scribd, the new version was reimagined by the author and updated with topical references for late 2010. Considered the first version 2.0 of a novel, the second digital edition was also used reading technology from Apture to allow readers to get information on words and phrases in the novel via pop-up screens. On November 15, 2010, a digital edition of The Sower 2.0 became available for Amazon's Kindle.

== Biblical Reference ==
The Sower derives its title from the Parable of the Sower, a story told by Jesus Christ in The Bible, found in gospels Matthew, Mark, Luke, and Thomas. In the parable, a sower dropped seed on the path, on rocky ground, and among thorns, and the seed was lost; but when seed fell on good earth, it grew, yielding thirty, sixty, and a hundredfold.

== Plot summary ==
Oil worker Bill Soileau is a reckless hedonist based in San Francisco and well acquainted with the city's notorious sexual underground. He long ago contracted HIV but seems unconcerned about exposing his partners.

On assignment at what appears to be an oil refinery abandoned by Soviet occupiers in a remote part of modern-day Armenia, Soileau meet Dr. Quif Melikian. She's conducting a health safety inspection of the plant and has discovered a hidden laboratory.

An accident in the mysterious lab infects Bill with a manmade virus, later identified as a mutated form of phage. It instantly cures Bill's HIV, unbeknownst to anyone. Eventually the doctor and oil worker discover the existence of the phage and learn it's a type of miraculous retrovirus that rewrites diseased cells back to their original configurations, a potential cure for all diseases.

The two also learn the phage cure can only be passed to others via sex. This sets in motion a plot to destroy or control the phage and Bill Soileau.

== Major Themes ==
In an age where victims of AIDS and HIV continue to face moral condemnation, The Sower twists the notion that morality can be assigned to a disease. In the case of the phage virus, the disease becomes a cure and promiscuous unsafe sex has the potential to save millions of lives.

But “love conquers all” is not so easily executed. Dearly held American values are put in peril by the idea of sex as a cure.

The protagonist is an anti hero. He's a member of a suspect sexual underclass, a Southerner with racist tendencies, and an unrepentant cheerleader for the business of big oil companies. This makes him an outcast on some level with most political, social and religious ideals, and yet fate has chosen him to be the possible savior of all mankind.

The issue of genocide emerges throughout the novel. Dr. Melikian is a descendant of the Diaspora that fled the Armenian Holocaust. The Roman Catholic Church's opposition to distributing condoms and safe sex information to people infected with AIDS in Africa is equated to genocide, as are efforts to destroy the phage before it can be used to heal the sick.

“Pariahs become saints, disease becomes a cure, the cursed become the chosen people, and promiscuous sex a moral duty. In the end, a moral leper shows us what is right, humane, and true,” said novelist Joe Quirk, author of The Ultimate Rush and Exult, in his endorsement of The Sower.

“Dark, subversive, and laugh-out-loud funny,” said Raj Patel, author of international bestseller Stuffed and Starved.

== Significant Characters ==
Bill Soileau (Louisiana Acadian, pronounced “swallow”) is an oil worker based in San Francisco. This character first appeared in the novel SoMa.

Quif Melikian is a doctor with the Institut Pasteur. She's an investigator for the European equivalent of the Centers for Disease Control, specializing in tracking outbreaks of illness around the world.

Benoit DuCharme is Dr. Melikian's Pasteur colleague and love interest.

Ike is the executive director of Project Inform, an HIV prevention campaign who develops a relationship with Bill Soileau.

Mark Hazodo is a videogame entrepreneur known for his excessive thrill seeking. This character first appeared in the novel SoMa.

The Reverend Willie Warrant is a popular televangelist who advocates for new laws against gay Americans.

Natara Melikian is the sister of the doctor. She is dying, suffering from end-stage AIDS.

Cardinal Umberto Uccelli is a special envoy at The Vatican for the Roman Catholic Church.

== Name Game ==
Most of the characters names are double entendres referring to sexual acts.
