= Olga Zilberbourg =

Russian-American bilingual writer

Olga Zilberbourg (born 1979) is a Russian-American bilingual writer writing in both English and Russian. She was born in Saint Petersburg, Russia, to a family of Jewish-Russian intellectuals, and subsequently immigrated to the US. She has published three collections of fiction in Russia, some of them translated from the English by the author. Like Water, her debut English-language collection of stories, came out in 2019. In the words of the critic Anna Kasradze, "The thread connecting [the stories in Like Water is each protagonist’s attempt to come to terms with an identity that is always in flux, transitioning between various contexts such as emigration, motherhood, partnership, and employment." The Los Angeles Review of Books said her words remind the reader that the dream of assimilation is first a fantasy and then a triumph before it is — finally — a loss.

She lives in San Francisco and coordinates the San Francisco Writers Workshop. Zilberbourg also contributes essays and cultural commentary to well-known American magazines.
