= Net gun =

Non-lethal weapon used to entangle a target

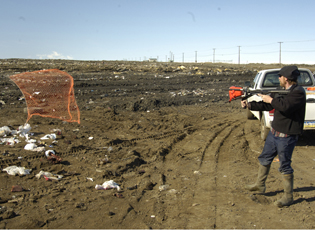
A net gun fired by a USDA researcher to safely capture wild birds to test for Avian Influenza

A net gun is a non-lethal weapon which fires a net that entangles the target. Net guns have a long history of being used to capture wildlife, stray dogs and aircraft. Recent versions can subdue humans and quadcopters, and since the early 2020s, net guns have emerged as a non-explosive counter-drone (counter-UAS) measure adopted by military and security forces.

== History ==
The net gun was invented by New Zealander Colin Brown in 1969 when he tried to sell the police a net gun to capture robbers. His invention took off in the 1970s but was only successful in subduing wildlife and dogs until recently when a net gun designed for law enforcement use was invented.

== Counter-drone applications ==
Since the early 2020s, net guns have attracted renewed interest as a non-explosive counter-drone (counter-UAS) measure, capturing hostile unmanned aerial vehicles by entangling their rotors rather than destroying them. Net launchers such as ParaZero's DefendAir have been demonstrated in field trials and ordered by military and security forces, including for the interception of fast-moving FPV drones.

Handheld, portable models such as the UltraNet developed by the American firm Netgun and marketed through its Netlaunchers defence division are also being supplied to US military units and law enforcement agencies as a counter-drone option, with some variants adapted for drone-mounted launch systems for airborne interception.

Because of the "human safari" terror campaign in the Russo-Ukrainian war, in which Russians target and kill Ukrainian civilians with drones, the defence company BlueBird Tech designed a net gun intended for civilians, which allows them to fire a net at a drone targeting them, entangling the drone. Each launcher can be used only once. The net gun was intentionally classified as a "non-firearm" so that civilians could obtain it without a license.

== See also ==
- Anti-drone gun
