= Trina Thompson =

American judge (born 1961)

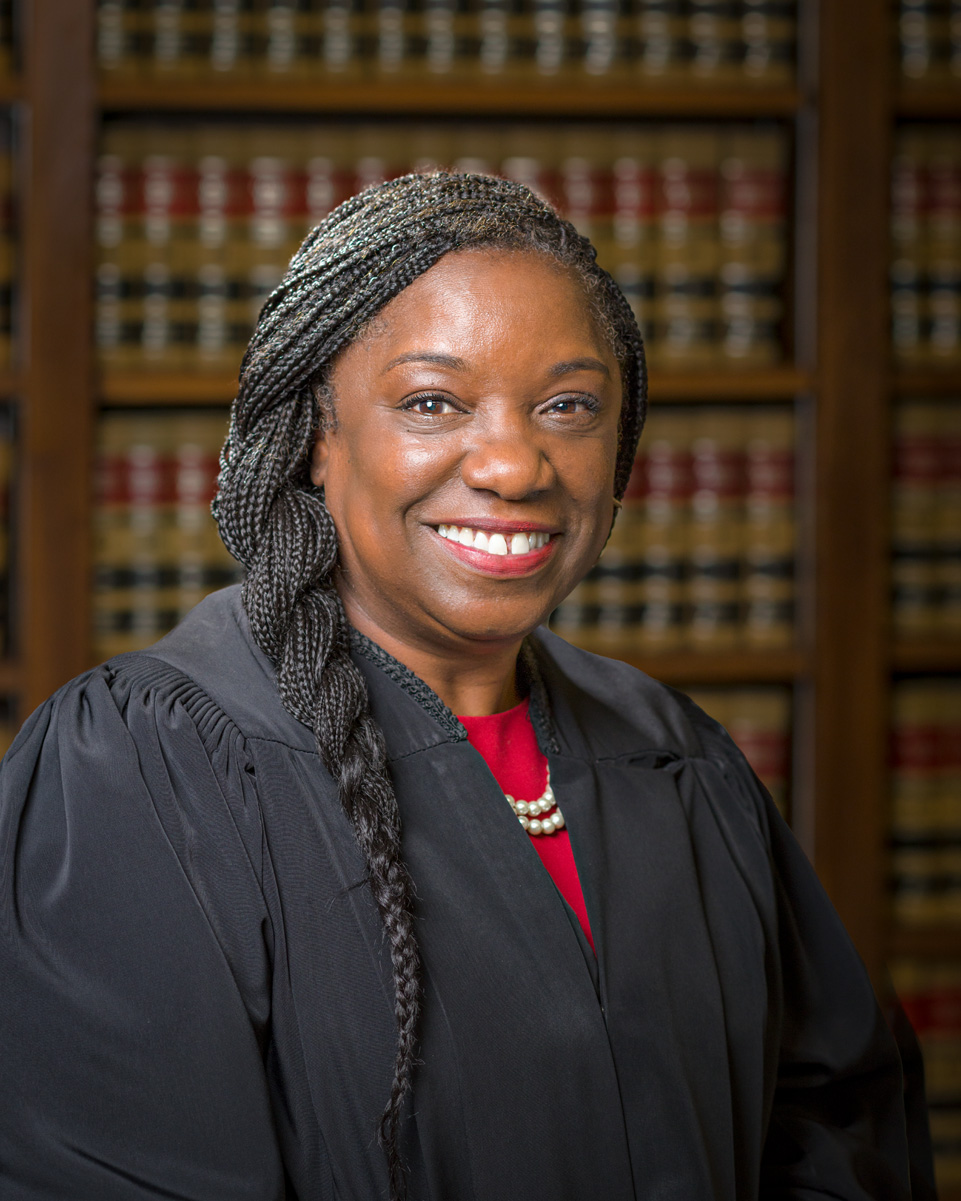

Judge of the United States District Court for the Northern District of California
- Incumbent
- Assumed office August 5, 2022
- Appointed by: Joe Biden
- Preceded by: Phyllis J. Hamilton

Judge of the Alameda County Superior Court
- In office January 2003 – August 5, 2022
- Succeeded by: Maria Morga

Personal details
- Born: 1961 (age 64–65) Oakland, California, U.S.
- Party: Democratic
- Education: University of California, Berkeley (BA, JD)

Trina Lynn Thompson (born 1961) is an American judge who serves as a United States district judge of the United States District Court for the Northern District of California. She previously served as a state court judge of the Alameda County Superior Court.

== Education ==
Thompson received her Bachelor of Arts from the University of California, Berkeley in 1983 and her Juris Doctor from the UC Berkeley School of Law in 1986.

== Career ==
From 1986 to 1991, Thompson served as a law clerk and later as a deputy public defender in the Alameda County Public Defender's Office. From 1991 to 2000, she served as a criminal defense attorney at her own law firm, The Law Offices of Trina Thompson-Stanley, in Oakland. From 2000 to 2002, she was a Juvenile Court Commissioner in Alameda County Superior Court. In 2002, she was elected as a judge on the Alameda County Superior Court in Oakland, California; she was the first African-American woman elected to the court. She was sworn-in in January 2003. In 2011, President Barack Obama appointed Thompson to serve on the Coordinating Council on Juvenile Justice and Delinquency Prevention. From 2014 to 2021, she was a lecturer at the University of California, Berkeley and since 2018 she has been an adjunct professor at the UC Berkeley School of Law.

=== Federal judicial service ===
On November 3, 2021, President Joe Biden nominated Thompson to serve as a United States district judge of the United States District Court for the Northern District of California. President Biden nominated Thompson to the seat vacated by Judge Phyllis J. Hamilton, who assumed senior status on February 1, 2021. On January 3, 2022, her nomination was returned to the President under Rule XXXI, Paragraph 6 of the United States Senate; she was later renominated the same day. On February 16, 2022, a hearing on her nomination was held before the Senate Judiciary Committee. On March 10, 2022, her nomination was reported out of committee by a 12–10 vote. On May 17, 2022, the Senate invoked cloture on her nomination by a 51–46 vote. On May 18, 2022, her nomination was confirmed by a 51–44 vote. She received her judicial commission on August 5, 2022.

=== Notable cases ===
On December 31, 2025, Thompson blocked the Trump administration from removing temporary protected status for immigrants from Honduras, Nepal, & Nicaragua.

== See also ==
- List of African-American federal judges
- List of African-American jurists

Legal offices
Preceded by Phyllis J. Hamilton	Judge of the United States District Court for the Northern District of California; 2022–present	Incumbent
