= Michael Chorost =

American book author, essayist, public speaker (born 1964)

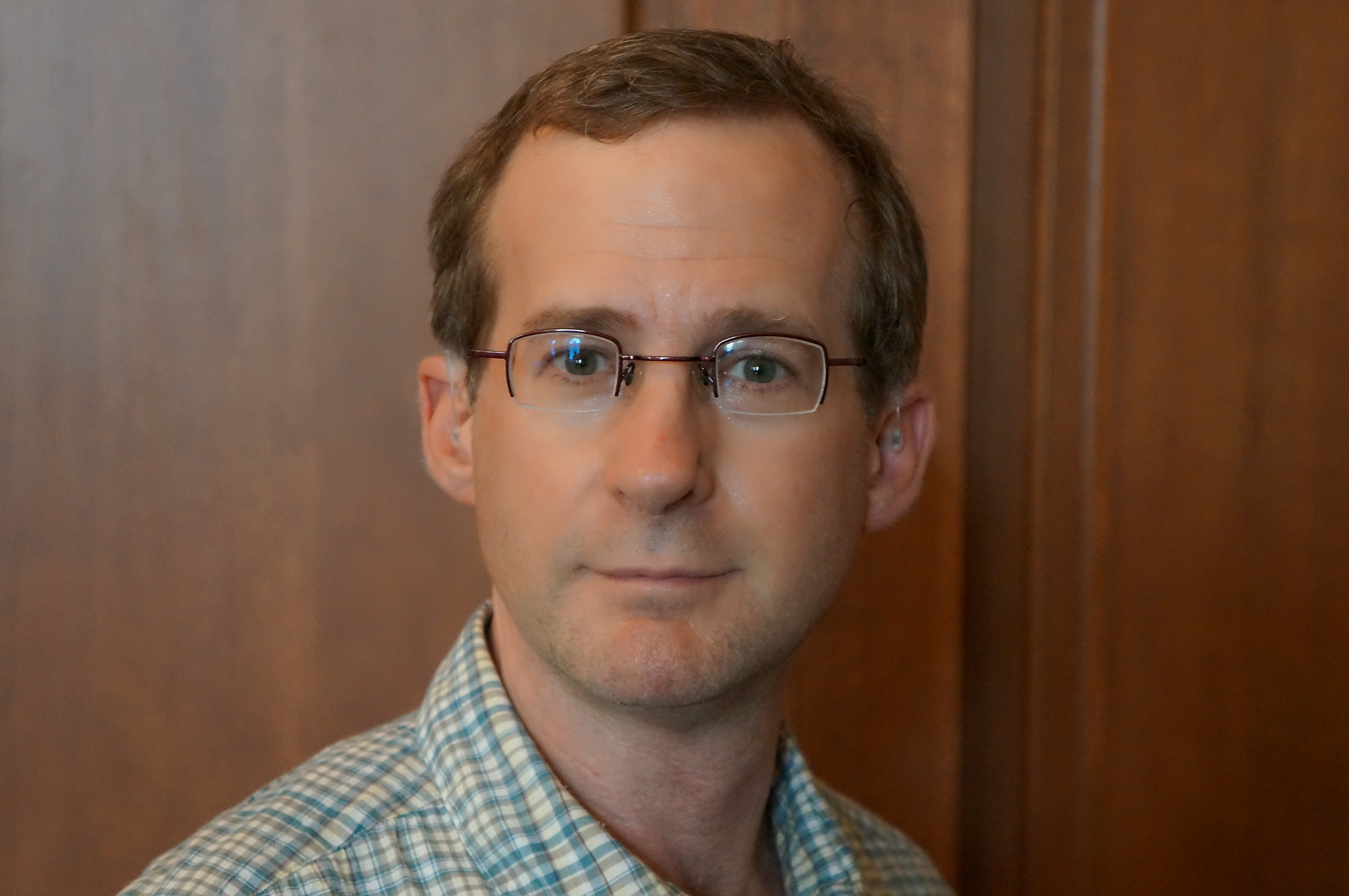
- In June 2014, at the John W. Kluge Center of the Library of Congress
- Born: December 26, 1964 (age 61); Elizabeth, New Jersey
- Occupation: Writer
- Known for: book author, essayist, and public speaker
- Notable work: World Wide Mind: The Coming Integration of Humanity, Machines, and the Internet
- Website: michaelchorost.com

Michael Chorost (born December 26, 1964) is an American book author, essayist, and public speaker. Born with severe loss of hearing due to rubella, his hearing was partially restored with a cochlear implant in 2001 and he had his other ear implanted in 2007.

== Career and published works ==
He wrote a memoir of the experience, titled Rebuilt: How Becoming Part Computer Made Me More Human (Houghton Mifflin, 2005, ISBN 0-61-837829-4). Its paperback version has a different subtitle, Rebuilt: My Journey Back to the Hearing World, ISBN 0-61-871760-9. In August 2006 Rebuilt won the PEN/USA Book Award for Creative Nonfiction.

His second book, World Wide Mind: The Coming Integration of Humanity, Machines, and the Internet, ISBN 1-43-911914-7, was published by Free Press on February 15, 2011.

Dr. Chorost has published in Wired, New Scientist, Astronomy Now, The Futurist, The Scientist, Technology Review, the Chronicle of Higher Education, and SKY. He co-wrote a PBS television show titled The 22nd Century which aired in January 2007. He was a member of the San Francisco Writers Workshop.

Dr. Chorost is frequently interviewed as an authority on cochlear implants and neurally controlled prosthetics by national media such as PBS Newshour, the New York Times and The Economist.

He lectures frequently at universities, conferences, corporations, and organizations for the deaf.

== Education and personal life ==
Born in New Jersey and educated at Brown University (BA in English, 1987), the University of Texas at Austin (PhD in rhetoric and composition, 2000), and University of Wales, Lampeter. He now lives in Washington, DC with his wife and two cats.
