= Erika Mailman =

American novelist

Erika Mailman is an American author and journalist. Mailman was born in the United States, growing up in Vermont and attending both Colby College and the University of Arizona, Tucson. She later began writing a column for the Montclarion edition of the Contra Costa Times. She has lived in Oakland, California for the last 7 years. She has taught at Chabot College in Hayward, California.

Mailman, born in Vermont to a German-American family, is the descendant of a woman who twice stood trial for witchcraft in the Salem witch trials in 1692.

Mailman's debut novel The Witch's Trinity reportedly sold for six-figures. It is set in a medieval German town in 1487 and examines the struggle between Christianity and pagan tradition through the story of a Christian woman on trial for witchcraft.

== Reception ==
Critical reception for Mailman's work has been mostly positive, with The Witch's Trinity gaining praise from Marie Claire and Boston.com. The Isle of Man Today criticized The Witch's Trinity, stating that it "is unsophisticated in its good versus evil premise". The novel was a San Francisco Chronicle Notable Book of 2007, and a Bram Stoker Award finalist.

== Bibliography ==
- Oakland Hills (Images of America series, Arcadia Publishing, 2004)
- Oakland's Neighborhoods (Images of America series, Arcadia Publishing, 2005)
- The Witch's Trinity (Random House, 2007)
- Woman of Ill Fame (Heyday Books, 2007)
