= Ransom Stephens =

American scientist and author

Ransom Stephens is an American scientist and author.

== Professional life ==
As a particle physicist, Ransom Stephens worked on experiments at SLAC, Fermilab (DØ), CERN (ATLAS), and Cornell (CLEO), discovered a new type of matter, and worked on the team that discovered the Top quark. During the tech boom that ended in 2001, he directed patent development for a wireless web startup, and later became an expert on timing noise. His specialty at this time was the analysis of electrodynamics in high-rate digital systems.

His novel, The God Patent, makes use of Stephens's experience as a physicist, patent director, public speaker and single father. The novel includes a character loosely based on the physicist Emmy Noether.

== Works ==
- The God Patent. Numina Press. 2009. ISBN 978-0-9842600-0-3.
- The Sensory Deception. 47North. 2013. ISBN 978-1611099195.
- The Left Brain Speaks, the Right Brain Laughs: A Look at the Neuroscience of Innovation & Creativity in Art, Science & Life. Viva Editions. 2020. ISBN 978-1632280466.
