= Tamim Ansary =

Afghan-American author

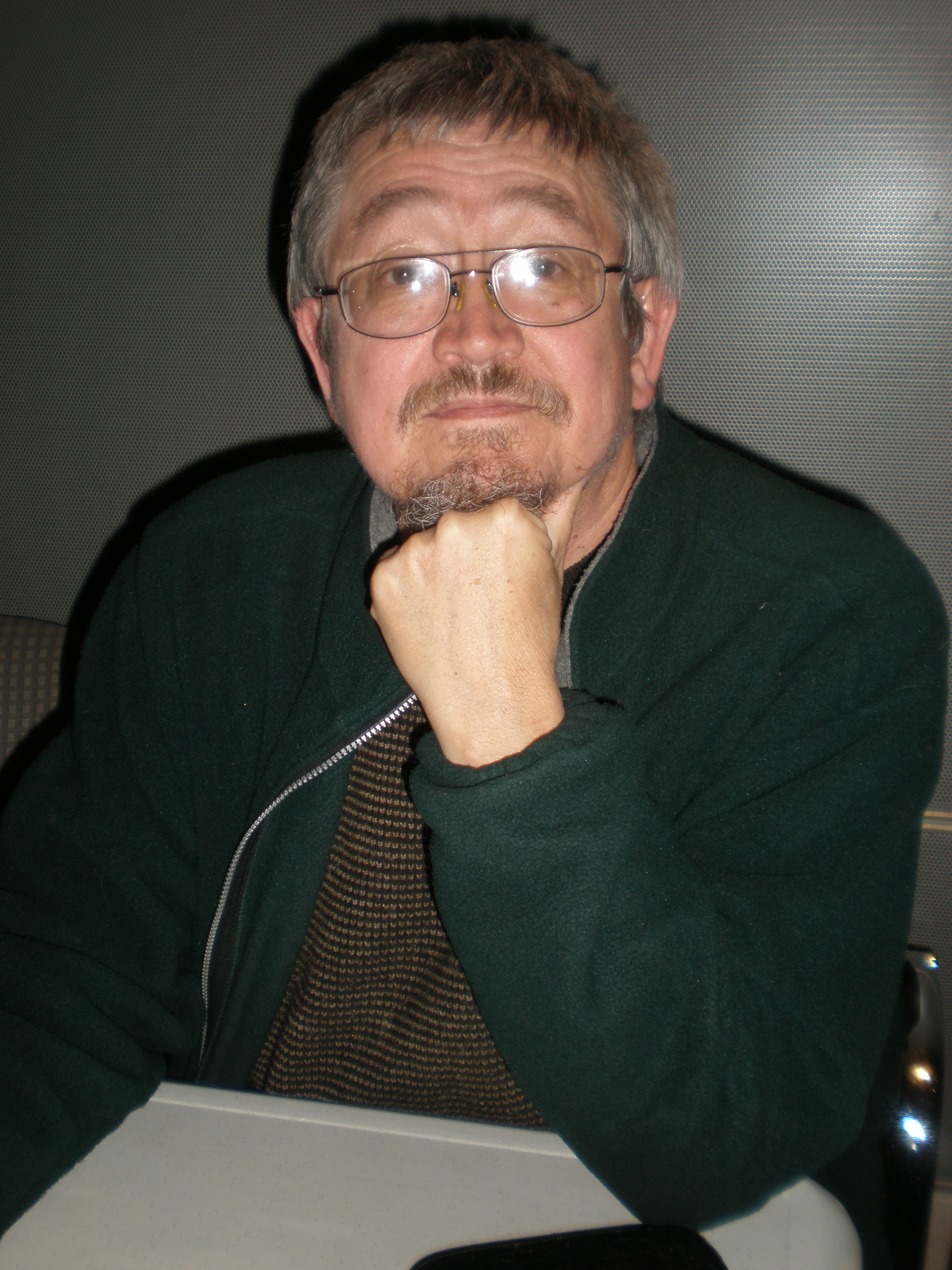
Ansary in October 2008

Mir Tamim Ansary (born November 4, 1948, in Kabul, Afghanistan) is an Afghan-American author and public speaker. He is the author of books concerning Afghan and Muslim history, including Destiny Disrupted: A History of the World Through Islamic Eyes and West of Kabul, East of New York. He was previously a columnist for the encyclopedia website Encarta.

== Early life and education ==
Ansary was born in Kabul and lived there until high school when he moved to the United States. In Afghanistan he attended Lashkargah School, and Lycée Esteqlal. He then attended the Colorado Rocky Mountain School in the United States.

He attended Reed College in Portland, Oregon.

== Writer and lecturer ==
Ansary gained prominence in 2001 after he wrote a widely circulated e-mail that denounced the Taliban and warned that, although he believed the United States would need to be deployed in Afghanistan to capture or kill Osama Bin Laden, in Ansary's opinion, that could start a third world war. The e-mail was a response to a call to bomb Afghanistan "into the Stone Age".

His book West of Kabul, East of New York is a literary memoir recounting his bicultural perspective on contemporary world conflicts. West of Kabul, East of New York was San Francisco's One City One Book selection for 2008. Ansary also edited and published a group of essays by young Afghans entitled, Snapshots: This Afghan American Life with funding from a 2008 grant from the Christianson Fund.

In mid-2008 Ansary gave a series of lectures to the Osher Lifelong Learning Institute, associated with San Francisco State University, on the history and development of Islam. This series was rebroadcast on the local affiliate of National Public Radio [KALW].

Ansary's novel, The Widow's Husband, portrays the nineteenth-century British invasion of Afghanistan from both an Afghan and a British perspective.

Destiny Disrupted: A History of the World Through Islamic Eyes was published in 2009 by PublicAffairs and won the 2010 Northern California book award, general nonfiction category. A review in the San Francisco Chronicle wrote "Ansary does a good job of depicting the fundamental societal and cultural changes that have shaped the history of Islamic civilization." The book was also reviewed in the journal Literature and Theology.

Games Without Rules: The Often Interrupted History of Afghanistan, published in 2012, offers an Afghan-centric perspective of the country’s history, its prevailing culture and societal dynamics, and the impact of interference from major foreign powers.

A memoir, Road Trips, Becoming an American in the vapor trail of The Sixties, recounts stories from Ansary's years as part of the American ‘60s and ‘70s counterculture.

His latest book, The Invention of Yesterday: A 50,000-Year History of Human Culture, Conflict, and Connection, was released in October 2019.

For over two decades, Ansary moderated the San Francisco Writers Workshop.

Ansary lives in San Francisco with his wife. They have two daughters.

== Works ==
- "Could deal with Taliban fighters end war?", Tamim Ansary, CNN, January 30, 2010
- West of Kabul, East of New York. Macmillan. 2003. ISBN 978-0-312-42151-9.
- Snapshots: This Afghan American Life. Kajakai Press. 2008. ISBN 978-0-615-19737-1.
- The Widow's Husband. Numina Press. 2009. ISBN 978-0-9753615-0-4. "the widow's husband."
- Destiny Disrupted: A History of the World Through Islamic Eyes. Basic Civitas Books. 2009. ISBN 978-1-58648-606-8.
- Games Without Rules: the Often Interrupted History of Afghanistan. Public Affairs. 2012. ISBN 978-1610390941.
- Road Trips: Becoming an American in the vapor trail of The Sixties. Kajakai Press. 2016. ISBN 978-0578185262.
- The Invention of Yesterday: A 50,000-Year History of Human Culture, Conflict, and Connection. Public Affairs, 2019.
