= The Ultimate Rush =

1998 novel by Joe Quirk

- First edition cover
- Author: Joe Quirk
- Language: English
- Genre: Thriller
- Publisher: William Morrow and Company
- Publication date: March 18, 1998
- Media type: Print (hardcover)
- Pages: 320pp (first edition)
- ISBN: 0-688-15270-8
- OCLC: 678644300
- Dewey Decimal: 813.54
- LC Class: PS3567.U373 U5

The Ultimate Rush is a 1998 novel by author Joe Quirk about a roller-blading messenger in San Francisco named Chet Griffin who spends his nights hacking for fun. One of his messenger deliveries gets him mixed up in an illegal investment scheme. He discovers the illegal activities and is framed for murder by a corrupt police officer. He is chased through the streets by the police, the Italian and Chinese mafias, and the Federal Computer Investigations Committee. He uses his skills as a hacker to expose the corruption and save his girlfriend.

== Legal issues ==
In 2011, a lawsuit was filed against Sony Pictures by author Joe Quirk, asserting that the 2012 feature film Premium Rush was in fact based on Quirk's screenplay from his 1998 novel The Ultimate Rush. The suit laid out many plot, character name, and scene similarities to Quirk's original screenplay. On April 2, 2013, U.S. District Judge Richard Seeborg dismissed this case, finding that the two works were not substantially similar.
