= Zarina Zabrisky =

American writer

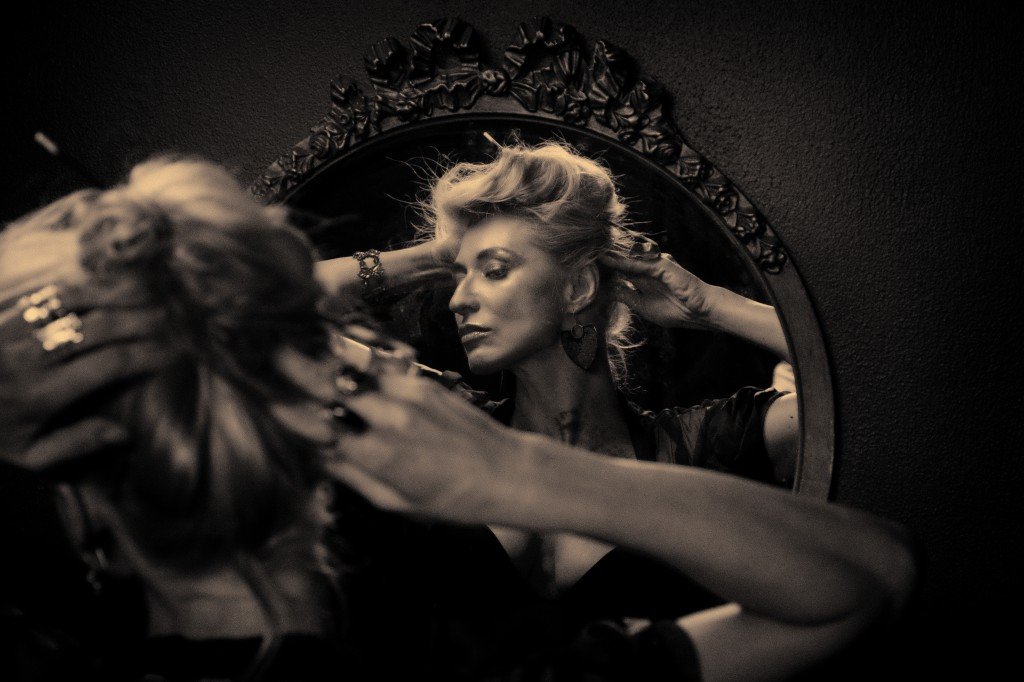
- Zabrisky in February 2014
- Born: Leningrad, USSR
- Occupations: Writer and reporter

Zarina Zabrisky is an American writer and reporter based in Ukraine. She is the author of the novel, We, Monsters, several collections of short stories, including Explosion, A Cute Tombstone and her debut work, Iron, and a book of collaborative poetry and art, Green Lions, co-written with Simon Rogghe.

She is a correspondent for Byline Times and Euromaidan Press. She has contributed to BBC News, Voice of America, TVP World, The Atlantic, and more.

Zabrisky also co-produced the award-winning documentary Under the Deadly Skies and directed and produced the documentary Kherson: Human Safari.

Her work in exposing Putin’s crimes in Ukraine led Zabrisky to be sanctioned by the Russian foreign Ministry in August 2025, which added her to its "stop list", banning from ever entering the country.

The 6th of June 2026, on Ukraine's Journalist Day, the President Volodymyr Zelenskyy awarded Zabrisky the Order of Merit III Class for her work as a war correspondent and her film "Kherson: Human Safari", which depicts the daily Russian terror against civilians".

== Career ==
Since she began to publish her work in 2011, Zabrisky has been a three-time nominee for the Pushcart Prize (nominated by Eleven Eleven Journal of Literature of Art, Red Fez Literary Magazine and Epic Rites Press) and was a finalist for the Normal School's Normal Prize in Fiction, 2012. Zabrisky also received an editor nomination for the Million Writers Award, an honourable mention for the New Millennium Writings 2012, and was awarded the Acker Award for Achievement in The Avant Garde, 2013. Zabrisky has been published in over 40 literary magazines and anthologies in the UK, US, Canada, Hong Kong and Nepal.

Zabrisky is also known for her spoken word performances. She has staged a rock jazz ballet pop musical-thriller We, Monsters (based on her novel We, Monsters), starring local writers and poets, at Viracocha and Pegasus Books, California. Zabrisky has appeared at Litquake Festivals in 2012 and 2013. She has also performed and judged literary merit at the Literary Death Match, held at The Contemporary Jewish Museum and in Los Angeles. Zabrisky's stories Honey-Hued Eyes and Wanderlust were performed by the Liars' League, the former in support of the Gay and Straight Alliance in Hong Kong, 2013. She has performed at the San Francisco State Poetry reading, Man Ray/Lee Miller-Partners in Surrealism at the Legion of Honour Museum, San Francisco.

Zabrisky has been involved in campaigns concerning the human rights, including Pussy Riot movement, and organised a protest outside the Russian Consulate in 2013. During interviews after the event, she stated, "The Pussy Riot trial is an insult to me as a writer, a woman, and a human being. I have been apolitical all my life. Most Russians know that protest in Russia is absurd, ... there is a line, though, where one is so outraged that feelings grow into actions and words, and sometimes actions and words out of the ordinary". She is a co-founder of The Arts Resistance, a movement or artists and writers gathered to resist the injustice and war in the world and support human rights by means of the arts.

Since 2016 Zabrisky has been actively involved in investigative journalism and has been quoted in several books and articles, including Craig Unger's 2018 bestseller, House of Trump, House of Putin, Russian-American historian Yuri Felshtinsky's article on Dimitry Simis, the Antidot, the Voice of Binkongoh and Radio Svoboda.

Along with human rights lawyer Olga Tomchin, Zabrisky has co-produced various seminars on propaganda. In 2018, Zabrisky presented at the Byline Festival in the UK on alleged connections between President Donald Trump and Russia, hybrid war, the "mafia state" and global alt-right movements.

== Journalism ==
Zabrisky is currently based in Kherson, Ukraine. From the beginning of the 2022 full-scale Russian invasion of Ukraine, Zabrisky has been published in The Paris Review and various other publications. She has been reporting on the war in Ukraine for Euromaidan Press, Byline Times and Community Alliance.

Zabrisky co-produced and was in the cast of the documentary Under Deadly Skies: Ukraine's Eastern Front (Byline TV), 2023.

Zabrisky published the first story about the human safari in Kherson the 29th of July 2024 and reported several times about it for Euromaidan Press in August 2024, when she was the first to write the term human safari.

She was interviewed by TVP World in August and October 2024, as well as in January 2025 about the situation in Kherson.

Zabrisky wrote other reports from Kherson for The Kyiv Independent, the Kyiv Post and Euromaidan Press and published many victims interviews on her X account .

Zabrisky directed and produced Kherson: Human Safari in 2025, a documentary about Kherson which "tells the story of a city torn—but undefeated—by Russian invasion, occupation, flood, and now, a new war crime: drones hunting civilians in what locals call a “human safari.”"

== Personal life ==
Born in Leningrad, Zabrisky is of Jewish origin and has stated that she moved to the United States at an age "young enough to forget when it was, and old enough to keep my accent". She has previously held jobs as a kickboxing instructor, oilfield translator, travel co-ordinator and business liaison in Kazakhstan, street artist and masseuse.

Zabrisky received a degree in English language and Literature at the Philological Faculty at St. Petersburg State University. This course allegedly contained training in propaganda and brainwashing techniques.

== Filmography ==
- Under Deadly Skies: Ukraine's Eastern Front (Byline TV), co-producer and actor, 2023
- Kherson: Human Safari, Director and producer, 2025

== Bibliography ==
- We, Monsters (Numina Press), 2014
- A Cute Tombstone (Epic Rites Press), 2013
- Iron (Epic Rites Press), 2012
- Green Lions (Numina Press), 2014
- Explosion (Epic Rites Press), 2015
