= Looking Forward (anthology) =

1953 anthology of science fiction stories edited by Milton Lesser

- First edition cover
- Editor: Milton Lesser
- Language: English
- Genre: Science fiction short stories
- Publisher: Beechhurst Publishing
- Publication date: 1953
- Publication place: United States
- Media type: Print (Hardback)
- Pages: 400 pp

Looking Forward is an anthology of science fiction stories edited by Milton Lesser, published in hardcover in 1953 by Beechhurst Press and reprinted in the British market in 1955 by Cassell & Company. The anthology was particularly poorly received, and carried the unusually high cover price, for its day, of $5.00. Its contents include one of the few uncollected and otherwise unanthologized stories by Walter M. Miller, Jr.

== Contents ==
- "Science Fiction Comes of Age", Milton Lesser
- "The Man from Outside", Jack Williamson (Astounding 1951)
- "We Kill People", Lewis Padgett (Astounding 1946)
- "Win the World", Chad Oliver (Startling Stories 1952)
- "The Little Creeps", Walter M. Miller, Jr. (Amazing 1951)
- "Highway", Robert A. W. Lowndes Science Fiction Quarterly 1942
- "Exile", Edmond Hamilton (Super Science Stories 1943)
- "The Power" Murray Leinster (Astounding 1945)
- "The Man in the Moon", Mack Reynolds (Amazing 1950)
- "Production Test", Raymond F. Jones (Astounding 1949)
- "Lion's Mouth", Milton Lesser (Fantastic Adventures 1952)
- "In This Sign", Ray Bradbury (Imagination 1951)
- "Victory Unintentional", Isaac Asimov (Super Science Stories 1942)
- "The Voyage That Lasted 600 Years", Don Wilcox (Amazing 1940)
- "The Last Monster", Poul Anderson (Super Science Stories 1951)
- "The King of Thieves", Jack Vance (Startling Stories 1949)
- "Man of Destiny", John Christopher (Galaxy 1951)
- "Lulungomeena", Gordon R. Dickson (Galaxy 1954)
- "Ultima Thule", Eric Frank Russell (Astounding 1951)
- "Into Thy Hands", Lester del Rey (Astounding 1945)
- "Transcience", Arthur C. Clarke (Startling Stories 1949)

"We Kill People" carried the "Lewis Padgett" byline. "Win the World" was originally published as "The Subversives". "Highway" originally carried the byline "Wilfred Owen Morley". "Lion's Mouth" was originally published under the "Stephen Marlowe" byline. "The Last Monster" was originally published as "Terminal Quest."

== Reception ==
New York Times critic J. Francis McComas described the volume as "exorbitantly priced," found Lesser's introduction "irritating" and "meaningless," noted that the stories were either already available ("in better books") or among their authors' "feebler works," and concluded that Looking Forward was a book "whose over-all merit is dubious indeed." Hartford Courant reviewer R. W. Wallace declared that most of the stories "run to boiled beef rather than grilled tenderloin. . . . not what you'd pick if you wanted to tempt the appetite of a guest." P. Schuyler Miller more charitably noted the volume's price and declared it was "not bad."
