= Kemble Scott =

American novelist

- In San Francisco's South of Market 2007
- Born: 1962 (age 63–64)
- Occupations: Novelist, journalist
- Writing career
- Pen name: Kemble Scott
- Notable works: SoMa (2007), The Sower (2009)
- Notable awards: 2008 Lambda Literary Award Finalist for Debut Fiction; 1993 - 1995 Three Emmy awards for television news.
- Website: www.scottjameswriter.com

Kemble Scott is the pseudonym for fiction used by American journalist Scott James (born 1962), writer of a weekly column about the San Francisco Bay Area for The New York Times and The Bay Citizen. His debut novel SoMa became a bestseller (San Francisco Chronicle) in the spring of 2007. The novel tells the interwoven stories of twentysomethings on the prowl for thrills in San Francisco’s South of Market (SoMa) neighborhood following the city’s infamous Dot-com crash. In June 2008 the novel SoMa was honored as a finalist for the national Lambda Literary award for debut fiction.

At the time SoMa was published, James produced a series of videos for YouTube in which he appeared as Kemble Scott to take viewers to the real places that inspired the novel. It’s believed this was the first time an author launched a novel this way. The videos received thousands of views and may have contributed to the book’s bestseller status. The influential tech blog Valleywag noted the videos, but criticized them for being too tame, compared to the sexually explicit content of the novel.

In May 2009 James published his second novel, The Sower by Kemble Scott. The first edition premiered as a digital book and was the first novel sold by social publisher Scribd.com in a new e-commerce venture called "Scribd Store," according to the Associated Press.

The author's decision to release the first edition of The Sower exclusively as an e-book received widespread media coverage. This led to offers to create a printed version. On August 31, 2009, Numina Press published the first hardcover edition, which instantly hit the San Francisco Chronicle's bestsellers list, premiering at #5 for that week.

In October 2010, a second digital edition of was released: The Sower 2.0. Debuting exclusively on Scribd, the new version was reimagined by the author and updated with topical references for late 2010.

Prior to working in fiction, James was a longtime television news writer, producer and executive. While at WLNE-TV in Providence, Rhode Island, he was honored with three Emmy awards. During his tenure there as news director, the station twice won the News Station of the Year Award from the Associated Press.

James has an MS from the Columbia University Graduate School of Journalism, and a BA from Adelphi University. He resides in San Francisco and is co-founder of The Castro Writers' Cooperative, known as The Coop, a co-working space for Bay Area writers.
