= The Other Side of the Sky: A Memoir =

2005 memoir by Farah Ahmedi with Tamim Ansary

- Author: Farah Ahmedi
- Language: English
- Publisher: Simon Spotlight Entertainment
- Publication date: 2005
- Publication place: United States
- Media type: Print (Paperback)
- Pages: 249
- ISBN: 978-1-4169-1837-0
- OCLC: 59552207
- Dewey Decimal: 305.23086/914 B 22
- LC Class: HV640.4.U54 A3 2008

The Other Side of the Sky: A Memoir (originally published as The Story of my Life: An Afghan Girl on the Other Side of the Sky) is a memoir by Farah Ahmedi with Tamim Ansary. The book profiles the life of Farah Ahmedi from the time she was born until she was seventeen years old.

This book is about the struggles Farah faces throughout her life. The story begins when she was growing up in war torn Afghanistan. One day when she was seven, Farah woke up late, so she decided to take a shortcut to school. Unknown to her, there was a landmine that was planted in the field she was cutting across. She accidentally stepped on it and it exploded. After her leg was amputated and she fled to Pakistan with her mother, World Relief accepted their applications to go to America. Once they arrived, Farah and her mother continued to struggle with the new culture, language, and the speed of the modern world.

== Overview ==
The Other Side of the Sky: A Memoir is about Ahmedi's struggles living in Afghanistan as a young girl and her perilous journey to the United States. It is based on a true story.

== Background ==
The war in Afghanistan and Pakistan first began around December 1979. The Soviet army invaded Afghanistan in an attempt to spread communism. In 1980, Babrak Karmal was given the role of the country's leader and he was supported by the Soviets. In retaliation to the Soviet invasion, the Mujahideen fought back, and were supported by the US, Pakistan, China, Iran and Saudi Arabia. By 1985, half of Afghanistan was estimated to be displaced or to have fled to Iran or Pakistan to avoid the war. Fighting continued until 1988 when Afghanistan, the Soviet Union, the US, and Pakistan sign peace agreements and the Soviet Union began pulling out their troops. The last of the Soviet troops left by 1989, but a civil war continued as the Mujahideen tried to overthrow Najibullah who replaced Karmal in 1986.

In 1996, the Taliban took over Kabul and began enforcing their strict Islamic views which meant banning women from work and introducing Islamic punishments, stoning and amputations. The Taliban controlled two thirds of the country and were recognized as legitimate rulers by Pakistan and Saudi Arabia in 1997. The Taliban were accused of bombing US embassies in Africa, and the United States launched missile strikes at Osama bin Laden's bases. In September 2001, Ahmad Shah Masood was assassinated. He was the leader of Northern Alliance: the main opposition towards the Taliban. On September 11, 2001, Al Queda attacked the United States. The US led bombings in Afghanistan shortly afterwards, and Anti-Taliban Northern Alliance forces entered Kabul.

The landmine that Farah stepped on as a young girl in Afghanistan was most likely placed by the Mujahideen, the Taliban, or the forces fighting against them.

== Summary ==
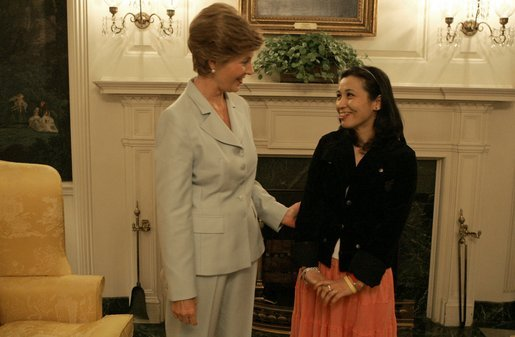
Laura Bush meets with Farah Ahmedi in the Diplomatic Reception Room at the White House on May 5, 2005.

Farah Ahmedi was born in Kabul, Afghanistan near the end of the Soviet–Afghan War. When she was in second grade, she stepped on a land mine while walking to school. Farah was transferred to Germany where her leg was amputated. After over eighteen months in Germany, she returned to her home in Kabul. Shortly after she returned home, her father and two sisters were killed by a stray rocket while Farah and her mother were shopping for fabrics, and her two brothers left Afghanistan in order to avoid a draft. Fearing for their lives, Farah and her mother fled to Pakistan where they endured harsh conditions in refugee camps for a couple years before World Relief rescued them and provided them a home in Chicago, Illinois. In Chicago, Farah and her mother began to adjust to their new life, with major help from Alyce Litz, one of Farah's new friends.

== Style ==
The events of Farah's life are told chronologically in the book. It begins with explaining her life as an Afghan child, and continues with telling the story of her experiences in Germany and America.

== See also ==
- Johnny Got His Gun
- Landmine
- Mujahideen
- September 11 Attacks
- Taliban
