= SoMa (novel) =

2007 novel by Kemble Scott

- First edition cover
- Author: Kemble Scott
- Language: English
- Genre: Adult Literary Fiction
- Publisher: Kensington Books
- Publication date: February 1, 2007
- Publication place: United States
- Media type: Print (Paperback & Hardback)
- Pages: 320 pp (first edition, paperback)
- ISBN: 978-0-7582-1549-9 (first edition, paperback)
- OCLC: 74967576
- Dewey Decimal: 813.6 22
- LC Class: PS3619.C673 S66 2007

SoMa is the bestselling debut novel of American author Kemble Scott, first published February 1, 2007 by Kensington Books as a trade paperback original. It was later published in hardcover by the Doubleday Book Club’s InSightOut Books division.

The novel appeared on the top 10 bestsellers list of The San Francisco Chronicle shortly after it was released, and eventually reached number four on that same list. In the June 2007 catalog of Doubleday’s InSightOut Books SoMa was listed as the #1 bestseller. In June 2008 the novel was honored as a finalist for the national Lambda Literary award for debut fiction.

SoMa is a social satire novel that tells the interwoven stories of men and women in their 20s in search of fun in San Francisco’s South of Market (SoMa) neighborhood. The story takes place in the years following the 2001 dot-com bust, an economic collapse that hit the tech hub of San Francisco particularly hard and left the city with a swell of unemployed or underemployed young adults.

Although fiction, the novel features real San Francisco locations and is inspired by true tales. As a result, the book is a fairly graphic and unflinching portrayal of sexuality in all its forms. Publishers Weekly called SoMa "A fun, frisky novel of shock horror," and said that author Kemble Scott "has his ear to the underground of the sexual revolution."

== Plot summary ==
Raphe is a casualty of the dot-com collapse, a former website designer now forced to work as a clerk at a mailbox shop in order to make ends meet. He discovers the shop is actually a front for a scam. His exposure to this seedy underground sparks his curiosity and eventually leads him on a journey into some of the more bizarre subcultures of San Francisco.

Lauren (called “Lolly”) is a woman who is drawn to the city to find the type of man she can’t find in the suburbs. She discovers the hunt for love is far more complicated than she expected.

Mark Hazodo is a video-game entrepreneur whose love of games extends into a secret sex life.

The journeys of these three main characters intersect, overlap and eventually collide with outrageous, provocative, and sometimes disturbing consequences.

== Major themes ==
SoMa explores the continuum of sexual orientation. The author makes the argument that in an open society, where people are allowed to pursue their desires without restrictions or shame, simplistic black and white views of sexuality are replaced by orientations that exist as complex shades of gray.

The novel also depicts the consequences of living in the new millennium, an age when the latest generations have been bombarded since birth with constant sensory stimulation. Behaviors are pushed to new extremes in order to experience a tangible level of joy, pain, love or pleasure. The novel explores the sexualization of previously ordinary moments, in order to turn them into opportunities for gratification. These include room rental classified ads, public transportation, medical/health procedures and grooming. Even sex and drug use are played out in unusual, dangerous ways.

The author has said the novel also represents a spiritual and philosophical treatise. In an interview with the literary review Small Spiral Notebook, Scott said, "Each of the main characters in SoMa follows a particular life philosophy to deal with their freedoms. As a literary concept, I modeled these philosophies very loosely on the tenets of the world’s three major religions. Do these older belief constructs fit these times? Do they help or hurt the characters? I’m not sure the old rules really work anymore. We need new ones, and we’re still figuring it out."
