= Richard Seeborg =

American federal judge (born 1956)

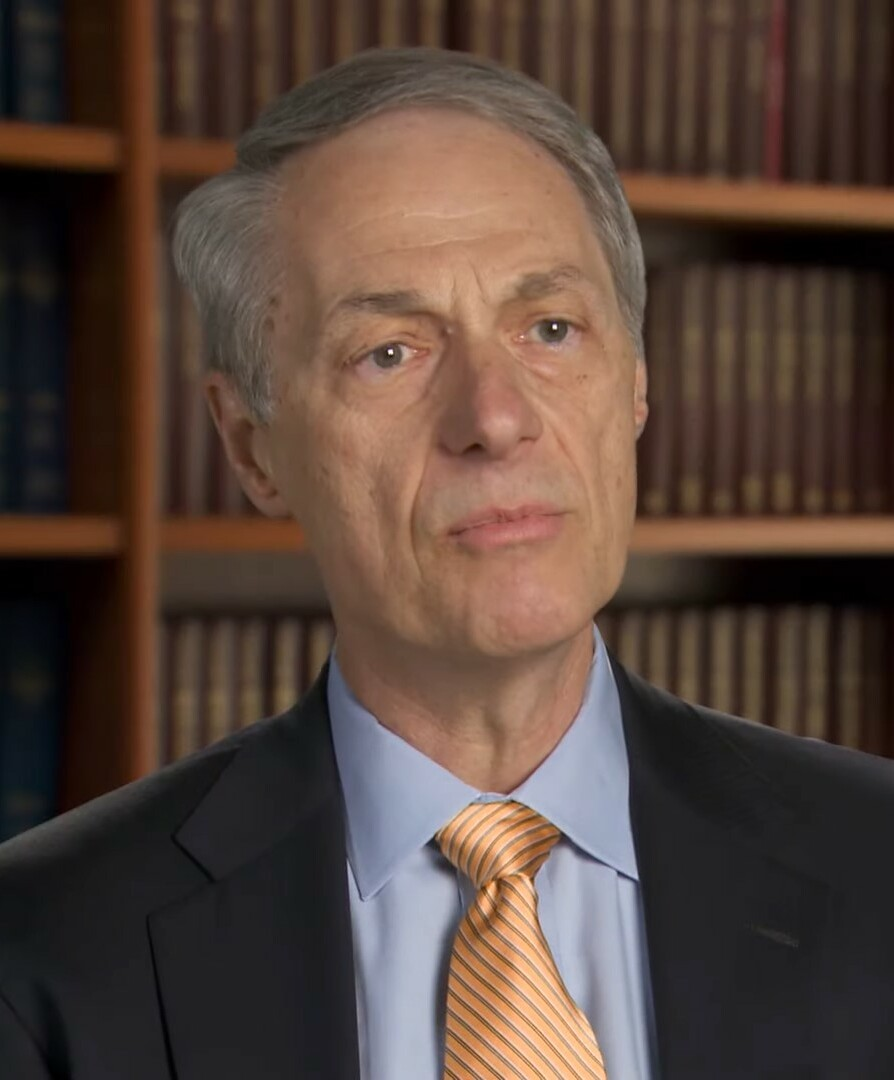
- Seeborg in 2019

Chief Judge of the United States District Court for the Northern District of California
- In office February 1, 2021 – July 1, 2026
- Preceded by: Phyllis J. Hamilton
- Succeeded by: Yvonne Gonzalez Rogers

Judge of the United States District Court for the Northern District of California
- Incumbent
- Assumed office January 4, 2010
- Appointed by: Barack Obama
- Preceded by: Maxine M. Chesney

Personal details
- Born: Richard Gus Seeborg; November 4, 1956 (age 69) Landstuhl, West Germany (now Germany)
- Education: Yale University (BA); Columbia University (JD)

Richard Gus Seeborg (born November 4, 1956) is an American lawyer and jurist serving as a U.S. district judge of the United States District Court for the Northern District of California. He was appointed in 2010 by President Barack Obama, and he served as chief judge of the court from 2021 to 2026. Seeborg was a United States magistrate judge in the same district prior to his appointment.

== Early life and education ==
Seeborg was born in 1956 in Landstuhl town, Kaiserslautern district, Rhineland-Palatinate state, Germany.

Seeborg received a Bachelor of Arts summa cum laude with a major in history from Yale University in May 1978 and a Juris Doctor from Columbia Law School in 1981.

From 1981 to 1982, Seeborg served as a law clerk to Judge John H. Pratt of the United States District Court for the District of Columbia.

== Career ==
In 1982, Seeborg joined the San Francisco law firm of Morrison & Foerster as an associate. He became a partner with the firm in 1987. In 1991, Seeborg left Morrison & Foerster to become an assistant United States attorney for the Northern District of California in San Jose, California. He served in that post until 1998, when he returned to Morrison & Foerster, working as a partner and focusing on a litigation practice in the fields of securities, intellectual property, and general commercial matters.

=== Federal judicial service ===
On February 9, 2001, Seeborg became a United States magistrate judge for the United States District Court for the Northern District of California.

On August 7, 2009, President Barack Obama nominated Seeborg to be a United States district judge on the United States District Court for the Northern District of California. On October 15, 2009, the United States Senate Committee on the Judiciary voted to send Seeborg's nomination to the full Senate. The Senate confirmed Seeborg by unanimous consent on December 24, 2009. He received his commission on January 4, 2010. He became chief judge on February 1, 2021, after Phyllis J. Hamilton assumed senior status.

=== Notable rulings ===
- On March 6, 2019, Seeborg ruled that United States Commerce Secretary Wilbur Ross could not add a question about citizenship to the 2020 United States Census.
- On April 8, 2019, Seeborg ruled that non-Mexican asylum seekers did not have to stay in Mexico while awaiting their court proceedings.

== Personal ==
Seeborg resides in San Francisco, California.

Legal offices
Preceded by Maxine M. Chesney	Judge of the United States District Court for the Northern District of California; 2010–present	Incumbent
Preceded by Phyllis J. Hamilton	Chief Judge of the United States District Court for the Northern District of California; 2021–2026	Succeeded by Yvonne Gonzalez Rogers
