= Radwaniyah Palace =

Residence of the president of Iraq

- Interactive map of the Radwaniyah Palace area

General information
- Location: Baghdad, Iraq
- Coordinates: 33°13′7″N 44°13′1″E
- Owner: Government of Iraq

Technical details
- Size: 18 km²

Radwaniyah Palace (also known as Al Radwaniyah Presidential Complex) is a palace in Baghdad, Iraq, which is the official residence of the president of Iraq and also functioned as a presidential resort for the late Iraqi president Saddam Hussein until it was taken over by Coalition forces during the 2003 US-led invasion of Iraq. The complex spans 18 square kilometres.

Inside, it was decorated with marble, luxury furniture and monuments dedicated to Saddam. Located 20 kilometers from central Baghdad, near the Baghdad International Airport in the west of the city, Radwaniyah Palace was the main presidential site for Saddam and was a typical Presidential site. It is bordered on the north by Qasr Tall Mihl and Al Urdun (Jordan) Street; on the south by sparse, outlying neighborhoods and on the east by suburbs Al 'Amiriyah and Hayy al-Furat. High walls surround the former resort; watchtowers contribute to more readily maintaining surveillance and security for the site. It also included a detention facility which according to Human Rights Watch was able to accommodate up to five-thousand inmates.

In addition to having two man-made hills and several man-made lakes, it houses two presidential palaces. The northern one usually goes by the more familiar name, Al Faw Palace. The southern one is known as the Victory over Iran Palace.

Coalition installations, including Camp Liberty, Camp Victory and Camp Slayer, were used to occupy Al Radwaniyah's grounds.
