= American University of Iraq - Baghdad =

Private university in Baghdad, Iraq

- الجامعة الأمريكية في بغداد
- Other name: AUIB
- Type: Private, Not-for-profit
- Established: 2018
- Founders: Saadi Waheeb Saihood and Family
- Chair: Michael W. Mulnix
- President: Bradley J. Cook
- Students: 2700
- Location: Airport Road, Baghdad, Iraq, Baghdad, Baghdad Governorate, Iraq; 33.284°N 44.256°E
- Campus: Urban, 643 acres (2.60 km^{2})
- Language: English
- Colors
- Website: auib.edu.iq

- Location within Baghdad Location within Iraq

The American University of Iraq – Baghdad (AUIB) is a private, not-for-profit university located in Baghdad, Iraq. Established in 2021, the university is situated within the Al-Faw Presidential Palace, a former presidential site that has been transformed into a university campus. AUIB offers liberal arts-based education modeled on American higher education standards, with English as the language of instruction. The university provides both undergraduate and graduate programs. AUIB's mission is to play a role in the rebuilding of the country's civil society and the economy.

== History ==
In 2017, Douglas Silliman, then U.S. Ambassador to Iraq, signed an agreement to open the American University of Iraq – Baghdad at the Al-Faw Presidential Palace. The palace was built by former President of Iraq Saddam Hussein in the 1990s. After the U.S. invasion of Iraq in 2003, it was occupied by American and coalition forces and incorporated into Camp Victory. The site required extensive renovation to convert into classrooms and lecture halls, costing over $420 million.

Admission of the first class opened in December 2020. In February 2021, then-Iraqi Prime Minister Mustafa Al-Kadhimi and –U.S. Ambassador Matthew Tueller attended the AUIB opening ceremony. The school began offering courses in the colleges of Arts & Sciences, Business, and International Studies, with around 2700 students enrolled.

AUIB has secured several grants, awarded by the U.S. State Department.

== Campus ==
The university's campus is located in what was previously Saddam Hussein’s Al Faw Palace, built in the 1990s. It is located near Baghdad International Airport and is 5 kilometers (3.1 mi) from Baghdad's Green Zone. The university established a 50-year lease on the 622-acre (252 ha) site of the palace, including the palace itself as well as several adjoining residences and four artificial lakes fed by the Tigris River. The buildings are decorated, with marble floors and coffered ceilings, and they are designed to accommodate up to 60,000 students.

Access to the campus is restricted for security reasons; students, and visitors must pass a security checkpoint at the front gate. Once inside, because of the site's size, the campus relies on electric buses for internal transportation. The center of campus includes restaurants.

There are future development plans including student residences. A health cluster, including a medical college and teaching hospital are anticipated to be completed in 2028-2030. The architectural plans for the medical complex won a Wild Design Award in 2024.

== Administration ==
AUIB operates under a leadership structure supported by both private and public sectors. The university is primarily funded through a combination of government and private contributions, with tuition fees accounting for approximately 20% of its operating costs. The average annual tuition is around $6,000, although many students receive full or partial scholarships based on academic achievement and financial need.

AUIB's chief financial supporter is Mr. Saadi Waheeb Saihood, an Iraqi businessman. He is the Chairman and CEO of the Raban Al-Safina Group (RAS Group), a diversified conglomerate involved in energy, construction, oil and gas, technology, and real estate. Mr. Saihood also founded the Mr. Saadi Waheeb Saihood Scholarship to support academically talented Iraqi students from financially challenged backgrounds.

AUIB's founding president, Dr. Michael Mulnix, previously served as the founding president of the American University of Kurdistan. In the second half of 2025, Dr. Mulnix has been be succeeded by Dr. Bradley Cook, former president of the American University of Bahrain.

== Academic profile ==
AUIB adopted an American-style liberal arts education model. Unlike the traditional structure of most Iraqi universities, where students enter directly into a specialized academic major, AUIB students begin their studies with a two-year liberal arts core curriculum. All courses at AUIB are taught in English. To support students transitioning into English-medium higher education, many students in the university’s inaugural classes enrolled in an English Language Academy prior to entering their degree programs.

AUIB is licensed by the Iraqi Ministry of Higher Education and Scientific Research (MOHESR), and the national accreditation process is underway. The university has also sought U.S. institutional accreditation through the Western Association of Schools and Colleges (WASC). AUIB’s College of Pharmacy has already achieved international pre-accreditation status from the Accreditation Council for Pharmacy Education (ACPE).

While the majority of academic offerings are at the undergraduate level, AUIB currently offers a Master of Business Administration (MBA) through a partnership with Lawrence Technological University (LTU). The university also plans to expand its graduate offerings, including programs in the health sciences such as medicine and advanced pharmacy studies. three new master’s degree programs are under active review by the Iraqi Ministry of Higher Education and are in the final stages of approval.

The University is structured into nine colleges:

- Arts & Sciences, comprising English literature, psychology, biology, chemistry, computer science, and physics
- College of Business offers the Bachelor of Business Administration with tracks in management, accounting, marketing, entrepreneurship, management information systems, and finance and banking
- Dentistry with a Bachelor of Dental Surgery program
- Education and Human Development, which offers a Bachelor of Arts in Teaching and Learning Design
- Engineering with programs in Computer & AI, Electrical, Mechanical, Petroleum and Engineering Management
- Healthcare Technologies, comprising Anesthesia Technology, Dental Technology, Optometry and Vision science, and Radiology and Sonar.
- International Studies
- Law
- Pharmacy

== Student life ==
As of 2025, AUIB serves a student body of approximately 2,700 students.

AUIB graduated its first class in May 2025. The ceremony included 38 graduates. Officials "hope the graduation will mark the beginning of a new era in higher education in Iraq rooted in modernity, openness and international academic standards."

== Initiatives ==
=== Research Centers ===
The Continuing Education Institute (CEID) collaborates with all AUIB colleges and industry partners to deliver seminars, workshops, training programs, and courses that lead to globally recognized diplomas and certificates.

The Center for Climate Change, Water Security, and Environmental Sustainability (CWE) at AUIB is advancing research, education, and policy solutions that address the environmental challenges facing Iraq and the MENA region.

=== The American Space ===
The American Space is a collaborative initiative between AUIB and the U.S. Embassy in Baghdad. The facility offers a range of programs, including workshops, seminars, and performances. The American Space includes the Digital Hub, to support video production, podcasting, and digital art. The American Space also provides resources for English language learning and guidance on studying in the United States.

=== The UNESCO Chair ===
AUIB has a UNESCO Chair on Education for Health and Well-Being. Aligned with AUIB’s College of Education and Human Development and in partnership with Vanderbilt University’s Peabody College, the Chair seeks to foster interdisciplinary collaboration, advance research, and contribute to the well-being of Iraqi society.

=== Library and Press ===
AUIB Press is the publishing arm of the American University of Iraq–Baghdad. AUIB Library serves as an academic resource center, offering services and collections to support the university community.

== See also ==
- American University of Beirut (AUB)
- American University in Dubai (AUD)
- List of universities in Iraq
- American University of Bahrain (AUBH)
