= Victory Base Complex =

American military complex in Baghdad

Coordinates: 33.243822°N 44.219979°E

Victory Base Complex (VBC) was a cluster of U.S. military installations surrounding Baghdad International Airport (BIAP) during the Iraq War. The primary component of the VBC was Camp Victory, the location of the Al-Faw Palace, which served as the headquarters for the Multi-National Corps – Iraq, and later as the headquarters for the United States Forces – Iraq.

== Installations ==
=== Camp Cropper ===
Camp Cropper was a holding facility for security detainees.

=== Camp Dublin ===
Camp Dublin was part of VBC and was the headquarters of the Iraqi Federal Police - Special Training Academy, including a secluded part in which an Italian Carabinieri Contingent was hosted. The scope of the latter was to provide a Gendarmery training to the Iraqi Federal Police (IFP), as part of the NATO Training Mission - Iraq and according to the prerogatives of this Italian Armed Force which performs police functions in its homeland. Italy withdrew its Carabinieri, terminating the training after a long and proficient cooperation with the Iraqi, in 2011.

=== FOB Ferdinand ===
FOB Ferdinand was a U.S. Army Special Forces and Iraqi Special Forces base created in 2007 on Camp Liberty.

=== Camp Liberty ===
The camp was an installation of the United States Department of Defense in Baghdad, Iraq. It was used from 2012 to September 2016 to house members of the People's Mujahedin of Iran, who had been forcibly evicted from Camp Ashraf.

=== Sather Air Base ===
The base was operated by the United States Air Force and attached to Baghdad International Airport.

=== Camp Slayer ===
The base contained the former Al Radwaniyah Presidential Complex and contains several man-made lakes, a man-made hill (result of the man-made lakes), the Ba'ath Party House, the Victory Over America Palace, Perfume Palace, and dozens of smaller luxury homes for Ba'ath Party notables.

During the Iraq War, it was most notable for being the headquarters of the Iraq Survey Group until 2005.

==== Perfume Palace ====
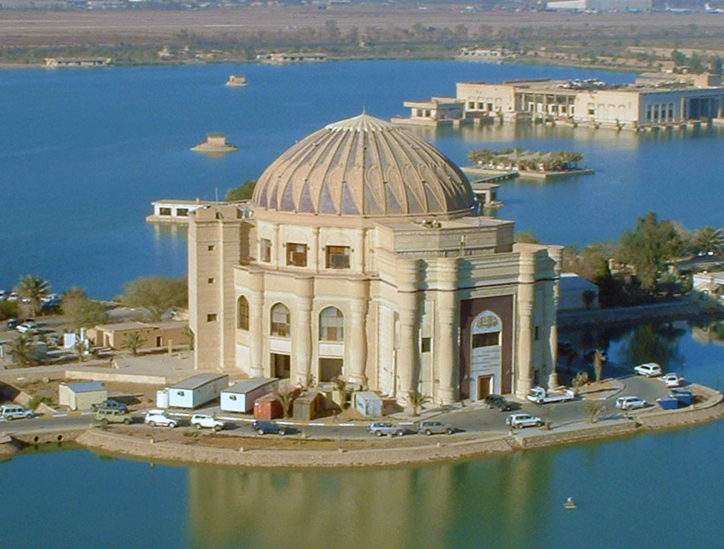
Perfume Palace during US occupancy, with Ba'ath Party Palace in background

The Perfume Palace was untouched during the US shock and awe bombing campaign due to its circular dome, which closely resembled a mosque. Following the invasion, the Palace was used as the main headquarters of the Iraq Survey Group and received minor damage from insurgent mortar fire, during the US occupancy.

==== Ba'ath Party Recreation Palace ====
Ba'ath Party Recreation Palace was located in the center of a manmade lake, just southeast of Baghdad's International Airport. The building was split into four main quadrants, one of which suffered a direct hit during the US shock and awe campaign. The four quadrants are separated by two covered, air-conditioned boat landings. The quadrants consisted of a theater, ballroom, conference room and swimming pool. Shortly after the 2003 US invasion, the building was heavily looted.

==== Victory Over America Palace ====
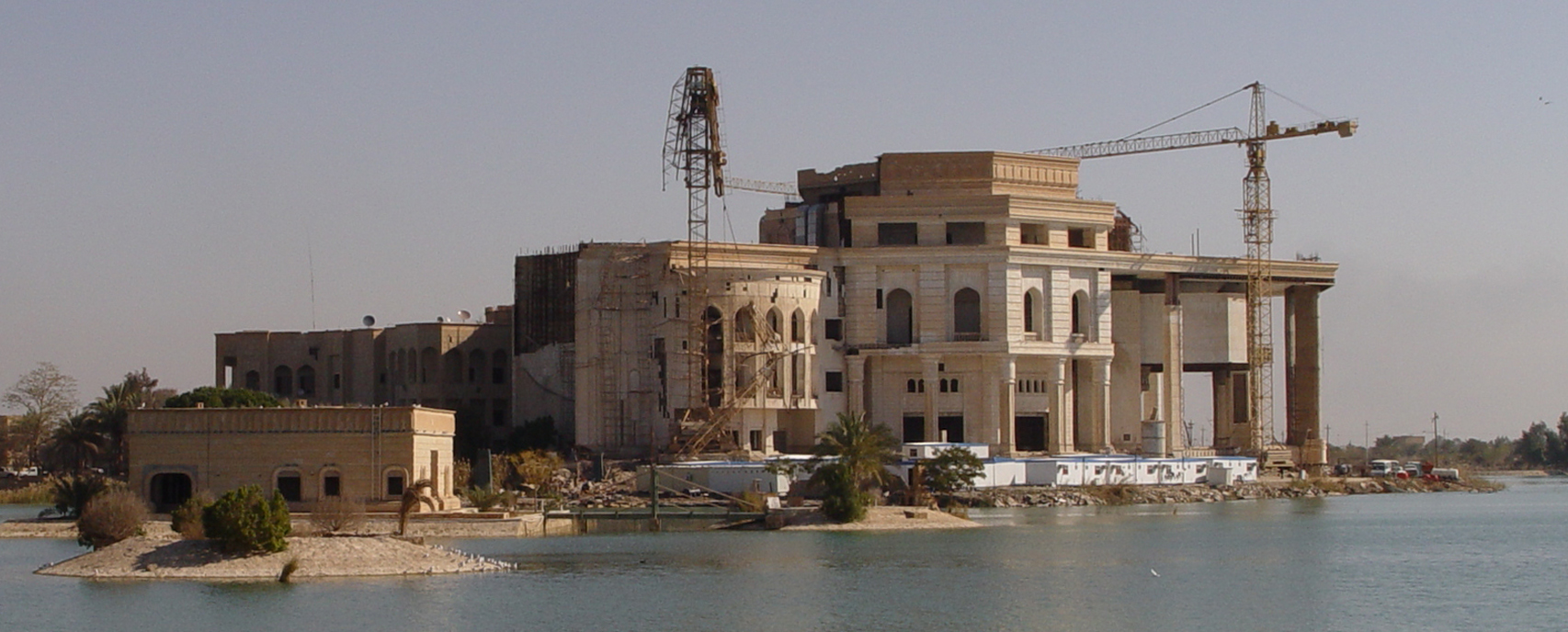
Victory Over America Palace, where construction stopped in 2003

Construction of the Victory Over America Palace was commissioned by Saddam Hussein following his assertion of victory over the US, ending the 1991 Gulf War. Construction was brought to an abrupt halt during the shock and awe campaign of the US in 2003, receiving a direct hit and leaving one of the construction cranes standing limp, with its boom collapsed from the explosion. The Victory Over America Palace was constructed immediately behind, and adjacent to, the smaller Victory Over Iran Palace. The two palaces are frequently confused for a single building, and one or both are sometimes mislabeled.

==== Uday House ====
One of many homes of Uday Hussein, Uday House was located just southeast of Baghdad International Airport. Uday House is famous for being one of, if not the only, private residence that was targeted and hit with cruise missiles during the US shock and awe campaign. (Not to be confused with the villa owned by Nawaf az-Zeidan, where Uday and his brother Qusay were killed by US forces.)

==== Flintstone House ====
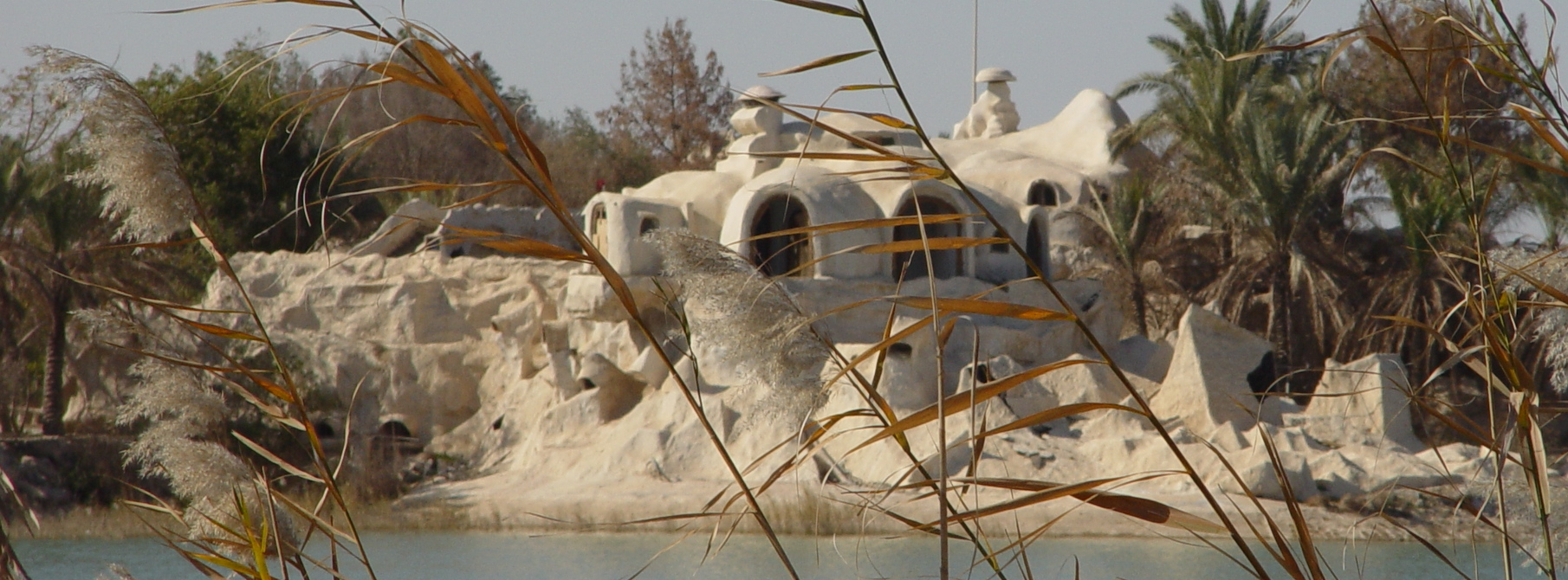
Flintstone House (2004)

With much of Saddam Hussein's palace complexes shrouded behind stone walls, few knew much about the facilities inside. The Flintstone House received notoriety with US soldiers due to its unique appearance and was thus named since little else was known about the facility prior to the US occupation of the site. The facility is best described as an elaborate playhouse for children, in its prime having running water, operable kitchen and elevators. The name "Flintstone" conveys a comparison to the animated sitcom The Flintstones, due to the facilities Stone-Age appearance.

=== Camp Striker ===
Camp Striker was one of several logistical and life support bases within the Victory Base Complex, Baghdad, Iraq (near Camp Victory). Amenities on Camp Striker include a Burger King, Pizza Hut and Green Beans Coffee Cafe, as well as an AAFES Base exchange and several third-party markets. The Dining Facility (DFAC) was purported to be the second largest in Iraq. In November 2007, the 1.2-mile main road on Striker was paved.

Camp Striker was established in 2003 by the 2nd Brigade, 1st Armored Division (United States), known as the "Strike Hard" Brigade. Members of the brigade are referred to as "Strikers". Although the spelling of the camp has been at times spelled as "Stryker" (as in the armored vehicle), the spelling was officially fixed as "Striker" in January 2009 by order of the Victory Base Complex garrison commander.

=== Camp Victory ===
The camp contained the Al-Faw Palace, which served as the headquarters for the Multi-National Corps – Iraq and later United States Forces – Iraq.

=== Victory Fuel Point ===
The Victory Fuel Point fuel thefts were a series of thefts of diesel and jet fuel in 2007 and 2008 from the United States Army's Victory Fuel Point and Camp Liberty fuel depots in the Victory Base Complex near Baghdad International Airport in Iraq. In the thefts, a group of Americans and Nepalese using fake military identification cards and forged requisition documents tricked US military personnel into allowing them access to the depot to fill up tank trucks with millions of gallons of fuel. The thieves would then drive the trucks to downtown Baghdad and sell the fuel on the Iraqi black market.

In 2008, after an investigation by the Federal Bureau of Investigation and the National Procurement Fraud Task Force, Lee William Dubois, 32, of Lexington, South Carolina pleaded guilty in federal court to participating in the fuel scam. On August 25, 2009, Dubois was sentenced to three years in prison. Dubois had paid $450,000 to the government he had made through his participation in the crime.

On April 24, 2009, 12 more Americans, including Robert John Jeffery, 55, of Neosho, Missouri, were indicted by a federal grand jury in Virginia for the same offense. The indictment alleges that the twelve stole at least 10 million US gallons (38,000 m^{3}) of fuel from the Iraq depot. Jeffery's trial is set to begin on August 10, 2009.

On July 24, 2009, Robert Young, 56, pleaded guilty to stealing $39 million of fuel between October 2007 and May 2008 from Camp Liberty of which he kept $1 million in personal profit. Young's sentencing was set for October 30, 2009.

On July 27, 2009, Michel Jamil, 59, of Annandale, Virginia pleaded guilty to conspiracy to steal government property. Jamil was paid $75,000 for his help with the fuel thefts. His sentencing was scheduled for November 13, 2009.

Two US Army officers who assisted in the thefts, Captain Austin Key and Chief Warrant Officer Joseph Crenshaw, went on trial in 2009 and 2010. Key has pleaded guilty. Crenshaw was acquitted of the charges on January 6, 2010.

== See also ==
- Iraq War order of battle 2009
