= 2011 raid on Camp Ashraf =

Iraqi military operation

Raid on Camp Ashraf
- Part of the Iraq War
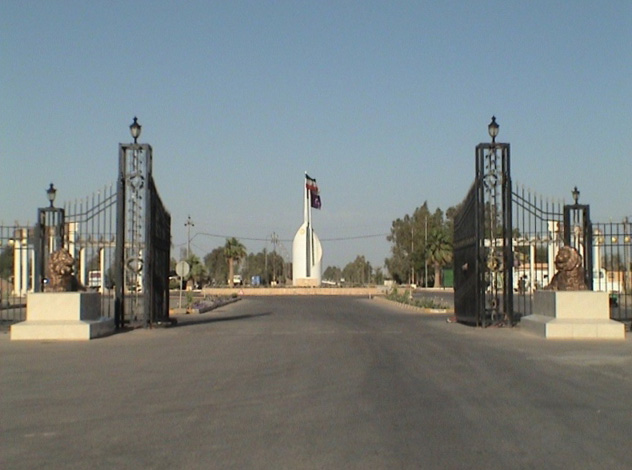
- Gated entrance to Camp Ashraf
- Type: Military raid
- Location: Camp Ashraf, Iraq
- Target: Mujahedin-e Khalq
- Date: April 8, 2011; 04:45 (UTC+3)
- Executed by: Iraq
- Casualties: 34 killed 318 injured

On April 8, 2011, the Iraqi Army launched an assault against the People's Mujahedin of Iran (PMOI or MeK), an Iranian opposition group based at Camp Ashraf who aim to overthrow the theocratic regime in Iran.

Although the Iraqi government claimed that three individuals were killed, framing the incident as resisting a military operation at the camp, the UN said 34 people were killed and 318 injured. A United Nations inspection team discovered 28 bodies, including those of women, concluding that the majority had died from gunshot wounds. Iraqi authorities have not permitted journalists to access the camp. The attack was denounced as a "massacre" by PMOI leader Maryam Rajavi and U.S. Senator John Kerry.

== Background ==
Camp Ashraf is located northeast of the Iraqi town of Khalis, about 120 kilometers west of the Iranian border and 60 kilometers north of Baghdad in Iraq's Diyala Governorate. This was the base of the PMOI during the attack. The camp was named in honor of Ashraf Rajavi, a prominent political prisoner during the Shah's regime, who was later killed by the clerical regime on February 8, 1982.

The PMOI is an Iranian opposition group that seeks to overthrow Iran's theocratic regime. In 1997, Iran persuaded the Clinton Administration to designate the MEK as a Foreign Terrorist Organization (FTO) on the U.S. State Department's list with the expectation that this gesture would lead to the normalization of relations with Iranian officials. In 1986, the French government forced the PMOI to leave Paris, and their headquarters subsequently moved to Baghdad, Iraq, where they remained aligned with the country until the 2003 U.S. invasion of Iraq.

In 2003, residents of Camp Ashraf were disarmed by the U.S. military, and received legally protected status under the Fourth Geneva Convention. General David Petraeus, who held the position of deputy commander of the allied coalition forces, asserted that the transfer of responsibility for Camp Ashraf to the Iraqi government was contingent upon a direct assurance from Iraqi authorities that the protected status of the camp's 3,400 residents would be maintained.

In 2009, the U.S. military handed over control to the Shi'a-dominated Iraqi government, which repeatedly vowed to close the camp as then Prime Minister Nouri al-Maliki had reportedly been trying to bolster his country's ties with Iran. The Iraqi Army had raided Camp Ashraf prior to the April 2011 attack. In July 2009, Iraqi security forces entered the camp, killing at least nine people and injuring some 400 people. Iraq and Iran have designated the PMOI a terrorist group, though not the United States, European Union or United Nations.

== Raid ==
Prior to the raid, tensions had been building between the Iraq army and Ashraf residents, who feared an impending attack as soldiers built up their forces outside the camp. The Iraqi general, Ali Ghaidan Majid, who led the raid, stated it was in response to Ashraf residents tossing rocks at his troops and throwing themselves in front of military vehicles. The PMOI said the attack was a "full-scale military assault with armoured vehicles".

Following the raid, which left 34 dead, the PMOI released footage filmed and edited by members of the group, which show Iraqi soldiers firing at unarmed civilians at Camp Ashraf, and using military vehicles to herd and run down crowds of people. Iraqi authorities, on the other hand, claimed that only three people were killed resisting a military operation to return land from camp residents to farmers.

Rupert Colville, spokesperson for the U.N. Office of the High Commissioner for Human Rights in Geneva, reported that a team of U.N. observers witnessed 28 bodies remaining at the camp during their visit to the compound. According to Colville, most of the deceased appeared to have died from gunshot wounds, and some were women. Additionally, a Western diplomat based in Baghdad stated that three of the bodies appeared to have been crushed to death, likely as a result of being run over by a vehicle.

== Reactions ==
- Europe – Over 100 members of the European Parliament endorsed a formal statement calling on the United States and the United Nations to assist in safeguarding the individuals residing in the camp.
- Iraq – Iraqi government spokesman Ali al-Dabbagh released a statement in which he said that "This organisation [the MKO] must be removed from Iraqi territory by all means, including political and diplomatic, with the co-operation of the UN and international organisations."
- UN – UN High Commissioner for Human Rights Navi Pillay condemned the Iraqi military operation and called for a long-term solution to Camp Ashraf's residents: "There is no possible excuse for this number of casualties. There must be a full, independent and transparent inquiry, and any person found responsible for use of excessive force should be prosecuted... "I am well aware that this is a contentious group [the PMOI], with a complicated history, but leaving them to fester in Camp Ashraf was never going to be a solution."
- US – U.S. Senator John Kerry, Chairman of the Senate Foreign Relations Committee, condemned the raid as a "massacre" and stated the situation at Camp Ashraf was "untenable": "United Nations confirmation of the scope of last week’s tragedy at Camp Ashraf is deeply disturbing and the Iraqi military action is simply unacceptable. Corrective action is imperative. First, the Iraqis must stop the bleeding and refrain from any further military action against Camp Ashraf. Second, the Iraqi government has announced a full investigation into the massacre and it must be thorough and serious."

== See also ==
- 2013 Camp Ashraf attack
- 2023 Tirana camp raid
