= Somayeh =

Somayeh (Arabic : سمیه) is the Persian pronunciation of the Arabic feminine given name Sumaya. Notable people with the name include:

- Somayeh Tohidlou (born 1979), Iranian blogger and political activist
- Somayeh Mahmoudi, Iranian politician and current member of the Parliament of Iran
- Somayeh Mohammadi (born 1980), Iranian member of the Mujahedin-e Khalq
- Somayeh Abbaspour (born 1985), Iranian Paralympic archer
