= Somayeh Mohammadi =

Iranian political activist (born 1980)

- Born: 8 September 1980 (age 46); Iran
- Years active: present

Somayeh Mohammadi (Persian: سمیه محمدی), born (8 September 1980), is a Canadian-Iranian woman and a member of the Iranian dissident group Mujahedin-e Khalq (MEK). She has received media coverage concerning controversy about her membership of the MEK.

According to her father, Mostafa Mohammedi, a former MEK member, Somayeh is being held hostage by MEK, but she publicly denies these claims and has filed a lawsuit against him in Albania where she currently lives at the MEK headquarters. Somayeh claims that her father is an undercover agent of Iran. According to Somayeh, she joined the MEK voluntarily in 1998 "seeking freedom and democracy for Iran."

== Membership in MEK ==
Somayeh Mohammadi left Canada with her parents when she was 15 years old for Camp Ashraf, Iraq in 1997. Mostafa was an MEK member at the time, as was usually collecting donations for the MEK. She said his presence is a "security problem" for other members of the MEK.

In an interview, Somayeh accused her father of being an Iranian intelligence agent. She said that she can go everywhere she wants but just chooses not to. The MEK have stated that Somayeh does not like to leave Camp Ashraf, but Somayeh's parents have asked to visit their daughter outside the camp and without her MEK supervisors. Somayeh's mother said: "Somayeh is a shy girl. I knew that she wants to leave but she is under pressure because the MEK member and officer have threatened her."

According to Der Spiegel (website), on 17 October 2013, a letter was sent by Somayeh to Canadian authorities asking them to return her to Canada again, as soon as possible. She is one of about 2000-3000 members of the Mujahedin-e Khalq who are living inside the groups' camp, named Ashraf 3, in the city of Durrës.

== Background ==
Somayeh lives in MEK headquarters in Albania. She emigrated from Iran to Canada with her family in 1994. Since 1997, her parents claim to have been attempting to bring her home. Somayeh had gone to Iraq to visit Camp Ashraf in 1997, never returning to Canada. According to her father, the MEK kidnapped his daughter from Canada when she was a teenager, when they convinced him to allow his daughter for a two-week training camp in Iraq, but she and her brother never returned. According to The Guardian, "the MEK insists Somayeh does not wish to leave the camp, and released her letter accusing her father of working for Iranian intelligence." According to Somayeh Mohammadi's lawyer, the Albanian prosecution rejected to take the case because Somayeh said she was not being kept in the MEK against her will. The lawyer also said that she and her family had been threatened by unknown people online for representing Somayeh Mohammadi.

Mostafa Mohamadi, Somayeh's father moved to Canada in 1994 to seek political asylum. During their trip to Albania, they claim they were followed by two Albanian intelligence agents. Mostafa stated, "We are not working against any group or country. We are only trying to visit our daughter outside the MEK camp. She can choose freely to stay in camp or come back to her home in Canada with us." Somayeh said that she voluntarily left Canada in 1998 for joining the MEK like another Iranian. Somayeh published a letter in which she accused her father of being an Iranian intelligence agent.

== Reaction ==
In a letter published in 2018 to Albanian authorities, she alleges that her father created fake blogs in her name as part of an online propaganda campaign and applied various forms of pressure in an attempt to make her surrender and cooperate with Iranian authorities. Recently Somayeh announced in a video interview inside the MEK that she wants to be a member of the group. The Mohammadis have responded with open letters to their daughter and to Albanian politicians, asking for a meeting with their daughter.

As Somayeh says, she has published her whole story in a book in Persian and English to describe her father's efforts to abuse her, as well as she accuses her father to play the role as an undercover Iranian agent in the Ashraf and Liberty camp killings in Iraq.

Morteza Payeshenas has directed a documentary film called “An Unfinished Film for My Daughter, Somayeh” (2014) about her story. It was aired by the Islamic Republic of Iran Broadcasting.

Somayeh Mohammadi said that the videos and photos used in the documentary were "given to the regime’s intelligence to make a documentary against PMOI."
