= 2013 Camp Ashraf massacre =

Terror attack at Camp Ashraf in Iraq

- Part of Iraq Conflict
- Location: Camp Ashraf, Iraq
- Date: September 1, 2013
- Deaths: 52
- Victim: People's Mujahedin of Iran

The 2013 Camp Ashraf massacre (also referred to as the September 1 massacre) was a terrorist attack on the Camp Ashraf refugee camp of the People's Mujahedin of Iran (PMOI/MEK), leaving 52 PMOI members dead and 7 missing. Iraqi security forces were believed to be responsible for the assault, with guidance and support from the Iranian government.

On 17 December 2013, Foreign Policy magazine stated that "U.S. intelligence officials believe that Iranian commandos took part" in the attack "and then spirited [away] seven members of the group back to Iran." U.S. officials said members of Iran's Islamic Revolutionary Guard Corps "helped plan and direct the assault on the camp... Gunmen from two of Tehran's Iraqi-based proxies, Kata'ib Hezbollah and Asaib Ahl al-Haq, then carried out the actual attack." Regarding Iraqi involvement, a U.S. official said, "Iraqi soldiers didn't get in the way of what was happening at Ashraf, but they didn't do the shooting."

== Reactions ==
- UN – In a statement, UN Secretary-General Ban Ki-moon said he "deplores the tragic events in Camp Ashraf." The UN human rights office and the United Nations Assistance Mission for Iraq (UNAMI) also condemned the attack.
- US – The U.S. State Department condemned "the horrific attack." The statement added, "We also note the troubling statements issued by the Iranian Revolutionary Guard Corps (IRGC) praising the attack, and call on the Government of Iran to use whatever influence it might have with groups that may be holding missing persons from the camp to secure their immediate release."
- EU – High Representative of the European Union Catherine Ashton said, "I condemn in the strongest terms the killings that took place at Camp Ashraf."
- UK Foreign Minister Alistair Burt stated, "I am appalled to hear of the violence at Camp Ashraf in Iraq, which we understand has resulted in the death of many camp residents. We condemn this utterly, and our thoughts go out to the families of the victims."
- Amnesty International – The human rights organization called for "the Iraqi authorities to conduct a thorough and impartial investigation."

== See also ==
- 2011 Camp Ashraf raid
- 2023 Tirana camp raid
