= Camp Liberty shooting =

2009 mass shooting at U.S. military base in Iraq

- Part of Iraq War
- Location: 33.3002°N 44.2465°E; Camp Liberty. Baghdad, Iraq
- Date: May 11, 2009
- Attack type: Mass shooting
- Weapon: M16 rifle
- Deaths: 5
- Verdict: Investigation closed, Russell guilty on all counts

On May 11, 2009, five United States military personnel were fatally shot at a military counseling clinic at Camp Liberty, Iraq by Army Sergeant John M. Russell. In the days before the killings, witnesses stated Russell had become distant and was having suicidal thoughts.

Russell was charged with five counts of murder and one count of aggravated assault. Officials stated there was an argument at the Camp Liberty Combat Stress Center and Russell was being escorted back to his unit at Camp Stryker when he took an unsecured M16 rifle from his escort, drove back to the clinic, and opened fire on unarmed personnel.

== Background ==
John M. Russell
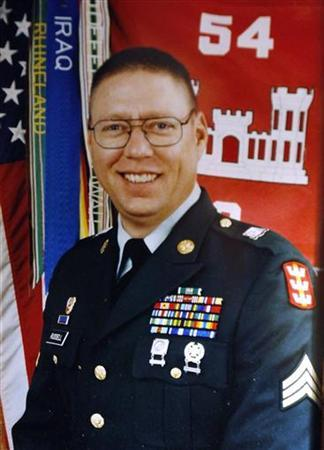
- Born: 1965 (age 60–61); Sherman, Texas; U.S.
- Status: Incarcerated
- Conviction: Premeditated murder (5 counts)
- Penalty: Life imprisonment without parole

Details
- Imprisoned at: United States Disciplinary Barracks

Sergeant John M. Russell (born 1965) was serving his third tour of duty in Iraq as a communications NCO with the 54th Engineer Battalion. According to a fellow NCO, Russell was a quiet soldier who seemed to have trouble with new computer systems and learning how to make repairs. Russell was "very good" with traditional radio devices, but a lack of new skills degraded his performance and relationship with peers. Over time, the NCO said Russell became increasingly distant and visibly disturbed. He had been previously diagnosed with depression and dyslexia. In the days before the killings, witnesses said Russell became distant and started having suicidal thoughts.

Russell had been to the Camp Liberty Combat Stress Clinic on three prior occasions. On May 11, 2009, Russell went to the clinic for a fourth time for a noon appointment.

== Killings ==
Officials stated that at Russell's noon appointment at the clinic, there was a heated argument between Russell and clinic personnel. Russell was being escorted back to his unit at Camp Stryker when he took an unsecured M16 rifle from his escort and drove back to the clinic. At 1:41 pm local time, Military Police at Camp Liberty received a report that shots had been fired at the Camp Liberty clinic. Witnesses at the scene saw Russell using an M16A2 rifle. Five U.S. military personnel were killed: U.S. Army Specialist Jacob D. Barton, 20, Sergeant Christian E. Bueno-Galdos, 25, Major Matthew P. Houseal, 54, Private First Class Michael E. Yates, 19, and U.S. Navy Commander Charles K. Springle, 52.

== Court martial proceedings ==
Russell was charged with five counts of murder and one count of aggravated assault. On May 15, 2012, prosecutors decided to seek the death penalty, overruling a pre-trial hearing recommendation that Russell's mental "disease or defect" made capital punishment inappropriate. Lead defense attorney James Culp stated he would pursue an insanity defense, alleging treatment Russell received just prior to the killings was "mental health mistreatment" and "a significant causal factor" in the massacre.

=== Mental health claims ===
Under already contentious circumstances, the decision by military prosecutors to seek a death sentence against Sgt. Russell re-energized a blame game that pitted Russell's defense attorneys against the U.S. Army psychiatric team their client partly targeted at the Camp Liberty Combat Stress Center.

Lead defense attorney James Culp called treatment Russell received just prior to the killings "mental health mistreatment" and "a significant causal factor" in the massacre, leading him to pursue a "first-ever" insanity defense.

News feature stories have subsequently appeared supporting, and rebutting, that argument. An indictment of combat zone mental health care in the U.S. military, an August 1, 2012 Bloomberg BusinessWeek story suggested the three counselors Russell saw for about 2.5 hours total are culpable, and could have prevented the tragedy.

But in an interview, one of those counselors, psychiatrist (then Lt. Col.) Michael Jones, counters in detail. Jones, who roomed with victim Matthew Houseal and survived the shootings by escaping through a window, instead describes a combat stress team that was "competent, well-trained, and empathetic" and a soldier, Sgt. Russell, who wanted to leave the Army at any cost.

In 2013, before the tribunal at Joint Base Lewis–McChord, Russell pleaded guilty to five counts of unpremeditated murder to avoid a possible death sentence. The plea deal stipulated that the prosecution would be able to make a case the murders were indeed premeditated. In May 2013, the jury agreed that the murders were premeditated, meaning Russell now faced a mandatory life sentence. The judge was then given the choice over whether to give him a chance of parole. Russell was ultimately sentenced to life in prison without parole.

== See also ==
- 2003 Camp Pennsylvania attack
- 2005 Deaths of Phillip Esposito and Louis Allen
- 2007 Fort Dix attack plot
- 2009 Fort Hood shooting
- 2009 Lloyd R. Woodson case—Arrested with military-grade illegal weapons he intended to use in a violent crime, and a detailed map of the Fort Drum military installation
