= Manëz =

- Administrative unit
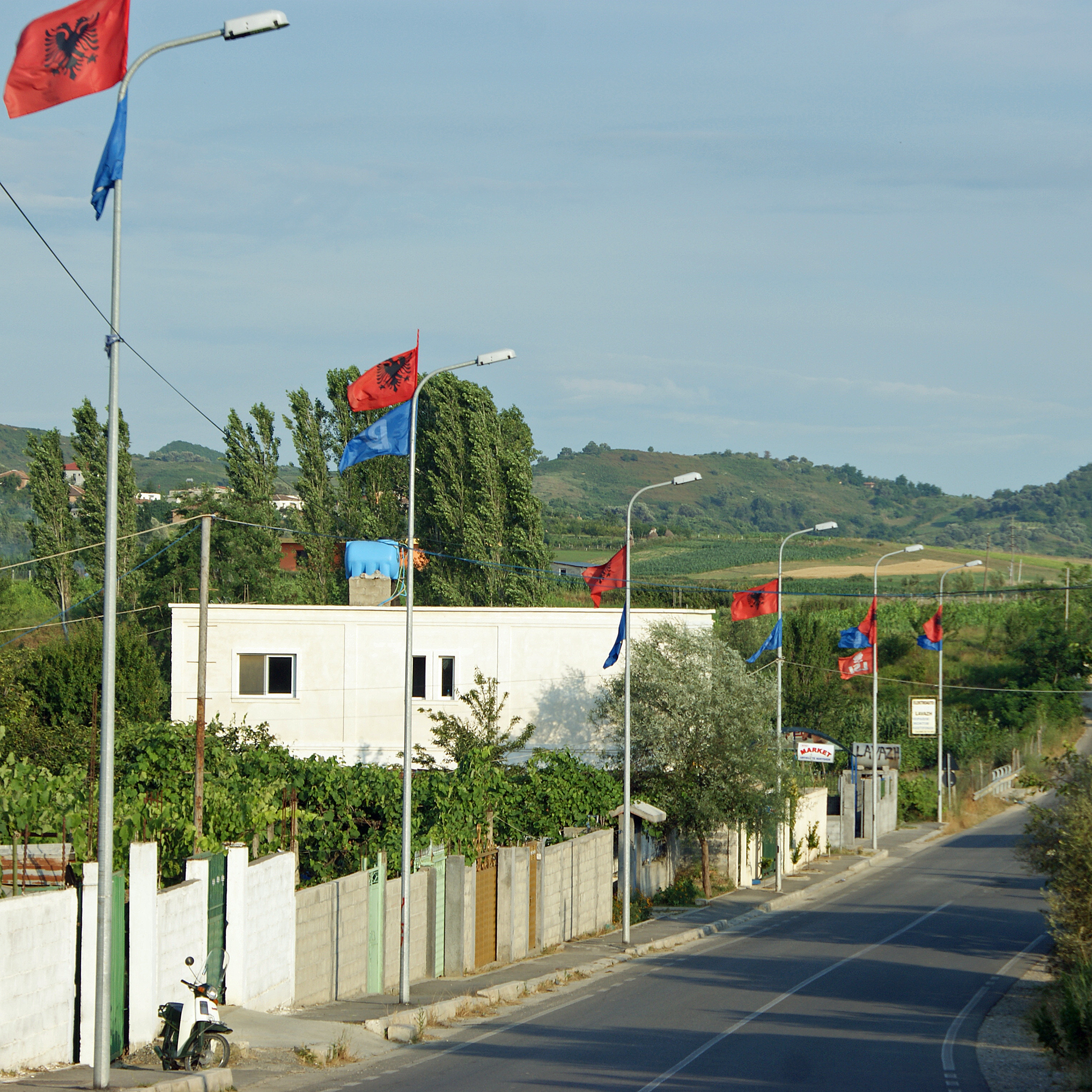
- Street in the municipality after the local elections in 2011

- Location within Albania
- Coordinates: 41°26′N 19°35′E
- Country: Albania
- County: Durrës
- Municipality: Durrës
  - Administrative unit: 49.12 km^{2} (18.97 sq mi)

Population (2023)
  - Administrative unit: 7,185
  - Administrative unit density: 146.3/km^{2} (378.8/sq mi)
- Time zone: UTC+1 (CET)
  - Summer (DST): UTC+2 (CEST)
- Postal Code: 2011
- Area Code: (0)572

Manëz or Manzë is a town and a former municipality in the Durrës County, western Albania. At the 2015 local government reform it became a subdivision of the municipality Durrës. The population at the 2023 census was 7,185.

Historical population
Year	Pop.	±%
1989	6,857	—
2001	7,587	+10.6%
2011	6,652	−12.3%
2023	7,185	+8.0%

The town is known for Camp Ashraf 3, the headquarters for the exiled Iranian political group, the People's Mujahedin of Iran (PMOI/MEK).

== See also ==
- People's Mojahedin Organization of Iran#Settlement in Albania (2016–present)
