= Camp Ashraf 3 =

Headquarters of the People's Mojahedin Organization of Iran

Camp Ashraf 3 Persian: اشرف۳
- Camp
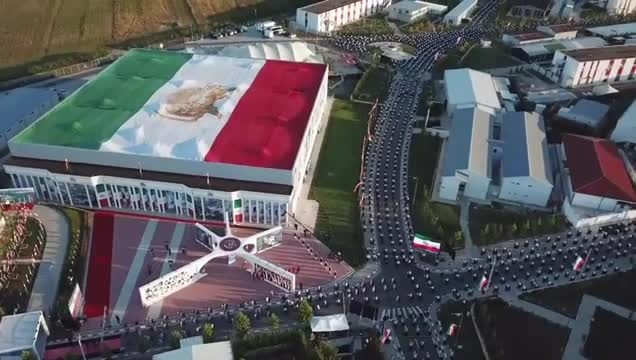
- An aerial view of Ashraf-3 during a ceremony.

- Manëz, Durrës County, Albania
- Coordinates: 41.42961422872088°N 19.576240813335183°E
- Country: Albania
- County: Durrës
- Municipality: Manëz
- Established: 2019

Camp Ashraf 3 (Persian: اشرف۳) serves as the current headquarters of the People's Mojahedin Organization of Iran, located in Manëz, Durrës County, Albania. The camp is located in an area between Tirana and the coastal city of Durrës. In 2013, following the closure of Camp Liberty, members of the Mojahedin organization were transferred to various European countries, predominantly Albania, for humanitarian reasons.

== History ==
In 2013, the Albanian authorities agreed to a request from the United States to accept approximately 3,000 members of the People's Mojahedin Organization of Iran (MEK). The camp was constructed 15 miles west of Tirana, spanning 34 hectares of farmland. In 2015, Albania and the U.S. government signed the "U.S.-Albania – or Albania-U.S. Strategic Partnership", an effort to cooperate towards security in the region.

Albania did not grant refugee status to the residents of the camp. The United Nations provided a monthly stipend of 30,000 LEK, which expired in 2018. U.S. Republican senator John McCain stated, "Given the history of the Iranian regime’s brutal crackdown on these residents," the MEK should be granted international protection under the 1951 Geneva Convention.

On 13 July 2019, the "120 Years of Struggle for Freedom in Iran" conference was held at the MEK camp in Albania. Former U.S. senator Joe Lieberman delivered a speech at the event.

Since 2013, the People's Mojahedin has organized meetings and invited notable figures such as former U.S. vice president Mike Pence and former secretary of state Mike Pompeo. Rudy Giuliani expressed his admiration, stating that he had "the utmost respect for Albania, both the ruling party and the opposition, who, despite their political battles, agree on refugee status for these freedom fighters." Mike Pence also voiced his support, describing it as a great honor to attend a MEK ceremony at Ashraf 3.

Albanian police have successfully thwarted numerous planned attacks by Iranian agents targeting the camp. In 2019, General Police Director Ardi Veliu stated that Albania's security institutions had foiled a plot to target the dissidents and uncovered an active cell of the Iranian Quds Force's foreign operations unit.

== Residents and daily life ==
Daily activities at the camp focus on supporting the "internal resistance" movement led by dissidents in Iran. The camp features a press room where members gather information on alleged abuses by the Iranian regime, which they consider vital due to the media censorship in Iran. The camp also includes a gym, a small cafeteria, a museum showcasing the MEK’s history, and a recording studio used to produce anti-regime songs and music videos for release on Iranian social media.

In 2018, Tehran correspondent Arron Merat reported that approximately 2,300 MEK members were living in the camp. Merat stated that he interviewed "dozens of defectors" who alleged that MEK commanders used torture to control their members. In response, an MEK spokesperson claimed, "The individuals who are described as ‘former members’ are being used as part of a demonization campaign against the MEK." In February 2020, Patrick Kingsley, a journalist for The New York Times, interviewed Somayeh Mohammadi at the camp. Somayeh claims that her father is an undercover agent of Iran, and that she joined the MEK voluntarily in 1998 "seeking freedom and democracy for Iran."

In 2022, AP News reported that 3,000 members reside in the MEK camp near Tirana, which is guarded by Albanian security forces.

== Raid by Albanian police ==
On June 20, 2023, Albanian police conducted a controversial raid on the camp, during which at least one member was killed. Hundreds of police officers stormed the compound, which is typically safeguarded by a private security team to protect the civilian residents from potential terror attacks by Iranian agents.

Images obtained by The Independent showed elderly men and women confronting lines of officers who sprayed them with multiple streams of chemical spray.

Interior Minister Bledi Çuçi told the media that the police were "enforcing a court order" to seize devices and equipment inside the compound because the Special Prosecution claimed to have "reasonable doubts" about the nature of activity at the camp, suggesting that MEK members were engaging in political activities, which is prohibited under the terms of their agreement to stay in Albania.

After the event, the Islamic Republic of Iran's Ministry of Intelligence officially thanked Albanian authorities for the raid, predicating further efforts to stifle extranational dissent through the statement: "We will carry out operations abroad to chase down members of the opposition Mojahedin-e Khalq Organization."

=== Preludes and possible influences ===
Preceding the raid, in 2022, Albania suffered a cyber-attack that its government and multinational technology companies attributed to the Iranian Foreign Ministry. The attack was believed to be in retaliation for Albania's willingness to host the MEK camp, which hosts a major Iranian opposition group, pushing the Albanian government to suspend diplomatic relations with Iran. The Iranian Foreign Ministry denied its involvement, and noted that Iran itself had suffered cyber-attacks from the MEK.

The camp has faced scrutiny from Albanian media and opposition parties regarding the terms of the 2014 deal and suspicions about the MEK's alleged activities on Albanian soil. Former head of Albanian military intelligence, Ylli Zyla, accused the MEK of violating Albanian law. Some media outlets and analysts suggested that the raid was linked to U.S.-Iran negotiations.

=== Aftermath ===
The raid resulted in one death and 36 other camp residents being injured. Muhamet Rrumbullaku, commander of the Albanian national police, stated that both MEK members and police officers were injured during the raid. The National Council of Resistance of Iran, an organization affiliated with the MEK, claimed that the raid was carried out at the "behest" of the Iranian government, noting that it occurred just days after the group's planned rally was banned in Paris for the first time. French police cited concerns over potential "disturbances to public order" and the risk of pro-Islamic-Republic retaliation as reasons for the ban. However, a week later, a Paris court overturned the ban, allowing members to gather at Place Vauban in the French capital.
