= Al-Faw Palace =

Palace in Baghdad, Iraq

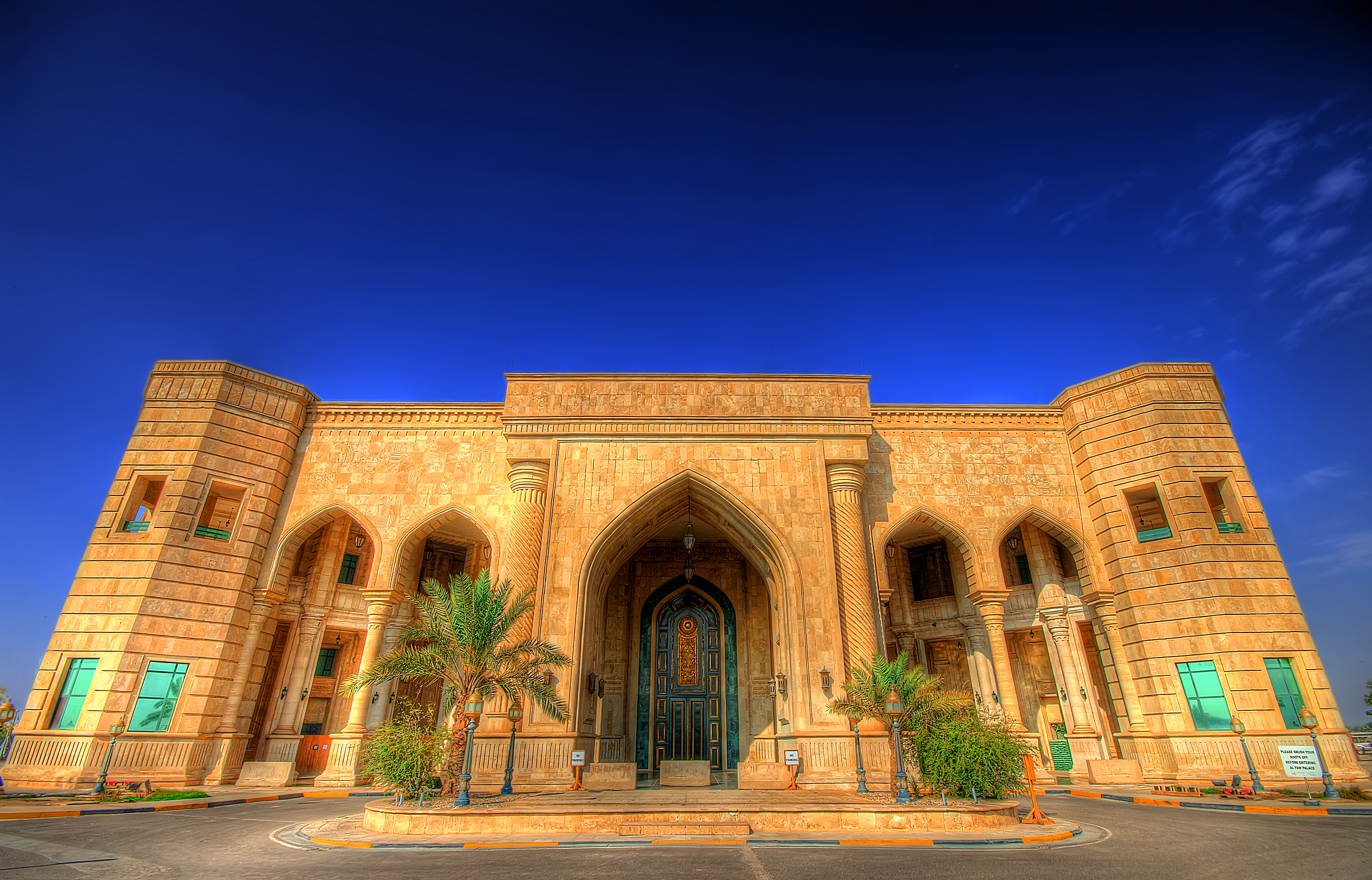
- The gate to the palace
- Interactive map of the Al-Faw Palace area

General information
- Architectural style: Islamic and Neo-Babylonian
- Location: Baghdad, Iraq
- Coordinates: 33.2840°N 44.2561°E
- Year built: 1990s
- Renovated: 2018
- Owner: American University of Baghdad

Technical details
- Material: Brick, stone, and glass
- Floor count: 3

Al-Faw Palace (also known as the Water Palace, Arabic: قصر الفاو) is a palace in Baghdad, Iraq, located approximately 5 km (3.1 mi) from Baghdad International Airport. It was commissioned in the 1990s by former Iraqi president Saddam Hussein to commemorate the Iraqi military’s recapture of the Al-Faw Peninsula during the Iran–Iraq War. The palace, which features opulent architecture and a surrounding artificial lake, was reportedly used by Saddam for duck hunting.

The palace currently serves as the campus of the American University of Iraq - Baghdad (AUIB)

== Background ==
The palace was named after al-Faw, a city located in al-Faw peninsula in the far south-east of the city of Basra. Water canals from Shat al-Arab turned the area into a rich agricultural land. Furthermore, its oil facilities turned the region into one of Iraq's major exports.

Due to the geographic and strategic importance of the peninsula, it became a target of Iranian control during the Iran-Iraq War. In February 1986 the first battle of al-Faw took place which concluded with Iranian units capturing the peninsula. President Saddam Hussein vowed to remove the enemy "at all cost" and in April 1988, the second battle of al-Faw took place with the Iraqi military succeeding in liberating al-Faw peninsula.

After the Kuwait War of 1991, the palace was built in honor of the soldiers who freed the city from Iranian control. Walls inside the palace were inscribed with the epitaph "Victory and glory to the warriors who freed the city from the enemy – The Persians." Despite UN sanctions against Iraq, 2,000 workers were devoted to the project.

Construction on the palace included craftsmen from Morocco, Egypt, and Sudan as well as Iraqi convicts who supplied much of the manual labor. The palace was surrounded by a large moat and luxurious elite-style villas. Among the villas was al-Az villa which was built for Saddam's mother.

== Architecture and description ==
The palace is located in the middle of an artificial lake that diverts from the Tigris River with a large bridge being its only access. The exterior is made of stone. The lush area around the palace stocked villas, games, catfish and carp and used as a hunting and fishing preserve. The main door of the palace is 10 meters high with vaulted ceilings and marble floors.

The exterior includes Italian marble which covers every surface. Gold plating is found in every bathroom. Ceilings are 25 foot ceilings with ornate chandeliers hanging from them. The palace includes an octagonal-shaped rotunda that is three stories large and included 2.56 lights. Saddam's initials are engraved on the walls, columns and ceilings of the palace.

== History after the 2003 US-led invasion ==
=== Iraq War (2003 – 2011) ===
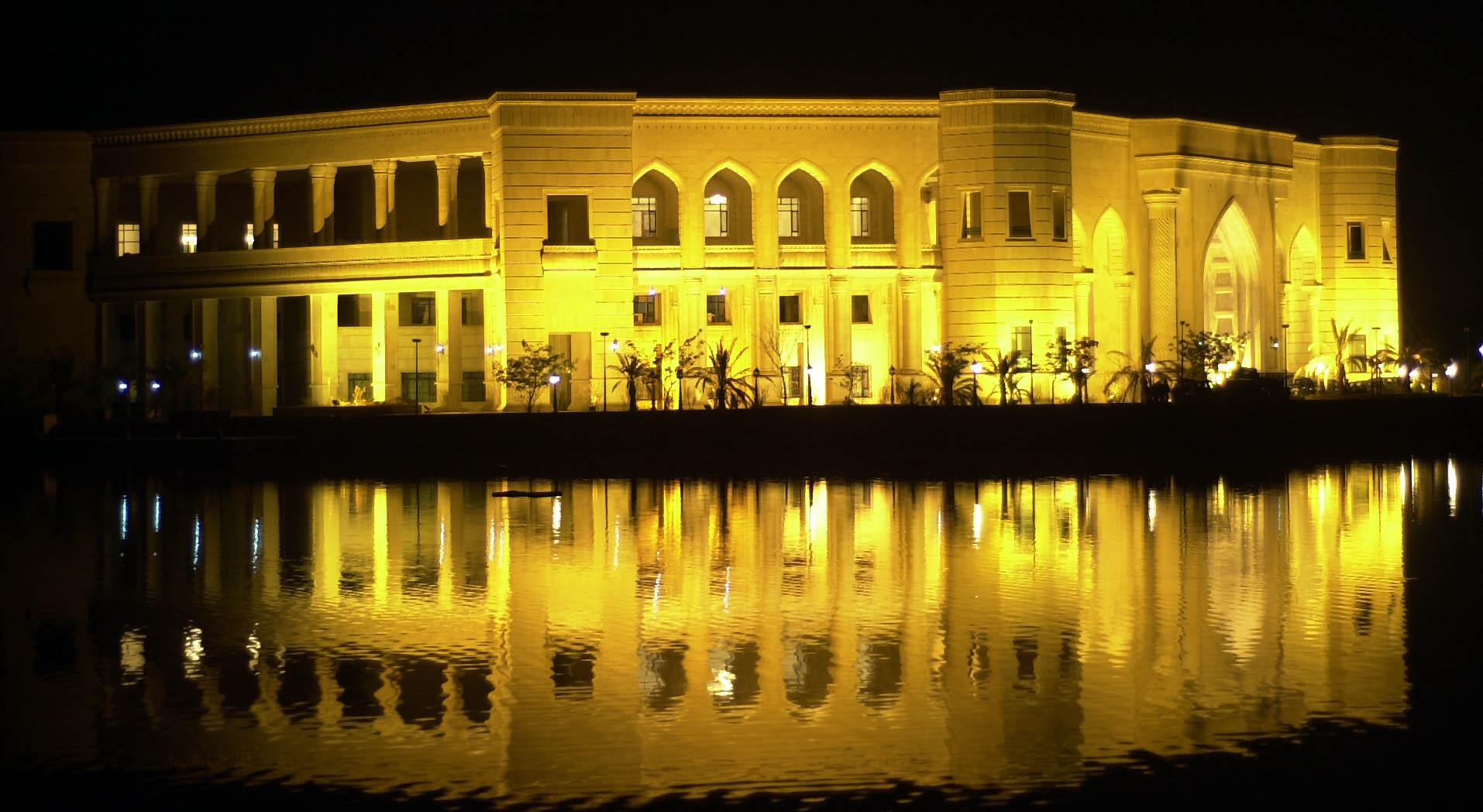
Al-Faw palace, illuminated during the change of command ceremony between III Corps and XVIII Airborne Corps, early February 2005.

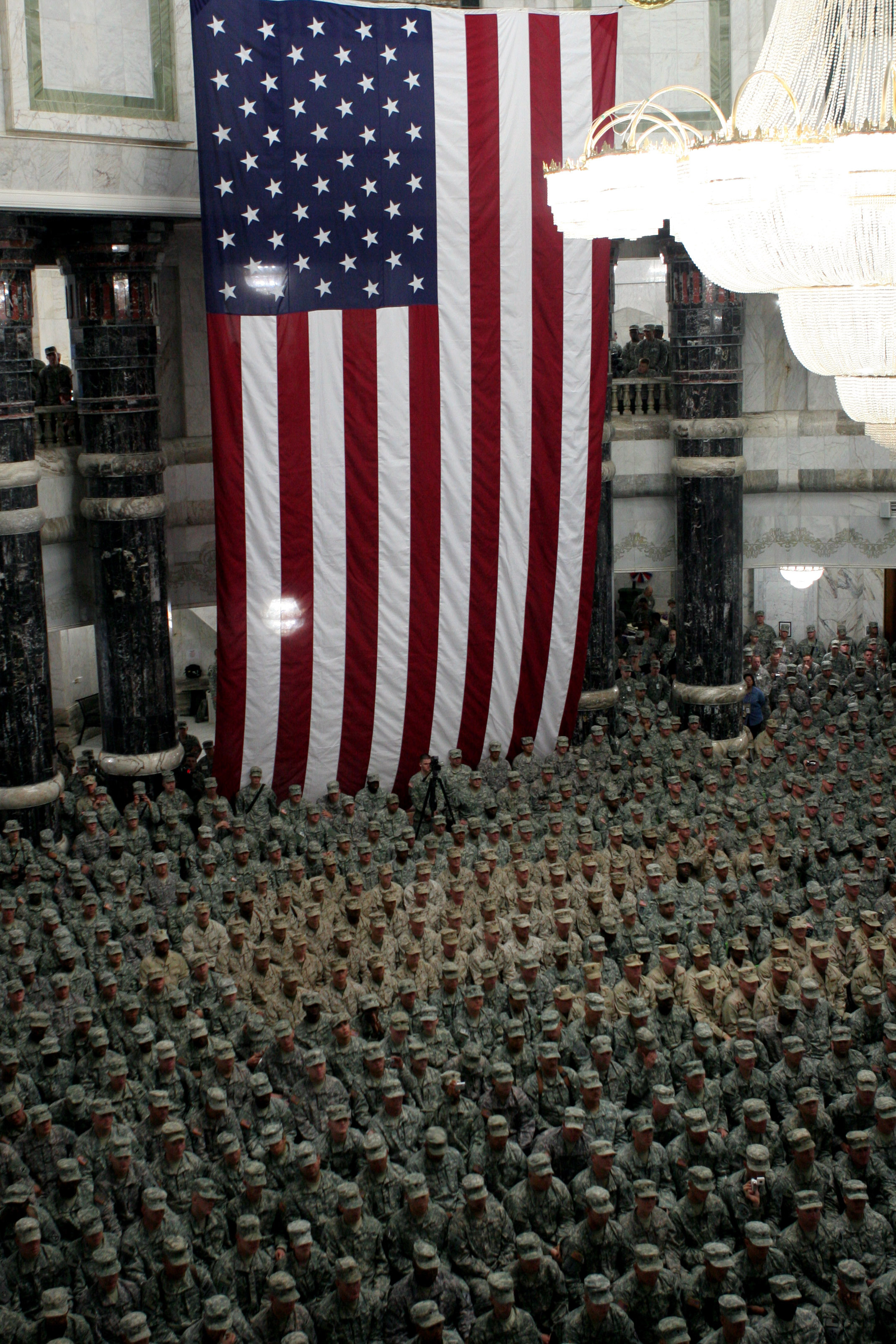
US marines attend mass reenlistment ceremony at the palace in July 4th, 2008.

Al-Faw Palace is situated on a former resort complex about 5 kilometers from the Green Zone, which is now referred to as the International Zone or IZ. The complex contains numerous villas and smaller palaces that at one point housed the largest US/Coalition bases in Iraq (Camp Victory/ Camp Liberty). The palace contains over 62 rooms and 29 bathrooms. Al-Faw Palace was the first palace that the UN teams entered when searching for weapons of mass destruction, but they did not find any. The palace was bombed during the 2003 US-led invasion of Iraq by an F-16 as a "show of force" but Saddam had known that his palaces would be targeted for bombing. As a result, he stored a lot of its furniture in a nondescript complex in Baghdad. At one point the palace was used as a prison for Hussein after his capture in late 2003. In April 2003, the now abandoned and ruined palace that housed stray goats was taken over by American forces under commander David D. McKiernan.

Many of the rooms were converted to serve as offices, and after 2004 the Palace was used as the headquarters for the Multi-National Force - Iraq (MNF-I), along with the Joint Operations Center (JOC), which served for years as 'Mission Control' for the Multi-National Corps - Iraq (MNC-I) and all operational aspects of Operation Iraqi Freedom. There is an artificial lake surrounding the palace that has a special breed of large bass dubbed the Saddam bass, as well as large carp. Saddam formerly used the palace for duck-hunting expeditions.

Because of the very light damage to the al-Faw Palace and other structures located on what was Camp Victory, it is widely presumed that the planners of the 2003 invasion intended that this area would be used as a headquarters and main base area following the capture and occupation of Baghdad. The palace is surrounded by high walls with preconstructed security towers, which contributes to more readily maintaining surveillance and security for the former resort.

In 2009, comedian Stephen Colbert hosted a week of The Colbert Report from the palace in partnership with United Service Organizations.

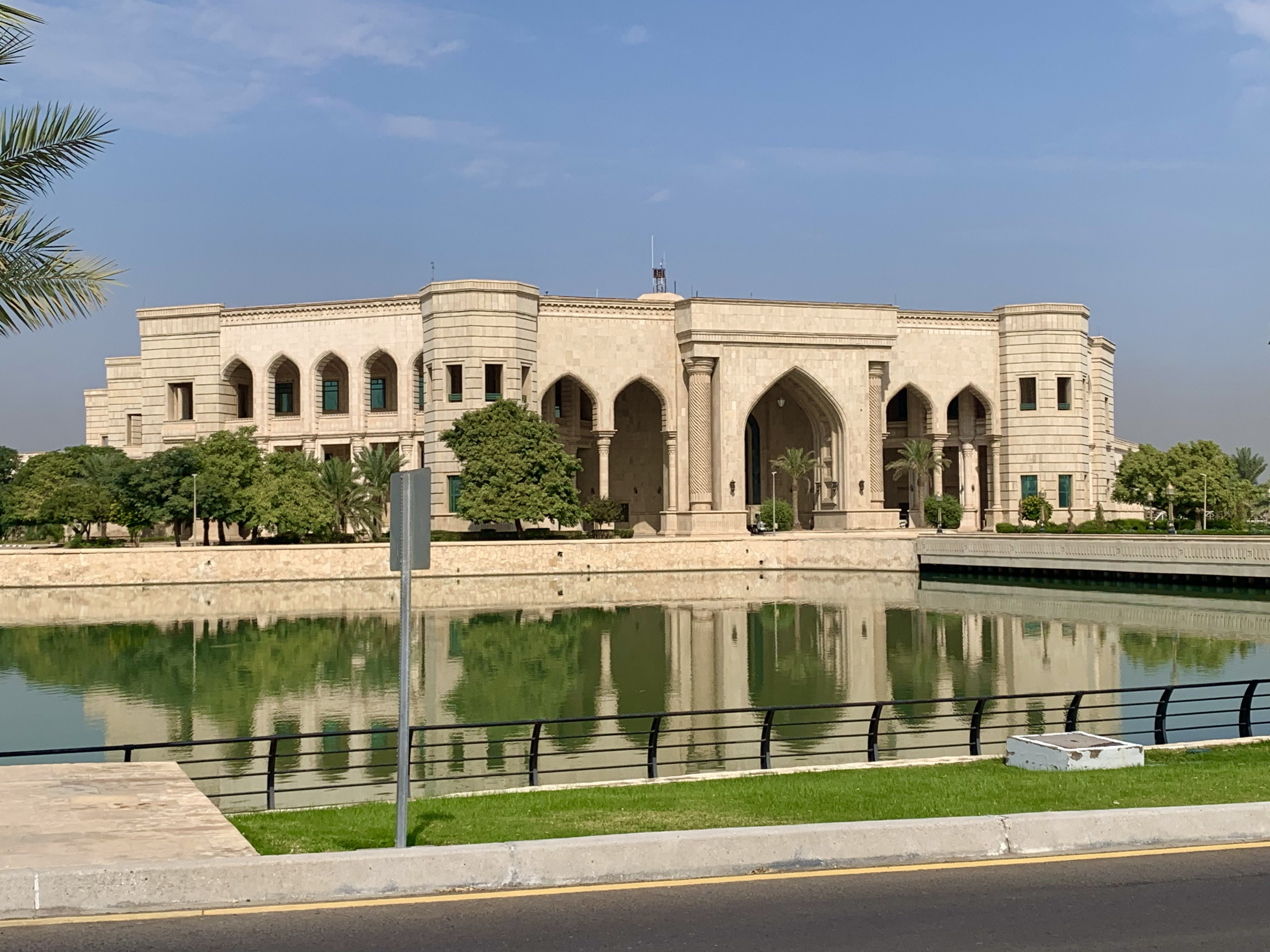
Al-Faw Palace as of October 2023.

On September 1, 2010, a change of command ceremony was held in the palace to commemorate the end of the Iraq War. As a result, the American flag was lowered with the Iraqi flag being left alone to be flown outside the palace. Vice President Joe Biden delivered remarks on behalf of the United States announcing that Operation Iraqi Freedom was over but US involvement in Iraq will continue as Operation New Dawn.

=== Present day ===
The palace was rehabilitated in 2018 and was chosen to be the headquarters for a new university. In February 2021, the private American University of Baghdad was opened and was established in al-Faw Palace, as well as various facilities around the palace.

== See also ==
- Al-Faw Peninsula
- Al-Salam Palace
- Administrative districts in Baghdad
