= Camp Liberty =

Former US military installation in Iraq

Camp Liberty (Camp Victory) (Camp Hurriya) (Camp Al-Tahreer)
- Baghdad, Iraq
- Camp Liberty after 26 December 2013 missile attack.

Site information
- Owner: Iraq

Location
- Coordinates: 33°18′0.94″N 44°14′47.68″E

Site history
- Built: 2003
- Battles/wars: Iraq War
- Events: Camp Liberty killings, Camp Ashraf, 2013 Camp Ashraf massacre

Garrison information
- Occupants: People's Mujahedin of Iran (2012 - 2016); United States of America (former)

Camp Liberty is a former installation of the United States Department of Defense in Baghdad, Iraq. The installation was used from 2012 to September 2016 to house members of the People's Mujahedin of Iran (PMOI, also called MEK), who had been forcibly evicted from Camp Ashraf.

== History ==
=== U.S. Army base ===
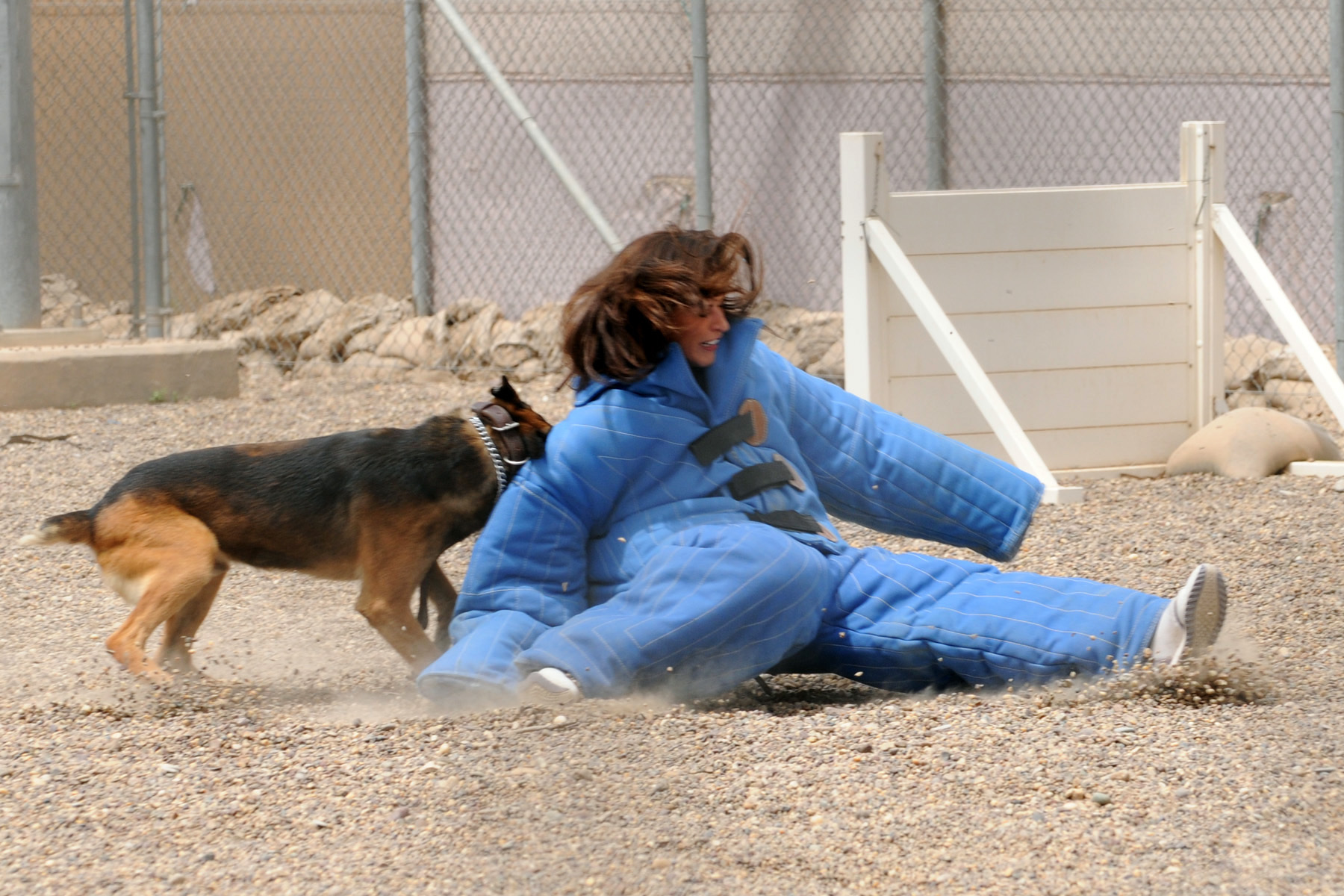
Minnesota Vikings cheerleader Lissa Steffen experiences how it feels to be taken down by a military working dog at the Camp Liberty kennels in May 2010

Camp Liberty first came into existence during the 2003 U.S. invasion of Iraq as Camp Victory North, and was renamed (its Arabic translation is "Mukhayam Al-Nasr") in mid-September 2004 to its later name of Camp Liberty (in Arabic "Mukhayam Al Hurriya"). Other camps that made up the Victory Base Complex include Camp Victory (formerly known as Camp Victory South), Camp Striker, Logistics Base Seitz, and Camp Slayer. The renaming was part of an effort to give U.S. facilities around Baghdad friendlier connotations, and an attempt to resolve the issue of constantly changing facility names.

During the Iraq War, following the American invasion, the base was a large installation of Multi-National Force – Iraq located northeast of the Baghdad International Airport (BIAP), becoming part of the Victory Base Complex (VBC). Camp Liberty was twice the size of Camp Bondsteel in Kosovo, and one of the largest U.S. overseas posts built since the Vietnam War.

=== Camp Liberty killings ===
On 11 May 2009, an American soldier, U.S. Army Sergeant John M. Russell, opened fire on his fellow service members within the camp at a counseling clinic center, killing five before being subdued and taken into custody.

=== Forcible eviction of PMOI residents from Camp Ashraf to Camp Liberty ===
Under pressure by the Iraqi government, whose declared will is to expel the People's Mujahedin of Iran (PMOI/MEK) from Iraq, but who was aided as well by the United Nations Assistance Mission for Iraq (UNAMI) under the pretext to preserve their security, nearly all 3,400 MEK residents of Camp Ashraf were forcibly moved to Camp Liberty in 2012. This helped partly to convince the United States to remove the MEK from its list of designated terrorist groups.

The Working Group on Arbitrary Detention of the UN Human Rights Council has categorized, in its Opinion of May 2012, the status of the MEK residents in Camp Liberty/Camp Hurriya as arbitrary detention and called on the Iraqi government for the "immediate release and lifting of all restraints upon the free movements of these persons". It reiterated and extended this vote in his Opinion of August 2012, additionally considering it "appropriate to refer the allegations concerning conditions in Camp Ashraf and Camp Liberty to the relevant human rights mechanisms for appropriate action".

=== 2013 rocket attacks ===
A rocket and mortar attack left at least eight dead and nearly 100 wounded occurred at Camp Hurriya on 9 February 2013. Iranian residents of Camp Liberty and their representatives and lawyers appealed to the UN Secretary-General and U.S. officials to let them return to Ashraf, which they say is 80 times larger than Liberty and has concrete buildings and shelters that offer more protection. They argue that this move is all the more imperative because according to the UN Refugee Agency and the US embassy in Baghdad, resettlement will take anywhere from three to 10 years. So, the residents would be at risk of further attacks and the move to Ashraf would not hinder their resettlement. The United States has been working with the UN High Commissioner for Refugees (UNHCR) on the resettlement project.

On 20 April 2013, 20 explosions hit Camp Liberty/Camp Hurriya. Its residents accuse the Iraqi government of failing to offer adequate protection or medical care.

A deadly rocket attack occurred on 26 December 2013, killing four Iranian dissidents and wounding about seventy. This was the last of a total of four rocket attacks at Camp Liberty in 2013. The destructive power of the 26 December attack was particularly high, as in addition to previously used rockets, missiles hit the camp which had about 10 times explosive power. Iraqi authorities have repeatedly denied involvement in attacks on the group. However, in a rare claim of responsibility for attacks on the MEK, Wathiq al-Batat, commander of the al-Mukhtar Army militia, admitted his group had fired rockets at the camp. This army is a relatively new Shi'ite militia, which has said it is supported and funded by Iran. Batat is a former leader of the more well-known Kata'ib Hezbollah militia.

The UNHCR called on the government of Iraq to urgently scale up security measures in the camp to ensure the safety and security of its residents. UNHCR urgently reiterated the need to find solutions for the camp's residents, and appealed to countries to find places for 1,400 persons from Camp Liberty that had been submitted for relocation since 2011, stating that only 311 residents were secured to third countries so far.

=== October 2015 attack ===
The National Council of Resistance of Iran informed and warned on activities in Iraq by Iranian Quds Force, led by Qasem Soleimani, aimed to massacre Camp Liberty residents via a joint operation with Iraqi forces. In August 2014, the Iraqi government started to block food, fuel and water supplies. Former UNAMI chief Ad Melkert, who, in fall 2009, had strived to find a mediated solution for residents to remain protected in their original home city Camp Ashraf, appealed to UNAMI to hold the Iraqi government accountable for creating the descent conditions in Liberty and for blockading the delivery of daily life essentials. In October 2014, the Committee on Political Affairs and Democracy of the Parliamentary Assembly of the Council of Europe reiterated its concern over the situation, namely over a recent statement of the Iraqi Minister of Justice, in which he said that if Iran asked for the extradition of the residents of Camp Liberty, Iraq would deliver them.

In December 2014, UNHCR informed that it has been working since February 2012 to identify "individuals with international protection needs" and to find solutions outside Iraq for the remaining population of still 2,746 individuals. On 30 January 2015, 100 Members of the Parliamentary Assembly of the Council of Europe in a written declaration urged Europe, USA, and UN that "Camp Liberty, home to Iranian exiles in Iraq, be recognized as refugee camp under supervision of UNHCR and specially medical and fuel siege be ended."

On the evening of 29 October 2015, another heavy rocket attack killed more than 20 residents in the camp. As with regard to many past attacks to Camp Liberty and Camp Ashraf, evidence points to Iran paramilitary forces being the perpetrators. UNHCR strongly condemned the attacks and stated that the residents are entitled to protection against expulsion or forced movement to any place where their lives or freedom would be threatened, and informed that it has supported the relocation of more than 900 residents to safe third countries since 2011; as however, approximately 2,160 people still remain, UNHCR renewed its calls upon governments of other countries to find ways to offer long-term solutions. The European Iraqi Freedom Association (EIFA), led by Struan Stevenson, Chairman of the European Parliament's Delegation for Relations with Iraq from 2009 to 2014, who was deeply involved in diplomacy aiming to safeguard the lives and human rights of the residents of Camp Ashraf, stated that to avoid further bloodshed just condemning the atrocity is not enough. EIFA urged the US to provide air cover for Camp Liberty, the UN to "stop any further obfuscation and officially recognise Camp Liberty as a refugee camp under its direct supervision and protection" and asked that the "international assistance to Iraq must be suspended forthwith until the security of the Camp Liberty residents is assured".

=== Relocation to Albania ===
UNHCR announced that by the end of 2015 it has relocated more than one third of the residents, about 1100 persons, to other countries. This was achieved with the cooperation and flexibility of the residents, in particular their commitment to meeting the bulk of the travel costs and living expenses. It also mentioned Albania's contribution to receive more than three-quarters of the relocated residents, and renewed its appeal for help to all countries in light of the potential for more attacks to the remaining 1970 persons. As a result of the efforts made by the National Council of Resistance of Iran in conjunction with an international political network, and the UNHCR, the relocation process was successfully concluded in September 2016 when the last remaining refugees left the camp for Albania.

== Bibliography ==
- Stevenson, Struan (2015). Self-Sacrifice – Life with the Iranian Mojahedin. Birlinn, Edinburgh. ISBN 978-1-78027-288-7.
- Boumedra, Tahar (2013). The United Nations and Human Rights in Iraq. The Untold Story of Camp Ashraf. New Generation Publishing. ISBN 978-1-909740-64-8.

== See also ==
- Iraq War order of battle 2009 for United States military in Iraq
- Victory Fuel Point fuel thefts
- Camp Ashraf
- 2013 Camp Ashraf massacre
- List of United States Military installations in Iraq
