= Camp Victory =

Former U.S. military base in Baghdad, Iraq

Coordinates: 33.241°N 44.226°E

- Baghdad International Airport grounds
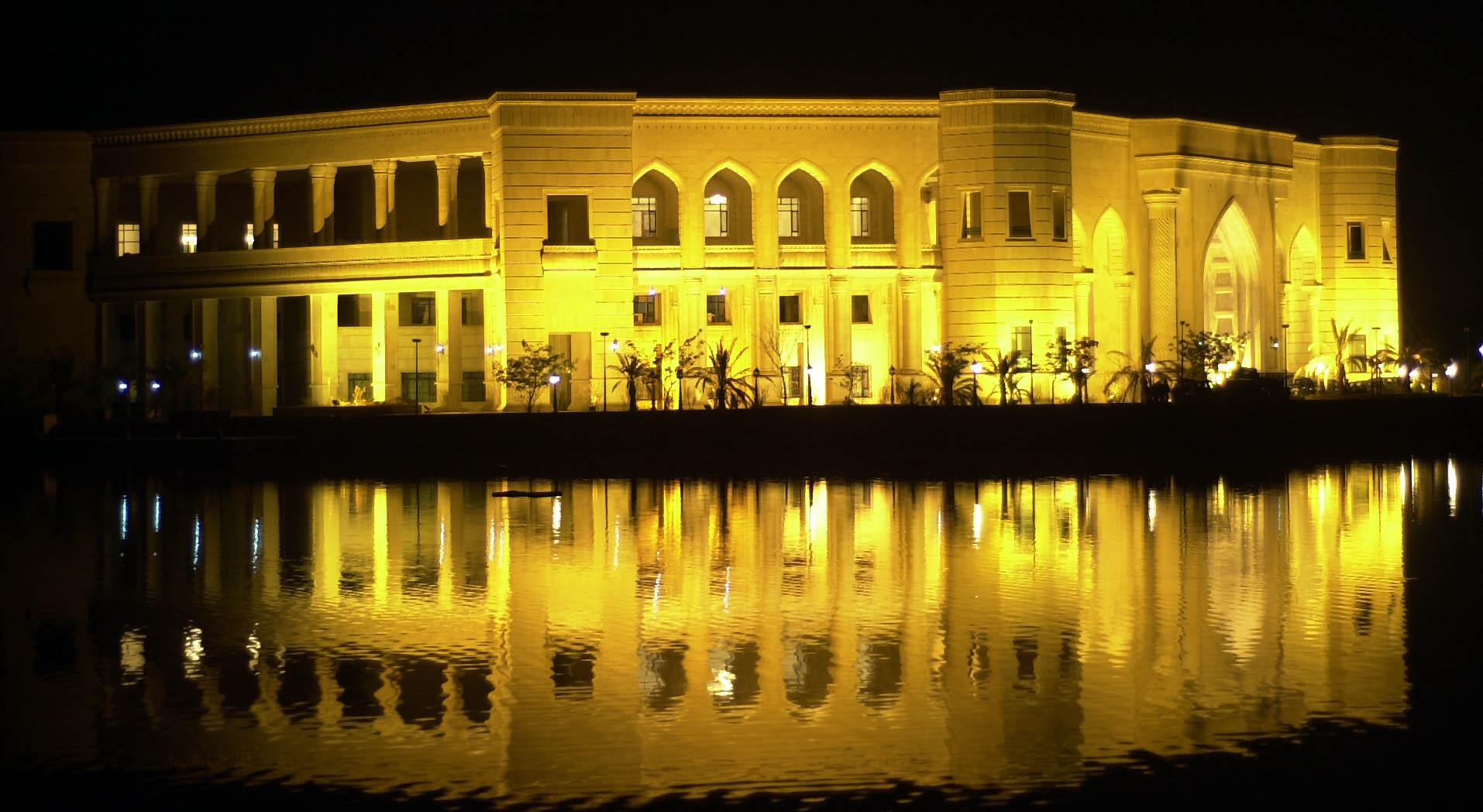
- Al-Faw Palace illuminated during the change of command ceremony between III Corps and XVIII Airborne Corps, February 2005.

Site information
- Type: Former logistics and command facility
- Owner: Iraq
- Controlled by: United States (2003–2011); Iraq (2011–present)

Site history
- Built: 2003
- In use: 2003 – 1 December 2011 (United States); 2011 – present (Iraq)
- Battles/wars: Iraq War; Iran war

Garrison information
- Past commanders: GEN Lloyd J. Austin (September 2010–December 2011); GEN Raymond T. Odierno (May 2009–September 2010); LTG Lloyd J. Austin (February 2008–May 2009); LTG Raymond T. Odierno (December 2006–February 2008); LTG Peter W. Chiarelli (January 2006–December 2006); LTG John R. Vines (February 2005–January 2006)
- Garrison: XVIII Airborne Corps (September 2010–December 2011); III Corps (February 2010–?); I Corps (March 2009–February 2010); XVIII Airborne Corps (February 2008–March 2009); III Corps (December 2006–February 2008)

Camp Victory was a major United States Armed Forces installation located within the Victory Base Complex (VBC) surrounding Baghdad International Airport (BIAP) in Baghdad, Iraq. The complex served as one of the largest U.S. military installations in Iraq during the Iraq War.

The Al-Faw Palace, which served as the headquarters for Multi-National Corps – Iraq and later United States Forces – Iraq, was located on Camp Victory. The installation lay approximately 5 kilometers (3.1 miles) from BIAP.

The Victory Base Complex consisted of several installations surrounding the airport, including Camp Liberty (also known as Camp Victory North), Camp Striker, Camp Slayer, Camp Cropper, and Sather Air Base. These installations collectively supported coalition military operations, logistics, aviation, and command functions during the war.

== Iraqi control ==
On December 1, 2011, under the terms of the United States–Iraq Status of Forces Agreement, the United States formally transferred Camp Victory and the rest of the Victory Base Complex to the Government of Iraq as part of the withdrawal of U.S. forces from Iraq.

Following the transfer, portions of the former Victory Base Complex were repurposed for Iraqi military use and for diplomatic support facilities operated by the United States Department of State. Part of the complex now hosts the Baghdad Diplomatic Support Center (BDSC), which provides logistics, aviation, and life-support services for personnel associated with the Embassy of the United States, Baghdad.

The base was targeted multiple times during the 2026 Iran war including on the 14 March when drones managed to breach into the base for the first time, and on 21 March, it was set ablaze. On 25 March, a radar and a helicopter were struck. In March 2026, the NATO training and advisory mission, based in Camp Victory, withdrew from Iraq due to pro-Iran militia attacks on the camp. Pro-Iran militia in Iraq stated they would continue strikes "until the last foreign soldier leaves Iraqi soil." In June 2026, U.S. forces left their logistics facility in Camp Victory, intending to return later with more advanced defensive systems.

== Living conditions ==
Camp Victory was named after V Corps, also called Victory Corps, from Heidelberg, Germany. They began to occupy the area in April 2003. Camp Victory had several living support areas; Freedom Village, Dodge Cities North and South, Omaha Beach, Audie Murphy LSAs, Red Leg LSA, the Brickyard along with building 51F, which is commonly known as "Area 51". There were also two smaller living areas reserved for government contractors, as well as a third for employees of an Iraqi contracting company.

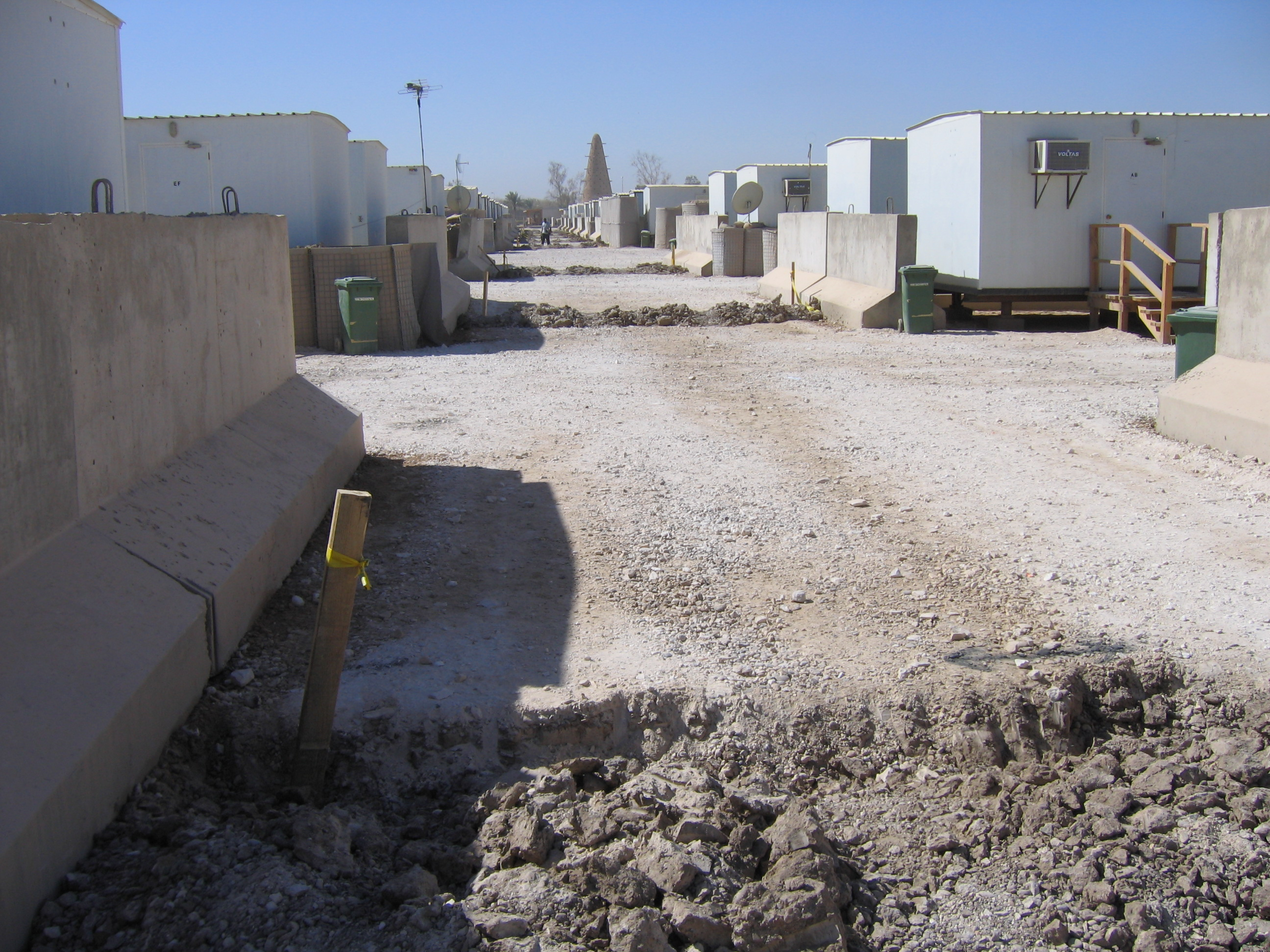
The trailers of Dodge City North in 2005. The tall structure in the distance is a Saddam-era bat house.

Camp Victory contained the Sports Oasis dining facility (DFAC) and the Coalition Cafe. There were also several chain restaurants, located near the PX on Camp Liberty, including a Pizza Hut, a Subway, a Cinnabon, a Burger King, a Taco Bell, and a Green Beans coffee cafe. Additionally, a new bowling center were opened to the northwest of Camp Victory main and a Turkish restaurant/hookah/coffee bar near Lost Lake just east of Dodge City North.

Camp Victory had a small AAFES shoppette south of the Sports Oasis DFAC with an additional Green Beans Cafe, Pizza Hut, Barber Shop, and Turkish novelty goods stores. Two basketball courts also occupy this area and one has been converted to a soccer court. Separating the containerized housing units or CHUs and the eating establishments was "Tumlin Field" a popular spot for American football pickup games. The Tumlin Field sign read "Tumlin Field, cause not all the fighting is done outside the wire".

== Morale, welfare, and recreation ==
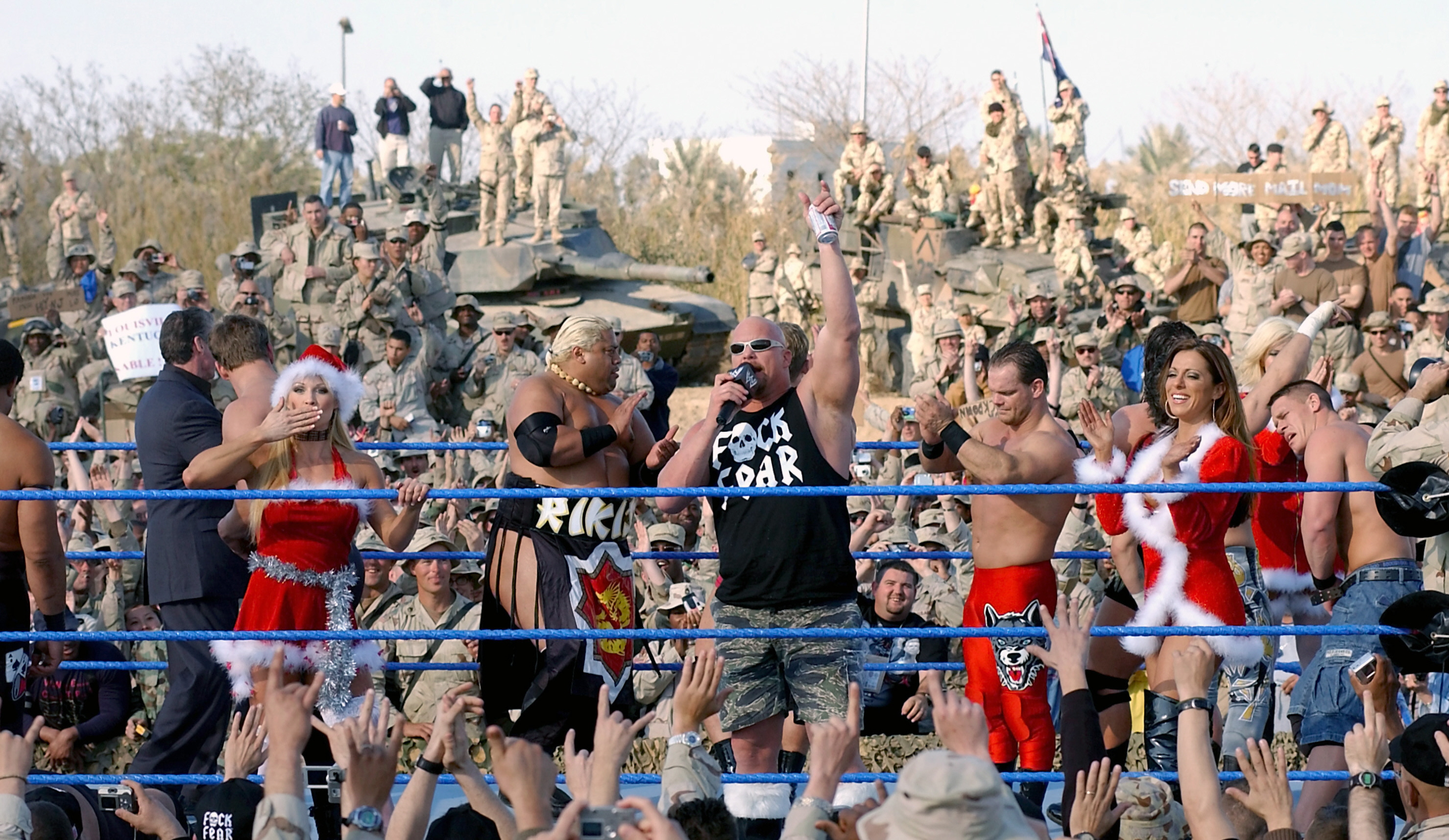
WWE superstars performing for the Coalition troops at Camp Victory, December 2003

Camp Victory was also a common stop for USO tours, including entertainers such as Charlie Daniels, Stephen Colbert, and NFL players. Camp Victory had a well-equipped gym, and was always in use by the many troops on post. There were two Morale, Welfare, and Recreation (MWR) buildings on Camp Victory, one near Building 51F and the other near Dodge City South. They provided free internet access, commercial phones, televisions, and indoor sports equipment such as table tennis and air hockey. Internet access was also available at housing on post to soldiers at a rate of $65 per month, which was provided by Jackal Wireless, a private contractor.

WWE had held their annual Tribute to the Troops at the base several times.

== Cultural references ==
Part of the 2008 film The Hurt Locker was set at Camp Liberty.

Camp Victory was a featured "Santa Cam" location for the 2007 NORAD Tracks Santa tracking season.

It was also featured in season 22 episode 8 of Law & Order in a story centering around a homicide due to burn pits.
