= Camp Ashraf =

Former headquarters of the MEK in Iraq

Coordinates: 34°03′49″N 44°34′24″E

Camp Ashraf (or Ashraf City; Arabic: معسكر أشرف, romanized: Muʻaskar Ashraf) is a camp in Iraq's Diyala Governorate. The camp has a character of a small city with all basic infrastructure, and was previously the headquarters of the People's Mujahedin of Iran (PMOI/MEK). Population in the camp used to be around 3,400 in 2012, but in 2013 almost all were relocated to Camp Liberty near Baghdad International Airport after pressure by then-prime minister Nouri al-Maliki's office.

Camp Ashraf is situated 96 kilometers (59 mi) north of Baghdad near the town of Al Khalis. On January 1, 2009, United States formally transferred control over to the Iraqi government. From 2003 to 2013, Camp Ashraf was attacked several times, the worst being on April 8, 2011, when the Iraqi Army raided the camp and killed as many as 34 people and wounded 318 more.

On September 1, 2013, an attack was directed by Iran's Islamic Revolutionary Guard Corps and conducted by Iranian proxy militias Kata'ib Hezbollah and Asaib Ahl al-Haq, killing 52 civilians belonging to the MEK, with numerous prisoners being abducted to Tehran following the raid.

The Camp was briefly occupied by ISIS in 2014 and remained under the control of ISIS until 2015, when it was recaptured by the Badr Organization, an Iran-backed militia (militia supported by Iran) affiliated with the Popular Mobilization Forces (PMF).

As of 2025, the Camp remains under the control of Iraqi Private Militias affiliated with the Popular Mobilization Units (PMU) and the Islamic Resistance in Iraq (IRI).

== History ==
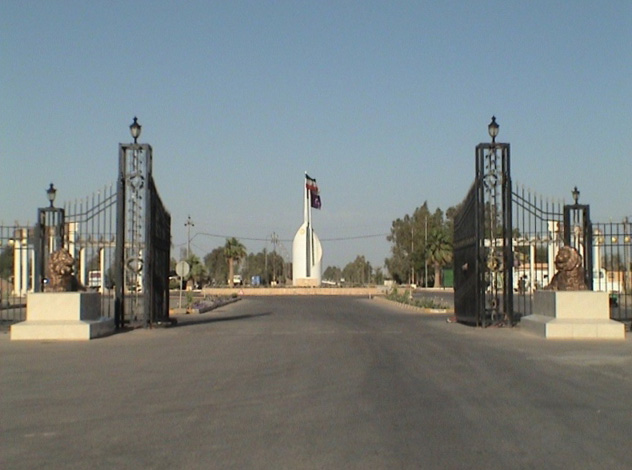
Entrance gate of Ashraf when it was populated by MEK exiles

=== Camp Ashraf under MEK ===
The MEK established its base in Ashraf in 1986 during the Iran–Iraq War. The city of Ashraf was named in commemoration of Ashraf Rabiei, a famous political prisoner at the time of the Shah, a senior member of the People's Mujahedin of Iran and wife of Massoud Rajavi. She was killed in a firefight with the Revolutionary Guard in 1982, after the Iranian revolution.

==== Development of a city ====
MEK members MEK built the camp into a modern city with roads, buildings, as well as educational, social, medical, and sports facilities. They also built agricultural works and a university.

==== Iranian air attacks ====
Even after the cease-fire with Iran, the Iranian Air Force carried out several air raids against Ashraf. The first of such raids was conducted using eight F-4 Phantoms armed with rockets and cluster bombs on 6 April 1992. During this raid, one F-4 was shot down by either insurgent or Iraqi military anti-aircraft artillery and both pilots (Lt. Col Amini and Cpt. Sharifi) were captured and not freed until 1998. Despite threats of response, Iraq was not able to retaliate due to its own fight against Kurdish separatist guerrillas and the Western-imposed no-fly zones that crippled and limited its air force's operations. Another air raid was conducted on 26 May 1993 against Ashraf and Jalat (near Sulaimaniyah) with 12 planes, according to a statement by the MEK. Iranian government news agencies said the attacks were in retaliation for several attacks on Iranian military personnel and oil pipelines in Khuzestan province.

=== Ashraf during US occupation ===
==== Designation as protected persons ====
During the 2003 US invasion of Iraq, Coalition forces launched air attacks against MEK forces. Reports indicated that Coalition attacks had been planned well in advance as part of a purported agreement whereby Iran agreed to support US efforts as long as the US-supported Iran's initiative to destroy Camp Ashraf and its residents. MEK commanders negotiated a ceasefire in April–May 2003, on the basis of which the group relinquished its weapons, including tanks, armored vehicles, and heavy artillery.

Subsequently, different US agencies investigated Camp Ashraf residents, and saw no basis for trying any of the residents for acts of terrorism.

==== Military presence ====
Adjoining the camp was Forward Operating Base Grizzly (formerly FOB Spartan, FOB Red Lion, FOB Gator, FOB Barbarian). The forward operating base is where US and Coalition forces used to reside and were involved in a humanitarian mission designed to oversee control of the camp.

Following the 2003 invasion of Iraq, the MEK negotiated a ceasefire with Coalition forces and surrendered its weapons, including tanks, armored vehicles, and heavy artillery. After investigating Camp Ashraf's residents and finding no basis to prosecute them for terrorism, U.S. authorities designated them as non-combatants and granted them protected person status under the Fourth Geneva Convention in June 2004. The residents remained under U.S. military protection, while the U.S. Army established the Temporary Internment and Protection Facility (TIPF) for members who chose to leave the organization. When control of Camp Ashraf was transferred to the Iraqi government in January 2009, the residents retained protections under international law, and the Iraqi government pledged that none would be returned to a country where they faced a well-founded fear of persecution. Under U.S. military protection, the group was disarmed and became confined to Camp Ashraf. When the U.S. military formally gave control back to the Iraqi government in January 2009, it caused several issues, mainly where Iraq asked for the group to be handed over to them for prosecution. However, the MEK received protection under international law.

=== Transition to Iraqi control ===
On January 1, 2009, the U.S. officially transferred control of Camp Ashraf to the Iraqi government. According to a press release from U.S. Embassy in Baghdad, the U.S. would maintain a military presence at the camp and the Iraqi government would ensure that all residents were treated according to Iraqi law. A State Department spokesman said the Government of Iraq had promised both humane treatment of people at Camp Ashraf and that none would be relocated to a country where they would have "a well-founded fear of persecution".

== Forcible eviction of residents ==
=== 2009 attack by Iraqi forces ===
In late July 2009 conflict erupted when Iraqi forces attempted to enter camp Ashraf to establish a police station without the consent of the MEK. Accounts of the conflict differ. Some sources say Iraqi forces used violence, including gunfire, water cannons, and batons, killing eleven people and injuring about 400; two others later died from their wounds. Videos by Ashraf residents purportedly show these scenes. Iraqi authorities denied using violent methods but said residents used stones, knives, and sharp tools to fight security forces that tried to enter the camp. Journalists were excluded from the area.

Video footage surfaced purportedly showing Iraqi forces trying to repeatedly run down residents with vehicles.

In September 2009, in accordance with their mandate, the United Nations Assistance Mission for Iraq (UNAMI), led by Ad Melkert, Special Representative of the UN Secretary-General, started attempts for mediation between the residents and prime minister Al-Maliki's office. Additionally, as reported by UNAMI issue leader Tahar Boumedra, Chief of the Human Rights Office, it ensured regular visits to the camp for monitoring human rights and as a deterrent against violence. In October 2009, in the frame of UNAMI's mediation, the Government of Iraq announced they would close Camp Ashraf, while the residents responded that neither remaining in Iraq nor returning to Iran were safe options for them; they said to be prepared to move to safe third countries as soon as this become possible and asked for the necessary time for exploring this perspective.

On December 10, 2009, the Iraqi government announced plans to move the MEK from Camp Ashraf to a former detention center, Neqrat al-Salman, about 200 miles (120 kilometers) west of Basra. In response, the MEK refused to comply with the decision. On December 15, 2009, Iraqi government sent a group of its security forces into the camp to urge the residents of the camp to leave the camp. They used loudspeakers and distributed pamphlets calling the residents to join them and leave Ashraf. However, no resident accepted to leave. Media reporters were present on the scene. The UN issued a statement "exiled camp residents must not be deported". UNAMI, led by the UN envoy Ad Melkert disputed Nouri al-Maliki's claim, saying that UN would not embrace the government's efforts to deport Ashraf residents by the end of 2011. Instead, as brought forward by the UNAMI issue leader Tahar Boumedra, all parties should be engaged: the Iraqi government for building civilian camp management capacities in line with international humanitarian standards, the MEK for achieving a more realistic understanding of their reality, and the international diplomatic community.

In a 2010 report, Amnesty International said that "Following months of rising tension, Iraqi security forces forcibly entered and took control of Camp Ashraf ... on 28 and 29 July. The camp, which houses some 3400 members or supporters of the People's Mojahedeen Organization of Iran, an Iranian opposition group had been under US military control since 2003. ... Video footage showed Iraqi security forces deliberately driving military vehicles into crowds of protesting camp residents. The security forces also used live ammunition, apparently killing at least nine camp residents, and detained 36 others who they tortured".

The failure to relocate the camp residents prompted the "Ashrafi Committee", an ad-hoc group of Premier Minister al-Maliki's office, to tighten the embargo on Camp Ashraf. From January 2010 onwards, despite the attempts of UNAMI for the protection of human rights, fuel deliveries, water, and food supply were severely reduced, resident's vehicles were seized, and medical assistance and resident's access to hospital treatment and surgery were denied.

In Spring 2010, the Iraqi Premier Minister's Office in cooperation with the Iranian embassy in Iraq arranged so-called "family visits" of some Iranian government-operated NGOs to destabilize Camp Ashraf. Assisted by the Iraqi army, they set up camp at the gate and fixed loudspeakers around the camp. Over a period of two years, there were around 300 units "blaring threats and insults day and night at the residents".

In his quarterly report to the Security Council of 14 May 2010 pursuant to resolution 1883, UN Secretary-General Ban Ki-moon stressed the rights of residents of Camp Ashraf, to protection against arbitrary displacement in Iraq or forced extradition to Iran.

Brian Binley, a Member of Parliament from the United Kingdom's Conservative Party, also asked for protection of Ashraf.

On 17 October 2010, on the eve of al-Maliki's visit to Tehran, an armed attack by Iraqi forces took place, injuring 10 residents.

On January 7, 2011, assailants bussed from Basra, Amara, Nasiriya, and Baghdad to the gates of the Camp. This was jointly coordinated by the "Ashraf Committee" of al-Maliki's office with the Iranian embassy in Baghdad and backed up by Iraqi security forces. The assailants attacked the camp resulting in 176 wounded. Iraqi forces prevented the wounded, 93 of whom were women, to go to the hospital for treatment.

=== 2011 raid ===
On April 8, 2011, Iraqi security forces in bulldozers and Humvees stormed Camp Ashraf in an action enthusiastically hailed by the Iranian government. The Iraqi government, however, stated it believed that the event was a "riot". According to Amnesty International, video clips of the April 8 clashes "appear to show Iraqi soldiers indiscriminately firing into the crowds and using vehicles to try and run others down". As a conclusion, it was confirmed by a UN human rights official, 34 residents were killed and 318 wounded by Iraqi forces.

During Summer 2011, the Iranian authorities took new suppressive measures for espionage against Ashraf residents by installing two tall communication poles south of Camp Ashraf, preparing the grounds for the next attacks. The Iraqi government said that the MEK must leave the country by the end of 2011.

The Central Investigation Court No 4 of the Spanish National Court, in face of the impossibility of any investigation into the massacres in Camp Ashraf by a government that itself ordered these massacres, took on this case. On July 11, 2011, the court summoned senior Iraqi officers to appear before the court on October 3, 2011, for war crimes. The Iraqi prime minister Nouri al-Maliki was also ordered to appear before the court once he leaves his post as premier that gives him immunity from judicial prosecution.

=== International and UNAMI mediation attempts dealing with Iraq Government's intent for eviction of residents ===
End of April 2011 on a tour to Iraq, the Iraq delegation of the European Parliament, led by the British Conservative Struan Stevenson, was refused by the Government of Iraq to visit Camp Ashraf; it nevertheless issued a statement that it was in favour of a resettlement of the residents to safe third countries. This "Stevenson plan" envisaged registration of the residents by UNHCR as asylum seekers by groups of up to 500 persons at a time, in a safe, UN "blue-helmets" protected place, then transferring them step by step to countries of safety. It was openly rejected by the Government of Iraq, and did not find enough support from the UN and the US.

As a consequence of the April 8, 2011 attacks, UNAMI tried, between May and September 2011, to find a humanitarian solution via official bilateral meetings with Camp Ashraf resident's speakers respectively with the Government of Iraq. In the course of this process, the residents acknowledged that to become asylum seekers and the involvement of the UN High Commissioner for Refugees (UNHCR) was an option for them, with the ultimate target of a safe relocation to third countries; they expressed however high concern over plans for relocation into a transitional facility inside Iraq, as they would become even more vulnerable to armed attacks than in their current city-like settlement. Under the guidance of Ad Melkert, UNAMI started to engage UNHCR into a process of refugee status determination of the residents. By end of September 2011, UNHCR had received more than 3000 applications for asylum by Camp Ashraf inhabitants. On Sept. 29, 2011, UNAMI and UNHCR requested the Government of Iraq to recognize UNHCR becoming engaged in the refugee registration procedure; however, al-Maliki's office rejected this proposal, pointing out that Camp Ashraf as a fortress of Iranian resistance should come to an end.

On Sept. 28, 2011, the EU foreign policy Chief Catherine Ashton appointed Ambassador Jean De Ruyt, a senior Belgian diplomat, as an advisor to advise on the EU response and to better the humanitarian situation in the camp. In the meantime, Maryam Rajavi, head of the People's Mujahedin of Iran (PMOI/MEK), called for the new nominee to visit Ashraf and to demand Iraq drop its bid to close the camp by the end of 2011.

=== Failure of the mediation ===
In August 2011, Ad Melkert was replaced by Martin Kobler as UNAMI Special Representative of the UN Secretary-General. Following a unilateral interpretation made by Premier Minister al-Maliki at the farewell meeting of 28 August 2011, Ad Melkert reiterated that the UN "continues to advocate that Camp Ashraf residents be protected from forcible deportation, expulsion or repatriation contrary to the non-refoulement principle". However, within few weeks after his arrival on 8 October 2011, Martin Kobler internally announced a change of strategy to the UNAMI staff, presuming that residents of Camp Ashraf were "terrorists" and that the Government could not be expected to negotiate with "terrorists", thus UNAMI's new goal would be a Memorandum of Understanding (MOU) with the Government of Iraq aimed to induce relocation. Bowing to Government's ultimatum to expel the residents by end of the year, this agreement was signed at the end of December 2011. In the course of the process, the Government rejected any attempt to find a solution acceptable to all concerned parties, under inclusion of the residents, and which preserved their acquired rights, resulting in a mere displacement, without consent and participation by the residents, to the new temporary transit location Camp Liberty (Camp Hurriya in Arabic) in Baghdad (a one-time U.S. Marine base), where UNHCR would start to determine the resident's eligibility for refugee status.

=== Forcible relocation to Camp Liberty ===
In 2012, as laid down in the MOU, near all of the residents were moved from Camp Ashraf to Camp Liberty, an operation which was presented by UNAMI and Martin Kobler as preventive diplomacy taking into account the main concerns of both actors and as voluntary relocation of people designated by the US as terrorist organization, leading to a safe path to a life outside of Iraq. This policy of Martin Kobler stood in contrast with the opinion of the competent body inside the UN, i.e. the Working Group on Arbitrary Detention of the UN Human Rights Council, who had categorized, in his Opinion of May 2012, the status of the MEK residents in both Camp Ashraf and Camp Liberty as Arbitrary detention and called the Iraqi government for the "immediate release and lifting of all restraints upon the free movements of these persons". This same UN body had reiterated and extended his vote in his Opinion of August 2012, calling for triggering the relevant human rights mechanisms instead of relocation, and had reconfirmed that the conditions in the new location, Camp Liberty "are synonymous with that of a detention centre as there is no possibility of freedom and interaction with the outside world" and that "there is no free movement and within the camp as well, rendering residents as detainees or prisoners. Furthermore, Martin Kobler had commissioned a report from a UNHCR shelter management expert, Martin Zirn, expecting him to certify that the foreseen location, Camp Liberty was matching international standards. However, the resulting draft report stated that the UNHCR cannot "certify and/or verify that the above location meets Humanitarian Standards", "bearing in mind that these are thought for Refugees in Emergencies". In fact, the shelter expert considered Camp Ashraf a community that was facing eviction from a site where they had lived for over 26 years, which is different from a situation of emergencies like a civil war or a natural disaster.

The concerns voiced by opponents to Martin Kobler's policy claiming Camp Ashraf residents would be safer were later confirmed. For example, amongst other deadly or life-threatening events, a rocket and mortar attack leaving at least five dead and 40 wounded occurred at Camp Liberty on February 9, 2013. Iranian residents of Camp Liberty and their representatives and lawyers appealed to the UN Secretary-General and U.S. officials to let them return to Ashraf, which they say has concrete buildings and shelters that offer more protection.

=== 2013 attack ===
On Sept. 1, 2013, 52 MEK members were killed at Camp Ashraf, in what the group claimed was a massacre by Iraqi forces. In a statement, U.N. Secretary-General Ban Ki-moon deplored "the tragic events at Camp Ashraf" and said Baghdad should "promptly investigate the incident and disclose the findings." Hussein Al-Moosawi, a spokesman for Iraqi Prime Minister Nouri al-Maliki, later confirmed that several MEK members had been killed, but denied any involvement of the Iraqi authorities and stated the deaths were caused by infighting among the camp's residents. Officials stated that after the incident, MEK members attacked the local army brigade stationed in the camp and killed 4 Iraqi soldiers. In September and October 2013 letters and messages to President Obama, Senators John McCain, Carl Levin, and others, called for US pressure on President al-Maliki to "hold Iraq accountable for the massacre at Camp Ashraf and to save seven abducted residents". On September 11, 2013, Amnesty International launched an urgent action to the Iraqi government calling for the protection and relief of the seven abducted hostages.

== Camp Ashraf Under the Popular Mobilization Forces ==
=== Badr Organization base ===
As of early February 2015, the camp became a base of the Badr Organization after its successful operation to liberate Diyala Governorate from Islamic State control.

=== Popular Mobilization Units' parade ===
On June 26, 2021, Toofan MRAPs were shown in a parade held by the Popular Mobilization Forces (PMF) at the camp, in Diyala province, Iraq.

=== Warehousing of Zainabiyoun and Fatemiyoun fighters ===
After the fall of the Assad regime in December 2024, hundreds of Iran-Backed Fatemiyoun and Zainabiyoun fighters were warehoused inside complexes in the Al-Qa'im Bases and Camp Ashraf in Iraq's Diyala province by groups affiliated with the Popular Mobilization Forces and Islamic Resistance in Iraq.

=== 2026 Iran War ===
On 7 April 2026, an engineering site operated by the PMF inside Camp Ashraf was attacked by warplanes. Due to the loss of communications in areas surrounding Camp Ashraf, the number of casualties and damages caused by the bombing is unknown. Airstrikes in Basra targeting farms privately owned by Kata'ib Hezbollah leadership killed a senior commander and two other individuals.

== Bibliography ==
- Boumedra, Tahar (2013). The United Nations and Human Rights in Iraq: The Untold Story of Camp Ashraf. New Generation Publishing. ISBN 978-1-909740-64-8.
- Cohen, Ronen (2009). The Rise and Fall of the Mojahedin Khalq, 1987-1997: Their Survival After the Islamic Revolution and Resistance to the Islamic Republic of Iran. Sussex Academic Press. ISBN 978-1845192709.
- Goulka, Jeremiah; Hansell, Lydia; Wilke, Elizabeth; Larson, Judith (2009). The Mujahedin-e Khalq in Iraq: A Policy Conundrum (PDF) (Report). RAND corporation. Archived (PDF) from the original on 22 February 2016.
- Stevenson, Struan (2015). Self-Sacrifice – Life with the Iranian Mojahedin. Birlinn, Edinburgh. ISBN 978-1-78027-288-7.
- Clark, Mark Edmond (2007). "An Analysis of the Role of the Iranian Diaspora in the Financial Support System of the Mujahedin-e Khalq". In Sean S. Costigan, David Gold (ed.). Terrornomics. Routledge.
