= Killings of members and supporters of the People's Mojahedin Organization of Iran =

The killings of members and supporters of the People's Mojahedin Organization of Iran (PMOI), also known as the Mujahedin-e Khalq (MEK), include executions, extrajudicial killings and targeted assassinations carried out in Iran and abroad.

Following the 20 June 1981 Iranian protests and the 1981–1982 Iran massacres, Iranian authorities arrested, imprisoned, and executed thousands of People's Mojahedin Organization of Iran members and supporters. Repression continued throughout the following decades, including the 1988 executions of Iranian political prisoners, in which many PMOI members and supporters were killed.

PMOI members residing in Iraq were also among those killed in attacks on Camp Ashraf and Camp Liberty, including the 2011 raid on Camp Ashraf and the 2013 Camp Ashraf massacre.

== Background ==
=== Crackdown following the 1981 protests ===
On 20 June 1981 Iranian protests, the PMOI called for mass demonstrations against the Islamic Republic. Security forces violently suppressed the protests, killing and arresting demonstrators. In the following days, hundreds more people were arrested, in many cases because of their actual or perceived association with the PMOI or possession of its publications. The repression marked the beginning of a broader campaign against political opposition groups in Iran.

=== Executions during 1981–1982 ===
During the 1981–1982 Iran massacres, Iranian authorities detained thousands of political dissidents and subjected them to torture, enforced disappearance and summary executions. According to the UN Special Rapporteur, most of those executed during this period were members or supporters of the PMOI, although members of communist, socialist and other opposition groups were also among the victims. Individuals were targeted both for involvement in armed opposition and for peaceful political activities, including distributing publications, participating in demonstrations and supporting prisoners' families.

=== Mass executions of 1988 ===
Between July and September 1988, Iranian authorities carried out the mass execution of thousands of political prisoners held in prisons throughout the country. Following a decree issued by Supreme Leader Ruhollah Khomeini, special committees, commonly known as "death commissions", questioned prisoners about their political and religious beliefs. Prisoners who refused to renounce their association with the PMOI were sentenced to death. The majority of those executed were PMOI members and supporters, although hundreds of members of leftist political organizations were also among the victims. Many executions were carried out without fair judicial proceedings, and the bodies of victims were buried in secret or unmarked graves.

=== Attacks on PMOI camps ===
PMOI camps in Iraq were subjected to repeated attacks between 2009 and 2023:

- 28-29 July 2009: Iraqi security forces raided Camp Ashraf, killing at least nine residents and injuring others, according to Amnesty International.
- 8 April 2011: Iraqi security forces entered Camp Ashraf, killing 34 residents, according to the United Nations Assistance Mission for Iraq (UNAMI).
- 2013: Camp Liberty was targeted in four rocket attacks, on 9 February, 29 April, 15 June and 27 December, resulting in 14 resident deaths, according to the US Department of State. Separately, an attack on Camp Ashraf on 1 September killed 52 residents and resulted in the abduction of seven others.
- 29 October 2015: A rocket attack on Camp Liberty killed at least 23 residents and injured dozens, according to Amnesty International.
- 4 July 2016: Another rocket attack struck Camp Liberty, injuring approximately 50 residents, according to Amnesty International.
- March 2018: Albanian authorities reportedly foiled a planned attack against a gathering of PMOI members celebrating Nowruz in Albania. The discovery was publicly announced by Albanian police in October 2019.
- 20 June 2023: Albanian police raided Ashraf-3, the PMOI compound near Durrës. Clashes resulted in injuries among residents and police officers. PMOI representatives reported one death, which Albanian authorities disputed was caused by the operation.

=== Musa Khiabani and Ashraf Rabiei ===
On 8 February 1982, Musa Khiabani, a senior PMOI commander in Iran, Ashraf Rabiei, the wife of the organization's leader Massoud Rajavi, and approximately 20 other PMOI members were killed during an armed confrontation with Iranian Revolutionary Guards in Tehran. The incident was a major setback for the organization's leadership inside Iran.

=== Assassination of Kazem Rajavi ===
Kazem Rajavi, a former Iranian diplomat and representative of the National Council of Resistance of Iran in Switzerland, was assassinated near his home in Coppet, Switzerland, on 24 April 1990. Swiss investigators identified several Iranian nationals as suspects and investigated the possible involvement of Iranian intelligence officials. In 2021, the Swiss Federal Criminal Court ruled that the investigation could be pursued under the legal classification of crimes against humanity or genocide, which are not subject to the relevant statute of limitations.

=== Assassination of Mohammad Hossein Naghdi ===
Mohammad Hossein Naghdi, a former chargé d'affaires at the Iranian embassy in Rome who had joined the NCRI after resigning from diplomatic service, was shot and killed in Rome on 16 March 1993. He had become a representative of the Iranian opposition in Italy. Italian judicial proceedings examined the killing, including the possible involvement of Iranian nationals with diplomatic backgrounds.

=== Execution of Ali Saremi ===
Ali Saremi, a PMOI supporter, was executed in Evin Prison in Tehran on 28 December 2010. He had been sentenced to death in December 2009 on charges of "enmity against God" in connection with his alleged membership of the PMOI. Amnesty International expressed concern about the fairness of his trial and reported that his execution took place without prior warning to his family.

=== Executions of Jafar Kazemi and Mohammad Ali Haj Aghaei ===
Jafar Kazemi and Mohammad Mohammad Ali Haj Aghaei were executed in Evin Prison on 24 January 2011. Both had been convicted of "enmity against God" in connection with alleged links to the PMOI and accusations of propaganda against the Iranian government.

=== Execution of Gholamreza Khosravi Savadjani ===
Gholamreza Khosravi Savadjani was executed in Raja'i Shahr Prison on 1 June 2014 after being convicted of "enmity against God" (moharebeh). His case was associated with alleged support for the PMOI, including providing assistance to the organization's television broadcaster.

== See also ==
- Human rights in the Islamic Republic of Iran
