= People's Mojahedin Organization of Iran =

People's Mojahedin Organization سازمان مجاهدین خلق
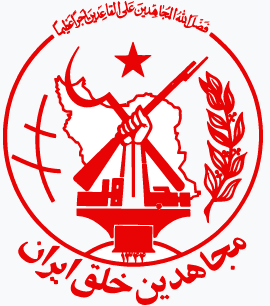
- Abbreviation: PMOI, MEK, MKO
- Leader: Maryam Rajavi; Massoud Rajavi (Note: Since 27 January 1985, they are "Co-equal Leader", but Massoud Rajavi disappeared in 2003 and leadership of the group has de facto passed to his wife Maryam Rajavi.)
- Secretary-General: Mahnaz Maimanat
- Founders: Mohammad Hanifnejad; Saeed Mohsen; Ali-Asghar Badi'zadegan
- Founded: 5 September 1965; 61 years ago
- Banned: 1981 (in Iran)
- Split from: Freedom Movement of Iran
- Headquarters: Camp Ashraf 3, Albania (2018–present); Paris, France (1981–1986; 2003–2018); Camp Liberty, Iraq (2012–2016); Camp Ashraf, Iraq (1986–2013); Tehran, Iran (1965–1981)
- Newspaper: Mojahed
- Political wing: National Council of Resistance of Iran (1981–present)
- Military wing: National Liberation Army of Iran (1987–2003)
- Membership: 5,000 to 10,000 (DoD 2011 est.) (Note: Available estimates of MEK membership in the 2000s are: According to a 2003 article by The New York Times, 5,000 fighters based in Iraq.; In 2011, United States Department of Defense estimated global membership of the organisation between 5,000 and 10,000 members, with 3,400 of them being at Camp Ashraf.; A 2013 article in Foreign Policy claimed that there were some 2,900 members in Iraq.)
- Ideology: See below
- Political position: Syncretic
- Religion: Shia Islam
- Colours: Red

Party flag

Website
- www.mojahedin.org

The People's Mojahedin Organization of Iran (PMOI), also known as Mojahedin-e-Khalq (MEK) or Mojahedin-e-Khalq Organization (MKO; Persian: سازمان مجاهدین خلق ایران, romanised: Sâzmân-e Mojâhedin-e Khalgh-e Irân), (Note: The most common denominations in English sources are People's Mojahedin Organization of Iran (PMOI), Mojahedin-e-Khalq (MEK) and Mojahedin-e-Khalq Organization (MKO). Some sources have used literal translations such as People's Strugglers or People's Holy Warriors. The group had no name until February 1972.) is an Iranian dissident organisation. It was an armed group until 2003, afterwards switching focus into political activity. Its headquarters is currently in Albania. The group's ideology has been historically influenced by Islamic and revolutionary socialist philosophies, particularly through a re-interpretative approach to Shia Islam. After the Iranian Revolution, the MEK opposed the new theocratic Government of Iran, seeking to replace it with its own government. At one point the MEK was Iran's "largest and most active armed dissident group", and it is still sometimes presented by Western political backers as a major Iranian opposition group. The MEK is unpopular today within Iran, largely due to its siding with Iraq in the Iran–Iraq War and continued ties with the government of Saddam Hussein afterwards.

The MEK was founded in 1965 by leftist Iranian students affiliated with the Freedom Movement of Iran to oppose the Shah Mohammad Reza Pahlavi. The organisation contributed to overthrowing the Shah during the 1979 Iranian Revolution. It subsequently pursued the establishment of a democracy in Iran, particularly gaining support from Iran's middle class intelligentsia. The MEK boycotted the 1979 constitutional referendum, which led to Khomeini barring MEK leader Massoud Rajavi from the 1980 presidential election. (Note: Khomeini declared that "those who had failed to endorse the Constitution could not be trusted to abide by that Constitution".) The MEK organised the 20 June 1981 Iranian protests against Khomeini and the ousting of President Abolhassan Banisadr. The protests were violently suppressed by the Islamic Revolutionary Guard Corps, which shot into the crowds, killing 50, before executing 23 further protesters who had been arrested, including teenage girls. On 28 June, the MEK was implicated in the blowing up of the headquarters of the Islamic Republican Party (IRP) in the Haft-e Tir bombing, killing 74 officials and party members. A wave of killings and executions led by Khomeini's government followed, part of the 1981–1982 Iran massacres.

Rajavi fled to Paris and during the exile, the underground network that remained in Iran continued to plan and carry out attacks. It allegedly conducted the August 1981 bombing that killed Iran's president and prime minister. In 1983, the MEK began meeting with Iraqi officials. In 1986, France expelled the MEK at the request of Iran, forcing it to relocate to Camp Ashraf in Iraq. In 1987, it founded the National Liberation Army of Iran (NLA), with the sole objective of "toppling the Islamic Republic through military force from outside the country". During the Iran–Iraq War, the MEK then sided with Iraq, taking part in Operation Forty Stars, and Operation Mersad. Following Operation Mersad, Iranian officials ordered the mass execution of prisoners said to support the MEK. The group gained significant publicity in 2002 by announcing the existence of Iranian nuclear facilities. In 2003, the MEK's military wing signed a ceasefire agreement with the U.S. and was disarmed at Camp Ashraf.

Between 1997 and 2013, the MEK was on the lists of terrorist organisations of the US, Canada, EU, UK and Japan for various periods. The MEK is designated as a terrorist organisation by Iran. Critics have described the group as exhibiting traits of a "personality cult", while its backers describe the group as proponents of "a free and democratic Iran" that could become the next government there.

== History ==
=== Early years (1965–1970) ===
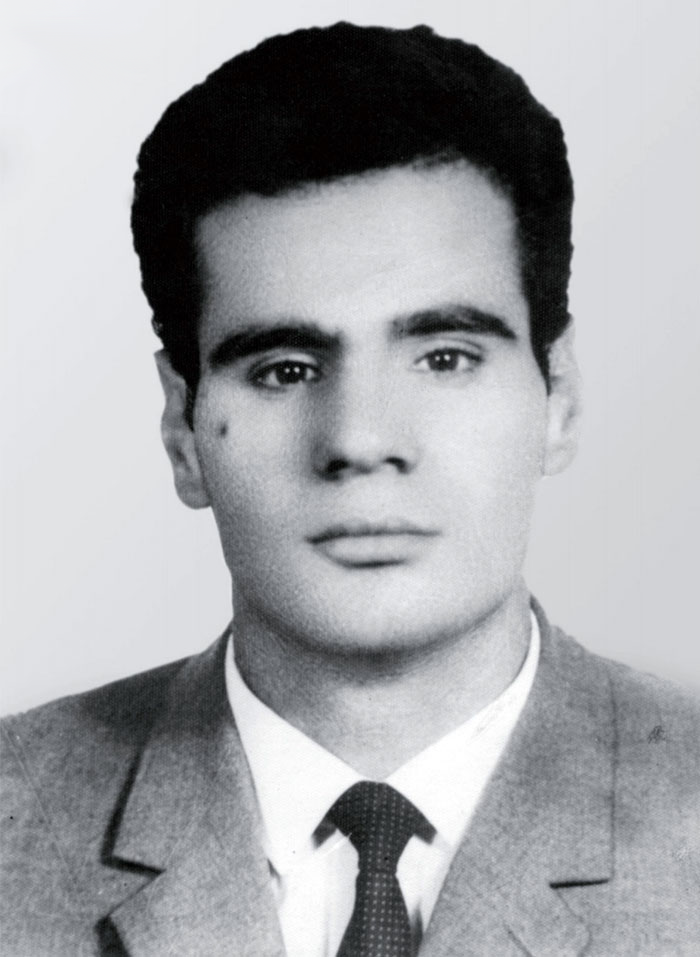
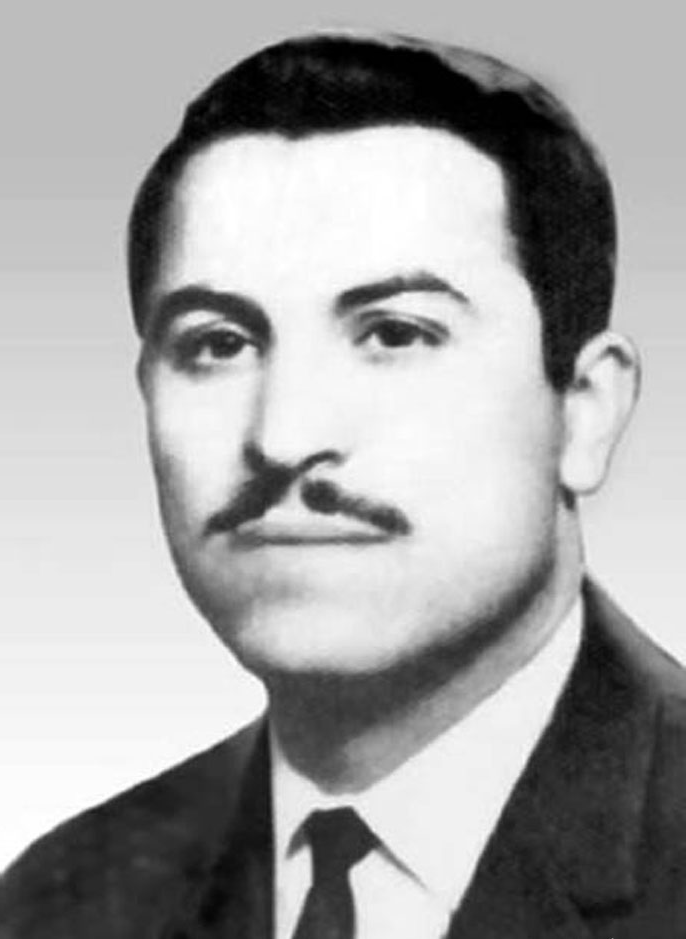
Hanifnejad (left) and Badizadegan (middle) and Mohsen (right), the founders of the organisation

The Mojahedin-e-Khalq (MEK) was founded in 1965 by a group of Tehran University students who had opposed the Shah Mohammad Reza Pahlavi in the 1950s. They considered the mainstream Liberation Movement too moderate and ineffective, and aimed to establish a socialist state in Iran based on a modern and revolutionary interpretation of Islam that originated from Islamic texts like Nahj al-Balagha and some of Ali Shariati's works. MEK founders included Mohammad Hanifnejad, Saeed Mohsen, and Ali Asghar Badiazadegan, and it attracted primarily young, well-educated Iranians. While MEK publications were banned in Iran, in its first five years, the group primarily engaged in ideological work.

=== Schism (1970–1978) ===
MEK's central committee members
1971	1972	1973	1974	1975
Bahram Aram
Reza Rezaei^{a}			Taghi Shahram	
Kazem Zolanvar^{b}		Majid Sharif Vaghefi^{c}		
^{a} Killed in action by SAVAK in 1973^{b} Arrested in 1972, executed in 1975^{c} Killed by Marxist offshoot in 1975 purge

By August 1971, the MEK's Central Committee included Reza Rezai, Kazem Zolanvar, and Bahram Aram. Arrests and executions carried out by the Shah Mohammad Reza Pahlavi's security services between 1971 and 1972, compounded by internal factional infighting, shattered the organisation.

During the 1970s, the MEK opposed the Shah and SAVAK, whom they described as "anti-patriotic, anti-Islamic, and collaborative with Imperialist and anti-popular oppressors".

Between August and September 1971, SAVAK arrested and executed many MEK members including its co-founders. Some surviving members restructured the group by replacing the central cadre with a three-man central committee. Each of the three central committee members led a separate branch of the organisation. Two of the original central committee members were replaced in 1972 and 1973, and the replacing members were in charge of leading the organisation until the internal purge of 1975.

By 1973, MEK members that declared themselves Marxist–Leninist launched an "internal ideological struggle", and by 1975 two opposing MEK factions had formed, one being Muslim and the other Marxist. The Marxist offshoot asserted that "they had reached the conclusion that Marxism, not Islam, was the true revolutionary philosophy". Members who did not convert to Marxism were expelled or reported to SAVAK. This led to two rival Mojahedin, each with its own publication, its own organisation, and its own activities. The Marxist offshoot was initially known as the Mojahedin M.L. (Marxist–Leninist). A few months before the Iranian Revolution, the majority of the Marxist Mojahedin renamed themselves Peykar (Organization of Struggle for the Emancipation of the Working Class) in 1978. From 1973 to 1979, the Muslim MEK including Massoud Rajavi were mainly in prison. "Rajavi, upon release from prison during the revolution, had to rebuild the organization". In May 1972, there was an assassination attempt on Brig. Gen. Harold Price in Tehran, and in 1973 Lt. Col. Louis Lee Hawkins was shot dead in Tehran, though it remains unclear whether the MEK itself or its Marxist offshoot were responsible.

Between 1973 and 1975, the Marxist–Leninist offshoot escalated their militant activities in Iran. In 1973, they engaged in two street battles with Tehran police and bombed ten buildings including Plan Organization, Pan-American Airlines, Shell Oil Company, Hotel International, Radio City Cinema, and an export company owned by a Baháʼí businessman. In February 1974, they attacked a police station in Isfahan and in April, they bombed a reception hall, Oman Bank, gates of the British embassy, and offices of Pan-American Oil company in protest of the Sultan of Oman's state visit. A communiqué by the organisation declared that their actions had been to show solidarity with the people of Dhofar. On 19 April 1974, they attempted to bomb the SAVAK centre at Tehran University. On 25 May, they set off bombs at three multinational corporations. In August 1976, a car carrying three American employees of Rockwell International - William Cottrell, Donald Smith, and Robert Krongard - was attacked, resulting in their deaths. While some sources suggest the MEK was responsible, the Marxist offshoot, which at the time had retained the organisation's name, claimed responsibility for the killings in their "Military Communique No.24", concluding that the murders were in retaliation for recent death sentences.

=== 1979 Iranian Revolution and subsequent power struggles ===
The MEK supported the revolution in its initial phases, and became "a major force in Iranian politics" according to Ervand Abrahamian. However, it soon entered into conflict with Khomeini, and became a leading opposition to the new theocratic regime. By early 1979, the MEK had organised itself and recreated armed cells, especially in Tehran and helped overthrow the Pahlavi regime. In January 1979, Massoud Rajavi was released from prison and rebuilt the MEK together with other members that had been imprisoned. Also in January 1979 the MEK released a programme advocating for increased rights for ethnic minorities in Iran, the introduction of welfare-state policies, and gender equality; while the Khomeini regime perceived these demands as a threat.

Its candidate for the head of the newly founded Council of Experts was Massoud Rajavi in the referendum of August 1979. He was not elected. The MEK further launched an unsuccessful campaign supporting the total abolition of Iran's standing military, the Islamic Republic of Iran Army, in order to prevent a coup d'état against the system. They also claimed credit for infiltration against the Nojeh coup plot. The MEK was one of the supporters of the occupation of the American embassy in Tehran after the Iranian revolution, although MEK has denied this.

The MEK refused to participate in the December 1979 Iranian constitutional referendum organised by the Islamic Republican Party to ratify the Constitution drafted by the Assembly of Experts, arguing that the new constitution had failed in many aspects "most important of all, accept the concept of the 'classless tawhidi society'". Despite the opposition, the 3 December 1979 referendum vote approved the new constitution. Once the constitution had been ratified, the MEK proposed Rajavi as their presidential candidate. In his campaign, Rajavi promised to rectify the constitution's shortcomings. The conflict surrounding the Constitution intensified when the Assembly of Experts added numerous clauses that transferred sovereignty from the Iranian population to the ulama, shifting the power to senior clerics and away from the president and elected representatives. In the years that followed, the clerics strengthened their grip on the republic, eventually gaining control over all branches of government and fully establishing a theocratic state. As a result of the boycott, Khomeini subsequently refused to allow Massoud Rajavi and MEK members to run in the 1980 Iranian presidential election. Khomeini declared that "those who had failed to endorse the Constitution could not be trusted to abide by that Constitution". In the March and April 1980 parliamentary elections, the MEK secured the second-highest number of votes. Massoud Rajavi garnered 500,000 votes, while his wife Maryam received over 250,000. However, Khomeini restricted both of them from entering the parliament (Majles). Rajavi then allied with Iran's new president, Abolhassan Banisadr, elected in January 1980.

=== Cultural revolution, Iranian protests, and subsequent oppression (1980–1981) ===
On June 14, 1980, Ayatollah Khomeini initiated an order aimed to "purify" higher education by removing Western, liberal, and leftist elements, leading to the closure of universities, the banning of student unions, and violent occupations of campuses. Following the 1979 revolution, the MEK started to gain popularity among university students. During the Cultural Revolution in Iran, clerics imposed policies to Islamise Iranian society, including the expulsion of critical academics, the suppression of secular political groups, and the persecution of intellectuals and artists. These measures sparked large-scale protests across the country.

On the final day of the elections, Rajavi met with President Abolhassan Banisadr, complaining that the IRP and its Hezbollah supporters were systematically intimidating voters, disrupting rallies, assaulting campaign workers, and setting ballot boxes on fire. The MEK then arrived at two key conclusions: first, that they had enough popular backing to serve as an opposition to the IRP; and second, that the IRP would not allow them to operate as an opposition. The group began clashing with the ruling Islamic Republican Party while avoiding direct and open criticism of Khomeini. The MEK was in turn suppressed by Khomeini's revolutionary organisations.

In response to the widely disputed impeachment of President Banisadr, the MEK organised a large-scale protest against Khomeini on June 20, 1981, intending to topple the regime. Big crowds gathered in various cities, with the Tehran protest alone attracting up to 500,000 people. Leading clerics proclaimed that demonstrators would be considered "enemies of God" and face immediate execution regardless of age. This marked the beginning of the 1981–1982 Iran Massacres led by the Islamic government. In the area around Tehran University, 50 people were killed, 200 wounded, and 1,000 taken into custody, surpassing the intensity of most street battles during the Islamic Revolution. 23 demonstrators were also executed by firing squads, with teenage girls among those executed. From June 24 to 27, the regime executed an additional 50 people. The reported number of executions increased to "600 by September, 1700 by October, and 2500 by December." Initially, the regime publicly displayed the bodies and took pride in declaring the execution of entire families, "including teenage daughters and 60-year-old grandmothers." The MEK responded by declaring war against the Government of Islamic Republic of Iran, and initiating a series of bombings and assassinations targeting the clerical leadership.

In September 1980 during Iraq's invasion of Iran, the MEK stepped up to fight for their country despite its strained relationship with Khomeini's government. Thousands of MEK members joined the front lines.

==== Hafte Tir bombing ====
On 28 June 1981, the Islamic Republican Party headquarters was bombed in the Hafte Tir bombing, which killed 74 party officials and other party members, including Mohammad Beheshti, the party's secretary-general and Chief Justice of Iran, 4 cabinet ministers, 10 vice ministers and 27 members of the Parliament of Iran. Iranian officials initially blamed various groups including the Iraqi government, SAVAK, and the United States. Two days after the incident Ruhollah Khomeini accused the MEK. In the years that followed, others were also held accountable, including a man named Mehdi Tafari executed by a Tehran tribunal for his alleged involvement. Kenneth Katzman notes there is much speculation among academics and observers that the bombings could have been orchestrated by top IRP officials as a strategy to eliminate political opponents within the government. According to the United States Department of State, in addition to other sources, the bombing was carried out by the MEK. Ervand Abrahamian argues that whatever the truth may be, the Islamic Republic used this incident to fight the MEK. The MEK declared that the bombing was a "natural and necessary reaction to the regime's atrocities", and it never claimed responsibility for the attack.

==== Open conflict with the Islamic Republican Party ====
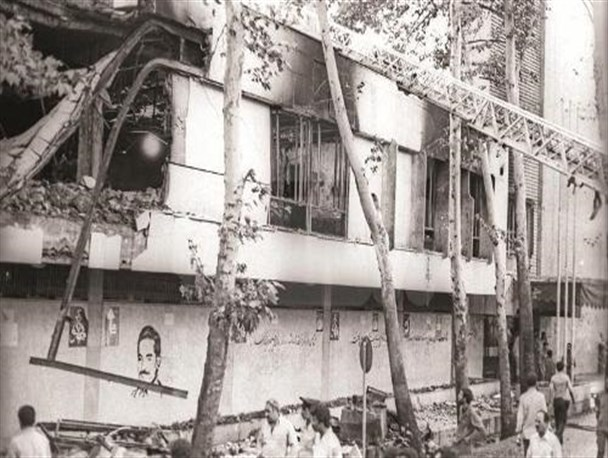
Bomb debris after assassination of President Mohammad-Ali Rajaei and Prime Minister Mohammad-Javad Bahonar in 1981

While Khomeini and the MEK had allied against the Shah, Khomeini "disliked the MEK's philosophy, which combined Marxist theories of social evolution and class struggle with a view of Shiite Islam that suggested Shiite clerics had misinterpreted Islam and had been collaborators with the ruling class", and by mid-1980, clerics close to Khomeini were openly referring to the MEK as "monafeghin", "kafer", and "elteqatigari". The MEK in turn accused Khomeini and the clerics of "monopolizing power", "hijacking the revolution", "trampling over democratic rights", and "plotting to set up a fascistic one-party dictatorship".

In July 1981, the MEK then formed the National Council of Resistance of Iran (NCRI) with the stated goal of uniting the opposition to the Iranian government under one umbrella organisation. Rajavi assumed the position of chairman of the organisation. On 30 August 1981, they bombed the Prime Minister's office, killing the elected President Rajai and Premier Mohammad Javad Bahonar. Iranian authorities announced that Massoud Keshmiri, an MEK member was probably responsible. The reaction to the Hafte Tir bombing and the bombing of the Prime Minister's office was intense, with many arrests and executions of Mojahedin. The MEK responded by targeting key Iranian official figures for assassination, as well as attacking low-ranking civil servants and members of the Revolutionary Guards, along with ordinary citizens who supported the new government.

Between June 1981 and April 1982, around 3,500 MEK members were either executed or killed by the Islamic Revolutionary Guard Corps. Another 5000 MEK prisoners were detained in camps, and another 8,000 were imprisoned for charges such as possessing copies of Mujahid newspaper. During the same period the MEK was responsible for about 65 percent of nearly 1,000 Khomeini officials killed. From 26 August 1981 to December 1982, the MEK orchestrated 336 attacks against Khomeini officials. In July 1982, 13 IRGC members and Mohammad Sadoughi were killed by MEK members.

=== Exile and underground opposition activity (1982–1988) ===
In 1982, the Islamic Republic cracked down MEK operations within Iran. On 8 February, Mousa Khiabani, Rajavi's deputy and the MEK's field commander in Iran was killed following a three-hour gunfight at a North Tehran safehouse. Other fatalities were his wife Azar Rezaei, Ashraf Rabiei, Rajavi's first wife and six others. Rajavi's son Mostafa survived and was later sent to Paris. The MEK stressed the significance of ideology, which was shaped by its interpretation of what was missing in Iran at the time such as lack of freedom and human rights limitations by the Islamic Republic. The majority of the MEK leadership and members fled to France, where it operated until 1985. In 1983, the MEK started an alliance with Iraq following a meeting between Massoud Rajavi and Tariq Aziz. Iran's deposed president Abolhassan Banisadr ended his alliance with the group in 1984, denouncing its stance during the Iran–Iraq War.

In 1986, after French Prime Minister Jacques Chirac struck a deal with Tehran for the release of French hostages held prisoners by the Hezbollah in Lebanon. Also in June 1986, the Islamic Republic "won another major victory in its campaign to isolate the Mojahedin" by persuading the French government to close down the MEK headquarters in Paris. This improved relations between France and Iran. During this period other European nations declined to offer political asylum to the group. With no alternative available and a desire to maintain the group's cohesion, they ultimately decided to relocate to Iraq. James Piazza contends that the MEK's expulsion from France and relocation to Iraq is a "crucial episode" in the group's exile, as it appears Khomeini aimed to send the MEK to a remote place. However, the group ended up in a location that enabled it to continue its cross-border attacks. MEK representatives contend that their organisation had little alternative to moving to Iraq considering its aim of toppling the Iranian clerical government. By 1987, most MEK leaders were based in Iraq, where the group remained until the 2003 US invasion. According to the US State Department, the MEK was mainly supported by Iraq during that period and was fighting on the Iraqi side in the 1980–1988 Iran–Iraq War.

From 1982 to 1988, despite the mounting casualties on both sides, the lingering underground presence of the MEK in Iran remained operational and went on to perform an average of sixty operations per week, resulting in assassinations of important Khomeini deputies. The MEK came to be considered Iran's "largest and most active Iranian exile organization", and its publications were commonly circulated within the Iranian diaspora.

==== Operations Shining Sun, Forty Stars, and Eternal Light ====
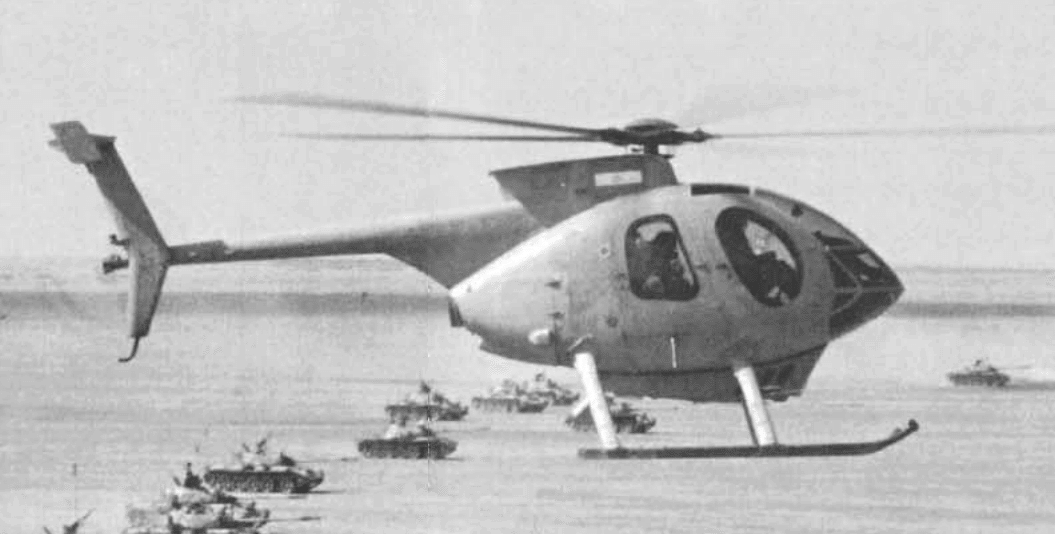
National Liberation Army of Iran MD-500

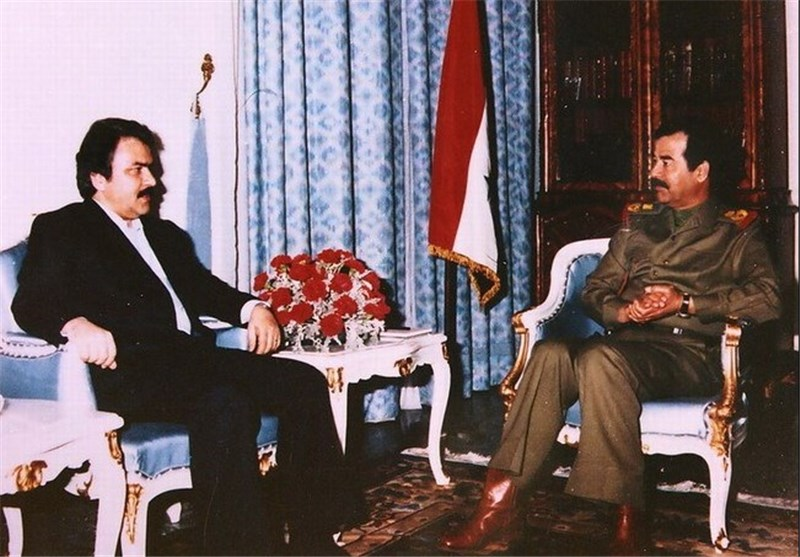
MEK leader Massoud Rajavi with Iraqi president Saddam Hussein.

The MEK's official argument for moving to Iraq was that it would place them geographically close to their enemy, the Islamic Republic government in Iran. In 1987 Masoud Rajavi declared the establishment of the National Liberation Army of Iran (Persian: ارتش آزادیبخش ملی ایران, romanised: Arteš-e Âzâdibaxš-e Melli-e Irân, NLA). It served as an infantry force that included different militant groups and members of the NCRI. its sole objective was to "overthrow the Islamic Republic using a military force outside the country." Through a broadcast on Baghdad radio, the MEK extended an invitation to all progressive-nationalist Iranian individuals to join the NLA in overthrowing the government of the Islamic Republic.

On 27 March 1988, the NLA launched its first military offensive against the Islamic Republic's armed forces. The NLA captured 600 square-kilometres of Islamic Republic territory and 508 soldiers from the Iranian 77th infantry division in Khuzestan Province. The operation was named "Shining Sun" (or "Operation Bright Sun") in which according to Massoud Rajavi, 2000 soldiers of the Islamic Republic were killed and $100 million worth of equipment was captured and exhibited for journalists.

Operation Forty Stars was launched on June 18, 1988. With 530 aircraft sorties and heavy use of nerve gas, they attacked to the Iranian forces in the area around Mehran, killing or wounding 3,500 and nearly destroying a Revolutionary Guard division. The forces captured the city and took positions in the heights near Mehran, coming close to wiping out the whole Iranian Pasdaran division and taking most of its equipment. While some sources claim that Iraq participated in the operation, the MEK and Baghdad said Iraqi soldiers did not take part.

Near the end of the Iran–Iraq War, a military force of 7,000 members of the MEK, armed and equipped by Saddam's Iraq and calling itself the National Liberation Army of Iran (NLA) was founded. On 26 July 1988, six days after Ayatollah Khomeini had announced his acceptance of the UN-brokered ceasefire resolution, the NLA advanced under heavy Iraqi air cover, crossing the Iranian border from Iraq. It seized the Iranian town of Islamabad-e Gharb. As it advanced further into Iran, Iraq ceased its air support, with Iranian forces cutting off NLA supply lines and counterattacking under cover of fighter planes and helicopter gunships. The MEK claims it lost 1,400 dead or missing and the Islamic Republic sustained 55,000 casualties. Iran claimed to have killed 4,500 NLA during the operation. The operation was called Foroughe Javidan (Eternal Light) by the MEK and the counterattack Operation Mersad by the Iranian forces. Rajavi later stated that "the failure of Eternal Light was not a military blunder, but was instead rooted in the members' thoughts for their spouses".

==== 1988 execution of MEK prisoners ====
Following the MEK's Operation Mersad against Iranian forces, thousands of imprisoned members of the MEK, along with members of other leftist opposition groups, were executed. The Iranian government used the MEK's failed invasion as a pretext for the mass execution of those "who remained steadfast in their support for the MEK" and other jailed opposition group members. Most of the prisoners executed were there for nonviolent activities like distributing newspapers and leaflets, joining protests, or raising money for the opposition. Some were imprisoned for holding outlawed political views.

On 19 July 1988, the authorities isolated major prisons, having its courts of law go on an unscheduled holiday to prevent relatives from inquiring about those imprisoned, and as Ervand Abrahamian notes, "thus began an act of violence unprecedented in Iranian history". Prisoners were asked if they were willing to denounce the MEK before cameras, help the IRI hunt down MEK members and name secret sympathisers. Those who gave unsatisfactory answers were promptly taken away and hanged. Some women and youths were among those executed. Human rights groups say that the number of those executed remains uncertain, but "thousands of political dissidents were systematically subjected to enforced disappearance in Iranian detention facilities across the country", with those executed charged with "moharebeh" or "waging war on God", and of "disclosing state secrets" and threatening national security". Since the executions, Amnesty International has stated that "there has also been an ongoing campaign by the Islamic Republic to demonize victims, distort facts, and repress family survivors and human rights defenders." Under international law, these mass extrajudicial killings without fair proceedings were also considered systematic crimes against humanity.

The executions were ordered directly by Ayatollah Khomeini through a written fatwa. The killings were implemented by "death committees," composed of an Islamic judge, a representative of the Ministry of Intelligence, and a state prosecutor. High-ranking officials, such as Mohammad Khatami and Ayatollah Ali Khamenei, were identified by opposition groups as responsible.

According to Professor Cheryl Bernard, the mass execution of political prisoners carried out by the Islamic Republic in 1981 caused the MEK to split into four groups: those that were arrested, imprisoned or executed, a group that went underground in Iran, another that left to Kurdistan and a final group that left to other countries abroad. By the end of 1981, the principal refuge for many exiled members of the MEK had become France.

=== Post-war Saddam era (1988–2003) ===
The Iranian government is believed to be concerned about MEK activities in Iran. As such, MEK supporters are a major target of Iran's internal security apparatus abroad and it is said to be responsible for killing MEK members, Kazem Rajavi on 24 April 1990 and Mohammad-Hossein Naghdi, a NCRI representative on 6 March 1993. In 1991 the MEK was accused of helping the Iraqi Republican Guard suppress Shiite and Kurdish nationwide uprisings, a claim the MEK has consistently denied. Ervand Abrahamian suggests that one motivation for the MEK's opposition to the clerical regime was its infringement on the rights of national minorities, especially the Kurds.

In April 1992, the MEK attacked 10 Iranian embassies, including the Iranian Mission to the United Nations in New York using different weapons, taking hostages, and injuring Iranian ambassadors and embassy employees. There were dozens of arrests. According to MEK representatives, the attacks were a way to protest the bombing of a MEK military base where several people had been killed and wounded.

In June 1998 FIFA president Sepp Blatter said that he received "anonymous threats of disruption from Iranian exiles" for the 1998 FIFA World Cup match between Iran and the U.S. football teams at Stade de Gerland. The MEK bought some 7,000 out of 42,000 tickets for the match between, in order to promote themselves with the political banners they smuggled. The plan was ultimately foiled with TV cameras avoiding filming them, and intelligence sources having been tipped off about a potential pitch invasion. To prevent an interruption in the match, extra security entered Stade Gerland.

In 1999, after a 2 1/2-year investigation, Federal authorities arrested 29 individuals in Operation Eastern Approach, of whom 15 were held on charges of helping MEK members illegally enter the United States. The ringleader pled guilty to providing fake documents to MEK members and to violations of the Antiterrorism and Effective Death Penalty Act of 1996. In 2002 the NCRI publicly called for the formation of a National Solidarity Front to help overthrow the Iranian Government.

==== 2003 French arrests ====
In June 2003, French police raided the MEK's properties, including its base in Auvers-sur-Oise, under the orders of anti-terrorist magistrate Jean-Louis Bruguière, after suspicions that it was trying to shift its base of operations there. 160 suspected MEK members were then arrested, including Maryam Rajavi and her brother Saleh Rajavi. After questioning, most of those detained were released, but 24 members, including Maryam Rajavi, were kept in detention.

In response, 40 supporters began hunger strikes to protest the arrests, and 10 members including Neda Hassani, immolated themselves in various European capitals. French Interior Minister Nicolas Sarkozy declared that the MEK "recently wanted to make France its support base, notably after the intervention in Iraq", while Pierre de Bousquet de Florian, head of France's domestic intelligence service, claimed that the group was "transforming its Val d'Oise centre [near Paris] [...] into an international terrorist base". Police found $1.3 million in $100 bills in cash in their offices.

U.S. Senator Sam Brownback, a Republican from Kansas and chairman of the Foreign Relations subcommittee on South Asia, then accused the French of doing "the Iranian government's dirty work". Along with other members of Congress, he wrote a letter of protest to President Jacques Chirac, while longtime MEK supporters such as Sheila Jackson Lee, a Democrat from Texas, criticised Maryam Radjavi's arrest. A court later found that there were no grounds for terrorism or terrorism-related finance charges. In 2014, prosecuting judges also dropped all charges of money laundering and fraud.

=== Post-U.S. invasion of Iraq (2003–2016) ===
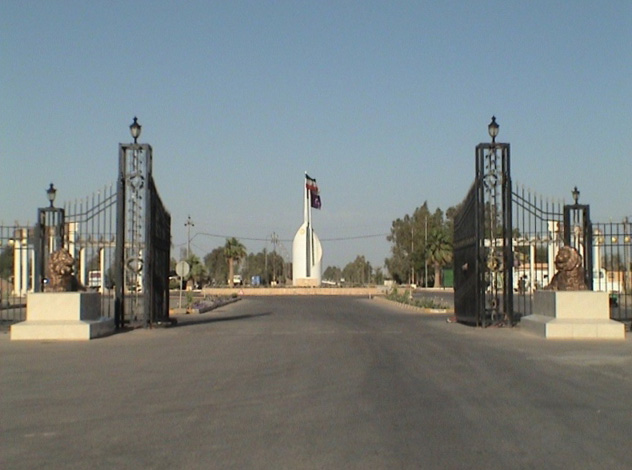
Entrance Gate of Ashraf City when populated by PMOI exiles

In May 2003, during the Iraq War, the Coalition forces bombed MEK bases and forced them to surrender. This resulted in at least 50 deaths. (Note: It was later revealed that the U.S. bombings were part of an agreement between the Iranian government and Washington.) The US forces then disarmed Camp Ashraf residents. In the operation, the U.S. reportedly captured 6,000 MEK soldiers and over 2,000 pieces of military equipment, including 19 British-made Chieftain tanks. Following the occupation the U.S. did not hand over MEK fighters to Iran. The group's core members were for many years effectively confined to Camp Ashraf, before later being relocated to a former U.S. military base, Camp Liberty, in Iraq. Then-Secretary of Defense Donald Rumsfeld and Vice President Dick Cheney argued that the MEK should be used against Iran. They were then placed under the guard of the U.S. Military. Defectors from the MEK requested assistance from the Coalition forces, who created a "temporary internment and protection facility" for them. In the first year these numbered "several hundred", mainly Iranian soldiers captured in the Iran–Iraq War and other Iranians lured to the MEK. In all, during the period of US control, nearly 600 members of the MEK defected.

In June 2004, Donald Rumsfeld designated the MeK as protected persons under the Fourth Geneva Convention. and signed a formal ceasefire agreement. Since 2009, when the Iraqi government became openly hostile to MEK, the U.S. led efforts to get the group's members out of Iraq. After it was no longer designated as a terrorist group, the US was able to convince Albania to accept the remaining 2,700 members who were brought to Tirana between 2014 and 2016.

Separate from events in Iraq, the organisation launched a free-to-air satellite television network named Vision of Freedom (Sima-ye-Azadi) in England in 2003. It previously operated Vision of Resistance analogue television in Iraq in the 1990s, accessible in western provinces of Iran. They also had a radio station, Radio Iran Zamin, that was closed down in June 1998. In 2006, an EU freeze on the group's funds was overturned by the European Court of First Instance. In 2010 and 2011 Ali Saremi, Mohammad Ali Haj Aghaei and Jafar Kazemi were executed by the Iranian government for co-operating with the MEK.

==== Iraqi government crackdown (2009–2013) ====
In 2009 American troops gave the Iraqi government responsibility of the MEK. Iraqi authorities, which were sympathetic to Iran, allowed Iran-linked militias to attack the MEK. Prime Minister Nuri al-Maliki announced that the group would not be allowed to base its operations from Iraqi soil. On 23 January 2009, while on a visit to Tehran, Iraqi National Security Advisor Mowaffak al-Rubaie reiterated the Iraqi Prime Minister's earlier announcement that the MEK organisation would no longer be able to base itself on Iraqi soil and stated that the members of the organisation would have to make a choice, either to go back to Iran or to go to a third country, adding that these measures would be implemented over the next two months.

On 28 July 2009, Iraqi security forces raided MEK headquarters at Camp Ashraf. MEK claimed 11 dead and 400 injured in clashes while the Iraqi government claimed 30 policemen injured. U.S. officials had long opposed a violent takeover of the camp northeast of Baghdad, and the raid is thought to symbolise the declining American influence in Iraq. After the raid, the U.S. Secretary of State, Hillary Rodham Clinton, stated the issue was "completely within [the Iraqi government's] purview". In the course of the attack, 36 Iranian dissidents were arrested and removed from the camp to a prison in a town named Khalis, where the arrestees went on hunger strike for 72 days. Finally, the dissidents were released when they were in an extremely critical condition and on the verge of death.

In January 2010, Iranian authorities charged five MEK protesters of "rioting and arson" under the crime of moharebeh, an offence reserved for those who "take up arms against the state" and carries the death penalty. In July 2010, the Supreme Iraqi Criminal Tribunal issued an arrest warrant for 39 MEK members, including Massoud and Maryam Rajavi, accusing them of crimes against humanity during the 1991 uprisings in Iraq. The MEK denied the charges.

In 2012, the MEK moved from Camp Ashraf to Camp Hurriya in Baghdad (a onetime U.S. base formerly known as Camp Liberty). A rocket and mortar attack killed 5 and injured 50 others at Camp Hurriya on 9 February 2013. MEK residents of the facility and their representatives appealed to the UN Secretary-General and U.S. officials to let them return to Ashraf, which they said has concrete buildings and shelters that offer more protection. The United States has been working with the UN High Commissioner for Refugees on the resettlement project.

In 2013, 52 unarmed MEK members were killed during an attack on Camp Ashraf. 7 other members were also reported missing. Iraqi security forces are thought to be responsible for the assault, with guidance and support from the Iranian government.

==== Iran's nuclear programme ====
The MEK and the NCRI revealed the existence of Iran's nuclear programme in a press conference held on 14 August 2002 in Washington, D.C. MEK representative Alireza Jafarzadeh stated that Iran is running two top-secret projects, one in the city of Natanz and another in a facility located in Arak, which was later confirmed by the International Atomic Energy Agency.

Journalists Seymour Hersh and Connie Bruck have written that the information was given to the MEK by Israel. Among others, it was described by a senior IAEA official and a monarchist advisor to Reza Pahlavi, who said before MEK they were offered to reveal the information, but they refused because it would be seen negatively by the people of Iran. Similar accounts could be found elsewhere by others, including comments made by US officials.

On 18 November 2004, MEK representative Mohammad Mohaddessin used satellite images to state that a new facility existed in northeast Tehran named "Center for the Development of Advanced Defence Technology". This allegation by MEK and all their subsequent allegations were false.

In 2010 the NCRI claimed to have uncovered a secret nuclear facility in Iran. These claims were dismissed by U.S. officials, who did not believe the facilities to be nuclear. In 2013, the NCRI again claimed to have discovered a secret underground nuclear site.

In 2012, NBC News' Richard Engel and Robert Windrem published a report quoting U.S. officials, who spoke to NBC News on condition of anonymity, that the MEK was being "financed, trained, and armed by Israel's secret service" to assassinate Iranian nuclear scientists. A senior U.S. State Department official said the Department never claimed that the MEK was involved in the assassinations of Iranian nuclear scientists. Former CIA case officer in the Middle East, Robert Baer said that the perpetrators "could only be Israel", and that "it is quite likely Israel is acting in tandem with" the MEK.

On 27 November 2020, Iran's top nuclear scientist Mohsen Fakhrizadeh was assassinated. Iranian Rear Admiral Ali Shamkhani, who heads the Supreme National Security Council, blamed Mujahideen-e-Khalq and Israel.

=== Settlement in Albania (2016–present) ===
In 2016, the United States brokered a deal to relocate the MEK to Albania. About 3,000 members moved to Albania, and the U.S. donated $20 million to the U.N. refugee agency to help them resettle. On 9 September 2016, more than 280 remaining MEK members were relocated to Albania. Camp Ashraf 3 is located in Manëz, Durrës County, where they have been protested by the locals. While the level of support for the MEK in Iran remains unclear, Iranian state media reported in July 2026 that a number of people linked to the group had been executed.

==== Relationship during Trump presidency ====
In 2017, the year before John Bolton became President Trump's National Security Adviser, Bolton addressed members of the MEK and said that they would celebrate in Tehran before 2019. By 2018, operatives of the MEK were believed to be still conducting covert operations inside Iran to overthrow Iran's government. It also maintained some operations in France, and in January 2018, Iranian President Hassan Rouhani phoned French president Emmanuel Macron, asking him to order kicking the MEK out of its base in Auvers-sur-Oise, alleging that the MEK stirred up the 2017–18 Iranian protests. By 2018, over 4,000 MEK members had entered Albania, according to the INSTAT data.

On 30 June 2018, Rudy Giuliani, Donald Trump's personal lawyer, lectured an MEK gathering in Paris, calling for regime change in Tehran. John McCain and John Bolton have met the MEK's leader Maryam Rajavi or spoken at its rallies.

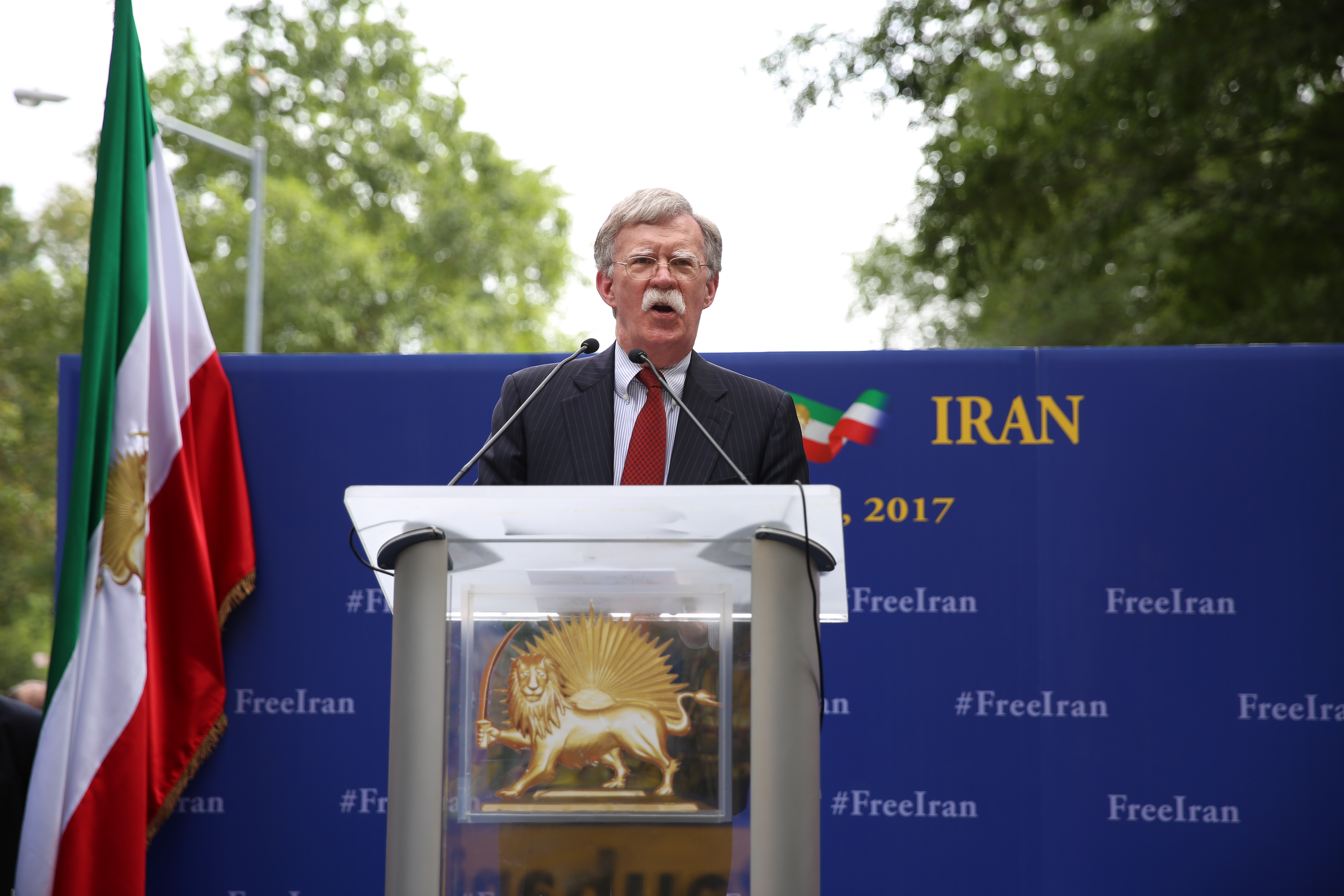
John Bolton speaking at a MEK event

During the Free Iran 2019 conference in Albania, former New York City mayor Rudy Giuliani attended an MEK podium, where he described the group as a "government-in-exile", saying it is a ready-to-go alternative to lead the country if the Iranian government falls. Additionally, the Trump administration said it would not rule out the MEK as a viable replacement for the current Iranian regime.

==== Islamic Republic of Iran operations against MEK inside Europe ====
On 30 June 2018 Belgian police arrested a married couple of Iranian heritage Amir Saadouni and Nasimeh Naami on charges of "attempted terrorist murder and preparing a terrorist act" against an MEK rally in France. The couple had in their possession half of a kilogram of TATP explosives and a detonator. Police also detained Asadollah Asadi, an Iranian diplomat in Vienna. German prosecutors charged Asadi with "activity as foreign agent and conspiracy to commit murder by contacting the couple and giving them a device containing 500 grams of TATP". Prosecutors said Asadi was a member of the Iranian Ministry of Intelligence and Security service, an organisation that focuses on "combating of opposition groups inside and outside of Iran". Iran responded that the arrests were a "false flag ploy", with the Iranian Foreign Ministry spokesman saying the "two suspects in Belgium were in fact members of the People's Mujahideen". In October 2018, the French government officially and publicly blamed Iran's Intelligence Service for the failed attack against the MEK. U.S. officials also condemned Iran over the foiled bomb plot that France blames on Tehran. In December 2018, Albania expelled two Iranian diplomats due to alleged involvement in the bomb plot against the MEK (where Mayor Giuliani and other US government officials were also gathered) accusing the two of "violating their diplomatic status". Iranian President Hassan Rouhani said that the MEK incited violence during the 2017–2018 Iranian protests.

In October 2019, Albanian police discovered an Iranian paramilitary network that allegedly planned attacks against MEK members in Albania. Albania's police chief, Ardi Veliu, said that the Iran Revolutionary Guard's foreign wing operated an "active terrorist cell" that targeted members of the MEK. A police statement said that two Iranian security officials led the network from Tehran, and that it was allegedly linked to organised crime groups in Turkey. It also said that the network used a former MEK member to collect information in Albania. Valiu also said that a planned attack on the MEK by Iranian government agents was foiled in March.

In 2020, newspaper De Standaard said evidence that Iranian intelligence and security was involved in the failed 2018 bomb plot against an MEK rally was mounting. In a note to the federal prosecutor's office, the State Security writes that "the attack was devised in the name and under the impetus of Iran", with the note also describing one of the case's suspects, Asadollah Asadi, as a MOIS agent. Amir Saadouni and Nasimeh Naami, who in 2018 were found with half a kilo of explosives and are also being charged in the case, admitted that they had been in contact with Asadollah Asadi. In October 2020, the Iranian diplomat Asadollah Asadi charged in Belgium with planning to bomb a rally by the MEK "warned authorities of possible retaliation by unidentified groups if he is found guilty". Asadi would become the first Iranian diplomat to go on trial on charges of terrorism within the European Union. In February 2021, Asadi and his accomplices were found guilty of attempted terrorism and Asadi was sentenced to 20 years in prison.

In September 2022, Albania suffered a second cyber-attack, resulting in it cutting diplomatic ties with the Islamic Republic and ordering Iranian embassy staff to leave. According to the FBI and CISA, the cyberattacks were motivated by Albania's hosting of the MEK.

In 2023, Deputy Minister of International Affairs of the Judiciary Kazem Gharibabadi opened a case against 107 members of the MEK for treason, calling the organisation "a terrorist group whose hands are stained with the blood of thousands of Iranians".

== Ideology ==
=== Before the revolution ===
In the 1960s the MEK created a series of pamphlets designed to outline their worldviews. Their work "The Portrait of a Muslim" is thought to be the "first book in Persian" to systematically interpret "early Shiism as a protest movement against class exploitation and state oppression." The group's early ideology asserted that science, reason, and modernity were compatible with Islam. They adopted the concept of class struggle from Karl Marx but rejected being labeled as Marxists or socialists as they believed in the spiritual dimension of human beings, a concept incompatible with Marxist philosophy. During this period, the MEK's ideology embraced class struggle and historical determinism but rejected the denial of God.

According to Katzman, the MEK's early ideology is a matter of dispute. While scholars generally describe the MEK's ideology as an attempt to combine "Islam with revolutionary Marxism", today the organisation claims that it has always emphasised Islam, and that Marxism and Islam are incompatible. Despite their Marxist influence, the group never used the terms "socialist" or "communist" to describe themselves. Katzman writes that their ideology "espoused the creation of a classless society that would combat world imperialism, international Zionism, colonialism, exploitation, racism, and multinational corporations". The MEK's ideological foundation was developed during the period of the Iran revolution. According to its official history, the MEK first defined itself as a group that wanted to establish a nationalist, democratic, revolutionary Muslim organisation in favour of change in Iran.

Historian Ervand Abrahamian observed that the MEK were "consciously influenced by Marxism, both modern and classical", but they always denied being Marxists because they were aware that the term was colloquial to 'atheistic materialism' among Iran's general public. The Iranian regime for the same reason was "eager to pin on the Mojahedin the labels of Islamic-Marxists and Marxist-Muslims".

According to Abrahamian, it was the first Iranian organisation to develop systematically a modern revolutionary interpretation of Islam that "differed sharply from both the old conservative Islam of the traditional clergy and the new populist version formulated in the 1970s by Ayatollah Khomeini and his disciples". Abrahamian said that the MEK's early ideology constituted a "combination of Muslim themes; Shii notions of martyrdom; classical Marxist theories of class struggle and historical determinism; and neo-Marxist concepts of armed struggle, guerilla warfare and revolutionary heroism". According to James Piazza, the MEK worked towards the creation by armed popular struggle of a society in which ethnic, gender, or class discrimination would be obliterated.

Nasser Sadegh told military tribunals that although the MEK respected Marxism as a "progressive method of social analysis, they could not accept materialism, which was contrary to their Islamic ideology". The MEK eventually had a falling out with Marxist groups. According to Sepehr Zabir, "they soon became Enemy No. 1 of both pro-Soviet Marxist groups, the Tudeh and the Majority Fedayeen."

The MEK's ideology of revolutionary Shi'ism is based on an interpretation of Islam so similar to that of Ali Shariati that "many concluded" they were inspired by him. According to Ervand Abrahamian, it is clear that "in later years" that Shariati and "his prolific works" had "indirectly helped the Mujahedin".

In the group's "first major ideological work", Nahzat-i Husseini or Hussein's Movement, authored by one of the group's founders, Ahmad Reza'i, it was argued that Nezam-i Towhid (monotheistic order) sought by the prophet Muhammad, was a commonwealth fully united not only in its worship of one God but in a classless society that strives for the common good. "Shiism, particularly Hussein's historic act of martyrdom and resistance, has both a revolutionary message and a special place in our popular culture."

As described by Abrahamian, one Mojahedin ideologist argued:

Reza'i further argued that the banner of revolt raised by the Shi'i Imams, especially Ali, Hassan, and Hussein, was aimed against feudal landlords and exploiting merchant capitalists as well as against usurping Caliphs who betrayed the Nezam-i-Towhid. For Reza'i and the Mujahidin it was the duty of all Muslims to continue this struggle to create a 'classless society' and destroy all forms of capitalism, despotism, and imperialism. The Mojahedin summed up their attitude towards religion in these words: 'After years of extensive study into Islamic history and Shi'i ideology, our organization has reached the firm conclusion that Islam, especially Shi'ism, will play a major role in inspiring the masses to join the revolution. It will do so because Shi'ism, particularly Hussein's historic act of resistance, has both a revolutionary message and a special place in our popular culture.

=== After the revolution ===
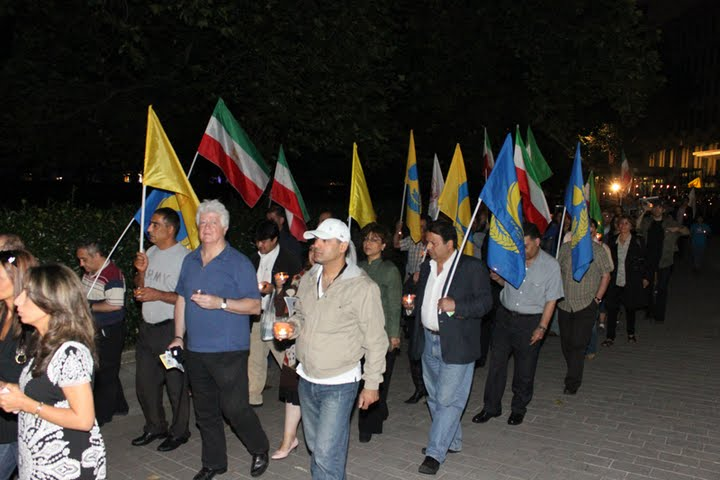
MEK demonstrators carrying Lion and Sun flags and those of 'National Liberation Army of Iran'.

Massoud Rajavi supported the idea that Shi'ism is compatible with pluralistic democracy. In 1981, after signing the "covenant of freedom and independence" with Banisadr, and establishing NCRI Massoud Rajavi made an announcement to the foreign press about the MEK's ideology saying that "First we want freedom for all political parties. We reject both political prisoners and political executions. In the true spirit of Islam, we advocate freedom, fraternity, and an end to all repression, censorship, and injustices." They appealed to all opposition groups to join NCRI. Some secular groups had reservations that an "Islamic Democratic People's Republic" was unattainable, while Massoud Rajavi maintained that Shiite religion and pluralistic democracy are compatible. Along with former Iranian president Abolhassan Banisadr, Rajavi published a Covenant promoting freedom of speech, press, and religion in Iran, as well as protection of Iranian minorities, "especially the Kurdish minority".

In 2001, Kenneth Katzman wrote that the MEK had "tried to show itself as worthy of U.S. support on the basis of its commitment to values compatible with those of the United States – democracy, free market economics, protection of the rights of women and minorities, and peaceful relations with Iran's neighbors", but some analysts dispute that they are genuinely committed to what they state. According to Department of State's October 1994 report, the MEK used violence in its campaign to overthrow the Iranian regime. A 2009 U.S. Department of State report stated that their ideology was a blend of Marxism, Islamism and feminism.

The MEK says it is seeking regime change in Iran through peaceful means with an aim to replace the clerical rule in Iran with a secular government. It also claims to have disassociated itself from its former revolutionary ideology in favour of liberal democratic values, but they fail to "present any track record to substantiate a capability or intention to be democratic".

The MEK says it supports a "secular democratic system", where their leader, Maryam Rajavi, calls for a "pluralist system", a non-nuclear Iran, human rights and freedom of expression, a separation of government and religion, and an end to Sharia law.

=== Ideological revolution and women's rights ===
During the transitional period, the MEK projected an image of a "forward looking, radical and progressive Islamic force". Throughout the revolution, the MEK played a major role in developing the "revolutionary Muslim woman", which was portrayed as "the living example of the new ideal of womanhood". The MEK is "known for its female-led military units". According to Ervand Abrahamian, the MEK "declared that God had created men and women to be equal in all things: in political and intellectual matters, as well as in legal, economic, and social issues." According to Tohidi, in 1982, as the government in Tehran led an expansive effort to limit women's rights, the MEK adopted a female leadership. In 1987, the National Liberation Army (NLA), "saw female resistors commanding military operations from their former base at Camp Ashraf (in Diyala, Iraq) to Iran's westernmost provinces, where they engaged alongside the men in armed combat with Iran's regular and paramilitary forces".

Shortly after the revolution, Rajavi married Ashraf Rabii, an MEK member regarded as "the symbol of revolutionary womanhood". Rabii was killed by Iranian forces in 1982. On 27 January 1985, Massoud Rajavi appointed Maryam Azodanlu as his co-equal leader. The announcement, stated that this would give women equal say within the organisation and thereby "would launch a great ideological revolution within Mojahedin, the Iranian public and the whole Muslim World".

In 1985, Rajavi launched an "ideological revolution" banning marriage and enforced divorce on all members who were required to separate from their spouses. Five weeks later, the MEK announced that its Politburo and Central Committee had asked Rajavi and Azondalu, who was already married, to marry one another to deepen and pave the way for the "ideological revolution". At the time Maryam Azodanlu was known only as the younger sister of a veteran member, and the wife of Mehdi Abrishamchi. According to the announcement, Maryam Azodanlu and Mehdi Abrishamchi had recently divorced in order to facilitate this 'great revolution.' According to Ervand Abrahamian "in the eyes of traditionalists, particularly among the bazaar middle class, the whole incident was indecent. It smacked of wife-swapping, especially when Abrishamchi announced his own marriage to Khiabani's younger sister. It involved women with young children and wives of close friends – a taboo in traditional Iranian culture;" something that further isolated the Mojahedin and also upset some members of the organisation. Also according to Abrahamian, "the incident was equally outrageous in the eyes of the secularists, especially among the modern intelligentsia. It projected onto the public arena a matter that should have been treated as a private issue between two individuals." Many criticised Maryam Azodanlu's giving up her own maiden name (something most Iranian women did not do and she herself had not done in her previous marriage). They would question whether this was in line with her claims of being a staunch feminist.

Maryam Rajavi became increasingly important over feminism-coloured politics. The emancipation of women is now depicted in Maryam Rajavi's writings "as both a policy end and a strategy toward revolutionizing Iran. Secularism, democracy, and women's rights are thus today's leading themes in the group's strategic communications. As for Maryam Rajavi's leadership, in 2017 it appears to be political and cultural; any remnants of a military force and interest in terrorist strategies have faded away."

=== Cult of personality ===
The MEK has been described as a cult of personality by a variety of sources. The MEK has been described as a "cult" by the Iranian government and Iraqi politician Samir Sumaidaie. On May 25, 1981, Khomeini appeared on national television accusing those who criticised the Islamic Consultative Assembly's decisions of having a cult of personality.

It has also been described as a cult by the United States government, and another retired United States general described it as "Cult? How about admirably focused group?". Romain Nadal said the MEK had a "cult nature", and Bernard Kouchner said he was ashamed by Nadal's criticism. Also numerous academics and former MEK members who defected have described it as a cult.

Some sources argue that the Iranian government exploits such allegations to demonise the MEK. The Iranian government is reportedly running a disinformation campaign to discredit the MEK, with the head of the Mackenzie Institute commenting that "Iran is trying to get other countries to label it as a terrorist cult". According to a RAND Corporation report for the US government, during Masoud Rajavi's "ideological revolution", members were required to give "near-religious devotion" to its leaders. Also according to RAND, the MEK had "many of the typical characteristics of a cult, such as authoritarian control, confiscation of assets, sexual control (including mandatory divorce and celibacy), emotional isolation, forced labour, sleep deprivation, physical abuse and limited exit options," while this is vehemently denied by its supporters and leaders. United Press International (UPI) said that "The truth is that the group's ideology has evolved over the years in order to adapt with the region's geopolitical changes."

In 1990 MEK leadership ordered all couples to divorce, forbid them from remarrying, and children were sent away. Children were removed from the MEK camp because MEK "resistance fighters" are required to dedicate themselves to their cause. Critics often describe the MEK as the "cult of Rajavi", arguing that it revolves around the husband-and-wife duo, Maryam and Massoud Rajavi. Members reportedly had to participate in regular "ideological cleansings". According to RAND, members were lured in through "false promises of employment, land, aid in applying for asylum in Western countries" and then prevented from leaving. Masoud Banisadr, a vocal former member, suggested that the MEK had become a cult in order to survive.

== Structure and organisation ==
=== Organisations ===
Alongside its central organisation, the PMOI has a political wing, the National Council of Resistance of Iran (NCRI), established in 1981 with the stated goal of uniting the opposition to the Iranian government under one umbrella organisation. The organisation has the appearance of a broad-based coalition, but analysts consider NCRI and MEK to be synonymous and recognise the NCRI as an only "nominally independent" political wing of the PMOI. In 2002 the FBI reported that the NCRI has always been "an integral part" of the MEK and its "political branch".

The PMOI also historically maintained a dedicated armed wing known as the National Liberation Army of Iran (NLA) that was established in 1987 to serve as an infantry force and coordinate the different militant groups and members of the NCRI. It was formally disbanded in 2003 during the Iraq war.

Through its history, the MEK has maintained several front organisations including the Association of Iranian Scholars and Professionals, the Association of Iranian Women, Iran Aid, the California Society for Democracy, the Iranian-American Community of Northern Virginia and the Union Against Fundamentalism.

=== Membership ===
Before the Iran–Iraq War, the MEK was estimated to have about 2,000 members, peaking at 10,000 to 15,000 during the 1980s. (Note: Available estimates of historical MEK membership are: Jeffrey S. Dixon and Meredith Reid Sarkees estimating prewar strength at 2,000, later peaking to 10,000.; Pierre Razoux estimating maximum strength between 1981 and 1988 to about 15,000 fighters.) In the 2000s, the organisation had between 5,000 and 10,000 members, with 2,900 to 3,400 at Camp Ashraf. In February 2020, the MEK claimed to have 2,500 members in its Albania camp; a New York Times reporter visiting the camp estimated 200 people were present over two days.

=== Fundraising ===
During its life in exile, MEK was initially financed by backers including Saddam Hussein, and later a network of fake charities based in European countries.

In 2004, a report by the US weapons inspector Charles Duelfer claimed that Saddam Hussein provided millions of dollars from the United Nations' Oil-for-Food programme to the MEK.

In Germany, the MEK used a NGO to "support asylum seekers and refugees". Another alleged organisation collected funds for "children whose parents had been killed in Iran" in sealed and stamped boxes placed in city centres. According to the Nejat Society, in 1988, the Nuremberg MEK front organisation was uncovered by police. Initially, The Greens supported these organisations while it was unaware of their purpose.

In 1999, United States authorities arrested 29 individuals in Operation Eastern Approach, of whom 15 were held on charges of helping MEK members illegally enter the US. The ringleader pleaded guilty to providing phony documents to MEK members and violation of Antiterrorism and Effective Death Penalty Act of 1996.

The MEK also operated a UK-based charity, Iran Aid, which claimed to raise money for Iranian refugees. In 2001, the Charity Commission for England and Wales closed it down after finding no "verifiable links between the money donated by the British public [approximately £5 million annually] and charitable work in Iran".

In December 2001, a joint FBI-Cologne police operation discovered what a 2004 report calls "a complex fraud scheme involving children and social benefits", involving the sister of Maryam Rajavi. The High Court ruled to close several MEK compounds after investigations revealed that the organisation fraudulently collected between $5 million and $10 million in social welfare benefits for children of its members sent to Europe.

In 2003, General Intelligence and Security Service (AIVD) claimed that a Dutch charity that raises money for "children who suffer under the Iranian regime" (SIM (Dutch: Stichting Solidariteit met Iraanse Mensen)) was fundraising for the MEK. A spokesperson for the charity said that SIM was unrelated to the MEK and that these allegations were "lies from the Iranian regime".

As RAND Corporation policy reported, MEK supporters seek donations at public places, often showing "gruesome pictures" of human rights victims in Iran and claiming to raise money for them but funnelling it to MEK. A 2004 report by Federal Bureau of Investigation (FBI) states that the organisation is engaged "through a complex international money laundering operation that uses accounts in Turkey, Germany, France, Belgium, Norway, Sweden, Jordan, and the United Arab Emirates".

On 19 November 2004, two front organisations called the Iranian–American Community of Northern Virginia and the Union Against Fundamentalism organised demonstrations in front of the Capitol building in Washington, D.C., and transferred funds for the demonstration, some $9,000 to the account of a Texas MEK member. Congress and the bank in question were not aware that the demonstrators were actually providing material support to the MEK. According to Spiegel Online security experts say that U.S., Saudi Arabia and Israel provide the group with financial support, though there is no proof for this supposition and MEK denies this. The Hamburg state court ordered Der Spiegel in 2019 to remove unsupported claims from an article that accused the MEK of "torture" and "psychoterror."

=== Intelligence capabilities ===
During the years MEK was based in Iraq, it was closely associated with the intelligence service Mukhabarat (IIS), and even had a dedicated department in the agency. Directorate 14 of the IIS worked with the MEK in joint operations while Directorate 18 was exclusively responsible for the MEK and issued the orders and tasks for their operations. The MEK offered IIS with intelligence it gathered from Iran, interrogation and translation services.

A 2008 report by the United States Army Intelligence Center, states that the MEK operates a HUMINT network within Iran, which is "clearly a MEK core strength". It has started a debate among intelligence experts that "whether western powers should leverage this capability to better inform their own intelligence picture of the Iranian regime's goals and intentions". Rick Francona told Foreign Policy in 2005 that the MEK teams could work in conjunction with collection of intelligence and identifying agents. U.S. security officials maintain that the organisation has a record of exaggerating or fabricating information, according to Newsweek. David Kay believes that "they're often wrong, but occasionally they give you something".

American government sources told Newsweek in 2005 that the Pentagon is hoping to utilise MEK members as informants or give them training as spies for use against Tehran.

The MEK is able to conduct "telephone intelligence" operations effectively, i.e. gathering intelligence through making phone calls to officials and government organisations in Iran. According to Ariane Tabatabai, the MEK's "capabilities to conduct terrorist attacks may have decreased in recent years."

=== Propaganda and social media ===
The MEK's first act of counter-propaganda was to release about 2014 Iranian prisoners of war within a period of 9 months. It started on 11 March 1986 when the NLA released 370 prisoners of war. They then released 170 prisoners of war in November 1987 that had been captured by the NLA. A third wave of 1300 prisoners of war were released in August 1988, with some joining the NLA ranks. During the last release, Massoud Rajavi promoted this as an act of compassion by the NCRI, which was in contrast to the Islamic Republic's "cruel manner of treating" prisoners of war. In the 1980s and the 1990s, their propaganda was mainly targeted against the officials in the establishment. According to Anthony H. Cordesman, since the mid-1980s the MEK has confronted Iranian representatives overseas through "propaganda and street demonstrations". Other analysts have also alleged that there is a propaganda campaign by the MEK in the West, including Christopher C. Harmon and Wilfried Buchta, and others.

According to Kenneth Katzman, the MEK is able to mobilise its exile supporters in demonstration and fundraising campaigns. The organisation attempts to publicise regime abuses and curb foreign governments' relations with Tehran. To do so, it frequently conducts anti-regime marches and demonstrations in those countries.

A 1986 U.S. State Department letter to KSCI-TV described "MEK propaganda" as being in line with the following: "[T]he Iranian government is bad, the PMOI is against the Iranian government, the Iranian government represses the PMOI, therefore, the PMOI and its leader Rajavi are good and worth of support." According to Masoud Kazemzadeh, the MEK has also used propaganda against defectors of the organisation.

Al Jazeera reported on an alleged Twitter-based MEK campaign. According to Exeter University lecturer Marc Owen Jones, accounts tweeting #FreeIran and #Iran_Regime_Change "were created within about a four-month window", suggesting bot activity.

In an article published by The Intercept on 9 June 2019, two former MEK members claimed that "Heshmat Alavi" is not a real person, and that the articles published under that name were actually written by a team of people at the political wing of MEK. Alavi contributed to several media outlets including Forbes, The Diplomat, The Hill, The Daily Caller, The Federalist and the English edition of Al Arabiya's website. According to The Intercept, one of Alavi's articles published by Forbes was used by the White House to justify Donald Trump Administration's sanctions against Iran. Since the article's publication, Twitter has suspended the "Heshmat Alavi" account, and the writings in the name of "Heshmat Alavi" were removed from The Diplomat and Forbes' website. A website purported to be a personal blog of "Heshmat Alavi" published a post with counterclaims saying that their Twitter account had been suspended.

== Terrorist designation ==
=== Assignment of designation ===
The countries and organisations below have officially listed MEK as a terrorist organisation:

Currently listed by	Iran	Designated by the current government since 1981, also during Pahlavi dynasty until 1979
Currently listed by	Iraq	Designated by the post-2003 government
Formerly listed by	United States	Designated on 8 July 1997, delisted on 28 September 2012
Formerly listed by	United Kingdom	Designated on 28 March 2001, delisted on 24 June 2008
Formerly listed by	European Union	Designated in May 2002, delisted on 26 January 2009
Formerly listed by	Japan	Designated on 5 July 2002, delisted on 24 March 2013
Formerly listed by	Canada	Designated on 24 May 2005, delisted on 20 December 2012
Other designations	Australia	Not designated as terrorist but added to the 'Consolidated List' subject to the United Nations Security Council Resolution 1373 on 21 December 2001 Removed from the Consolidated List in late 2016.
Other designations	United Nations	The group was described as "involved in terrorist activities" by the United Nations Committee against Torture in 2008

In 1997, the United States put the MEK on the U.S. State Department list of Foreign Terrorist Organizations. The Los Angeles Times reported a senior official of the Clinton administration as saying that the designation of the MEK as a terrorist group "was intended as a goodwill gesture to Tehran and its newly elected president, Mohammad Khatami".

In 2004, the United States also considered the group as "noncombatants" and "protected persons" under the Geneva Conventions. In 2002, the European Union, pressured by Washington, added MEK to its terrorist list. In 2009, the U.S. Secretary of State Condoleezza Rice denied the MEK its request to be delisted. In 2008, the United Nations Committee against Torture said the MEK was involved in terrorist activities.

After the US invasion of Iraq, the MEK had a strong support base in the United States to be removed from its list of Foreign Terrorists Organizations, consequently turning it into a legitimate actor.

=== Removal of designation ===
The United Kingdom lifted the MEK's designation as a terrorist group in June 2008, followed by the Council of the European Union on 26 January 2009. It was also lifted in the United States following a decision by U.S. Secretary of State Hillary Clinton on 21 September 2012 and lastly in Canada on 20 December 2012.

The Council of the European Union removed the group's terrorist designation following the Court of Justice of the European Union's 2008 ruling, which criticised France for failing to reveal new supposed evidence that the MEK posed a terrorist threat. The EU courts declared that the listing was unlawful because of "serious procedural failures" and lack of evidence connecting the MEK with terrorist activities. Delisting allowed MEK to pursue tens of millions of dollars in frozen assets and lobby in Europe for more funds. It also removed the terrorist label from MEK members at Camp Ashraf in Iraq.

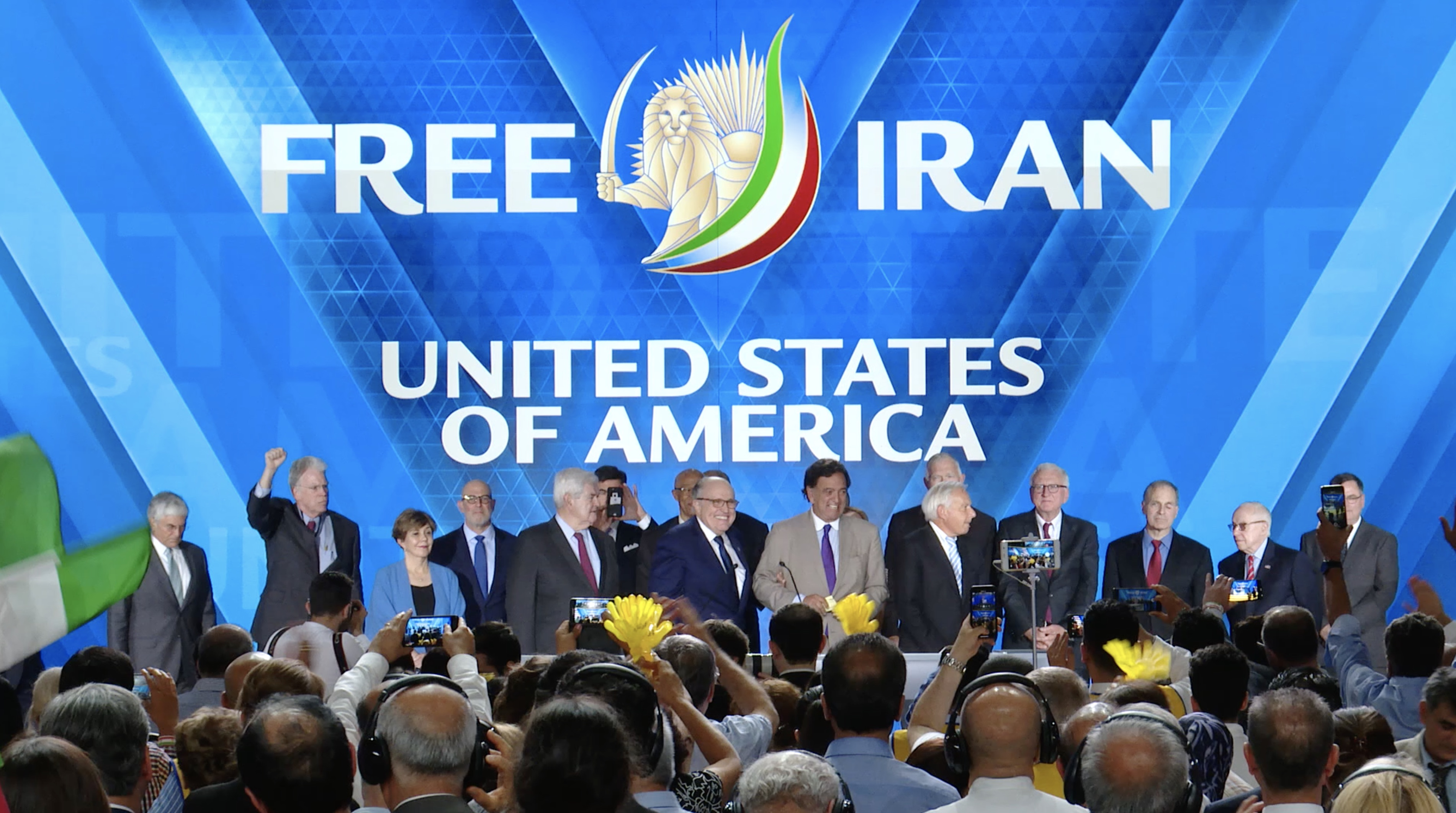
Rudy Giuliani, Newt Gingrich, James T. Conway, Bill Richardson and other American politicians at the MEK event in 2018

On 28 September 2012, the U.S. State Department formally removed MEK from its official list of terrorist organisations, beating a 1 October deadline in an MEK lawsuit. Secretary of State Clinton said in a statement that the decision was made because the MEK had renounced violence and had cooperated in closing their Iraqi paramilitary base. It was reported that MEK was removed from the U.S. list of terrorist organisations after intensive lobbying by a bipartisan group of lawmakers. An official denied that lobbying by well-known figures influenced the decision. Some former U.S. officials vehemently reject the new status and believe the MEK has not changed its ways. MEK leaders began a lobbying campaign to be removed from the list by promoting the group as a viable opposition to the clerical regime in Iran. During 2011, lobbying firms DLA Piper, Akin Gump Strauss Hauer & Feld and DiGenova & Toensing were paid almost $1,5 million by Iranian American organisations to lobby for delisting the MEK in the US.

The MEK advocated to remove itself from the list of Foreign Terrorist Organizations, having paid high-profile officials upwards of $50,000 give speeches calling for delisting. Ervand Abrahamian, Shaul Bakhash, Juan Cole and Gary Sick among others, published "Joint Experts' Statement on the Mujahedin-e Khalq" on Financial Times voicing their concerns regarding MEK delisting. The National Iranian American Council denounced the decision, stating it "opens the door to Congressional funding of the M.E.K. to conduct terrorist attacks in Iran" and "makes war with Iran far more likely." Iran state television also condemned the delisting of the group, saying that the U.S. considers MEK to be "good terrorists because the U.S. is using them against Iran".

The campaign to delist the MEK in the European Union counted with Spanish MEP Alejo Vidal-Quadras as one of its lobbyists. Vox, the far-right party he founded, later received funding by the National Council of Resistance of Iran. The party received almost €1 million between December 2013 and April 2014.

== Foreign relations ==
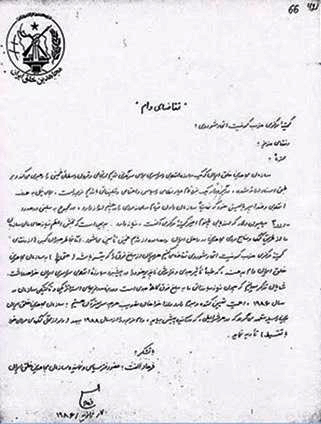
Letter in Persian requesting that the Central Committee of the Communist Party of the Soviet Union lend any amount of money (up to US$300,000,000) to the Mojahedin Organization and requesting that the supporters of the Mojahedin Organization be allowed to cross the Soviet-Iranian border and be granted a temporary asylum. Memorandum to the CK KPSS from Olfat.

While dealing with anti-regime clergy in 1974, the MEK became close with secular Left groups in and outside Iran. These included the confederation of Iranian Students, The People's Democratic Republic of Yemen (South Yemen), and the Popular Front for the Liberation of Oman, among others. The MEK sent five trained members into South Yemen to fight in the Dhofar Rebellion against Omani and Iranian forces.

On 7 January 1986, the MEK leaders sent a twelve-page letter to the "comrades" of Central Committee of the Communist Party of the Soviet Union, asking for temporary asylum and a loan of $300 million to continue their "revolutionary anti-imperialist" actions. It is not clear how the Soviets responded, according to Abbas Milani.

Israel's foreign intelligence agency Mossad maintains connections with the MEK, dating back to the 1990s. Until 2001, the MEK received support from the Taliban. The MEK was also among the opposition groups receiving support from Gulf nations such as Saudi Arabia.

In April 2012, journalist Seymour Hersh reported that the U.S. Joint Special Operations Command had trained MEK operatives at a secret site in Nevada from 2005 to 2009. According to Hersh, MEK members were trained in intercepting communications, cryptography, weaponry and small unit tactics at the Nevada site up until President Barack Obama took office in 2009.

=== Position on the Israel–Palestinian conflict ===
Initially, the MEK used to criticise the Pahlavi dynasty for allying with Israel and Apartheid South Africa, calling them racist states and demanding cancellation of all political and economic agreements with them. The MEK opposed Israeli–Palestinian peace process and was anti-Zionist.

The MEK's Central Cadre established contact with the Palestine Liberation Organization (PLO), by sending emissaries to Paris, Dubai, and Qatar to meet PLO officials. On 3 August 1972, they bombed the Jordanian embassy as a means to avenge King Hussein's unleashing his troops on the PLO in 1970.

=== Relations with the United States ===
In the late 1970s, the intelligentsia as a class in Iran was distinctly nationalistic and anti-imperialistic. The MEK had impeccable nationalistic credentials, calling for the nationalisation of foreign companies and economic independence from the capitalist world, and praising writers such as Al-e Ahmad, Saedi and Shariati for being "anti-imperialist". Rajavi in his presidential campaign after revolution used to warn against what he called the "imperialist danger." The matter was so fundamental to MEK that it criticised the Iranian government on that basis, accusing the Islamic Republic of "capitulation to imperialism" and being disloyal to democracy that according to Rajavi was the only means to "safeguard from American imperialism."

After exile, the MEK sought the support of prominent politicians, academics and human rights lawyers. Rajavi tried to reach as broad a Western public as possible by giving frequent interviews to Western newspapers. In these interviews, Rajavi toned down the issues of imperialism, foreign policy, and social revolution. Instead, he stressed the themes of democracy, political liberties, political pluralism, human rights, respect for 'personal property,' the plight of political prisoners, and the need to end the senseless war.

Hyeran Jo, associate professor of Texas A&M University wrote in 2015 that the MEK is supported by the United States. In January 1993, President-elect Clinton wrote a private letter to Massoud Rajavi, in which he set out his support for the organisation. The organisation has also received support United States officials including Tom Ridge, Howard Dean, Michael Mukasey, Louis Freeh, Hugh Shelton, Rudy Giuliani, John Bolton, Bill Richardson, James L. Jones, and Edward G. Rendell.

As Mukasey mentioned in The New York Times, in 2011 he had received $15,000 to $20,000 to present a lecture about "MEK-related events", as well as what he listed as "a foreign agent lobbying pro bono for MEK's political arm". Rendell said he had been paid to speak in support of the MEK and Hamilton said he was paid to "appear on a panel Feb. 19 at the Mayflower Hotel in Washington." In February 2015, The Intercept published that Bob Menendez, John McCain, Judy Chu, Dana Rohrabacher and Robert Torricelli received campaign contributions from MEK supporters.

Some politicians have declared receiving payment for supporting the MEK, but others support the group without payment. In May 2018, Daniel Benjamin who held office as the Coordinator for Counterterrorism between 2009 and 2012, told The New York Times that the MEK offered him money in exchange for his support.

== Human rights record ==
In 2006, Iraqi Prime Minister Al-Maliki told the MEK it had to leave Iraq, but the MEK responded that the "request violated their status under the Geneva Convention". Al-Maliki and the Iraqi Ministry of Justice maintained that the MEK had committed human rights abuses in the early 1990s when it aided Saddam Hussain's campaign against the Shia uprising. According to Time magazine, the MEK has denied aiding Saddam in quashing Kurdish and Shia rebellions.

In May 2005, Human Rights Watch (HRW) issued a report describing prison camps run by the MEK and severe human rights violations committed by the group against its members, ranging from prolonged incommunicado and solitary confinement to beatings, verbal and psychological abuse, coerced confessions, threats of execution, and torture that in two cases led to death. This report was disputed by the UK's Lord Corbett. Human Rights Watch released a statement in February 2006 stating the criticisms they received concerning the substance and methodology of the report were unwarranted.

Former American military officers who had aided in guarding the MEK camp in Iraq gave differing accounts. Those suggested by MEK said its members had been free to leave the camp and that they had not found any prison or torture facilities. Captain Woodside who was not one of those who MEK suggested, said that US officers did not have regular access to camp buildings, or to group members and that it was difficult for members to leave. Jo Hyeran, in her work examining humanitarian violations of rebel groups to international law, states that the MEK has not accepted International Committee of the Red Cross (ICRC) visits to its detention centres. According to criticism from Human Right groups, marriage had been banned in the camp. Upon entry into the group, new members are indoctrinated in ideology and a revisionist history of Iran. All members are required to participate in weekly "ideologic cleansings". Members who defected from the MEK and some experts say that these Mao-style self-criticism sessions are intended to enforce control over sex and marriage in the organisation as a total institution. MEK denied the brainwashing describing it as part of Iranian 'misinformation campaign.' Also Abbas Milani calls those describing MEK as a cult as lobbyists paid by Iranian regime. In July 2020 a German court ordered the Frankfurter Allgemeine Zeitung to remove false information about the MEK.

== Intelligence campaigns against the MEK ==
The Shah's regime waged a propaganda campaign against the MEK, accusing them "of carrying out subversive acts at the behest of their foreign patrons" and claiming that "the shoot-outs and bombings caused heavy casualties among bystanders and innocent civilians, especially women and children". It also obtained "public confessions" that accused former colleagues of crimes including sexual promiscuity. The regime claimed that the MEK were "unbelievers masquerading as Muslims", and used the Quranic term "monafeqin" (hypocrites) to describe them.

The Islamic Republican Party later used many of the same tactics, labelling the MEK "Marxist hypocrites and Western-contaminated 'electics', and as 'counter-revolutionary terrorists' collaborating with the Iraqi Ba'thists and the imperialists". After the 1994 Imam Reza shrine bomb explosion in Mashhad which killed 25 and wounded at least 70 people, the Iranian regime immediately blamed the MEK. A month after the attack, a Sunni group calling itself "al-haraka al-islamiya al-iraniya" claimed responsibility for the attack. Despite this, the Iranian government continued to hold the MEK responsible for both attacks. According to an anonymous U.S. official, Ramzi Yousef built the bomb and MEK agents placed it in the shrine.

Even into the 2000s, the MEK has remained a major target of Iran's internal security apparatus. Since 2001, several reports by Dutch, German and US intelligence services have noted the ongoing efforts by the Iran's Ministry of Intelligence to "track down and identify those who are in contact with opposition groups abroad", including the MEK. German and US intelligence have noted that Iranian intelligence was directly financing a misinformation campaign and trying to recruit active or former members of opposition groups, sometimes through "threats to use force against them or their families living in Iran".

In 2018, U.S. District Court charged two alleged Iran agents of "conducting covert surveillance of Israeli and Jewish facilities in the United States and collecting intelligence on Americans linked to a political organization that wants to see the current Iranian government overthrown". During the court process, it was revealed that the two alleged agents of Iran had mostly gathered information concerning activities involving the MEK. The two men pleaded guilty in November 2019 to several charges including conspiracy and "acting as an undeclared agent of the Iranian government". The Justice Department said that one of the men arrived in the US to gather "intelligence information" about the MEK (as well as Israeli and Jewish entities). The other admitted to taking photographs at a 2017 MEK rally in order to profile attendees.

In January 2020, Ahmadreza Mohammadi-Doostdar, an Iranian-American, was sentenced by a U.S. court to 38 months in prison for conducting surveillance on American MEK members. In September 2020 The New York Times published a report where researchers alleged that opponents of the Iranian regime had been targets of a cyber attack by Iranian hackers through a variety of infiltration techniques. MEK was reportedly among the most prominent targets of the attacks.

=== Targeting of MEK members outside Iran ===
From 1989 to 1993, the Islamic Republic of Iran carried out numerous assassinations of MEK members. Between March and June 1990, three MEK members were assassinated in Turkey. On 24 February 1990, Dr Kazem Rajavi (a National Council member) was assassinated in Geneva. In January 1993, an MEK member was murdered in Baghdad.

On 23 September 1991, an attempt was carried out to assassinate Massoud Rajavi in Baghdad. In August 1992, an MEK member was kidnapped and brought to Iran. In September 1992, MEK offices in Baghdad were broken into. In January 1993, a MEK bus was bombed without casualties. Towards the end of 1993, anonymous gunmen attacked Air France offices and the French embassy in Iran after France allowed Maryam Rajavi and 200 MEK members to enter France.

In March 1993, the NCRI's spokesman was murdered in Italy. In May 1990, an MEK member was murdered in Cologne. In February 1993, an MEK member was murdered in Manila. In April 1992, an MEK member was murdered in the Netherlands. In August 1992, an MEK member was murdered in Karachi. In March 1993, two assassins on motorcycles murdered NCRI representative Mohammad Hossein Naqdi in Italy. This led to the European Parliament issuing a condemnation of the Islamic Republic of Iran for political murder.

The Iranian regime is also believed to be responsible for killing NCR representative in 1993, and Massoud Rajavi's brother in 1990. The MEK claims that in 1996 a shipment of Iranian mortars was intended for use by Iranian agents against Maryam Rajavi. In May 1994, Islamic Republic agents assassinated two MEK members in Iraq. In May 1995, five MEK members were assassinated in Iraq. In 1996, two MEK members were murdered in Turkey (including NCRI member Zahra Rajabi); in the same year two MEK members were killed in Pakistan and another one in Iraq.

== Support ==
=== Inside Iran ===
After the 1979 Iranian revolution, the MEK gained significant support from the Iranian public, becoming the most popular dissident group. It also received support from national figures including intellectuals, military officers, and athletes. Following the Iran–Iraq ceasefire, the Iranian regime executed Iranian citizens in western Iran accused of assisting the MEK. The regime continues to target MEK supporters in the present day. Inside Iran, the strength of the MEK is uncertain since many of its supporters have been executed, tortured, or jailed. Its supporters within Iran have remained persistent, resisting the regime's attempts to eradicate the organisation from the country. Kenneth Katzman wrote in 2001 that the MEK is "Iran's most active opposition group".

After becoming more violent and siding with Saddam Hussein's Iraq during the Iran–Iraq War the MEK's standing inside Iran diminished. Many Iranians maintain that the group cannot be forgiven for aligning with Iraq in the Iran–Iraq conflict. The MEK is unpopular today within Iran, largely due to its siding with Iraq in the Iran–Iraq War and continued ties with the government of Saddam Hussein afterwards. Karim Sadjadpour believes the MEK is a "fringe group with mysterious benefactors" with a negligible amount of supporters in Iran. A 2009 report published by the Brookings Institution notes that the organisation appears to be undemocratic and lacking popularity but maintains an operational presence in Iran, acting as a proxy against Tehran. The group has been described as Iran's main political opposition group.

=== Outside Iran ===
During the 1970s the group received assistance from the Liberation Movement. In the 1980s, the MEK and the Kurdish Democratic Party, the National Democratic Front, the Hoviyat Group, and other groups joined the National Council of Resistance of Iran. Other groups opposing Khomeini's government, such as the National Resistance Movement of Iran (NAMIR), led by Shapour Bakhtiar, criticised and rejected cooperation with the MEK. The MEK has received political backing from American politicians advocating regime change in Iran. Kenneth Katzman suggests that it's hard to determine the level of MEK support among Iran's exiles. While certain groups have distanced themselves from the organisation, others have lent their support.

== In the media ==
The MEK has been featured in several documentaries, including A Cult That Would Be an Army: Cult of the Chameleon (2007), The Strange World of the People's Mujahedin (2012) and Midday Adventures (2017).

== See also ==
- Iranian opposition
- Iran Prosperity Project
- Reza Pahlavi
- Guerrilla groups of Iran
- Order of battle during the Iran–Iraq War
- Organizations of the Iranian Revolution
- Trial of Hamid Nouri
- List of people assassinated by the People's Mujahedin of Iran
- List of works about the People's Mujahedin of Iran

== Bibliography ==
- Abrahamian, Ervand (1982). Iran Between Two Revolutions. Princeton University. doi:10.2307/j.ctv1fkgcnz.
- Abrahamian, Ervand (1989). Radical Islam: The Iranian Mojahedin. I. B. Tauris. ISBN 978-1-85043-077-3.
- Cimment, James (2011). World Terrorism: An Encyclopedia of Political Violence from Ancient Times to the Post-9/11 Era: An Encyclopedia of Political Violence from Ancient Times to the Post-9/11 Era, 2nd Edition. Routledge. doi:10.4324/9781315697994. ISBN 978-0765682840.
- Clark, Mark Edmond (2016). "An Analysis of the Role of the Iranian Diaspora in the Financial Support System of the Mujahedin-e-Khalq". In Gold, David (ed.). Terrornomics. Routledge. pp. 66–76. doi:10.4324/9781315612140. ISBN 978-1-317-04590-8.
- Cohen, Ronen (2009). The Rise and Fall of the Mojahedin Khalq, 1987-1997: Their Survival After the Islamic Revolution and Resistance to the Islamic Republic of Iran. Sussex Academic Press. ISBN 978-1-84519-270-9.
- Cohen, Ronen (August 2018). "The Mojahedin-e Khalq versus the Islamic Republic of Iran: from war to propaganda and the war on propaganda and diplomacy". Middle Eastern Studies. 54 (6): 1000–1014. doi:10.1080/00263206.2018.1478813. S2CID 149542445.
- Fayazmanesh, Sasan (2008). The United States and Iran Sanctions, wars and the policy of dual containment. Routledge. ISBN 978-0-203-94620-6.
- Goulka, Jeremiah; Hansell, Lydia; Wilke, Elizabeth; Larson, Judith (2009). The Mujahedin-e Khalq in Iraq: A Policy Conundrum (PDF) (Report). RAND corporation. Archived (PDF) from the original on 22 February 2016.
- Harmon, Christopher C.; Bowdish, Randall G. (2018). "Advertising: The People's Mujahideen e Khalq". The Terrorist Argument: Modern Advocacy and Propaganda. Brookings Institution. ISBN 978-0-8157-3219-8. JSTOR 10.7864/j.ctt1vjqr1x.11.
- Katzman, Kenneth (2001). "Iran: The People's Mojahedin Organization of Iran". In Benliot, Albert V. (ed.). Iran: Outlaw, Outcast, Or Normal Country?. Nova Science Publishers. ISBN 978-1-56072-954-9.
- Keddie, Nikki R. (2006). Modern Iran: Roots and Results of Revolution. Yale University Press. ISBN 978-0-300-12105-6.
- Moin, Baqer (2001). Khomeini: Life of the Ayatollah. I. B. Tauris. ISBN 978-1-84511-790-0.
- O'Hern, Steven K. (2012). Iran's Revolutionary Guard: The Threat that Grows While America Sleeps. Potomac Books. ISBN 978-1-59797-823-1.
- Vahabzadeh, Peyman (2010). Guerrilla Odyssey: Modernization, Secularism, Democracy, and the Fadai Period of National Liberation In Iran, 1971–1979. Syracuse University Press. JSTOR j.ctt1j5d726.
- Piazza, James A. (October 1994). "The Democratic Islamic Republic of Iran in Exile". Digest of Middle East Studies. 3 (4): 9–43. doi:10.1111/j.1949-3606.1994.tb00535.x.
- Zabih, Sepehr (1988). "The Non-Communist Left in Iran: The Case of the Mujahidin". In Chelkowski, Peter J.; Pranger, Robert J. (eds.). Ideology and Power in the Middle East. Duke University Press. pp. 241–258. doi:10.1515/9780822381501-014. ISBN 978-0-8223-8150-1. S2CID 242204076.
