= Neda Hassani =

Iranian political activist (1977–2003)

Nedā Hassani
- Born: 1977; Tehran, Imperial State of Iran
- Died: 23 June 2003 (aged 25–26); London, England
- Cause of death: Burns from self-immolation
- Education: Carleton University

Neda Hassani (Persian: ندا حسنی; 1977 – 23 June 2003) was an Iranian dissident.

== History ==
Neda Hassani was born to Ahmed and Foroogh Hassani. She was the eldest child of an Iranian family of three children. The family left Iran in the early 1980s, taking refuge in Greece before settling in Ottawa, Ontario, Canada. Hassani attended Carleton University, where she studied computer science.

In 1988, Hassani became a supporter of the People's Mujahedin of Iran, following the Islamic Republic's execution of her uncle, Mahmoud Hassani. However, according to her parents, she was not a member of the organisation. Mahmoud Hassani was the younger brother of her father, and had been imprisoned for seven years in Iran, prior to his execution. As a child, Hassani had visited her uncle in prison. Her uncle was among a group of an estimated 35,000 dissidents executed at that time. Hassani's support for the Mujahedin led her to move to Paris, where she joined the National Council of Resistance of Iran.

On 17 June 2003, Hassani was on holiday in London, when police in France raided the headquarters of the People's Mojahedin of Iran. Approximately 160 members were held for questioning, including Maryam Rajavi, a co-leader of the group, with her husband, Massoud Rajavi. All charges were later dropped.

Hassani had joined a student protest at the French embassy in London, protesting the arrest in France and possible deportation to Iran of Rajavi and other members of the Mujahedin. There was a discussion among some of the protesters of protesting via self-immolation. Hassani was quoted as saying "We all think of doing that", despite the fact that co-leader Maryam Rajavi expressed her opposition to suicidal protests. On the evening of 18 June, at approximately 7:15 p.m., Hassani returned by herself to the front of the French embassy in London, where she doused herself in gasoline and set herself on fire. She was found two hours later, and subsequently died in hospital on 23 June, in the presence of her mother, having never regained consciousness.

Hassani was one of four people who set themselves on fire in front of the French embassy in London, in the days following the arrests of Mujahedin members in France. Another of the four, Heshmat Zandi, a 38-year-old engineering student, also died. During the same period, three people set themselves on fire in Paris, one of whom, Sedighieh Mohageri, died, while another person was prevented from setting himself on fire, after dousing himself with gasoline in front of the French embassy in Switzerland.

Hassani's body was returned to Canada for burial. Her funeral was held on 30 June 2003, where Hassani's mother expressed pride in her daughter's actions. She also expressed similar sentiments in England, immediately following her daughter's death, while discouraging others from following her daughter's example. Hassani is buried at Pinecrest Cemetery in Ottawa.
