= Jafar Kazemi =

Iranian Political Prisoner

- Born: 1964
- Died: 24 January 2011 (aged 46–47); Evin Prison, Iran
- Cause of death: Execution by hanging
- Occupations: Lithographer for textbooks and pamphlets at Amirkabir University of Technology

Jafar Kazemi (Persian: جعفر کاظمی) was a political prisoner in Iran who was sentenced to death for co-operation with the Iranian opposition group People's Mujahedin of Iran (PMOI or MEK) and was hanged in Evin Prison on January 24, 2011, along with another political prisoner, Mohammad Ali Haj Aghaei. His execution was widely covered by the press and brought international attention to the human rights situation in Iran.

== Arrest ==
Jafar Kazemi was a lithographer for textbooks and pamphlets at Amirkabir University of Technology. He was arrested on September 18, 2009, during the massive demonstration in Tehran and was transferred to Evin prison. In the 1980s and 1990s, he was arrested for being a member of the opposition group PMOI and for spending time at Camp Ashraf in Iraq to visit his son.

== Execution ==
According to his wife, Jafar Kazemi had been tortured by Iranian authorities.

The torture were reportedly physical and psychological, and interrogators allegedly threatened Kazemi with arresting his wife and children if he did not confess.

Prosecutors accused Kazemi of sending images of 2009 presidential election protests to "foreign contacts", shouting "anti-government slogans", and of visiting his son in Camp Ashraf, an MEK camp at the time.

According to a National Council of Resistance of Iran spokesperson, Kazemi (and Haj Aqaei) had been apprehended by Iranian authorities after visiting Camp Ashraf.

On January 24, 2011, Kazemi was hanged for his alleged ties to the People's Mojahedin Organization of Iran (MEK), an opposition group to the Iranian regime. Mohammad Ali Haj-Aghai and Ali Saremi were also hanged in Evin prison for being MEK supporters.

The Iranian government's official explanation for the execution was that "Two elements of the Monafeghin (hypocrites) cell named Jafar Kazemi...and Mohammad Ali Hajaghaei...were executed early today." The Iranian regime refers to the MEK with the derogatory name "Monafeghin".

== International response ==
Hillary Clinton said that Kazemi was "exercising their right to free expression", and urged the Iranian regime to halt the execution. The United States government also urged Iranian authorities to "halt these executions in accordance with its obligations to the International Covenant on Civil and Political Rights".

== See also ==
- Mohammad Ali Haj Aghaei
- Human rights in the Islamic Republic of Iran
- Evin Prison
