= Execution of Ali Saremi =

Ali Saremi
- Born: 1948
- Died: 28 December 2010 (aged 61–62); Evin Prison, Iran
- Cause of death: Execution by hanging

Ali Saremi (Persian: علی صارمی) was a political prisoner in Iran who was sentenced to death for co-operation with the Iranian opposition group People's Mujahedin of Iran (PMOI) and was hanged in Evin Prison on December 28, 2010. Saremi's torture and execution was covered in the press and brought international attention to the Human rights situation in Iran.

== Arrest ==
Saremi was the longest-serving political prisoner in Iran. He was imprisoned for about 23 years in Iranian prisons before and after the Iranian revolution in 1979. His latest arrest came in 2007 after visiting his son at Camp Ashraf, a refugee community in Iraq that was home to an estimated 3,500 exiled members of the Mujahedeen, PMOI.

According to sources, Ali Saremi was hanged on December 10, 2010, by the Iranian government in Iran for sympathizing with the MEK's ideological aspirations.

Saremi, who was 63 years old at the time of execution, was executed after being convicted of "Moharebeh" (fighting with God), "propaganda against the holy Islamic system," and belonging to the MEK organization, although there were no reports that he was involved in MEK activities.

== See also ==
- Human rights in the Islamic Republic of Iran
- Evin Prison
- StopExecutionsinIran
