= 1981–1982 Iran massacres =

Killings during Iran's cultural revolution

- Part of the Iranian Cultural Revolution
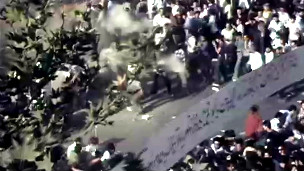
- Iranian protests of June 20, 1981
- Location: Iran
- Type: Widespread executions
- Target: Political and religious opponents and dissidents, critics of Ruhollah Khomeini's government
- Perpetrator: Islamic Republic of Iran
- Deaths: > 3,500 executed

The 1981–1982 Iran massacres were a state-sponsored campaign of violence aimed at exterminating political and religious adversaries of the Islamic Republic of Iran. It followed a period of unrest and protests that culminated in the June 28, 1981 bombing at the Islamic Republican Party headquarters, in which 74 leading officials of the Islamic Republic of Iran were killed. The subsequent period of retaliations became known as the "reign of terror". The victims included intellectuals, scientists, artists, socialists, social democrats, members and sympathizers of Mujahedin-e-Khalq, nationalists, liberals, monarchists, ethnic minorities, and followers of minority religions such as the Bahá'í Faith.

It was largely fueled by the Iranian Cultural Revolution decreed by Ruhollah Khomeini on 14 June 1980, with the intent of "purifying" Iranian society of non-Islamic elements. In July 2024, the UN Special Rapporteur on Human Rights in Iran published a landmark report on the 1981 massacre and categorised the atrocity crimes committed in 1981 and 1982 as genocide and crimes against humanity. In this report, the Rapporteur called for the establishment of an independent and international accountability mechanism.

== Historical background ==
The 1981 massacre in Iran occurred two years after the 1979 revolution, under the pretext of Islamizing the political and legal systems in the newly established Islamic Republic. The government, led by Ayatollah Khomeini, sought to implement a theocratic framework based on his interpretations of Shia Islam and the doctrine of velayat-e faqih. Aiming to transform Iranian society into a Shi'ite theocracy, Khomeini issued several fatwas and executive orders to "purify" public institutions and higher education from Marxist, non-Islamic, Western, and liberal influences. The massacre was carried out under the cover of the Iranian Cultural Revolution. Initiated by an order from Ayatollah Khomeini on June 14, 1980, the revolution sought to remove Western, liberal, and leftist elements from the education system, leading to the closure of universities, the banning of student unions, and violent occupations of campuses. During this period, Shia clerics imposed policies to Islamize Iranian society, mandating hijabs for women, expelling critical academics, suppressing secular political groups, and persecuting intellectuals and artists.

These measures sparked large-scale protests across the country. On June 15, 1981, the National Front and other secular opposition groups publicly criticized a proposal to Islamify the criminal justice system, prompting Ayatollah Khomeini to issue a fatwā, which led to the mass arrest of hundreds of protesters and critics. On June 20th, a large anti-government protest organized by the People's Mojahedin Organization of Iran responded to the controversial impeachment of President Abolhassan Banisadr. Authorities announced that demonstrators, of any age, would be labeled 'enemies of God'. The Islamic Revolutionary Guard Corps shot into crowds of protestors, resulting in around fifty deaths and over 200 injuries.

In response to the growing waves of protests, clerics reacted ferociously. Ayatollah Khomeini made several religious statements against critics, characterizing them as apostates (murtad), "anti-Islam" communists (zed-e Islam), atheists (kafir), and religious hypocrites (munafiqs). Following Khomeini's order, hundreds of young protestors (including teenage girls) and critics were arrested, many sentenced to death by the Islamic Revolutionary Courts. On 21 June 1981, Saeed Soltanpour, a prominent poet and playwright, along with 14 other leftist dissidents, were summarily executed on charges of 'enmity against Islam, Allah, and his prophet' and 'spreading corruption on earth'. Their executions marked the beginning of the largest wave of mass executions that the country would witness in its recent history. Between June 1981 to March 1982, thousands of dissidents were subjected to systematic torture, summary, and arbitrary executions on religiously motivated charges of moharebeh ('enmity against Allah'), ifsad-fil-arz ('spreading corruption on Earth'), and irtidad (apostasy). On June 28, the Islamic Republic's opponents, allegedly, retaliated with a bombing at the IRP headquarters. This period in Iran became known as the "reign of terror".

== Scope of the massacre ==
While the actual extent of 1981 massacre is still unknown, Rastyad Collective has verified and documented the identities of more than 3,500 victims who were executed between 21 June 1981 and 21 March 1982 in 85 cities. This data is based on more than 250 official documents from judiciary and political authorities, including statements and press releases issued by the Islamic Revolutionary Courts and the Islamic Revolutionary Guard Corps (IRGC) in these cities. Many victims of state violence during the 1981 massacre were below the age of eighteen. At least 103 individuals, accounting for 10% of identified victims, killed or executed in Tehran were minors. Many of these underage victims were subjected to arbitrary detention, brutal torture, and summary executions on charges of moharebeh (enmity against Allah) and ifsad-fil-arz (spreading corruption on Earth). These figures and findings were highlighted by a landmark UN report by the UN Special Rapporteur on the Human Rights Situation in Iran. Other academic sources have offered similar estimates concerning the scope of the massacre.

== Targets ==
During this period the government carried out coordinated attacks against the civilian population through a state policy aimed at eliminating groups that were viewed as a threat. This included a wide range of Iranian citizens targeted due to their actual or suspected opposition to the Islamic Republic.

According to official records the Iranian government labeled all its political opponents as "moharebs," "mufsids," counterrevolutionaries, "hypocrites," terrorists, "apostates," or pro-Western mercenaries. State-sponsored violence was not directed at a single group but aimed to eliminate a wide range of political ideologies that could challenge the state. These included liberals, nationalists, ethnic minorities, communists, Mujahedin-e Khalq (the largest opposition group), socialists, social democrats, monarchists, or followers of the Baháʼí Faith.

=== Execution of minors and youth ===
During the massacre, hundreds of minors were also subjected to arbitrary detention, torture, and summary executions on ideologically motivated charges of ifsad-fi-alarz and moharebeh by the revolutionary courts. Between June 1981 and March 1982, the highest proportion of executions were of individuals aged 11 to 24. Most of these young activists were high school students or recent graduates from universities in Iran and abroad. Data also shows that over 10% of the victims were minors—under 18 years old. The youngest among them were Amrollah Kordi-Loo (1970-1981) and Elaheh Mohabbat (1965-1981), who were executed at 11 and 15 years old. In the context of Iran's modern social and historical situation, the execution of minors was an unprecedented and contentious event.

== Response from Iranian officials ==
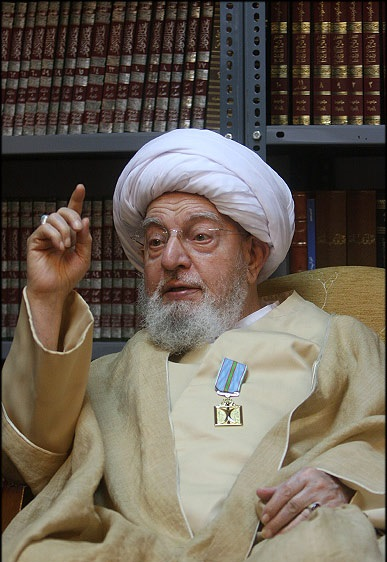
Mohammad Mohammadi Gilani (2009), one of the judges that handed out death sentences to protestors

The ruling clerics intended to dismantle any prospects of blending modernism with Islam, a vision once idealistically pursued by President Banisadr. Even though Banisadr's father, Ayatollah Seyed Nasrollah Banisadr, had been "an Islamic leader revered by Khomeini", clerics saw him as a potentially dangerous Western, secular influence within the revolutionary government.

A three-man presidential council was formed in 1981. The council was headed by Ayatollah Mohammad Beheshti, with Akbar Rafsanjani and Mohammad-Ali Rajai as the other members. Mohammad Mohammadi Gilani was one of the judges that handed out death sentences to protestors. During a press conference, Gilani justified the trials and executions of the young girls, stating, "By the Islamic canon, a nine-year-old girl is mature. So there is no difference for us between a nine-year-old girl and a 40-year-old man."

In a TV interview, Tehran Revolutionary Prosecutor Asadollah Lajevardi acknowledged that flogging and physical punishment were employed as effective strategies to promote "repentance" and to help integrate "political prisoners into the Islamic Republics order". This methodical use of torture aimed to alter prisoners' religious beliefs, political views, and worldviews, while also pressuring them to make false public confessions.

== Legal dimension ==
The 1981-1982 massacre marked a pivotal period when Sharia judges in Iran gained the power to define and enforce their interpretation of "Islamic justice". They used rulings and verdicts to turn terms such as "corruption on earth" and "waging war on Allah" into political tools, branding their critics as "hypocrites," "enemies of Allah," and "apostates." These terms were eventually codified in the 1982 Penal Code, which formed the basis of the modern Judicial system of the Islamic Republic of Iran. Those arrested were not allowed legal assistance, and confessions could be obtained under torture. The large-scale execution of children breached Article 6(5) of the International Covenant on Civil and Political Rights, which Iran had ratified in 1975.

=== Genocide accusation ===
According to Nasiri and Faghfouri Azar, the religious nature of the accusations against dissidents during the massacres, along with the systematic establishment of ad hoc religious tribunals (Islamic Revolutionary Courts) across the country, strongly suggests that the Islamic regime had a deliberate intent to eliminate groups it perceived as anti-Islamic, including the PMOI, Marxists, communists, and other political organisations with non-theistic ideologies. In a landmark UN report from July 2024, The UN Special Rapporteur on the Human Rights Situation in Iran characterised the atrocities committed in 1981 and 1982 as the crime of genocide and crimes against humanities and called for "the establishment of an international accountability mechanism to ensure prompt, impartial, thorough and transparent criminal investigations".

Similarly, Nasiri observes that more than ninety percent of the victims came from the Mojahedin and various Marxist groups. After a series of decrees and statements from Khomeini and other high-ranking clerics, these dissidents were labeled religious outlaws. Marxists, because of their atheistic or non-theistic beliefs, were broadly classified as “apostate” (murtad) or “atheist” (mulhid) communists. Between 1980 and 1983, Khomeini issued multiple decrees and fatwās targeting communists, identifying them as infidels (kafir) and apostate “mini-groups” (gorouhak-haye murtad). The Mojahedin were categorized as Munafiqin, an anti-Islam faction threatening both Islam and clerical authority. Based on these religious classifications, supporters of the Mojahedin and Marxist groups were subjected to systematic extermination. According to Nasiri and Rehman, the explicit theological rationale behind official decrees supporting these killings provide grounds for interpreting them as acts of religious genocide.

== Research ==
Rastyad Collective has documented over 3,500 executions in 85 different cities that were carried out between June 1981 to March 1982. Moreover, the Rastyad Collective has documented the grave locations and identities of over 1,000 executed victims in Tehran's largest cemetery, Behesht-e Zahra. These findings are based on archival research, fieldwork, legal analysis and geolocation techniques. During an event organized by the University of Amsterdam and the NIOD Institute for War, Holocaust and Genocide Studies, Javaid Rehman, the UN Special Rapporteur on the Human Rights Situation in Iran, underscored these findings and indicated that the research on the 1981 Massacre was key to understanding the connections between the Iranian government's historical atrocities and its current human rights violations.

== See also ==
- Iranian revolution
- 1988 executions of Iranian political prisoners
- Aftermath of the Iranian revolution
- Timeline of the Iranian revolution
- Islamic fundamentalism in Iran
- Human rights in the Islamic Republic of Iran
- International rankings of Iran
- Persecution of Baháʼís
- Politics of Iran
- List of modern conflicts in the Middle East
- Organizations of the Iranian revolution
- 2026 Iran massacres
- E'daam haa-ye Enqelaab-e Eslaami
