= Christopher C. Harmon =

American academic

Harmon in 2022

Christopher C. Harmon is an American author, editor and independent scholar. He is a Distinguished Fellow at the Brute Krulak Center, Marine Corps University, and Professor at the Institute for World Politics. Dr. Harmon directed the counterterrorism course at the Asia-Pacific Center for Security Studies. From 2007-2010 he was director of studies for the program on Terrorism and Security Studies at the George C. Marshall European Center for Security Studies. His expertise is in the fields of terrorism and counterterrorism, insurgency and revolutionary warfare, counter-insurgency, and international relations. Starting in 2003, Harmon lectured extensively on "how terrorist groups end," as at the Woodrow Wilson International Center for Scholars (20 March 2006); his publications in this arena date 2004 - 2014. He inaugurated the Kim T. Adamson Chair in Insurgency and Terrorism at the Marine Corps University, was for four years Horner Chair of Military Theory, and served for twelve years at Quantico as a full professor teaching subjects such as international relations, the theory and nature of war and strategy and policy. For many years he has taught at The Institute of World Politics, a graduate school of national security and international affairs, in Washington, D.C.

== Published works include these books and articles ==
- (2023) Warfare in Peacetime, Marine Corps University Press. ISBN 9798985340488
- (2021) A Citizen's Guide to Terrorism and Counterterrorism, 2nd. ed., Routledge ISBN 978-0-367-48650-1
- (2021) "The Philippines Face the New People's Army: Fifty Years in the Field," in Routledge Handbook of Democracy and Security ISBN 978-1-138-79998-1
- (2018) The Terrorist Argument: Modern Advocacy and Propaganda, (Brookings, 2018); co-authored with Dr. Randall Bowdish ISBN 978-0-8157-3218-1
- (2014) "Terrorism," Oxford Bibliographies (Military History)
- (2014) A Citizen's Guide to Terrorism and Counterterrorism, Routledge ISBN 978-0-415-70942-2
- (2012) "Spain's ETA Terrorist Group is Dying," Orbis, vol. 56 no. 4 (Fall).
- (2010) Toward a Grand Strategy Against Terrorism, (co-ed. & author) Dushkin/McGraw-Hill ISBN 978-0-07-352779-6
- (2007) Terrorism Today, 2nd ed. Routledge ISBN 978-0-415-77300-3
- (2006) "What History Suggests About Terrorism and its Future," in The Past as Prologue, Cambridge Univ. Press ISBN 978-0-521-61963-9
- (2004) "How Al Qaeda May End," Backgrounder #1760 (13 pp.)
- (2000) Terrorism Today, Frank Cass Publishers, ISBN 0-7146-4998-8
- (1991) "'Are We Beasts?' Churchill and the Moral Question of World War II Area Bombing", Newport Paper #1, Naval War College Press
