= Mohammad Ali Haj Aghaei =

Political prisoner in Iran

- Born: 1958
- Died: 24 January 2011 (aged 52–53); Evin Prison, Iran
- Cause of death: Execution by hanging

Mohammad Ali Haj Aghaei (Persian: محمدعلی حاج آقایی) was a political prisoner in Iran who was sentenced to death for co-operation with the Iranian opposition group People's Mujahedin of Iran (PMOI) and was hanged in Evin Prison on January 24, 2011, along with another political prisoner, Jafar Kazemi. His execution was widely covered by the press and brought international attention to the Human rights situation in Iran.

Haj Aghaei, who was 53 years old at the time of execution, was executed after being convicted of "Moharebeh” (fighting with God), “propaganda against the holy Islamic system,” and belonging to the MEK organization, although there were no reports that he was involved in MEK activities.

== Arrest ==
Haj Aghaei was arrested in 2009 during the massive demonstration in Tehran and was transferred to Evin prison. Former Secretary of State, Hillary Clinton, had urged the Iranian authorities to release the two activists, Mohammad Ali Haj Aghaei and JAfar Kazemi.

== See also ==
- Human rights in the Islamic Republic of Iran
- Evin Prison
