= Ashraf Rabiei =

Iranian political activist (1952–1982)

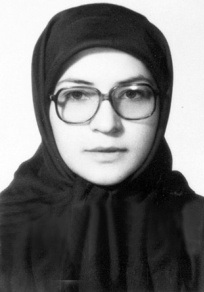
- Born: 1952; Zanjan, Iran
- Died: 8 February 1982 (aged 29–30); Tehran, Iran
- Cause of death: Shot to death
- Organization: People's Mojahedin of Iran
- Spouses: Ali-Akbar Nabavi-Nuri (m. 1975–1976) Massoud Rajavi (m. 1980–1982)

Ashraf Rabiei (Persian: اشرف ربیعی; 1952 – February 8, 1982) was an Iranian guerrilla and member of the People's Mojahedin of Iran (MEK).

While studying physics at Aryamehr University in the early 1970s, she joined the MEK. Later, she came to be regarded as the "symbol of revolutionary womanhood".

In 1975, she married Ali-Akbar Nabavi-Nuri, a fellow MEK member. Nabavi-Nuri was killed in action in 1976. She married Massoud Rajavi, leader of the MEK in summer 1980.

In 1980, she received 319,087 votes in Iran's 1980 parliamentary election. Despite official results showing them with up to 20 percent of the vote, the MEK was not able to secure seats in the provinces. In several regions, they came close to winning, prompting local authorities to abruptly shut down polling stations at the last moment.

On 8 February 1982, the Islamic Revolutionary Guard Corps raided the safe house of Rabiei in northern Tehran and after a three-hour firefight, she was killed along with other MEK members including Mousa Khiabani and his wife Azar Rezaei, among others. Her son Mostafa survived and was later exiled to Paris.

The MEK named its Camp Ashraf, established in Iraq in 1986 during the Iran–Iraq War, after her.

== Electoral history ==
Year	Election	Votes	%	Rank	Notes
1980	Parliament	390,683	18.3	46th	Lost
