= Mousa Khiabani =

Iranian political activist and militant (1947–1982)

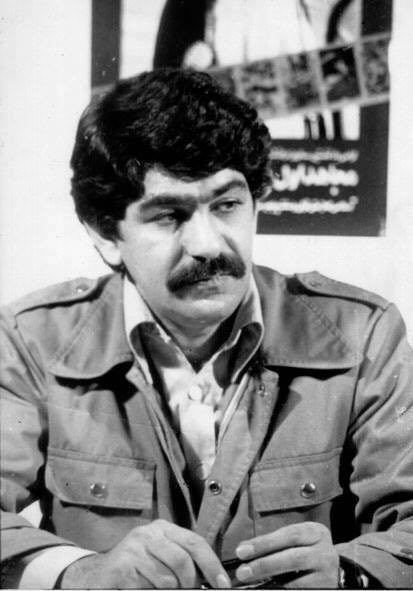
- Born: 1947; Tabriz, Imperial State of Iran
- Died: 8 February 1982 (aged 34–35); Tehran, Iran
- Education: University of Tehran
- Political party: People's Mojahedin of Iran
- Spouse: Azar Rezaei (m. 1980–1982)

Mousa Nasiroghli Khiabani (Persian: موسی نصیر اوغلی خیابانی, romanized: Musā Naṣir-uḡli Ḵiābāni; 1947 – 8 February 1982) was an Iranian dissident political leader and senior member of the People's Mojahedin of Iran (MEK) and the commander of its armed wing from 1979 to 1982, when he was killed in action. "Khiabani" was his revolutionary alias, while his real surname was Nasiroghli.

Khiabani has been described as "Massoud Rajavi's right-hand man" and "second-in-command".

According to Ervand Abrahamian, along with Rajavi, Khiabani acted as the organization's post-1979 spokesman and was viewed as equal to Rajavi by outsiders, despite the fact that MEK insiders knew Rajavi to be pre-eminent.

== Life and career ==
Khiabani was born into a merchant family in Tabriz in 1947, he frequently participated in the Moharram rituals. He studied physics at the University of Tehran. Trained in guerilla warfare in Lebanon, he was sentenced to life imprisonment in 1972 for his activities with MEK, however he was released in 1979 following the Iranian Revolution.

He ran for a seat in the 1979 constitutional and 1980 parliamentary elections from his hometown, however he was defeated.

As Khomeini's autocracy consolidated after 1980, the MEK allied with President Abolhassan Banisadr to wage anti-Khomeini protests, such as the 1981 Khordad 30 protests. Following the violent suppression of street protests, the MEK transitioned to bombing campaigns reminiscent of the Pahlavi era, assassinating key figures of the Khomeini regime, including Mohammad Beheshti, Mohammad-Ali Rajai, and Mohammad-Javad Bahonar. Because Rajavi had fled into exile with Banisadr, these bombing campaigns were carried out under the overall command of Khiabani, the organization's second-in-command and the highest-ranking leader remaining inside the country.

On 8 February 1982, the Iranian Revolutionary Guard Corps (IRGC) raided Khiabani's safe house in northern Tehran and after a three-hour shootout, Khiabani, his wife Azar Rezaei, and fellow MEK member Ashraf Rabiei were killed, among others.

In 1985, following the exiled MEK's degeneration into a cult under Massoud Rajavi's autocratic rule, a faction led by Parviz Yaqubi, the brother-in-law of Rajavi's former wife, Ashraf Rabiei, broke away in protest to establish the "People's Mojahedin Following Musa's Road."

Party political offices
Vacant Title last held by Bahram Aram	Military commander of the People’s Mojahedin Organization of Iran; 1979–1982	Succeeded by Ali Zarkesh
