= National Council of Resistance of Iran =

Political alliance aiming to overthrow the Islamic Republic of Iran

National Council of Resistance of Iran شورای ملی مقاومت ایران
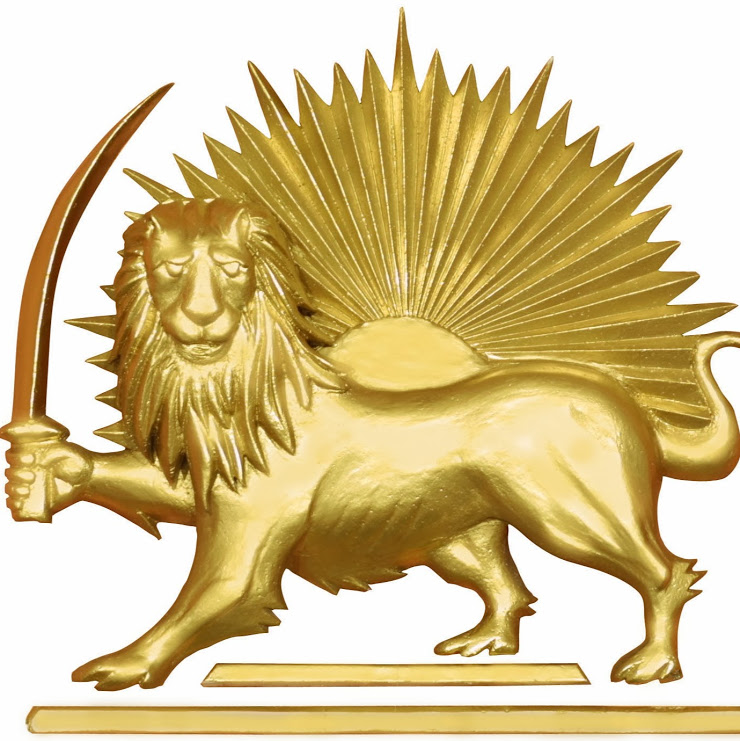
- The Golden Lion and Sun was adopted as the emblem of the NCRI in 1993
- Abbreviation: NCRI
- Spokesperson: Alireza Jafarzadeh
- President-elect: Maryam Rajavi
- Founder: Massoud Rajavi and Abolhassan Banisadr
- Founded: 20 July 1981; 45 years ago
- Headquarters: Paris, France; Tirana, Albania
- Ideology: Liberalism (Iranian); Anti-Islamic Republic; Anti-monarchism
- Anthem: Ey Iran

Party flag
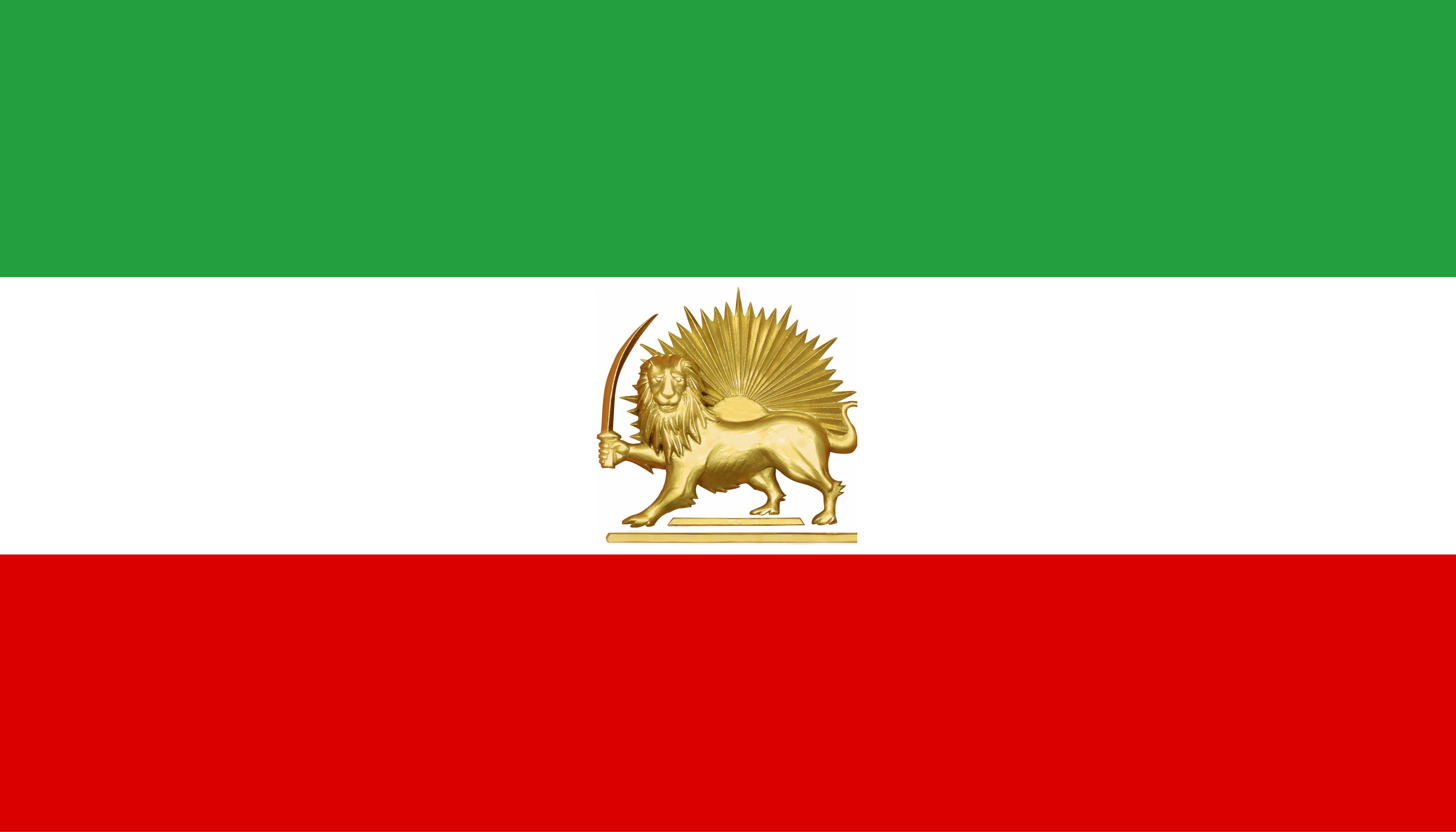

Website
- ncr-iran.org

The National Council of Resistance of Iran (NCRI; Persian: شورای ملی مقاومت ایران, romanized: Šurā-ye melli-e moqāvemat-e Īrān) is an Iranian political organization based in France and Albania. It was founded by Massoud Rajavi and Abolhassan Banisadr in 1981, and is currently led by Maryam Rajavi. It is the longest active political alliance in Iranian history.

The NCRI is a coalition of Iranian dissident groups led by the People's Mojahedin Organization of Iran (MEK), which advocates for the overthrow of the Islamic Republic of Iran. It describes itself as an independent parliament-in-exile prepared to establish a democratic provisional government in Iran upon the fall of its current government. The organization is often described by academics and journalists as the political or diplomatic wing of the MEK.

In 2002, the NCRI exposed the existence of an undisclosed uranium enrichment facility in Natanz, leading to concerns about Iran's nuclear program. It was listed by the U.S. government as a Foreign Terrorist Organization in 1997, but was removed from this list in 2012, along with the MEK.

== Political platform ==
- Elections founded on the concept of "universal suffrage".
- Fostering a diverse political system with "respect for individual freedoms", "freedom of expression", and "free assembly".
- Eradicating the death penalty.
- Separating religious institutions (mosques) from the state, while forbidding religious discrimination.
- Complete gender equality for women in Iran.
- Modernizing the justice system in Iran, abolishing Sharia law, and introducing reforms that provide new legal protections.
- Committing to the "Universal Declaration of Human Rights" (and "autonomy for Iranian Kurdistan")
- Implementing measures that protect "investment and employment", "private property", and help bolster a market economy.
- Foreign policy grounded on the concept of "peaceful coexistence" with other nations.
- Rejecting the pursuit and development of nuclear weapons.
- Rejecting the possession and development of "weapons of mass destruction".

== History ==
=== Early years ===
Abolhassan Banisadr rose to the Iranian presidency with the support of Ayatollah Ruhollah Khomeini in 1979. Banisadr believed the clerics should not govern Iran directly, and became embroiled in a power struggle with Islamic hardliners, and was subsequently impeached by the Majlis on 17 June 1981. Protests against Banisadr's impeachment, such as those on 20 June 1981, were met with violence, and Banisadr, along with his allies in the MEK, including Massoud Rajavi, fled to Paris on 29 June 1981. Khomeini's regime had surpassed Mohammad Reza Pahlavi's dictatorship in several ways, including the dismantling of women's and minority rights, media censorship, and ban on opposition papers. Exiled in Paris, Massoud Rajavi and Banisadr founded the NCRI. The coalition was also joined by the National Democratic Front and the Kurdistan Democratic Party of Iran and the Minority Fedaian.

The founding of the NCRI allowed Massoud Rajavi to assume leadership within the anti-Islamic Republic faction, and put the MEK in a leading position to build ideological structures for a prospective future government to replace the Islamic Republic. In January 1983, Deputy Prime Minister of Iraq Tariq Aziz and NCRI President Massoud Rajavi signed a peace plan "based on an agreement of mutual recognition of borders as defined by the 1975 Algiers Agreement". According to James Piazza, this peace initiative became the NCRI's first diplomatic act as a "true government in exile". In 1983, elements united with NCRI began to depart the alliance because of conflicts with the MEK, particularly its alliance with Iraq. On 24 March 1983, Banisadr officially left the council.

In 1986, the French government closed down NCRI headquarters in Paris to improve relations with the Islamic Republic. Rajavi and the NCRI moved their main operations to Baghdad, Iraq.

=== Under Maryam Rajavi leadership ===
In 1993, Maryam Rajavi, the spouse of Massoud Rajavi and then General Secretary of the MEK, became president-elect of the NCRI.

In 1993, NCRI representative Mohammad Hossein Naghdi was killed in Italy by assassins. As a result, the European Parliament issued a condemnation of political murder against the Islamic Republic of Iran.

In 2002, the NCRI exposed nuclear facilities in Natanz and Arak in Iran. Iran was then declared "in breach of the Treaty on the Non-Proliferation of Nuclear Weapons", which began to limit the nuclear program in Iran.

In 2003, French police rounded up 167 PMOI sympathizers and placed 24 people under formal investigation, including the NCRI president Maryam Rajavi. In 2014, after an 11-year probe, the French courts dropped the charges.

The NCRI has in the past three decades recorded and reported human rights violations in Iran to UN Special Rapporteurs, the UN High Commissioner for Human Rights, Amnesty International and other international human rights organisations.

In June 2020, a majority of members of the US House of Representatives backed a "bipartisan resolution" supporting Maryam Rajavi and the NCRI's "call for a secular, democratic Iran" while "condemning Iranian state-sponsored terrorism". The resolution, backed by 221 lawmakers (including Louie Gohmert and Sheila Jackson Lee), gave support to the Rajavi's 10-point plan for Iran's future (which include "a universal right to vote, market economy, and a non-nuclear Iran") while calling on the prevention of "malign activities of the Iranian regime's diplomatic missions." A NCRI representative said that "The fact that out of ten diplomats or agents of the Iranian regime expelled or jailed in Europe and the U.S. for terror plots over the past two years, eight of them were tied to operations against our movement, is a vivid testimony that the NCRI is the alternative to this regime." The resolution also called on the U.S. to stand "with the people of Iran who are continuing to hold legitimate and peaceful protests" against the Iranian government.

In February 2021, Belgian court in Antwerp sentenced Assadollah Assadi, who worked at the Iranian embassy in Vienna, to 20-year jail term for plotting to bomb a rally of NCRI outside Paris in June 2018. He was arrested in Germany in June 2018. A Belgian couple of Iranian origin was also arrested with explosives and a detonator. A fourth man, Belgian-Iranian poet Merhad Arefani, was arrested in Paris and accused of being an accomplice. All three were convicted in a Belgian court for taking part in the plot and given jail terms of 15 to 18 years.

The NCRI has been described as a parliament-in-exile comprising more than 450 members, including representatives of ethnic and religious minorities such as Kurds and Armenians. Maryam Rajavi has been designated as its president-elect for a transitional period following the fall of the clerical government.

During the 2025–2026 Iranian protests, NCRI representatives urged that "real steps" be taken toward democracy in Iran.

=== Provisional Government of the National Council of Resistance of Iran ===
Rajavi proclaimed the formation of a "Provisional Government of the National Council of Resistance of Iran" on 28 February 2026 with herself as "president-elect" following the commencement of Israeli–United States strikes on Iran. The Friends of a Free Iran group in the European Parliament welcomed the formation of a provisional government.

== Global reception ==
The NCRI has received support from US officials including Tom Ridge, Howard Dean, Michael Mukasey, Louis Freeh, Hugh Shelton, John Bolton, Bill Richardson, James L. Jones, Rudy Giuliani, Joe Lieberman, Edward G. Rendell, Brian Binley, and Thomas McInerney. Some of its supporters have been paid to speak at NCRI events. The group actively lobbies in the US Congress and the EU parliament, despite official denial.

The NCRI, along with the MEK is regarded by the Islamic Republic of Iran and Iraq as a terrorist organization, and was classified as a Foreign Terrorist Organization by the United States, alleging that the NCRI "is not a separate organization, but is instead, and has been, an integral part of the MEK at all relevant times" and that the NCRI is "the political branch" of the MEK. On September 28, 2012, the US State Department formally removed MEK from its list of terrorist organizations in a decision made by then-Secretary of State Hillary Clinton, ahead of an October 1 deadline set by a US appeals court.

Dick Armey suggested that the State Department wrongly included MEK in the terrorist list from the beginning. Alireza Jafarzadeh was its official representative in the US until the Washington office was closed by the US State Department in 2002 on the grounds that it was only a front group for the MEK by then listed as a terrorist organisation in the US. It has been alleged that the inclusion of NCRI and MEK in the list was a token offered to the Iranian government rather than based on the facts of the matter. According to the Wall Street Journal "Senior diplomats in the Clinton administration say the MEK figured prominently as a bargaining chip in a bridge-building effort with Tehran." The Journal added that: In 1997, the State Department added the MEK to a list of global terrorist organizations as "a signal" of the US's desire for rapprochement with Tehran's reformists, said Martin Indyk, who at the time was assistant secretary of state for Near East Affairs. President Khatami's government "considered it a pretty big deal," Indyk said.

The European Union in May 2004 implied that NCRI is part of the People's Mujahedin of Iran and excluded the NCRI itself from a list of organisations considered to be terrorist organisations, including the People's Mujahedin of Iran "minus the National Council of Resistance of Iran" on its list of terrorist organisations. On January 26, 2009, EU Council of Ministers agreed to remove the MEK from the EU terror list. The group said it was the outcome of a "seven-year-long legal and political battle". The European Union had previously listed the MEK on its list but excluded the NCRI itself from the list of organizations considered to be terrorist organizations. According to some sources, it has an active global network.

The Middle East department of the Foreign and Commonwealth Office (FCO) in the United Kingdom stated in early 2006 that it is widely understood that "Iran's [nuclear] program, which was kept secret from the IAEA for 18 years, became public knowledge largely because of revelations of the NCRI, and this led to heightened international concern." At the same time Michael Axworthy, former head of the Iran section at the FCO, claimed that the NCRI is a "tightly disciplined front organization for the MEK" and deemed them unreliable.

In a meeting at the Council of Europe in April 2006, Maryam Rajavi elaborated on the movement's vision for a future Iran and presented a Ten Point Plan for Future Iran, according to the organisation's website. The plan has been supported by British MPs, some arguing that it is a potential programme that "would transform Iran" since it calls for the abolition of the death penalty, the creation of a modern legal system and the independence of judges. At a debate on the human rights situation in Iran in the House of Lords on December 8, 2016, Lord Alton of Liverpool said, "The manifesto says: Cruel and degrading punishments will have no place in the future Iran. Madam Rajavi would end Tehran's funding of Hamas, Hezbollah and other militant groups and is committed to peaceful coexistence, relations with all countries and respect for the United Nations charter."

The NCRI styles itself as a parliament-in-exile representing the Iranian opposition, with Maryam Rajavi serving as its president-elect and advocating for the creation of a democratic Islamic republic in Iran. According to a RAND report, the organization launched campaigns to highlight human rights abuses in the Islamic Republic and provided intelligence on state activities to Western governments. It communicated its positions through dedicated media outlets, including newspapers and a radio station.

On 31 July 2025, Maryam Rajavi proposed the overthrow of the Islamic Republic and the establishment of a democratic, non-nuclear state during a rally in Rome organized by NCRI. The event drew support from notable Western political figures.

== See also ==
- Iranian opposition
- Reza Pahlavi
- Iran Prosperity Project

== Bibliography ==
- Abrahamian, Ervand (1989). Radical Islam: The Iranian Mojahedin. I. B. Tauris. ISBN 978-1-85043-077-3.
- Clark, Mark Edmond (2016). "An Analysis of the Role of the Iranian Diaspora in the Financial Support System of the Mujahedin-e-Khalq". In Gold, David (ed.). Terrornomics. Routledge. pp. 66–76. doi:10.4324/9781315612140. ISBN 978-1-317-04590-8.
- Cohen, Ronen (2009). The Rise and Fall of the Mojahedin Khalq, 1987-1997: Their Survival After the Islamic Revolution and Resistance to the Islamic Republic of Iran. Sussex Academic Press. ISBN 978-1-84519-270-9. Archived from the original on 2023-05-29.
- Goulka, Jeremiah; Hansell, Lydia; Wilke, Elizabeth; Larson, Judith (2009). The Mujahedin-e Khalq in Iraq: A Policy Conundrum (PDF) (Report). RAND corporation. Archived (PDF) from the original on 22 February 2016.
- Katzman, Kenneth (2001). "Iran: The People's Mojahedin Organization of Iran". In Benliot, Albert V. (ed.). Iran: Outlaw, Outcast, Or Normal Country?. Nova Science Publishers. ISBN 978-1-56072-954-9. Archived from the original on 2023-06-09.
- Keddie, Nikki R. (2006). Modern Iran: Roots and Results of Revolution. Yale University Press. ISBN 978-0-300-12105-6.
- Piazza, James A. (October 1994). "The Democratic Islamic Republic of Iran in Exile". Digest of Middle East Studies. 3 (4): 9–43. doi:10.1111/j.1949-3606.1994.tb00535.x.
