= 20 June 1981 Iranian protests =

Protests in Iran

20 June, 1981 Iranian protests
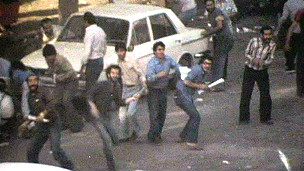
- Date: 20 June 1981; 16:00
- Location: Tehran, Isfahan, Urmia, Shiraz, Arak, Ahvaz, Bandar Abbas (Iran)
- Caused by: Opposition to the Islamic Republic, Impeachment of president Abolhassan Banisadr
- Methods: Demonstrations, riots
- Status: Protest quelled

Parties
PMOI	(Iran) Islamic Republic

Lead figures
Massoud Rajavi; Abolhassan Banisadr	(Iran) Ruhollah Khomeini

Casualties
- Deaths: 5,000–10,000 (including subsequent executions)
- Injuries: 156–200

The 20 June 1981 Iranian protests, also known as the 30 Khordad protests, was a one-day anti–Islamic Republic protest organized by the People's Mujahedin of Iran on 20 June 1981 in various Iranian cities in response to the impeachment of the then president Abolhassan Banisadr.

== Background ==
On June 14, 1980, Ayatollah Khomeini initiated an order aimed to "purify" higher education by removing Western, liberal, and leftist elements, leading to the closure of universities, the banning of student unions, and violent occupations of campuses. Following the 1979 revolution, the MEK started to gain popularity among university students. During the Cultural Revolution in Iran, clerics imposed policies to Islamize Iranian society, including the expulsion of critical academics, the suppression of secular political groups, and the persecution of intellectuals and artists. These measures sparked large-scale protests across the country.

On the final day of the elections, Rajavi met with President Abolhassan Banisadr, complaining that the IRP and its Hezbollah supporters were systematically intimidating voters, disrupting rallies, assaulting campaign workers, and setting ballot boxes on fire. The MEK then arrived at two key conclusions: first, that they had enough popular backing to serve as an opposition to the IRP; and second, that the IRP would not allow them to operate as an opposition. The group began clashing with the ruling Islamic Republican Party while avoiding direct and open criticism of Khomeini. The MEK was in turn suppressed by Khomeini's revolutionary organizations.

In response to the impeachment of Banisadr, the MEK organized a large-scale protest against Khomeini on June 20, 1981, intending to topple the regime. Big crowds gathered in various cities, with the Tehran protest alone attracting up to 500,000 people. Leading clerics proclaimed that demonstrators would be considered "enemies of God" and face immediate execution regardless of age. This marked the beginning of the 1981–1982 Iran Massacres led by the Islamic government.

== Events ==
On 20 June 1981 protests were seen in Tehran, Isfahan, Urmia, Shiraz, Arak, Ahvaz, and Bandar Abbas. Protests in Tehran were focused in the city centre and around areas such as Enghelab street, Ferdowsi square, Moniriyeh square, Taleghani street, and Vali Asr street. The government responded swiftly.

In the area around Tehran University, 50 people were killed, 200 wounded, and 1,000 taken into custody, surpassing the intensity of most street battles during the Islamic Revolution. 23 demonstrators were also executed by firing squads, with teenage girls among those executed. From June 24 to 27, the regime executed an additional 50 people. The reported number of executions increased to "600 by September, 1700 by October, and 2500 by December." Minimum figures show 2666 executions by December, with the majority being MEK members, but with figures also including other leftist or Marxist group members; with a true figure approximated to be higher. Initially, the regime publicly displayed the bodies and took pride in declaring the execution of entire families, "including teenage daughters and 60-year-old grandmothers." A few days before the protest, Asadollah Lajevardi ordered the arrests of Massoud Rajavi and Mousa Khiabani; but the security forces could not locate them.

== Sources ==
- Katzman, Kenneth (2001). "Iran: The People's Mojahedin Organization of Iran". In Benliot, Albert V. (ed.). Iran: Outlaw, Outcast, Or Normal Country?. Nova Science Publishers. ISBN 978-1-56072-954-9. Archived from the original on 2023-06-09.
- Zabih, Sepehr (1988). The Iranian Military in Revolution and War (1st ed.). Routledge. ISBN 978-0415004763.
