= Mohammad Hossein Naghdi =

Iranian politician (1951–1993)

Ambassador of Iran in Rome, Italy
- Preceded by: Seyyed Mohammad Baqer Nasir al-Sadat Salami
- Succeeded by: Gholam Ali Heydari Khajepour

Personal details
- Born: 25 March 1951 Yazd, Imperial State of Iran
- Died: 16 March 1993 (aged 41) Piazza Elba, Rome, Italy
- Cause of death: assassination
- Party: National Council of Resistance of Iran
- Education: geology

Mohammad Hossein Naghdi (Persian: محمدحسین نقدی; 25 March 1951 – 16 March 1993) was the chargé d'affaires of the Iranian embassy in Italy, but left the embassy in March 1982, and in 1984 he assumed the role of representative for the National Council of Resistance of Iran in Italy. He was assassinated in Italy on 16 March 1993.

== Life and education ==
Mohammad Hossein Naghdi was born in 1951 in Yazd. In the late 1960s, while studying at the university, he was arrested and imprisoned multiple times for participating in student protests and supporting the Student activism. After completing his university studies, he worked as a geologist at the National Iranian Oil Company. From 1970 to 1971, he was employed by the Atomic Energy Organization of Iran. In the 1980s, he was granted a scholarship and relocated to Italy to pursue further studies at the School of Administration in Milan.

== Political activities ==
After completing his studies in Italy, he returned to Iran and was employed by the Ministry of Foreign Affairs. In 1981, he served as chargé d'affaires of the Iranian Embassy in Rome. His support for democracy, freedom, and opposition to the Khomeini Regime led him to decide to separate from the government of the Islamic Republic. On 19 April 1982, he handed over his diplomatic passport to the Italian authorities. Later, he assumed the representation of the National Council of Resistance of Iran in Italy.

He worked with Italian members of parliament and politicians to gain support for the National Council of Resistance of Iran. In one of his last actions, he obtained the support of more than 300 Italian parliamentarians for the National Council of Resistance, who issued a joint statement. He was also active in international organizations, exposing the Iranian government.

== Assassination ==
On 16 March 1993, at 9:30 a.m., while Naghdi was driving to his office in the Roman neighborhood of Monte Sacro, two unidentified men on a Vespa motorcycle armed with automatic weapons approached his car and fatally shot him.
