= Rajavi =

Rajavi is an Iranian surname. Notable people with the surname include:

- Kazem Rajavi (1934–1990), Iranian political activist in exile, brother of Massoud
- Massoud Rajavi, Secretary-General of People's Mujahedin of Iran
- Maryam Rajavi, Iranian political activist in exile, wife of Massoud
