= Iranian diplomat terror plot trial =

2020 criminal trial in Belgium

On 27 November 2020, Iranian diplomat Assadollah Assadi and three other Iranian citizens were tried in Belgium, charged with plotting to bomb a 2018 rally of National Council of Resistance of Iran, a political wing of the exiled Iranian political party People's Mujahedin of Iran in France. The trial established that Assadi had smuggled explosives from Iran and was acting on instructions of high-ranking Iranian officials. The charges included "attempted terrorist murder and participation in the activities of a terrorist group." This is the first trial where a EU country charged an Iranian official for terrorism.

On February 4, 2021, Assadi was sentenced to 20 years in jail for "attempted murder and involvement in terrorism." Nassimeh Naami was sentenced to 18 years, Amir Saadouni to 15 years, and Mehrdad Arefani to 17 years.

== Background ==
In June 2018, Belgian police intercepted 36-year-old Nassimeh Naami and 40-year-old Amir Saadouni driving from Antwerp and carrying a detonator and half-a-kilo of TATP explosives. They, 57-year-old Mehrdad Arefani, and Assadollah Assadi, 49, were charged with attempting to carry out a terrorist attack in Paris.

According to prosecutors, Assadollah Asadi "was carrying out a plan organized by Iran's intelligence services" to "blow up a rally in France of a prominent opposition group to the Iranian government."

Belgian prosecutors "showed how Assadi had brought the professionally assembled 550-gm TATP bomb on a commercial flight to Vienna from Tehran in his diplomatic bag and passed it, together with an envelope containing €22,000 (about US$27,000), to two co-conspirators. Assadi instructed them how to prime and detonate the device. French officials also blamed Iran's ministry of intelligence for the bomb plot.

Assadi denied any involvement in the foiled plot and, according to a police document, "warned authorities of possible retaliation by unidentified groups if he is found guilty."

European officials said the couple "identified Assadi as their longtime handler", while according to German officials, "Assadi professes not to know them".

France stated that it blamed Iran's intelligence ministry for the foiled bomb plot, freezing assets of two senior Iranian officials.

== Verdict ==
All four defendants (Assadollah Assadi, Amir Saadouni, Nasimeh Naami, Mehrdad Arefani) were found guilty. Assadi was sentenced to 20 years' imprisonment on 4 February 2021. Naami was sentenced to 18 years, Saadouni 15, and Arefani 17.

While Assadi was entitled to diplomatic immunity where applicable, it was deemed that he was not protected when he was arrested as he was on holiday (in Germany) outside the country where he was posted and hence protected. A lawyer for the prosecution commented after the trial "The ruling shows two things: a diplomat doesn't have immunity for criminal acts ... and the responsibility of the Iranian state in what could have been carnage."

The semi-official Iranian Students News Agency was told by a spokesman for Iran's foreign ministry in January 2021 that Assadi's diplomatic immunity had been violated and that he had been a victim of a western trap. Maryam Rajavi (head of National Council of Resistance of Iran) said the conviction was "a brilliant victory for the people and resistance of Iran and a heavy political and diplomatic defeat for the regime". She also said "the plot had been authorised at the highest levels in Iran, by the president and supreme leader and that the intelligence ministry had been given the task of carrying it out."

== Aftermath ==
In May 2021, an appeal in Belgium was dropped. In May 2023 it was announced that a prisoner swap took place in Oman where Assadi was exchanged for Belgian aid worker Olivier Vandecasteele.

== See also ==
- Iran and state-sponsored terrorism
- Kazem Rajavi
- Iranian external operations
