= Mehdi Abrishamchi =

Iranian political dissident and leading MEK and NCRI member

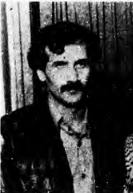
- Abrishamchi in 1980
- Born: 1947 (age 78–79); Tehran, Imperial State of Iran (present day Iran)
- Education: University of Tehran
- Organization: People's Mujahedin of Iran
- Spouses: Maryam Rajavi (m. 1980; div. 1985) Azar Khiabani (m. 1985)

Mehdi Abrishamchi (Persian: مهدی ابریشم‌چی; born in 1947 in Tehran) is an Iranian dissident political leader and high-ranking member of the People's Mojahedin Organization of Iran (MEK). Abrishamchi is also an official in the National Council of Resistance of Iran.

== Early life ==
Abrishamchi came from a well-known anti-Shah bazaari family in Tehran, and participated in the June 5, 1963, demonstrations in Iran. He became a member of Hojjatieh, and left it to join the People's Mujahedin of Iran (MEK) in 1969. In 1972 he was imprisoned for being a MEK member, and spent time in jail until 1979.

== Career ==
Shortly after the Iranian Revolution, he became one of the senior members of the MEK. Currently he's an official in the National Council of Resistance of Iran.

== Electoral history ==
| Year | Election | Votes | % | Rank | Notes |
|---|---|---|---|---|---|
| 1980 | Parliament | 390,683 | 18.3 | 46th | Lost |

== Personal life ==
Abrishamchi was married to MEK leader Maryam Rajavi from 1980 to 1985, and has since been married to Azar Khiabani (Mousa Khiabani's younger sister).

== Legacy ==
Abrishamchi credited Massoud Rajavi for saving the People's Mojahedin Organization of Iran after the "great schism".
