= Maryam Rajavi =

Iranian opposition leader (born 1953)

- مریم رجوی
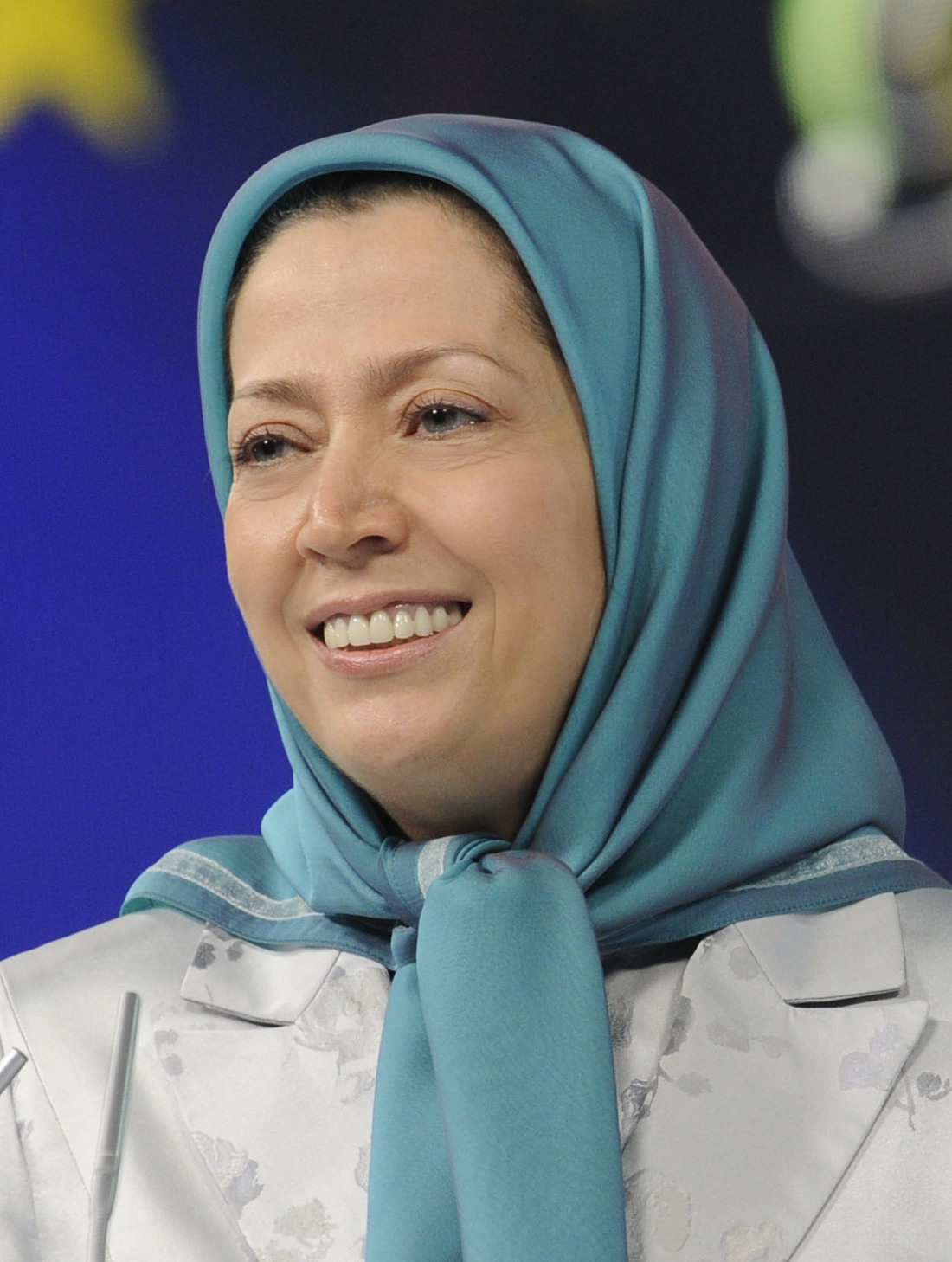
- Rajavi in 2012

President of the National Council of Resistance
- Incumbent
- Assumed office 22 October 1993
- Preceded by: Abolhassan Banisadr (Note: Banisadr who was affiliated with the National Council of Resistance of Iran from 1981 to 1984, was considered as the "President of Iran" in the claimed government by the council. The office was vacant after Banisadr.)

Co–equal Leader of the People's Mojahedin Organization of Iran (until 1993)
- Incumbent
- Assumed office 27 January 1985 Serving with Massoud Rajavi (Note: Since 2003, Massoud Rajavi has disappeared and leadership of the group has practically passed to his wife Maryam Rajavi.)
- Preceded by: Massoud Rajavi (as leader)

Secretary-General of the People's Mujahedin of Iran
- In office 8 October 1989 – 22 October 1993
- Preceded by: Massoud Rajavi
- Succeeded by: Fahimeh Arvani

Personal details
- Born: Maryam Qajar-Azodanlu; 4 December 1953 (age 72) Tehran, Iran
- Party: MEK (since 1966)
- Other political affiliations: NCRI (since 1981)
- Spouses: Mehdi Abrishamchi (m. 1980; div. 1985) Massoud Rajavi (m. 1985, dis. 2003)
- Children: 1
- Website: maryam-rajavi.com

Maryam Rajavi (Note: Persian: مریم رجوی, romanized: Maryam Rajawī) (née Qajar-Azodanlu (Note: Persian: مریم قجر عضدانلو, romanized: Maryam Qajar 'Azudānlū); born 4 December 1953) is an Iranian politician who currently serves as president of the National Council of Resistance of Iran (NCRI), an organization advocating the overthrow of the Iranian government. Rajavi advocates a progressive political program for Iran centered on democracy and human rights.

== Early life ==
Rajavi was born Maryam Qajar-Azodanlu on 4 December 1953 in Tehran, to a middle-class family of civil servants descended from the Qajar dynasty. She attended the Sharif University of Technology in Iran, earning a Bachelor of Science degree in metallurgy.

== Political career ==
Rajavi has stated that her political activism began when she was twenty-two, after her sister Narges was killed by SAVAK. Her other sister, Massoumeh, an industrial engineering student, was arrested in 1982 by Ruhollah Khomeini's regime. She was pregnant at the time and was subsequently executed by hanging after being subjected to torture. Her husband was also executed.

She served as an organizer of the anti-Shah student movement in the 1970s. In 1979, she became an official of the social section of the People's Mojahedin of Iran (PMOI/MEK), where she served until 1981. Rajavi was a parliamentary candidate in 1980. In 1982, she was transferred to Auvers-sur-Oise, Île-de-France where the political headquarters of the Mojahedin was located.

In 1985, Rajavi was made co-leader of the MEK, and was married to Massoud Rajavi in Paris. Rajavi's marriage became a symbol for women to oppose forced marriages after the 1985 ideological revolution. This was also presented by the group as a "matter of revolutionary necessity", with the appointment as co-leader reflecting the group's "thinking on the role of women in the Muslim World", and the marriage being in service of the "ideological revolution".

Between 1989 and 1993, she also served as Secretary-General On 22 October 1993, the NCRI elected Rajavi to be "Iran’s interim President" if the NCRI were to assume power in Iran. After being elected, Rajavi resigned from her other positions as co-leader of the MEK to focus on her responsibilities as President-elect for the NCRI.

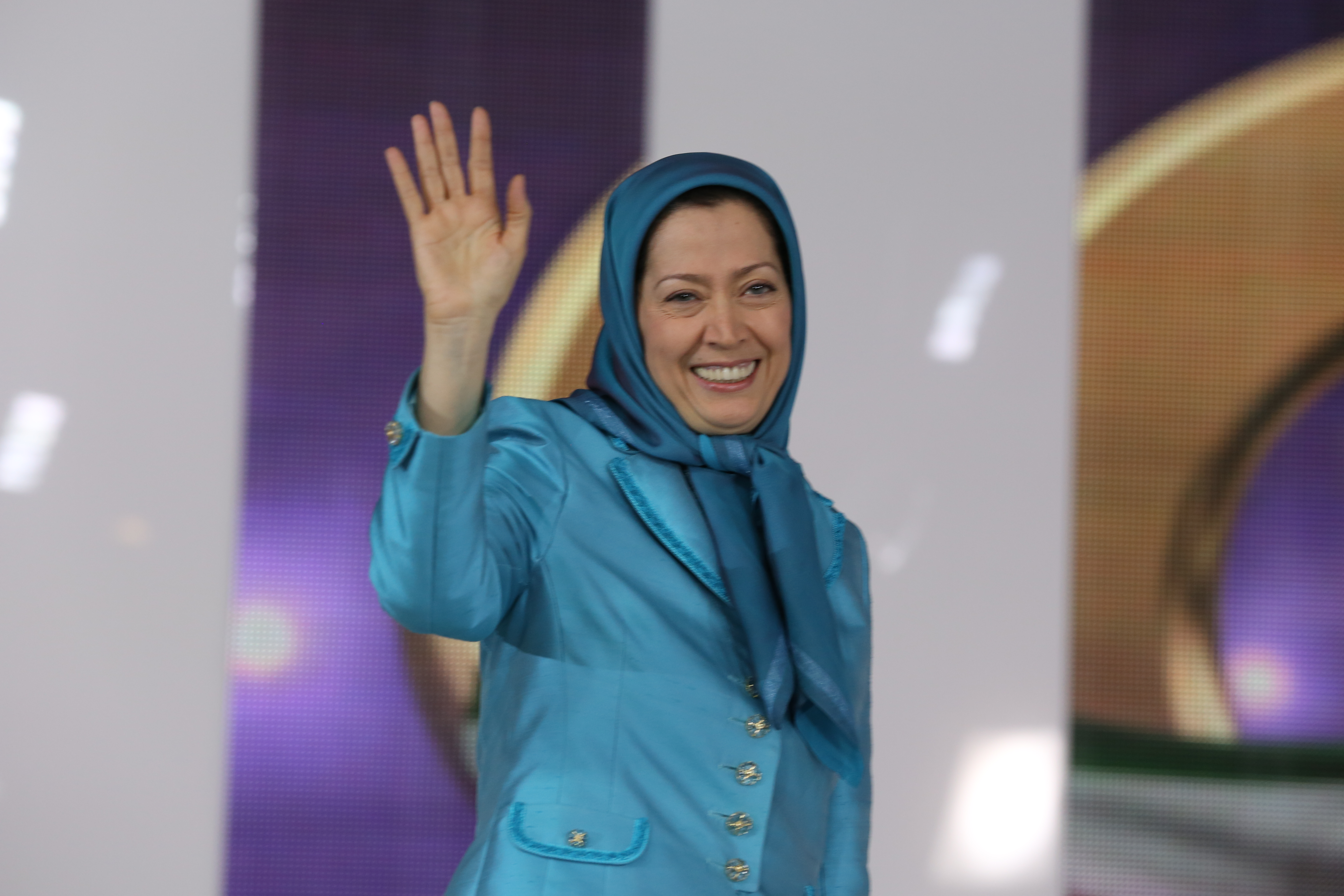
Maryam Rajavi, 2014

In October 2011, then Home Secretary, Theresa May banned Rajavi from coming to Britain in a trip where she was to "explain how women are mistreated in Iran". The high court then sued Theresa May, with Lord Carlile of Berriew (the Government's former independent reviewer of counter-terrorism laws) saying that May's decision "could be viewed as appeasing the Mullahs". In 2014, the Supreme Court of the United Kingdom dismissed an appeal from Lord Carlile of Berriew QC and others and upheld the ban, which had originally been implemented in 1997. Members of the UK House of Lords argued that the Home Secretary was "violating Article 10 (freedom of expression) of the European Convention of Human Rights (the Convention)", saying that "Home Secretary’s reasons were legally irrelevant, because they depended on the potential reaction of a foreign state which did not share the values embodied in the Convention." Rajavi is not excluded from any other European country and engages regularly with parliamentarians in the European Parliament.

Maryam Rajavi publicly met with the President of the State of Palestine Mahmoud Abbas on 30 July 2016 in Paris, France.

=== Electoral history ===
Year	Election (Constituency)	Votes	%	Rank	Result	Ref
1980	Parliament (Tehran, Rey and Shemiranat)	221,831	10.4	67th	Lost	

== Activism ==
In 1992, the EP Council supported Maryam Rajavi's advocacy for "the international community act specially in favor of women’s rights" following condemnation of human rights violations by the Iranian government.

Rajavi presented her plan at the Council of Europe in 2006, which supports complete gender equality in political and social rights and, specifically, a commitment to equal participation of women in political leadership. Her 10-point plan for the future of Iran stipulates that any form of discrimination against women would be abolished and that women would enjoy the right to choose their clothing freely. It also includes the ending of cruel and degrading punishments.

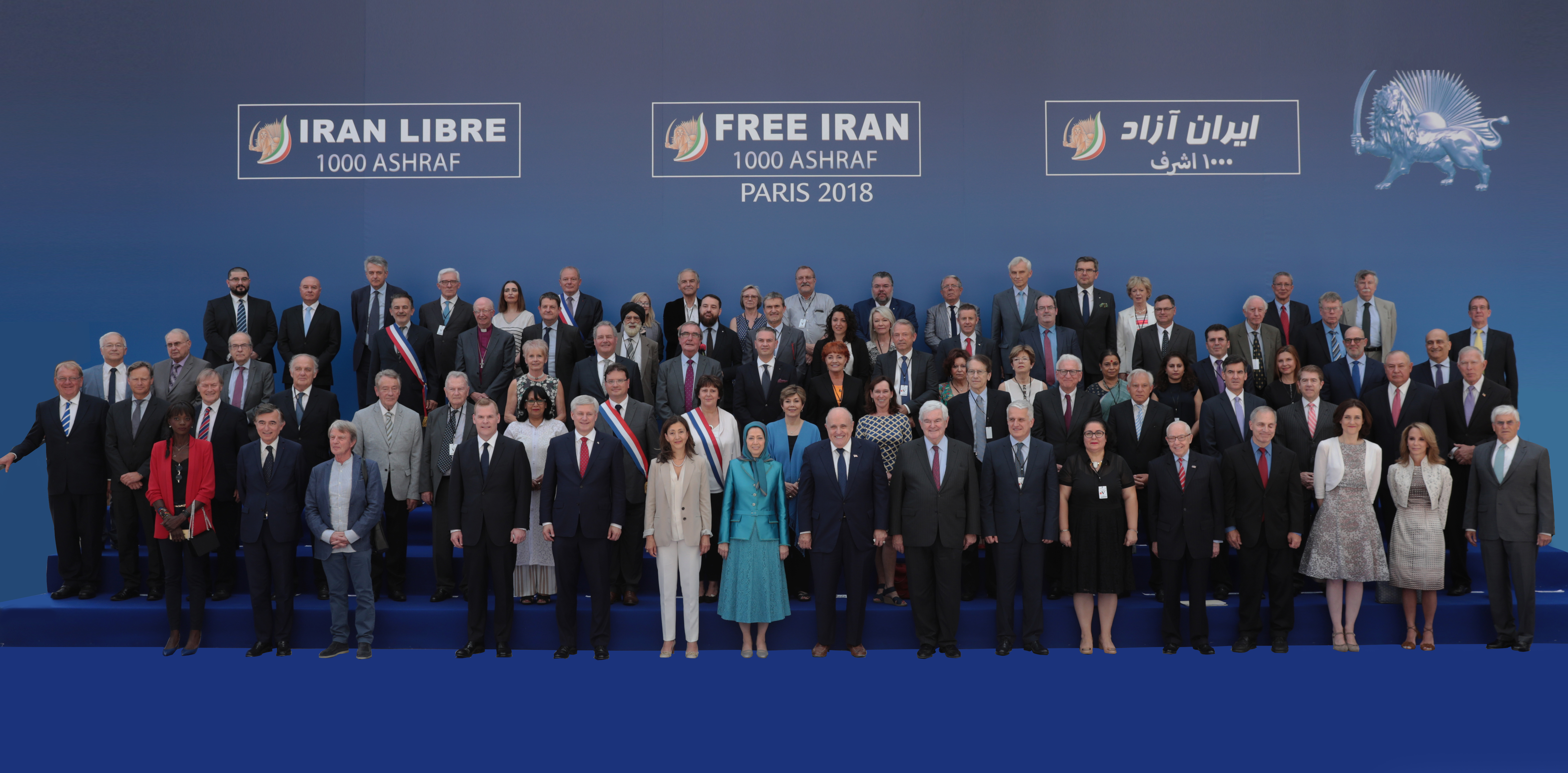
Maryam Rajavi at the Free Iran gathering in 2018

In April 2021, Maryam Rajavi endorsed resolution HR 118, which expresses "support for Iranian people's desire for a democratic republic" and "condemns 'violations of human rights and state-sponsored terrorism' by Tehran".

In July 2021, Rajavi organized a rally in Berlin to protest the election of Ebrahim Raisi as President of Iran. Rajavi called Raisi the "henchman" of the massacre of 30,000 political prisoners in 1988. She was joined in the protest by former U.S. Secretary of State Mike Pompeo, who expressed his support for Rajavi and the National Council of Resistance of Iran.

In a statement that condemned the ISIS attacks against Iran's parliament and the tomb of the Islamic Republic's founder, Rajavi stated: "ISIS's conduct clearly benefits the Iranian regime's Supreme Leader Khamenei, who wholeheartedly welcomes it as an opportunity to overcome his regime's regional and international impasse and isolation. The founder and the number one state sponsor of terror is thus trying to switch the place of murderer and the victim and portray the central banker of terrorism as a victim."

A 10-point manifesto published by Rajavi sets out a programme to transform Iran. She states her commitment to the Universal Declaration of Human Rights and to other similar international organizations. She calls for the abolition of the death penalty, the creation of a modern legal system and the independence of judges. Rajavi would end Tehran's funding of Hamas, Hezbollah and other militant groups and is committed to peaceful coexistence, relations with all countries and respect for the Charter of the United Nations. The manifesto also contains the statement that "We recognize private property, private investment and the market economy." In June 2020, a majority of members of the USA's House of Representatives backed a "bipartisan resolution" supporting Rajavi and the NCRI's "call for a secular, democratic Iran" while "condemning Iranian state-sponsored terrorism." The resolution, backed by 221 lawmakers (including Louie Gohmert and Sheila Jackson Lee), gave support to Rajavi's 10-point plan for Iran's future (which includes "a universal right to vote, market economy, and a non-nuclear Iran") while calling for the prevention of "malign activities of the Iranian regime's diplomatic missions."

Most MEK members are based in Albania. In 2024, Rajavi said in a statement that Ebrahim Raisi's death "represents a monumental and irreparable strategic blow to the mullahs' supreme leader Ali Khamenei and the entire regime, notorious for its executions and massacres".

At a similar event on 6 September 2025, Maryam Rajavi joined a crowd of tens of thousands of people, celebrating the 60th birthday of the People’s Mojahedin Organization of Iran, in Atomium plaza of Brussels. Addressing the crowd she said, “I warn Khamenei and the mullahs beware: The waves of executions will not extinguish the volcano of the Iranian people’s revolt! Imprisonment and torture will no longer work. Stoking war and destruction or imposing economic suffering on the people of Iran will not save your decaying regime! Yes, uprising and overthrow are on the way!”

Speaking to the crowd In the 6 September 2025 rally of Iranians in Brussels, Rajavi stated, "The answer to the Iranian crisis is the overthrow of the entire religious tyranny! The people of Iran are more prepared than ever! Iranian society is in a volatile state, and the only solution is the Third Option, neither appeasement nor war, but regime change by the people and their organized resistance!".

On 7 February 2026, thousands rallied in Berlin to show support for Iranians' nationwide uprising. At the rally, Rajavi said that "The message of the Iranian people and their Resistance has been and remains this: no appeasement, no war or foreign intervention, regime change and sovereignty of the republic of the people, by the people and their organised resistance".

=== 2018 rally incident ===
In 2018, Vienna-based Iranian diplomat Asadollah Asadi was tried and sentenced to 20 years in prison in a high-profile case for masterminding a terrorism plot against a rally led by Maryam Rajavi. The rally was also attended by civilians and high-profile Westerners scheduled to speak (including Rudy Giuliani, Stephen Harper, and Bill Richardson).

== Legal issues ==
=== France ===
On 17 June 2003, Rajavi was arrested by Paris Police Prefecture alongside some 150 MEK members. She and 23 other people were investigated over suspicion of links to terrorism. The group refuted the charges, stating that the case was orchestrated to appease Iran. All charges were later dropped.

=== Iraq ===
In July 2010, the Iraqi High Tribunal issued an arrest warrant for 39 MEK members, including Rajavi, "due to evidence that confirms they committed crimes against humanity" by "involvement with the former Iraqi security forces in suppressing the 1991 uprising against the former Iraqi regime and the killing of Iraqi citizens". The MEK have denied the charges, saying that they constitute a "politically motivated decision and it’s the last gift presented from the government of Nouri al-Maliki to the Iranian government".

=== Trial in absentia ===
On 29 July 2023, Iranian authorities announced that they would try Rajavi and 103 other members of MEK in absentia. The trial against both Rajavi and the 101 other MEK members commenced on 21 December 2023 at a Tehran court, and is ongoing as of April 2024. According to U.S. federal legislative information, these involve "sham trials" of dissident Iranian Resistance veterans in order to have them extradited back to Iran or "justify terror plots against them".

== Books ==
- Great March towards Freedom
- No to Compulsory Religion, No to Compulsory Government Illustrated
- Women, Islam and Fundamentalism
- Iran Will Be Free
- Key to Countering Islamic Fundamentalism

== See also ==
- List of Iranian women
- List of people from Tehran
- France–Iran relations
- Reza Pahlavi, son of the former Shah Mohammad Reza Shah Pahlavi, another leading opposition figure in the Iranian diaspora

Party political offices
Preceded by Massoud Rajavi as Leader of People's Mujahedin of Iran	Co-leader of People's Mujahedin of Iran; 1985–present Served alongside: Massoud Rajavi	Incumbent
Vacant Title last held by Abolhassan Banisadr as President of Iran in pretence	President-elect of the National Council of Resistance of Iran; 1993–present	Incumbent
Preceded by Massoud Rajavi	Secretary-General of People's Mujahedin of Iran; 1989–1993	Succeeded by Fahimeh Arvani
New title	Deputy Commander-in-Chief of the People's Mujahedin of Iran military wing 1987–1993	Vacant
