= Iranian external operations =

Military and covert operations conducted outside Iran

Iranian external operations refer to the activities conducted by the Islamic Republic of Iran in foreign countries since the 1979 Islamic Revolution. These are primarily carried out by Unit 840 of the Islamic Revolutionary Guard Corps-Quds Force (IRGC-QF), supported by the Ministry of Intelligence, and affiliated proxy networks. They employ military, intelligence, diplomatic, cyber, and proxy methods to advance Iran's foreign policy objectives, including surveillance, harassment, targeting of dissidents, and critics of the Iranian regime. These operations have a global reach, with a particular focus on the Middle East, Africa, Central Asia, North America, Latin America and Europe.

In 2025, 14 Western governments issued a joint statement publicly accusing Iran of orchestrating a wave of assassination attempts, abductions, and intimidation campaigns against individuals living in Europe and North America. Iranian officials have denied conducting such operations, dismissing such allegations as "baseless".

== Background ==
Following the Islamic Revolution of 1979, Iran became a theocratic republic. Following its mandate under article 150 of the constitution, the Islamic Revolutionary Guard Corps is tasked with protecting the regime, and spreading the Islamic Revolution worldwide. The IRGC's Unit 840, has led the execution of these operations, regularly using criminal groups to maintain plausible deniability.

== International reactions ==
Iran's external operations have raised strong concerns for many countries worldwide, especially for those were attempts of assassinations, cyber-attacks, terrorism, and proxy violence in Europe, North America, the Middle East, took place. Most common reactions are those of formal condemnations, warnings to citizens, increased diplomatic pressure. On 31 July 2025, 14 countries, including NATO members and the US, published a joint condemnation at Iran's external operations. The condemnation referred to its intelligence threats as well as plots to "Kill, Kidnap and Harass" citizens around the world. Iran's Ministry of Foreign Affairs rejected the claims as "baseless".

=== Calls for terrorist designation ===
Recent years have brought European governments and the European parliament to call for the designation of the Islamic Revolutionary Guard Corps (IRGC) as a terrorist organization. This follows the United States and Canada's stronger measure against Iran as its plot are globally uncovered. This is emphasized in Sweden's strong stand pushing for coordinated terrorist listings to improve law enforcement and counterterrorism responses across the European Union.

=== Sanctions and counter measures ===
The United States and its allies have increased sanctions against entities and individuals linked to Iran's external operations, including criminal proxies such as the Foxtrot Network in Sweden.

British, German and French law enforcement and intelligence agencies have increased their efforts to expose and prevent Iranian plots including surveillance, assassination attempts and cyber intrusions against dissident, Jewish and Israeli targets.

== Europe ==
Iran has extended the use of proxies into Europe, by outsourcing its operations to European criminal networks, with the frequency of actions increasing since 2019. These actions include assassinations, kidnapping, espionage and surveillance, targeting Iranian dissidents, Jews and Israeli-affiliated institutions.

=== France ===
In recent years, Iranian criminal actions in France have increased. These efforts are aimed at dissidents, Jews, Israelis, and political opponents. Iran employs domestic criminal groups, such as drug dealers and gangs, to carry out these attacks while maintaining plausible deniability. This was supported by an 84 report of the France 2050 think tank, stating that Iran is secretly trying to influence and weaken France and other Western countries by using political pressure, spying operations, and ties with Islamist groups. It claims the IRGC leads these efforts, hiring criminal gangs to threaten or attack Iranian opponents living in Europe and carrying out plots and surveillance in France. The study also says the IRGC is working with the Muslim Brotherhood to boost pro-Palestinian protests, helping Iran present itself as a major force in regional conflicts after October 7.

==== 1991 assassination of Shapour Bakhtiar ====
In 1991, Shapour Bakhtiar and his secretary were murdered in his home in Suresnes, France, by agents of the Islamic Republic of Iran.

==== 2018 Paris Area Bomb Plot ====
In 2018, European intelligence discovered that Vienna-based diplomat Assadolah Assadi planned to bomb a large Iranian opposition rally near Paris. He passed explosives and €22,000 to two Belgian nationals of Iranian origin who were intended to perform the attack. Assadi was arrested and sentenced in 2021 to a 20-year prison in Belgium.

==== "Sunflowers Case" ====
Mehrez Ayari, a French-Tunisian with a criminal record, was arrested for a 2022 murder in Val-d’Oise. He was later linked to the attempted assassination of former EU lawmaker Alejo Vidal-Quadras in Madrid in November 2023. Ayari had ties to criminal groups in France and Europe and was reportedly recruited by Iran to perform overseas killing.

==== "Simay Azadi" attack ====
On 31 May 2023, Simay Azadi, an Iranian opposition media center in Saint‑Ouen‑l’Aumône near Paris was attacked by Molotov cocktails and gunfire. On 11 and 13 June, gasoline containers were left outside the offices. French authorities stated these actions were performed by criminals hired by the Iranian government.

==== Marco Polo operation ====
The Marco Polo operation refers to a counterterrorism investigation conducted both in France and Germany revealing an Islamic Revolutionary Guard Corps (IRGC) cell accused of plotting attacks targeting Jewish individuals, Israeli-linked businesses, and associated targets in Europe.

==== Iran's drug trafficking network ====
Bruno Retailleau, the French Interior Minister, stated in June 2025 that Iran has contracted drug traffickers to perform operations in France.

==== 2026 Paris foiled bomb attack ====
On 28 March 2026 amid the Iran war, a foiled bomb attack outside of a Bank of America in Paris was linked to Islamic Republic-linked proxy operatives.

=== Germany ===
According to several sources, Iranian involvement in German crime has become a serious security issue. Iranian intelligence agencies employ domestic criminal groups to spy on, threaten, or attack Jews, Israelis, and political dissidents.

==== 1992 assassination of Fereydoun Farrokhzad ====
In March 2025, Mohsen Rafiqdoost, former Minister of the Islamic Revolutionary Guard Corps, admitted that the IRGC had paid Basque separatists to assassinate dissidents abroad, including the 1992 assassination of Fereydoun Farrokhzad, as part of the chain murders of Iran.

==== 2021 synagogue attacks ====
In 2021 Iran used the German Hells Angels group and their leader Ramin Yektaparast, a dual German-Iranian national to execute two synagogue attacks in Bochum and Essen.

==== 2025 plot to target Jews and Israelis ====
In July 2025, the German and Danish authorities have disrupted a plot by the Quds Force to target Jewish individuals and institutions in Berlin. Danish citizen (Ali S.), of Afghan origin was arrested on suspicion of carrying out surveillance of potential targets and extradited to Germany. He was convicted of "preparing an assassination and aggravated arson" and sentenced to eight years and six months in prison, after another plotter, an Afghan national, was convicted.

==== German counter measures ====
German and French police have discovered and prevented several Iranian plots, including murder and arson attacks on Jewish individuals and groups through intelligence efforts. Suspected Iranian agents and their affiliates have been arrested. A 2025 report issued by the German domestic intelligence agency (BfV), claims as rise in harassment cases of Iranians living in Germany by Iranian security services, including attempts to spy on them and other exiles. This brough a set up of a special 24/7 hotline in 2024 for reporting anything linked to terrorism and espionage, with reports concerning Iran are on the rise in recent months.

=== United Kingdom ===
Since the late 2010s, British intelligence and security officials have identified an increase in Iran's involvement in the UK through criminal networks.

==== "The Wedding" plot ====
In 2022, the IRGC aimed to assassinate two Iranian journalists in London, who were affiliated with Iran International, a Persian-language news channel critical of the Iranian regime. Sima Sabet and Fardad Farahzad were targeted in November 2022 by Unit 840 (a secretive special operations unit within the IRGC-QD), codenamed "the bride" and "the groom". The plot was uncovered by a double agent, and ultimately failed.

==== 2024 stabbing of Pouria Zeraati ====
In 2024, journalist Pouria Zeraati was attacked and stabbed by several men as he left his London residence, fueling concerns that the Iranian government was involved.

==== 2025 attempt to attack the Israeli embassy in London ====
In May 2025, UK police arrested five individuals, including four Iranian nationals, who were suspected of planning an attack on the Israeli embassy in London. The arrests took place during coordinated raids in London, Swindon, Stockport, Rochdale, and Manchester, as part of a major counter-terrorism operation. According to former intelligence officials and security sources, the suspects are believed to be linked to Unit 840.

==== 2025−2026 Iran-linked bots shutdown ====
During January 2026, as Iran imposed its longest internet shutdown to date, multiple pro-Scottish independence accounts on X (formerly Twitter) went silent. This came in response to nationwide protests as a means to cut off global internet access to suppress dissent and control information flows. This was very similar to the 2025 Internet blackout in Iran, where the matching accounts also went silent. Back in 2025, cybersecurity analysts and UK officials linked those accounts to Iran.

==== British counter measures ====
Since 2022, MI5 and the police have stopped at least 20 Iranian linked plots in the UK. Intelligence suggests that Iran funded domestic criminal groups to perform violence and espionage. MI5 chief Ken McCallum has vowed to give his “fullest attention to the risk of an increase in, or broadening of, Iranian state aggression in the UK” A 2025 report issued by UK counter terrorism police states that schoolchildren have been investigated and arrested over suspected involvement in espionage, arson, and other criminal acts. These teenagers were reportedly contacted online or through existing criminal networks. This Modus Operandi is known to be used by Iran.

In August 2025, it was reported that Iran's IRGC have approached the Taliban in request to obtain a leaked list of MI6 assets and 25,000 Afghans who aided UK forces. Later in August a new report showed that Iran is using a new strategy aimed to overwhelm UK security services. The method is to launch high volume and low-cost, deniable plots in order to exhaust MI5 and police resources rather than achieving real success. This is based on a belief that the UK won't increase its budget on security. Sources show that MI5 has already had to move staff away from counter terrorism, in order to deal with more threats from countries like Iran, Russia, and China, all while facing budget cuts and reduced funding for prevention programs. According to sources Iran views the UK as its main Western enemy and hopes that by creating a big enough security crisis, it can force Britain into negotiations.

On 20 August, 2025 the United Kingdom announced its sanctions on Iran's oil magnate Hossein Shamkhani, as well as four companies operating in the shipping, petrochemical and financial sectors. These sanctions were issued following the networks hostile activities and efforts to destabilize the UK and other countries, linking back to the Iranian government. According to the reports, Shamkhani was sanctioned by the US last month.

A December 2025 MI5 report, revealed how people connected to the IRGC and other Iranian government groups have continued to threaten people in the UK. They have targeted dissidents, journalists, exiles and Israelis, using spying, cyberattacks and, more recently, direct threats to harm them. In mid December two British-Lebanese men appeared in a London court charged with membership in the banned Iran backed group Hezbollah and with attending terrorism training camps. One of the men is additionally accused of assisting in buying components for drones. One defendant, Annis Makki, 40, faces multiple charges, including attending a Hezbollah training camp at the Birket Jabbour airbase in Lebanon in 2021, involvement in the preparation of terrorist acts, membership in Hezbollah, and expressing support for both Hezbollah and the banned Palestinian militant group Hamas.

On 6 March, 2026, during the 2026 Iran war. British police arrested four men under the National Security Act accused, of spying for Iran. According to reports Counter-terror officials arrested 4 men, one Iranian and 3 others with dual British, Iranian national. The arrests came as part of an ongoing investigation.

According to a 2026 report by The Telegraph UK authorities believe that Iran has attempted to exploit small-boat migrant crossings to covertly insert suspected intelligence operatives into Britain. The report states that officials, using enhanced surveillance methods including drones and watchtowers, have intercepted several individuals allegedly connected to Iranian state networks, raising concern that people smuggling routes are being used for espionage in addition to illegal migration. The report's claims are attributed to unnamed officials and sources described as familiar with the matter. Another investigation by it concluded that the Iranian government operates smuggling routes into the UK with officials in Tehran reportedly regarding these routes as a strategic tool. The operation is led by Unit 700 the smuggling and logistics arm of the Quds Force, which Britain sanctioned in 2024. Unit 700 specialises in moving weapons and equipment to Iranian backed militias. According to the report an Iranian official stated the country's armed forces have influenced over the routes and have people in London awaiting instructions and people-smugglers working on the Continent said the Iranian regime facilitated passage to Britain for migrants at Calais in exchange for favours after they settled in England.

==== 2026 London antisemitic attacks ====
On 23 March 2026 amid the Iran war, an Iranian-linked militant group claimed responsibility for the arson of Jewish ambulances in northern London.

On 29 April 2026, two Jewish men were stabbed in Golders Green, London; the Iran-linked Harakat Ashab al-Yamin al-Islamia group claimed responsibility for the attack.

=== Belgium ===
In July 2025 Belgian-Iranian MP Darya Safai revealed that Belgian security agencies warned her of a possible plot by the Iranian regime to abduct her through Turkey and transfer her to Tehran. This alleged plan is thought to be linked to her push for officially listing Iran's Revolutionary Guard Corps (IRGC) as a terrorist organization in the Belgian parliament. She has been advised not to travel to Turkey due to the threat.

=== Netherlands ===
On 20 March 2026 amid the Iran war, the Netherlands tightened security for Iranian dissidents after a man of Iranian descent who is critical of the Islamic Republic was ambushed and shot at his home in Schoonhoven; a 27-year-old man was later arrested in Dortmund, Germany in connection with the shooting.

=== Denmark ===
Iran has an ongoing presence in Denmark focused mainly on intelligence gathering and monitoring and countering dissidents and regime opponents. In 2018 Denmark accused Iran for plotting to assassinate activists linked to the Arab Struggle Movement for the Liberation of Ahvaz (ASMLA). In 2024 Iran was behind the attack on the Israeli embassy in Copenhagen.

=== Italy ===
A recent investigation report published by Linkiesta in July 2025 demonstrates the existence of a sophisticated Iranian intelligence and influence network based in Italy. Through cultural diplomacy and academic cooperation backed by over €1 million in funding, Tehran uses a team based in its embassy in Rome to watch, pressure, and intimidate Iranian dissidents throughout Italy. This includes online and in-person surveillance and threats.

=== Sweden ===
The Swedish Security Service has confirmed that Iran uses criminal networks in Sweden to carry out violent acts against states and individuals it considers threats. The Foxtrot Network, headed by Rawa Majid acts as an Iranian proxy, targeting Israeli and Jewish groups and sites on a "target list" received from Iranian authorities. These actions include drug trafficking, arms trafficking, shootings and contract killings. Foxtrot Modus Operandi is known for recruiting minors for attacks as Swedish law prevents prosecution of those under 15 years old. Foxtrot has targeted the Israeli embassy, in the January 2024 bombing attempt and the May 2024 gunfire attack, and Elbit Systems facilities. In January 2026 it was reported that Sweden plans to lower the age of criminal responsibility from 15 to 13 in serious cases as it struggles with a growing number of children recruited into gangs to carry out violent crimes without facing serious legal repercussions.

=== Switzerland ===
==== Swiss diplomat death May 2021 ====
In 2021, a Swiss woman diplomat working at the embassy in Tehran was found dead after falling from the 17th floor of a building. The Iranian authorities stated the cause of death was suicide. However, Swiss investigations were complicated due to the absence of key organs following the initial autopsy in Iran.

==== Death of Swiss defence attaché June 2023 ====
In June 2023, a Swiss defence attaché collapsed in a Tehran hotel. He was flown back to Switzerland, dying several months later. Iranian officials attributed the death to natural causes, but the incident led the Swiss intelligence service to raise concerns over the safety of Swiss diplomats in Iran.

== Latin America ==
Iranian criminal activity has increased in intensity in Latin America. Tehran actively supports its proxy networks, such as the Lebanon-based Hezbollah, in expanding their roles in illicit financial operations, drug trafficking, and arms smuggling, while also fostering stronger ties with anti-US regimes like Cuba, Nicaragua and Venezuela. Iran maintains a close relationship with Venezuela through economic cooperation, banking arrangements, and alleged intelligence coordination. Hezbollah, Iran's primary proxy, operates from the Tri-Border Area between Paraguay, Brazil, and Argentina, a well-known hotspot for smuggling due to weak governance and minimal law enforcement.

=== Argentina ===
==== 1994 AMIA bombing ====
The AMIA Bombing was an attack carried out by Hezbollah operatives acting on Iranian orders, in which a Jewish community center in Buenos Aires was bombed, resulting in the death of 85 civilians. Argentina's courts held Iran responsible and the suspects are being tried in absentia following new 2025 legislation.

=== Colombia ===
==== Operation Cassandra ====
Colombia was the starting point for Operation Cassandra, US Drug Enforcement Administration (DEA) initiative launched in 2008 to disrupt Hezbollah's funding network by targeting its involvement in international drug trafficking and money laundering.

=== Venezuela ===
==== Quds Force operations ====
In January 2020, Juan Guaidó, President of the National Assembly of Venezuela, accused Nicolás Maduro of allowing Qasem Soleimani and his Quds Forces to incorporate their sanctioned banks and their companies in Venezuela. Guaidó also said that Soleimani "led a criminal and terrorist structure in Iran that for years caused pain to his people and destabilized the Middle East, just as Abu Mahdi al-Muhandis did with Hezbollah."

==== Ghost Flights ====
The term "ghost flights" refers to ongoing, unregistered flights between Venezuela and Iran. The flights, run mainly by the Venezuelan state airline Conviasa, have raised global attention due to the lack of records, such as passenger manifests and allegations of illicit activity.

== North America ==
Iran's activities in North America include espionage, surveillance, and threats to dissidents. It uses diplomatic and non-official operatives in order to spy on diaspora communities, in some cases attempted kidnapping and assassinations, e.g. towards journalist Masih Alinejad. Reports include assassination plots directed towards US officials like President Donald Trump, Mike Pompeo and John Bolton. Iran has conducted cyber warfare and election interference, through units including APT35 and disinformation campaigns. Iran also works with criminal groups and proxies such as Hezbollah to prepare and execute attacks. It uses fake companies, cryptocurrency, and illegal purchases of sensitive technology to evade sanctions.

=== United States ===
==== Assassination attempt on Adel al-Jubeir ====
In 2011, the IRGC-QD orchestrated an assassination attempt on Adel al-Jubeir, then the Saudi ambassador to the United States, attempting to hire operatives from the Mexican Los Zetas cartel. The Iranian-American intermediary, Manssor Arbabsiar, approached what he believed were members of Los Zetas, who were in reality, DEA informants, and offered them $1.5 million to carry out the bombing at a restaurant in Washington, D.C., at which the ambassador was expected to dine. The plot, which had it succeeded would have resulted in mass civilian casualties, was disrupted by US authorities before it could be executed. Arbabsiar was arrested and later pleaded guilty to multiple charges, revealing details that linked senior officials within the Iranian regime to the conspiracy.

==== Masih Alinejad kidnapping and assassination plots ====
In July 2021, the US Department of Justice claimed that four Iranian intelligence officials and a fifth assistant were planning to kidnap a New York-based journalist critical of Iran, named Masih Alinejad, as well as four others in Canada and the UK. The Iranian kidnapping scheme, which appears to be the first publicised case on US soil, dates back to at least June 2020. Journalist Robin Wright wrote in The New Yorker:

"According to the DOJ announcement, the plotters had identified travel routes from Alinejad's home to a Brooklyn waterfront, researched a service offering military-style speedboats for maritime evacuation out of New York, and studied sea travel from New York to Venezuela, which has close ties with the Islamic Republic. In a detailed e-mail, Kiya Sadeghi, another of the four indicted Iranian intelligence agents, even instructed the private investigators to take pictures of the envelopes in Alinejad's mailbox. The FBI stated that it had foiled Iran's scheme in the United States. 'Not on our watch,' William Sweeney, the head of New York's FBI office, said."

On 28 July 2022, a man named Khalid Mehdiyev approached Alinejad's residence in Brooklyn, looking inside the windows and attempting to open the front door. He was later stopped by New York City Police in a traffic stop. He was arrested due to driving with a suspended license. The police found a suitcase in his car containing an AK-47 assault rifle with an obliterated serial number. The rifle, manufactured by Norinco, was loaded with a round in the chamber and a magazine attached, along with a second, separate magazine and approximately 66 rounds of ammunition.

Mehdiyev, who is from Yonkers, waived his Miranda rights and told police that he was looking for an apartment. Mehdiyev, unprompted, volunteered that he did not know about a gun and claimed the suitcase was not his. On 11 August 2022, Mehdiyev was indicted on one count of possessing a firearm with an obliterated serial number. In an opinion piece for The Wall Street Journal, Alinejad quoted a special agent of the Federal Bureau of Investigation as saying, "This time their objective was to kill you." On 27 January 2023, the US Department of Justice unsealed an indictment charging Mehdiyev and two other men in a plot to assassinate Alinejad.

In 2023, Niloufar Bahadorifar was convicted for having wilfully violated sanctions and knowingly provided financial support to Iranian intelligence assets, who were in turn engaged in a plot to kidnap Masih Alinejad.

In October 2024, Iranian general Ruhollah Bazghandi, along with six other Iranian operatives, was charged in an alleged plot to kill Alinejad.

In November 2024, three other men were charged in a separate plot by the IRGC to kill Alinejad and United States president-elect Donald Trump.

On 20 March 2025, Rafat Amirov, 45, and Polad Omarov, 40, were convicted in the Southern District of NY Federal Court of numerous charges, including "murder-for-hire to kill Alinejad, conspiracy, and money laundering."

==== Amir Abbas Fakhravar assassination plot ====
In 2024 an investigation by the U.S. authorities revealed an Iranian-backed plot to assassinate Amir Abbas Fakhravar, head of the National Iranian Congress. Federal documents revealed that an IRGC operative in the U.S. had planned to kill Fakhravar's wife and child in front of him before murdering him. The plot was linked to senior IRGC Quds Force figures, including Shahram PourSafi, who remains on the FBI's most-wanted list and had actively sought Fakhravar's location. The U.S. Treasury has since sanctioned five IRGC operatives involved in similar plots against dissidents and former U.S. officials.

==== Assassination plot on Mike Pompeo ====
In June 2025, The Washington Post, citing intelligence sources, reported that Iranian operatives came close to assassinating former US Secretary of State Mike Pompeo during his 2022 visit to Paris. According to the report, the operation was part of a broader Iranian campaign to target former senior US officials involved in the 2020 killing of IRGC-QD commander Qasem Soleimani. While the plot ultimately failed, sources revealed that Iranian agents had come close to executing the plan on European soil.

==== Assassination attempt on John Bolton ====
In August 2022, the US Department of Justice charged Shahram Poursafi, a member of the IRGC, with conspiracy to assassinate former National Security Advisor John Bolton and offering up to $1 million for the killing of former Secretary of State Mike Pompeo. By late 2023, US intelligence had alerted Donald Trump's team that Iranian operatives operating within the United States included both Pompeo and Trump among their potential assassination targets.

==== 2024 assassination plot against Iranian dissidents ====
In January 2024, the US and UK sanctioned a group accused of trying to kill Iranian dissidents on foreign soil on orders from Tehran. The network was led by Naji Sharif Zindashti, a drug trafficker based in Iran, and worked under Iran's Ministry of Intelligence to perform kidnappings and murders worldwide. One of the recruits was Canadian Hells Angels member Damion Ryan, tasked with killing Iranian exiles living in the US. Ryan, who has a long criminal history, received assistance from another Canadian, Adam Pearson with the plot.

==== 2024 assassination plot by Majid Dastjani Farahani ====
On 5 March 2024, the Federal Bureau of Investigation through its Miami, Florida field office issued a public alert on a 41-year-old Iranian national and intelligence agent Majid Dastjani Farahani who was thought to be orchestrating assassination plots against U.S. officials, including former Secretary of State Mike Pompeo.

According to the FBI, Farahani is accused of recruiting individuals for various operations inside the United States, which includes lethal targeting of current and former United States Government officials as revenge for the killing of Soleimani. The report said Farahani frequently travels between Iran and Venezuela and speaks English, Spanish, and French in addition to Persian.

Farahani was already sanctioned by the Office of Foreign Assets Control of the United States Department of the Treasury in December 2023 for human rights abuses and for having acted or purported to act for or on behalf of, directly or indirectly of the Iranian Ministry of Intelligence. The Treasury Department accuses Farahani of recruiting individuals to surveil religious institutions, businesses, and other facilities in the United States as part of Iran's efforts to carry out acts of transnational repression, including rendition and lethal plots against activists, journalists, and foreign government officials.

==== Trump assassination plot ====
In November 2024, US prosecutors charged a man named Farhad Shakeri along with two assistants, reportedly working for the IRGC, for surveilling and planning to assassinate Donald Trump, the newly elected president.

==== Fatwas against Donald Trump and Benjamin Netanyahu ====
In June 2025, Ayatollah Naser Makarem Shirazi issued a fatwa against President Donald Trump and Israeli Prime Minister Benjamin Netanyahu, for what Shirazi claimed were threats against Iran's Supreme leader Ali Khamenei. The fatwa names both Trump and Netanyahu as an "Enemy of God" (mohareb) and promises rewards for "Mojaeh [warriors] in the path of Allah”. Under Iranian law anyone who is declared a mohareb faces the death penalty.

==== Fundraise for Trump's death ====
An Iranian website is running an ongoing fundraiser to provide a monetary reward for the individual who assassinates President Donald Trump.

==== Sleeper cells ====
Following the 2025 United States strikes on Iranian nuclear sites, security experts in the US issued warning concerning Iranian sleeper cells operatives are a serious threat for national security. Unlike lone attackers who act on impulse, sleeper agents train abroad, then secretly enter the country, waiting for orders based on global political events. The experts claim that these cells can execute attacks in several locations, using drones.

By 26 June 2025, U.S. Immigration and Customs Enforcement had arrested 130 and detained 670 Iranian nationals throughout the country amid heightened security concerns over Iranian sleeper cell activity and potential retaliatory terror attacks in response to the strikes.

In May 2026, it was reported that Ivanka Trump was targeted in Iran backed assassination plot, as a revenge for the killing of Iranian commander Qasem Soleimani. According to many news sources Iraqi suspect Mohammad Baqer Saad Dawood Al-Saadi who has ties to Iran-backed militias and the IRGC was arrested by authorities after they uncovered threats and reported plans involving Trump's Florida home.

=== Mexico ===
In November 2025, an unnamed US official said that Mexican authorities had thwarted an Iranian assassination plot targeting Einat Kranz Neiger, the Israeli ambassador to Mexico. The plot was allegedly initiated by an Iranian elite unit and the Iranian Revolutionary Guard Corps’ (IRGC) Quds Force. Israel's Foreign Minister thanked Mexican authorities for thwarting the plot.

== Africa ==
Iran conducts large scale criminal activities in Africa, both directly via government operations and non-direct, through proxies such as Hezbollah. These activities include terrorism, weapons smuggling, drug trafficking, money laundering and assistance to local armed groups.

=== Central African Republic ===
In 2019, Ismael Djidah, a Chadian former adviser to a rebel leader in the Central African Republic, was arrested in Chad. He was accused of helping create an armed group in Central Africa with support from Iran. United Nations investigators and Djidah himself said that Iran's Quds Force gave him money and support to form a group called "Saraya Zahraa," also known as the Zahraa Brigade. The group's goal was to carry out attacks against Western, Israeli, and Saudi targets in Africa. Djidah said he recruited 30 to 40 fighters from rebel groups in the Central African Republic and sent them to Lebanon, Iraq, and Syria to be trained in camps run by Iran. UN investigators confirmed that at least 12 of these fighters travelled to those countries for training.

=== Ethiopia ===
In early 2021, Ethiopian authorities arrested a group of 15 people for planning an attack on the United Arab Emirates (UAE) embassy in Addis Ababa. The group, led by Ali Ahmed Adaito, had weapons, explosives, and documents related to the plan. Ethiopian intelligence said the attack could have caused serious harm. A key suspect, Ahmed Ismail, was arrested in Sweden with help from Swedish and Ethiopian officials. A similar plot against the UAE embassy in Sudan was also stopped following a warning from Ethiopia. US and Israeli officials believed Iran was behind these plots as revenge for the killings of Iranian leaders Qassem Soleimani and Mohsen Fakhrizadeh.

=== Kenya ===
In 2015, Kenyan authorities arrested several people accused of working for the IRGC-QD and planning attacks in Kenya. Two Kenyans admitted to assisting the IRGC by recruiting others, spying on targets, and planning attacks on Western and Kenyan interests. They had travelled to Iran for training and received money from Iranian agents. Police reported the group had attempted to recruit children. Earlier in 2012, two Iranians were arrested in Kenya with a large quantity of explosives and were later sentenced to life imprisonment for planning attacks.

=== Morocco ===
In January 2025, Moroccan authorities and counter terrorism police foiled attempted attacks on the Israeli liaison office in Morocco. These attempts were linked to Polisario Front, an Iranian proxy based in West Africa.

=== Nigeria ===
Iran has supported the Islamic Movement in Nigeria (IMN) with money and training, using it as a proxy to increase its influence in West Africa. The group does not recognise the Nigerian government and aims to establish an Islamic state similar to that of Iran. Iran, along with its proxy Hezbollah, has reportedly provided the IMN with ideological and military training in Hezbollah facilities and approximately $120,000 a year.

=== South Africa ===
==== Plot to assassinate US Ambassador to South Africa ====
In 2020, US intelligence revealed that Iran was planning to assassinate US Ambassador to South Africa, Lana Marks. She was targeted due to her close ties to then President Donald Trump, as well as the IRGC's established clandestine network in South Africa. The plot, linked to the Iranian Embassy in Pretoria, was among several options Iran considered to avenge Qassem Soleimani’s death, which had already prompted missile attacks on US bases in Iraq.

== Asia ==
Since the 1979 Islamic Revolution, Iran has conducted numerous clandestine operations throughout Asia. These include espionage, assassination attempts, cyberattacks, terrorism and illicit financial networks. Increasingly, these activities are outsourced to domestic criminal organizations. These operations are led by the IRGC-QF, Ministry of Intelligence and Security (MOIS), and affiliated proxies.

=== Azerbaijan ===
==== 2023-2024 coup and assassination plot ====
The 2023-2024 coup and assassination plot was an Iranian effort to assassinate prominent government figures, in order to destabilise Azerbaijan and promote Iranian interests in the Caucasus region. It was uncovered by Azerbaijani authorities, who arrested Iranian-affiliated agents. These individuals received military training in Iran under the guise of religious education and a list of officials against whom attacks were to be targeted.

==== Assassination attempt on MP Fazil Mustafa ====
MP Fazil Mustafa is a critic of the Iranian regime. On 28 March 2023, a failed assassination attempt was made on his life,reportedly by Iran, which he survived.

==== Assassination plot on Rabbi Sneor Segal ====
Late in 2024 Agil Aslanov, a Georgian drug trafficker was recruited by an officer of the IRGC-QD who offered him $200,000 to assassinate Rabbi Shneor Segal in Baku. After meeting IRGC-QD operatives in Iran, Aslanov returned to Azerbaijan and began surveillance of the rabbi. He then reported this information to Iranian intelligence agencies. In January 2025, Azerbaijani security services intercepted the plot, and arrested the suspects, charging them with conspiracy to commit a terrorist act.

=== Gulf states ===
In 2026, following the 2026 Iran war and mainly in the ceasefire that followed, countries like Kuwait, Bahrain and the UAE have reported the arrest of dozens of IRGC operatives. These arrests were done following claims of espionage, security related activities, attempts of infiltration.

=== Japan ===
==== Assassination of Hitoshi Igarashi ====
Hitoshi Igarashi was a well-known Japanese scholar and translator of Arabic and Persian literature, best known for translating Salman Rushdie’s novel The Satanic Verses into Japanese. In 1989, Iran's Supreme Leader Ayatollah Khomeini issued a religious order, or fatwa, calling for the death of Rushdie and anyone who helped publish the book. Igarashi was assassinated on 11 July 1991, in his office at the University of Tsukuba in Ibaraki, Japan. Sources claim the assassination was performed by the IRGC.

=== India ===
On 13 February 2012, as part of the 2012 attacks on Israeli diplomats, a motorcyclist attached a magnetic "sticky bomb" to the car of Tal Yehoshua Koren, the wife of the Israeli defence attaché in New Delhi. She was wounded alongside her driver and two bystanders.

=== Thailand ===
The 2012 Bangkok bombing is the most notable incident of Iranian operations in Thailand. Iranian operatives accidentally triggered an explosion in a Bangkok residence they rented. The blast caused two of them to flee the site, while the badly injured third operative attempted to escape by taxi. The driver refused to stop, so he threw a bomb at the vehicle, injuring the driver and bystanders. Authorities finally arrested him after another failed bombing attempt, which resulted in the loss of his legs.

== Oceania ==
=== Australia ===
In Australia, Iran's criminal activities include hacking attacks on Australian government and business systems, smuggling methamphetamine through Southeast Asia. It avoids international sanctions through the usage of informal financial systems. Reports suggest that Australian authorities have evidence that Iranian officials were spying on and threatening Iranian dissidents living in Australia. Additionally, Australian intelligence services have uncovered plots to kill or kidnap people. In response, Australia has strengthened its cybersecurity, cracked down on drug operations, and strengthened laws against spying and foreign interference.

On 26 August 2025, it was reported Australia has announced it will expel the Iranian ambassador over two antisemitic attacks organized by the Iranian regime. This is based on The Australian Security Intelligence Organization (ASIO) conclusions finding that the Iranian government was behind the attacks on the Lewis Continental Kitchen, a kosher food company, in Sydney in October 2024 and the attack on the Addas Israel synagogue in Melbourne in December 2024. In addition, Australia has declared the IRGC as a terrorist organization.

in May 2026 it was reported that Iranian linked spy networks were operating in Australia. They were recruiting Australians and others via Telegram to gather information about Israeli and Jewish communities in exchange for cryptocurrency payments. According to the report recruiters screened potential informants online, asking if they have access to government officials, Israeli contacts and willingness to perform intelligence work.

This low cost method of operation, using digital platforms for espionage, was also detected in Britain, where teenagers were offered £500 to film targets. Security experts say this is a way of exploitation of open democratic societies, Iranian diaspora leaders say this is an evolution of Iran’s intimidation methods and influence tactics.

== Online ==
During the 2025–2026 Iranian protests, the Iranian diaspora held solidarity rallies worldwide, with some facing violence and threats during the demonstrations. Deutsche Welle reported that Iranian exiles were being targeted internationally by the Iranian government's secret services. Iranians abroad faced intimidation and threats for their online discourse and opinions. On 24 January, The Telegraph reported that Iranian dissidents in the United Kingdom were receiving death threats via phone calls and messages from Islamic Republic supporters, threatening to kill them in the UK. Iranians abroad were also the targets of online cybersecurity threats and phishing scams at the time of the protests amid the domestic internet blackout. An investigative watchdog stated that pro-government editors were active during the crackdown across Wikipedia and other services in deleting content and sanitizing articles related to the Islamic Republic's human rights record. Likewise, another independent research group stated the Islamic Republic had coordinated a large social media influence operation aimed at shaping global narratives.

== See also ==
- Iran and state-sponsored terrorism
- Islamic Revolutionary Guard Corps – Quds Force
- Ministry of Intelligence (Iran)
- Cyberwarfare by Iran
- Foxtrot (criminal network)
- 2024 Iranian operations inside Australia
- 2026 Iranian diaspora protests
- Political repression in the Islamic Republic of Iran
