= Hojjatie Society =

Conservative Iranian Shia organization

Anjoman-e Hojjatieh, also called The Hojjatie Society (Persian: انجمن خیریه حجتیه مهدویه, romanized: Anjoman-e Kheyriyeh Hojjatiyeh Mahdaviyeh, lit. 'Charity Society of Allah's Proof Over Creation', also spelled hojjatiya), is a traditionalist Iranian Shi'i lay religious organization. It was founded by Mashhad-based cleric Mahmoud Halabi in the 1950s to counter pioneers of the Baha'i Faith, "who claimed that the long-awaited Twelfth Imam of Shi'ite Islam had returned", and that Shia Islam was now superseded by the Baháʼí Faith. Along with training "cadres for the 'scientific defense'" of Shiʿi Islam against the Baháʼí, the group promotes religious orthodoxy through evangelism, works to hasten the return of the Mahdi (the prophesied redeemer/messiah of Islam). Its socio-economic roots are in the bazaar and the traditional middle class of Iran, and has been called "semi-clandestine".

While the Hojjatieh has not been alone among religious Muslims in Iran in strongly opposing the Baháʼí Faith (whose persecution has involved dozens of killings and the destruction and desecration of Baháʼí communal and private property), Mahmud Sadri, a Hojjatieh member, claims that the Society is committed to eliminating the Baháʼí faith non-violently. According to him, its leader Ḥalabi has repeatedly warned his followers against persecution of Baháʼís, saying: "This is not the way, this is not our way". On the other hand, a more accurate depiction of their activities by its members as well as by Baha’is who been physically attacked by the group shows the violent nature of Hojjatieh.

Hojjatieh Society played a significant role in intimidating, and persecuting Baha'is. Having infiltrated the Baha'i community, they played an effective role in the kidnapping, arresting and mass executions of Baha'i leaders, as well as trying to paralyze the daily lives of Baha'is in Iran. After Ruhollah Khomeini threatened the Hojjatieh Society and accused them of treason and reaction, the Society dissolved itself. The voluntary dissolution of Hojjatieh did not reduce its activities and influence in the government institutions of the Islamic Republic, but on the contrary, it expanded its influence in suppressing of the Baha'is of Iran after the Iranian revolution.

Since its dissolution, members of Hojjatieh have since been active in Iran’s judiciary, security system, and in offices responsible for staffing Iran’s governmental institutions. There are several political figures who had a history of membership in the association, or sympathized with its anti-Bahá'íism, and after the 1979 revolution assumed power in the Islamic Republic; Ali Khamenei, Ali Akbar Velayati, Mohammad Ali Rajaei, Kamal Kharazi, Haddad Adel, Ali-Akbar Parvesh, and Javad Zarif are a few examples. Mehdi Abrishamchi was formerly a member of the association before joining MEK.

Despite sharing many of the same conservative religious Shi'i values as the Islamic Republic of Iran and its founder Ayatollah Ruhollah Khomeini, the society has clashed with Khomeini and his supporters over several issues. These include the Hojjatiyeh's opposition to the Khomeini doctrine of Velayat-e faqih, (sometime) populist leftist government policies, and involvement by the religious in politics in general (until the appearance of the Mahdi); and the regime's opposition to the (alleged) secret members of the Hojjatiyeh who have (allegedly) infiltrated the Iranian government. Halabi officially suspended the operation of the society and all its activities in 1983, after what was widely seen as a verbal attack on the society by Khomeini, although some believe Hojjatieh (or at least the "Ḥojjatiya's line") "remains alive" and "began a silent comeback" in the 1990s.

== Name ==
The name of the organization, Hojjatieh, originates from the word Hojjat, often translated in English as "proof". One of the titles of the Mahdi in Shiʿi Islam is Hujjatullah ("Proof of Allah"). An earlier organization, the Anjoman-e Imám-e Zaman (called Anjoman-e Zedd-e Baháʼí privately), was founded by Halabi. After the Iranian Revolution it was renamed Anjoman-e Hojjatieh Mahdavieh (called Hojjatieh for short).

== History ==
The organization was founded in 1953 in Tehran by a member of the Shiʿi clergy, Shaikh Mahmoud Halabi, with permission of Ayatollah Seyyed Hossein Borujerdi. The founding premise of the organization was that the most immediate threat to Islam was the Baháʼí Faith, which they viewed as a heresy whose elimination was imperative. Halabi believed "that whatever had gone wrong politically and in society at large was due to the influence of Baha'i and, therefore, he had to confront it". Halabi and his followers supported Prime Minister Mohammad Mosaddegh, but following the toppling of Mosaddegh by supporters of the Shah (Mohammad Reza Pahlavi), their activities were allowed to continue "in return" for their support of the Shah's rule .

=== During the Shah's reign ===
In March to June 1955, the Ramadan period that year, a widespread systematic program against the Baháʼí was undertaken cooperatively by the government and the clergy. During the period they destroyed the national Baháʼí Center in Tehran, confiscated properties and made it illegal for a time to be Baháʼí (punishable by 2 to 10 year prison term). Founder of SAVAK, Teymur Bakhtiar, took a pick-axe to a Baháʼí building himself at the time.

Halabi is said to have worked with SAVAK security agency under Shah Mohammad Reza Pahlavi, offering his full cooperation in fighting "other heathen forces, including the Communists." By doing so he was given freedom to recruit members and raise funds. By the early, 1970s Hojjatiyeh was active not only all over Iran but also in neighboring countries; and by 1977 the society was said to have had 12,000 members.

=== During the Islamic Republic ===
According to Taheri, in Halabi's view the Shah's regime allowed the Baháʼís too much freedom, and as Khomeini's movement to overthrow the Shah gained momentum, he gave his support to them. However, Encyclopædia Iranica states the Islamic revolution "caught Ḥojjatiya by surprise", and the "initial reaction of the leadership" toward the revolution was "one of skepticism and suspicion". According to Muhammad Sahimi writing for the American PBS, after the fall of the Pahlavi Shah to Khomeini's supporters in February 1979, Halabi attempted to "maneuver his association into prominence, counting on its religious credentials". This was despite his doctrinal differences with Khomeini about Shia involvement in politics and the need to hasten the Mahdi, Halabi's cooperation with the old regime which Khomeini's supporters loathed passionately, and the group's fierce opposition to "leftists and communists", who had played a part in the Shah's overthrow. Nonetheless, many Hojjatiyeh members were appointed to administrative positions because of their "impeccable" religious credentials. Khomeini's supporters began openly criticizing the association for its apolitical nature and its “conservative bias” in interpreting Islam. Khomeini allowed this criticism, and on 12 July 1983 he went further, declaring,

Those who believe that we should allow sins to increase until the 12th Imam reappears should modify and reconsider their position.... The Imam will return to eliminate sin, but we should sin so that he will return? Set aside such wrong thinking. If you are Muslim and if you believe in your country, get rid of this factionalism and join the wave that is carrying the nation forward; otherwise, it will break you.

This was widely seen as a "thinly veiled" attack on the Hojjatieh's approach to hastening the Mahdi (see "Doctrine" below). Khomeini also made what was seen by many as an accusation of opportunism against the Hojjatiyeh:

Those who had declared the struggle [against the Shah] as haraam [sinful], and had tried to break the call against the Shah for not celebrating 15 Sha'baan [anniversary of the birth of Imam Mahdi] have become more revolutionary than the revolutionaries.

Halabi responded by announcing the suspension (but not the dissolution) of Hojjatiyeh the same day, but did not admit that "the group was the target of the ayatollah's wrath". The announcement was "followed by a widespread campaign to purge Ḥojjatiya affiliates from decision-making, academic, and educational bodies throughout Iran." Since then both Iranian conservatives and reformists have "accused their rivals of Hojjatie tendencies". However, after the death of Khomeini, the group was reportedly able to "engineer a return to favor" with the help of Ayatollah Mohammad-Taqi Mesbah-Yazdi. In addition, because of the ambiguity of Khomeini's attack, at least as of 2010, "it is still a matter of debate whether Khomeini truly ordered Hojjatiyeh to stop its activities," with one Hojjatiyeh adherent stating, "there is no document indicating a confrontation between Ayatollah Khomeini" and Hojjatiyeh.

In July 2006, the Tehran newspaper "Kayhan" reported that several Hojjatieh Society members had been arrested, while a number of reformist sources warned of a Hojjatieh revival under the administration of Mahmoud Ahmadinejad from 2005–2013.

According to Ronen A. Cohen, a split within the Hojjatiyeh "led to the creation of the "Mahdiviyat movement" that was "terminated by the Iranian regime" and blamed for unsuccessful planned assassinations of Ali Razini, President Akbar Hashemi Rafsanjani and Mohammad Khatami and Ayatollah Yazdi.

== Doctrine ==
As a traditionalist Shia organization, Hojjatieh opposes not only the Baha'i, but also Sunniism and Ruhollah Khomeini's heterodox concept of Velayat-e Faqih, which many Shi'a clergy viewed as heretical. The organization has also been called "semi-clandestine".

The slogan of the Hujjatiyeh was "any flag raised before the coming of the Mahdi, its carrier is taghut [an idolator] and worships something other than God [i.e. is a heretic]." According to Michael M. J. Fischer, the name Hujjatiyeh had "a dual function". Just as Halabi (and Hujjatiyeh) denied the claim of the Baháʼí that al-Báb (the forerunner of the Baháʼí faith) was the Imam-e Zaman/Mahdi, so Halabi also denied Khomeini the title of Nayeb-e-Imam (aide to the Imam). Halabi himself (according to Fischer), "hinted that he was in daily contact" with the Imam-e-Zaman".

=== Nonviolent stance ===
Whether Hojjatieh is nonviolent, or nonviolent but still dangerous is disputed.

According to legal scholar Noah Feldman, the idea that supporters "want to bring back the imam by violence, rather than ... wait piously and prepare for the imam's eventual return on his own schedule," is a common misinterpretation of the society's position by those "outside Iran". In fact, the unfavorable treatment of Hojjatiya Society by Khomeini's government and supporters was in part because of the group's "quiescent view that the mahdi's arrival could not be hastened." Ronen A. Cohen writes that violent activities against the Baháʼí by some members of the organization were in violation of the society's doctrine. According to an interview with a Hojjatie leader in the Encyclopædia Iranica, the organization does not follow the state sanctioned persecution of Iran's Baháʼís, and remains strictly pacifist and totally opposed to violence and persecution:

As the leaders of Ḥojjatiya were committed to a non-violent, persuasive strategy in dealing with Bahais [sic], the Association did not take part in persecution of Bahais in post-revolutionary Iran. For all Ḥalabi's animus against Bahais, he was a disciplined pacifist. He was distraught by violence and repeatedly warned his followers: "This is not the way, this is not our way"

On the other hand according to Yazdani, some sympathetic scholars and former members such as Sadri have tried to depict the Hojjatieh as a largely non-violent association. A more accurate depiction of its activities and their at times violent nature has been recorded by others among its members as well as by Baha’is who been physically attacked by the group. The statement made by the reformist Muslim ‘Abd al-Karim Soroush as to why he left the association as a young man testifies to the fact that its activities included some physical violence which led the young Soroush to dissociate himself from it.

Hojjatieh Society played a significant role in intimidation, and persecuting Baha'is. Having infiltrated the Baha'i community, they played an effective role in the kidnapping, arresting and mass executions of Baha'i leaders, as well as trying to paralyze the daily life of Baha'is in Iran.

=== Khomeini as "Imam" ===
According to scholar Vali Nasr, Hojjatieh were "uncomfortable with Khomeini's insinuation that he was or represented the Twelfth Imam," and this may have led to their disbanding.

=== Encouraging the appearance of the Mahdi ===
However according to other sources, while the organization may oppose violence and political activity by its own members, it believes disorder and suffering (and sin and violence) are necessary to hasten the appearance of the Mahdi. This concept was the basis of Khomeini's statement that "those who believe that we should allow sins to increase until the 12th Imam reappears should modify and reconsider their position". In an article in Foreign Affairs, Jerry Guo claimed that the Hojjatieh society is "an underground messianic sect ... which hopes to quicken the coming of the apocalypse" in order to hasten the return of the Mahdi, the prophesied future redeemer of Islam.

Another (hostile Israeli) source (Herzliya), also talks of the group's belief that "true Islamic government must await the return of the Hidden Imam" aka Mahdi, which it desires to "hasten". Although the group is "quietist" in that "the essence" of its doctrine is that Muslims should avoid political activity (including Khomeini's "Islamic government") until the appearance of the Hidden Imam", Shia doctrine holds that because the Imam is full of compassion for Islamic believers and because his appearance will lead to the establishment of perfect order and justice on earth, he is less likely to appear when earthly conditions are good and more likely when conditions are chaotic and intolerable and he "will feel obliged to" step in and "save the believers". According to Muhammad Sahimi, writing for PBS, "association members believe that the return will happen only when the Islamic world is in chaos and sin prevails." It is this "element of the Hojatiyeh doctrine", according to Shmuel Bar, "which implies willingness to incur risks that otherwise would be unreasonable" if they were not trying to encourage the Mahdi to reappear; (In contrast, Khomeini and his supporters maintain that they have created a just Islamic society, and this, not injustice, will encourage the Mahdi to come.)

== Accusations ==
=== Harassment ===
According to Michael M. J. Fischer, a local leader of Halabi's group in Yazd—Sayyid Reza Paknejad—boasted that "he had some 50 double agents who had infiltrated the Baha'is, kept tabs on them and harassed them when feasible."

=== Rumored secret members and sympathizers ===
Since the 1980s, the accusation has frequently been made that the real power in the Islamic Republic lies in hands of people who are secretly affiliated with Hojjatieh. According to Muhammad Sahimi some high-ranking officials within the government or networks of the Islamic Republic who have been alleged to be secretly members of the Hojjatieh are:

- Ali-Akbar Parvaresh, a former minister of education, deputy Majles speaker, and member of the right-wing Islamic Coalition Party, who has been implicated in the explosion of the Jewish center in Argentina in 1994;
- Ayatollah Abolqasem Khazali, a reactionary former member of the Guardian Council;
- Ayatollah Ahmad Azari Qomi (1925-1999), the country's prosecutor general in the 1980s. He is known to have questioned the system of Velayat-e Faqih.

Iranian sources report Ayatollah Mesbah Yazdi is the highest-ranking member of the Hojjatieh. He denies this and has declared that if anyone finds a connection between him and Hojjatieh, he will denounce everything he stands for. In defense of his denial, it has been argued that Yazdi's involvement with the government of the Islamic Republic is in violation of Hojjatieh doctrine that political involvement must wait for the arrival of the twelfth Imam.

The president of Iran Mahmoud Ahmadinejad from 2005–2013 is also rumored to be an advocate of Hojjatieh through the influence of Ayatollah Yazdi, who was his mentor. Asia Times reports that Ahmad Tavassoli, a former chief of staff of Khomeini, claimed in 2005 that "the executive branch of the Iranian government as well as the crack troops of the Revolutionary Guards have been hijacked by the Hojjatieh, which, he implied, now also controls Ahmadinejad." According to the report, Hojjatieh were endangering Iran by working for Shia supremacy. Feldman writing in 2006 in the New York Times suggests this rumor was spread by Ahmadinejad's enemies. It is also reported that Esfandiar Rahim Mashaei, who was to have been Ahmedinejad's First Vice President, may be a Hojjatieh member, but the source of this information is unclear.

Leading clerics who supported the revolution were sympathizers of the organization, including Ali Akbar Parvaresh, Mohammad Reza Mahdavi Kani, and Ali Akbar Nateq Nouri.

According to an article published by Ali Alfoneh and Reuel Marc Gerecht, the memoirs of Iranian foreign minister Mohammad-Javad Zarif strongly suggest a family upbringing with the Hojjatieh.

== Structure and characteristics ==
=== Instruction ===
According to information compiled from interviews made after the suspension of the association, beginning in the early 1970s the group organized itself to reflect "increasing complexity and division of labor". Training in the group involved basic instruction (pāya), intermediary training (viža), and graduate training (naqd-e Iqān). Training classes met weekly in private homes across Iran. Instructional material was distributed in typed and copied form. These materials "were retrieved within a week so that no copies would leave the provenance of the association", and "students were instructed not to share or discuss the material with outsiders."

Finance

Money needed for "logistical purposes" came from religious tithes (sahm-e emām)" for which the society obtained "religious dispensations from Shiʿite grand Ayatollahs. Otherwise the society received no outside funding and all its members were volunteers.

=== Teams of operations ===
The official goal of Hojjatiyeh was "to train cadres for the 'scientific defense'" of Shiʿi Islam in the face of the Bahai theological challenge. Members received "basic instruction" on Shiʿite and Bahai history and theology, after which they might be recruited into "specialist teams of operations". These included:

- The Guidance Team (Goruh-e eršād), which was in charge of "debating Bahai missionaries, persuading Bahais to return to Islam, and neutralizing the effects of Bahai missionary activity on those exposed to it".
- The Instruction Team (Goruh-e tadris) along with the
- Authorship Team (Goruh-e negā-reš)

They worked jointly to standardize instructional material and levels.

- The public speaking team (Goruh-e soḵanrāni) organized weekly public gatherings in various venues that featured trained Ḥojjatiya speakers discussing Shiʿite theology, critiquing Bahai positions, and fielding questions.
- The intelligence or "Investigation Team" (Goruh-e taḥqiq) "operated in three distinct regiments, as a 'fifth column' within the Bahai ranks". It allegedly "thoroughly" penetrated "the Bahai hierarchy", including the ranks of "prominent Bahai missionaries".

The "most salient specialists" in Hojjatieh were known as "polemical activists (mobārez), public speakers (soḵanrān), instructors (modarres), and intelligence operatives (mo-ḥaqqeq)". Most full-fledged Ḥojjatiya members "carried out at least two of the above duties in the course of weekly meetings".

=== Culture ===
Unlike more traditional conservatives, Hojjatiyeh worked to present a "modern image". Hojjatieh used lecterns, tables and chairs, instead of sitting on carpets. Members are clean shaven and wore "sharp-looking suits", with Halabi being the only one who wore a turban. According to Michael Fischer, the suits were worn to avoid giving Bahai forewarning they were dealing with traditionalists.

According to Hojjatieh, its campaign was so effective that Bahais adopted "a more defensive and reserved posture ... avoiding open debates and confrontations".

== See also ==
- Political objections to the Baháʼí Faith
- Haghani Circle

== Bibliography ==
- Mahmoud Sadri. "Hojjatiya". Encyclopedia Iranica.
- Ronen A. Cohen (13 February 2013). The Hojjatiyeh Society in Iran: Ideology and Practice from the 1950s to the Present. Palgrave Macmillan. ISBN 978-1-137-30478-0.
- Filiu, Jean-Pierre (2011). Apocalypse in Islam. Translated by DeBevoise, M. B. Berkely: University of California Press. ISBN 978-0-520-26431-1. JPFAiI2011.
- Sahimi, Mohammad (29 September 2010). "Hojjatiyeh, Mesbahiyeh, and Ahmadinejad". PBS.
