= Kazem Rajavi =

Iranian politician (1934–1990)

Kazem Radjavi
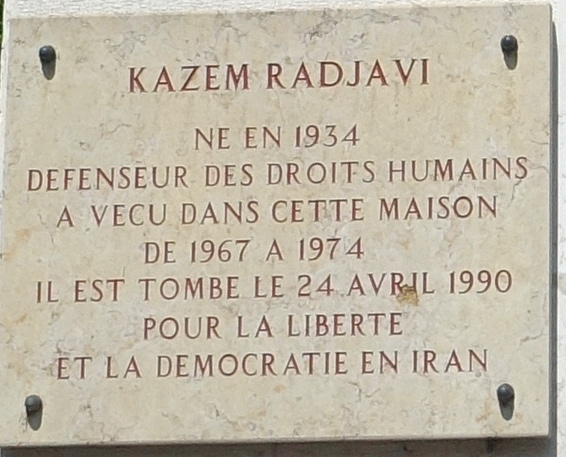
- Plaque in memory of Kazem Radjavi, in Geneva (Note: Born in 1934 Human Rights Defender Lived in this house from 1967 to 1974 He was felled on April 24, 1990 for freedom and democracy in Iran)

Ambassador of Islamic Republic of Iran to the United Nations Office at Geneva
- In office 1979–1980
- President: Abulhassan Banisadr
- Prime Minister: Mehdi Bazargan; Mohammad-Ali Rajai
- Preceded by: Jafar Nadim (Shah era)
- Succeeded by: Mostafa Dabiri

Personal details
- Born: 8 February 1934 Tabas, Iran
- Died: 24 April 1990 (aged 56) Coppet, Switzerland
- Cause of death: Assassination by gunshot
- Party: National Council of Resistance of Iran

Kazem Radjavi (Persian: کاظم رجوی) (8 February 1934 – 24 April 1990) was an Iranian university professor known for his work as a human rights advocate. He was also the elder brother of Iranian Mujahedin-e Khalq (MEK) leader Massoud Rajavi. When, in 1971, Massoud Rajavi was arrested and sentenced to death, Kazem Rajavi managed to prevent the execution by forming an international campaign and changing the verdict to life imprisonment.

He engaged in international endeavors to defend human rights in Iran, was a "major opposition voice to the fundamentalist government of Iranian". He held a PhD from the Graduate Institute of International Studies in Geneva and was a political science professor at Geneva University. He is believed to have been assassinated by Islamic Republic of Iran agents.

Iranian official Ali Fallahian is charged by a Swiss court with masterminding the assassination of Kazem Rajavi, near Geneva in broad daylight by several agents on 24 April 1990. An international arrest warrant has been issued against Fallahian, and as a result he is unable to leave Iran.

== Career ==
Kazem Rajavi was Iran's first Ambassador to the United Nations headquarters in Geneva following the 1979 Iranian Revolution. However, he left the post just after one year.

Rajavi was also an orator and well-known human rights activist. He became the representative of the National Council of Resistance of Iran (NCRI) in Switzerland where each year he headed the People's Mujahedin of Iran delegation to the United Nations Human Rights Commission, and was "vocal in the campaign against repression in Iran". Rajavi also held a professorship and taught at the School of Law at Geneva University for nearly 10 years.

Rajavi had received several threats from agents of the Islamic Republic of Iran, but continued his work as a dissident and human rights activist.

== Death ==
Although Dr Rajavi had been threatened more than once by Islamic Republic agents, he had continued his work that led to the UN General Assembly and Human Rights Committee to condemn Iran for making violations. On 24 April 1990, Kazem Rajavi was killed in Geneva. He was shot in the head at close range, with the assassins escaping the scene. After Dr Rajavi's assassination, 162 American Congress members condemned the murder while praising Rajavi for "his devotion to human rights and the cause of democracy in Iran - for which he had sacrificed his life". The congressmen's letter also said that the Iranian government was responsible for the murder, also pointing out that Iranian government press had warned governments in the west to "prohibit Mojahedin activities in their territories". Also the European Parliament issued a statement condemning the Islamic Republic "both for the assassination and the continuous violations of human rights inside and outside the country". Two months after the assassination, Swiss security agencies made the assumption that Iranian officials holding "service passports" were responsible for the murder.

Swiss authorities and the U.S State Department held the Iran regime responsible for Kazem Rajavi's assassination. According to a Washington Post report in 1993, Kazem Rajavi's assassination, presumably provides the clearest example of Tehran connection.

== Pursuit of perpetrators ==
The U.S. government imposed visa restrictions on 13 Iranian officials whom they accused of involvement in Rajavi's killing. According to Mike Pompeo, the Iranian officials acted "under the highest orders of their government to silence opposition and show that no one is safe from the Iranian regime". According to the State Department "These 13 individuals, who posed as Iranian diplomats, were acting under the highest orders of their government to silence opposition and show that no one is safe from the Iranian regime, no matter where they live". The suspects included Sadegh Baba'i.e., Ali Reza Hamadani, Said Danesh, Ali Hadavi, Saeed Hemati, Mohammad Reza Jazayeri, Moshen Esfahani, Ali Moslehiaraghi, Naser Pourmirzai, Mohsen Pourshafiee, Mohammad Rezvani, Mahmoud Sajadian and Yadollah Samadi. Also implicated in the assassination were Mohammad Hossein Malaek (Iranian ambassador to Switzerland) and Karim-Abadi (Iran's consul-general in Geneva).

In November 1992, two of the suspects, Mohsen Sharif Esfahani and Ahmad Taheri, were arrested in France, and in February, the high court in Paris ruled that the two men should be extradited to Switzerland. The government in France, however, secretly deported the two suspects back to Iran.

Christian Dunant (Swiss Chargé d'Affaires) made a formal protest to the French Foreign Ministry saying "the French action violated European extradition treaties and a European accord against terrorism." The decision to repatriate the suspects caused protests throughout France and was condemned by the U.S. The European Parliament "condemned the Islamic Republic both for the assassination and for the continuous violation of human rights inside and outside the country."

Informed sources said that Paris had taken seriously "Iranian threats of launching a new wave of terrorist operations in France but also against French interests and citizens in both Iran and Lebanon if Paris decided to extradite the two to Switzerland."

The culprits of Kazem Rajavi's killing have gone unpunished to date. On 29 May 2020 Swiss justice system sent a letter to Rajavi's family saying that it would drop the investigation relating to Rajavi's assassination, with the letter saying that "the criminal investigation must be closed because the statute of limitations has been reached".

The decision of the Swiss prosecutor's office was strongly protested by the National Council of Resistance of Iran which issued a statement condemning it, and demanded that the case be kept open. NCRI also called for Issuance of international arrest warrants for Seyyed Ali Khamenei, Hassan Rouhani, then secretary of Iran's Supreme Security Council, and Ali Akbar Velayati, the then foreign minister.

=== Letter to the Deputy Attorney General of the Swiss Confederation ===
In a letter to the Deputy Attorney General of the Swiss Confederation, Vaud Canton's Prosecutor suggested that the assassination of Prof. Kazem Rajavi should be investigated as a case of crime against humanity and not just as a typical homicide. He therefore suggested the case to be transferred to the Attorney General, since genocide and crimes against humanity fall exclusively within the jurisdiction of the Swiss Confederation. In April, ten politicians and personalities in Geneva signed an article in the Tribune de Genève criticizing impunity in Rajavi's case, with Jean Ziegler saying that closing this case would constitute "'impunity for assassins' on Swiss soil."

== See also ==
- Iranian diplomat terror plot trial
- Iran and state-sponsored terrorism
