= Asadollah Asadi =

Iranian diplomat

Asadollah Asadi (Persian: اسدالله اسدی, born 1972) is a former diplomat of the Iranian embassy in Austria. He was found guilty in the Iranian diplomat terror plot trial.

== Arrest and trial ==
Asadi was arrested while returning to his residence in Austria on a highway in the German state of Bavaria on June 10, 2018, accused of being involved in an attempted bombing at a gathering of the National Council of Resistance of Iran (a coalition of opposition groups led by the People's Mojahedin Organization of Iran) in Villepinte, north of Paris. While Asadi was entitled to diplomatic immunity in the country of his posting, Austria, he did not have political immunity on German soil, although Iran objected, saying that it regarded the detention of Assadollah Assadi as unlawful and a violation of international law and the provisions of the 1961 Vienna Convention which only covers diplomats from any arrest in their host country.

Belgian judicial authorities said that Asadi, along with two others, Nasim Naami (33 نسیم نعامی) and Amir Saadoni (امیر سعدونی 38), were suspects.

Iranian Minister of Foreign Affairs Javad Zarif tweeted:

How surprising it is that at the same time as our (Iranian delegation) traveled to Europe with the President of Iran, Iran's alleged operation was launched and one person was arrested. Iran explicitly condemns violence and terrorism everywhere and is ready to address any concerns in this regard.

== Detention in Belgium ==
Asadi, Naami, Saadoni, and Mehrdad Arefani were put on trial by a Belgian court. On 4 February 2021, Asadi was sentenced to 20 years for “attempted murder and involvement in terrorism.” During the trial, it emerged that the high-potential bomb used for the attack was transported inside a diplomatic suitcase and that the official, based in Vienna, left the diplomatic headquarters 289 times to travel around Europe.

A lawyer for the prosecution commented after the trial, "The ruling shows two things: a diplomat doesn't have immunity for criminal acts ... and the responsibility of the Iranian state in what could have been carnage."

== Release ==
On May 26, 2023 it was announced that Asadollah Asadi had been freed following a prisoner swap for Olivier Vandecasteele, a Belgian humanitarian worker who was arrested in Iran in 2022, charged with spying, money laundering and currency smuggling and sentenced to 40 years of prison in 2023 following a sham trial.

== See also ==
- Ahmad Reza Djalali
- Iran and state-sponsored terrorism
- Iranian diplomat terror plot trial
- Trial of Hamid Nouri
- Iranian external operations
