= Naji Sharifi-Zindashti =

Iranian narcotics trafficker accused of international contract killings

Naji Sharifi-Zindashti is an Iranian resident accused of being a narcotics trafficker and engaging in "numerous acts of repression, including assassinations and kidnappings across multiple jurisdictions, to silence critics of the Iranian regime."

Prosecutors assert that Naji Sharifi Zindashti manages a criminal network focused on targeting dissidents and activists outside of Iran. In January 2024, Zindashti was charged with recruiting Canadian Damion Ryan's assistance in carrying out an assassination. Information acquired by Iran International alleges that Naji Sharifi-Zindashti and his cartel also "dominate the narcotics trade thanks to the support of the government militia."

== Biography ==
Zindashti came from a respected family within the Kurdish community of Urmia. His grandfather, Omar Khan Sharifi Zindashti, was a prominent leader during the Kurdistan Republic in Mahabad. Zindashti's father was a commander leading over 60 peshmerga fighters for the Kurdistan Democratic Party of Iran (KDPI). Zindashti's brother, Farhang, perished in combat alongside his father, fighting the IRGC and Iranian security forces. His daughter, Arzu Sherifi Zindashti, was shot and killed in September 2014 along with her driver in Istanbul. Zindashti currently resides in Iran.

== Arrest for contract killing ==
In January 2024, Zindashti was charged with recruiting Canadian Damion Ryan's assistance in carrying out an assassination. Ryan, a member of the Hells Angels, subsequently recruited his associate Adam Pearson, who is currently incarcerated.

According to the indictment, Zindashti contacted Ryan in early 2021 for an update on the alleged murder-for-hire. Ryan reportedly replied that he was organizing things and needed money. A few days later, Zindashti informed Ryan that his organization was ready to proceed, agreeing on a $350,000 payment for the "job," plus an additional $20,000 for expenses. U.S. officials claim that at this point, Zindashti introduced Ryan to Co-Conspirator 1, identified only as "a resident of Iran."

According to the U.S. Treasury Department, Zindashti is a narcotics trafficker linked to a Tehran-based criminal network targeting Iranian dissidents.

=== OFAC and UK investigation ===
The OFAC and the United Kingdom have jointly targeted a network of individuals involved in plotting the assassination of Iranian dissidents and opposition activists under the direction of the Iranian government. According to the U.S. Treasury Department, the network (led by Sharifi-Zindashti) operates at the behest of Iran's Ministry of Intelligence and Security (MOIS) and has engaged in numerous acts of transnational repression, including assassinations and kidnappings across multiple jurisdictions with the aim of silencing perceived critics of the Iranian regime.

== Ali Shamkhani ==
In June 2023, a report by Iran International alleged that Iranian government official Ali Shamkhani was forced to resign after his involvement as a key member of the government circle linked to Naji Sharifi Zindashti was made public.

== See also ==
- Iran and state-sponsored terrorism
