= Massoud Rajavi =

Iranian political activist (born 1948)

- مسعود رجوی
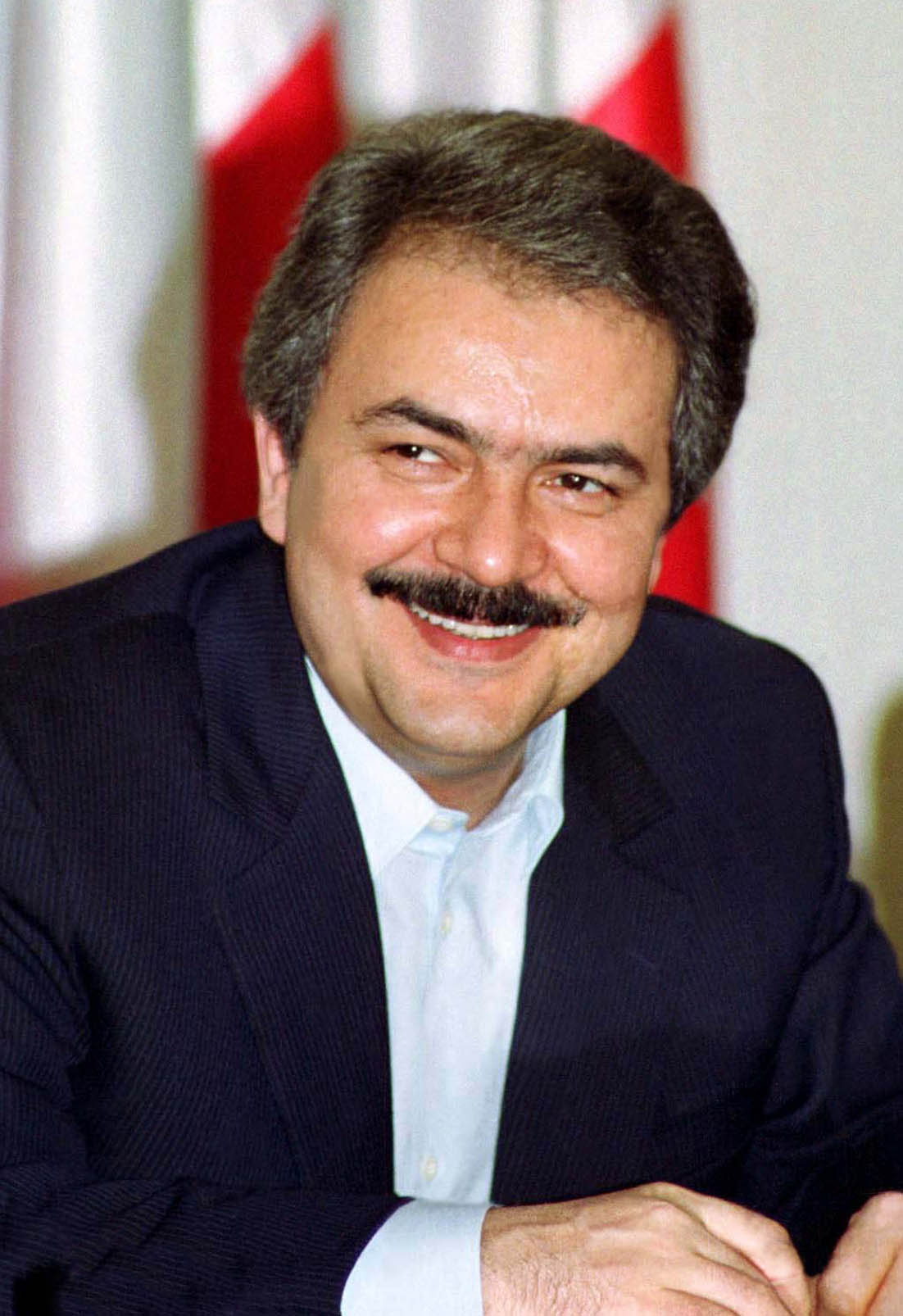
- Rajavi in 1997

Leader of People's Mujahedin of Iran
- Incumbent
- Assumed office 20 January 1979 Co-leader with Maryam Rajavi (from 1985)

Head of the National Council of Resistance of Iran
- Incumbent
- Assumed office 20 July 1981
- President: Abolhassan Banisadr (Note: Banisadr who was affiliated with the National Council of Resistance of Iran from 1981 to 1984, was considered as the "President of Iran" in the claimed government by the council. The office was vacant after Banisadr.); Maryam Rajavi
- Preceded by: Organization established

Personal details
- Born: 18 August 1948 Tabas, Iran
- Party: People's Mujahedin of Iran; NCRI (from 1981)
- Spouses: Ashraf Rabiei (m. 1980; died 1982) Firouzeh Banisadr (m. 1982; div. 1984) Maryam Rajavi (m. 1985)
- Children: 1
- Education: University of Tehran
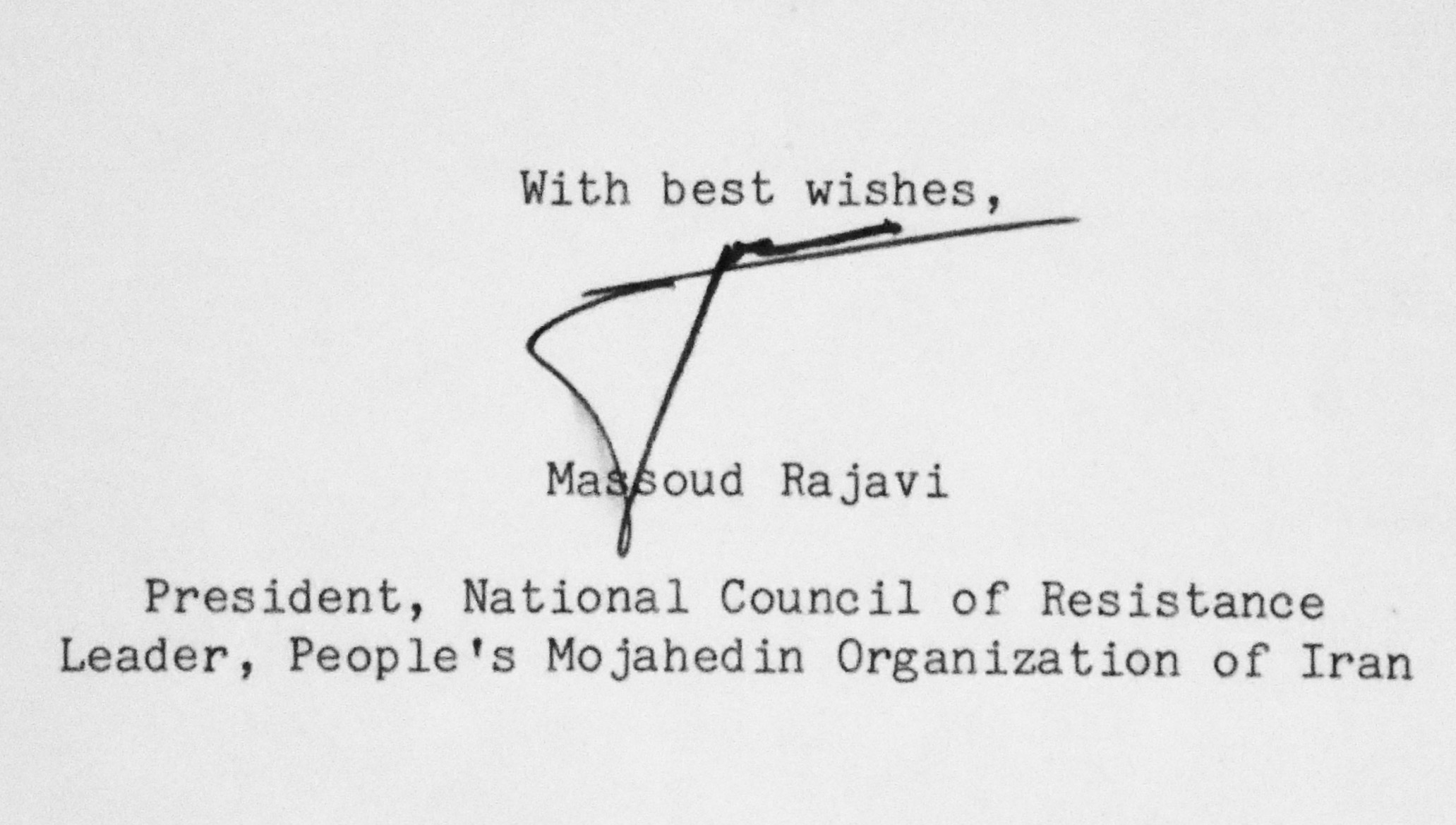
- Signature
- Disappeared: c. 13 March 2003 (aged 54); Camp Ashraf, Ba'athist Iraq

Massoud Rajavi (Note: Persian: مسعود رجوی) (born 18 August 1948 – disappeared c. 13 March 2003) is an Iranian politician and revolutionary who became the leader of the People's Mojahedin Organization of Iran (MEK) in 1979 and the head of the National Council of Resistance of Iran (NCRI) in 1981. He disappeared shortly before the 2003 invasion of Iraq, leaving his wife and co-leader Maryam Rajavi as the public face of the MEK.

== Early life and education ==
Rajavi joined the MEK when he was 20 and a law student at the University of Tehran. He graduated with a degree in political law. Rajavi and the MEK actively opposed the Shah of Iran and participated in the 1979 Iranian Revolution.

== Early political career (1970–1979) ==
During the Pahlavi era, Rajavi was arrested by SAVAK and sentenced to death. Due to efforts by his brother, Kazem Rajavi, and various Swiss lawyers and professors, his sentence was reduced to life imprisonment. He was released from prison during the Iranian Revolution in 1979. After the revolution, Rajavi assumed leadership of the People's Mujahedin of Iran.

== Leader of the MEK (1979–present) ==
When Iran's first presidential election took place in 1980, Rajavi was endorsed by the People's Fedai, the National Democratic Front, the Democratic Party of Kurdistan, Komala and the League of Iranian Socialists. As the MEK had become the main secular opposition to the Islamic Republic, Ayatollah Khomeini barred Rajavi from the elections declaring that "those who did not endorse the Constitution of the Islamic Republic of Iran could not be trusted to abide by that constitution". The MEK had boycotted the constitution by arguing it lacked proper councils, equal rights, nationalized assets, and a classless society.

In 1981, when Ayatollah Khomeini dismissed President Abolhassan Banisadr and a new wave of arrests and executions started in the country, Rajavi and Banisadr fled to Paris from Tehran's airbase. Massoud Rajavi and Banisadr formed the National Council of Resistance of Iran (NCRI) "with the intent to replace the Khomeini regime with the 'Democratic Islamic Republic.'" As a form of agreement with the Islamic republic, in 1986 France's Prime Minister Jacques Chirac evicted the MEK out of France. Rajavi and approximately five to ten thousand MEK members were received by the Iraqi government. After moving to Iraq, Rajavi set up a base on the Iranian border known as Camp Ashraf.

=== Disappearance and legal issues ===
Shortly before the Iraq War, Massoud Rajavi disappeared. His whereabouts remain unknown. In his absence, Maryam Rajavi has assumed his responsibilities as leader of the MEK. According to members of the NCRI, Massoud Rajavi is still alive and in hiding due to being a "prime target" of the Islamic Republic of Iran, while other sources have said that he is presumed dead.

==== Iraq ====
In July 2010, the Iraqi High Tribunal issued an arrest warrant for 39 MEK members, including Rajavi, "due to evidence that confirms they committed crimes against humanity" by "involvement with the former Iraqi security forces in suppressing the 1991 uprising against the former Iraqi regime and the killing of Iraqi citizens". The MEK has denied the charges, saying that they constitute a "politically motivated decision and it's the last gift presented from the government of Nuri al-Maliki to the Iranian government". Back in 2005, a Patriotic Union of Kurdistan official asked for arrest and trial of Rajavi based on his organization's documentary evidence of the involvement.

==== Iran ====
In July 2023, the judiciary of Iran announced a mass trial of 104 MEK members in absentia, including both Maryam and Massoud Rajavi.

== Electoral history ==
Year	Election	Votes	%	Rank	Notes
1979	Tehran elections for the Assembly of Experts (10 seats)	297,707	11.78	12th	Lost
1980	President	–			Barred
1980	Tehran elections for the Parliament	531,943	24.9	38th	Run-off
1980	Parliament run-off	▼375,762	▼23	21st	Lost

== Personal life ==
Rajavi came from a prominent family. He received a degree in political law from Tehran University. His brother Kazem Rajavi was Iran's ambassador to the United Nations in Geneva who held doctoral degrees from universities in Paris and Geneva. They had three other brothers, Saleh (a cardiologist in France), Ahmad (a British-educated surgeon), and Hooshang (an engineer in Belgium).

Rajavi married fellow MEK member Ashraf Rabiei in summer 1980. Rabiei was regarded as "the symbol of revolutionary womanhood". She was surrounded and killed by the Islamic Revolutionary Guard Corps (IRGC) in 1982. Rajavi has a son from his first wife, named Mostafa. His second wife was Abolhassan Banisadr's daughter, Firouzeh. Their marriage took place in October 1982 and the couple divorced in 1984, after Banisadr left the NCRI. Rajavi married Maryam Qajar Azodanlu (later known as Maryam Rajavi) in 1985.

== Notes ==
Party political offices
Vacant Title last held by Central Cadre	Leader of People's Mujahedin of Iran; January 1979 — present (?); Served alongside: Maryam Rajavi (since 1985)	Incumbent
