= Iran and state-sponsored terrorism =

Iran-related controversy

Since the Iranian Revolution in 1979, the government of the Islamic Republic of Iran has been accused by several countries of training, financing, and providing weapons and safe havens for non-state militant actors, such as Hezbollah in Lebanon, Houthis in Yemen, Hamas in Gaza, and other Palestinian groups such as the Islamic Jihad (IJ) and the Popular Front for the Liberation of Palestine (PFLP). These groups are designated terrorist groups by a number of countries and international bodies such as the EU and NATO, but Iran considers such groups to be "national liberation movements" with a right to self-defense against Israeli military occupation. Iran's critics say that it uses these groups as political proxies across the Middle East and Europe to foment instability, expand the scope of the Islamic Revolution, and carry out attacks against Western targets in the regions. Its special operations unit, the Quds Force, is known to provide arms, training, and financial support to "militias and political movements" across the Middle East, including Bahrain, Iraq, Lebanon, Palestine, Syria, and Yemen.

A number of countries (Argentina, Albania, Australia, Bulgaria, Denmark, France, India, Kenya, Sweden, Thailand, and the United States) have accused Iran's government and the Islamic Revolutionary Guards Corps of plotting assassinations or bombings in their countries and others against perceived enemies of Iran. In response, economic sanctions against the Iranian regime have been imposed by many countries and the United Nations. The first sanctions were imposed by the United States in November 1979, after a group of radical students seized the U.S. embassy in Tehran and took hostages. The sanctions were expanded in 1995 to include business dealings with the Iranian government.

== Islamic Revolutionary Guard Corps (IRGC) ==
After the fall of the Shah in 1979, the Islamic Republic of Iran established the Islamic Revolutionary Guard Corps (IRGC) to domestically promote the government's social policy. IRGC is accused of spreading its ideology in neighboring regions by training and funding terrorist organizations. By 1986, IRGC had 350,000 members and had a small naval and air force. By 1996, its ground forces numbered 100,000 and the naval forces numbered 20,000. They are believed to use the Quds Force to train Islamist militants.

In 1995, the Iranian Revolutionary Guard held a conference in Beirut with organizations accused of engaging in terrorism including the Iraqi Da'wah Party, the Islamic Front for the Liberation of Bahrain and Hezbollah for the sole purpose of providing training and weapons to these organizations, to aid in the destabilization of Gulf states, and give assistance to militants in these countries to replace the existing governments with Iran-aligned regimes.

The United States State Department has stated that IRGC provides support for Hamas, Hezbollah and Palestinian Islamic Jihad to fight against Israel, while aiding the Iraqi insurgency in southern Iraq.

=== Terrorist designation ===
Currently, the IRGC is designated as a terrorist organization by Australia, Bahrain, Canada, European Union, Paraguay, Saudi Arabia, Sweden, Ukraine and the United States. The Quds Force branch of the IRGC is designated as a terrorist organization by most of the aforementioned countries, in addition to Israel.

In 2025, the Australian government accused the IRGC of conducting arson attacks inside Australia in 2024, which prompted the government to expel the Iranian ambassador to Australia Ahmad Sadeghi.

== Alleged activities in other countries ==
=== Albania ===
On 19 December 2018 Albania expelled Iran's ambassador to the country, Gholamhossein Mohammadnia, and another Iranian diplomat for "involvement in activities that harm the country's security", for "violating their diplomatic status and supporting terrorism." The expelled Iranians were alleged to have plotted terrorist attacks in the country, including targeting MEK\PMOI event to silence dissidents.

In July 2022, Iranian state cyber actors—who identified themselves as "HomeLand Justice"—launched a destructive cyber attack against the Albanian government, rendering websites and services unavailable. An FBI investigation indicates Iranian state cyber actors acquired initial access to the Albanian network approximately 14 months before launching the attack. On July 18, HomeLand Justice claimed credit. In September 2022, the same actors launched another wave of Cyberattack against the Albanian infrastructure, using similar malware as the Cyberattack in July. As a result, Albania officially severed diplomatic ties with Iran and ordered Iranian embassy staff to leave the country, citing the cyberattacks.

=== Argentina ===
On 18 July 1994, there was an attack on the Argentine Israelite Mutual Association (AMIA) building in Buenos Aires, Argentina, which killed 85 people and injured hundreds. It was Argentina's deadliest bombing ever. Argentina accused Tehran in 2006 of being behind the attacks, and indicted several senior Iranian officials, including Hashemi Rafsanjani and Ahmad Vahidi, as well as Hezbollah's Imad Mughniyah.

The government of President Mauricio Macri revoked a memorandum of understanding that President Cristina Fernández de Kirchner had signed with Iran to pursue justice in joint cooperation. He declared Hezbollah as a terrorist organization in July 2019.

Since taking office in December 2023, President Javier Milei has been a vocal opponent of the Iranian government, accusing the country of the AMIA bombing and the 1992 Buenos Aires Israeli embassy bombing. He celebrated the assassination of Ali Khamenei during the 2026 Iran war and has maintained continuous support for military actions against the Iranian regime throughout the war. Milei also declared the Islamic Revolutionary Guard Corps a terrorist organization in April 2026.

=== Australia ===
In 2024, the Australian Security Intelligence Organisation (ASIO) stated that the Islamic Revolutionary Guard Corps (IRGC) at the direction of the Iranian government, organised and carried out at least two terrorist attacks within Australia. The first of the attacks occurred on 20 October 2024, when a group of arsonists led by Australian Sayid Moosawi conducted an attack on Lewis Continental Kitchen, a kosher restaurant in Sydney. The second attack took place on 6 December 2024, when another group of arsonists firebombed the Adass Israel Synagogue in Melbourne, injuring one congregation member and causing property damage. Australian Security Intelligence Organisation (ASIO) director Mike Burgess said he believes Iran was also responsible for more anti-Semitic attacks in the country.

On 27 November 2025, the Parliament of Australia formally listed the Islamic Revolutionary Guard Corps as a State Sponsor of Terrorism, under the framework of the Criminal Code Amendment (State Sponsors of Terrorism) Act 2025. The IRGC was the first entity to be designated as such, after the Minister of Home Affairs determined that it met the criteria specified in Division 110 of the code, thereby following the recommendations of Australian Government intelligence, security and policy agencies. According to the listing, it is "illegal to direct the activities of, be a member of, associate with members of, recruit for, train with, get funds to, from or for, or provide support to, the Iranian Revolutionary Guard Corp", with a penalty of 25 years of imprisonment.

=== Bahrain ===
On 30 September 2015, Bahraini security forces discovered a large bomb-making factory in Nuwaidrat and arrested a number of suspects linked to the Iranian Revolutionary Guards. The next day, 1 October, Bahrain recalled its ambassador to Iran and asked the Iranian acting charge d’affaires to leave the kingdom within 72 hours after he was declared persona non-grata. Bahrain's decision to recall its ambassador came "in light of continued Iranian meddling in the affairs of the kingdom of Bahrain in order to create sectarian strife and to impose hegemony and control.

On 6 January 2016, Bahrain said it had dismantled a terrorist cell allegedly linked to the Revolutionary Guards and Hezbollah. The Bahraini interior ministry said the cell was planning to carry out a “series of dangerous bombings” on the kingdom, and that many members were arrested including the group's leaders, 33-year-old twins Ali and Mohammed Fakhrawi.

=== Denmark ===
In October 2018, Denmark said the Iranian government intelligence service had tried to carry out a plot to assassinate an Iranian Arab opposition figure on its soil. The planned assassination was of an exiled leader of the Arab Struggle Movement for the Liberation of Ahvaz (ASMLA). Sweden extradited a Norwegian national of Iranian background to Denmark in connection with the foiled plot against the ASMLA leader. In February 2020 Denmark arrested three leading members of an (ASMLA) group on suspicion of spying for Saudi Arabia and for supporting an attack in Iran in 2018.

=== France ===
In October 2018 France froze Iranian financial assets in response to an alleged bomb plot to be carried out against an opposition group at a rally in Paris. The plot was said to be against the National Council of Resistance of Iran, which styles itself as Iran's government-in-exile. Assadollah Assadi, an Iranian diplomat in the Vienna embassy, was arrested in Germany in connection with the alleged plot to blow up a meeting of Iranian dissidents in Paris in June.

The rally was attended by an estimated 100,000 Iranians and hundreds of international dignitaries. A British Member of Parliament who attended said "Had the plot succeeded, it would have been the deadliest terror operation ever carried out in Europe. The US would undeniably have declared war on Iran – and it was only because the plot was foiled, world war three was averted." Belgian police had been informed of a possible attack on the rally, and found 550g (1lb 3oz) of explosive and a detonator in the car of Amir Saadouni and Nasimeh Naami. Saadouni, Naami, Assadi (believed to be the mastermind), and another Iranian went on trial in Antwerp on 27 November 2020. Court documents allege that Assadi was ordered by Iranian authorities to smuggle the explosives into Europe on a commercial flight, and give them to Saadouni and Naami, who were arrested two days later.

In February 2021 Belgian court in Antwerp sentenced Assadollah Assadi to 20-year jail term for this bomb plot. Amir Saadouni and Nasimeh Naami and a fourth man, Belgian-Iranian poet Merhad Arefani, who was arrested in Paris and accused of being an accomplice, were convicted of taking part in the plot and given jail terms of 15 to 18 years.

=== India ===
In July 2012, The Times of India reported that New Delhi police had concluded that terrorists belonging to a branch of Iran's military, the Iranian Revolutionary Guards, were responsible for an attack on 13 February 2012, during which a bomb explosion targeted an Israeli diplomat in New Delhi, India, wounding one embassy staff member, a local employee, and two passers-by. According to the report, the Islamic Revolutionary Guard Corps may have planned other attacks on Israeli targets around the world as well.

=== Israel and Palestine ===
Iran does not recognize Israel as a state, and provides support for Hamas, Hezbollah and Palestinian Islamic Jihad.

==== Hamas ====
Iran supplies political support and weapons to Hamas, an organization classified by Israel, the United States, the United Kingdom, Canada, the European Union, Egypt, Australia and Japan as a terrorist organization. Mahmoud Abbas, President of the Palestinian National Authority, has said "Hamas is funded by Iran. It claims it is financed by donations, but the donations are nothing like what it receives from Iran". From 2000 to 2004, Hamas was responsible for killing nearly 400 Israelis and wounding more than 2,000 in 425 attacks, according to the Israeli Ministry of Foreign Affairs. From 2001 through May 2008, Hamas launched more than 3,000 Qassam rockets and 2,500 mortar attacks into Israel.

Its most deadly attack was on 7 October 2023, when the group launched the worst terror attacks in the modern history of the state, the October 7 attacks on Israel, beginning with a barrage of at least 3,000 rockets, and assault by approximately 2,500 militants who breached the Gaza–Israel barrier, attacking military bases and massacring civilians in neighboring Israeli communities. At least 1,400 Israelis were killed.

==== Hezbollah ====
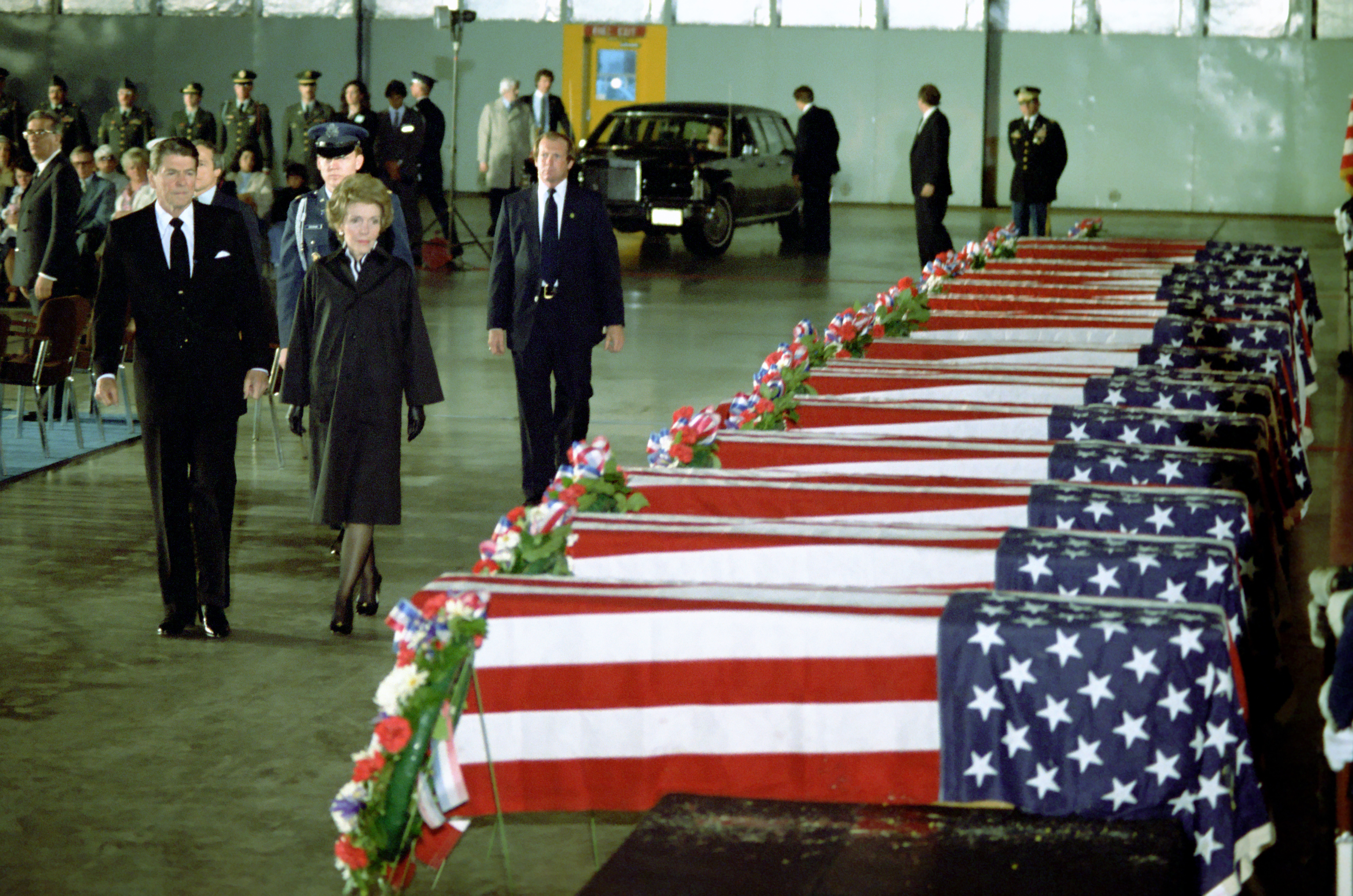
US President Ronald Reagan and his wife Nancy show respect to the victims of 1983 barracks bombing.

During the deployment of American troops in Lebanon during the Lebanese Civil War as part of the Multinational Force in Lebanon, Hezbollah, under the umbrella Islamic Jihad Organization, carried out attacks against American and Israeli troops in Lebanon with Iranian support, including the 1983 United States embassy bombing in Beirut and the Beirut barracks bombing. The U.S. maintains that the bombings were carried out with Iranian support. During the 1980s and 1990s, a wave of kidnappings, bombings, and assassinations of Western targets, particularly American and Israeli, occurred in Lebanon and other countries. The attacks, attributed to Hezbollah, have included:

- The Lebanon hostage crisis from 1982 to 1992.
- The 1982-1983 Tyre headquarters bombings
- The blowing up of a van filled with explosives in front of the U.S. embassy in Beirut killing 63 Americans and Lebanese in 1983.
- The 1983 Beirut barracks bombings
- The 1983 Kuwait bombings in collaboration with the Iraqi Dawa Party.
- The 1984 United States embassy annex bombing, killing 24 people.
- The hijacking of Kuwait Airways Flight 221
- The 1985 El Descanso bombing
- The 1985 attempted assassination of Jaber
- The hijacking of TWA flight 847 holding the 39 Americans on board hostage for weeks in 1985 and murder of one U.S. Navy sailor
- The Madrid airline office attacks
- The 1985 Copenhagen bombings
- The 1985–86 Paris attacks which killed 20 people and injured another 255.
- The hijacking of Iraqi Airways Flight 163
- The hijacking of Air Afrique Flight 056
- The hijacking of Kuwait Airways Flight 422 which left two dead
- The bombing of the Israeli Embassy in Argentina killing twenty-nine people in 1992. Hezbollah operatives boasted of involvement.
- The bombing of a Jewish community center in Argentina killing 85 people in 1994. Ansar Allah, a cover name for Hezbollah's external operations wing, claimed responsibility. Argentine justice accused Iran of being behind the attacks because of Buenos Aires' decision to suspend a nuclear material delivery and technology transfer.
- The 1994 AC Flight 901 attack, killing 21 people, in Panama. Ansar Allah expressed support for the attack in a possible claim to responsibility.
- The 1996 Khobar Towers bombing, killing 19 U.S. servicemen. On December 22, 2006, federal judge Royce C. Lamberth ruled that Iran was responsible for the attack, stating "The totality of the evidence at trial...firmly establishes that the Khobar Towers bombing was planned, funded, and sponsored by senior leadership in the government of the Islamic Republic of Iran. The defendants' conduct in facilitating, financing, and providing material support to bring about this attack was intentional, extreme, and outrageous."
- The Karbala provincial headquarters raid. On July 2, 2007, the U.S. military said that information from captured Hezbollah fighter Ali Musa Daqduq established a link between Quds Force and the Karbala raid. Daqduq worked as a liaison between Quds force and the Shia group that carried out the raid. According to the United States, Daqduq said that the Shia group "could not have conducted this complex operation without the support and direction of the Quds force."
- The 2012 Burgas bus bombing, killing 6, in Bulgaria. Hezbollah is believed to have carried out that attack on its own accord, without any Iranian involvement or foreknowledge.

Islamic Jihad is widely believed to be a nom de guerre of the Lebanese Islamist political movement and social service agency Hezbollah, which was founded in 1982 with many millions of dollars of aid and considerable training and logistical support from the Islamic Republic. Many believe the group promotes the Iranian agenda and that its goal is to overthrow the moderate governments in the Middle East and create Islamic Republics based on that of Iran as well as the destruction of Israel. Iran has supplied them with substantial amounts of financial, training, weapons (including long range rockets), explosives, political, diplomatic, and organizational aid while persuading Hezbollah to take action against Israel. Hezbollah's 1985 manifesto listed its four main goals as "Israel's final departure from Lebanon as a prelude to its final obliteration" According to reports released in February 2010, Hezbollah received $400 million from Iran.

Its methods include assassinations, kidnappings, suicide bombings, and guerrilla warfare. It is believed to be one of the Islamic resistance groups that made suicide bombings common use. Other attacks credited to Hezbollah include:

- Arrow Air Flight 1285 taking off from Gander, Newfoundland, crashes and burns about half a mile from the runway, killing all 256 passengers and crew on board. An anonymous caller to a French news agency in Beirut claimed that Islamic Jihad destroyed the plane to prove "our ability to strike at the Americans anywhere." An investigation by the Canadian Aviation Safety Board (CASB) found that the crash was most likely an accident. However, the minority report speculated that the in-flight fire "may have resulted from detonations of undetermined origin".
- According to a senior U.S. intelligence officer, the 2005 assassination of Lebanese Prime Minister Rafic Hariri was carried out by Hezbollah at the direction of Iranian intelligence agents.
- Firing of hundreds of rockets into northern Israel on a daily basis and capture of Israeli soldiers in 2006.
- Committing war crimes in Syria.

=== Shi'ite Militias in Iraq ===
Insurgents supported by Iran reportedly committed acts of terrorism. The United States State Department states that weapons are smuggled into Iraq and used to arm Iran's allies among the Shiite militias, including those of the anti-American cleric Muqtada al-Sadr and his Mahdi army.

During his address to the United States Congress on September 11, 2007, Commanding Officer for the United States forces in Iraq, General David Petraeus noted that the multinational forces in Iraq found that Iran's Quds Force had provided training, equipment, funding, and direction to Shi'ite militia groups. “When we captured the leaders of these so-called special groups … and the deputy commander of a Lebanese Hezbollah department that was created to support their efforts in Iraq, we’ve learned a great deal about how Iran has, in fact, supported these elements and how those elements have carried out violent acts against our forces, Iraqi forces and innocent civilians.”

In 2015, Michael Weiss and Michael Pregent accused the Popular Mobilization Units, an organization of 40 mainly-Shi'ite militias (some backed by Iran) of committing extensive atrocities against Sunni civilians in the course of their war against the Islamic State of Iraq and the Levant, including "burning people alive in their houses, playing soccer with severed human heads, and ethnically cleansing and razing whole villages to the ground." Weiss and Pregent even suggested that "Iran's Shi'ite militias aren't a whole lot better than the Islamic State."

=== Kenya ===
Aggrey Adoli, police chief in Kenya's coastal region, said on 22 June 2012 that two Iranians, Ahmad Abolfathi Mohammad and Sayed Mansour Mousavi, believed to be members of Iran's Revolutionary Guards' Quds Force, were arrested and suspected of being involved in terrorism. One of the Iranians led counter-terrorism officers to recover 15 kilograms of a powdery substance believed to be explosive. The two Iranians allegedly admitted to plotting to attack United States, Israeli, Saudi, or British targets in Kenya. In court, Police Sgt. Erick Opagal, an investigator with Kenya's Anti-Terrorism Police Unit, said that the two Iranians had shipped over 100 kilograms of powerful explosives into Kenya.

It was later revealed that the targets included Gil Haskel, Israel's ambassador to Kenya. During a visit to Kenya in August, Israeli Deputy Foreign Minister Danny Ayalon praised Kenya for its efforts in stopping Iranian terror threats against Israeli and Jewish targets. Uganda, Ethiopia, and Kenya all expressed concern with Ayalon regarding Iran's attempts to increase terror activity in Africa.

=== Netherlands ===
In 2025, Iran's ambassador to the Netherlands was summoned after Dutch intelligence linked Tehran to two assassination attempts in Europe, including a 2024 attack in Haarlem and a 2023 attempt on Spanish politician Alejo Vidal-Quadras, blaming Iran's use of criminal networks to target regime opponents.

=== Sweden ===
According to Doku.nu, two men in Sweden, Mohammad Heidari and Shayan Tousynezhad, are linked to Iran's Revolutionary Guard and allegedly used false identities to gain asylum. Despite warnings from German authorities and suspicions they planned to target Swedish Jews, they were granted residency and are believed to pose a threat to Swedish security and the Iranian diaspora. Experts warn they may be part of a broader network of Iranian agents operating in Sweden.

=== Thailand ===
On 14 February 2012, a series of explosions occurred in Bangkok, Thailand. Thai authorities said that the bombings were a botched attempt by Iranian nationals to assassinate Israeli diplomats. Several Iranians were arrested and charged for the attacks, one of whom was badly injured.

=== United States ===
In August 2022, the U.S. Department of Justice charged an Iranian operative (Shahram Poursafi) with "plotting to assassinate former President Donald Trump's national security advisor John Bolton." Poursafi, a member of Iran's Islamic Revolutionary Guard Corps, was charged for "providing and attempting to provide material support to a transnational murder plot". According to reports, Mike Pompeo was also a target, where a bounty of $1 million was placed for his murder.

Masih Alinejad, a journalist and human rights activist, has been a target of Iranian theocracy since fleeing Iran in 2009. In 2021, the FBI intercepted a kidnapping plot against her by Iranian agents who had planned to kidnap her from her New York home. U.S. prosecutors charged an Iranian intelligence officer for the kidnapping plot. In 2022, U.S. police arrested a man who had tried to break into Alinejad's Brooklyn home while in possession of an AK47.

The United States State Department has accused Iranian-backed Iraqi Shia militias of terrorism against U.S. troops, and Iran of cyberterrorism, primarily through its Quds Force. Recent Iranian state-sponsored activity has included destructive malware and ransomware operations. The Office of the Director of National Intelligence's threat assessment concluded that "Iran’s growing expertise and willingness to conduct aggressive cyber operations make it a major threat to the security of U.S. and allied networks and data. Iran’s opportunistic approach to cyber attacks makes critical infrastructure owners in the United States susceptible to being targeted". According to reports in May 2026, Iranian lawmaker Ebrahim Azizi said that a plan called "Counter-Action by the Military and Security Forces of the Islamic Republic" had been drafted, including a reward of €50 million to whoever kills President Trump. This report followed earlier reports of rewards for the assassination of Trump and Israeli Prime Minister Benjamin Netanyahu, as well as similar reports dating back to 2020.

=== Venezuela ===
In January 2020, Juan Guaidó, President of the National Assembly of Venezuela, accused Nicolás Maduro of allowing Qasem Soleimani and his Quds Forces to incorporate their sanctioned banks and their companies in Venezuela. Guaidó also said that Soleimani "led a criminal and terrorist structure in Iran that for years caused pain to his people and destabilized the Middle East, just as Abu Mahdi al-Muhandis did with Hezbollah."

Aeroterror, knownly referred to as "ghost flights", describes alleged ongoing unregistered flights between Venezuela and Iran. These flights, reportedly operated primarily by the Venezuelan state-owned carrier Conviasa, have attracted international attention due to the absence of publicly available records such as passenger manifests and recurring allegations of illicit activities, including terrorism.

== Alleged al-Qaeda ties ==
According to several sources, al-Qaeda and Iran allegedly formed an alliance during the 1990s in which Hezbollah trained al-Qaeda operatives. This partnership was initially formed in Sudan. After several meetings facilitated by the Sudanese government in 1992, Iranian officials offered to provide al-Qaeda fighters with tactical training and intelligence co-operation in activities against the Israeli government. Iranian government also entered into an agreement with al-Qaeda to supply the organization with financial support, weaponry, and explosives through the involvement of Lebanese Hezbollah group.

During the Bosnian War, the IRGC worked alongside the Bosnian mujahideen, including several volunteers of al-Qaeda. Between 1992 and 1995, military co-operation between Iranian intelligence agencies and al-Qaeda strengthened, as Iran began sending large amounts of ammunitions, weapon shipments, and supplies to Bosnia through Sudan-based charity organizations affiliated with al-Qaeda.

After the September 11 attacks, the Iranian government attempted to suppress information regarding its past relations with al-Qaeda. Iran detained hundreds of al-Qaeda operatives that entered the country following the U.S. invasion of Afghanistan in 2001; even though "the Iranian government has held most of them under house arrest, limited their freedom of movement, and closely monitored their activities," U.S. officials have expressed concerns that Iran has not fully accounted for their whereabouts, culminating in allegations of Iranian complicity in the 2003 Riyadh compound bombings.

At various time periods between 2001 and 2010, several al-Qaeda leaders, including Saif Al-Adel, Saad bin Laden, Abu Muhammad al-Masri, and Abu Musab Al-Zarqawi, were given asylum in Iran. A UN report published in July 2018 stated that al-Qaeda leaders based in Iran had become "more prominent" within the group, exerting greater influence over the operations of al-Qaeda's networks. In August 2020, al-Qaeda leader Abu Muhammad al-Masri and his daughter Miriam were killed by Israeli agents in Tehran. In January 2021, U.S. Secretary of State Mike Pompeo accused Iran of allowing al-Qaeda to establish their base of operations within the country, though they denied the claim.

With the killing of Ayman al-Zawahiri in July 2022, analysts believed that leadership of al-Qaeda would pass onto Saif al-Adel, who as of then was reportedly still in Iran. In February 2023, a United Nations Security Council report named Adel as the de facto leader of al-Qaeda, and that his presence in Iran and issues with open acknowledgement of al-Qaeda activity in Taliban-governed Afghanistan restricted him from being publicly named as leader. Adel's presence in Iran was reconfirmed by the Security Council in a report from 2024, with the United States backing both assessments.

=== 1998 United States embassy bombings ===
On November 8, 2011, Judge John D. Bates stated in a U.S. federal court that Iran was liable for the 1998 United States embassy bombings in Kenya and Tanzania. In his 45-page decision, Judge Bates wrote that "...the government of Iran aided, abetted and conspired with Hezbollah, Osama Bin Laden, and al Qaeda to launch large-scale bombing attacks against the United States by utilizing the sophisticated delivery mechanism of powerful suicide truck bombs. ... Prior to their meetings with Iranian officials and agents Bin Laden and al Qaeda did not possess the technical expertise required to carry out the embassy bombings in Nairobi and Dar es Salaam."

=== USS Cole bombing ===
In March 2015, U.S. federal judge Rudolph Contreras found both Iran and Sudan complicit in the 2000 bombing of the USS Cole by al Qaeda, stating that "Iran was directly involved in establishing al-Qaeda's Yemen network and supported training and logistics for Al-Qaeda in the Gulf region" through Hezbollah. Two previous federal judges had ruled that Sudan was liable for its role in the attack, but Contreras's "ruling is the first to find Iran partly responsible for the incident."

=== September 11 attacks ===
The U.S. indictment of bin Laden filed in 1998 stated that al-Qaeda "forged alliances ... with the government of Iran and its associated terrorist group Hezbollah for the purpose of working together against their perceived common enemies." On May 31, 2001, Steven Emerson and Daniel Pipes wrote in The Wall Street Journal that "Officials of the Iranian government helped arrange advanced weapons and explosives training for Al-Qaeda personnel in Lebanon where they learned, for example, how to destroy large buildings."

The 9/11 Commission Report stated that 8 to 10 of the hijackers on 9/11 previously passed through Iran and their travel was facilitated by Iranian border guards. The report also found "circumstantial evidence that senior Hezbollah operatives were closely tracking the travel of some of these future muscle hijackers into Iran in November 2000."

Two defectors from Iran's intelligence service testified that Iranian officials had "foreknowledge of the 9/11 attacks." By contrast, the 9/11 Commission "found no evidence that Iran or Hezbollah was aware of the planning for what later became the 9/11 attack. At the time of their travel through Iran, the al Qaeda operatives themselves were probably not aware of the specific details of their future operation." In addition, both Ramzi bin al-Shibh and Khalid Sheikh Mohammed denied "any relationship between the hijackers and Hezbollah" and "any other reason for the hijackers' travel to Iran" besides "taking advantage of the Iranian practice of not stamping Saudi passports."

=== Riyadh compound bombings ===
According to Seth G. Jones and Peter Bergen, the 2003 Riyadh compound bombings were planned by al Qaeda operatives in Iran, with apparent support from the Iranian government. In May 2003, then-State Department official Ryan Crocker provided information on the upcoming attack to Iranian officials, who apparently took no action.

=== Opposing view ===
British journalist Abdel Bari Atwan asserted in 2006 that Al-Qaeda's Iraq branch regarded Shia civilians as "legitimate targets for acts of violence". During the early Iraqi insurgency, Al-Qaeda in Iraq publicly declared war against the Iran-backed Badr Brigades, a group which was co-operating with the United States during that time.

A West Point study based on documents uncovered in Osama bin Laden's compound in Abbottabad found that the Iran-al Qaeda "relationship is not one of alliance, but of indirect and unpleasant negotiations over the release of detained jihadis and their families, including members of bin Laden's family." According to longtime Central Intelligence Agency (CIA) analyst Bruce Riedel: "Rather than being secretly in bed with each other as some have argued, al Qaeda had a fairly hostile relationship with the Iranian regime. To get members of his family out of Iran, for example, bin Laden had an Iranian diplomat kidnapped and then traded. The Iranians released some of his family members in the deal but then double-crossed al Qaeda by not letting one of his daughters, Fatima, free." Similarly, American journalist Steve Coll asserted that bin Laden "was as paranoid about Iran as he was about the C.I.A. He worried that Iranian doctors might use medical treatment as a pretense to inject his sons with tracking chips."

== Taliban insurgency ==
Iran does not designate the Taliban as a terrorist organization, and the IRGC actively opposed any U.S. presence in Afghanistan. American and British officials have accused Iran in the past of giving weapons and support to the Taliban insurgency. Due to the Taliban takeover of Afghanistan, Iran had to close some of its consulates in that country, but kept the embassy open. Unlike the tense relationship between the two sides in the 1990s, Iran competed with Pakistan in giving support to the reestablished Taliban government.

== Support for Islamist militant groups ==
According to both the United States Department of Defense and Department of State, Iran has arbitrarily funded armed militant groups throughout the Muslim World, many of which adhere to Islamism. As a result of support for several designated terrorist group such as Hezbollah, Hamas, the Taliban, and the Palestinian Islamic Jihad, the U.S. has designated Iran as a state sponsor of terror. Iran has also allegedly forged ties with al-Qaeda and thus supported the September 11 attacks and its perpetrators according to the 9/11 Commission.

The extent of Iran's support to Islamist and terrorist groups has been subject to debate, however, it is known that Iran has supported mainly anti-American groups such as Hezbollah, rejectionist groups in Palestine such as Hamas, the Islamic Jihad Movement in Palestine, and others, as well as other groups including the Popular Mobilization Forces, several Bahraini militias, the Houthis, and the Taliban that together form the Axis of Resistance alongside the Iraqi, and Russian governments. Iran uses the axis of resistance as a proxy force, fighting in Lebanon, Syria, Yemen, and Iraq, and with militias collaborating with one another.

In July 2025, it was reported that Iran had escalated its support for regional proxy forces by continuing to supply advanced weaponry to groups such as the Houthis in Yemen and Hezbollah in Lebanon. According to the United States Central Command, US-allied forces in Yemen intercepted a shipment of approximately 750 tons of Iranian arms in late June near waters controlled by the Houthis. The shipment reportedly included anti-ship and anti-aircraft missiles, drone components, warheads, and instruction manuals written in Farsi. This cache has been cited by US officials as further evidence of Tehran's continued involvement in arming proxy groups, reportedly through networks linked to the Islamic Revolutionary Guard Corps (IRGC). At the same time, Western intelligence and regional sources have indicated that Iran is working to replenish Hezbollah's arsenal in Lebanon, with weapons transported through Iraq and Syria to replace losses sustained during the group's 2024 conflict with Israel. According to the Wall Street Journal and regional officials, Hezbollah's supply lines have been disrupted by the fall of Syria's former government and increased border enforcement. Despite economic and military strain following its confrontation with Israel, analysts say Iran continues to prioritize the resupply of its allied militia networks as part of its broader regional strategy.

On 11 March 2026, Hezbollah leader Naim Qassem expressed his support for newly appointed Iranian supreme leader, Mojtaba Khamenei. On 1 April 2026, Mojtaba sent a letter to Naim Qassem, promising continued Iranian support for Hezbollah.

=== Syria ===
Prior to the fall of the Assad regime in December 2024, Iran used many militias from its Axis of Resistance as a proxy force in order to support the regime of Bashar al-Assad. Assad and Iran held close ties, in part due to their anti-American stance. Iran aided Syria in their crackdown of the Syrian revolution, and eventually sent troops to support the government.

Lebanese Hezbollah and its Syrian counterpart was used as a proxy within Syria, to attack Iran's and Syria's enemies such as Israel, and the rebels. Hezbollah also engaged in smaller clashes with Turkey. Iran and Hezbollah both also created, funded, and armed several paramilitaries and militias within Syria loyal to the Assad Regime, as well as overseeing the involvement of other militias from Iraq, Palestine, and Lebanon. Iran also formed militias for fighters from Afghanistan and Pakistan, under the banners of Liwa Fatemiyoun and Liwa Zainebiyoun.

With the fall of Assad regime, Iran's use of Syria as a base for its Axis of Resistance has been significantly disrupted, with Hezbollah withdrawing to Lebanon and Iraqi militias retreating to Iraq following the opposition offensives. Despite these setbacks, Iran-backed groups continue to operate in some parts of Syria. The Islamic Resistance Front in Syria, established by the Syrian Social Nationalist Party (SSNP), has emerged as a militant organization opposing the new government, foreign influence, and Israeli occupation. However, its activities and scale remain very limited compared to Iran's former proxy network under Assad.

=== Iraq ===
Iran has been heavily involved in Iraq since the 2003 invasion that toppled Saddam Hussein from power. Iran has often used Shia militias within Iraq to disrupt American operations, while also directly participating in the insurgency that followed the invasion. Iran mainly funded the Mahdi Army, a group led by Muqtada al-Sadr. Iran has also been heavily involved with the founding of the Popular Mobilization Forces and their effort to fight the Islamic State within Iraq, fighting alongside them and the axis of resistance.

=== Afghanistan ===
In August 2020, U.S. intelligence officials assessed that Iran offered bounties to the Taliban-linked Haqqani network to kill foreign servicemembers, including Americans, in Afghanistan. U.S. intelligence determined that Iran paid bounties to Taliban insurgents for the 2019 attack on Bagram airport. According to CNN, Donald Trump's administration has "never mentioned Iran's connection to the bombing, an omission current and former officials said was connected to the broader prioritization of the peace agreement and withdrawal from Afghanistan."

=== Palestine ===
Iran is known to fund several Palestinian militant groups, many of them members of the Alliance of Palestinian Forces. These groups, all of them espousing Anti-Zionism, are known to attack Israeli civilians within Israeli territory and are known to use terrorism. Iran itself has also been directly involved in several conflicts against Israel, including in 2018 and 2023.

Hamas is the main proxy group funded and armed by Iran, based in the Gaza Strip, which it governs. It has engaged Israeli forces in direct combat several times in Gaza, with it also being notorious for its antisemitism and attacks against Israeli civilians. Alongside Hamas, Iran is also known to fund Hamas-allied Palestinian Islamic Jihad, the Popular Front for the Liberation of Palestine, the Democratic Front for the Liberation of Palestine, and the Sabireen Movement, all of which are based in the Gaza Strip and have engaged Israeli forces. Iran also formerly supported the Popular Resistance Committees up until 2013, when relations were ruptured following the PRC's support of the Syrian opposition.

The Popular Front for the Liberation of Palestine – General Command and Free Palestine Movement, based in Syria, are also known to receive aid from Iran and the Syrian government.

== Other allegations ==
Along with the above allegations, Iran is also accused of other acts of terrorism. Including:

- Mykonos restaurant assassinations. On September 17, 1992, Iranian-Kurdish insurgent leaders Sadegh Sharafkandi, Fattah Abdoli, Homayoun Ardalan and their translator Nouri Dehkordi were assassinated at the Mykonos Greek restaurant in Berlin, Germany. In the Mykonos trial, the courts found Kazem Darabi, an Iranian national who worked as a grocer in Berlin, and Lebanese Abbas Rhayel, guilty of murder and sentenced them to life in prison. Two other Lebanese, Youssef Amin and Mohamed Atris, were convicted of being accessories to murder. In its 10 April 1997 ruling, the court issued an international arrest warrant for Iranian intelligence minister Hojjat al-Islam Ali Fallahian after declaring that the assassination had been ordered by him with knowledge of supreme leader Grand Ayatollah Ali Khamenei and president Ayatollah Rafsanjani.
- The sponsorship of at least thirty terrorist attacks between 2011 and 2013 "in places as far flung as Thailand, New Delhi, Lagos, and Nairobi", including a 2011 plot to assassinate the Saudi Arabian ambassador to the U.S. and bomb the Israeli and Saudi embassies in Washington, D.C.

== Public responses in Iran ==
During the 2025–2026 protests in Iran, demonstrators also criticized the government's foreign policy and its support for groups abroad. Protesters in Tehran and other cities chanted slogans such as "Neither Gaza nor Lebanon, My Life for Iran," a phrase used since 2009 to express opposition to Iran's backing of groups such as Hezbollah and Hamas.

== List of entities with alleged ties to Iran ==
Group	Type	Active regions	Recognized as a terrorist group by	References
Al-Ashtar Brigades	Shia Islamist paramilitary force	Bahrain	Bahrain; Canada; Egypt; Saudi Arabia; United Arab Emirates; United Kingdom; United States	
Asa'ib Ahl al-Haq	Shia Islamist paramilitary force	Iraq	United Arab Emirates; United States	
Kata'ib Sayyid al-Shuhada	Shia Islamist paramilitary force	Iraq	United States	
Badr Organization	Islamist political party	Iraq	United Arab Emirates	
Hamas	Sunni Islamist political party and militant group	Gaza Strip	Entire organization: Australia; Canada; European Union; Israel; Japan; Paraguay; United Kingdom; United States; New Zealand; Argentina; Germany; Switzerland; France; Italy; Military wing only: Egypt	
Harakat al-Nujaba	Shia Islamist paramilitary force	Iraq	United States	
Hezbollah	Shia Islamist political party and militant group	Lebanon	Entire organization: Arab League; Argentina; Australia; Bahrain; Canada; Colombia; Germany; Gulf Cooperation Council; Israel; Japan; Malaysia; Netherlands; Honduras; Serbia; Slovenia; Lithuania; Guatemala; Estonia; Paraguay; Saudi Arabia; Switzerland; United Arab Emirates; United Kingdom; United States; Military wing only: European Union; France; Kosovo; New Zealand	
Houthis	Zaydi Islamist political party and militant group	Yemen	Yemen (Alimi led government); Malaysia; Bahrain; Australia; Canada; New Zealand; Israel; Saudi Arabia; United Kingdom; United Arab Emirates; United States (2021, again from 2024−Current)	
Palestinian Islamic Jihad	Islamist paramilitary force	Gaza Strip	Australia; Canada; European Union; Israel; Japan; New Zealand; United Kingdom; United States	
/ Kata'ib Hezbollah	Shia Islamist paramilitary force	Iraq	United Arab Emirates; United States	
Liwa Fatemiyoun	Shia Islamist paramilitary force	Ba'athist Syria Afghanistan	United States; Canada	
Saraya al-Mukhtar	Shia Islamist paramilitary force	Bahrain	Bahrain; Egypt; Saudi Arabia; United Arab Emirates; United Kingdom; United States	

== See also ==
- Iran–Saudi Arabia proxy conflict
- Greater Iran
- Shia crescent
- Israel and state-sponsored terrorism
- Pakistan and state-sponsored terrorism
- India and state-sponsored terrorism
- Qatar and state-sponsored terrorism
- Terrorism and the Soviet Union
- United States and state-sponsored terrorism
- Kazem Rajavi
- Abdul Rahman Ghassemlou
- Mohammad Hossein Naghdi
- Iranian external operations
- List of Iranian assassinations
- Hybrid warfare against Iran
- Cyberwarfare and Iran
- Naji Sharifi-Zindashti
