= Radical Islam: The Iranian Mojahedin =

1989 book on Iranian politics by Ervand Abrahamian

- Author: Ervand Abrahamian
- Language: English
- Series: Society and Culture in the Modern Middle East
- Release number: 3
- Subject: Political history of Iran
- Genre: Nonfiction
- Publisher: I.B. Tauris, Yale University Press
- Publication date: 1989; 28 October 1992 (YUP)
- Media type: Print (Hardcover and Paperback)
- Pages: 315 pages, 5½ x 8½
- ISBN: 9781850430773 (Hardcover); 9781850430834 (Paperback); 9780300052671 (YUP)
- OCLC: 17586359
- Dewey Decimal: 322.420955 ABR
- Preceded by: Iran Between Two Revolutions
- Followed by: Khomeinism

Radical Islam: The Iranian Mojahedin is a book by historian Ervand Abrahamian about the late 20th-century political history of Iran, and a thorough case study of the People's Mujahedin of Iran (MEK). The book also includes a short biography of Ali Shariati and a review of his works in order to explore the influence this had on the group's early ideological traits. The book was a duplicate publication by I.B. Tauris and by Yale University Press, being first published by the former in 1989 in the United Kingdom. It is widely regarded as an important academic source on the MEK.

== Sources used ==
Many sources used for the book are in Persian language. In order to study the MEK, Abrahamian has mainly relied on the pamphlets and other publications of the group. The pamphlets were both on political and philosophical subjects. Other printed sources used were Iranian press, as well as those of Western countries such as the United Kingdom and the United States.

He also made lengthy personal interviews with several former and preset members of the MEK, including the group's leader Massoud Rajavi.

== Publication history ==
The book was first published in 1989 by I.B. Tauris & Co., Ltd., an independent publishing house specializing on the Middle East (currently an imprint of the Bloomsbury Publishing) on its 'Society and Culture in the Modern Middle East' series. It was then published by Yale University Press in New Haven, Connecticut on 28 October 1992.

== Content ==
Contents

Part I: State and Society

1. The Pahlavi Monarchy
2. The Islamic Republic

Part II: The Mojahedin

3. The Beginnings
4. Ali Shariati
5. The Formative Years
6. The Great Schism
7. The Great Release
8. To the Masses
9. The Road to Karbala
10. Social Bases
11. Exile

The book is divided into two parts and eleven chapters. Part I reviews history of Iran under the rule of Pahlavi dynasty and then Iranian Revolution and the first decade of the country under the Government of the Islamic Republic of Iran, while more-lengthy Part II details the development and experiences of the MEK, covering more than a quarter-century from its origins in the early 1960s up until its transformation in the late 1980s. It also features cogent analyses of the MEK's social background, social bases, and ideology, including how the MEK's original aim was "to synthesize the religious values of Islam with the scientific thought of Marxism" and how it injected new meanings and dimensions to old Islamic terms and symbols. A whole chapter is dedicated to a biography of Ali Shariati and an investigation of his works and views, to further discuss their impact on the ideology of the MEK. Other themes explored are the group's leadership, structure and electoral performance, the latter during 1979–1981. Included in the book are also several comprehensive lists of MEK members, with extensive biographical information. The book also discusses the split within the Mojahedin in 1975 ("The Great Schism") that resulted in "a division among the membership between Islamic Mojahedin and Marxist Mojahedin." The book also explains how, despite the schism, the Mojahedin became what Ayatollah Mohammad Beheshti described as one of the three foundations of the Islamic revolution: "Imam Khomeini, Ali Shariati, and the Mojahedin Organization". The remaining of the book explains the problems that the Mojahedin (as well as other resistance groups) had to face after Khomeini and the religious party took power and how initially the Mojahedin tried to cooperate with the new regime, but it soon became clear that the Islamic Republic would not accept a democratic multiparty system.

Thought the book, Abrahamian argues that the MEK had been established by middle-class intelligentsia and young people profoundly affected by the country's inequalities and oppression who played an important part in toppling the Pahlavi administration and winning the support and respect of many Iranians. Then, how after the Iranian revolution, the MEK quickly emerged as one of the biggest and better-organized parties in Iran, with their rallies drawing tens of thousands of participants. Abrahamian then explains how the Khomeini regime oppressed the MEK by executing and imprisoning thousands MEK members and sympathizers that rallied against the new regime. and concludes that the Khomeini regime was successful in dealing with the MEK's public support because it suppressed anti-government manifestations with "brute violence". During the Iranian revolution, the Mojahedin emerged as a viable and popular organization that played a crucial role in overthrowing the Shah's government. Then Abrahamian describes the evolutionary nature of the Mojahedin's ideology, which is considered one of the most important contributions of the book. Before and after the 1979 Iranian revolution, political opponents to the MEK often stigmatized it as “Marxist or Islamic Marxist” to the point that such pejorative denominations became common in stereotyping the organization in the media and academia. According to Abrahamian, the MEK's influence is instead better understood through the analysis of its “conscious self-identification with Shi’a Islam”, which had origins in Iran's urban and middle-class culture. The MEK did support and adapted Marxist social ideas (mainly about class struggle) to “fashion a materialistic interpretation of Islamic history”, but never described themselves as Marxist. According to Abrahamian, the MEK's revolutionary version of Islam differed sharply from Ayatollah Khomeini's new populist Islam. It is also considered critical of the ruling clerics in Iran, as well as militarization of the MEK and its refuge in Iraq.

In the later chapters of the book, Abrahamian examines the MEK's social background and ideology in detail, gathering and analysing a large amount of data in the context of the Iranian state and society. Abrahamian concludes that though the MEK claimed Shii Islam was “a inherently revolutionary movement”, it did not consider that the Islamic Revolution could also become a clerical revolution. According to David Menashri, Abrahamian's attempts at charting the history of a still-active underground movement is one of the reasons why the book's picture on the MEK does not seem complete.

== Reception ==
=== Academic reviews ===
Sepehr Zabih opined that the book is “a valuable addition to the literature on the Iranian Left”, but it criticized it for not analysing in more depth aspects like voting data during the Iranian revolution.

Misagh Parsa said that the book is a superb analysis of the MEK as an important Islamic movement. The book covers a broad picture of Iranian politics, also observing the actions of the Pahlavi and the Islamic Republic regimes. Parsa finds that “while one may disagree with some of his concepts, statistics, and interpretations, Abrahamian has made an indisputable contribution to understanding not only the Mojahedin, but also Iranian politics and theories of the state and ideology in general.”

Eric Hooglund finds the book "very important", "rich in details" and "must reading for anyone who is interested in contemporary Iran" in his review for Iranian Studies. According to Hooglund, the book's most important contribution is its analysis of the MEK's ideology (before and after the revolution), something that had been “shrouded in mystery, misconceptions and deliberate misinformation.”

Reza Afshari's review in Middle East Studies Association Bulletin indicates that conclusions made by Abrahamian on his examination of the social bases of the MEK, is consistent with findings of other scholars studying Islamist movements in other countries. He points that the author "richly narrates" the history of the MEK, but "may have inflated the extent of mass support".

Mansour Farhang describes the work as a "learned, lucid and cogent piece" and also a "masterful exposé" of MEK's history in a review published by Middle East Report. He specifically finds the part discussing Ali Shariati and his relationship to the MEK's ideology a strength for the book. According to Farhand, "Abrahamian does not impose labels on complex phenomena” but “meticulously probes the anatomy of the Mojahedin and the course of its development.

Oliver Leaman, in his review for British Society for Middle Eastern Studies Bulletin, praises Abrahamian for his detailed and in-depth discussions, describing the book as "a highly successful blend of historical analysis and political understanding" and "an exceptionally interesting book on a difficult subject". He acknowledges that the book could have benefited from further analysis of the relationship between the MEK and Iraq or comparing the MEK's activities with those of other revolutionary groups in different countries. Leaman concludes that the disadvantages "reduce the scope, but not the quality, of this remarkable book".

A. R. H. Kellas says in his Asian Affairs review that the book is "one of the best of so many books about Iran today" and applauds it for "thoughtful analysis" and "sympathetic understanding of Iranian society". According to him, background of the author imposes no religious prejudices in investigating the MEK. He also finds combined usage of Iranian and Western sources, another advantage.

Anthony Hyman opined in International Affairs that “this is the most objective and comprehensive study available of this important Iranian movement from its origins to present”, where the author aims to remain objective without seeking to judge the group.

Mangol Bayat calls it "a sober, and sobering, account of the history" and "of great importance to all historians of modern Iran and modern Islamic political movements" in The American Historical Review. Regarding the author's bias, Bayat opines "indeed, he refrains from doing so [writing partially] whenever possible."

In reviewing the work for Die Welt des Islams, Michel M. Mazzaoui describes the book as the second volume for Abrahamian's Iran Between Two Revolutions (1982) and concludes that "there is very little to criticize in this masterfully written piece of current research. Dr. Abrahamian writes sympathetically and at times dramatically—but always as an accomplished scholar". According to Mazzaoui, the author has most certainly did his best to be unbiased and leave the final judgment for the reader.

David Menashri, writing a review for Middle Eastern Studies, says the author's approach is "quite distinctive" and successful in answering questions by clarifying major aspects of the Iranian Revolution. According to Menashri, the book is a "pioneering study" and a "unique contribution", in particular the MEK's social background in the context of political, social, ideological, economic, and international developments. He also maintains that despite the MEK's importance, little had been written about them, and much of it had been ‘polemical, misleading and sometimes simply wrong’. Menashri says that the Abrahamian succeeded in answering the questions that the author set out to analyse: “the social background of the organization’s founders”; “the main feature of the ideology”; “how they managed to attract ‘a mass following’ but failed to gain political power”; and “what the appeal of Mojahedin was and what groups in particular were drawn towards its ranks”. Menashri concludes that the book is "highly valuable and extremely helpful in enabling a better understanding of this movement [=MEK]".

In a review published by Journal of the American Academy of Religion, William R. Darrow comments that the author's discussion of Ali Shariati's works and their relationship with the MEK's ideology is notable, praising the "very useful book" for paying attention to both ideology and organization of the group in the analyses.

Asef Bayat wrote in 1990 that "by far the best discussion of Shariati" was offered by Abrahamian in this book.

=== Other reviews ===
D. Pipes wrote in Choice Reviews that the book "has its share of problems, but, as the first full-length treatment of this topic, it is enormously valuable for the masses of data it brings to light and for its insights into the vagaries of life in the Iranian opposition".

A review of the book published by The Economist, says the "book is important and useful not only because it is the first in English on its subject, but also because... it is objective", and also finds the fact that the author is an ethnic Armenian, not a Shia, worth noting.

Writing for the Israeli newspaper The Jerusalem Post, Nissim Rejwan opined that Abrahamian's book offers useful insights on the MEK movement, telling "the story of the revolution from the inside".

In 1990, Association of Committed Professors of Iranian Universities, a UK-based organization affiliated with the MEK self-published a 96-page critique titled Facts and Myths on the People's Mojahedin of Iran with the explanatory title Examples of the Lies, Distortions, and Fabrications in Ervand Abrahamian's The Iranian Mojahedin. According to authors Boer, Tom de; Zieck, Marjoleine, this critique included ad hominem of Abrahamian.

== See also ==
- List of works about the People's Mujahedin of Iran
