= Roksana Bahramitash =

Canadian sociologist

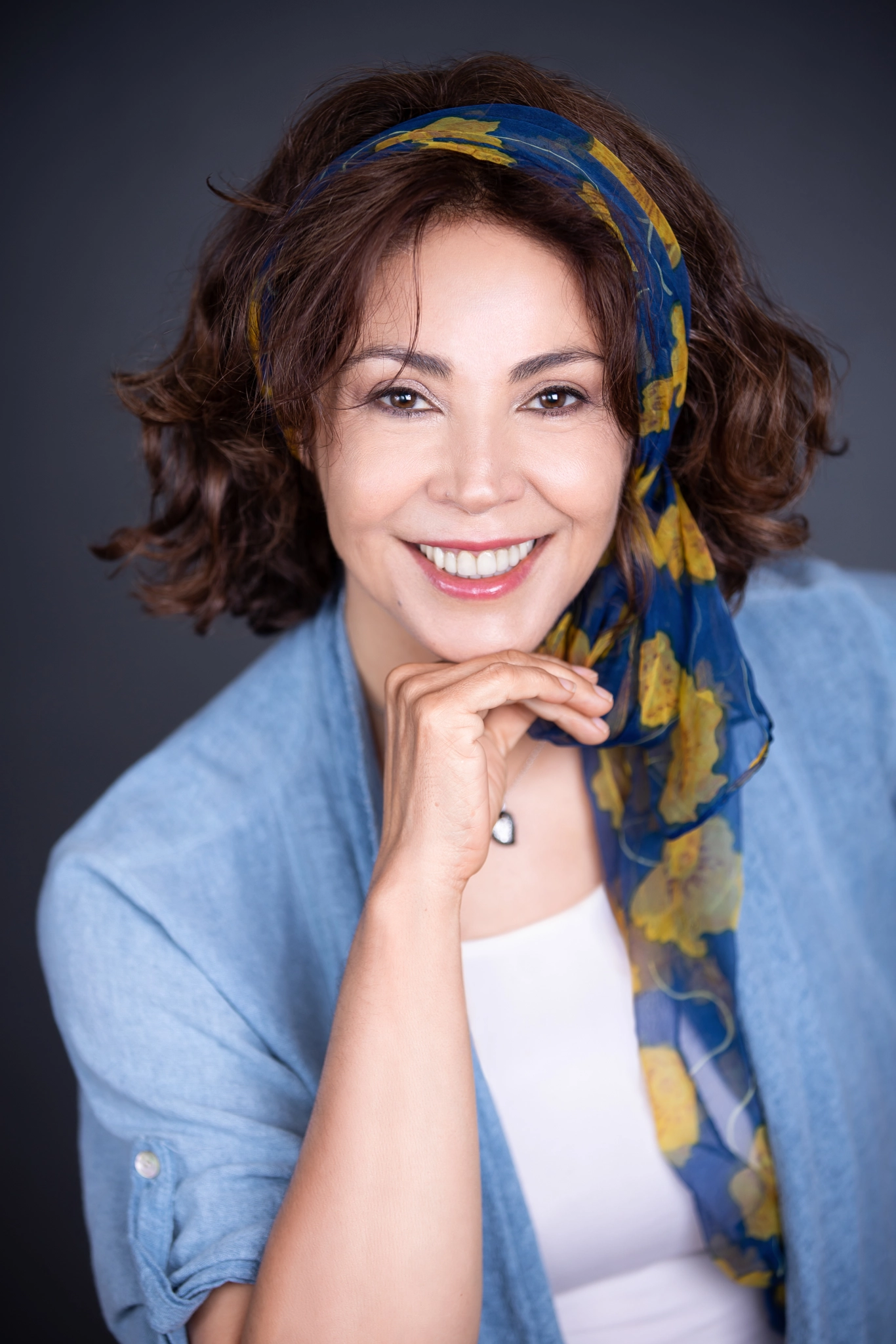
- Born: Iran

Academic background
- Education: McGill University

Academic work
- Institutions: Concordia University, Simon Fraser University
- Main interests: Sociology
- Notable ideas: Women, employment and the informal economy in the Middle East and North Africa (MENA)
- Website: https://roksanabahramitash.wordpress.com

Roksana Bahramitash (/bəˌrɑːmɪˈtɑːʃ/; Persian: رکسانا بهرامی‌تاش;) is an Iranian-born Canadian sociologist and author. Her work focuses on women, employment and the informal economy in the Middle East and North Africa (MENA), as well as gender segregation in Islam, and microeconomics. In post-revolution Iran, Bahramitash was working on improving peasant women's literacy and access to economic development resources.

== Early life and education ==
She placed second in nationwide Iranian university entrance exams, and attended universities in Iran, where she earned both her bachelor's and master's degrees in sociology. Bahramitash came to Canada in 1991 to complete her PhD in sociology from McGill University in Montreal, Quebec.

Bahramitash eventually settled in Montreal, Canada as a citizen, where she has done post-doctoral work at the Simone de Beauvoir Institute, Concordia University in Montreal and Simon Fraser University.

== Career ==
Bahramitash has held lecturing and research positions at McGill and Concordia Universities, and the University of Montreal. She is the producer of a documentary film entitled Beyond the Bourqa, a documentary film made about women's changing lives during the War in Afghanistan. A follow up film to Beyond the Bourqa was intended, however filming came to an abrupt end when a suicide bomb was detonated at a U.N. compound very near to where Bahramitash was staying and herself and her crew were forced to leave Afghanistan because of the heightened level of danger.

Bahramitash is the winner of the Aileen D. Ross award (2003–04) for her focus on women and poverty in the Middle East. Her post-doctoral research was selected by the Social Sciences and Humanities Research Council (SSHRC) as one of the three most distinguished research projects in Canada. In 2006 she won a three-year research grant from the SSHRC for a project on Globalization, Islam and Women. Bahramitash has worked as a researcher and/or consultant with the Canadian International Development Agency (CIDA), the International Development Research Centre, and the United Nations Development Program ).

Her first book was Liberation from Liberalization: Gender and Globalization in Southeast Asia. This book has been translated into Persian and published by SAMT as a university textbook. Her recent books are entitled Veiled Employment: Islamism and the Political Economy of Women's Employment in Iran by Syracuse University Press (co-edited with Hadi S. Esfahani) 2011, and Gender in Contemporary Iran: Pushing the Boundaries by Routledge and which was co-edited with Eric Hooglund, 2011. She most recently served as a Director of Research at the University of Montreal

== Publications ==
This is a list of select publications by Bahramitash.

=== Books ===
- Bahramitash, Roksana (2005). Liberation from liberalization gender and globalization in Southeast Asia. London New York City: Zed Books. ISBN 9781842774397. Reprinted by Book for Change in 2008. Translated into Persian in print by SAMT (Iranian University Textbook Publishing House).
- Bahramitash, Roksana; Hooglund, Eric, eds. (2011). Gender in contemporary Iran pushing the boundaries. New York: Routledge. ISBN 9780415781015.
- Bahramitash, Roksana; Esfahani, Hadi Salehi (2011). Veiled employment: Islamism and the political economy of women's employment in Iran. Syracuse, New York: Syracuse University Press. ISBN 9780815632139.
- Bahramitash, Roksana (2013). Gender and entrepreneurship in Iran: microenterprise and the informal sector. New York City: Palgrave Macmillan. ISBN 9781137342867.
- Bahramitash, Roksana; Esfahani, Hadi Salehi (2016). Political and Socio-Economic Change in the Middle East and North Africa: Gender Perspectives and Survival Strategies. New York City: Palgrave Macmillan. ISBN 9781349569069.

=== Book chapters ===
- Bahramitash, Roksana (2004). "Globalization, Islamization, and women's employment in Indonesia". In Tétreault, Mary Ann; Denemark, Robert A. (eds.). Gods, guns, and globalization: religious radicalism and international political economy. Boulder, Colorado: Lynne Rienner Publishers. pp. 219–232. ISBN 9781588262530.

=== Journal articles ===
- Bahramitash, Roksana (March 2004). "Market fundamentalism versus religious fundamentalism: women's employment in Iran". Critique: Critical Middle Eastern Studies. 13 (1). Taylor and Francis: 33–46. doi:10.1080/1066992042000189706. S2CID 220378330.
- —— (June 2005). "The war on terror, feminist orientalism and orientalist feminism: case studies of two North American bestsellers". Critique: Critical Middle Eastern Studies. 14 (2). Taylor and Francis: 221–235. doi:10.1080/10669920500135512. S2CID 143620434.
- ——; Kazemipour, Shahla (September 2006). "Myth and realities of the impact of Islam on women: women's changing marital status in Iran". Critique: Critical Middle Eastern Studies. 15 (2). Taylor and Francis: 111–128. doi:10.1080/10669920600762066. S2CID 145233184.
- —— (Spring 2007). "Iranian women during the reform era (1994-2004): a focus on employment" (PDF). Journal of Middle East Women's Studies. 3 (2). Duke University Press: 86–109. doi:10.2979/mew.2007.3.2.86. JSTOR 10.2979/mew.2007.3.2.86. S2CID 143059589.
- —— (Summer 2007). "Family planning, Islam and women's human rights in Iran". International Studies Journal. 4 (1): 33–50. OCLC 775270728.
- —— (March 2008). "Iran: the axis of evil". International Feminist Journal of Politics. 10 (1). Taylor and Francis: 98–101. doi:10.1080/14616740701747741. S2CID 144793921.
- —— (Spring 2009). "Gender, development, interdisciplinary research and international relations" (PDF). International Studies Journal. 5 (4): 21–25.
- —— (June 2004). "Myths and realities of the impact of political Islam on women: female employment in Iran and Indonesia". Development in Practice. 14 (4). Deborah Eade (editor). Taylor and Francis: 508–520. doi:10.1080/09614520410001686106. S2CID 145504724.
