= List of works about the People's Mujahedin of Iran =

This is a bibliography and filmography of the People's Mujahedin of Iran (MEK) covering the key works published in various mediums, excluding news content and direct publications of the MEK. They are sorted in ascending order.

== Written works ==
=== Encyclopedia entries ===
- Kushner, Harvey, ed. (2003). "Mujahedin-E-Khalq Organization". Mujahedin-E-Khalq Organization. Encyclopedia of Terrorism. SAGE Publications. pp. 245–246. doi:10.4135/9781412952590.n298. ISBN 9780761924081.
- Abrahamian, Ervand (2009). "Mujāhidīn". In Esposito, John (ed.). The Oxford Encyclopedia of the Modern Islamic World. Oxford University Press. doi:10.1093/acref/9780195305135.001.0001. ISBN 978-0-19-530513-5.
- Ciment, James, ed. (2011). "Directory of Terrorist Groups and Individuals: Mojahedin-e Khalq Organization (MEK or MKO)". World Terrorism: An Encyclopedia of Political Violence from Ancient Times to the Post-9/11 Era: An Encyclopedia of Political Violence from Ancient Times to the Post-9/11 Era. World Terrorism: An Encyclopedia of Political Violence from Ancient Times to the Post-9/11 Era. Routledge. ISBN 9781317451525.
- Rezai, Hamid (2014). "Mujāhidīn-i Khalq". In Shahin, Emad (ed.). The Oxford Encyclopedia of Islam and Politics. Oxford University Press.

=== Books ===
English

- Abrahamian, Ervand (1987), Radical Islam: The Iranian Mojahedin, I.B. Tauris, Yale University Press, ISBN 9781850430773
- Singleton, Anne (2003), Saddam's Private Army: How Rajavi Changed Iran's Mojahedin from Armed Revolutionaries to an Armed Cult, Iran-Interlink UK, ISBN 9780954500900
- Banisadr, Masoud (2004), Masoud: Memoirs of an Iranian Rebel, Saqi, ISBN 9780863563744
- Mohaddessin, Mohammad (2004), Enemies of the Ayatollahs: The Iranian Opposition and Its War on Islamic Fundamentalism, translated by Farid Savadkouhi, Zed Books, ISBN 9781842775301
- Cohen, Ronen (2008), The Rise and Fall of the Mojahedin Khalq, 1987–1997: Their Survival after the Islamic Revolution and Resistance to the Islamic Republic of Iran, Sussex Academic Press, ISBN 9781845192709
- Singleton, Anne (2011), The Life of Camp Ashraf: Mojahedin-e Khalq – Victims of Many Masters, Iran-Interlink UK, ISBN 9780954500917
- Bloomfield, Lincoln P. (2013), The Mujahedin-E Khalq (MEK): Shackled by a Twisted History, University of Baltimore College of Public Affairs, ISBN 9780615783840
- Stevenson, Struan (2015), Self-Sacrifice: Life with the Iranian Mojahedin, Birlinn Ltd, ISBN 9780857908681
- Bloomfield, Lincoln P. (2019), The Ayatollahs and the MEK: Iran's Crumbling Influence Operation, Palmer Coates LLC, ISBN 9780578536095

Non-English

- Chevalerias, Alain (2004), Brûlé vif : Au nom de Marx et de Mahomet enquête sur les Moujahidine du peuple d´Iran (in French), Centre de recherche sur le Terrorisme, ISBN 9782952297806
- Gessler, Antoine (2004), L'autopsie d'une dérive : analyses et références sur l'Organisation des moudjahidin du peuple d'Iran (OMPI) (in French), Ed. à la Carte, ISBN 9782884645393
- Mojahedin-e Khalq Organization: Arising & the End, 1965–2005 (in Persian), Political Studies and Research Institute, 2005, ISBN 9645645581
- Karimi, Farah (2006), Het geheim van het vuur (in Dutch), Arena, ISBN 9069746379
- Goulet, Nathalie (2012), L'OMPI : une secte au coeur de la République (in French), ISBN 9782815906104
- Zal, Mohsen (2018), Sazman-e Mas'ud: Anthropology of Mojahedin-e Khalq Organization (After 1979 Revolution) (in Persian), Kavir, ISBN 9789642141609

=== Chapters ===
- Buchta, Wilfried (2000), "The Militant Iranian Opposition in Iran and Exile", Who Rules Iran?: The Structure of Power in the Islamic Republic, The Washington Institute for Near East Policy, The Konrad Adenauer Stiftung, ISBN 9780944029398
- Katzman, Kenneth (2001), "The People's Mojahedin Organization of Iran", in Benliot, Albert V. (ed.), Iran: Outlaw, Outcast, Or Normal Country?, Nova Publishers, ISBN 1560729546
- Clark, Mark Edmond (2016), "An Analysis of the Role of the Iranian Diaspora in the Financial Support System of the Mujahedin-e-Khalq", in Gold, David; Costigan, Sean S. (eds.), Terrornomics, Routledge, p. 65, ISBN 978-1317045908
- Banisadr, Masoud (2016), "The Metamorphosis of MEK (Mujahedin e Khalq)", in Barker, Eileen (ed.), Revisionism and Diversification in New Religious Movements, Routledge, ISBN 978-1317063612
- Harmon, Christopher; Bowdish, Randall G. (2018), "Advertising: The People's Mujahideen e Khalq", The Terrorist Argument: Modern Advocacy and Propaganda, Brookings Institution Press, ISBN 9780815732198

=== Articles ===
- Piazza, James (1994). "The Democratic Islamic Republic of Iran in Exile: The Mojahedin-e Khalq and its Struggle for Survival". Digest of Middle East Studies. 3 (4). doi:10.1111/j.1949-3606.1994.tb00535.x.
- Vakily, Abdollah (1998), "In search of "revolutionary Islam:" The case of Tāleqānī and the Mojāhedīn", The Muslim World, 88 (1): 22–46, doi:10.1111/j.1478-1913.1998.tb03644.x
- Dorraj, Manochehr (2006). "The Political Sociology of Sect and Sectarianism in Iranian Politics: 1960-1979". Journal of Third World Studies. 23 (2): 95–117. JSTOR 45194310.
- Cohen, Ronen (2008). "The Mojahedin: a Terror Organization or Liberation Fighters?". Digest of Middle East Studies. 17 (2): 17–31. doi:10.1111/j.1949-3606.2008.tb00235.x.
- Banisadr, Masoud (2009). "Terrorist Organizations Are Cults". Cultic Studies Review. 8 (2).
- Cohen, Ronen (2013). "The Triple Exclusion of the Mojahedin-e Khalq Organization - Their Activities for Human Rights in Iran as a Voice in the Wilderness". Middle Eastern Studies. 49 (6): 941–957. doi:10.1080/00263206.2013.836494. S2CID 143557545.
- Sheehan, Ivan Sascha (2013). "Challenging a Terrorist Tag in the Media: Framing the Politics of Resistance and an Iranian Opposition Group". Digest of Middle East Studies. 22 (2): 229–261. doi:10.1111/dome.12033.
- de Boer, Tom; Zieck, Marjoleine (2014). "From Internment to Resettlement of Refugees: On US Obligations towards MeK Defectors in Iraq". Melbourne Journal of International Law. 15 (1).
- Khodabandeh, Massoud (2015). "The Iranian Mojahedin-e Khalq (MEK) and Its Media Strategy: Methods of Information Manufacture". Asian Politics & Policy. 7 (1): 173–177. doi:10.1111/aspp.12164.
- Cohen, Ronen (2018). "The Mojahedin-e Khalq versus the Islamic Republic of Iran: from war to propaganda and the war on propaganda and diplomacy". Middle Eastern Studies. 54 (6): 1000–1014. doi:10.1080/00263206.2018.1478813. S2CID 149542445.
- Haibat Kannaby, Ahmad; Saadah, Kholifatus; Dharmaputra, Radityo (2018). "The Role of the Media in Enhancing Public Awareness - the Transfer of Iranian Mojahedin-e Khalq (MEK) Members from Iraq's Ashraf Camp to Albania". Proceedings of the International Post-Graduate Conference on Media and Communication. pp. 463–466. doi:10.5220/0007331404630466. ISBN 978-989-758-337-7.
- Shay, Shaul (2020). "Albania and the Iranian Terror Threat". Security Science Journal. 1 (1): 35–44. doi:10.37458/ssj.1.1.3. S2CID 225510717.

=== Reports ===
- "Mujahedin-e Khalq (MEK): Criminal Investigation" (PDF), Federal Bureau of Investigation, 29 November 2004
- "No Exit: Human Rights Abuses Inside the MKO Camps" (PDF), Human Rights Watch, May 2005
- Goulka, Jeremiah; Hansell, Lydia; Wilke, Elizabeth; Larson, Judith (2009), The Mujahedin-e Khalq in Iraq: A Policy Conundrum (PDF), RAND Corporation, ISBN 9780833047014
- "Camp Ashraf: Iraqi Obligations and State Department Accountability", United States House Committee on Foreign Affairs, 7 December 2011, ISBN 9780160905018

== Documentary films ==
- Bahari, Maziar (director) (2007). A Cult That Would Be an Army: Cult of the Chameleon. Al Jazeera.
- The Strange World of the People's Mujahedin (2012): BBC World Service documentary directed by Owen Bennett-Jones and produced by Wisebuddah company. It won New York Festivals award for Best Investigative Report in 2013.
- Ware, Michael (director) (2017). "Chasing Iranian Spies". Uncensored with Michael Ware. Season 1. Episode 3. National Geographic.

=== Series, films and documentaries by the Islamic Republic of Iran on the MEK ===
- Comrades in Arms: Ashraf Camp in Iraq Turned into a Harem for Leader. Press TV. 2014.
- The Secrets Behind Auvers-sur-Oise. Press TV. 2016.
- Handwritings (Persian: دست نوشته ها, romanized: Dast Neveshteha): The 1987 action, Drama, Thriller film was directed by Mehrzad Minui, based on scenario of Behrouz Afkhami.
- The Wolves (Persian: گرگها, romanized: Gorg-ha): four-part eight-houred documentary series initially released in 2007 and reissued in 2013 as a 90-minutes documentary, aired by the Islamic Republic of Iran Broadcasting. It includes footage from Ba'athist Iraq archives of confidential top-level meetings.
- Payeshenas, Morteza (director) (2015). An Unfinished Film for My Daughter, Somayeh. Somayeh Mohammadi said that the videos and photos used in the documentary were "given to the regime's intelligence to make a documentary against PMOI."
- The Insider (Persian: نفوذی, romanized: Nofoozi): 2008 feature film directed by Ahmad Kaveri and starring Amir Jafari as an MEK defector who returns to Iran in 2004.
- Cyanide (Persian: سیانور, romanized: Siyanor): 2016 feature film directed by Behrouz Shoaibi which portrays the organization during the 1970s. The cast includes Babak Hamidian, Behnoosh Tabatabaei, Hanieh Tavassoli, Atila Pesyani, Mehdi Hashemi and Hamed Komeili.
- Mina's Choice (Persian: امکان مینا, romanized: Emkan-e Mina): 2016 drama about a happy marriage of couple Mina and Mehran which tears apart. According to the director Kamal Tabrizi and producer Manouchehr Mohammadi, the film intends to "give warnings to families" about the MEK.
- The Midday Event (Persian: ماجرای نیمروز): 2017 political drama directed by Mohammad-Hossein Mahdavian, it features the MEK during the 1980s and was named the best film in the 35th Fajr International Film Festival.
- The Gift of Darkness (Persian: ارمغان تاریکی, romanized: Armaghan-e Tariki): 2011 drama series directed by Jalil Saman features the MEK during the 1980s.
- Parvaneh (Persian: پروانه): 2013 drama series directed by Jalil Saman about the MEK during the 1970s.
- Nafas (Persian: نفس): 2017 drama series directed by Jalil Saman features 1970s.
- Trace of blood, second season of "The Midday Event", political drama directed by Mohammad-Hossein Mahdavian, it features the MEK during Operation Mersad and was awarded in the 37th Fajr International Film Festival.
