= Ervand Abrahamian =

Iranian-American historian (born 1940)

- Abrahamian in 2026
- Born: Ervand Vahan Abrahamian; 1940 (age 85–86); Tehran, Iran
- Citizenship: United States
- Spouse(s): Helen Harbison (m. 1967; died 1981) Mary Nolan (m. 1986)
- Children: 2

Academic background
- Education: St John's College, Oxford (BA, MA); Columbia University (MA, PhD)
- Thesis: Social Bases of Iranian Politics: The Tudeh Party, 1941–53 (1969)
- Academic advisor: Keith Thomas
- Influences: Christopher Hill, E. P. Thompson

Academic work
- Discipline: Iranian studies, political history, social history
- School or tradition: Marxist historiography, Neo-Marxism
- Institutions: Baruch College; Graduate Center, CUNY; Princeton University; New York University; Oxford University
- Doctoral students: Touraj Atabaki
- Main interests: Qajar dynasty, 1953 coup d'état, 1979 Revolution, Islamic Republic
- Notable works: A History of Modern Iran (2008); Khomeinism (1993); Iran Between Two Revolutions (1982)

Ervand Abrahamian (Persian: یرواند آبراهامیان; Armenian: Երուանդ Աբրահամեան; born 1940) is an Iranian-American historian of the Middle East. He is a Distinguished Professor of History at Baruch College and at the Graduate Center of the City University of New York. His work deals with political repression in the Islamic Republic of Iran as well as Iranian politics.

== Early life ==
Ervand Vahan Abrahamian was born in 1940 in Tehran to Armenian parents. He attended three grades at the Mehr School in Tehran and was further educated in England at the prestigious Rugby School from 1954 to 1959. He then received his B.A. in modern history from St John's College, Oxford, in 1963. During this period, he studied with Keith Thomas and developed a focus on European history.

After completing his undergraduate studies, Abrahamian moved to New York City, where he studied at Columbia University and received an M.A. in 1966. He then received a second M.A. from Oxford in 1968 and earned a Ph.D. in political science from Columbia in 1969. His dissertation was titled, "Social Bases of Iranian Politics: The Tudeh Party, 1941-53."

Abrahamian was an activist and a member of the Confederation of Iranian Students — National Union (CISNU) that opposed the rule of Shah Mohammad Reza Pahlavi in the 1960s and 1970s. In 1976, he was one of the vice chairpersons of the Committee for Artistic and Intellectual Freedom in Iran (CAIFI), a minor front of the Socialist Workers Party (SWP).

== Career ==
Abrahamian has formerly taught at Princeton University, New York University, Columbia University, and Oxford University. He has spent most of his career at the City University of New York (CUNY). He is currently Distinguished Professor of History at Baruch College and the CUNY Graduate Center. His research interests include the history and politics of the Middle East, primarily in Iran.

Abrahamian regularly comments on Iranian politics and the foreign relations of Iran (including Iran–United States relations). He is considered an authority on Iranian opposition movements, including the People's Mujahedin of Iran (MEK). He has appeared as a guest on BBC Persian, Charlie Rose, Worldfocus, Amanpour & Company, Democracy Now!, Lou Dobbs Tonight, and other series and channels.

== Views ==
Abrahamian has stated that his "understanding of Iran [was] ... most shaped [by] the oil crisis of 1951-53 culminating in the coup." In his 1989 book Radical Islam, Abrahamian described himself as "a sceptic by intellectual training; a democratic socialist by political preference; and, as far as religious conviction is concerned, an agnostic on most days — on other days, an atheist." In 1983, he told The New York Times that he has an "independent Marxist point of view." Christoph Marcinkowski wrote that Abrahamian's publications "feature more or less the left-wing political perspective of their author – especially in terms of socio-political and socio-economic analysis." Abrahamian has been influenced by Marxist historians Christopher Hill, Eric Hobsbawm, E. P. Thompson, and others. He has called Thompson a "towering figure for a number of reasons — not just for historians of Iran, but also for Marxist historians throughout the world." He is generally sympathetic towards the Tudeh Party. Werner has described Abrahamian as a "vivid chronicler of the history of the Iranian Left, defying any attempt to view twentieth-century Iran exclusively through an Islamicate lens."

In 1986, Abrahamian objected that the obituary of Loy W. Henderson in The New York Times did not mention his role in the 1953 Iranian coup d'état, which he described as "probably his most important contribution." He wrote to the Times: "Few ambassadors have so decisively changed the course of a country's history. What is more, he set a State Department precedent by permitting secret agents to use the embassy compound to carry out the coup. Your oversight would have amused George Orwell; it certainly would not have surprised him."

== Publications ==
- Abrahamian, Ervand (1982). Iran Between Two Revolutions. Limited Paperback Editions, Princeton Studies on the Near East. Princeton University Press. ISBN 9780691101347.
- Abrahamian, Ervand (1989). Radical Islam: The Iranian Mojahedin. I.B. Tauris. ISBN 9781850430773.
- Abrahamian, Ervand (1989). The Iranian Revolution. Yale University Press.
- Abrahamian, Ervand (1993). Khomeinism: Essays on the Islamic Republic. University of California Press. ISBN 9780520085039.
- Abrahamian, Ervand (1999). Tortured Confessions: Prisons and Public Recantations in Modern Iran. University of California Press. ISBN 9780520922907.
- Cumings, Bruce; Abrahamian, Ervand; Ma'Oz, Moshe (2004). Inventing the Axis of Evil: The Truth about North Korea, Iran, and Syria. New York, NY: The New Press. ISBN 9781595580382.
- Barsamian, David; Chomsky, Noam; Abrahamian, Ervand; Mozaffari, Nahid (2007). Targeting Iran. Open Media Series, Politics, Culture and Society Series. San Francisco, California: City Lights Books. ISBN 9780872864580.
- Abrahamian, Ervand (2008). A History of Modern Iran. Cambridge University Press. ISBN 978-0521821391.
- Abrahamian, Ervand (2013). The Coup: 1953, the CIA, and the Roots of Modern U.S.-Iranian Relations. New York, New York: The New Press. ISBN 9781595588265.
- Abrahamian, Ervand (2022). Oil Crisis in Iran: From Nationalism to Coup d' Etat. New York, New York: Cambridge University Press. ISBN 9781108837491.

=== Iran Between Two Revolutions ===
Abrahamian's best known and most cited book is Iran Between Two Revolutions (1982), published by Princeton University Press. It is an account of the history of Iran from the Constitutional Revolution of 1905–06 to the Islamic Revolution of 1978–79.

Initial reviews were largely positive. Criticisms included disproportional focus on the Communist movement and the Tudeh Party, and reliance on British archives. Sepehr Zabih wrote that it is constrained by the ideological bias of neo-Marxist approach of E. P. Thompson. M. E. Yapp wrote: "with all its imperfections, Abrahamian's book is the most interesting and exciting book on the recent history of Iran which has appeared for many years." Zabih was more reserved: "this work is a significant addition to the literature on some aspects of the Iranian communist movement. The author is well versed in the selected periods of recent Iranian history. No one with sustained interest in Iranian politics, especially those of the left, could afford to ignore this volume." Gene R. Garthwaite wrote that the book made three significant contributions: "its class analysis will force all of us-Marxist and non-Marxist alike-to re-examine our ideas about Iran's twentieth-century history and will provide the basis for discussion for some time to come; it gives the best account of the development of the Tudeh party and its social, intellectual, and political bases; and it presents the most detailed account of the Pahlavi period (ca. 1921-78) and its political history." Mazzaoui described it as "the best and most balanced account of the social and political developments in contemporary Persian history."

=== Radical Islam: The Iranian Mojahedin ===
In Radical Islam: The Iranian Mojahedin (1989) Abrahamian investigated the origins and history of the People's Mujahedin of Iran (MEK). The book sets out to answer several questions about the group, particularly concerning "the links between its ideology and its social bases." It was well received by reviewers. Eric Hooglund called it a "very important book" that provides "detailed, objective, and erudite analysis" of the MEK. He also argued that its most important contribution is the exposition of the party's ideology. Mazzaoui wrote: "There is very little to criticize in this masterfully written piece of current research. Dr. Abrahamian writes sympathetically and at times dramatically-but always as an accomplished scholar."

=== Khomeinism ===
Abrahamian's 1993 book on Iran's first Supreme Leader, Ruhollah Khomeini and his ideology, is entitled Khomeinism. The book consisted of five essays. He argued that Khomeinism is "best understood as a populist movement, not a religious resurgence." He described Khomeini's movement as a form of Third World populism. Fred Halliday called it a "superb study of political ideology in general and of the ideological evolution of the founder of the Islamic Republic in particular." Baktiari had a mixed review. He noted that it is well written, but "far from well documented." However, he called it a "stimulating book that deserves wide readership." Fakhreddin Azimi described it as a "lucid and provocative book."

=== Tortured Confessions ===
Abrahamian's 1999 book Tortured Confessions: Prisons and Public Recantations in Modern Iran covers political repressions against opposition movements both before and after the Islamic Revolution, ending with the mass executions of 1988. It reviews interrogation tactics and prison facilities used in 20th century Iran. It was well received by critics. Mahdi praised it as a significant and timely book.

=== A History of Modern Iran ===
A History of Modern Iran, published in 2008, was widely praised. The book narrates state building of modern Iran. John Limbert called it a "scholarly, readable, and engaging study of the last century of Iranian history." Philip S. Khoury described it as "the most intelligent and perceptive history of modern Iran available in the English language."

=== The Coup ===
Abrahamian's 2013 book The Coup: 1953, the CIA, and the Roots of Modern U.S.-Iranian Relations was met with mixed to favorable reviews. David S. Painter opined that "Despite some problems, The Coup is a valuable corrective to previous work and an important contribution to Iranian history." Mark Gasiorowski was more critical. He argued that the book does not provide any "major new revelations or insights and is misleading in several ways."

== Recognition ==
Abrahamian has been described as a prominent historian on modern Iran. He has also been described as the "preeminent historian of modern Iran," and also as "one of the preeminent Iranian historians of his generation." Mansour Farhang noted that his books are "indispensable source of information, insight and analysis for scholars and general readers as well." In 1995 Fred Halliday opined in Iranian Studies that Ervand Abrahamian "has already established himself as one of the finest writers on twentieth-century Iran." Eric Hooglund wrote in 2000 that Abrahamian's books have "established his reputation as the leading scholar of Iran's twentieth-century social history." Reza Afshari wrote in 2002 that since the publication of the seminal Iran Between Two Revolutions (1982), Abrahamian has "become one of the most influential historians of modern Iran."

Abrahamian was elected a fellow of the American Academy of Arts and Sciences in 2010. He is also a member of the Middle East Studies Association of North America and the American Historical Association.

== Personal life ==
Abrahamian is a naturalized American citizen. He is known by friends as "Jed". In 1967, Abrahamian married Helen Mary Harbison, a cellist in the Princeton Chamber Orchestra and the Da Capo Chamber Players who was the sister of composer John Harbison and the daughter of historian E. Harris Harbison. Harbison died on January 27, 1981, of cancer.

As of 2019, Abrahamian is married to Mary Nolan, a professor emerita of history at New York University (NYU). He has two children: Emma and Rafi.

== Bibliography ==
Academic articles

- "The Crowd in Iranian Politics 1905–1953." Past & Present, no. 41 (1968): pages 184–210.
- "The Crowd in the Persian Revolution." Iranian Studies 2, no. 4 (1969): pages 128–50.
- "Communism and Communalism in Iran: The Tudah and the Firqah-I Dimukrat." International Journal of Middle East Studies 1, no. 4 (1970): pages 291–316.
- "Kasravi: The Integrative Nationalist of Iran." Middle Eastern Studies 9, no. 3 (1973): pages 271–95.
- "Oriental Despotism: The Case of Qajar Iran." International Journal of Middle East Studies 5, no. 1 (1974): pages 3–31.
- "European Feudalism and Middle Eastern Despotisms." Science & Society 39, no. 2 (1975): pages 129–56.
- "The Political Crisis Intensifies." MERIP Reports, no. 71 (1978): 3–6.
- "Factionalism in Iran: Political Groups in the 14th Parliament (1944-46)." Middle Eastern Studies 14, no. 1 (1978): pages 22–55.
- "The Nonrevolutionary Peasantry of Modern Iran." Iranian Studies 11, no. 1/4 (1978): pages 259–304.
- "The Causes of the Constitutional Revolution in Iran." International Journal of Middle East Studies 10, no. 3 (1979): pages 381–414.
- "Iran in Revolution: The Opposition Forces." MERIP Reports, no. 75/76 (1979): pages 3–8.
- "Structural Causes of the Iranian Revolution." MERIP Reports, no. 87 (1980): pages 21–26
- "The Guerrilla Movement in Iran, 1963–1977." MERIP Reports, no. 86 (1980): pages 3–15.
- "'Ali Shari'ati: Ideologue of the Iranian Revolution." MERIP Reports, no. 102 (1982): pages 24–28.
- "Ahmad Ashraf: Bazaar and Mosque in Iran's Revolution." MERIP Reports, no. 113 (1983): pages 16–18.
- "Khomeini: fundamentalist or populist? New Left Review, 1991
- "The 1953 Coup in Iran." Science & Society 65, no. 2 (2001): pages 182-215.
- "The US Media, Huntington and September 11." Third World Quarterly 24, no. 3 (2003): pages 529-44.
- "Why the Islamic Republic Has Survived." Middle East Report, no. 250 (2009): pages 10-16. doi:10.2307/27735276.
- "Voice of the Discontented." History Workshop Journal, no. 76 (2013): pages 256-58.
