= Post-Islamism =

Neologism in political science

Post-Islamism is a neologism in political science, the definition and applicability of which is disputed. Asef Bayat and Olivier Roy are among the main architects of the idea.

The term has been used by Bayat to refer to "a tendency" towards resecularizing of Islam after the "exhaustion" of political Islam; by Olivier Carré to refer to an era of Islamic history (following the decline of the Abbasids but before modernity) where the political-military and religious realms were separated; by Olivier Roy to a recognition that after repeated efforts Islamists had failed to establish a "concrete and viable blueprint for society"; and by Mustafa Akyol to refer to a reactionary opposition to Islamism in countries like Turkey, Iran, and Sudan.

== Terminology and definition ==
The term was coined by Iranian political sociologist Asef Bayat, then associate professor of sociology at The American University in Cairo in a 1996 essay published in the journal Middle East Critique. Bayat used it to refer "to the pragmatist orientation of Iran’s leadership after the death of Khomeini".

Bayat describes it as "a condition where, following a phase of experimentation, the appeal, energy, symbols and sources of legitimacy of Islamism" becomes "exhausted, even among its once-ardent supporters", and a "fusion between Islam (as a personalized faith) and individual freedom and choice; ... with the values of democracy and aspects of modernity" emerges in its stead. As such, "post-Islamism is not anti-Islamic, but rather reflects a tendency to resecularize religion." It originally pertained only to Iran. In this context, the prefix post- does not have historic connotation, but refers to the critical departure from Islamist discourse. A decade later in 2007 Bayat described post-Islamism as both a "condition" and a "project".

French politician Olivier Carré used the term in 1991 from a different perspective, to describe the period between the 10th and the 19th centuries, when both Shiite and Sunni Islam "separated the political-military from the religious realm, both theoretically and in practice".

Olivier Roy argued in Globalized Islam: The Search for a New Ummah in 2004 that "Islamists around the world" had been unable "to translate their ideology into a concrete and viable blueprint for society", leading "Muslim discourse" to enter "a new phase of post-Islamism".

Peter Mandaville describes a evolution away from the "political Islam of the sort represented by the Muslim Brotherhood and the broader Ikhwani tradition" which failed to gain mass public support and "found it progressively more difficult to offer up distinctively 'Islamic' solutions to basic problems of governance and economy", and towards "a parallel retreat of religiosity into the private domain" and "the rise of Islamic hip hop, urban dress, and other popular culture forms as new spaces of resistance and activist expression", "working through platforms and network hubs rather than through formal, hierarchical social and political organizations".

Mustafa Akyol (of the libertarian think tank Cato Institute) writing in 2020, postulates not just a "tendency to resecularize" or a moderation/mellowing/tiring of Islamism, but a strong reaction by many Muslims against political Islam, including a weakening of religious faith — the very thing Islamism was intended to strengthen. The backlash has arisen especially in places where Islamists have been in power (Turkey, Iran, Sudan), and extends to a decline in religiosity among young Muslims.

According to Salwa Ismail, the terms "Postmodern Islamism" and "New Age Islamism" are used interchangeably.

== Cases ==
In Iran, the Reformist movement and the group known as the Melli-Mazhabi (who are ideologically close to the Freedom Movement) have been described as post-Islamist.

The advent of moderate parties Al-Wasat Party in Egypt, as well as Justice and Development Party in Morocco appeared to resemble emergence of post-Islamism, although scholars disputed this. A similar characterization applies to the Malaysian Islamic Party (PAS).

A 2008 Lowy Institute for International Policy paper suggests that Prosperous Justice Party of Indonesia and Justice and Development Party (AKP) of Turkey are post-Islamist. According to Ahmet T. Kuru and Alfred Stepan (2012), many analysts consider Turkish AKP an example of post-Islamism, similar to Christian democratic parties, but Islamic. However, some scholars such as Bassam Tibi dispute this. İhsan Yılmaz argues that the party's ideology after 2011 is different from that of between 2001 and 2011. Post-Islamism has also been used to describe the "ideological evolution" within the Ennahda of Tunisia.

Writing in 2020, Mustafa Akyol suggests a backlash against Islamism among Muslim youth has come from all the "terrible things" that have happened in the Arab world recently "in the name of Islam" – such as the "sectarian civil wars in Syria, Iraq and Yemen".

== Criticism ==
Scholars such as Milad Dokhanchi have questioned whether post-Islamism represents a clear rupture from Islamism or simply a reconfiguration of it. Critics argue that the concept rests on an overly narrow and monolithic definition of Islamism, often equating it with state-centered projects such as the Iranian doctrine of velayat-e faqih, while overlooking the diversity of Islamist movements, including those that opposed clerical state power. Some contend that what Bayat describes as "post-Islamist" trends emerged less as a conscious intellectual project and more as a structural adaptation to the constraints of the modern state, in which political expediency and governance needs reshaped Islamist practices from within. Others note that labeling reformist or liberal Islamic discourses as "post-Islamist" risks collapsing continuities with earlier Islamist reform traditions, thereby overstating the novelty of the shift. Finally, critics caution that equating post-Islamism with liberal or democratic orientations may marginalize non-liberal forms of religious politics that also contest authoritarianism without fitting the post-Islamist label.

== See also ==
- Islamic democracy
- Islamism
- Liberalism and progressivism in the Muslim world
- Political aspects of Islam
- Political Islam
- Postchristianity
- Post-Zionism
