= Center for Middle Eastern Studies, Lund University =

Coordinates: 55°42′24.00″N 13°12′06.0″E

Center for Middle Eastern Studies at Lund University
- Centrum för Mellanösternstudier vid Lunds Universitet
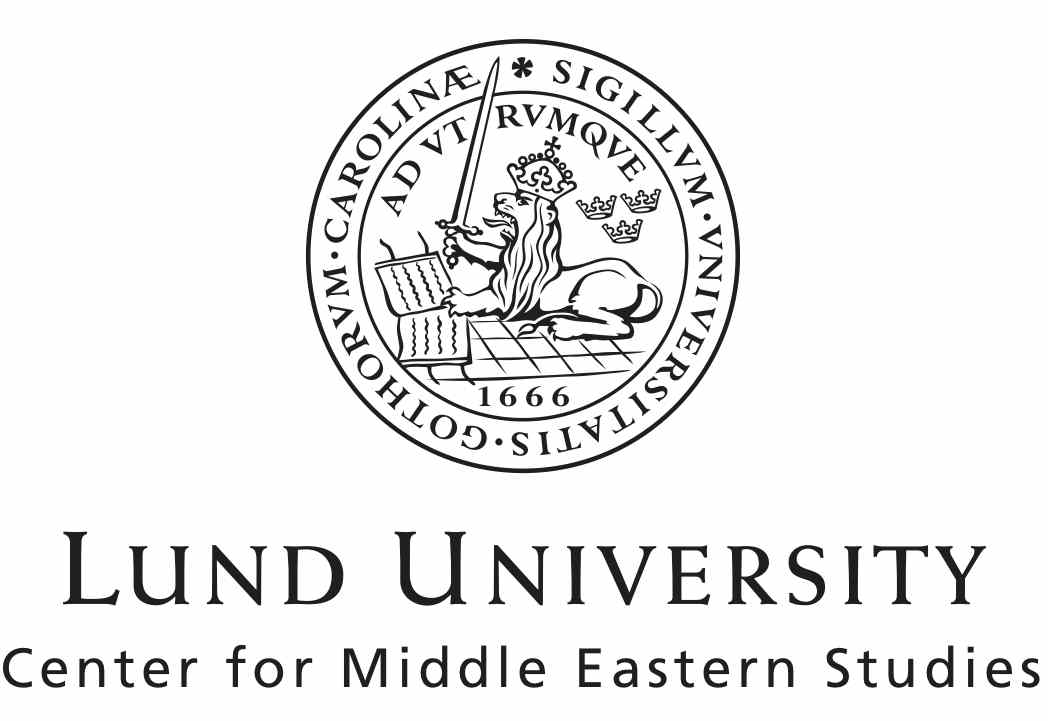
- Type: Public
- Established: 2007
- Affiliations: Gulf Research Center; Zayed University; Yale University; Centre for Syrian Studies at University of St Andrews
- Endowment: 54+ million SEK (2009)
- Director: Leif Stenberg
- Administrative staff: ca. 20
- Students: 32
- Location: (Sweden) Lund, Scania, Sweden
- Website: http://www.cmes.lu.se

The Center for Middle Eastern Studies (CMES) is part of the Faculty of Social Sciences at Lund University, based in Lund, Sweden. It was founded in 2007 to further the understanding of the Middle East, and provide the business sector, state institutions and NGOs with "effective tools for communication". The backbone of the center is the strategic research area known as the MECW, or The Middle East in the Contemporary World, which was funded by the Swedish Research Council. The MA program began in 2010. It is a two-year, four-semester, program that offers a wide range of specialization within Middle Eastern Studies.

== History ==
The Center for Middle Eastern studies (CMES) was founded in 2007 on behalf of a new effort to conduct and coordinate research on the Middle East within Lund University. Since Lund University's foundation in 1666 Islamology and semitic languages (linguarum orientalium) have been taught, but no coordinated effort to focus research existed. In 2007 the center was inaugurated by Jordanian Price Hassan bin Talal and has since hosted internationally renowned scholars like Robert Fisk, Darius Rejali, Aaron David Miller, and Naomi Sakr.

== Middle East Critique ==
The Center for Middle Eastern studies bought Middle East Critique in 2010. Former Bates professor Eric Hooglund is the editor-in-chief and founder of the journal. The journal was first published in 1992. Students in the MA program are offered internships within the journal to help them increase their knowledge and experience of academic research.

== Structure ==
CMES functions both as an international hub for multidisciplinary research and an academic department, holding courses, open seminars and movie screenings that are attended by experts in their fields. The four core structures of CMES are: Research, Academics, Publishing, and Outreach.

== MA Program ==
The MA program ran its first cycle during the fall of 2010. It is a two-year (four-semester), program that offers a wide range of specialization within Middle Eastern Studies. The first semester is composed of compulsory courses in basic theory and multidisciplinary studies in relation to the Middle East. The second semester covers a wide range of elective courses (such as political structures, media, sociology, hydro-politics, and Islam) offering the students the possibility to focus their studies according to their interests. The third semester is an internship semester where the students are given the possibility to study at a different university like the American University in Beirut or intern somewhere in the Middle East. The fourth semester is composed of courses and work related to the MA thesis.

During the four semesters, students are offered Arabic classes in preparation for the third semester. Turkish and Persian language classes are also given. In addition to the language classes, several of the research projects (as well as the center itself) offer various types of internships, during the academic year of 2010-2011 about 10 internships were filled by the students of the MA program.

Students are also offered a subsidized membership in The Association of Foreign Affairs - UPF to help them engage in the student life of Lund.

== Staff ==
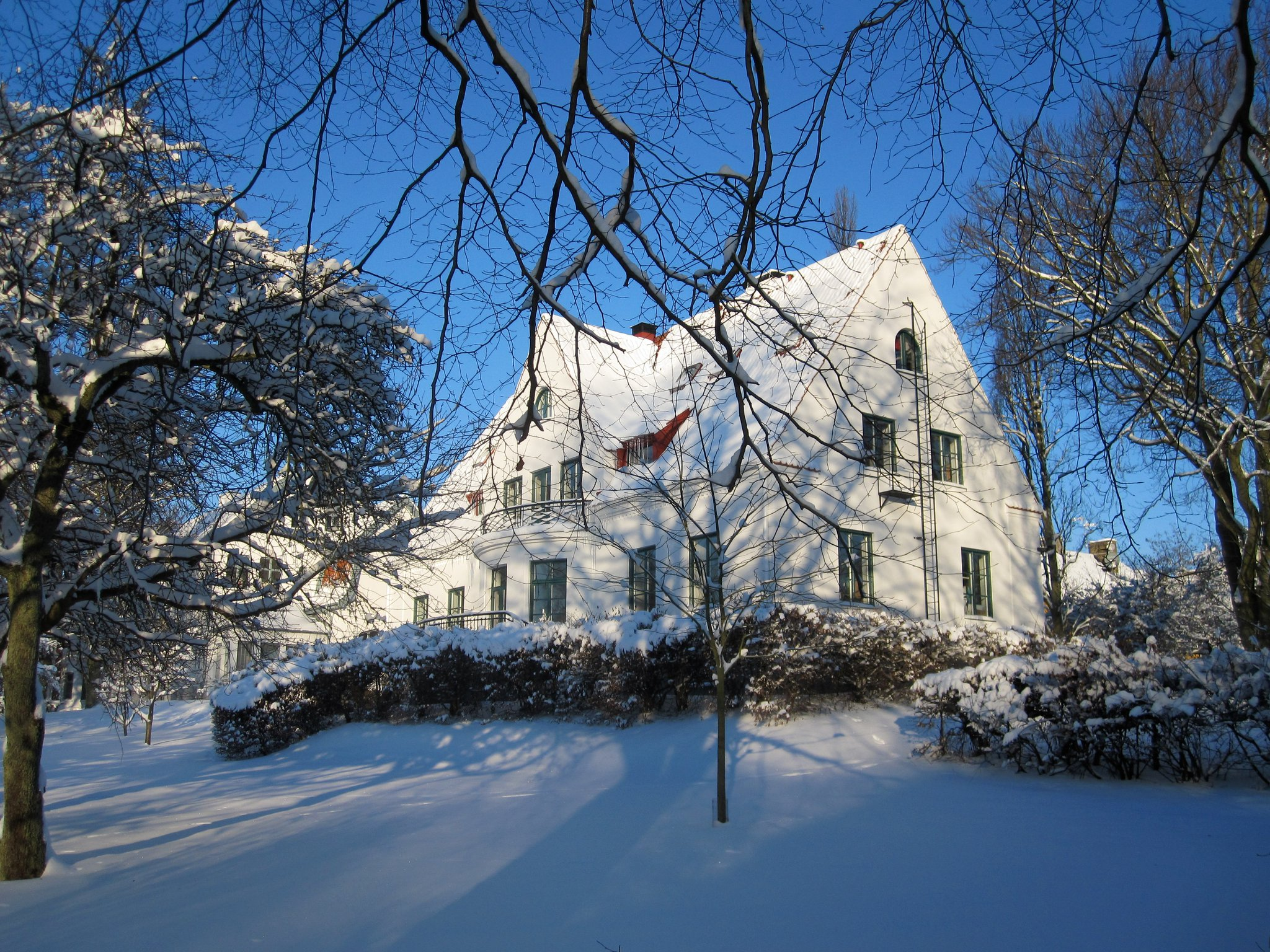
House of CMES located in Professorsstaden in Lund

- Director: Leif Stenberg
- MA Program Director Torsten Jansson

Visiting Researchers:

- Mark LeVine
- Abdulhadi Khalaf
- Eric Hooglund
- Lory Dance
- Mathias Mossberg
- Ingmar Karlsson
- Mona Abaza

== Research directions and projects ==
CMES has four general research directions, which are funded by the Swedish Research Council under the 'umbrella' project "The Middle East in the Contemporary World". A number of projects exist within the four major research domains.

=== Contemporary Interpretations of Islam and Muslim Culture ===
- Sufism in contemporary Syria headed by Leif Stenberg
- Art and consumer culture in Egypt led by Mona Abaza
- Discourses of resistance through political development in Iran headed by Eric Hooglund.

=== Hydro politics, Security and International Law ===
This project focuses on water management that aides in the prevention of conflicts that may arise from water-resources.

- Conflict and Cooperation over the Jordan river explores the relationships between local and Virtual Water ways to conserve water in the Jordan River. The project is headed by Dr. Karin Aggestam
- Promote integrated water resources management (IWRM). This projects aims to address trade-offs between national and international water management options.

=== Migration and Mobility ===
Covers three research projects (that were initiated in 2011), the projects are headed by Abdulhadi Khalaf and Petter Pilesjö while two of the projects concern the Gulf Cooperation Council area while the third covers the Iraqi part of Kurdistan:

- "The Plight of Foreign Workers" tracks the conditions and possibilities for foreign workers to organize themselves.
- "Migrant workers and the judicial ambiguities in the GCC " explores through official documents complaints submitted to the GCC courts regarding foreign workers and how the judiciary treats these cases.
- "Migration patterns in Iraqi Kurdistan and their relations to environmental factors" aims to research how the environment affects migration through GIS, Remote sensing and fieldwork

=== Other projects ===
Within the center other research projects also exist:

- "The Parallel States Project" explores an alternative solution to the Israeli–Palestinian conflict. A conference was also organized during October 2010 in Lund.
- "Women for Sustainable Growth" aims to connect female business leaders between the Gulf Cooperation Council and Scandinavia and function as a research hub, promoting sustainable growth.
- "Islam Consumer Culture and Music in Egypt and Saudi Arabia" studies the debate surrounding music censorship within Rock and Hip-Hop genres and resistance through these genres in KSA and Egypt
- "Religion, Identity and Turkey's Integration with the EU", a research project headed by Ambassador Ingmar Karlsson that studies the formation of Turkish identity and its effect on the EU

== Gallery ==
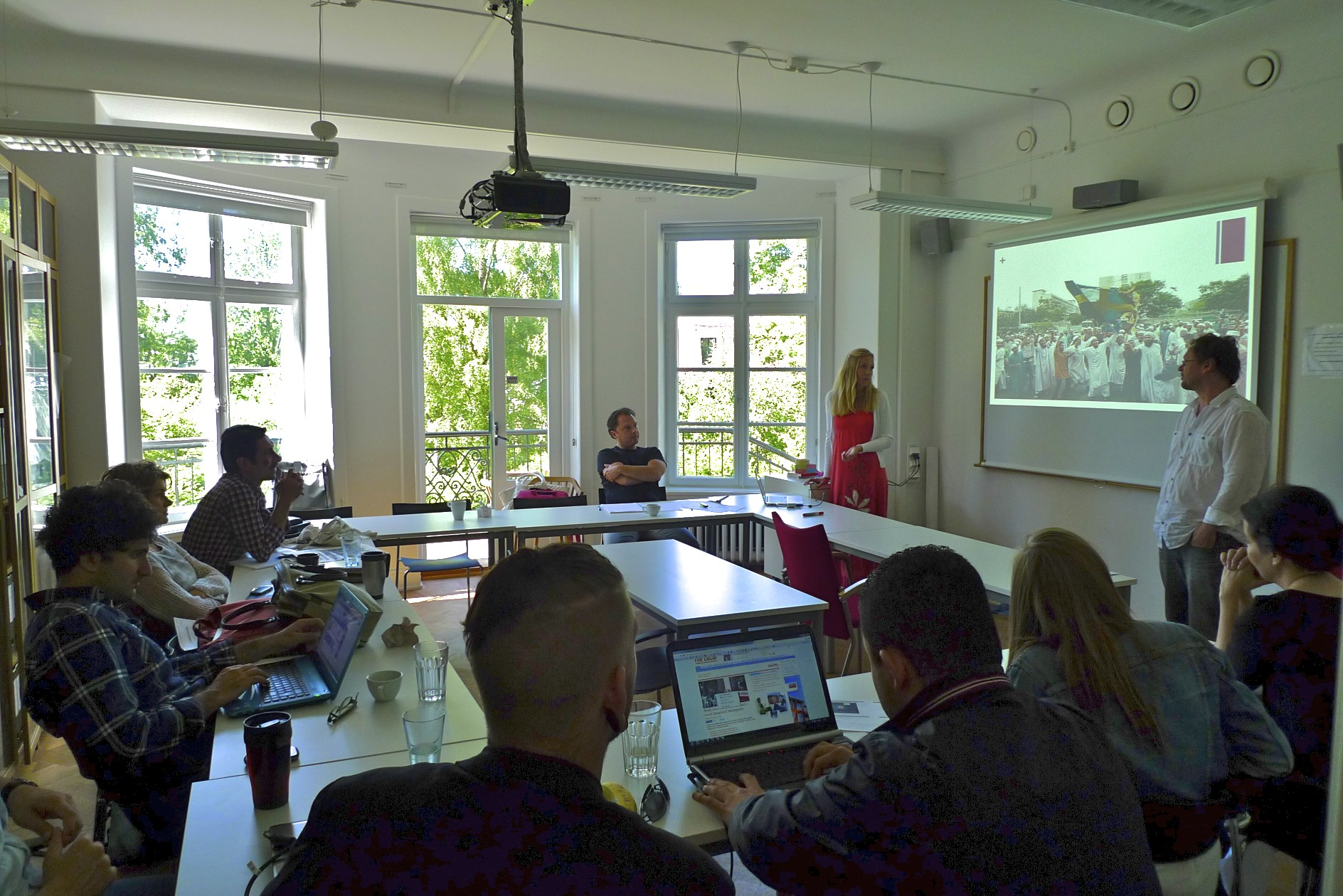
CMES Classroom in June 2011.

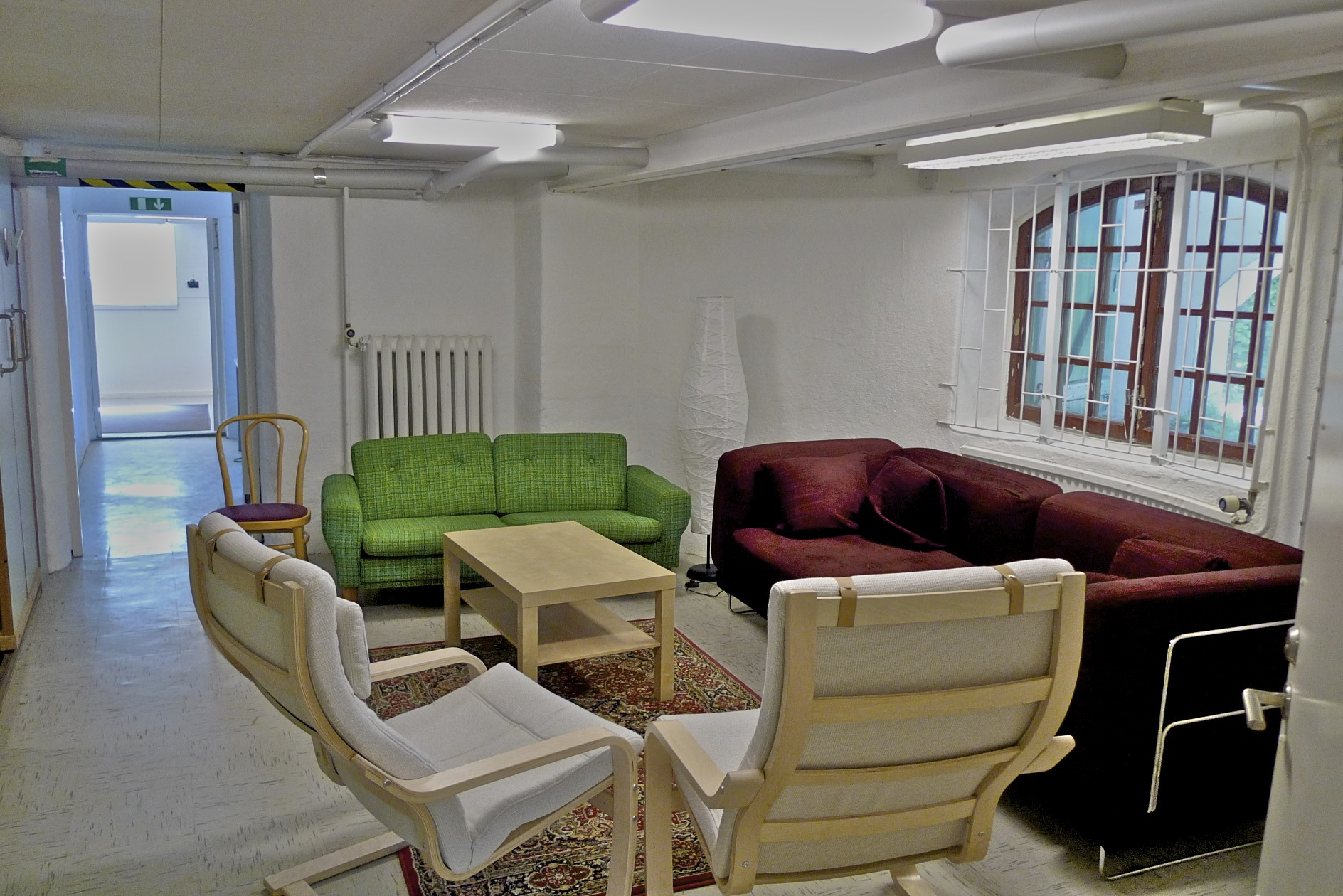
CMES Student Quarters

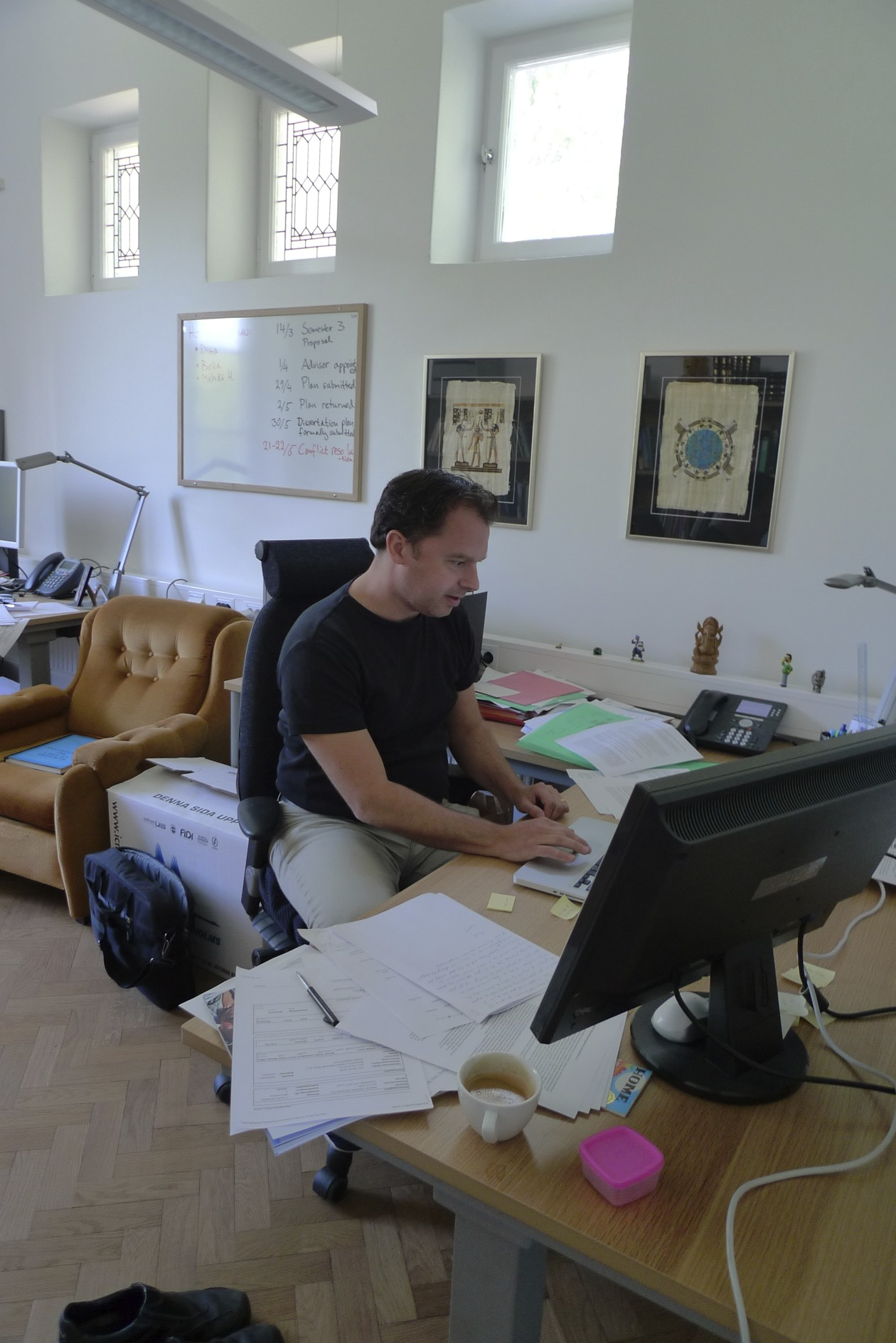
Torsten Jansson, MA Program director working in his office in June, 2011.
