= Mehdi Zakerian =

Academic background
- Education: Islamic Azad University (Ph.D. in international relations)

Mehdi Zakerian is an Iranian scholar. He is a visiting professor at the University of Pennsylvania Law School, the University of Pennsylvania, President of Iranian International Studies Association, editor-in-chief of International Studies Journal (ISJ).

== Biography ==
A scholar of international law and international human rights, Zakerian holds a Ph.D. in international relations from Islamic Azad University where he has been an assistant professor since 1999. With over 16 years of experience teaching international and Islamic human rights, he has held lectureships at prominent Iranian universities and was appointed Chair of the International Studies Association of Iran. As co-founder and Editor-in-Chief (2004-date) of the International Studies Journal, widely considered the most significant journal of international law and international politics in Iran, Zakerian promotes one of the few forums of academic dialogue in Iran to regularly publish and engage with colleagues from the West. He has collaborated with local and international universities and NGOs to organize several conferences at which he has presented papers on international relations and human rights in the Middle East.

He participated in the negotiations on human rights between Iran and the European Union as a member of the Iranian negotiating team.

== Arrest ==
Zakerian was arrested in September 2008 before a trip to the United States. Amnesty International condemned his detention as being politically motivated and urged Iranian authorities to release him. In 2008, he was prevented by Iranian authorities to leave the country to attend a conference on Palestine held in Florence in Italy. According to his lawyer, he was the organizer of the event.

== Publications ==
Zakerian has penned over 50 publications, including books, translations, book reviews and over 100 published articles, many focused on the implementation of international human rights standards in the context of an Islamic state. On this subject, Dr. William Burke-White, assistant professor of law at the University of Pennsylvania Law School writes, "this is perhaps the most important topic for international human rights scholarship in the modern context and [this scholar's] work is among the best there is.".
