= Ronen A. Cohen =

Israeli scholar of Middle Eastern studies

Ronen Cohen
- רונן א. כהן
- Born: 1976 (age 49–50)

Academic background
- Education: Bar-Ilan University
- Thesis: The Development of the Mojahedin-e Khalq Organization and Its Struggle Against the Islamic Republic of Iran, 1997–1987 (2004)

Academic work
- Institutions: Ariel University
- Main interests: Iranian studies
- Website: https://www.ariel.ac.il/wp/mecarc/ronen-a-cohen/

Ronen A. Cohen (Hebrew: רונן א. כהן) is an Israeli scholar of Middle Eastern studies. He is an associate professor at Ariel University, and heads both its Middle Eastern & Central Asian Studies (MECAS) center and Department of Middle Eastern and Political Science Studies.

Cohen's main field of research is contemporary history and politics of Iran and he has written numerous works on the subject including monographs on Iranian organizations the Hojjatieh, the Forqan and the Mojahedin-e Khalq.

== Views ==
Cohen maintains that Ruhollah Khomeini was immensely influenced by Musa al-Sadr, deriving "most of his methods and vision" from his pupil. He credits Iranian Revolution to Sadr, not Khomeini, stating "Khomeini conducted the music, but the music was composed by al-Sadr."

In a June 2013 interview with The Jerusalem Post, Cohen categorically dismissed that the next Iranian president, to-be-elected in 2013 presidential election, may follow a nuclear policy different from his predecessor and said "the president is a clerk, a pawn of the supreme leader".

Writing an opinion piece for Israel Hayom in 2018, Cohen remarked that regime change is inevitable in Iran: "it is just a matter of time before the revolution implodes and blows up in everyone's face".

== Published works ==
Books as author

- The Rise and Fall of the Mojahedin Khalq, 1987–1997: Their Survival after the Islamic Revolution and Resistance to the Islamic Republic of Iran. Sussex Academic Press. 2009.
- The Hojjatiyeh Society in Iran: Ideology and Practice from the 1950s to the Present. Palgrave Macmillan US. 2013.
- Revolution Under Attack: The Forqan Group of Iran. Palgrave Macmillan US. 2015.
- Upheavals in the Middle East: The Theory and Practice of a Revolution. Lexington Books. 2016.
- The Mostadha'fin's Confusing Journey from Shariati's Revolutionary Utopianism to Khomeini's Dystopian Reality, 1976–1982. Peter Lang. 2019.

Book chapters

- "Self-Criticism and Confronting Anti-Semitism: The Moderate Voices of Recognition in the Islamic World". Post-Holocaust Studies in a Modern Context. IGI Global. 2019.

Books as editor

- Identities in Crisis in Iran: Politics, Culture and Religion. Lexington Books. 2015.

Selected papers

- Cohen, Ronen A.; Lewin, Eyal (2019). "The Social Component of Resilience in the Islamic Republic of Iran: Utilizing Wartime Strategies to Solve Current Problems". Armed Forces & Society. 46 (4): 595–617. doi:10.1177/0095327X19830750. S2CID 150707258.
- Cohen, Ronen A. (2018). "Iran's Shortsighted Policies in Iraq: Between Inflaming and Containing of Radical Sunni Islam: 2003–2015". Digest of Middle East Studies. 27 (1): 34–52. doi:10.1111/dome.12122.
- Cohen, Ronen A. (2018). "The Mojahedin-e Khalq versus the Islamic Republic of Iran: from war to propaganda and the war on propaganda and diplomacy". Middle Eastern Studies. 54 (6): 1000–1014. doi:10.1080/00263206.2018.1478813. S2CID 149542445.
- Cohen, Ronen A. (2014). "The "Babak Khorramdin Organisation": A Mysterious Opposition Group in the Islamic Republic of Iran". Iran and the Caucasus. 18 (2): 167–180. doi:10.1163/1573384X-20140207.
- Cohen, Ronen A. (2013). "The Triple Exclusion of the Mojahedin-e Khalq Organization - Their Activities for Human Rights in Iran as a Voice in the Wilderness". Middle Eastern Studies. 49 (6): 941–957. doi:10.1080/00263206.2013.836494. S2CID 143557545.
- Cohen, Ronen A. (2008). "The Mojahedin: a Terror Organization or Liberation Fighters?". Digest of Middle East Studies. 17 (2): 17–31. doi:10.1111/j.1949-3606.2008.tb00235.x.
