= Asef Bayat =

Iranian-American scholar

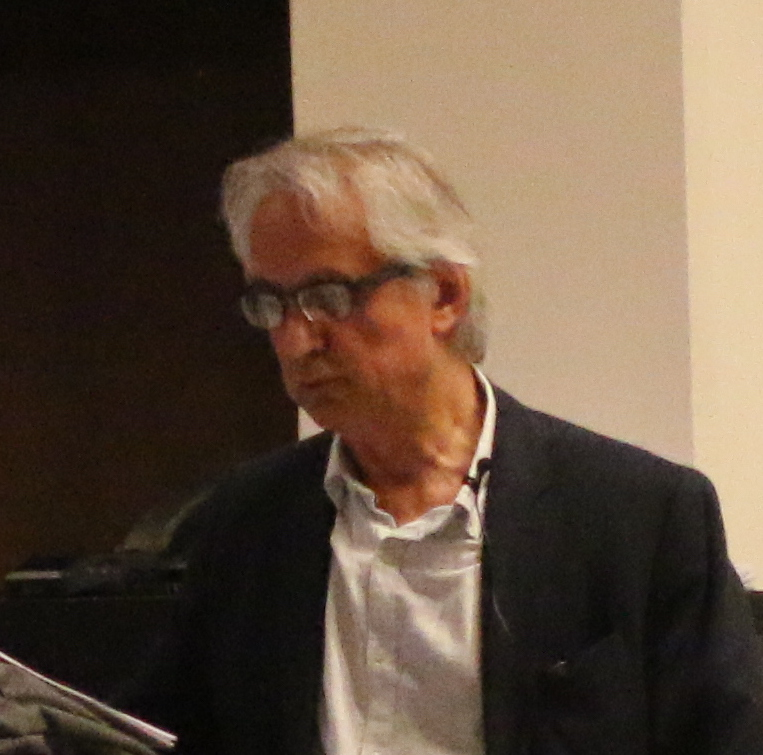
- Born: 1954 (age 71–72) village near Tehran, Iran
- Occupation: professor of sociology
- Spouse: Linda Herrera

Academic background
- Education: University of Kent (PhD); University of California, Berkeley
- Thesis: Workers and workers' control in the Iranian revolution, 1979-1982: implications for the third world (1984)
- Doctoral advisor: Frank Furedi

Academic work
- Discipline: Sociology
- Institutions: University of Illinois at Urbana-Champaign, American University in Cairo, Leiden University (ISIM),
- Main interests: Social movements, Urban studies, Post-Islamism
- Notable works: Life as Politics; Making Islam Democratic; Street Politics

Asef Bayat is an Iranian-American professor of sociology. He currently holds the Catherine and Bruce Bastian Chair in Global and Transnational Studies in the Department of Sociology at the University of Illinois Urbana-Champaign. Bayat's works focuses on social movements and social change, religion and public life, and urban space and politics and contemporary Middle Eastern societies. Prior to his tenure at Illinois, Bayat was a faculty member at the American University in Cairo and served as the director of the International Institute for the Study of Islam in the Modern World (ISIM) at Leiden University, The Netherlands, where he also held the chair of Society and Culture of the Modern Middle East. Additionally, he has held visiting positions at the University of California, Berkeley; Columbia University; the University of Oxford; and Brown University.

== Personal life ==
Asef Bayat was born in 1954 in an Azerbaijani family in a small village near Tehran, where he attended a makeshift school in a warehouse with minimal instruction. Later, his family moved to the capital city, where his first schooling experience was with an Islamic institution. He obtained a diploma in a state-run high school, which was located close to the Hosseiniyeh Ershad, where many of Ali Shariati’s followers were gathering. He attended Shariati’s popular lectures in the Hosseiniyeh Ershad in his last high school years. However, by this time, he had become an entirely secular teenager, moving into leftist campus politics that he maintained throughout his higher education in the United Kingdom. He is married to social anthropologist Linda Herrera.

== Academic career ==
Bayat completed his B.A. in politics from the Faculty of Political and Social Sciences in Tehran in 1977 and earned his Ph.D. in sociology and politics from the University of Kent between 1978 and 1984. Following his doctorate, he held a postdoctoral research fellowship at the Center for Middle Eastern Studies at the University of California, Berkeley, in 1985.

In 1986, Bayat moved to Egypt to teach at the American University in Cairo (AUC). Throughout his academic career, Bayat has taught sociology, including at the American University in Cairo for approximately 17 years. During this time in Egypt, he studied labor movements and informal politics in Egypt and Iran, leading to the publication of his books Street Politics and Work, Politics, and Power.

Bayat served as the director of the International Institute for the Study of Islam in the Modern World (ISIM) holding the chair of Society and Culture of the Modern Middle East at Leiden University in the Netherlands from 2003 to 2010. Since 2010, he has been a sociology and Middle East studies professor at University of Illinois. He has held the Catherine and Bruce Bastian Chair of Global and Transnational Studies since 2012.

== Scholarship ==
Bayat’s scholarship involves three broad areas of inquiry: Religion and Public Life; Social Movements and Social Change; and Urban Space and Politics. He examines the intricate interplay between Islam and democracy, foregrounding the concept of “post-Islamism” as a response to the internal contradictions of Islamic states and the expansive social changes they undergo. Drawing on extensive field research among marginalized groups in the Middle East, Bayat emphasizes the transformative capacity of ordinary people—acting both individually and collectively—to reshape political and moral orders. Unlike many academics who primarily interpret existing sociological frameworks, Bayat applies and extends them to develop new analytical concepts—such as “non-movements,” “street politics,” “post-Islamism,” “refolution,” and “the quiet encroachment of everyday life.” These conceptual tools serve not only to describe social phenomena but also to critique authoritarian governance and neoliberal economic structures.

Bayat further challenges Western social movement theories for their overemphasis on democratic contexts, arguing instead for an analytical framework that more accurately captures the dynamics of popular agency in the mostly undemocratic Middle Eastern settings. By foregrounding internal forces as catalysts for social and political transformation, his scholarship provides a lens through which to understand collective action, grassroots mobilization, new generation of 21st Century revolutions, and the evolving nature of everyday life. These ideas have significantly influenced academic perspectives on political activism, religious expression, and social change both in the region and beyond.

=== Post-Islamism ===
Bayat coined the term “Post-Islamism” in the essay “The Coming of a Post-Islamist Society” in 1995. The concept evolved in Bayat’s subsequent works. Post-Islamism is a theoretical framework that seeks to reconcile Islamic values with democratic principles, individual freedoms, and civil rights. Introduced prominently in works such as Making Islam Democratic: Social Movements and the Post-Islamist Turn (2007) and Post-Islamism: The Changing Faces of Political Islam (2013), Bayat argues that post-Islamism emerged in response to the shortcomings of the Iranian Islamic Revolution and the declining influence of radical Islamist movements—an evolution made especially evident by the Arab Spring. He posits that post-Islamism manifests both as a social “condition” and a political “project”, emphasizing a “religious democracy” that upholds cultural plurality and personal liberties. In explaining the shift from Islamism to post-Islamism, Bayat contends that political Islam often attracts urban middle classes by exploiting the state’s neglect of the poor; however, its future depends on reimagining religiosity to align with democratic ideals—a process that involves reinterpreting religion as a social construct, thereby enabling marginalized groups to creatively reinvent their faith to meet modern aspirations. Moreover, he maintains that Islam itself is neither inherently democratic nor authoritarian, but its political orientation is determined by ongoing power struggles.

Bayat further challenges prevailing assumptions by asserting that subaltern populations in the Middle East actively mobilize through diverse traditions of activism—including those of leftists, unionists, women, Islamists, and post-Islamists—rather than passively enduring adverse conditions. He contends that for the Muslim Brotherhood to emerge as a dominant force in civil and political society, revolutionary forces must support post-Islamist factions that expand democratic space while rejecting exclusivist, opportunistic, or populist practices. His analysis of post-Islamist reform projects in Iran (1997–2004) illustrates efforts to bolster human rights, free-market ideas, and religious freedoms, even though these initiatives ultimately collided with entrenched anti-democratic structures, thereby reducing traditional Islamism’s political legitimacy. Furthermore, Bayat explores shifts in societal practices—such as the emergence of “post-Islamist piety” among Egypt’s upper classes and the rise of post-Islamist feminism in Iran, which merges civil and religious rights to transform gender power relations. His scholarship, bolstered by his contributions at the Wissenschaftskolleg zu Berlin and his analysis of youth activism that redefines religious expression in Iran and Egypt, remains pivotal for understanding the evolving dynamics of political Islam and the potential for religion to underpin democratic reforms.

=== Street politics ===
Bayat’s work on street politics conceptualizes urban public spaces as vital arenas for political engagement, particularly for marginalized communities excluded from formal political institutions. He defines street politics as a process whereby ordinary citizens mobilize through everyday acts of resistance—transforming urban streets into “stages for political confrontation” that articulate collective grievances and demands for reform. Iconic sites such as Tahrir Square in Cairo have come to symbolize this mode of resistance, having inspired protest models in thousands of cities worldwide. In a 2012 interview, Bayat noted that when street politics becomes untenable, alternative avenues reminiscent of the color revolutions in ex‐Soviet republics can be expected.

Bayat’s analysis extends beyond symbolic spaces to examine the everyday practices that underpin urban resistance. He highlights informal economic activities—such as street vending, squatting, and unauthorized access to urban services—as strategies through which subaltern groups challenge exclusionary state policies and assert their rights via “quiet encroachment” on urban space. By critiquing conventional models of political activism that prioritize formal institutional mobilization, Bayat champions the legitimacy of non-movements and the subtle, persistent forms of dissent emerging in everyday life. Moreover, he argues that neoliberal policies have eroded traditional welfare structures, redirecting grassroots activism toward roles within non-governmental organizations and reshaping urban governance through digital networks and state encroachment.

Further, Bayat’s framework underscores the transformative potential of these informal practices in reconfiguring urban citizenship. He documents how the struggles of the urban poor and marginalized groups—including Muslim women—contribute to emerging forms of collective urban identity and call for a postcolonial reassessment of urban studies in the Global South. Through his detailed critique of both state power and conventional protest paradigms, Bayat provides a nuanced perspective on how everyday resistance can catalyse broader political and social transformation.

=== Quiet encroachment ===
Bayat’s concept of “quiet encroachment of the ordinary” describes the gradual and informal strategies through which marginalized urban groups secure their basic needs and assert their presence in the city. In his book Street Politics, Bayat argues that global restructuring and neoliberal policies have further excluded these groups, compelling them to demand economic rights and social participation via subtle acts—such as illegal construction, informal trade, and unauthorized access to essential utilities—that cumulatively drive significant social and legal reforms. He characterizes this incremental process as “the quiet encroachment of the ordinary,” emphasizing that even if marginalized populations are not fully versed in market rhetoric, they nonetheless resist its effects through everyday strategies of survival, thereby enriching social movement theory by demonstrating how subaltern agency can shape urban spaces without traditional collective organization.

By examining experiences in Egypt and other Middle Eastern cities, Bayat illustrates how scattered, persistent efforts—such as the formation of squatter settlements, building makeshift homes, or the gradual encroachment on public space—force authorities to adapt urban policies and eventually legitimize these informal districts.

His analysis further highlights that women in the Islamic Republic of Iran have redefined everyday norms by subtly challenging state-imposed dress codes through practices like wearing “bad hijab”. These extra-legal strategies disrupt established police oversight and state control, opening new opportunities for marginalized groups to claim urban welfare, assert identity, and reconfigure urban governance. Moreover, by demonstrating broader opposition to the marketization of society, Bayat contends that these quiet encroachments form the foundation for gradual, democratic reforms that enable subaltern groups to gain access to public goods, urban space, and economic opportunities without direct confrontation with the state.

=== Non-movements ===
Bayat’s work in Middle East studies introduces the concept of “non‑movements”—everyday, decentralized acts of resistance by ordinary people that challenge authoritarian regimes without resorting to formal protest. In the book Life as Politics, he describes these “social non‑movements” as the collective action of non‑collective actors, wherein dispersed individuals and groups engage in fleeting, mundane yet contentious practices to improve life chances in areas such as housing, employment, and social freedoms. Rather than organized mobilizations, these actions—ranging from illegal land occupations and street vending to informal networks among youth, women, and migrants—produce what Bayat terms a “quiet encroachment of the ordinary,” gradually reshaping urban norms and dispelling assumptions of an unchanging social order.

Although non‑movements do not typically pursue outright regime change, they can merge with overt street activism—as witnessed during the Arab Spring—to form a potent counterforce against authoritarian governance. Bayat explains that these decentralized practices operate through a “logic of praxis” whereby individuals address everyday needs, from informal housing to personal autonomy, without relying on formal organizations or explicit ideologies. Over time, the cumulative effect of these actions compels authorities to adapt, granting marginalized groups a measure of de facto citizenship and challenging neoliberal economic constraints and state surveillance.

Bayat’s scholarship further illustrates that non‑movements, integral to his broader “life as politics” framework, have evolved from early studies of factory workers during the 1979 Iranian Revolution to contemporary analyses of urban poor, Muslim youth, and women. His research highlights how these everyday acts of resistance—not only disrupt entrenched power structures but also foster alternative norms and social solidarity that pave the way for broader societal transformation. Ultimately, by revealing how marginalized populations persistently reshape their societies through the ordinary domains of daily life, Bayat’s concept of non‑movements offers a nuanced understanding of resistance that challenges conventional models of collective activism.

== Selected bibliography ==
=== Books ===
- Revolutionary Life: The Everyday of the Arab Spring (Harvard University Press, 2021)
- Global Middle East: Into the 21st Century, ed. with Linda Herrera (University of California Press, 2021)
- Revolution without Revolutionaries: Making Sense of the Arab Spring Stanford University Press, 2017
- Post-Islamism: The Changing Faces of Political Islam. Oxford University Press, 2013.
- Being Young and Muslim: New Cultural Politics in the Global South and North. (co-edited with Linda Herrera.) New York: Oxford University Press, 2010.
- Life as Politics: How Ordinary People Change the Middle East. Stanford: Stanford University Press, 2010, 2nd Edition 2013.
- Islam and Democracy: What Is the Real Question? Amsterdam University Press, 2007.
- Making Islam Democratic: Social Movements and the Post-Islamist Turn. Stanford: Stanford University Press, 2007.
- Street Politics: Poor Peoples Movements in Iran. New York: Columbia University Press, 1997.
- Work, Politics and Power. New York: Monthly Review Press, 1991.
- Workers and Revolution in Iran. London: Zed Books, 1987.

=== Articles ===
- Bayat, Asef "Is Iran on the Verge of another Revolution?”, Journal of Democracy, vol. 34, no. 2, April 2023.
- Bayat, Asef (October 2015) "Plebeians of the Arab Spring", Current Anthropology, vol. 56, no. 11.
- Bayat, Asef (2013) "The Making of Post-Islamist Iran", in A. Bayat, ed., Post-Islamism: The Changing Faces of Political Islam, New York, Oxford University Press.
- Bayat, Asef (2013) "Egypt and Its Unsettled Islamism", in A. Bayat, ed., Post-Islamism: The Changing Faces of Political Islam", New York, Oxford University Press.
- Bayat, Asef (2012) "Islamic Movements", in David Snow, et al. (eds.) Encyclopedia of Social and Political Movements, Oxford and New York, Blackwell.
- Bayat, Asef (April 26, 2011) "The Post-Islamist Revolutions", Foreign Affairs.
- Bayat, Asef (2011) "Marginality: Curse or Cure?", in Ray Bush and Habib Ayeb (eds.) Marginality and Exclusion in Egypt, London, Zed Books.
- Bayat, Asef (October 2007). "Islamism and the Politics of Fun". Public Culture. 19 (3): 433–459. doi:10.1215/08992363-2007-004.
- Bayat, Asef (September 2007). "Radical Religion and the Habitus of the Dispossessed: Does Islamic Militancy Have an Urban Ecology?". International Journal of Urban and Regional Research. 31 (3): 579–590. doi:10.1111/j.1468-2427.2007.00746.x.
- Bayat, Asef (September 2005). "Islamism and Social Movement Theory". Third World Quarterly. 26 (6): 891–908. doi:10.1080/01436590500089240. JSTOR 4017816. S2CID 143656715. Pdf.
- Bayat, Asef (February 2002). "Activism and Social Development in the Middle East". International Journal of Middle East Studies. 34 (1): 1–28. doi:10.1017/S0020743802001010. hdl:1887/9803. S2CID 36218868.
- Bayat, Asef (Winter 2001). "Studying Middle Eastern Societies: Imperatives and Modalities of Thinking Comparatively". Middle East Studies Association Bulletin. 35 (2): 151–158. doi:10.1017/S0026318400043315. hdl:1887/9802. JSTOR 23063462. S2CID 153290973.
- Bayat, Asef (September 2000). "From 'Dangerous Classes' to 'Quiet Rebels': Politics of Urban Subaltern in the Global South". International Sociology. 15 (3): 533–557. doi:10.1177/026858000015003005. S2CID 41053273.
- Bayat, Asef (January 1998). "Revolution without Movement, Movement without Revolution: Comparing Islamist Activism in Iran and Egypt". Comparative Studies in Society and History. 40 (1): 136–169. doi:10.1017/S0010417598980057. JSTOR 179392. S2CID 54197847.
- Bayat, Asef (March 1997). "Un-Civil Society: The Politics of the 'Informal People'". Third World Quarterly. 18 (1): 53–72. doi:10.1080/01436599715055. hdl:1887/9769. Pdf.
- Bayat, Asef (1992). "Work Ethics in Islam: A Comparison with Protestantism". The Islamic Quarterly. 36 (2): 5–27.
- Bayat, Asef (April 1990). "Shari'ati and Marx: A Critique of an "Islamic" Critique of Marxism". Alif: Journal of Comparative Poetics. 10 (10): 19–41. doi:10.2307/521715. JSTOR 521715. Available online.
