= Street Politics =

1997 book by Asef Bayat

Street Politics: Poor People's Movements in Iran: Bayat, Asef
- Author: Asef Bayat
- Language: English
- Subject: Political Theory, Iran, Iranian Revolution
- Publisher: Columbia University Press
- Publication date: November 25, 1997
- Publication place: United States
- Media type: Print (Hardcover and Paperback)
- Pages: 256
- ISBN: 978-0-231-10859-1
- OCLC: 36876093
- Dewey Decimal: 322.44
- LC Class: HV4132.56.A5 B39 1997

Street Politics: Poor People's Movements in Iran is a non-fiction sociological study by Asef Bayat that examines how ordinary Iranians, under a powerful state, sought to secure livelihoods and basic stability. The book advances a framework of informal, everyday politics—what Bayat terms the "quiet encroachment of the ordinary"—to explain collective action outside formal organizations.

Drawing on historical analysis, archival materials, surveys, interviews, and field observation, the study focuses on urban poor constituencies—including squatters, street vendors, and the unemployed—primarily from the late 1970s to the early 1990s. The author's insider vantage in depicting street-level politics in poorer districts of Tehran is also noted.

The work is placed alongside classic analyses of poor people's movements by Frances Fox Piven and Richard Cloward, highlighting comparative dimensions beyond Iran. It addresses the social and political interests of disenfranchised groups during the revolution and reassesses their role in the post-revolutionary period, while engaging the 1979 Iranian Revolution in a broader frame. The approach is grounded in presenting Iran's politics and history from lower-class perspectives and outside dominant paradigms.

== Background ==
Bayat's interest in the subject is rooted in his own life experience, which he recounts in the book's preface. Having grown up in the poorer districts of Tehran, he brings an insider vantage to the study. Two decades of research on the working class in Iran and other developing countries informed his approach to the difficulties of examining collective action among disadvantaged groups. Shaped by growing up among his subjects and by participation in movements that embraced the poor, the study also reflects elements of personal and family background. Bayat's main research strands include social movements, urban space, comparative Islamism, and development politics.

Street Politics extends Bayat's earlier trajectory. As in his previous study of the working class in Iran, he challenges the popular assumption that urban squatters uniformly joined the revolution and provided a secure base for Islamist leadership; in Workers and Revolution in Iran he argued the absence of vanguard leadership among workers during the 1979 revolution. The book draws on personal experience in Iran, interviews conducted there, and documentary materials such as newspapers and archives. It is characterized as a historical narrative grounded in personal experience and a range of primary sources, including interviews.

The urban focus is situated in demographic and policy shifts preceding the revolution: in the years before 1979, thousands of poor families migrated to cities in search of better lives. The "new urban poor" emerged in part from modernization policies initiated in the 1930s by Reza Shah Pahlavi and continued by Mohammad Reza Shah, which produced rapid urban growth and new social classes.

Within this setting, the study examines how structurally disempowered urban groups—engaged in continual struggles in, about, and for urban space—exercise social power through ordinary, surreptitious, and unassuming means to secure survival. One observation emphasized in readings of the book is that advances for poor communities depended less on revolutionary regime change than on the respite afforded by the revolutionary period itself.

== Synopsis ==
Street Politics: Poor People's Movements in Iran advances two linked ideas to explain collective action outside formal organizations: "street politics," defined as episodic conflicts between a collective populace and authorities in the social and physical space of streets, and the "quiet encroachment of the ordinary," a slow, patient advance by ordinary people on the propertied and powerful to survive and improve life. Using these concepts, Bayat analyzes how squatters, the unemployed, and street vendors pressed claims over housing, jobs, services, and public space in Tehran and other cities before and after 1979.

The book profiles Iran's "new poor," a stratum marked not only by low income, skill, and status but by a social and cultural identity tied to marginal residence. Bayat traces their emergence to modernization policies under Reza Shah and Mohammad Reza Shah that fueled rapid urban growth and peripheral settlements. By the late 1970s, Tehran alone included roughly 50 squatter communities with about 400,000 residents, and at least one million people in slum districts by 1980.

Organizationally, these actors are largely atomized, lacking strong leadership or cohesive ideology; they rely on passive networks rooted in family, kinship, and neighborhood that activate when survival is threatened (e.g., evictions, denial of work, vendor intimidation). Their practices are presented as non-ideological and governed by necessity, yet capable of effective offensive action in defense of incremental gains. Bayat identifies two recurrent aims: redistribution of goods and services and autonomy from bureaucratic regulation.

The study documents repeated crackdowns by clerical and state authorities when squatters, unemployed groups, and vendors were seen to threaten political, socioeconomic, or moral order, alongside phases of limited concessions and de facto tolerance—for example, channeling vendors into managed markets that conceded livelihood while extending surveillance. Positioned comparatively, the analysis highlights commonalities with poor people's movements elsewhere and engages debates associated with Piven & Cloward, James Scott, Foucault, and Gramsci, moving beyond marginality theses and Chicago-School passivism; it also argues that Muslim Middle Easterners are not fundamentally different from other low-income groups in the developing world.

Methodologically, reviewers note an empirical approach grounded in daily newspapers and roughly one hundred interviews, including material on informal organizations rarely used previously in English-language Iranian studies; they also remark on an accessible style that conveys the street-level texture of Tehran's poorer districts.
