= William Burke-White =

American law professor and policy advisor

Professor William Burke-White
- Occupation: Law professor

Academic work
- Institutions: University of Pennsylvania Law School

William Burke-White is an American professor, legal scholar and policy advisor. He is a Professor of Law at the University of Pennsylvania Carey Law School, where he was the Inaugural Director of Perry World House, an interdisciplinary global policy research institute. He has also served as an advisor at the US State Department as a member of the Policy Planning Staff.

== Education ==
He graduated from Harvard in 1998 with an A.B. in Russian and American History and Literature and obtained a M.Phil. in international relations at Cambridge in 1999. Burke-White earned a J.D. at the Harvard Law School in 2002 and returned to Cambridge as a Fulbright Scholar where he completed his Ph.D. in international relations in 2006.

== Career ==
From 2003 to 2005 he taught at Princeton University and served as special assistant to Anne-Marie Slaughter.

In 2005, Burke-White became an assistant professor at the University of Pennsylvania Law School.

In 2008 Burke-White won a research fellowship from the Alexander von Humboldt Foundation. He was a visiting professor at the Max Planck Institute for Comparative Public Law and International Law.

From 2009 to 2011 he was on leave to serve as a member of the Secretary's Policy Planning Staff at the U.S. Department of State. He is the principal drafter of the Quadrennial Diplomacy and Development Review.

In 2010 he was promoted to full professor and from 2011 to 2013 he served as deputy dean of Penn Law. He was visiting professor of law at Harvard Law School in 2013.

In May 2014 he was appointed as the Inaugural Perry Professor and director of Perry World House, the University of Pennsylvania's international affairs institute.

He has written extensively in the fields of international criminal law, international investment law, and human rights. He has served as an expert witness in ICSID litigations for a number of governments, most notably the Republic of Argentina.

In 2023, he filed under the Foreign Agents Registration Act (FARA) to act for the Ukrainian Orthodox Church (UOC), declaring receipt of $7000, with Amsterdam & Partners LLP, the law firm representing Russian-born Ukrainian billionaire Vadym Novynskyi and the UOC, listed as his client. Burke-White and Amsterdam & Partners LLP have argued that the UOC is being persecuted by the Ukrainian government.
