= Digest of Middle East Studies =

- Discipline: Political science
- Language: English
- Edited by: Catherine Warrick

Publication details
- History: 1992-present
- Publisher: Wiley-Blackwell on behalf of the Policy Studies Organization
- Frequency: Quarterly

Standard abbreviations
- ISO 4: Dig. Middle East Stud.

Indexing
- ISSN: 1060-4367 (print); 1949-3606 (web)

Links
- Journal homepage; Online access; Online archive

Digest of Middle East Studies is a quarterly peer-reviewed academic journal published by Wiley-Blackwell on behalf of the Policy Studies Organization. The journal was established in 1992 with Mohammed M. Aman (University of Wisconsin–Milwaukee) as original editor-in-chief. It is currently edited by Catherine Warrick (Villanova University), with Devn Thomas serving as editorial assistant. The journal focuses on Middle Eastern studies, particularly regarding religion and politics.
