= David Menashri =

Israeli academic

David Menashri (Hebrew: דוד מנשרי; born 1944) is an Israeli professor and scholar of modern Iranian history. A leading Iranian expert, he is also the founding director of The Alliance Center for Iranian Studies at Tel Aviv University.

== Biography ==
David Menashri received his Ph.D. in Middle Eastern history from Tel Aviv University in 1982. He spent two years in Iran on the eve of the 1979 revolution conducting research in Iranian universities.

== Academic career ==
Menashri's research focuses on Iranian politics, society and religion, Shia political Islam and the history of education in the Middle East.

He is currently Senior Research Fellow at the Alliance Center for Modern Iranian History and the Moshe Dayan Center for Middle Eastern and African Studies.

Until his retirement in 2011, he taught and conducted research at the university. Among others, he served as the Chair of the Department of Middle Eastern and African History (1996-2000); the first incumbent of the Parviz and Pouran Nazarian Chair for Modern Iranian Studies (1997-2011), the first such a chair in Israel; Founder and first Director of the Alliance Center for Iranian Studies (2005-2010), the first such center in Israel and one of only few in the world then; Head of Special Programs Unit (2001-2005) and Dean of Special Programs (2005-2009). Between 2011 and 2015, Menashri was President of the College of Law and Business in Ramat Gan.

An internationally recognized scholar and lecturer, Professor Menashri was a visiting scholar at Princeton University, Cornell University, the University of Chicago, Yale University, the University of Oxford, the University of Melbourne, Monash University (Australia), LMU Munich, the University of Mainz, and Waseda University (Tokyo). He has received grants from the Ford Foundation, Fulbright Foundation and Ben Gurion Foundation.

== Public activism ==
Menashri has been active in numerous NGOs, including: Council Member of Pugwash Conferences on Science and World Affairs (awardee of the 1995 Nobel Peace Prize), since 2013; Board Member of Scholars for Peace in the Middle East, since 2011; Chairman of the Maccabim Scholarship Foundation, since 1995. He has also been the Chairman of the International Sephardic Education Fund in Israel (1997-2006); President of the Iranian Jewish Federation in Israel (1982-1996).

== Published works ==
- Iran in Revolution (Tel Aviv, 1989; in Hebrew)
- Iran: A Decade of War and Revolution (New York, 1990)
- The Iranian Revolution and the Muslim World (ed., Boulder, CO, 1991)
- Education and the Making of Modern Iran (Ithaca, NY, 1992)
- Islamic Fundamentalism: A Challenge to Regional Stability (ed., Tel Aviv, 1993; in Hebrew)
- Iran: Between Islam and the West (Tel Aviv, 1996; in Hebrew)
- Revolution at a Crossroads: Iran's Domestic Politics and Regional Ambitions (Washington, DC, 1997)
- Central Asia Meets the Middle East (ed., London, 1998)
- Post-Revolutionary Politics in Iran: Religion, Society and Power (London, 2001)
- Religion and State in the Middle East (co-ed. with Liora Hendelman Baavour, Tel Aviv, 2006; in Hebrew)

== See also ==
- Iran-Israeli relations
