= Eric Hooglund =

American political scientist

Eric James Hooglund (born March 18, 1944) is an American political scientist and an expert on contemporary Iran. Since 2010 he has been a senior research professor at the Center for Middle Eastern Studies at Lund University in Sweden.

Hooglund was born in Waterville, Maine, and was educated at the University of Maine at Orono, from where he revived a BA in history in 1966. He was a Peace Corps Volunteer in Iran (1966–68) and subsequently undertook graduate studies at Johns Hopkins University under Islamic law scholar, Majid Khadduri, receiving a PhD in international relations and Middle Eastern Studies in 1975. During his doctoral field research in Iran in the early 1970s, he worked with Hamid Enayat, Nader Afshar Naderi, Javad Safinejad and Mostafa Azkia. His dissertation on the politics of land reform became his first published book, Land and Revolution in Rural Iran, 1960–1980, and it shows the influence of the ideas of James Scott, Eric Wolf, and Barrington Moore, Jr. on his approach to the study of peasant societies and rural resistance movements.

Hooglund was a member of the editorial collective of Middle East Report published by MERIP, later was editor of the Middle East Journal and since 1995 has been editor of Middle East Critique. He also has worked for several Middle East-focused non-governmental organizations, including the Carnegie Endowment for International Peace, the National Security Archive, and the Institute for Palestine Studies. His teaching experience includes Bates College and Bowdoin College in Maine, Ohio State University, the University of California, Berkeley, St. Antony's College, Oxford, Shiraz University in Iran, and Middle East Technical University in Turkey.

Hooglund has published several books and over 100 articles related to Iranian culture, government, history, international relations, literature, migration, political economy, sociology, and religion. Although trained as a political scientist his best-known work falls in the category of rural political economy and sociology.

== List of Iran publications ==
- Navigating Contemporary Iran: Challenging Economic, Social & Political Perceptions (co-edited with Leif Stenberg, Routledge, 2012). ISBN 0415678668
- Gender in Contemporary Iran (co-edited with Roksana Bahramitash, Routledge, 2011)
- "Iran, A Country Study" (co-edited with Glenn Curtis, GPO, 2009)
- "Iran in Transition: Twenty Years of Social Change Since 1979 (Syracuse University Press, 2002)
- "Iranian Revolution and the Islamic Republic" (co-edited Nikki Keddie, Syracuse University Press, 1986)
- "Land and Revolution in Iran, 1960–1980" (University of Texas Press, 1982)
