= International Studies Journal =

- Language: English and Persian
- Edited by: Mehdi Zakerian

Publication details
- History: 2004 - present
- Publisher: Private group of professors (Iran)
- Frequency: Quarterly

Standard abbreviations
- ISO 4: Int. Stud. J.

Indexing
- ISSN: 1735-2045
- OCLC no.: 896188467

Links
- Journal homepage; Online archive (English); [--> {{{link5-name}}}]

The International Studies Journal (ISJ) (Faṣlnāmah-i muṭālaʻāt-i bayn al-milalī) is an international academic journal dealing with the Middle East. It is published quarterly since 2004, in both English and Persian, with some articles in French. It is distributed in Iran and overseas, and run by a group of faculty from Iran and elsewhere.

The scope includes both the modern middle east, and international social and legal issue having some relation to the area and the problems.

The Editor in Chief is Pr. Dr. Mehdi Zakerian. President, Iranian International Studies Association.
