= Middle East Critique =

- Discipline: Middle Eastern studies
- Language: English
- Edited by: Matteo Capasso, Northwest University, People's Republic of China

Publication details
- Former name: Critique: Critical Middle Eastern Studies
- History: Founded 1992
- Publisher: Taylor & Francis (United Kingdom)
- Frequency: Quarterly
- Impact factor: 1.7

Standard abbreviations
- ISO 4: Middle East Crit.

Indexing
- ISSN: 1943-6149 (print); 1943-6157 (web)
- LCCN: 2008202048

Links
- Journal homepage

Middle East Critique is a peer-reviewed Middle Eastern studies journal published by Taylor & Francis. The journal ranks 26/182 in Area Studies, thus firmly belonging to the top Q1. It is also included in the Social Sciences Citation Index (SSCI).

An editorial collective brought out the first issue of Critique: Critical Middle Eastern Studies in the fall of 1992. For the following 18 years, the journal's academic home remained Hamline University, while the name of the journal changed to Middle East Critique in 2009. Eric Hooglund was appointed as the journal's full-time Editor in January 1995, and from 2002 the journal was published by Taylor and Francis. Matteo Capasso is the current Editor of the journal, supported by a large collective of international scholars.
