= Middle Eastern studies =

Academic discipline

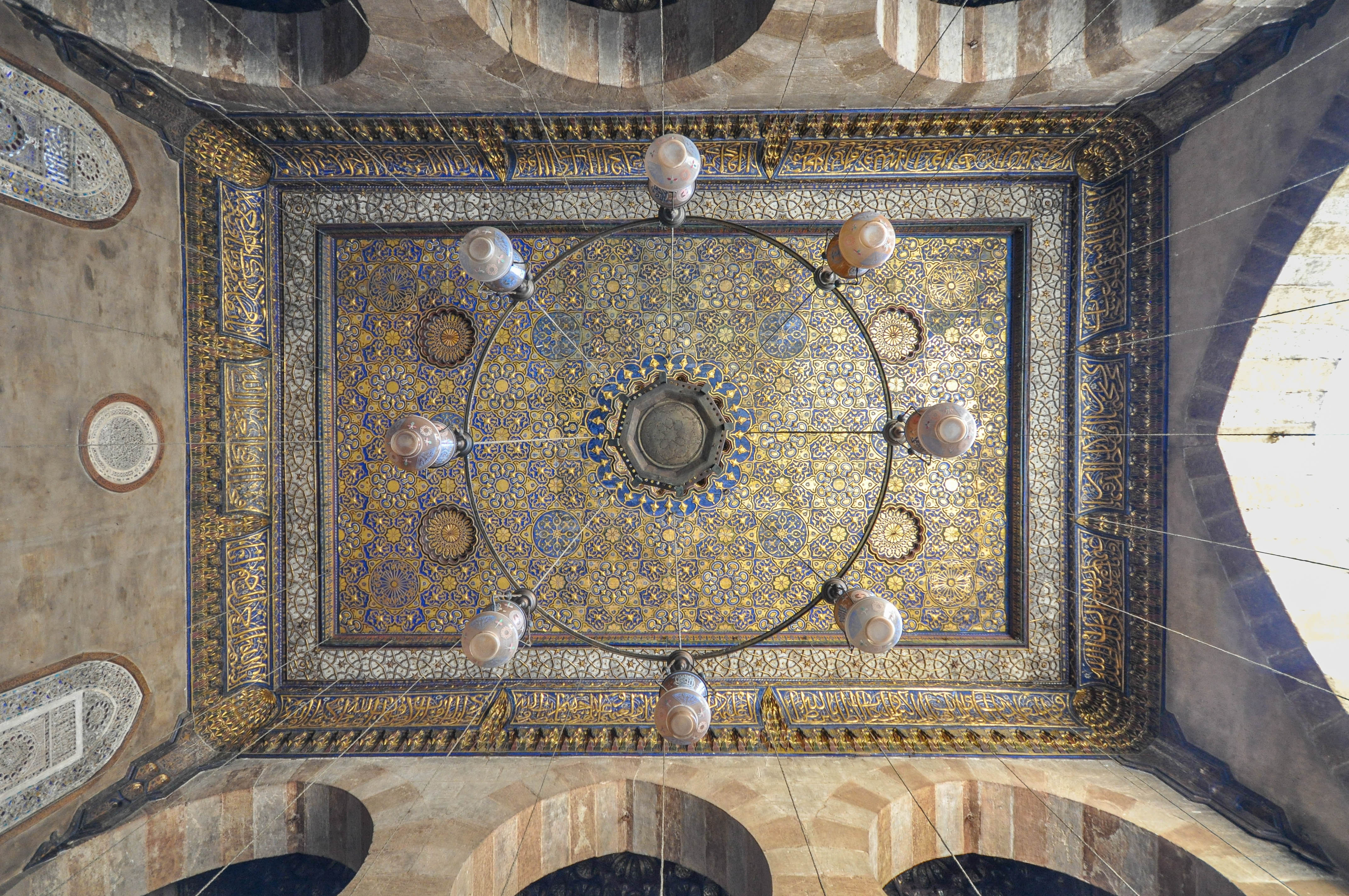
Ceiling of the Mosque-Madrassa of Sultan Barquq, Cairo

Middle Eastern studies, sometimes referred to as Near Eastern studies, West Asian studies, or Southwestern Asian studies, is a name given to a number of academic programs associated with the study of the history, culture, politics, economies, and geography of the Middle East, an area that is generally interpreted to cover a range of nations including Egypt, Iran, Iraq, Israel, Jordan, Lebanon, Oman, Palestine, Saudi Arabia, Syria, Turkey, and Yemen. It is considered a form of area studies, taking an overtly interdisciplinary approach to the study of a region. In this sense Middle Eastern studies is a far broader and less traditional field than classical Islamic studies.

The subject was historically regarded as part of Oriental studies, which also included East Asian studies and Egyptology and other specialisms in the ancient civilizations of the region; the growth of the field of study in the West is treated at that article. Many academic faculties still cover both areas. Although some academic programs combine Middle Eastern studies with Islamic studies, based on the preponderance of Muslims in the region (with Israel and Lebanon being the only exceptions), others maintain these areas of study as separate disciplines.

== Reception ==
In 1978 Edward Said, a Palestinian American professor of comparative literature at Columbia University, published his book Orientalism, in which he accused earlier scholars of a "subtle and persistent Eurocentric prejudice against Arab-Islamic peoples and their culture", claiming the bias amounted to a justification for imperialism. Western academics such as Irwin challenged Said's conclusions, however the book became a standard text of literary theory and cultural studies.

Following the September 11 attacks, U.S. Middle Eastern studies programs were criticized as inattentive to issues of Islamic terrorism. Israeli-American historian Martin Kramer published a 2001 book, Ivory Towers on Sand: The Failure of Middle Eastern Studies in America, and Wall Street Journal article claiming that Middle Eastern studies courses were "part of the problem, not its remedy." In a Foreign Affairs review of the book, F. Gregory Gause said his analysis was, in part, "serious and substantive" but "far too often his valid points are overshadowed by academic score-settling and major inconsistencies."

In 2002, American writer Daniel Pipes established an organisation called Campus Watch to combat what he perceived to be serious problems within the discipline, including "analytical failures, the mixing of politics with scholarship, intolerance of alternative views, apologetics, and the abuse of power over students". He encouraged students to advise the organization of problems at their campuses. In turn critics within the discipline such as John Esposito accused him of "McCarthyism". Professors denounced by Pipes as "left-wing extremists" were often harassed with hate speech. Pipes was appointed to the United States Institute of Peace board of directors by George W. Bush, despite protests from the Arab American community.

== Academic centers ==
=== United Kingdom ===
- The Middle East Centre (MEC) at St Antony's College, University of Oxford
- Institute of Arab and Islamic Studies at University of Exeter
- SOAS Middle East Institute at School of Oriental and African Studies
- School of Oriental and African Studies at University of London
- Department of Middle Eastern Studies at King's College London, University of London

=== United States ===
- Center for Contemporary Arab Studies at Georgetown University
- Middle Eastern Studies Center at Duke University
- Center for Middle Eastern Studies at the University of Chicago
- Center for Middle Eastern Studies at the University of Arizona
- Center for Middle Eastern and North African Studies and Middle East Studies at the University of Michigan
- Department of African, Middle Eastern, and South Asian Languages and Literatures at Rutgers, the State University of New Jersey
- Institute for Middle East Studies at George Washington University
- Center for Middle Eastern Studies at Harvard University
- Middle East Center at the University of Pennsylvania
- Middle East Center at the University of Washington Henry M. Jackson School of International Studies
- Middle Eastern and Islamic Studies at New York University
- Middle East/South Asian Studies Program at UC Davis
- Middle Eastern Studies at the University of Texas
- UCLA Center for Near East Studies
- Brigham Young University Jerusalem Center for Near Eastern Studies

=== Middle East ===
- Institute of Middle East and Islamic Countries at Marmara University in Istanbul, Turkey
- Sakarya University Middle East Institute at Sakarya University in Sakarya, Turkey
- Center for Arab and Middle Eastern Studies at the American University of Beirut in Beirut, Lebanon
- Institut français du Proche-Orient (IFPO), the French Institute for the Near East, in Damascus, Beirut and Amman
- Middle East Studies Center at American University in Cairo in Cairo, Egypt
- Moshe Dayan Center for Middle Eastern and African Studies at Tel Aviv University

=== Europe ===
- Department of Near and Middle Eastern Studies at Trinity College Dublin in Dublin, Ireland
- Center for Middle Eastern Studies at Metropolitan University Prague in Prague, Czech Republic
- Center for Middle Eastern Studies at Lund University in Lund, Sweden
- Center for Near and Middle Eastern Studies at Marburg University in Marburg, Germany
- Center for Modern Oriental Studies at Humboldt University in Berlin, Germany
- Middle Eastern Studies at the Jagiellonian University in Kraków, Poland
- The European Centre for Middle East Studies-ECMES

=== Rest of Asia and Oceania ===
- Middle East Studies Institute at Shanghai International Studies University in Shanghai, China
- West Asia Center at Seoul National University in Seoul, South Korea
- Centre For West Asian Studies at Jamia Millia Islamia in New Delhi, India
- Centre For West Asian Studies at Jawaharlal Nehru University in New Delhi, India
- Center for Arab and Islamic studies of Institute of Orientalism of Russian Academy of Sciences in Moscow, Russia
- Centre for Arab & Islamic Studies (Middle East & Central Asia) at Australian National University in Canberra, Australia
- Department of West Asian Studies and North African Studies at Aligarh Muslim University in Aligarh, India

== See also ==
- Ancient Near East studies
- Iranian studies
- Jewish studies
- Orientalism
- Semitic studies
