= Leif Stenberg =

Leif Erik Stenberg
- Title: Dean

Academic work
- Era: Modern era
- Main interests: Islam & Science; Contemporary Sufism
- Notable works: The Islamization of Science

Leif Stenberg has been the Dean of the Institute for the Study of Muslim Civilisations at the Aga Khan University (International) in London since April 2017.

== Media Appearances ==
Stenberg provided commentary during the Jyllands-Posten Muhammad cartoons controversy. He also appeared on live television to comment on the roots and developments of the Arab Spring.

== List of Publications ==
- Sternö A., L. Stenberg & B. Knutsson (1988), Vetenskap och teknik i Arabvärlden. STU, Stockholm. ISBN 91-7850-253-5.
- Stenberg, L. (1996), The Islamization of Science: Four Muslim Positions Developing an Islamic Modernity. Almqvist & Wiksell International, Stockholm. ISBN 91-22-01723-2.
- Stenberg, L. (1999), Muslimer i Sverige - Lära och Liv. Bilda förlag, Stockholm. ISBN 91-574-5542-2.
- Schaebler B. & L. Stenberg, eds. (2004), Globalization and the Muslim World: Culture, Religion, and Modernity. Syracuse University Press, Syracuse. ISBN 0-8156-3024-7.
- Raudvere C. & L. Stenberg, eds. (2009), Sufism Today. Heritage and Tradition in the Global Community. I.B. Tauris, London. ISBN 978-1-84511-762-7
- Koch, C. & L. Stenberg, eds. (2010), The EU and the GCC: Challenges and Prospects under the Swedish EU Presidency. Gulf Research Center, Dubai. ISBN 978-9948-490-01-2.
- Otterbeck, Jonas & Leif Stenberg (2012), Islamologi: Studiet av en religion. Carlssons, Stockholm.
- Hooglund, Eric & Leif Stenberg, eds. (2012), Navigating Contemporary Iran. Challenging Economic, Social and Political Perceptions. Routledge Advances in Middle East and Islamic Studies, Routledge, London.
- Salamandra, Christa & Leif Stenberg, eds. (2015), Syria from Reform to Revolt Vol. II: Culture, Society and Religion. Syracuse University Press, Syracuse.
- Rickard Lagervall & Leif Stenberg (2016), Muslimska Församlingar och Föreningar i Malmö och Lund – en ögonblicksbild. Rapport, Centrum för Mellanösternstudier, Lunds universitet.
