= Reza Afshari =

Iranian academic

Reza Afshari (Persian: رضا افشاری, died 2025) was a professor of history at Pace University from 1984 to 2014. He emigrated to the United States in 1969 and received his Ph.D. at Temple University. Described by one scholar as "an unapologetic secularist," his studies centered on human rights in Iran, Islamic politics, and Islamic cultural relativism in particular. His book, Human Rights in Iran: the Abuse of Cultural Relativism, has been called "enormously relevant to today's human rights struggles in Iran."

== Representative Publications ==
- "An Essay on Islamic Cultural Relativism in the Discourse of Human Rights", Human Rights Quarterly, Vol. 16, No. 2 (May, 1994), pp. 235-276.
- "On Historiography of Human Rights Discourse", Human Rights Quarterly, 29 (February 2007) 1-67.
- "Discourse and Practice of Human Rights Violations of Iranians of the Baha’i Faith in the Islamic Republic of Iran", a chapter in a book, edited by Dominic Brookshaw of McGill University, Routledge, London, 2007.
- Human Rights in Iran: the Abuse of Cultural Relativism, University of Pennsylvania Press, 2001. Hardcover, pp. 359

== Professional affiliations and awards ==
- Middle East Studies Association of America, Committee for Academic Freedom in the Middle East and North Africa
- International Studies Association Human Rights Section, 2016 Distinguished Scholar Award
