= Middle East Research and Information Project =

Non-profit independent research group

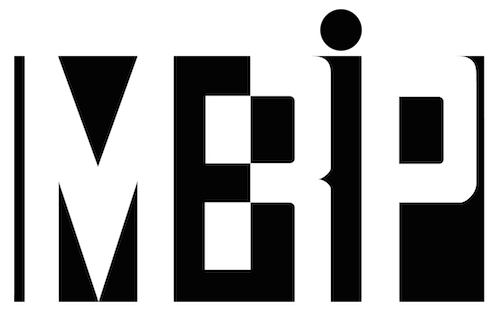
- Logo
- Formation: 1971; 55 years ago
- Website: merip.org

The Middle East Research and Information Project (MERIP) is a non-profit independent research group established in 1971, that publishes critical, alternative reporting and analysis, focusing on state power, political economy, and social hierarchies as well as popular struggles and the role of US policy in the region. Its most prominent publication is Middle East Report, which has been published both online and as a print magazine, and is now fully online and open access.

== History ==
The Palestinian Liberation Organization (PLO) sought to align the Palestinian cause with the global anti-colonial movement, which led a group of anti-Vietnam War activists and others shaped by the anti-war movement to found the MERIP in Washington, DC in 1971 to encourage the New Left to engage with the Middle East through anti-colonial paradigms. MERIP was influenced by Palestinian intellectuals, and was particularly influenced by leftist Lebanese historian Fawwaz Traboulsi's 1969 article in the New Left Review. MERIP distirnguished itself with a regular focus on Palestinians in the Occupied Territories and Israel.

by releasing an irregularly scheduled six-page newsletter called the MERIP Reports. In 1973, the group began releasing the Reports on a scheduled basis. Joe Stork was the long-time editor of the Middle East Report until 1995.

Co-founder Joe Stork was the editor of MERIP's flagship publication Middle East Report until 1995. From 1995 until 2017 the executive director of MERIP and editor in chief of Middle East Report was Chris Toensing. From 2017 until 2019 the executive director was Steve Niva and from 2019 until 2024, the position was held by Mandy Terc. The current executive director is James Ryan.

Since 2022 MERIP has entered into a partnership with the Institute for Arab and Islamic Studies at the University of Exeter whereby Exeter has agreed to house the positions of executive editor and managing editor.

MERIP is partners with the independent publishing house Pluto Press. In a press release, Pluto described their shared interests: "the mission of both organizations is to empower and educate people with alternative viewpoints on such a contested and important area of the world."

== Reception ==
According to The New Arab, MERIP is noted for its left-leaning, "anti-imperialist" writing. Matthew Berkman of Oberlin College notes that academics Geoffrey Levin and Marjorie Feld include MERIP alongside Noam Chomsky and organizations like the Committee on New Alternatives in the Middle East as "Jewish critics of Zionism" that emerged in the mid-1970s.

Israeli government official Mark Regev described MERIP as a "partisan anti-Israel organization".

== Bibliography ==
- Special Focus: MERIP and the Politics of Knowledge Production in MENA Studies, Review of Middle East Studies, Volume 55 – Issue 2 – December 2021
