= Khalaji =

Khalaji (Persian: خلجی) is an Iranian surname. Notable people with the surname include:

- Mehdi Khalaji (born 1973), Iranian-American writer, scholar of Islamic studies, and political analyst
- Mohammad-Taghi Khalaji (born 1948), Iranian Shia cleric
