= Keramati =

Keramati is a surname of Iranian origin. Notable people with the surname include:

- Mahtab Keramati (born 1970), Iranian actress
- Simin Keramati (born 1970), Iranian-born Canadian multidisciplinary artist
