= Masih Alinejad =

Iranian-American journalist, writer and activist (born 1976)

- مسیح علی نژاد
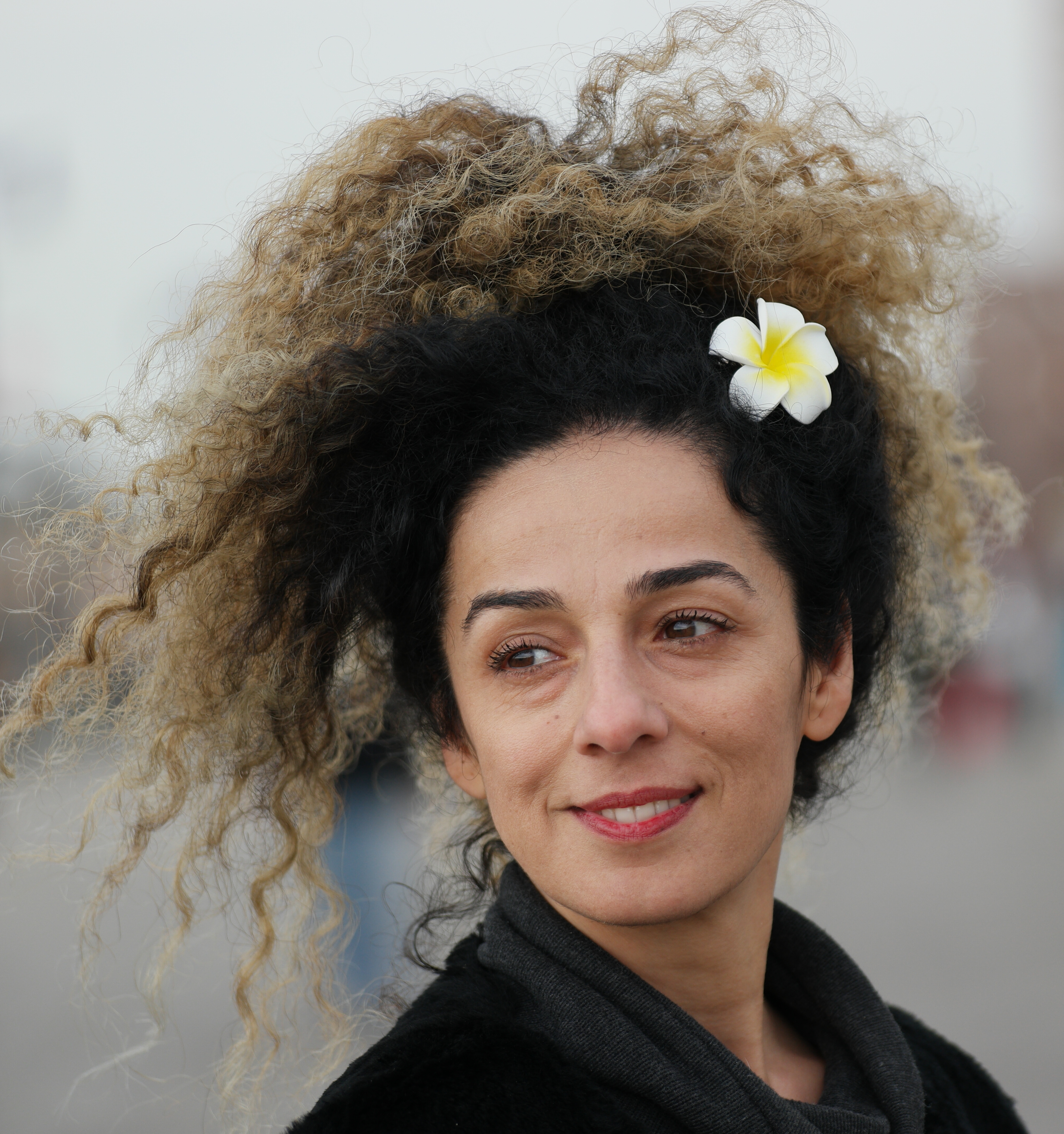
- Alinejad in 2018
- Born: Masoumeh Alinejad-Ghomikolayi; September 11, 1976 (age 50); Qomi Kola, Babol, Imperial State of Iran
- Citizenship: United States
- Education: Oxford Brookes University
- Occupations: Journalist and author
- Years active: 2001–present
- Employer: U.S. Agency for Global Media
- Spouses: Max Lotfi (divorced) Kambiz Forouhar (m. 2014)
- Children: 1

Masoumeh "Masih" Alinejad-Ghomikolayi (Persian: معصومه علی‌نژاد قمی‌کُلایی; born September 11, 1976), is an Iranian-American journalist, author, and political activist. Alinejad worked as a presenter/producer at Voice of America Persian News Network, a correspondent for Radio Farda, a frequent contributor for Manoto television, and a contributing editor for IranWire. Alinejad focuses on criticism of the status of human rights in Iran, especially women's rights. Time magazine named her one of its 2023 Women of the Year honorees.

Alinejad lives in exile in New York City. She has won several awards, including the 2015 Geneva Summit for Human Rights and Democracy women's rights award, the Omid Journalism Award from the Mehdi Semsar Foundation, and a "Highly Commended" AIB Media Excellence Award. She released a memoir in 2018 titled The Wind in My Hair that deals with her experiences growing up in Iran, where she writes girls "are raised to keep their heads low, to be unobtrusive as possible, and to be meek".

According to U.S. prosecutors, she has been the target of a kidnapping plot and multiple assassination plots by the Iranian government. In 2019, Alinejad sued the Iranian government in a U.S. federal court for harassment against her and her family.

== Early life and journalism career in Iran ==
Alinejad was born as Masoumeh Alinejad, but uses the first name "Masih" (Persian for "anointed" or "Messiah").

Alinejad wrote in her memoir that she got her start in journalism with the help of Marjan Sheikholeslami. She began her journalism career in 2001 with the local daily Hambastegi, and then worked for the Iranian Labour News Agency (ILNA). Other publications such as Shargh, Bahar, Vaghaye Ettefaghiye, Ham-Mihan, and Etemad, have also published her work. During the sixth and seventh parliaments, Alinejad was a parliamentary reporter. In 2005, she wrote an article suggesting that while government ministers had claimed they received pay cuts, they were actually receiving considerable sums of money as "bonuses" for everything from serving religious duties to ringing in the New Year. The article generated controversy, and led to her dismissal as a parliamentary reporter.

In 2008, Alinejad wrote a critical piece in Etemad, called "Song of the Dolphins", in which she compared Iranian President Mahmoud Ahmadinejad's followers to hungry dolphins that beg for food. Some supporters of Ahmadinejad expressed their sense of outrage and offense, eventually forcing the director of the newspaper Mehdi Karroubi, himself a relatively popular and very powerful establishment politician and cleric, to publicly apologize.

In the summer of 2009, during her stay in the United States, Alinejad tried to get an interview with Barack Obama; however, her request was refised, although she had been granted a temporary visa on that very basis. When her visa expired, she was forced to return to the United Kingdom. While in the United States, she participated in some Iranian anti-government protests, and delivered a speech in San Francisco, where she said, addressing the authorities of Iran, "We have trembled for thirty years, now it is your turn to tremble." Her interview with Voice of America was shown together with parts of the videos she had made, called "A Storm of Fresh Air". In 2010, she and a group of Iranian writers and intellectuals established the "IranNeda" foundation. After the presidential election in Iran in 2009, she published a novel called A Green Date. Alinejad graduated from Oxford Brookes University with a degree in Communications Studies.

== Career ==
=== Opposition to the Iranian government ===
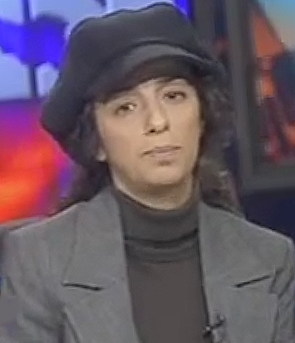
Alinejad just after she left Iran for the United States in 2009

In 2014, Alinejad launched My Stealthy Freedom (also known as Stealthy Freedoms of Iranian Women), a Facebook page that invites Iranian women to post pictures of themselves without a hijab. The page quickly attracted international attention, and garnered hundreds of thousands of likes. In 2015, the Geneva Summit for Human Rights and Democracy awarded her its women's rights prize for "giving a voice to the voiceless and stirring the conscience of humanity to support the struggle of Iranian women for basic human rights, freedom, and equality".

On June 13, 2022, she was awarded the American Jewish Committee's Moral Courage Award for her criticism of the Iranian government and advocacy on behalf of dissidents.

Alinejad has said she is not opposed to the hijab per se, but believes it should be a matter of personal choice. In Iran, women who appear in public without a hijab risk being arrested, imprisoned, and fined.

=== Journalism ===
Masih Alinejad wrote in her book: "Marjan Sheikholeslami, the head of the political department of Hambastegi newspaper agreed to take me under her wing." Since 2015, Alinejad has hosted a weekly 15-minute primetime show called Tablet for Voice of America's Persian Language Service. "With original video from inside Iran, Tablet profiles ordinary citizens and connects them with Americans through short interviews on common themes illustrating both similar and different experiences. The program also has a weekly "timeline report", tracing the development of issues such as the international women's rights movement and relations between Washington and Tehran", the press release states.

In July 2019, Iranian authorities warned the public that anyone sending videos to Alinejad faced up to 10 years in prison. Musa Ghazanfarabadi, the head of Tehran's Revolutionary Court, told Fars News that those sharing protest videos with Alinejad could be imprisoned for up to a decade under laws relating to cooperating with an enemy of the state.

=== Anti-compulsory hijab campaign ===
Alinejad has been critical of Iranian laws making it illegal for women not to wear a hijab outside the home, but also making the broader point that in the current historical and political context – in previous decades it wasn't required or common in Iran and many other Muslim-majority countries – describing it as the most visible symbol of oppression, Journalist Kim Ghattas has described Alinejad as "spearheading" the campaign against the mandatory veil in Iran even from her residence in Brooklyn.

From 2012 to 2019, Alinejad created and promoted multiple campaigns including #WhiteWednesdays, #MyCameraIsMyWeapon, #MyPenIsMyWeapon, #MenWithHijab tomovement against mandatory hijab in Iran.

Some feminists have supported Alinejad's campaign because, in their view, the Islamic veil is the most visible example of women's oppression in Muslim-majority societies. However, postcolonial feminists criticized the campaign for invoking the old "Orientalist cultural imagination" in the West, which was based on stereotypes of oppressed women in the Orient who need to be liberated by adopting Western ideals. Islamic feminists, meanwhile, viewed this effort as bolstering the rising wave of Islamophobia in Europe and the United States, which portrays Islam as a misogynist religion.

Alinejad rejects accusations of Islamophobia while claiming that it is religious laws (Sharia) that scare her; she asserts that religious fanaticism is the primary cause of Islamophobia. Speaking about hijab during a debate with Palestinian-American activist Linda Sarsour on CNN, Alinejad said: "It's important if you care about human rights, women's rights, you cannot use the same tool which is the most visible symbol of oppression in the Middle East and say that this is a sign of resistance [in the United States]."

Following the March 2019 Christchurch mosque shooting in New Zealand, in which 51 people were killed in a terrorist attack driven by white supremacy, Alinejad criticized New Zealand Prime Minister Jacinda Ardern for wearing a hijab in solidarity with, sympathy, and respect to the Muslim victims. She said she "felt that you are using one of the most visible symbols of oppression for Muslim women in many countries for solidarity, and it also broke my heart".

=== Chess championship boycott ===
In 2016, Alinejad launched a boycott campaign against the 2016 women's chess world championship, to be held in February 2017 in Tehran, Iran. The campaign was incited by Nazí Paikidze, a Georgian-American chess player. Paikidze, a non-Iranian, refused to attend world championships in Tehran because, according to Iran's religious law, female players are obligated to wear a hijab. Alinejad supported Paikidze, and co-wrote an op-ed with Indian-American Asra Nomani in The Washington Post.

=== U.S. residence and citizenship ===
Alinejad moved from London to New York City and took up permanent residence in the United States in 2014. She became an American citizen in October 2019.

=== Meeting with U.S. Secretary of State ===
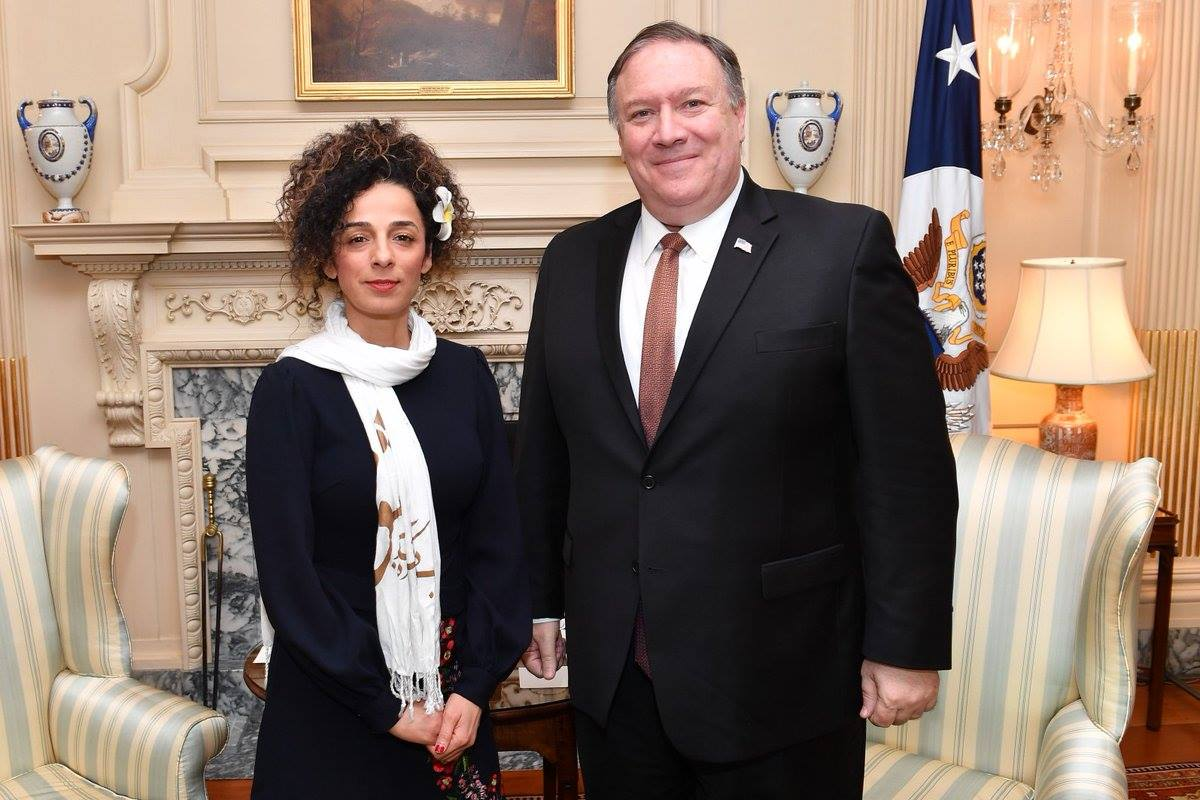
Alinejad with Mike Pompeo, 2019

In February 2019, Masih Alinejad met with U.S. Secretary of State Mike Pompeo. According to Alinejad, the 35-minute meeting covered opposition to the Iranian government, human rights in Iran, and the consequences stemming from the Trump administration's travel ban on students and activists. State Department spokesperson Robert Palladino said that Pompeo thanked Alinejad for her "bravery and continued dedication".

=== Women, Life, Freedom movement ===
During the Mahsa Amini protests, an internet blackout followed by a cyber attack targeted "the Covenant", the movement's initial leader, leaving the protesters without direction. In the aftermath, key Iranian opposition figures outside the country—Reza Pahlavi (the son of the former Shah), soccer player Ali Karimi, dentist Hamed Esmaeilion, and Alinejad—formed a coalition. They amplified their message through media outlets such as BBC and Iran International, assuming leadership of the movement.

On 27 September 2022, Alinejad published an op-ed on The Washington Post criticizing the silence of Western feminists regarding the ongoing protests, that "Western women seem only too happy to succumb to the standards dictated by the male tyrants in countries such as Afghanistan and Iran" despite support for feminist movements in their home countries, such as the 2017 Women's March. Then on 30 September, Alinejad appeared on Real Time with Bill Maher to talk about the ongoing protests. When discussing international support for Iranian women, she remarked that "the first group who came to the streets were women of Afghanistan, can you believe that? The Western feminists who actually went to my country, wore a hijab, and bowed to the Taliban—they didn’t take to the streets." Continuing to speak about Western feminists, she added that "they never go and live under Sharia law, but they don't even let us talk about our own experiences. ... Here they tell me, ‘Shh! If you talk about this, you're going to cause Islamophobia.' Phobia is irrational, but believe me, my fear and the fear of millions of Iranian women and [women] in Afghanistan is rational."

Despite concerns from many, including members of the Covenant, who believed the movement had been "hijacked" or "emotionalized," the protests persisted for several more months before eventually collapsing. A few weeks later, the coalition itself disbanded.

In response to the June 2025 Israeli strikes on Iran, Alinejad stated: "Removing a terrorist is not a tragedy, it is a step toward justice for all the innocent lives they destroyed."

In January 2026, she appeared before the United Nations Security Council as a representative of Iranian civic society in a discussion on the January 2026 Iranian protests. In her remarks, Alinejad paid tribute to those who lost their lives during the state crackdown on protesters and called for a stronger international response, criticizing what she described as "empty condemnation."

== Harassment and threats ==
=== Arrest and harassment of family members ===
On September 23, 2019, Iranian security forces arrested three of Alinejad's family members as retribution for her women's rights activism, according to Amnesty International. Alinejad's brother, Alireza Alinejad-Ghomi, was arrested in Tehran, while Hadi and Leila Lotfi, brother and sister of her former husband, Max Lotfi, were all arrested in the northern city of Babol by officials from the ministry of intelligence. Her parents, siblings, extended family, and all relatives and associates who remained in their village in northern Iran were repeatedly harassed, threatened with loss of employment, and instructed to lure Alinejad to neighboring Turkey for a "family reunion," so that agents could supposedly "just talk" to her. Her brother warned her it was a trap. In 2018, Alinejad's sister and niece were forced to go on a prime-time television programme to say that the family was disgraced by Alinejad's behavior, and that their parents had disowned her. Alinejad responded that her family was forced to say such things by the authorities, a common tactic employed by the Iranian government aimed at discrediting dissidents.

She wrote in a New York Times op-ed published two weeks later: "The truth is that before the show aired, I got a call from my mother – a tiny, illiterate woman who has the toughness that comes from being abandoned at an early age by her own mother and married off at 14 years old. She was sobbing. The intelligence service had tried to pressure her and my father to participate in the show. And the local Friday prayer leader had called them out in public and urged them to cooperate. She refused – a show of loyalty that I can never repay." Also refusing to participate was her brother Alireza, who was imprisoned after intelligence agents raided his home and blindfolded and handcuffed him in front of his two small children, and dragged him away. He was sentenced to eight years. U.S. District Judge G. Michael Harvey concluded Alireza was held hostage until August 2021 and tortured during his detention.

By this point, Iranian authorities had been conducting a concerted smear campaign against Alinejad for a decade, even going to such extremes as doctoring photos to make it look like she engaged in sexually provocative behavior, and showing them to her elderly, poorly educated father. She told The Guardian in 2013 that her father had refused to speak to her for three years as a result. Iranian state-run media ran numerous fabricated stories, such as her being an MI6 agent serving directly under then-Queen Elizabeth II, false quotes attributed to her saying such things as "to be a journalist in Western countries, it is compulsory that you also work for the spy agencies", that she is a drug addict, and that she was a victim of rape on the London subway.

=== Kidnapping plot ===
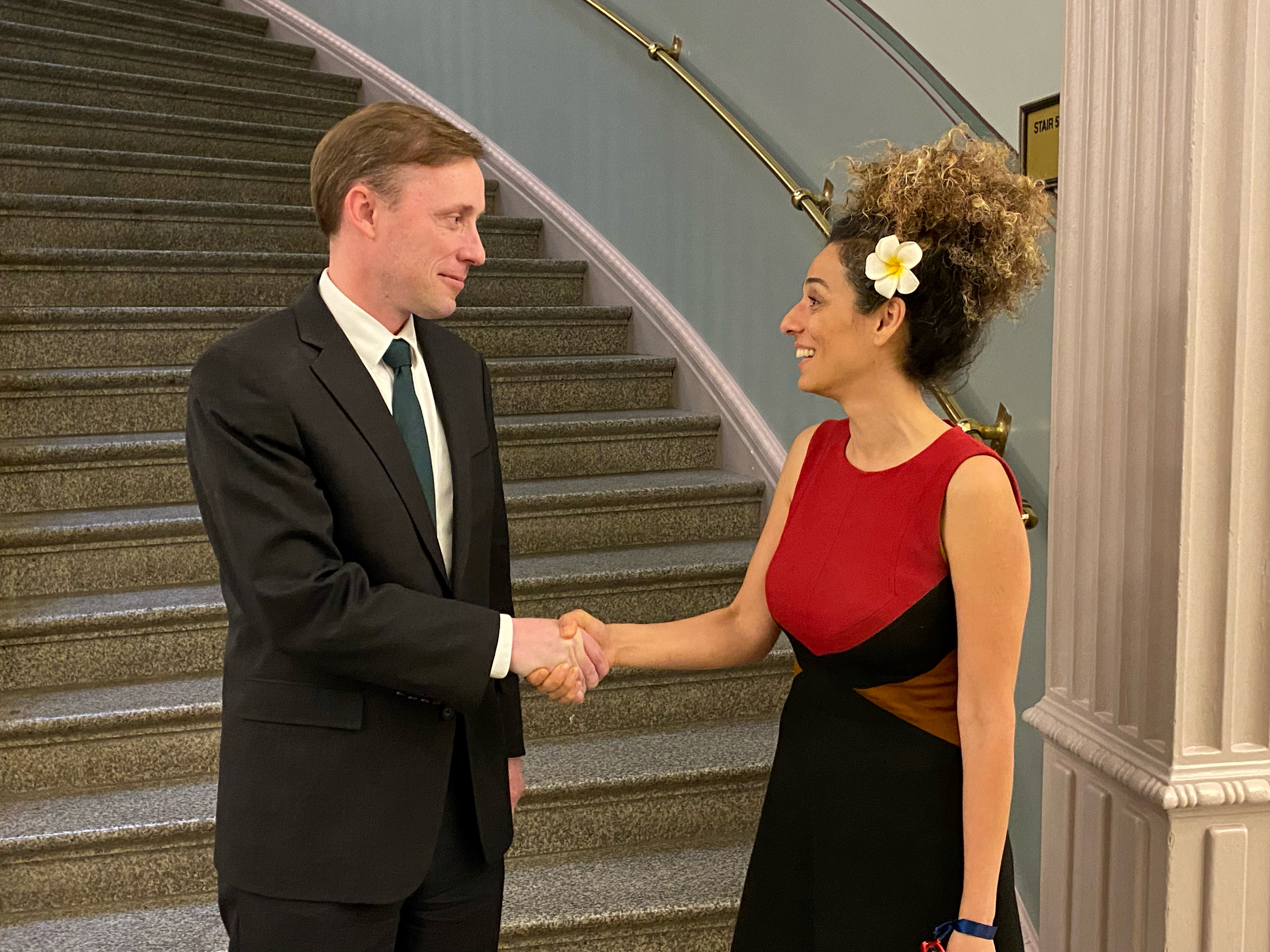
Alinejad meeting with U.S. National Security Advisor Jake Sullivan in July 2021

In July 2021, the U.S. Department of Justice brought charges against four Iranian intelligence officials - Alireza Farahani, Mahmoud Khazein, Kiya Sadeghi and Omid Noori - and their U.S.-based agent, 46-year-old Niloufar Bahadorifar, Irvine, California, for planning to kidnap a New York-based journalist critical of Iran; besides this, was stated that these Iranian intelligence officials planned the same actions for four further people in Canada and the UK. The Iranian kidnapping scheme, which appears to be the first publicized case on U.S. soil, dated back to at least June 2020. Journalist Robin Wright wrote in The New Yorker:

According to the DOJ announcement, the plotters had identified travel routes from Alinejad's home to a Brooklyn waterfront, researched a service offering military-style speedboats for maritime evacuation out of New York, and studied sea travel from New York to Venezuela, which had close ties with the Islamic Republic. In a detailed e-mail, Kiya Sadeghi, another of the four indicted Iranian intelligence agents, even instructed the private investigators to take pictures of the envelopes in Alinejad's mailbox. The FBI stated that it had foiled Iran's scheme in the United States. 'Not on our watch,' William Sweeney, the head of New York's FBI office, said.

Of all the accused, only Bahadorifar was arrested - others are believed to be hiding in Iran - and later she pleaded guilty to conspiring to violate the International Emergency Economic Powers Act and sanctions against the Government of Iran, admitting that she paid money that she received from her Iranian accomplices, to private detectives to spy on Alinejad, knowing that she was doing this to further Iran's goals. On April 7, 2023, Bahadorifar was sentenced to 4 years in prison in the Southern District of New York.

=== Assassination plots ===
On July 28, 2022, 24-year-old Khalid Mehdiyev approached Alinejad's residence in Brooklyn, looking inside the windows and attempting to open the front door. He was stopped later that day by New York City Police during a traffic stop. His license had been suspended and he was arrested for driving without one. The police found a suitcase in his car containing an AK-47 assault rifle with an obliterated serial number. The rifle, manufactured by Norinco, was loaded with a round in the chamber and a magazine attached, along with a second, separate magazine and approximately 66 rounds of ammunition. Mehdiyev, who is from Yonkers, waived his Miranda rights and told police that he was looking for an apartment. Mehdiyev, unprompted, volunteered that he did not know about the gun and claimed the suitcase was not his.

On August 11, 2022, Mehdiyev was indicted on one count of possessing a firearm with an obliterated serial number. In an opinion piece for The Wall Street Journal, Alinejad quoted a special agent of the Federal Bureau of Investigation as saying, "This time their objective was to kill you." On January 27, 2023, the U.S. Department of Justice unsealed an indictment charging Mehdiyev and two men who hired him, 43-year-old Rafat Amirov, Iran, who was arrested in New York, and 38-year-old Polad Omarov, Georgia, who was arrested in the Czech Republic and awaited extradition, in a plot to assassinate Alinejad.

In October 2024, U.S. Department of Justice charged four men from Iran - Ruhollah Bazghandi, Haj Taher, Hossein Sedighi and Seyed Forouzan - and one man from Georgia, Zialat Mamedov, in the same plot to assassinate Alinejad in which Mehdiyev, Amirov and Omarov participated: Bazghandi, a brigadier general of the IRGC, with Taher, Sedighi and Forouzan hired Mamedov, Amirov and Omarov, high-ranking members of an Azerbaijani faction of the Russian mafia, to develop an assassination plan of Alinejad and in the course of developing this plan, Mamedov, Amirov and Omarov hired Mehdiyev to directly carry out the murder. Of the new defendants, only Mamedov was arrested, in the Czech Republic, from where he was extradited to Georgia on unrelated charges; others are believed to be hiding in Iran.

In November 2024, three other men were charged in a separate plot by the Islamic Revolutionary Guard Corps of Iran to kill Alinejad and United States president-elect Donald Trump.

By March 2025, Omarov was extradited to the U.S. and Mehdiyev made a deal with prosecutors, agreeing to testify against his accomplices. In March 20, 2025, Amirov and Omarov were convicted in the Southern District of New York Federal Court of charges relating to the 2022 plot: "murder-for-hire, attempted murder in aid of racketeering, conspiracy, and money laundering". On October 29, they were sentenced to 25 years in prison.

== Recognition ==
=== Awards ===
- AIB Media Excellence Award for Radio Farda's production "Victims of 88", Nov 2013
- Inaugural Women's Rights Award at the Geneva Summit, 2015
- Freethinker Prize by Swiss Freethinkers Association, 2017
- America Abroad Media award, Nov 2019
- Moral Courage Award by American Jewish Committee (AJC), Jun 2022
- Oxi Courage Award for her fight against Iran's compulsory hijab, Oct 2022
- Scholar-Statesman Award by Washington Institute for Near East Policy for her tireless promotion of women's rights, freedom, and political change in her native land, Nov 2022
- Global Impact Award, Dec 2022
- Transatlantic Leadership Network "Freedom of the Media" Gold Medal, 2024

=== Other honors ===
- Nominated for the Nobel Peace Prize for her advocacy for women's rights in Iran, 2022
- Named as one of the 12 Time Magazine Women of the Year, March 2023

== Books ==
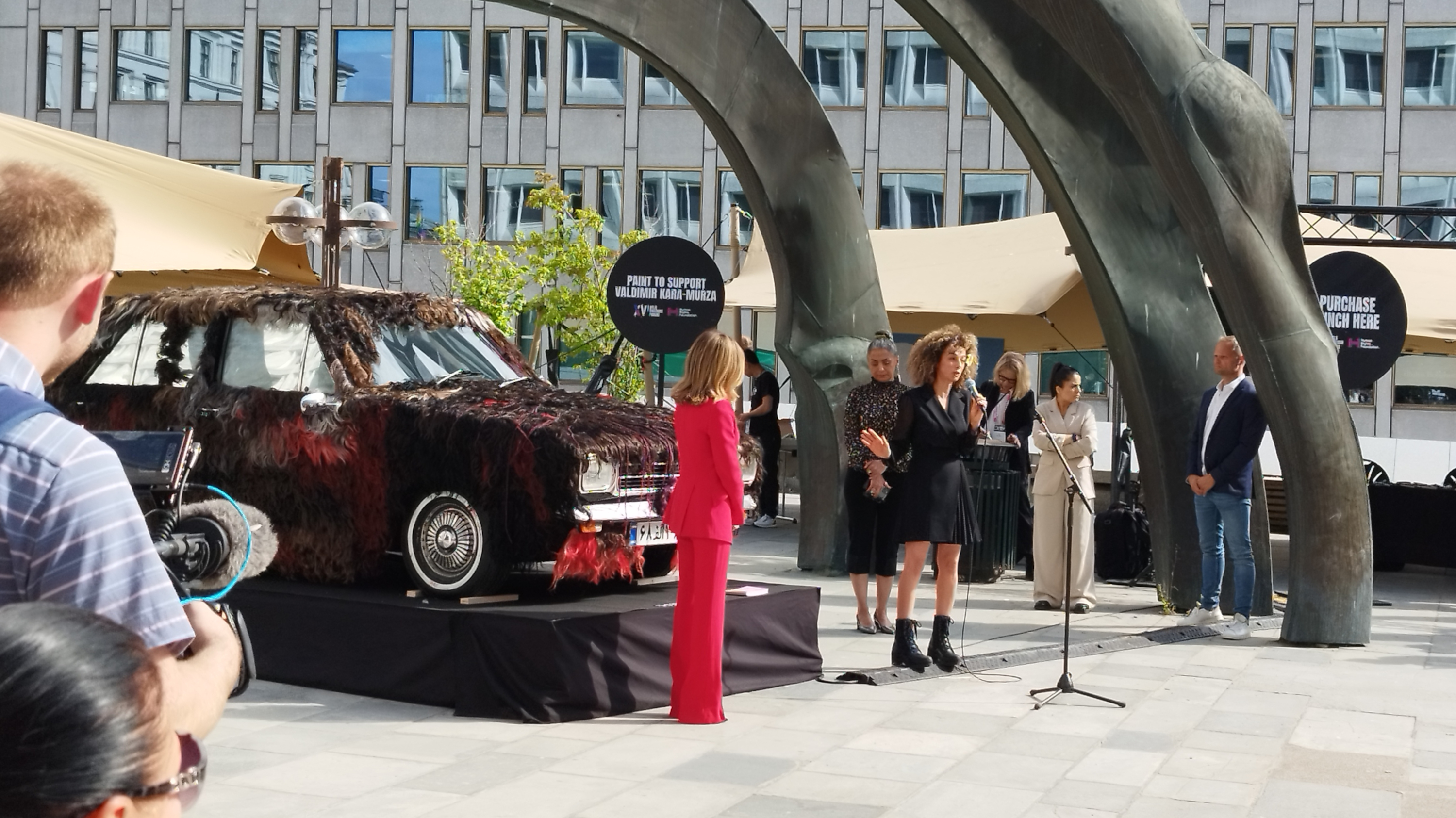
Alinejad speaking at the PaykanArtCar unveiling in Oslo 2023, Simin Keramati is standing to her left

Alinejad's memoir, The Wind in My Hair ISBN 9780349008967, dealing with her journey from a tiny village in northern Iran to becoming a journalist and creating an online movement that sparked a nationwide protest movement, was published by Little Brown in 2018. The New York Times wrote that the book paints a vivid portrait of modern Iran, saying that it was written with a "blunt honesty" that it considered to be a characteristic of Alinejad's life and writing.

She has published four books in Persian:

- Tahasson – which describes the political turmoil/challenges created when the "Sixth Iranian Parliament" went on strike.
- Taj-e-Khar (The Crown of Thorns) – a novel that is now being translated into English. It refers to the passion of the Christ and the crown of thorns placed on his head by the Romans.
- I am Free – which deals with women's issues in Iran, published in Germany because of its being blacklisted by the Ministry of Culture and Islamic Guidance, Iran's censorship body.
- Gharar Sabz (Green Rendezvous) – which deals with post-2009 presidential election fraud violence. This book was also published in Germany, for the same reasons.

== See also ==
- Guardianship of the Islamic Jurist
- Islamic Revolution
- Islamic Revolutionary Court
- Theocracy
- Pouria Zeraati
- List of Iranian women journalists
