= Marjan Sheikholeslami Aleagha =

Iranian journalist and fugitive embezzler

- مرجان شیخ‌الاسلامی آل‌آقا
- Born: 1966 (age 59–60); Kermanshah, Imperial State of Iran
- Citizenship: Iran, Canada
- Occupations: ex-journalist, political activist, embezzler, businesswoman
- Known for: Sepanir Company embezzlement, Petrochemical Commercial Company corruption, Embezzlement of $7.4 billion (€6.6 billion)
- Spouse(s): Mehdi Khalaji (div.); Majid Baghernejad

Marjan Sheikholeslami Aleagha (Persian: مرجان شیخ‌الاسلامی آل‌آقا) is a former journalist, political activist, businesswoman and fugitive embezzler. She is married to Mehdi Khalaji, an advocate of economic sanctions against Iran. Marjan Aleagha is known for embezzling $7.4 billion in one of her cases.

== Media activities ==
She started as a journalist in reformist newspapers in late 1990s, including covering the parliament at Hambastegi newspaper. Later in mid 2000s she directed a news agency linked to Cultural Heritage, Handicrafts and Tourism Organization of Iran, which was headed by Hamid Baghaei, a Vice President and confidant to President Ahmadinejad. Masih Alinejad wrote in her book: "Marjan Sheikholeslami, the head of the political department of Hambastegi newspaper agreed to take me under her wing."

== Political involvement ==
As a member of the main reformist party, Islamic Iran Participation Front, she ran an unsuccessful campaign for a seat in Tehran in 1996 Iranian legislative election. In 2008, she switched sides and was endorsed by allies of the President Mahmoud Ahmadinejad for the 2008 Iranian legislative election to no avail.

In 2014, she cofounded Idea Center for Arts and Culture LLC with her husband Mehdi Khalaji and published a web magazine, Ghalamro. The company was dissolved in 2017.

== Corruption charges ==
In two separate cases, she is accused of embezzling public funds in Iran. In 2010, as the international sanctions against Iran intensified, she founded various companies in Iran and Turkey to help Iran bypass the sanctions and sell its petrochemical products. In March 2019, Marjan Sheikholeslami Aleagha was formally accused of being involved in a giant embezzlement court case of a value of 6.6 billion EU of the assets of Iran National Petrochemical Company while attempting to bypass Iran sanctions. Marjan Sheikholeslami Aleagha fled Iran in and took asylum in Canada.

According to Radio Free Europe/Radio Liberty, Sheikholeslami is accused of working closely with Reza Hamzehlou, the then CEO of Iran's Petrochemical Commercial Company which was just privatised by Ahmadinejad's government, to embezzle €6.6b of petrochemical exports under the sanctions. The case is described by Shargh newspaper as the biggest corruption case in Iranian history. She is charged with €7,065,529 in one case and $8,710,384 embezzlement in another by an ongoing trial in Tehran.

In another case, Sheikholeslami is accused of receiving funds from Sepanir Oil and Gas Energy Engineering Company, which is owned by Islamic Revolutionary Guard Corps, to import goods which she never delivered and escaped Iran to Canada. The amount is not disclosed yet.

== Personal life ==
While being in a political and journalism and trading career in Iran, Sheikholeslami Aleagha changed her lifestyles drastically from wearing Chador, a conservative veil or Hijab type, to being unveiled while pictured abroad after fleeing from Iran. She also got divorced and remarried, latest with Mehdi Khalaji. In her current life she is a "helping hand to Iranian government in sanctions bypass' but also married to a right-wing political activist vehemently in favor of sanctions against Iran. This contradiction has attracted a lot of attention in Persian language media, describing the couple as 'one makes sanctions and the other, bypasses them."

== See also ==
- Khatam al-Anbiya Construction Headquarters
- Corruption in Iran
