= Rethinking Islam =

Book by Mohammed Arkoun

Rethinking Islam: Common Questions, Uncommon Answers
- Author: Mohammed Arkoun
- Translator: Robert D. Lee
- Language: English
- Subject: Islamic philosophy
- Publisher: Westview Press
- Publication date: 1994
- Publication place: United States
- Pages: 139
- ISBN: 9780813384740

Rethinking Islam: Common Questions, Uncommon Answers is a book on Islamic philosophy by Algerian scholar Mohammed Arkoun, published in 1994. Arkoun's book has been cited in a number of scholarly sources for providing a contemporary understanding of the development of Islamic philosophy and its effects in the Muslim world.

Rethinking Islam discusses a range of topics including the various ways in which Islamic ideas have been interpreted over time and the perspective of developments in Islamic countries from their own point of view. A New York Times review called the book "an illustration of the contemporary fecundity of Islam" and called Arkoun "the leading French-language spokesman calling for a rethinking of Islam in a modern mode."

== Content ==
=== Thought and meaning ===
In his work, Arkoun writes on the subject of thought and meaning. He declared there are three categories of thought. He labels these categories as 'thinkable', 'unthinkable' and 'unthought'. Arkoun taught that meaning is generated by semantic creativity, the inventiveness of a subject especially while under the pressure of new and unfamiliar existential demands that necessitate destroying, transforming, or surpassing previous meanings.

=== Human rights in Islamic society ===
Arkoun was of the view that Islamic thought had always included a discourse on the rights of God (either public or collective rights) and the rights of man (essentially individual rights), with the former having priority over the latter.

=== Islamic philosophical and political development ===
In Rethinking Islam, Arkoun argues for a concise understanding Islamic development in modern times and attempts to deconstruct the popular western misrepresentations. He argues: "Islamic culture, in fact, is not reducible to the stereotypes articulated by the Christian religion and European cultures ever since the thirteenth century." Arkoun argues that "Mediterranean thinking" is always multiple and open, always engaged in exchange, negotiation, and dialogue between "influences and residues".

According to Arkoun, public discussion of secular aspects embedded within a religious understanding of the universal concept of human rights was not the prime factor bringing Islamic countries in recent years to a "compromise position". Arkoun suggested that scholars studying the intellectual development of Islam today need to see beyond the imposed restrictions in many Middle Eastern countries on various kinds of knowledge in journalism, political studies and deviant Islamist ideologies.

=== Interpretation of Islamic texts ===
Arkoun admits that many fundamental changes occur in the constant interpretation of Islamic texts. He states that it is especially true of the Qur'an, which "has been ripped from its historical, linguistic, literary, and psychological contexts and then been continually recontextualized in various cultures and according to the ideological needs of various actors."

Fundamentalist and politically inspired Islamic movements tend to reaffirm in their own theological discourse by casting their ideology in an orientalist imaging of Islam.

== See also ==
- Islamic philosophy
