= Mohammed Arkoun =

Algerian scholar and thinker (1928–2010)

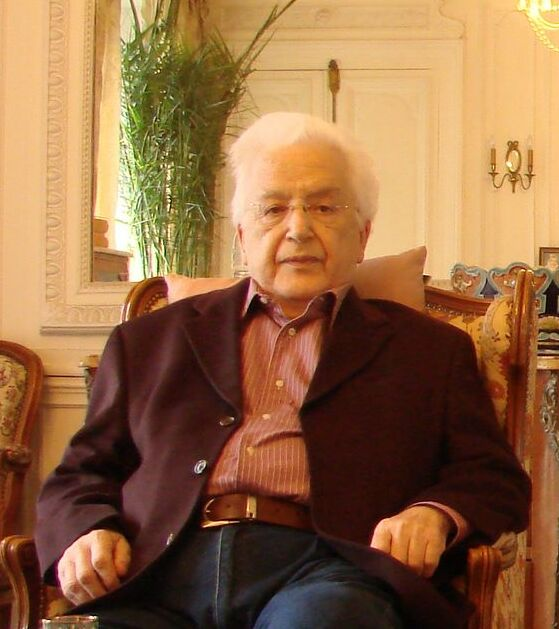
- Arkoun in 2008
- Born: February 1, 1928; Taourirt Mimoun, French Algeria
- Died: September 14, 2010 (aged 82); Paris, France

Philosophical work
- Era: 20th-century philosophy
- Region: Islamic philosophy

Mohammed Arkoun (Arabic: محمد أركون, Kabyle: Muḥemmed Arkun; 1 February 1928 – 14 September 2010) was an Algerian/French scholar and thinker. He was considered to have been one of the most influential secular scholars in Islamic studies contributing to contemporary intellectual Islamic reform. In a career of more than 30 years, he had been a critic of the tensions embedded in his field of study, advocating Islamic modernism, secularism, and humanism. During his academic career, he wrote his numerous books mostly in French, and occasionally in English and Arabic.

== Academic career ==
Arkoun was born in 1928 in Taourirt Mimoun, a village in Kabylia in northern Algeria. His family was traditional, religious and relatively poor. His father was a shopkeeper in Ain al-Arba'a, a wealthy French settlement in east of Oran. He attended primary school in his Berber-speaking home village until he was nine-years-old. As the eldest son, he was expected to learn his father's trade, while continuing to attend primary school. He studied at the Faculty of Literature of the university of Algiers and at the Sorbonne in Paris (agrégé in Arabic language and Literature, 1956 and Ph.D., 1968). He established his academic reputation with his studies of the history and philosophy of Ibn Miskawayh. As he began to consider how one might rethink Islam in the contemporary world, his questioning provided a counterpoint to the predominant interpretations of both the Muslim world and the non-Muslim West. As the editor of Arabica, he broadened the journal's scope, and played a significant role in shaping Western-language scholarship on Islam. He authored numerous books in French, English, and Arabic, including: Rethinking Islam (Boulder, Colorado, 1994), L'immigration: défis et richesses (Paris, 1998) and The Unthought in Contemporary Islamic Thought (London, 2002). His shorter studies appeared in many academic journals; his works have been translated into several languages.

He was decorated as a Commander of the French Legion of Honor in 2004, before that a Chevalier and Officer in 1984 and 1996, respectively. In 2001, Arkoun was asked to deliver the Gifford Lectures, which enable a notable scholar to contribute to the advancement of theological and philosophical thought.

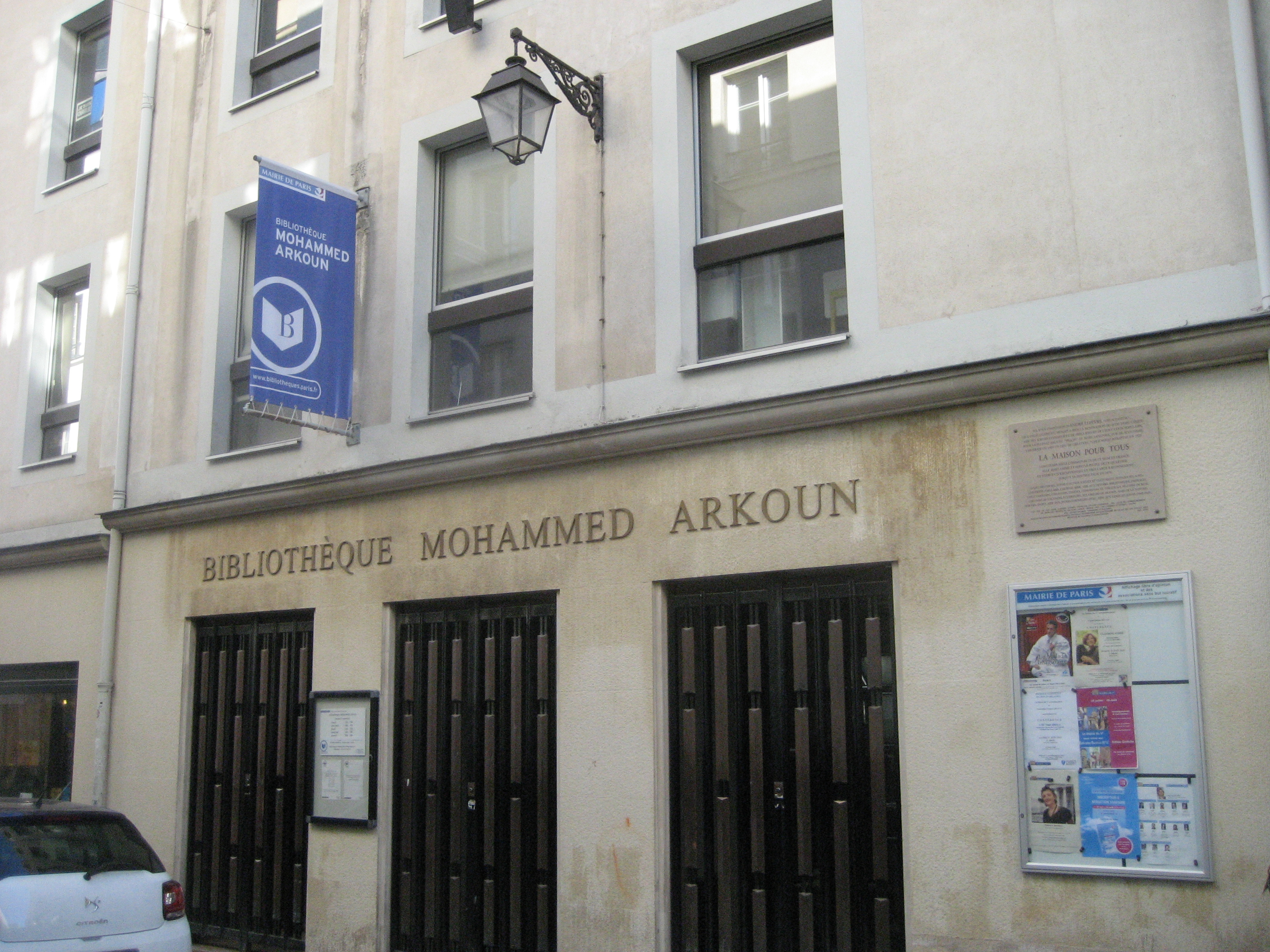
Mohammed Arkoun Library, Paris

Arkoun taught at the Lyon 2 University (1969–1972), as a professor, and at the Paris 8 University, and at the New Sorbonne University of Paris (1972–1992). He was a Fellow at Wissenschaftskolleg in Berlin (1986–1987 and 1990) and at the Institute for Advanced Study in Princeton, New Jersey, U.S.A (1992–1993), visiting professor at University of California, Los Angeles (1969), Princeton University (1985), Temple University, the University of Louvain-la-Neuve, Wallonia, Belgium, (1977–1979), the Pontifical Institute of Arabic Studies in Rome and the University of Amsterdam (1991–1993) and served as a jury member for the Aga Khan Award for Architecture. At the time of his death he was Emeritus Professor at La Sorbonne as well as Senior Research Fellow and member of the Board of Governors of The Institute of Ismaili Studies (IIS), At IIS, he has taught various graduate courses including unthought in contemporary Islamic thought, rethinking Islam, contemporary challenges of Muslim world and traditions for almost a decade. He appeared on numerous occasions on French TV and magazines, on Berbère Télévision speaking in Kabyle, his mother tongue, and on Al Jazeera speaking in Arabic.

Arkoun died on the evening of September 14, 2010, in Paris.

== Thought ==
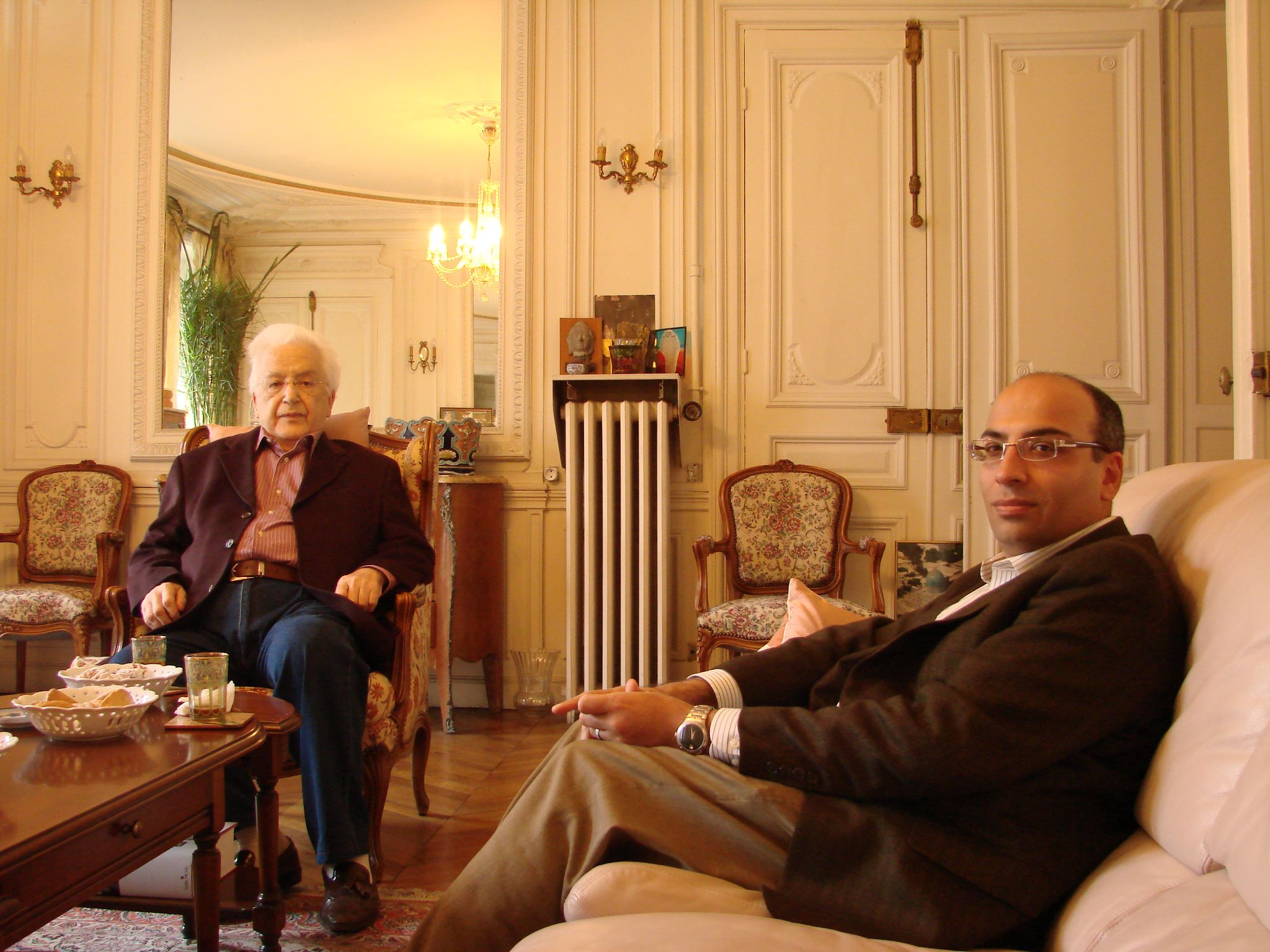
Mohamed Arkoun with Mehdi Khalaji (Paris, 2008).

Arkoun advocated a radical paradigm shift that would allow for the rethinking of Islam as a cultural and religious system and subvert ideological and dogmatic constructs with hegemonic claims. He was committed to contribute to an archaeology of the hidden, repressed, and marginalised elements of Islam, in order to uncover, and set free, what he called, 'the exhaustive tradition' of Islam. Most of his work was written in French rather than Arabic. In order to counteract the philological and historical bias of traditional Islamic studies, he advocated what he called “applied Islamology”—following Roger Bastide's concept of “applied anthropology.” Applied Islamology aims to establish a “disciplinary space between political and historical sciences” (Arkoun, The answers, 25), taking into consideration elements of the courte and longue durée, as well as contemporary social factors. Arkoun developed an inclusive approach which seeks to deal with Islamic tradition in its entirety, including elements characterised by the religious leaders as heterodox, and therefore marginalised and repressed. He has adopted a multifaceted and holistic approach which looks between traditional dogma and axioms.

== Main publications ==
=== In English ===
1. Arab Thought, ed. S.Chand, New Delhi, 1988.
2. Rethinking Islam : Common questions, Uncommon answers, today, Westview Press, Boulder, 1994.
3. The concept of revelation : from the people of the book to the societies of the book, Claremont Graduate University, Claremont, California, 1988.
4. The Unthought in Contemporary Islamic Thought, London, 2002.
5. Islam: To Reform or to Subvert, Saqi Books, London, 2006.

=== In French ===
1. Deux Epîtres de Miskawayh, édition critique, ed. B.E.O, Damas, 1961.
2. Aspects de la pensée islamique classique, ed. IPN, Paris, 1963.
3. L'humanisme arabe au 4e/10e siècle, ed. Vrin, Paris, 1973.
4. Traité d'Ethique, Trad., introd., notes du Tahdhîb al-akhlâq de Miskawayh, 1e éd.1969 (2e éd.1988).
5. Essais sur la pensée islamique, 1e ed. Maisonneuve & Larose, Paris, 1973 (2e éd. 1984).
6. La Pensée arabe, 1e éd. P.U.F., Paris, 1975 (6e éd. 2002).
7. L'Islam, hier, demain, (with Louis Gardet), 2e ed. Buchet-Chastel, Paris, 1982 (translation in Arabic, Beyrouth 1983).
8. L'Islam, religion et société, ed. Cerf, Paris, 1982 (translated in Italia, RAI 1980).
9. Lectures du Coran, 1e ed. Albin Michel, Paris, 1982 (2e Aleef, Tunis 1991).
10. Pour une critique de la Raison islamique, Paris, 1984.
11. L'Islam, morale et politique, UNESCO-Desclée, Paris, 1986.
12. Religion et laïcité: Une approche laïque de l'Islam, ed. L'Arbrelle, Paris, 1989.
13. Ouvertures sur l'Islam, 1e ed. J. Grancher, Paris, 1989.
14. L'Islam, approche critique, Paris, 1989.
15. Ouvertures sur l'islam, Paris, 1992.
16. L´Islam et les musulmans dans le monde, Paris, 1993.
17. Penser l'islam aujourd'hui, Alger, 1993.
18. L’Islam. Approche critique, Le livre du mois, Paris, 2002.
19. Combats pour l’Humanisme en contextes islamiques, Paris, 2002.
20. De Manhattan à Bagdad: Au-delà du Bien et du Mal, Paris, 2003.
21. ABC de l'islam, Paris, 2007.
22. La question éthique et juridique dans la pensée islamique, Paris, 2010.
23. La Construction humaine de l'islam, Paris, 2012.
24. Quand l’islam s’éveillera, Paris, 2018.

=== In Arabic ===
1. Al-Fikr al-'arabiyy (الفكر العربي), ed. Uwaydat, Beyrouth 1979.
2. Al-Islâm: Asâla wa Mumârasa (الإسلام : أصالة و ممارسة), ed. Latakia, Damascus, 1986.
3. Ta'rîkhiyyat al-fikr al-'arabiyy al-islâmiyy (تاريخية الفكر العربي الإسلامي أو "نقد العقل الإسلامي"), ed. Markaz al-inmâ' al-qawmiyy, Beyrouth 1986.
4. Al-Fikr al-islâmiyy: Qirâ'a 'ilmiyya (الفكر الإسلامي : قراءة علمية), ed. Arab cultural center, Beyrouth 1987.
5. Al-islâm: al-Akhlâq wal-Siyâsa (الإسلام : الأخلاق و السياسة), ed. Arab Printing, Publishing and Distribution center, Cairo, 1988.
6. Al-fikr al-islâmi: Naqd wa-jtihâd (الفكر الإسلامي : نقد و اجتهاد), ed. Dâr al-Sâqî, London, 1990.
7. Al-'almana wa-l-dîn (العلمنة و الدين : الإسلام، المسيحية، الغرب), ed. Dâr al-Sâqî, London, 1990.
8. Mina-l-ijtihâd ilâ naqd al-'aql al-islâmî (من الاجتهاد إلى نقد العقل الإسلامي), ed. Dâr al-Sâqî, London, 1991.
9. Min Faysal al-Tafriqa ilâ Fasl-al-Maqâl: Ayna huwa-l-Fikr al-islâmiyy al-mu‘âsir (من فيصل التفرقة إلى فصل المقال : أين هو الفكر الإسلامي المعاصر؟), ed. Dâr al-Sâqî, London, 1993.
10. Al-Islâm, Urubbâ, wal-Gharb: Rihânât al-ma'nâ wa Irâdât al-Haymana (الإسلام، أوروبا، الغرب : رهانات المعنى و إرادات الهيمنة), ed. Dâr al-Sâqî, London, 1995.
11. Naz‘at al-Ansana fî-l-fikr al-‘arabiyy (نزعة الأنسنة في الفكر العربي), ed. Dâr al-Sâqî, London, 1997.
12. Qadâyâ fî Naqd al-Fikr al-dînî (قضية نقد الفكر الديني), ed. Dâr al-Talî‘a, Beyrouth 1998.
13. Al-Fikr al-usûlî wal-stihâlat al-Ta’sîl (الفكر الأصولي و استحالة التأصيل : نحو تاريخ آخر للفكر الإسلامي), ed. Dâr al-Sâqî, London, 1999.
14. Ma‘ârik min ajli-l-ansana fî-l-siyâqât al-islâmiyya (معارك من أجل الأنسنة في السياق الإسلامي), ed. Dâr al-sâqî, London, 2001.
15. The Qur'an : Min al-Tafsîr al-mawrûth ilâ tahlîl al-khitâb al-dînî (القرآن : من التفسير الموروث إلى تحليل الخطاب الديني), ed. Dâr al-Talî‘a, Beyrouth 2001.
16. The Qur'an from the inherited interpretation to the analysis of religious discourse (القرآن من التفسير الموروث إلى تحليل الخطاب الديني), ed. Dâr al-Talî‘a, Beyrouth 2001.

=== In Dutch ===
1. Islam in Discussie, 24 vragen over de Islam, éd. Uitgeverij Contact, Amsterdam 1993.
2. Islam & De Democratie; Een ontmoeting, en collaboration avec Frits Bolkestein, Uitgeverij Contact, Amsterdam 1994.
3. Several articles and interviews in Dutch Journals.

=== In Indonesian ===
1. Nalar Islami dan nalar modern: Berbagai Tantangan dan Jalan Baru, Trans. Johan H. Meuleman, INIS, Jakarta 1994.
2. Berbagai Pembacaan Quran, Trans. Machasin, ed. Johan H. Meuleman, INIS, Jakarta 1997, 256 p.
3. Kajian Kontemporer al-Qur'an, Trans. Hidayatullah, Pustaka, Bandung, 1998, 265 p.
4. Membedah Pemikiran Islam, Trans. Hidayatullah, Pustaka, Bandung, 2000

== Honours and awards ==
=== Honours ===
- Commandeur of the Legion of Honour (France).
- Officier of the Ordre des Palmes Académiques (France).

=== Awards ===
- Giorgio Levi Della Vida Award (London, 2002).
- The Ibn Rushd Prize for Freedom of Thought (Berlin, 2003).
- Prize for culture (Doha, 2010).
- International Prize of Acharif Al Idrissi (Palermo, 2012 - posthumously).
- Prize Izerfan (Rabat, 2012 - posthumously).
- Trophy for the promotion of human rights (Rabat, 2012 - posthumously).

=== Acknowledgement ===
- Member of the European Academy of Sciences and Arts.
- Member of the Academy of the Kingdom of Morocco.

=== Honorary degrees ===
- University of Exeter, Doctor of Letters (DLitt) 2001.
