= PaykanArtCar =

US-based non-profit organization and art project

Logo

PaykanArtCar is a non-profit organization and art project, based in the US. It is focused on human rights issues in Iran.

== The car ==
The non-profit organization, based in Florida, has purchased a car, now also called the PaykanArtCar, and intends to let different Iranian activist artists work on it as an art project, meant to highlight various political issues and repressed communities in Iran. The car is an Iranian Paykan, gifted in 1974 by Shah Mohammad Reza Pahlavi of Iran to Nicolae Ceaușescu, dictator of Romania. It was bought at an auction in 2021 for €95 000.

== 2021 ==
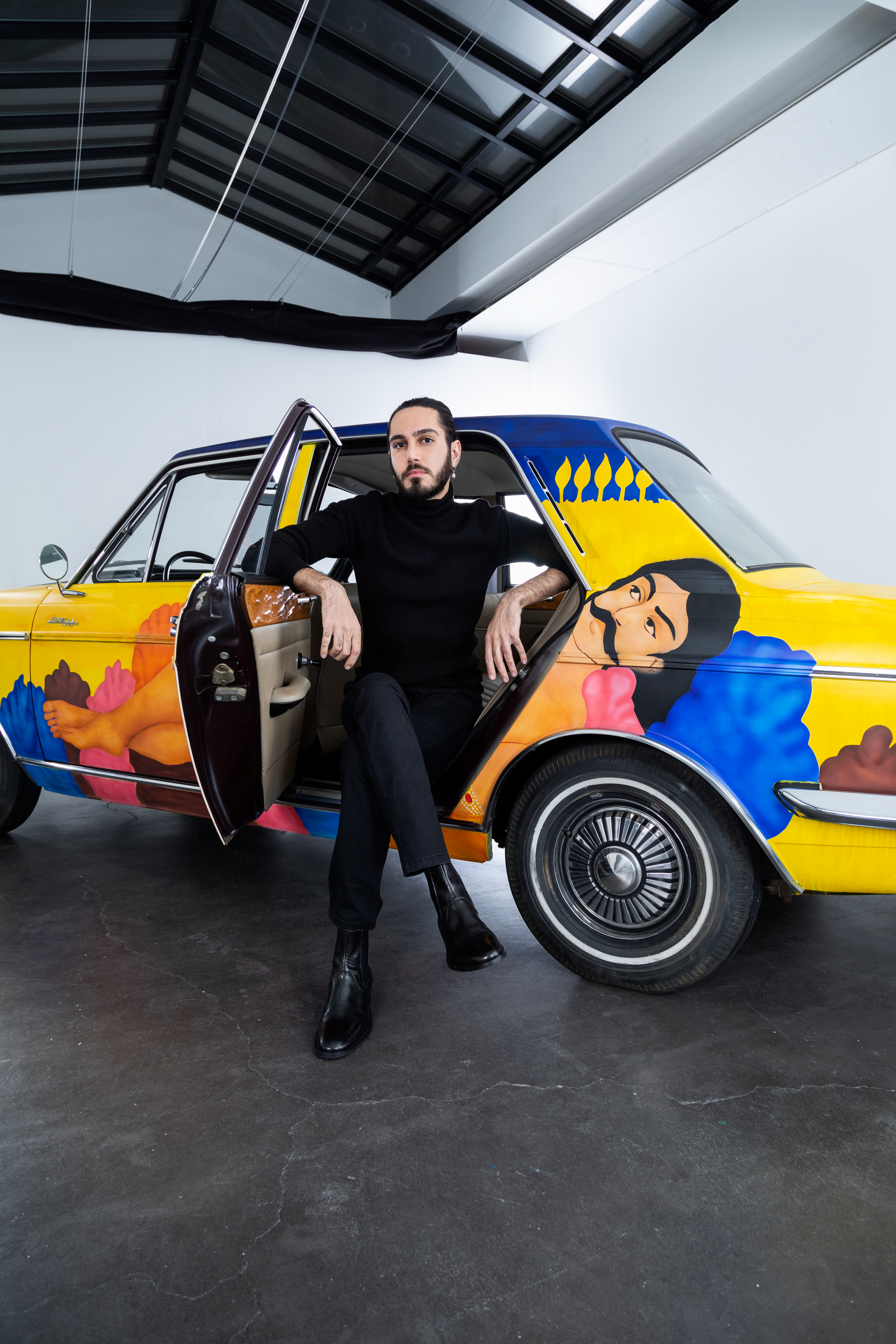
Alireza Shojaian with the 2021 PaykanArtCar

The art car was first exhibited in October 2021 at the Oslo Freedom Forum in Miami, held by the Human Rights Foundation (HRF). The first artist to paint the car was Alireza Shojaian, an exiled Iranian. Shojaian, working with an airbrush for the first time, took inspiration from the story of Rostam, a legendary Persian hero, the art of 20th century Iranian artist Hossein Qollar-Aqasi, and connected them to the 2021 murder of the gay Iranian Ali Fazeli Monfared, as well as the executed Iranian wrestler Navid Afkari. Shojaian said

The aim of this edition of the PaykanArtCar is to shed light on the deadly abuse of LGBTQIA+ people in Iran, a problem that has been repeatedly denied by the regime and neglected by Iranian society, including in the diaspora.

The organization received the Václav Havel Prize for Creative Dissent from the HRF, who said that the car was "a daring piece of art that advocates for human rights and dignity in Iran."

The car has been exhibited in Canada and Brussels, Belgium. It was meant to be shown at AsiaNow, an art fair in Paris, but the invitation was revoked. A representative of AsiaNow stated that

The problem is neither the artist nor the project, but the organization supporting this project, which uses the L.G.B.T.Q.+ cause for priority reasons that are other than purely artistic, and which endanger the safety of the people working with us on our Iranian platform."

== 2023 ==
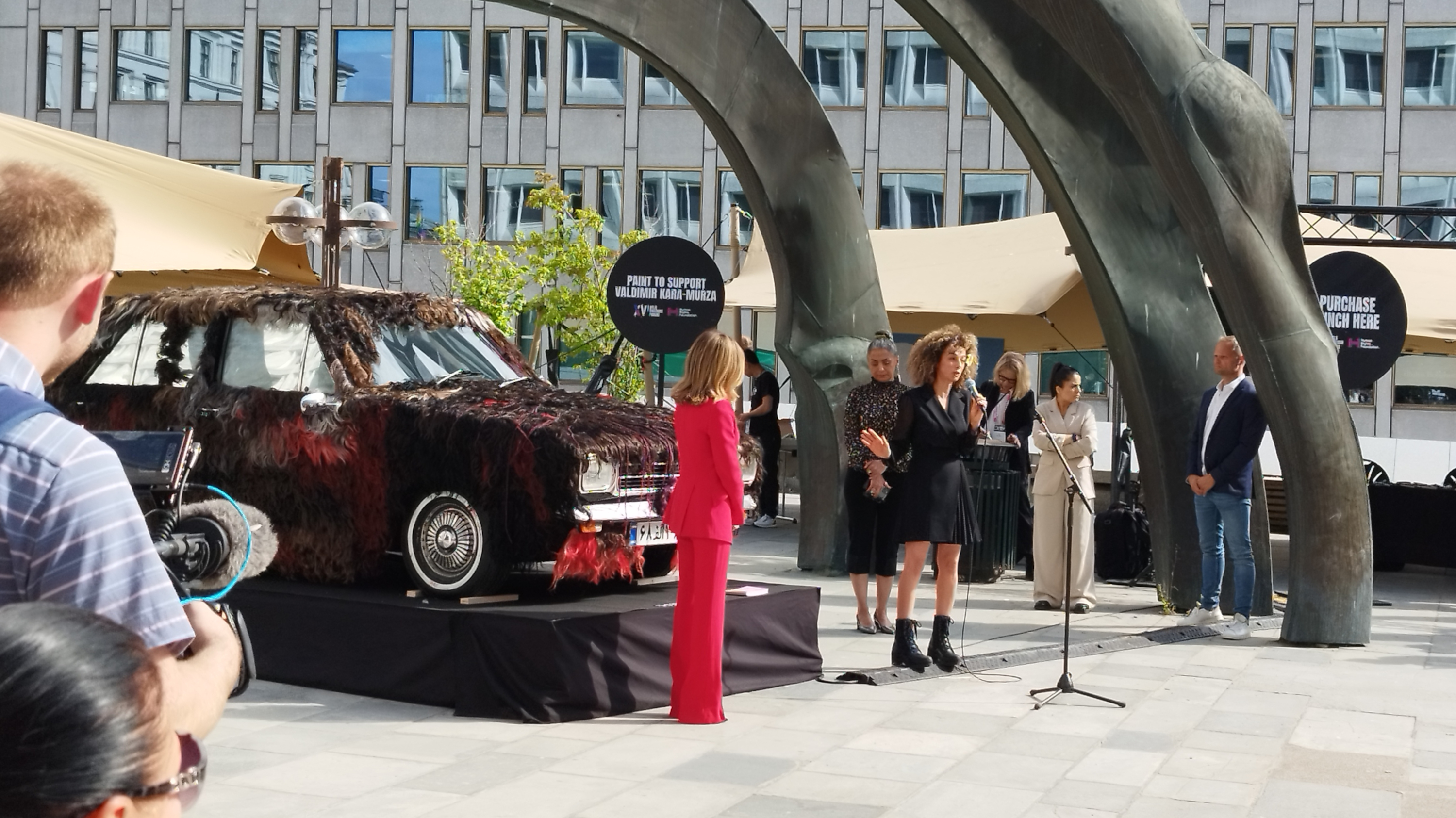
Masih Alinejad speaking at the PaykanArtCar unveiling in Oslo 2023, Simin Keramati is standing to her left

The second installment of the PaykanArtCar was first shown in Oslo, Norway, outside the Oslo Concert Hall, in June 2023. This installment was created by Simin Keramati, Iranian-Canadian artist. She covered the car with women's hair, with the intent that the art project shall raise awareness of the struggle of Iranian women, as well as pay tribute to the death of Mahsa Amini and the following Mahsa Amini protests. Keramati said

The Paykan car itself, the canvas for this installation, is a typically masculine element in Iranian society. Covering this classic national car with natural women’s hair, I appropriate this figure as a female body.

Women's rights activist Masih Alinejad, present at the unveiling, said

We are here to say that all this hair symbolizes the brutality of this gender apartheid regime. ... I ask Norwegian women to touch and feel this hair. Think you could be killed for this. Just a little hair can get you killed in 21st century Iran.

== People ==
PaykanArtCar was founded by Mark Wallace, American ambassador to the United Nations 2006–2009, and Hiva Feizi, the organization's executive director.

== See also ==
- BMW Art Car, another car related art project
- LGBT rights in Iran
