= Ruhollah Bazghandi =

Iranian general

Ruhollah Bazghandi is an Iranian brigadier general. He is a senior member of the Islamic Revolutionary Guard Corps. He is a former chief of the corps' counterintelligence department. In October 2024, he was charged, along with six other Iranian operatives, as part of an alleged plot to kill the New York-based Iranian journalist Masih Alinejad.

== Key roles and activities ==
=== Counterintelligence leadership ===
Bazghandi has served as a counterintelligence official within the IRGC-IO, where he has been involved in detaining foreign prisoners in Iran and conducting counterespionage operations.

=== Assassination plots ===
Bazghandi has played a central role in assassination schemes targeting journalists, dissidents, Israeli citizens, and others deemed adversaries of Iran. Notably, he was charged by the U.S. in connection with a plot to assassinate Masih Alinejad, an Iranian-American journalist and human rights activist living in exile in New York City.

The plot involved hiring members of an Eastern European criminal organization to carry out the assassination.

Operations in Syria

Bazghandi has been linked to IRGC-IO operations in Syria, which include counterespionage and supporting Iranian military objectives in the region.

Sanctions and legal actions

Bazghandi has been sanctioned by the U.S. Department of the Treasury under Executive Order 14078 for his involvement in wrongful detentions and assassination plots. These sanctions block his property and interests in property within U.S. jurisdiction.

In October 2024, he was indicted by U.S. authorities for his role in the attempted murder-for-hire plot against Alinejad.

== See also ==
- Islamic Revolutionary Guard Corps
- Masih Alinejad
- Unit 910
