= Mohammad-Taghi Khalaji =

Iranian Shia cleric (born 1948)

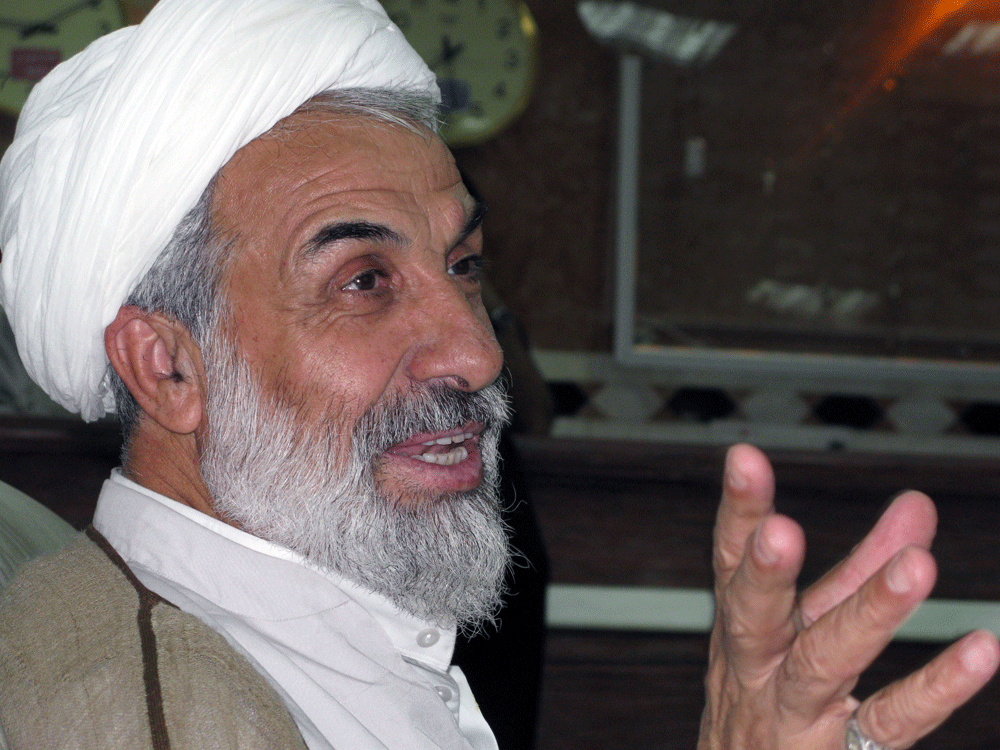
Sheikh Mohammad Taghi Khalaji

Mohammad-Taghi Khalaji (Persian: محمدتقی خلجی; born March 31, 1948) is an Iranian Shia cleric. He has been described as "a prominent Qom cleric close to reformist clerics Ayatollah Hussein-Ali Montazeri and Ayatollah Yousef Sane'i." He was arrested on January 13, 2010, taken to Evin Prison in Tehran and as of January 26 was being held "without charge in solitary confinement, without access to a lawyer or family visits."

== Overview ==
Khalaji was the son of a farmer in the province of Isfahan and came from "a conservative religious background." When he was 5 years old, he moved to Tehran, where his three brothers lived. In 1968, after graduating from high school and then Shokooh English Language Institute, he started to work as a bank accountant. In 1969, under the influence of the rising religious fervor in Iran, he left "his job in the bank and its good salary" and moved to Qom with his fiancée Mohtaram, to begin study in a seminary, becoming the first in his family to be a cleric. In Qom he joined the pro-Khomeini clique and became a disciple of Ayatollah Morteza Motahhari Before the 1979 Islamic Revolution he was arrested and imprisoned by the Shah's regime three times as a political activist, being released for the last time in February 1979 after the Shah had been toppled.

His 2010 arrest was by four agents of intelligence ministry and could now face trial in the Special Court for the Clergy. Books, letters, a computer and his family's passports were also confiscated.

It is thought that his arrest may be connected to his plans to visit his son, Mehdi Khalaji, in the United States, and his son's work with BBC Radio and Radio Farda followed by his employment by the Washington Institute for Near East Policy, all organizations "which the Ministry of Intelligence has claimed are involved in a `soft war` to overthrow the Islamic Republic," and banned all Iranians from collaborating with. Another source credits his arrest to "several speeches critical of the authorities" including their "use of violence against peaceful protestors".
