= Mehdi Khalaji =

Iranian-American writer (born 1973)

Mohammadmehdi Khalaji
- مهدی خلجی
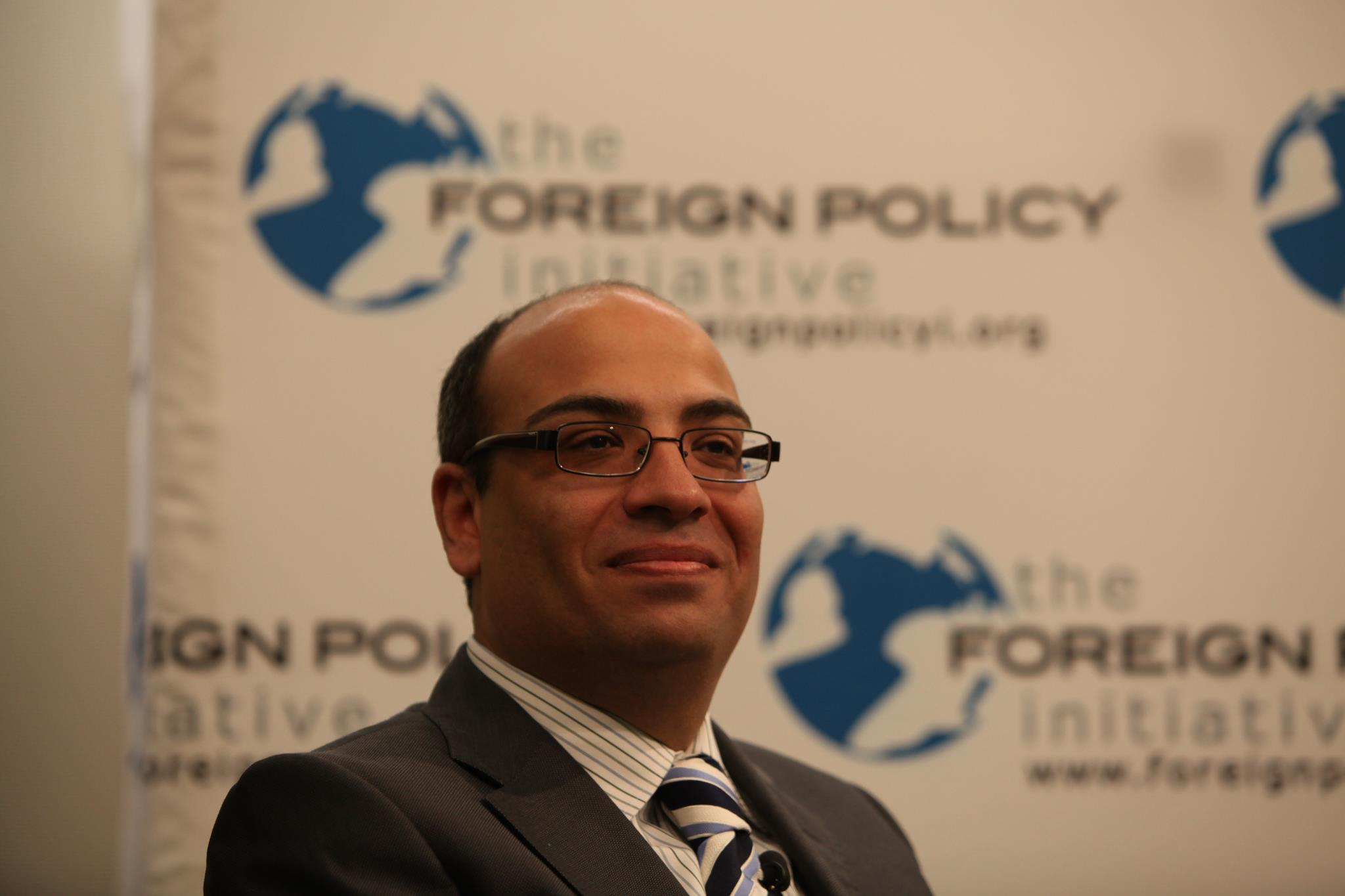
- Mehdi Khalaji in 2009
- Born: 21 September 1973 (age 52); Qom, Iran
- Citizenship: United States
- Education: Qom Seminary
- Occupations: Writer; translator; journalist; scholar; cleric (formerly)
- Organization: Washington Institute for Near East Policy
- Political party: Democratic Party
- Spouses: Mahmonir Rahimi (divorced) Mehrnoush Pourziae (divorced) Marjan Sheikholeslami (divorced)
- Father: Mohammad-Taghi Khalaji

Mehdi Khalaji (Persian: مهدی خلجی, born September 21, 1973) is an Iranian-American writer, scholar of Islamic studies, political analyst, and a former Shia cleric. He has been researching at The Washington Institute for Near East Policy since 2005, and is now a senior research fellow focusing on the politics of Iran and Shiite groups in the Middle East. He has frequently contributed to media outlets such as The Guardian, BBC, The Washington Post, and The New York Times.

== Education and career ==
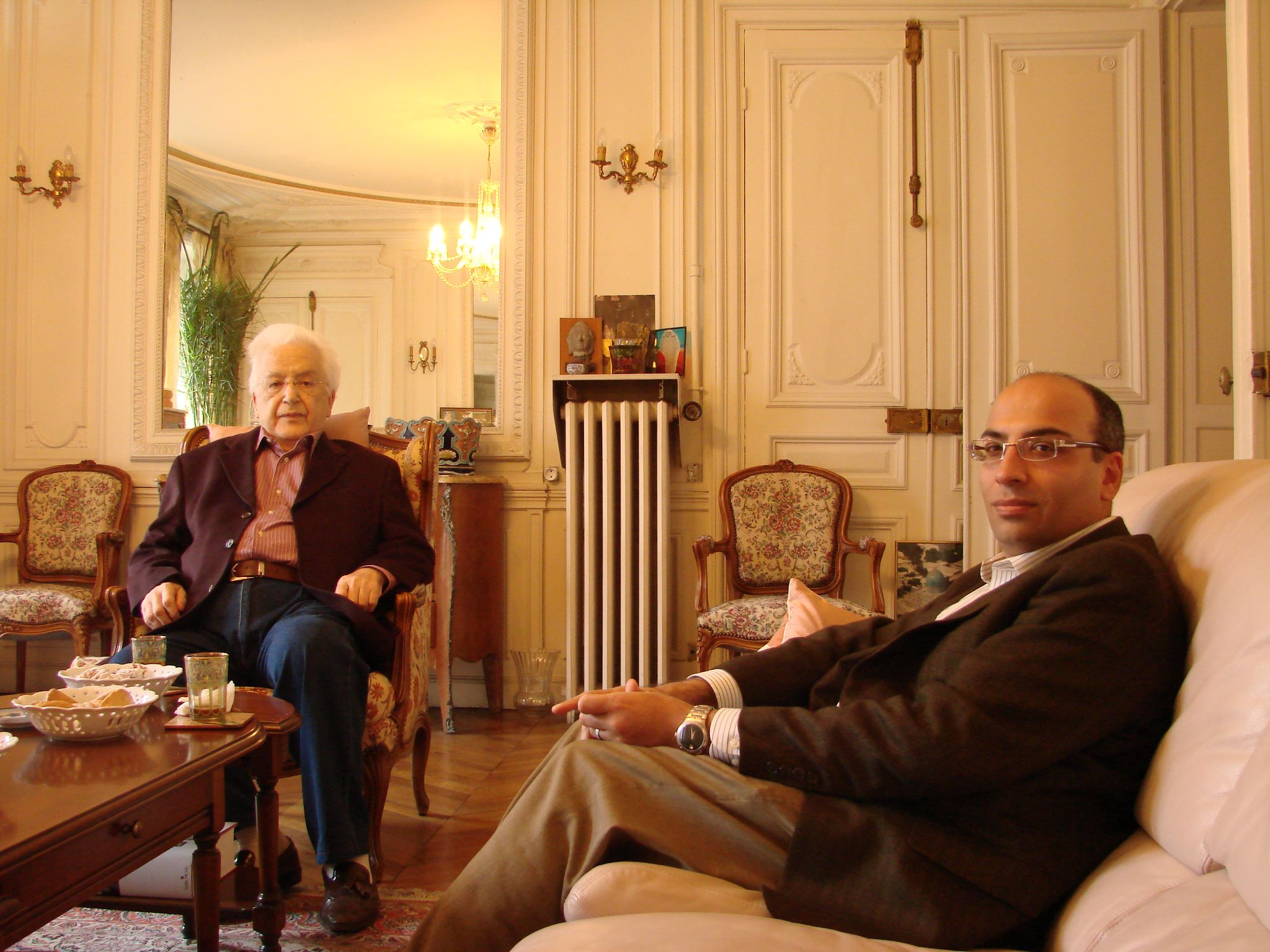
Khalaji with Mohammed Arkoun, Paris, 2008

A native from Qom, the center for Shi'a scholarship in Iran, Khalaji studied Islamic theology in Qom Seminary, and Philosophy in Tarbiat Modarres University.

From 1986 to 2000, Khalaji trained in the seminaries of Qom, the traditional center of Iran's clerical establishment. There he studied theology and jurisprudence, earning a doctorate and thoroughly researched on modern intellectual and philosophical-political developments in Iran and the wider Islamic and Western worlds. In Qom, and later in Tehran, Khalaji launched a career in journalism, first serving on the editorial board of a theological journal, Naqd va Nazar, and then the daily Entekhab. In addition to his own writing, he has translated the works of the Islamic humanist scholar Muhammad Arkoun and other modernist Muslim intellectuals.

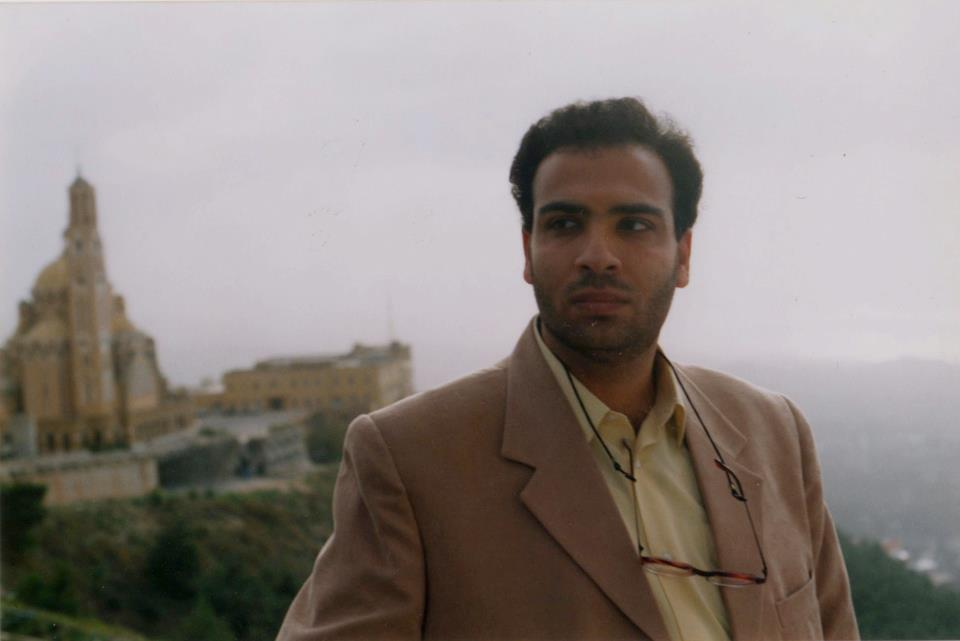
Khalaji in 1998

In 2000, Khalaji moved to Paris where he studied Shiite theology and exegesis in the Ecole Pratique des Hautes Etudes, but didn't earn any degree or certificate. He also worked for BBC Persian as a political analyst on Iranian affairs, eventually becoming a broadcaster for the Prague-based Radio Farda, the Persian-language service of the U.S. government's Radio Free Europe/Radio Liberty. At Radio Farda, he produced news, features, and analysis on a range of Middle Eastern, Iranian, and Islamic issues.

In 2005, Mehdi Khalaji became a senior fellow at The Washington Institute, focusing on the politics of Iran and Shiite groups in the Middle East. A Shiite theologian by training, Khalaji has also served on the editorial boards of two prominent Iranian periodicals and produced for the BBC as well as the U.S. government's Persian news service. He is a frequent contributor in PolicyWatch and PeaceWatch segments submitted by the Washington Institute for Near East Policy. He has participated in many panels including one in November 2006 when he appeared on a panel run by American Foreign Policy Council, titled "Understanding the Iranian Threat", along with James Woolsey, Ilan Berman, and Patrick Clawson. He is a writer and contributor for numerous English-language and Persian-language media entities. He also teaches Persian-language webinars on Quran'ic interpretation for Tavaana: E-Learning Institute for Iranian Civil Society. Khalaji left The Washington Institute in December 2023.

=== Father's arrest ===
On January 12, 2010, Mehdi Khalaji’s father, Mohammad Taghi Khalaji, was arrested in Iran. A report from The Washington Institute for Near East Policy stated that agents of Iran's Ministry of Intelligence, conducted a violent house search, confiscating personal files, books, letters, a computer, satellite receiver and the family's passports. Mehdi Khalaji's daughter's passport was among those confiscated. Khalaji's family was banned from leaving Iran.

== Views ==
Khalaji is a democrat. He is against the Iran deal.

Mehdi Khalaji, has expressed concerns similar to those of the Islamic Republic's reformists, particularly regarding the lack of political freedoms and the repression of dissent. Khalaji acknowledges their efforts to create political space. In his article, "The Vanishing Islam in the Islamic Republic's Election," he discusses the limited opportunities for reform within the Islamic Republic's political system and recognizes the impact of reformist efforts in bringing attention to the need for change.

Mehdi Khalaji, critiquing the Pahlavi monarchy often argues that the Shah's secular policies were one of the primary reasons for the Islamic Revolution. This point of view is very similar to Mohammad Javad Zarif. Both have argued for a non-secular political system and the role of religion in Iranian politics, though their conclusions differ.

== Controversies ==
Alleged Financial Misconduct

In March 2019 Khalaji and his wife, Marjan Sheikholeslami Aleagha, were listed among the main suspects in the largest financial corruption case in Iranian history with a total amount of 6.7 billion euros. Khalaji and his wife are suspected that they made contracts with Islamic Revolutionary Guard Corps oil and gas company, Sepanir, and in order to bypass sanctions they used personal accounts which were used to embezzle money to United States and Canada.

== Publications ==
Booklets

- Apocalyptic Politics: On the Rationality of Iranian Politics
- Through the Veil: The Role of Broadcasting in U.S. Public Diplomacy toward Iranians
- The Last Marja: Sistani and the End of Traditional Religious Authority in Shiism

Books

- Natani (novel in Persian, published in Berlin by Nashr-e Gardoon)
- The New Order of the Clerical Establishment in Iran: Nazm-e Novin-e Rohaniat Dar Iran (Persian Edition)
