= Simin Keramati =

Iranian-born Canadian artist and filmmaker (b. 1970)

- سیمین کرامتی
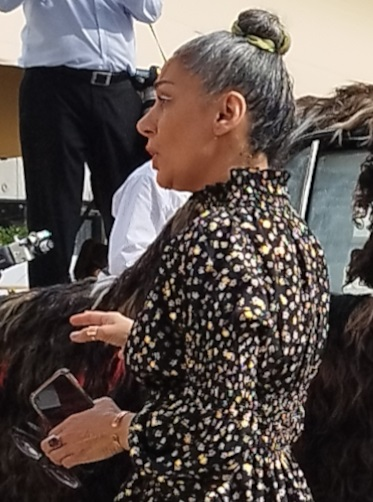
- Keramati in 2023
- Born: 1970 (age 55–56); Tehran,
- Other name: Simīn Kirāmatī
- Education: Islamic Azad University, Tehran University of Art, George Brown College
- Occupation: Multidisciplinary visual artist
- Known for: Painter, video artist, installation artist, filmmaker
- Website: Official website

Simin Keramati (Persian: سیمین کرامتی; born 1970) is an Iranian-born Canadian multidisciplinary visual artist and activist. She is primarily known as a painter, video artist, installation artist, and filmmaker. Keramati lives in Toronto.

== Biography ==
Simin Keramati was born in 1970 in Tehran. She attended Tehran University of Art, where she received both B.A and M.A. degree (1996) in painting, and the Islamic Azad University, where she received a B.A. degree (1995) in English; She moved to Toronto in 2012–13, and attended George Brown College for post graduate studies.

Keramati's art work focuses on socio-political topics, identity, and the injustices facing women in Iran. Some of her art contemporaries include Shirin Neshat, Shadi Ghadirian, and Newsha Tavakolian.

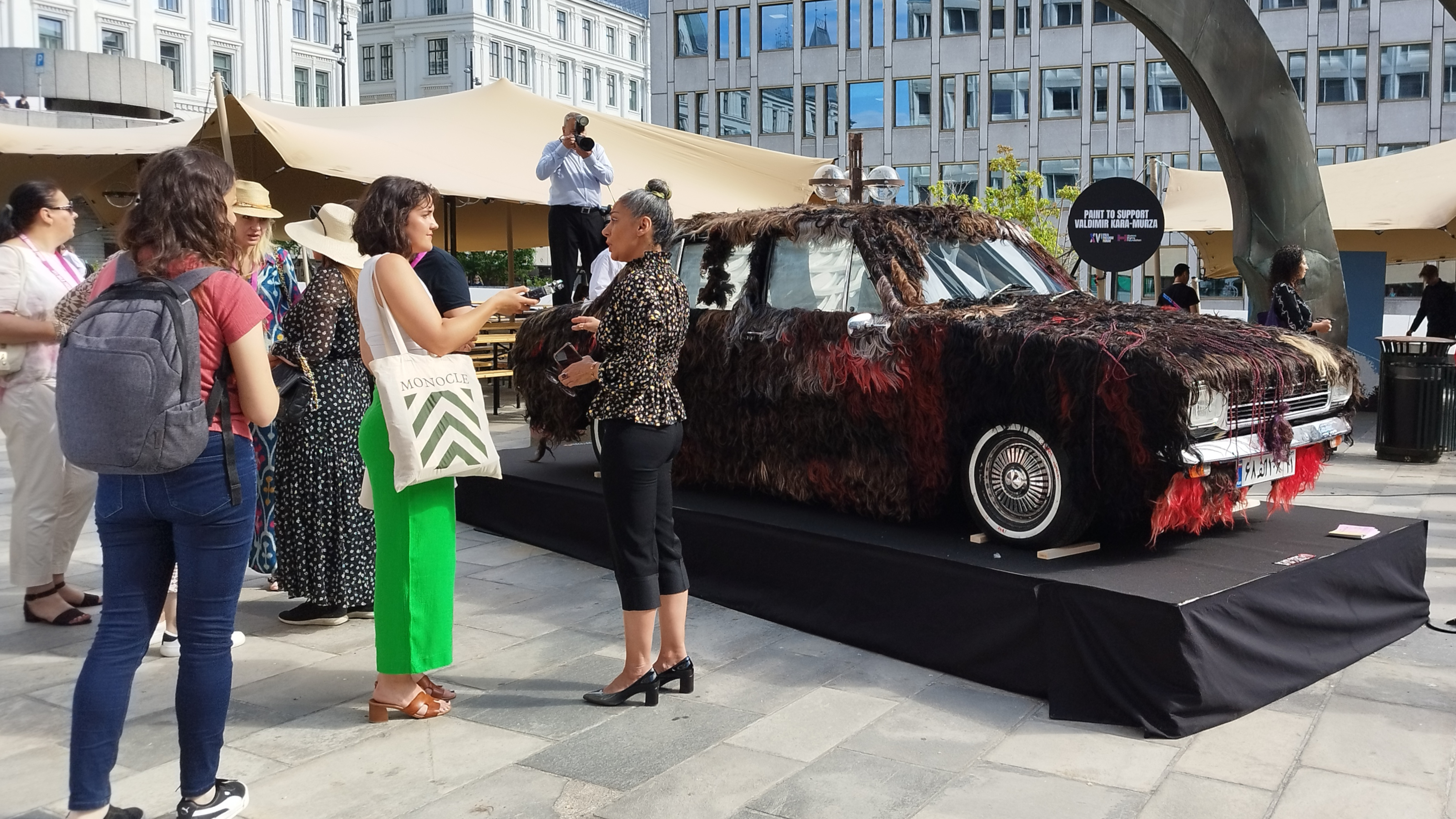
Keramati being interviewed at the PaykanArtCar unveiling in Oslo, 2023

In 2009, Keramati was part of the group exhibition, Made in Iran, curated by Arianne Levene and Eglantine de Ganay and held at the Asia House, London; other artists in the show included Nazgol Ansarinia, Shirin Aliabadi, Behrouz Rae, Vahid Sharifian, Peyman Hooshmandzadeh, and Arash Hanaei. Her work was part of the group exhibition, Art Brief IV: Iranian Contemporary San Francisco (2018) held at SOMA Arts in San Francisco, created in conjunction with the nonprofit group Moms Against Poverty (MAP).

In September 2022, during the Mahsa Amini protests she helped organize the protest event outside of the Legislative Assembly of Ontario, and Keramati also created a notable protest poster.

In 2023, the Aga Khan Museum commissioned Keramati to create the interactive installation entitled “The Elephant in the Dark” for its Rumi exhibition.

She created the second installment of the PaykanArtCar, unveiled in June 2023.

Keramati received the Grand Prize at the Dhaka International Biennial in 2003–04 and was shortlisted for the Magic of Persia Contemporary Art Prize in 2009.

== See also ==
- List of Iranian women artists
